= 2026 United States F-15E rescue operation in Iran =

Combat search and rescue operation during the 2026 Iran War

- Part of the 2026 Iran war
- US forces locating and rescuing one of the pilots of the downed F-15E
- Type: Combat search and rescue
- Locations: Kohgiluyeh and Boyer-Ahmad province, Iran; 30.7°N 51.6°E (approximate F-15E wreckage site); Near Mahyar, Isfahan province 32.2213°N 51.9014°E (U.S. forward operating base)
- Date: 3–5 April 2026 (2 days)
- Executed by: Department of Defense; United States Air Force; 427th Special Operations Squadron; Pararescuemen; United States Army; 1st SFOD-D; 160th SOAR; United States Navy; DEVGRU; Central Intelligence Agency
- Outcome: Both crew members rescued
- Casualties: United States: 2 crew from F-15E injured (Note: The pilot was reported to be seriously injured while the WSO suffered minor injuries.); Some crew aboard UH-60 helicopters injured; Iran: 9 IRGC troops killed; 8 wounded
- Losses: United States: Claimed as self-destroyed: 2 MC-130J Hercules; 4 MH-6 or AH-6 special operations helicopters; Destroyed by Iran: 1 A-10 Thunderbolt II; 1 Hermes 900 (per Iran); 1 MQ-9 Reaper (per Iran); Damaged by Iran: 2 UH-60 Black Hawks (Note: The helicopters may have been HH-60 Pave Hawk variants)
- Locations of F-15E wreckage and U.S forward operating base

In early April 2026, a combat search and rescue operation was conducted by the United States Department of Defense to recover two crew members of a McDonnell Douglas F-15E Strike Eagle of the 494th Fighter Squadron. The aircraft had been shot down over Iran by Iranian forces on 3 April 2026, during the 2026 Iran war.

The pilot was rescued by U.S. forces seven hours after the crash. The operation involved hundreds of U.S. troops and dozens of aircraft. The weapon systems officer (WSO) escaped in the area of the Zagros Mountains, while the Iranian Revolutionary Guard Corps (IRGC), U.S. combat search and rescue personnel, and the local nomadic tribesmen worked to find him. The WSO was recovered by U.S. forces supported by 155 aircraft. A U.S. military official described it as "one of the most challenging and complex [missions] in the history of U.S. special operations."

Iran claimed multiple aircraft shootdowns during the rescue operation. The U.S. claimed there had been a shootdown of one of its A-10 Thunderbolt II attack aircraft, and the intentional destruction of two of its Lockheed MC-130 transport aircraft and four helicopters to avoid capture. Iran later claimed the "operation may have been a deceptive plan to steal enriched uranium" of Iran's nuclear program, and compared the operation to the failed 1980 Operation Eagle Claw, the last publicly acknowledged U.S. military ground operation in Iran.

== Background ==
F-15E shootdown
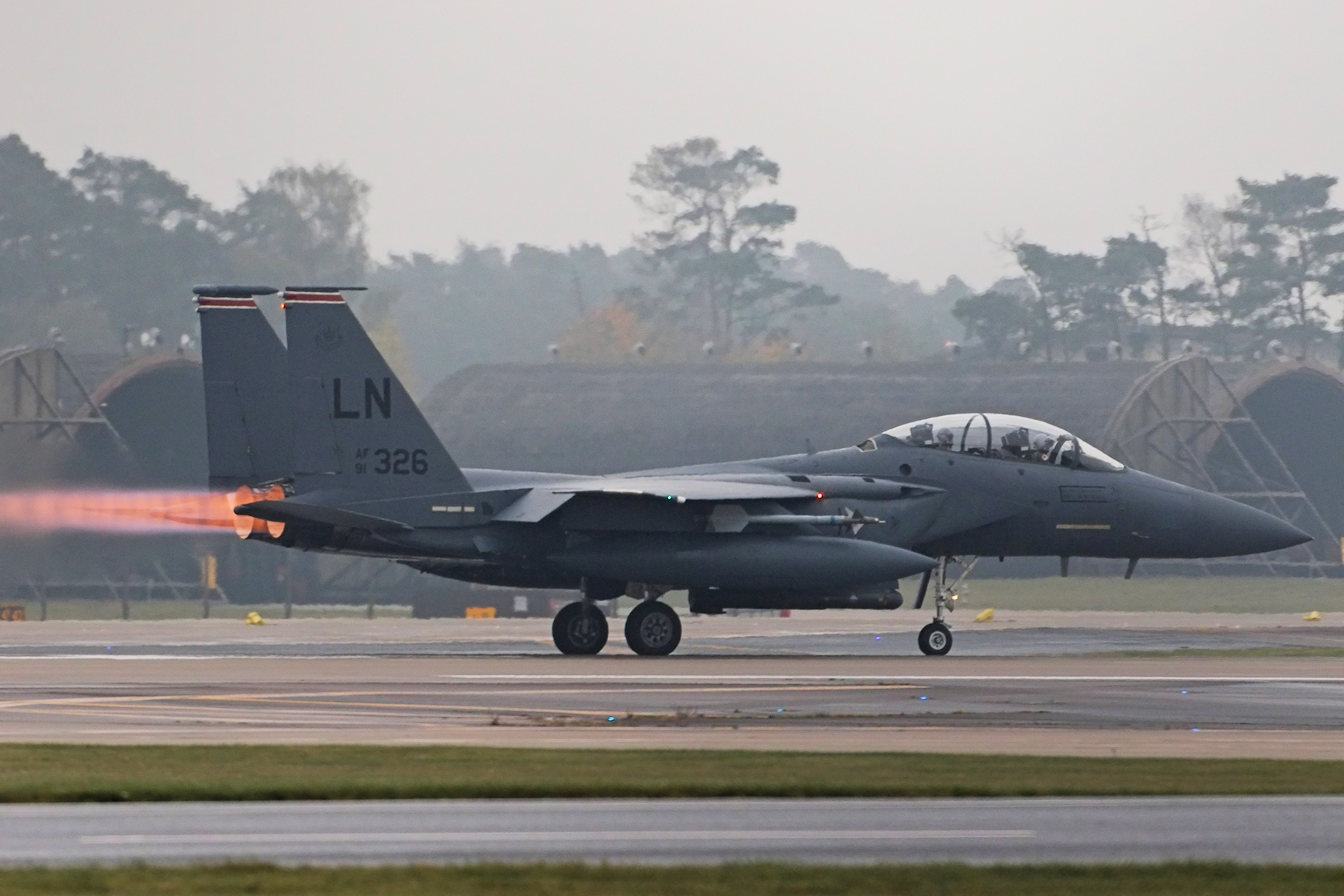
- An F-15E Strike Eagle of the 494th Fighter Squadron, similar to the aircraft shot down

Shootdown
- Date: 3 April 2026
- Summary: Shot down by Iranian forces
- Site: Near Yasuj, Kohgiluyeh and Boyer-Ahmad; 30.7°N 51.6°E

Aircraft
- Aircraft type: McDonnell Douglas F-15E Strike Eagle
- Operator: United States Air Force
- Call sign: Dude 44
- Crew: 2
- Fatalities: 0
- Injuries: 2
- Survivors: 2

On 28 February 2026, the United States and Israel started a series of surprise attacks on a variety of military and industrial targets across Iran, thus starting the war with Iran. On 24 March, U.S. President Donald Trump claimed that Iran was unable to "do a thing" about U.S. aircraft operating in its airspace.

On 3 April, an American F-15E Strike Eagle (call sign Dude 44) was shot down by Iran with a shoulder-fired missile. The two crew members ejected and landed in Iranian territory.

== Rescue operation ==
An F-15E Strike Eagle has a crew of a pilot and a weapon systems officer (WSO). The U.S. military launched an immediate rescue operation to extract the two crewmen from Iranian territory, using special operations forces and air support assets. The pilot was successfully rescued by U.S. forces hours after the crash, but the WSO, who held the rank of colonel, was still missing. Iranian and U.S. forces engaged in a race to find the second crew member. U.S. surveillance drones failed to find the airman, and he was "status unknown".

Trump's national security team spent much of the day in the West Wing. According to a report from the Wall Street Journal, Trump panicked at this point, "shouting at aides for hours", such that military officials barred him from the Situation Room throughout the operation, only briefing him at key moments of the mission over phone. Publicly, the President played down the incident, but privately, it was likely considered "a serious concern", as the capture of the airman would have been a "political embarrassment" for the U.S. government.

After ejecting from the aircraft and landing, the airman experienced a light concussion and was unconscious. After regaining consciousness, he hiked a 7,000-foot (2,100 m) ridgeline in the Zagros Mountains foothills and hid in a mountain crevice and restricted the use of his emergency beacon signal so that it would not be picked up by Iran.

While tracking the airman, the Central Intelligence Agency (CIA) launched a disinformation campaign in Iran claiming that the airman was already rescued. The CIA shared the beacon signal's location with the Pentagon, which had to confirm that the beacon was not an Iranian trap. The airman sent a short radio message, saying "God is good". The CIA then reportedly used a special technology to locate the airman. (Note: According to the New York Post, the technology was called "Ghost Murmur," which is described as an experimental system designed to detect the extremely faint electromagnetic signals produced by a human heartbeat. It combines highly sensitive quantum sensors with AI-based filtering to separate a person's biological signal from environmental noise and use it to help estimate their location. However, this description was widely viewed with skepticism at the time of reporting, as no publicly verified evidence exists for long-range detection of human heartbeat signals, and scientists argue such capabilities would exceed known physical and technological limits.) The CIA also used the so-called "unconventional assisted recovery" process by contacting civilians willing to assist U.S. military forces. Airstrikes were used to keep Iranian forces away from that area. The U.S. used an abandoned agricultural airstrip (200 ft by 3900 ft) 14 mi (23 km) north of Shahreza city in southern Isfahan as a temporary forward operating base, which was operated and protected by operators from Delta Force, while Iran offered a reward of approximately US$60,000 for information leading to the airman.

The U.S. forces, which included Air Force special tactics teams and Navy special warfare operators from DEVGRU (also known as "SEAL Team Six"), raced not only against IRGC forces, but also local Bakhtiari nomadic tribesmen who are traditionally armed with hunting rifles and familiar with the Zagros Mountains terrain. During the operation U.S. aircraft and drones provided fire support. Two helicopters were hit by small-arms fire originating from the tribesmen, but remained operational. Some of the helicopter crew were wounded.

Iran claimed it disrupted the rescue operation and shot down many U.S. aircraft. The U.S. later announced the operation as a success, stating two stuck MC-130 special operations transport planes were deliberately destroyed at the abandoned airstrip after replacement aircraft arrived and flew out the rescued WSO and about a hundred personnel. Iran then revised its previous statement, claiming it destroyed one aircraft. According to a U.S. military official cited by The Daily Telegraph, the replacement aircraft were three Air Force Special Operations Command De Havilland Canada Dash 8, though FlightGlobal believed Airbus C295Ws seen flying in the area likely undertook this mission; this was corroborated by CBS. Reuters reported that the about 100 special ‌operations forces at the forward operating base did not have an immediate extraction option for about two hours.

During daylight while closing in on the WSO, U.S. commandos fired weapons to keep Iranian forces away from the rescue site, but did not engage in a firefight. U.S. attack aircraft also dropped bombs on approaching Iranian convoys to keep them away from the area, and engaged in electronic jamming. Iran reported shooting down a drone over Isfahan.

On 5 April, the WSO was successfully rescued alive with minor injuries. The U.S. and multiple reports stated that no American servicemen were killed during the operation.

According to Israeli officials, Israeli intelligence and tactical support played a role in searching for the missing pilots, while the Israel Defense Forces (IDF) targeted Iranian assets to sabotage and disrupt Iranian attempts to find the WSO.

US President Donald Trump later stated that the rescue mission had involved 155 US aircraft, including four bombers, 64 fighters, 48 refueling tankers, 13 rescue aircraft along with other aircraft.

== Iranian reports on the operation ==
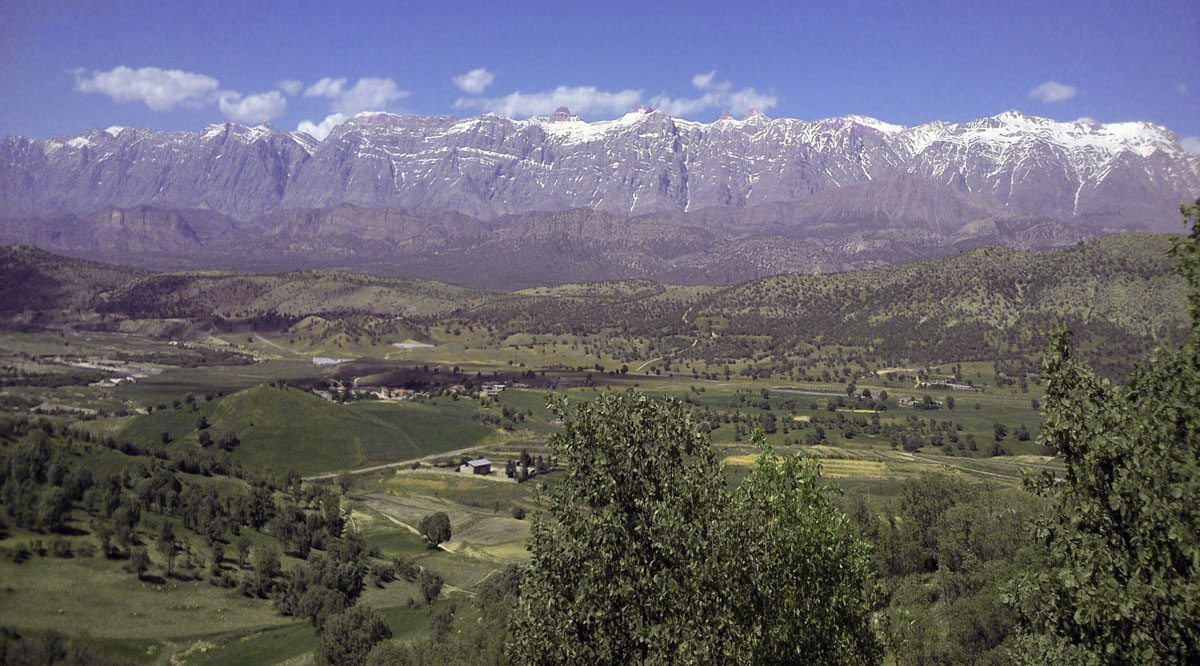
The Dena range of mountains, a sub-range of the Zagros Mountains, separating Kohgiluyeh and Boyer-Ahmad province from Isfahan province, forming part of the search area

In the evening of 3 April, an IRGC linked social media account posted a photo of an ejector seat in desert landscape which was asserted to be from the F-15E, and later photos of parts of an F-15E were posted identifying it as from 494th Fighter Squadron based at RAF Lakenheath in the United Kingdom. An Iranian news agency reported that at about 2 am local time on 5 April, drones and helicopters were heard in parts of Kohgiluyeh and Boyer-Ahmad province, presumed to be a U.S. search operation, and at about 5 am multiple explosions were heard. Iranian military subsequently claimed two drones had been shot down, a MQ-9 Reaper and a Hermes 900.

A France 24 correspondent in Iran reported that about an hour before President Trump announced that the second airman had been recovered, Iranian social media posts reported that explosions and aircraft were heard near the city of Yasuj at 3 am local time, 5 April, near where the F-15 had come down.

Alaeddin Boroujerdi, former chairman of the Iranian National Security Commission, said the U.S. forward operating base was at an abandoned airfield near Mahyar, Isfahan, (32.2213°N 51.9014°E) about 20 kilometres (12 mi) north of Shahreza and about 50 kilometres (31 mi) south of Isfahan, with air cover provided by F-15, F-16, and F-35 aircraft and about 20 drones. He said the U.S. forces evacuated after coming under fire, and two of their C-130 aircraft were disabled. Boroujerdi said the scale of the deployment suggested their main objective was to locate and take enriched uranium out of Iran, rather than a limited rescue mission.

According to Brig. Gen. Mohammad Akrami-Nia, the Speaker for the Iranian Army, one of the MC-130J Hercules had been shot by 2nd Brig. Gen. Massoud Zare using a MANPADS (which was later reported to be Misagh-3). The operator was killed during preparation for a second shot. However, no evidence has been put forth to support this claim, and the BBC noted that the alleged missile identification could not be independently verified. According to the U.S., the two MC-130s were grounded due to technical malfunctions, and subsequently intentionally destroyed by friendly airstrike to prevent from falling into Iranian hands.

== Reactions ==
=== Iran ===
Iranian officials celebrated the shooting down of the F-15E and later the A-10 during the rescue mission, claiming it as a success. Khatam al-Anbiya spokesman Ebrahim Zolfaghari stated that "the so-called US military rescue operation, planned as a deception and escape mission at an abandoned airport in southern Isfahan under the pretext of recovering the pilot of a downed aircraft, was completely foiled." The Iranian military compared the rescue operation to Operation Eagle Claw—a rescue operation in 1980 in Iran that resulted in the destruction of US aircraft.

On 6 April, Iran's foreign ministry spokesperson Esmail Baghaei stated "The possibility that this was a deception operation to steal enriched uranium should not be ignored at all", referring to the nuclear program of Iran, and arguing the claimed location of the pilot in Kohgiluyeh and Boyer-Ahmad was "a long way" from the locations of attempted US landings.

=== Israel ===
Prime Minister Benjamin Netanyahu hailed the rescue of the missing U.S. airmen, stating that "This rescue operation reinforces the sacred principle: no one is left behind." He further noted that "This is a shared value demonstrated time and time again in the history of both our countries [...] As a nation that repeatedly carried out daring rescue operations, and as someone who was wounded in such a mission and lost a brother in the Entebbe rescue, Israelis and I, we know what a bold decision you took."

=== United States ===
President Donald Trump praised the successful rescue operation, posting "WE GOT HIM!" on Truth Social after the second crew member was rescued and describing it as the "most daring operation in US history". The White House and Pentagon both praised the bravery and skills of all military personnel involved in the operation. The BBC noted that the success of the rescue turned a "potential propaganda problem" into a "cause for celebration" for the Trump administration.

== Casualties and losses ==
=== Iran ===
According to Iranian sources, three soldiers from the Islamic Revolutionary Guards were killed. The Iranian Army announced that four of its officers, including Brigadier General Masoud Zare, were killed by a U.S. airstrike in Mahyar, Isfahan, after hitting an aircraft with a shoulder-fired missile during the rescue operation. Zare was the commander of the Iranian Army Air Defense College.

=== United States ===
- 2 UH-60 Black Hawks were hit and damaged. An undisclosed number of crew aboard the helicopters were injured.
- 1 A-10 Thunderbolt II shot down.
- 2 MC-130J Hercules intentionally destroyed by U.S. forces after they became stuck to avoid falling into enemy hands.
- 4 MH-6 or AH-6 special operations helicopters destroyed from the 160th Special Operations Aviation Regiment (Airborne). A U.S. official claimed that these too were intentionally destroyed.

The U.S. reported that no service members were killed during the operation.

The Iranian military and Revolutionary Guard declared in distinct statements that an Israeli Hermes-900 drone and an American MQ-9 drone were downed in Isfahan province as part of this operation.

== Analysis ==
Some U.S. analysts considered the downing of the F-15E in Iran, followed by the destruction of several rescue aircraft, as revealing the limitations of U.S. air superiority. Former CENTCOM commander Kenneth F. McKenzie Jr. considered the destroyed aircraft as acceptable losses in order to accomplish the mission. The cost of the destroyed US aircraft during the rescue mission is estimated as US$300 million.

An NBC News article commented on the use of a MANPADS (shoulder-fired missile), stating that despite the U.S. effort to neutralize the conventional military capabilities of Iran, the threat of asymmetric warfare endured.

A military analyst argued that the rescue operation highlighted the escalating strategic and political costs of combat search and rescue in contested airspace, noting that the commitment of 155 aircraft and the loss of multiple platforms demonstrated that personnel recovery had shifted from a tactical obligation to a strategic imperative directly tied to national reputation and domestic political pressure.

In June 2026, two sources told CNN that the pilot of the downed F-15E Strike Eagle reported seeing a "jellyfish-like" formation of Iranian drones before the aircraft was shot down. According to The Aviationist, if accurate this could describe an implementation of "one-to-many meshed networking", a drone technology previously unknown to be possessed by Iran; but notes that the claims are unverified and uncorroborated by any evidence beyond the pilots' accounts, and that the alleged drones are not linked to the F-15E's downing.

According to an unnamed American military expert, Iran probably located the fighter jet using several drones and shot it down using a MANPADS of probably Chinese origin.

== See also ==
- Scott O'Grady
- Rescue of Bat 21 Bravo
- List of aviation shootdowns and accidents during the 2026 Iran war
