= Sohray =

Sohray (Persian: صحرائ) may refer to various places in Iran:

- Sohray Amiriyeh
- Sohray Cheghad
- Sohray Ghazanfariyeh-ye Jonubi
- Sohray Kallah Qazi
- Sohray Zareheh

== See also ==
- Sahray (disambiguation), various places in Iran
- Sohra, Iran (disambiguation)
