= Maran, Isfahan =

Maran ماران
- Village
- Location within Iran
- Coordinates: 31°53′25″N 51°55′09″E
- Country: Iran
- Province: Isfahan
- County: Shahreza
- Bakhsh: Central
- Rural District: Manzariyeh

Population (2006)
  - Total: 50
- Time zone: UTC+3:30 (IRST)
  - Summer (DST): UTC+4:30 (IRDT)

Maran (Persian: ماران, also Romanized as Mārān; also known as Mara, Mareh, Mazra‘eh Mārūn, Mīrābād, and Morādābād) is a village in Manzariyeh Rural District, in the Central District of Shahreza County, Isfahan Province, Iran. At the 2006 census, its population was 50, in 19 families.
