= Jarm Afshar =

Neighborhood in Isfahan province, Iran

Jarm Afshar Persian: جرم افشار
- Neighborhood
- Location within Iran
- Coordinates: 32°03′22″N 51°54′34″E
- Country: Iran
- Province: Isfahan
- County: Shahreza
- District: Central
- City: Shahreza

Population (2006)
  - Total: 1,687
- Time zone: UTC+3:30 (IRST)

Jarm Afshar (Persian: جرم افشار) (Note: Also romanized as Jarm Afshār; also known as Garmafshār) is a neighborhood in the city of Shahreza in the Central District of Shahreza County, (Note: Formerly Qomsheh County) Isfahan province, Iran.

== Demographics ==
=== Population ===
At the time of the 2006 National Census, Jarm Afshar's population was 1,687 in 437 households, when it was a village in Dasht Rural District. After the census, Jarm Afshar was annexed by the city of Shahreza.
