= Valandan =

Village in Isfahan province, Iran

Valandan Persian: ولندان
- Village
- Location within Iran
- Coordinates: 31°54′34″N 51°54′29″E
- Country: Iran
- Province: Isfahan
- County: Shahreza
- District: Central
- Rural District: Manzariyeh

Population (2016)
  - Total: 232
- Time zone: UTC+3:30 (IRST)

Valandan (Persian: ولندان) (Note: Also romanized as Valandān; also known as Valandūn) is a village in Manzariyeh Rural District of the Central District in Shahreza County, (Note: Formerly Qomsheh County) Isfahan province, Iran.

The main families living in this village are The Mardānies, The Hemmaties and The Atāees. Many former residents have immigrated to other cities such as Isfahan, Abadan, Tehran. One of the greatest Valandanians is Dr. Parviz Moin, professor of Mechanical Engineering at Stanford University.

== Demographics ==
=== Population ===
At the time of the 2006 National Census, the village's population was 276 in 83 households. The following census in 2011 counted 242 people in 75 households. The 2016 census measured the population of the village as 232 people in 76 households.
