= Emamzadeh Aliakbar, Isfahan =

Village in Isfahan province, Iran

Emamzadeh Aliakbar Persian: امامزاده علي اكبر
- Village
- Location within Iran
- Coordinates: 32°07′50″N 51°55′13″E
- Country: Iran
- Province: Isfahan
- County: Shahreza
- District: Central
- Rural District: Dasht

Population (2016)
  - Total: 738
- Time zone: UTC+3:30 (IRST)

Emamzadeh Aliakbar (Persian: امامزاده علي اكبر) (Note: Also romanized as Emāmzādeh ʿAlīākbar) is a village in Dasht Rural District of the Central District in Shahreza County, (Note: Formerly Qomsheh County) Isfahan province, Iran.

== Demographics ==
=== Population ===
At the time of the 2006 National Census, the village's population was 655 in 208 households. The following census in 2011 counted 695 people in 229 households. The 2016 census measured the population of the village as 738 people in 256 households.
