= Hunejan =

Village in Isfahan province, Iran

Hunejan Persian: هونجان
- Village
- Location within Iran
- Coordinates: 31°36′33″N 51°52′04″E
- Country: Iran
- Province: Isfahan
- County: Shahreza
- District: Central
- Rural District: Esfarjan

Population (2016)
  - Total: 2,432
- Time zone: UTC+3:30 (IRST)

Hunejan (Persian: هونجان) (Note: Also romanized as Hūnejān and Hunjān; also known as Hinijān) is a village in Esfarjan Rural District of the Central District in Shahreza County, (Note: Formerly Qomsheh County) Isfahan province, Iran.

== Demographics ==
=== Population ===
At the time of the 2006 National Census, the village's population was 2,794 in 770 households. The following census in 2011 counted 2,624 people in 794 households. The 2016 census measured the population of the village as 2,432 people in 815 households, the most populous in its rural district.

== See also ==
Hunjan, a surname among the diaspora from the village
