= Aminabad, Shahreza =

Village in Isfahan province, Iran

Aminabad Persian: امين اباد
- Village
- Location within Iran
- Coordinates: 31°40′31″N 52°03′55″E
- Country: Iran
- Province: Isfahan
- County: Shahreza
- District: Central
- Rural District: Esfarjan

Population (2016)
  - Total: 983
- Time zone: UTC+3:30 (IRST)

Aminabad (Persian: امين اباد) (Note: Also romanized as Amīnābād) is a village in Esfarjan Rural District of the Central District in Shahreza County, (Note: Formerly Qomsheh County) Isfahan province, Iran.

Aminabad lies south of Shahreza, near the border of Fars province along the main highway No. 7 connecting Isfahan to Shiraz.

With a population of around 1500 and increasing number of Ghashghai tribal people leaving nomadic life and settling there permanently, Amin Abad is a growing area and will soon be officially given the status of a city. Grape, wheat, stone fruits and sheep farming are among main industries in Amin Abad.

== History ==
Amin Abad has a long history of human settlement, with old mud brick citadel of estimated age of more than 500 years. This amazing historical monument was unfortunately demolished with minimal or no official assessment by Iran Cultural Heritage Conservation Organization. Amin Abad caravanserai is a Safavid dynasty era structure and a major tourist attraction. Although no official study has been done, but according to elders, it seems that a mix of Bakhtiari Lors, Ghashghaie Turks, and Hassani Arabs but have gathered to form Amin Abad which is actually not true, for example Gashgaie Turks moved to (already existing) Amin Abad about only 50 years ago. But the real natives were Iranian. There are a number of clans now dominating the demographics of Amin Abad like Haj Abassgholi, Haj Mohammad Karim, Haj Mohammad Rahim, and Hamezei. These clans have family names like Hajimirzaalian, Aliani, Alian, Izadi, Hamzei and Mohammadkhani. The first clan though, the founder of Amin Abad was the family Yousefi.

Since 1999, Village councils has been established to run the administration of the village. Council elections are held every 4 years. Prior to this period issues used to be dealt with through an unofficial elder (Kadkhoda) or through relevant organization in Shahreza. Late Haj Mehdi Alian was the last Kadkhoda.

During political turmoils and lack of security in the final years of Qajar dynasty that led to establishment of Pahlavi dynasty, Kadkhodas were the only point of authority in the face of increasing lawlessness. There are stories about Mashadi Mirza Alian, an elder from Haj Mohammad Rahim clan, who was the Kadkhoda of the time, ruled with occasional harsh penalties for robberies and adultery. On the other hands there are tales of generosity and helping of poor during the famine of those years.

Medical records show the existence of Alpha-Thalassemia, as a genetic disorder in different families of Aminabad.

== Demographics ==
=== Population ===
At the time of the 2006 National Census, the village's population was 1,197 in 305 households. The following census in 2011 counted 1,137 people in 300 households. The 2016 census measured the population of the village as 983 people in 309 households.
