= Manuchehrabad =

Manuchehrabad (Persian: منوچهراباد) may refer to:

- Manuchehrabad, Shahreza, Isfahan Province
- Manuchehrabad, Kermanshah
