= Ziaratgah, Shahreza =

Village in Isfahan province, Iran

Ziaratgah Persian: زيارتگاه
- Village
- Location within Iran
- Coordinates: 31°55′02″N 51°54′13″E
- Country: Iran
- Province: Isfahan
- County: Shahreza
- District: Central
- Rural District: Manzariyeh

Population (2016)
  - Total: 291
- Time zone: UTC+3:30 (IRST)

Ziaratgah (Persian: زيارتگاه) (Note: Also romanized as Zīāratgāh) is a village in Manzariyeh Rural District of the Central District in Shahreza County, (Note: Formerly Qomsheh County) Isfahan province, Iran.

== Demographics ==
=== Population ===
At the time of the 2006 National Census, the village's population was 396 in 111 households. The following census in 2011 counted 342 people in 113 households. The 2016 census measured the population of the village as 291 people in 97 households.
