= Esfeh =

Village in Isfahan province, Iran

Esfeh Persian: اسفه
- Village
- Location within Iran
- Coordinates: 32°06′13″N 51°54′22″E
- Country: Iran
- Province: Isfahan
- County: Shahreza
- District: Central
- Rural District: Dasht

Population (2016)
  - Total: 202
- Time zone: UTC+3:30 (IRST)

Esfeh (Persian: اسفه) (Note: Also romanized as Isfeh; also known as Esfe and Ispeh) is a village in Dasht Rural District of the Central District in Shahreza County, (Note: Formerly Qomsheh County) Isfahan province, Iran.

== Demographics ==
=== Population ===
At the time of the 2006 National Census, the village's population was 269 in 80 households. The following census in 2011 counted 268 people in 78 households. The 2016 census measured the population of the village as 202 people in 74 households.
