= Khuru =

Khuru may refer to:

- Khuru (sport), a traditional Bhutanese sport
- Khuru, Bhutan, a town in Bhutan
- Khuru, Fars, a village in Iran
- Khuru, Isfahan, a village in Iran
