= Manuchehrabad, Shahreza =

Neighborhood in Isfahan province, Iran

Manuchehrabad Persian: منوچهراباد
- Neighborhood
- Location within Iran
- Coordinates: 32°02′48″N 51°54′10″E
- Country: Iran
- Province: Isfahan
- County: Shahreza
- District: Central
- City: Shahreza

Population (2006)
  - Total: 550
- Time zone: UTC+3:30 (IRST)

Manuchehrabad (Persian: منوچهراباد) (Note: Also romanized as Manūchehrābād; also known as Mansūrābād) is a neighborhood in the city of Shahreza in the Central District of Shahreza County, (Note: Formerly Qomsheh County) Isfahan province, Iran.

== Demographics ==
=== Population ===
At the time of the 2006 National Census, Manuchehrabad's population was 550 in 160 households, when it was a village in Dasht Rural District. After the census, Manuchehrabad was annexed by the city of Shahreza.
