= Yahyaabad, Shahreza =

Village in Isfahan province, Iran

Yahyaabad Persian: يحيي اباد
- Village
- Location within Iran
- Coordinates: 31°44′56″N 51°52′38″E
- Country: Iran
- Province: Isfahan
- County: Shahreza
- District: Central
- Rural District: Kahruiyeh

Population (2016)
  - Total: 70
- Time zone: UTC+3:30 (IRST)

Yahyaabad (Persian: يحيي اباد) (Note: Also romanized as Yaḩyáābād; also known as Eḩyā’ābād, Ehyābād, and Yaḩyāābād-e Bozorg) is a village in Kahruiyeh Rural District of the Central District in Shahreza County, (Note: Formerly Qomsheh County) Isfahan province, Iran.

== Demographics ==
=== Population ===
At the time of the 2006 National Census, the village's population was 83 in 26 households. The following census in 2011 counted 76 people in 25 households. The 2016 census measured the population of the village as 70 people in 26 households.
