= Sahray =

Sahray (Persian: صحرائ) may refer to various places in Iran:

- Sahray-e Bugal
- Sahray-e Nimeh

== See also ==
- Sohray (disambiguation), various places in Iran
