= Qasr-e Cham =

Village in Isfahan province, Iran

Qasr-e Cham Persian: قصرچم
- Village
- Location within Iran
- Coordinates: 31°53′13″N 51°48′57″E
- Country: Iran
- Province: Isfahan
- County: Shahreza
- District: Central
- Rural District: Manzariyeh

Population (2016)
  - Total: 1,822
- Time zone: UTC+3:30 (IRST)

Qasr-e Cham (Persian: قصرچم) (Note: Also romanized as Qaşr-e Cham; also known as ‘Aşr-e Shām, Asricham, and Qaşr-e Jam) is a village in Manzariyeh Rural District of the Central District in Shahreza County, (Note: Formerly Qomsheh County) Isfahan province, Iran.

== Demographics ==
=== Population ===
At the time of the 2006 National Census, the village's population was 1,716 in 408 households. The following census in 2011 counted 1,606 people in 426 households. The 2016 census measured the population of the village as 1,822 people in 515 households.
