= Huk, Isfahan =

Village in Isfahan province, Iran

Huk Persian: هوك
- Village
- Location within Iran
- Coordinates: 31°43′59″N 51°41′26″E
- Country: Iran
- Province: Isfahan
- County: Shahreza
- District: Central
- Rural District: Kahruiyeh

Population (2016)
  - Total: 144
- Time zone: UTC+3:30 (IRST)

Huk (Persian: هوك) (Note: Also romanized as Hūk) is a village in Kahruiyeh Rural District of the Central District in Shahreza County, (Note: Formerly Qomsheh County) Isfahan province, Iran.

== Demographics ==
=== Population ===
At the time of the 2006 National Census, the village's population was 133 in 28 households. The following census in 2011 counted 75 people in 17 households. The 2016 census measured the population of the village as 144 people in 37 households.
