= Bavan, Isfahan =

Bavan بوان
- Village
- Location within Iran
- Coordinates: 31°51′21″N 51°56′21″E
- Country: Iran
- Province: Isfahan
- County: Shahreza
- Bakhsh: Central
- Rural District: Manzariyeh

Population (2006)
  - Total: 179
- Time zone: UTC+3:30 (IRST)
  - Summer (DST): UTC+4:30 (IRDT)

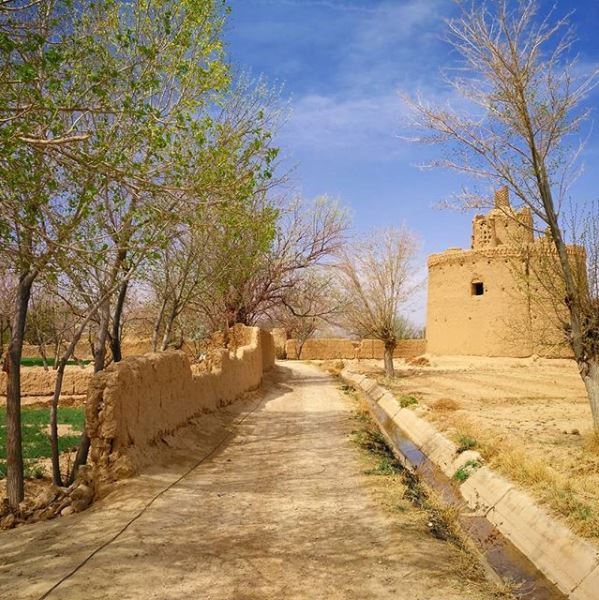
Bavan village.

Bavan (Persian: بوان, also Romanized as Bavān and Bovān; also known as Bohon and Bohun) is a village in Manzariyeh Rural District, in the Central District of Shahreza County, Isfahan Province, Iran. At the 2006 census, its population was 179, in 62 families.
