= Cheshmeh-ye Ruy =

Village in Isfahan province, Iran

Cheshmeh-ye Ruy Persian: چشمه روي
- Village
- Country: Iran
- Province: Isfahan
- County: Shahreza
- District: Central
- Rural District: Esfarjan

Population (2016)
  - Total: 15
- Time zone: UTC+3:30 (IRST)

Cheshmeh-ye Ruy (Persian: چشمه روي) (Note: Also romanized as Cheshmeh-ye Rūy) is a village in Esfarjan Rural District of the Central District in Shahreza County, (Note: Formerly Qomsheh County) Isfahan province, Iran.

== Demographics ==
=== Population ===
At the time of the 2006 National Census, the village's population was 40 in 20 households. The following census in 2011 counted a population below the reporting threshold. The 2016 census measured the population of the village as 15 people in five households.
