= Qavamabad, Isfahan =

Village in Isfahan province, Iran

Qavamabad Persian: قوام اباد
- Village
- Location within Iran
- Coordinates: 31°53′27″N 51°55′43″E
- Country: Iran
- Province: Isfahan
- County: Shahreza
- District: Central
- Rural District: Manzariyeh

Population (2016)
  - Total: 193
- Time zone: UTC+3:30 (IRST)

Qavamabad (Persian: قوام اباد) (Note: Also romanized as Qavāmābād, Qavvāmābād, and Qawwāmābād) is a village in Manzariyeh Rural District of the Central District in Shahreza County, (Note: Formerly Qomsheh County) Isfahan province, Iran.

== Demographics ==
=== Population ===
At the time of the 2006 National Census, the village's population was 186 in 47 households. The following census in 2011 counted 188 people in 55 households. The 2016 census measured the population of the village as 193 people in 61 households.
