= Sohray Amiriyeh =

Village in Isfahan province, Iran

Sohray Amiriyeh Persian: صحرائ اميريه
- Village
- Country: Iran
- Province: Isfahan
- County: Shahreza
- District: Central
- Rural District: Dasht

Population (2016)
  - Total: 30
- Time zone: UTC+3:30 (IRST)

Sohray Amiriyeh (Persian: صحرائ اميريه) (Note: Also romanized as Şoḩrāy Āmīrīyeh) is a village in Dasht Rural District of the Central District in Shahreza County, (Note: Formerly Qomsheh County) Isfahan province, Iran.

== Demographics ==
=== Population ===
At the time of the 2006 National Census, the village's population was 55 in 10 households. The following census in 2011 counted 93 people in 28 households. The 2016 census measured the population of the village as 30 people in eight households.
