= Veshareh, Isfahan =

Village in Isfahan province, Iran

Veshareh Persian: وشاره
- Village
- Location within Iran
- Coordinates: 31°50′04″N 51°59′21″E
- Country: Iran
- Province: Isfahan
- County: Shahreza
- District: Central
- Rural District: Manzariyeh

Population (2016)
  - Total: 485
- Time zone: UTC+3:30 (IRST)

Vashareh (Persian: وشاره) (Note: Also romanized as Vashāreh) is a village in Manzariyeh Rural District of the Central District in Shahreza County, (Note: Formerly Qomsheh County) Isfahan province, Iran.

== Demographics ==
=== Population ===
At the time of the 2006 National Census, the village's population was 488 in 150 households. The following census in 2011 counted 438 people in 139 households. The 2016 census measured the population of the village as 485 people in 159 households.
