= Khuzestan Vali-e-Asr Corps =

- سپاه ولی عصر خوزستان
- Country: Iran
- Branch: Iranian Armed Forces
- Type: Provincial Corps of the Islamic Revolutionary Guard Corps
- Size: Corps
- Garrison/HQ: Ahvaz, Khuzestan province

Commanders
- Current commander: IRGC Brigadier General Hassan Shahvarpour

The Khuzestan Vali-e-Asr Corps is a provincial military-security unit under Iran’s Islamic Revolutionary Guard Corps (IRGC), headquartered in Ahvaz. It oversees all IRGC and Basij forces operating in Khuzestan Province. The unit traces its origins to December 1981, with the creation of the 7th Vali-e-Asr Brigade during the Iran–Iraq War. It became the Khuzestan Vali-e-Asr Corps in 2008, following the IRGC’s structural reforms that merged its Basij and Ground Forces units in the province. Key subordinate units include:

- 7th Vali-Asr Armored Division
- 15th Imam Hassan Behbahan Special Forces Brigade
- Hazrat Mahdi Andimeshk Ranger Brigade
- 51st Hojjat Ahvaz Armored Brigade
- 64th Al-Hadid Missile and Artillery Group

In addition, the 72nd Armored Brigade of Muharram Abadan from the IRGC Ground Forces and the 3rd Marine Region of Imam Hossein Nadsa from the IRGC Navy operate in coordination with the Corps. The Vali-e-Asr Corps also commands 29 Basij regional units—including those in Ahvaz, Dezful, Masjed-Soleiman, Abadan, Khorramshahr, Andimeshk, Izeh, Behbahan, Shushtar, Mahshahr, and Ramhormoz—as well as Jerusalem Rapid Reaction Battalions, Imam Ali Security Battalions, and Basij Imam Hossein and Al-Zahra units. The Corps is currently commanded by Brigadier General Hassan Shahvarpour.
