= Khatam al-Anbia Air Defense Academy =

Iranian military academy

Khatam al-Anbia Air Defense University AJA
- دانشگاه پدافند هوایی خاتم‌الانبیاء آجا
- Seal of the University
- Type: Military Academy
- Established: 2013
- Affiliations: Islamic Republic of Iran Air Defense Force
- Commandant: 2nd Brigadier General Bijan Saedi
- Location: Tehran, Iran
- Campus: Urban

Khatam al-Anbia Air Defense University AJA (Persian: دانشگاه پدافند هوایی خاتم‌الانبیاء آجا) is a military academy located in Tehran, affiliated with Iran's Air Defense Force. This University was established after separation of Air Defense Base from Islamic Republic of Iran Air Force in 2009. The main purpose of establishing this university is training educated officers in the various fields of Air Defense and providing specialized services to the Air Defense Force and other Armed Forces.

== Fields and Faculties ==
Air Defense University has three faculty and educate cadet officers in these special fields.

	Faculty	Field of Study
1	Control and Command Engineering Faculty	Aerial Control and Command - Missile Operations
2	Control and Command Engineering Faculty	Aerial Control and Command - Fighter Control
3	Control and Command Engineering Faculty	Aerial Control and Command - Intelligence Operations
4	Electrical Engineering Faculty	Electrical Engineering - Electronics
5	Electrical Engineering Faculty	Electrical Engineering - Telecommunications
6	Electrical Engineering Faculty	Electrical Engineering - Cyber Warfare
7	Mechanical Engineering Faculty	Maintenance Engineering of Air Defense Systems Equipment

=== Required Fields ===
Required fields for studying in Air Defense University includes:

	Field of Study	Education Place
1	Software Engineering	Shahid Sattari Aeronautical University
2	Management - Logistic	Shahid Sattari Aeronautical University
3	Management - Cargo	Imam Ali Officers' Academy
4	Management - Military Police	Imam Ali Officers' Academy
5	Management - Financial Affairs	Imam Ali Officers' Academy
6	Management - Administrative Affairs	Imam Ali Officers' Academy
7	Management - Infantry	Imam Ali Officers' Academy

== Commandment ==
The first commander of Air Defense University was Colonel Moharram Qolizadeh, who died on 10 November 2011 of a heart attack. He was Deputy of Cyber Warfare of Air Defense Force. After him, Colonel Abbas Farajpour Alamdari was appointed for Air Defense University administrator.
