= Kioumars Heydari =

Iranian military officer (born 1964)

Amir Kioumars Heydari
- کیومرث حیدری
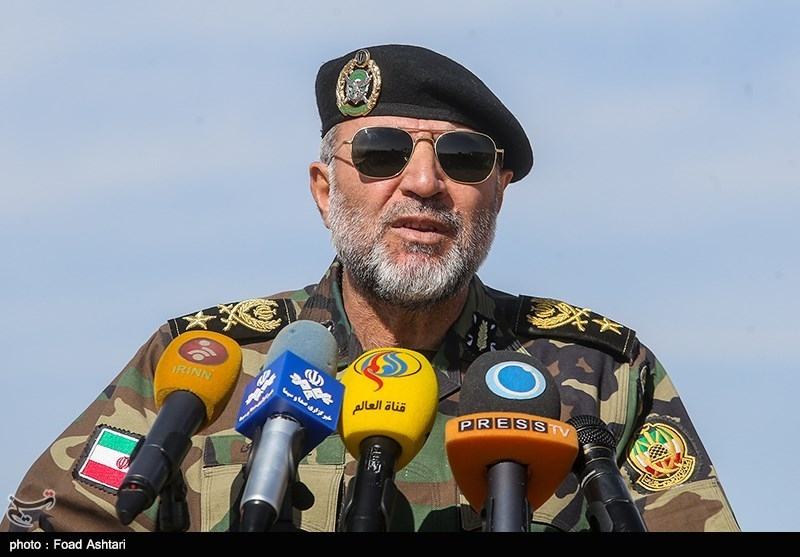
- Heydari in 2019

Deputy Chief of the General Staff of the Iranian Armed Forces
- Incumbent
- Assumed office 10 August 2026
- President: Masoud Pezeshkian
- Supreme Leader: Mojtaba Khamenei
- Preceded by: Mohammad-Reza Gharaei Ashtiani

Deputy Commander of Khatam al-Anbiya Central Headquarters
- Incumbent
- Assumed office 25 November 2025
- President: Masoud Pezeshkian
- Supreme Leader: Ali Khamenei; Mojtaba Khamenei
- Preceded by: Hossein Hassani Sa'di

Commander of the Iranian Army Ground Forces
- In office 19 November 2016 – 22 November 2025
- President: Hassan Rouhani; Ebrahim Raisi; Mohammad Mokhber (acting); Masoud Pezeshkian
- Supreme Leader: Ali Khamenei
- Preceded by: Ahmad Reza Pourdastan
- Succeeded by: Ali Jahanshahi

Deputy Commander of the Iranian Army Ground Forces
- In office 2008–2016
- President: Mahmoud Ahmadinejad; Hassan Rouhani
- Supreme Leader: Ali Khamenei
- Preceded by: Ahmad Reza Pourdastan
- Succeeded by: Nozhar Nemati

Coordinating Deputy of the Iranian Army Ground Forces
- In office 2005–2008
- President: Mahmoud Ahmadinejad
- Supreme Leader: Ali Khamenei
- Preceded by: Mohammad Ali Armanfar
- Succeeded by: Mohammad Hassan Bagheri

Personal details
- Born: 1964 (age 61–62) Sahneh, Kermanshah province, Pahlavi Iran
- Awards: Order of Fath (1st class)

Military service
- Allegiance: Iran
- Branch/service: Basij; Ground Force
- Years of service: 1982–present
- Rank: Brigadier General
- Unit: 81st Armored Division of Kermanshah
- Commands: Operations Deputy of the Iranian Army Ground Forces (2005); South-West Regional Headquarters (1998–2005)
- Battles/wars: Iran–Iraq War; Insurgency in Sistan and Balochistan; Syrian civil war; Iranian intervention in Syria; Iran–PJAK conflict; Western Iran clashes; Twelve-Day War; 2026 Iran war

Kioumars Heydari (Persian: کیومرث حیدری; born 1964) is an Iranian Brigadier general who is currently serving as the deputy commander of the Islamic Republic of Iran Armed Forces since 2026 and the Khatam al-Anbiya Central Headquarters since 2025. He was Commander of the Islamic Republic of Iran Ground Forces.

== Biography ==
Kioumars Heydari was born in 1964 in the city of Sahneh, Kermanshah, and completed his primary and secondary education in Kermanshah. Before joining the Army, he began his military activities in 1982 during the Iran–Iraq War as a volunteer force in the Basij. Heydari joined the Army Ground Forces in 1984, starting his official career in the infantry branch of the 81st Armored Division of Kermanshah. Between 1984 and 1998, he gained experience commanding platoons, companies, and battalions within this unit.

Heydari was appointed commander of the South West Headquarters of the Ground Forces (NEZAJA) in 1998 and served in this position until 2005. He received the rank of Brigadier General in 2005. He briefly held the position of operations deputy for the Army Ground Forces in 2005, and served as the coordinating deputy of the Army Ground Forces (Chief of Staff of NEZAJA) from 2005 to 2008. Heydari was appointed deputy commander of the Army Ground Forces in 2008 and remained in this role until November 2016.

Heydari was appointed as the Commander of the Islamic Republic of Iran Ground Forces in 19 November 2016 serving in this position until 22 November 2025.

In 2022, Heydari was added to the sanctions list of the OFAC and the European Union, alongside other senior figures in the Iranian army. In 2023, he was also placed on the UK sanctions list. The sanctions against him and other senior figures stemmed mainly from violations of human rights and the repression of Iranian citizens in anti-regime protests of 2018-2019.

On 13 June 2025, during the Twelve-Day War, Israel reportedly carried out an assassination attempt against Heydari, which he survived. In November 2025, he was appointed deputy commander of the Khatam al-Anbiya Central Headquarters.

In August 2026, he was appointed by Supreme Leader Mojtaba Khamenei as deputy commander of the General Staff of the Armed Forces of the Islamic Republic of Iran.

Military offices
Preceded by Ahmad Reza Pourdastan	Commander of Islamic Republic of Iran Army's Ground Forces; 19 November 2016–22 November 2025	Succeeded by Ali Jahanshahi
