= Bohon =

Bohon may refer to:

- Bahon, Haiti
- Bahon, Iran
- Bohon, Mali

A former medieval manor named Bohon (or Bohun), on the Cotentin Peninsula of Normandy, France, and surviving in:

- Saint-André-de-Bohon
- Saint-Georges-de-Bohon
