= Sohray Zareheh =

Village in Isfahan province, Iran

Sohray Zareheh Persian: صحرائ زرهه
- Village
- Country: Iran
- Province: Isfahan
- County: Shahreza
- District: Central
- Rural District: Dasht

Population (2016)
  - Total: 0
- Time zone: UTC+3:30 (IRST)

Sohray Zareheh (Persian: صحرائ زرهه) (Note: Also romanized as Şoḩrāy Zareheh) is a village in Dasht Rural District of the Central District in Shahreza County, (Note: Formerly Qomsheh County) Isfahan province, Iran.

== Demographics ==
=== Population ===
At the time of the 2006 National Census, the village's population was 15 in five households. The following census in 2011 counted a population below the reporting threshold. The 2016 census measured the population of the village as zero.
