= Samirum =

Samirum may refer to:

- Izadkhvast, a city in Fars Province, Iran
- Semirom, a city in Isfahan Province, Iran
- Esfarjan, a village in Isfahan Province, Iran
