= Ali Abdollahi =

Iranian military officer and politician (born 1959)

Sardar Ali Abdollahi Aliabadi
- علی عبداللهی علی‌آبادی
- Abdollahi in 2026

4th Chief of the General Staff of the Islamic Republic of Iran Armed Forces
- Incumbent
- Assumed office 10 August 2026
- President: Masoud Pezeshkian
- Deputy: Kioumars Heydari
- Supreme Leader: Mojtaba Khamenei
- Preceded by: Abdolrahim Mousavi

Commander of Khatam al-Anbiya Central Headquarters
- Incumbent
- Assumed office 17 June 2025
- President: Masoud Pezeshkian
- Supreme Leader: Ali Khamenei; Mojtaba Khamenei
- Preceded by: Ali Shadmani

Deputy for Coordination of the General Staff
- In office 2016–2025
- President: Hassan Rouhani; Ebrahim Raisi; Mohammad Mokhber (acting); Masoud Pezeshkian
- Supreme Leader: Ali Khamenei

Deputy for Readiness, Logistics and Industrial Research of the General Staff
- In office 2013–2016
- President: Hassan Rouhani
- Supreme Leader: Ali Khamenei

Deputy minister of interior for Security
- In office 14 October 2009 – 29 June 2014
- President: Mahmoud Ahmadinejad; Hassan Rouhani
- Supreme Leader: Ali Khamenei
- Preceded by: Abbas Mohtaj
- Succeeded by: Hossein Zolfaghari

Governor-general of Semnan province
- In office 16 September 2007 – 14 October 2009
- President: Mahmoud Ahmadinejad
- Supreme Leader: Ali Khamenei
- Preceded by: Hamid Hajiabdolvahab
- Succeeded by: Abbas Rahi

Governor-general of Gilan province
- In office 16 November 2005 – 8 September 2007
- President: Mahmoud Ahmadinejad
- Supreme Leader: Ali Khamenei
- Preceded by: Masoud Soltanifar
- Succeeded by: Ruhollah Ghahremani

Commander-in-Chief of the Iranian Police
- In office 4 April – 9 July 2005; Acting
- President: Mohammad Khatami
- Supreme Leader: Ali Khamenei
- Preceded by: Mohammad Bagher Ghalibaf
- Succeeded by: Esmail Ahmadi-Moghaddam

Deputy Commander-in-Chief of the Iranian Police
- In office 2002–2005
- President: Mohammad Khatami
- Supreme Leader: Ali Khamenei
- Preceded by: Amir-Ali Amiri
- Succeeded by: Hossein Zolfaghari

Coordinating Deputy of the Iranian Police
- In office 2001–2002
- President: Mohammad Khatami
- Supreme Leader: Ali Khamenei
- Preceded by: Esmail Ahmadi-Moghaddam
- Succeeded by: Rahim Yaghoubi

Deputy Commander of the IRGC Aerospace Force
- In office 1997–2001
- President: Mohammad Khatami
- Supreme Leader: Ali Khamenei
- Preceded by: Amir Hayat-Moqaddam
- Succeeded by: Amir Hayat-Moqaddam

Personal details
- Born: 1959 (age 66–67) Aliabad, Rudbar, Pahlavi Iran

Military service
- Allegiance: Iran
- Branch/service: Islamic Revolutionary Guard Corps; Police Command
- Years of service: 1979–present
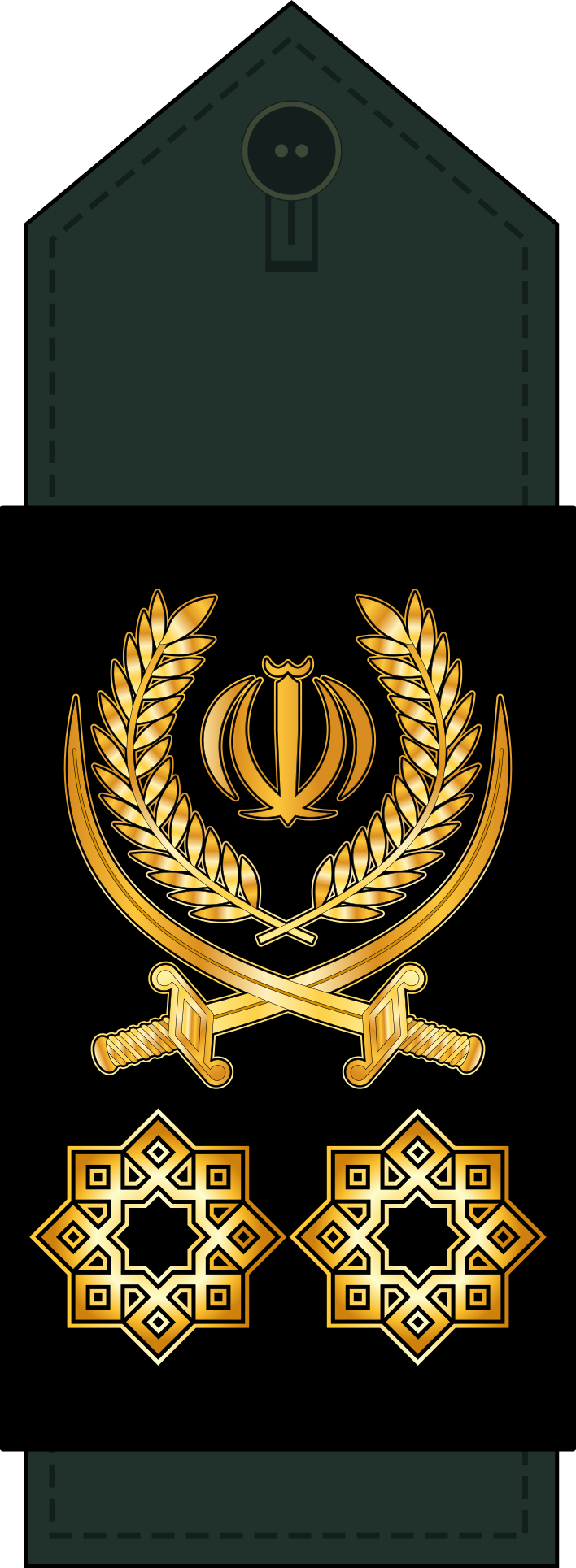
- Rank: Major General
- Unit: Ground Forces
- Commands: 16th Quds Division (1987–1991)
- Battles/wars: Iran–Iraq War; Insurgency in Sistan and Balochistan; Syrian civil war; Iranian intervention in Syria; War in Iraq (2013–2017); Iranian intervention in Iraq; Iran–PJAK conflict; Western Iran clashes; 2019–2021 Persian Gulf crisis; 2024 Iran–Israel conflict; Twelve-Day War; 2026 Iran War

Ali Abdollahi Aliabadi (Persian: علی عبداللهی علی‌آبادی; born 1959) is an Iranian senior military officer and former politician who is currently chief of the General Staff of the Armed Forces of the Islamic Republic of Iran and commander of the Khatam al-Anbiya Central Headquarters. He served as governor-general of Gilan province and Semnan province and deputy interior minister during the presidency of Mahmoud Ahmadinejad.

Abdollahi is sanctioned by the US Department of the Treasury.

Abdollahi participated in the 2022 Moscow conference on international security as deputy chief of the general staff of the Armed Forces of the Islamic Republic. In the conference, Aliabadi referred to the United States as “Big Satan” and said that American totalitarianism and unilaterism threatens global security. Abdollahi in the conference also said that Americans cause crisis, sanctions and wars.

In 2025, an X account claiming to be associated with the Mossad announced that Abdollahi is the new commander of the Khatam al-Anbiya Central Headquarters, after commanders Gholam Ali Rashid and Ali Shadmani were assassinated in the Twelve-Day War. The Mossad has not denied connection to the account. In August 2026, he was appointed chief of staff of the Islamic Republic of Iran Armed Forces by Supreme Leader Mojtaba Khamenei, with Kioumars Heydari being named his deputy. Khamenei concurrently instructed Abdollahi to complete the merger of the General Staff with the Khatam al-Anbiya Central Headquarters.

== Military career ==
Offices held by General Abdollahi include:

- Commander, 16th Quds Division (1987–1991)
- Commander of Headquarters, Revolutionary Guards Ground Force
- Head of Inspection Circle, Revolutionary Guards Joint Staff
- Deputy Commander, Revolutionary Guards Air Force (1997–2001)
- Deputy for Coordination, Law Enforcement Force (2001–2002)
- Deputy Commander, Law Enforcement Force (2002–2005)
- Caretaker, Law Enforcement Force (2005)
- Deputy for Readiness, Logistics and Industrial Research, General Staff of Armed Forces (2013–2016)
- Deputy for Coordination, General Staff of Armed Forces (2016–2025)
- Commander, Khatam al-Anbiya Central Headquarters (2025–present)
- Chief of the General Staff, Islamic Republic of Iran Armed Forces (2026–present)

== See also ==
- List of Iranian two-star generals since 1979

Military offices
Preceded by Abdolrahim Mousavi	Chief-of-Staff of the Iranian Armed Forces; 10 August 2026–present	Incumbent
Preceded by Ali Shadmani	Commander of the Khatam al-Anbiya Central Headquarters; 17 June 2025–present	Incumbent
Preceded by ?	Deputy for Coordination of the General Staff; 2016–2025	Succeeded by ?
Preceded by ?	Deputy for Readiness, Logistics and Industrial Research of the General Staff; 2013–2016	Succeeded by ?
Government offices
Preceded by Abbas Mohtaj	Vice Minister of Interior for Security; 14 October 2009–29 June 2014	Succeeded by Hossein Zolfaghari
Preceded by Hamid Hajiabdolvahab	Governor-general of Semnan province 16 September 2007–14 October 2009	Succeeded by Abbas Rahi
Preceded by Masoud Soltanifar	Governor-general of Gilan province 16 November 2005–8 September 2007	Succeeded by Ruhollah Ghahremani
Police appointments
Preceded by Mohammad Bagher Ghalibaf	Commander of the Law Enforcement Force (Caretaker); 4 April–9 July 2005	Succeeded by Esmail Ahmadi-Moghaddam
Preceded by Amir-Ali Amiri	Deputy Commander of the Law Enforcement Force; 2002–2005	Succeeded by Hossein Zolfaghari
Preceded by Esmail Ahmadi-Moghaddam	Coordinating Deputy of the Law Enforcement Force; 2001–2002	Succeeded by Rahim Yaghoubi
