= Dasht Rural District =

Dasht Rural District (Persian: دهستان دشت) may refer to:

- Dasht Rural District (Meshgin Shahr County), Ardabil province
- Dasht Rural District (Isfahan Province)
- Dasht Rural District (Urmia County), West Azerbaijan province

== See also ==
- Dasht-e Bil Rural District
