= Sohray Ghazanfariyeh-ye Jonubi =

Village in Isfahan province, Iran

Sohray Ghazanfariyeh-ye Jonubi Persian: صحرائ غضنفريه جنوبي
- Village
- Country: Iran
- Province: Isfahan
- County: Shahreza
- District: Central
- Rural District: Dasht

Population (2016)
  - Total: 0
- Time zone: UTC+3:30 (IRST)

Sohray Ghazanfariyeh-ye Jonubi (Persian: صحرائ غضنفريه جنوبي) (Note: Also romanized as Şoḩrāy Ghaẕanfarīyeh-ye Jonūbī) is a village in Dasht Rural District of the Central District in Shahreza County, (Note: Formerly Qomsheh County) Isfahan province, Iran.

== Demographics ==
=== Population ===
At the time of the 2006 National Census, the village's population was 188 in 39 households. The following census in 2011 counted 343 people in 67 households. The 2016 census measured the population of the village as zero.
