= Sohray Kallah Qazi =

Village in Isfahan province, Iran

Sohray Kallah Qazi Persian: صحرائ كلاه قاضي
- Village
- Country: Iran
- Province: Isfahan
- County: Shahreza
- District: Central
- Rural District: Dasht

Population (2016)
  - Total: 0
- Time zone: UTC+3:30 (IRST)

Sohray Kallah Qazi (Persian: صحرائ كلاه قاضي) (Note: Also romanized as Şoḩrāy Kallāh Qāẕī) is a village in Dasht Rural District of the Central District in Shahreza County, (Note: Formerly Qomsheh County) Isfahan province, Iran.

== Demographics ==
=== Population ===
At the time of the 2006 National Census, the village's population was 11 in seven households. The following census in 2011 counted 24 people in 10 households. The 2016 census measured the population of the village as zero.
