= Esfarjan =

Village in Isfahan province, Iran

Esfarjan Persian: اسفرجان
- Village
- Location within Iran
- Coordinates: 31°39′55″N 51°54′54″E
- Country: Iran
- Province: Isfahan
- County: Shahreza
- District: Central
- Rural District: Esfarjan

Population (2016)
  - Total: 1,904
- Time zone: UTC+3:30 (IRST)

Esfarjan (Persian: اسفرجان) (Note: Also romanized as Esfarjān; also known as Esfaranjān, Samīrum, Semīrom, and Usburjān) is a village in, and the capital of, Esfarjan Rural District in the Central District of Shahreza County, (Note: Formerly Qomsheh County) Isfahan province, Iran.

== Demographics ==
=== Population ===
At the time of the 2006 National Census, the village's population was 2,724 in 838 households. The following census in 2011 counted 2,518 people in 825 households. The 2016 census measured the population of the village as 1,904 people in 674 households.
