= Ali Jahanshahi =

Iranian general

Amir Ali Jahanshahi
- علی جهانشاهی
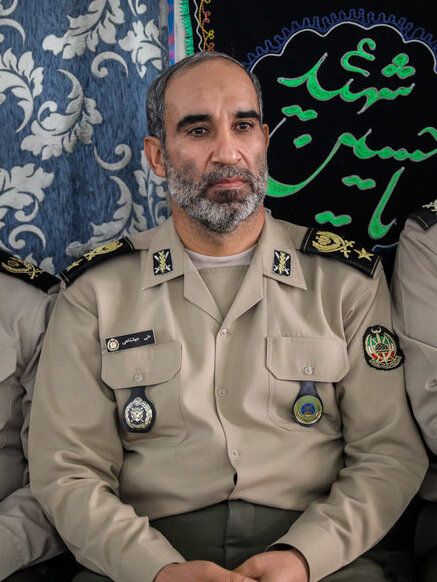
- Jahanshahi in 2018
- Born: Sahneh, Kermanshah province, Pahlavi Iran
- Military career
- Allegiance: Iran
- Branch: Ground Force
- Rank: Brigadier General
- Commands: Iranian Army Ground Forces (2025–present); Deputy head of field supervision and evaluation at the Khatam al-Anbiya Central Headquarters (2020–2025); Deputy Coordinator of the Iranian Army Ground Forces (2016–2020); Northeast Regional Headquarters of Nezaja (2013–2016); 77th Infantry Division of Khurasan (2011–2013); 04th Training Center (2007–2011)
- Conflicts: Iran–Iraq War; Iran–PJAK conflict; Western Iran clashes; 2024 Iran–Israel conflict; Twelve-Day War; 2026 Iran war

Ali Jahanshahi (Persian: علی جهانشاهی) is a Brigadier General of the Islamic Republic of Iran Army who has served as the Commander of the Ground Forces of the Islamic Republic of Iran Army since November 2025.

== Biography ==
From 2007 to 2011, he was the Commander of the 04th Training Center in Birjand and, while maintaining his position as a senior army officer in South Khorasan province, and from 2011 to 2013, he commanded the 77th Infantry Division of Khurasan.

Jahanshahi was the Commander of the Northeast Regional Headquarters of Nezaja from 2013 to 2016, and from 2016 to 2020, he served as the Deputy Coordinator of the Army Ground Forces and from from December 2020 to December 2025, he was the Deputy head for Field Supervision and Evaluation of the Khatam al-Anbiya Central Headquarters. He was promoted to the rank of Second brigadier general in 2011 and to the rank of Brigadier General in 2016.

Military offices
Preceded by Kioumars Heydari	Commander of Islamic Republic of Iran Army's Ground Forces; 22 November 2025–present	Succeeded by Incumbent
