= Sular, Iran =

Village in Isfahan province, Iran

Sular Persian: سولار
- Village
- Location within Iran
- Coordinates: 31°52′05″N 51°55′19″E
- Country: Iran
- Province: Isfahan
- County: Shahreza
- District: Central
- Rural District: Manzariyeh

Population (2016)
  - Total: 409
- Time zone: UTC+3:30 (IRST)

Sular (Persian: سولار) (Note: Also romanized as Sūlār; also known as Solār and Sūlāv) is a village in Manzariyeh Rural District of the Central District in Shahreza County, (Note: Formerly Qomsheh County) Isfahan province, Iran.

== Demographics ==
=== Population ===
At the time of the 2006 National Census, the village's population was 413 in 125 households. The following census in 2011 counted 454 people in 150 households. The 2016 census measured the population of the village as 409 people in 146 households.
