= Sular =

Sular may refer to:

- Nisoldipine, a pharmaceutical
- Sular, Iran, a village
