= Khuru, Iran =

Khuru or Khowru or Khurru (Persian: خورو) may refer to:

- Khuru, Fars
- Khuru, Isfahan
