= Veshareh =

Veshareh (Persian: وشاره) may refer to:

- Veshareh, Isfahan
- Veshareh, Qom
