= Kahruiyeh Rural District =

Rural district in Isfahan province, Iran

Kahruiyeh Rural District Persian: دهستان كهرويه
- Rural District
- Location within Iran
- Coordinates: 31°44′N 51°47′E
- Country: Iran
- Province: Isfahan
- County: Shahreza
- District: Central
- Established: 1987
- Capital: Kahruiyeh

Population (2016)
  - Total: 1,843
- Time zone: UTC+3:30 (IRST)

Kahruiyeh Rural District (Persian: دهستان كهرويه) is in the Central District of Shahreza County, (Note: Formerly Qomsheh County) Isfahan province, Iran. Its capital is the village of Kahruiyeh.

== Demographics ==
=== Population ===
At the time of the 2006 National Census, the rural district's population was 2,530 in 700 households. There were 2,183 inhabitants in 676 households at the following census of 2011. The 2016 census measured the population of the rural district as 1,843 in 642 households. The most populous of its eight villages was Kahruiyeh, with 1,629 people.

=== Other villages in the rural district ===
- Huk
- Yahyaabad
