= Mahyar, Isfahan =

Village in Isfahan province, Iran

Mahyar Persian: مهيار
- Village
- Location within Iran
- Coordinates: 32°16′22″N 51°48′11″E
- Country: Iran
- Province: Isfahan
- County: Shahreza
- District: Central
- Rural District: Dasht

Population (2016)
  - Total: 1,134
- Time zone: UTC+3:30 (IRST)

Mahyar (Persian: مهيار) (Note: Also romanized as Mahyār) is a village in, and the capital of, Dasht Rural District in the Central District of Shahreza County, (Note: Formerly Qomsheh County) Isfahan province, Iran.

== Demographics ==
=== Population ===
At the time of the 2006 National Census, the village's population was 1,362 in 347 households. The following census in 2011 counted 1,274 people in 367 households. The 2016 census measured the population of the village as 1,134 people in 334 households, the most populous in its rural district.
