= Hunjan =

Surname

ਹੁੰਜਣ

Regions with significant populations
- Punjab

Languages
- Punjabi

Religion
- Sikhism

Hunjan (Punjabi: ਹੁੰਜਣ, also known as Hunejan, Hanjan and or Hunzan) is a surname found among Punjabi Jatt and or Ramgarhia people originating from the Huns who invaded the region in antiquity. They are also the namesake for the village Hunejan in Iran.

Huns invading the Punjab region from Central Asia assimilated into the local community during the late antiquity era. Many descendants retained their ethnic designation through the surname "Hunjan" from: Huna (ਹੂਨਾ, "Hun") + -jana (-ਜਣ, "person"). Modern day descendants can trace their origin to Iranian, Turkic and or Indo-Aryan roots.

== Notable people with the surname ==
- Amrita Hunjan, British model and singer
