= Esmail Ahmadi-Moghaddam =

Iranian military officer

Sardar Esmail Ahmadi-Moghaddam
- اسماعیل احمدی‌مقدم
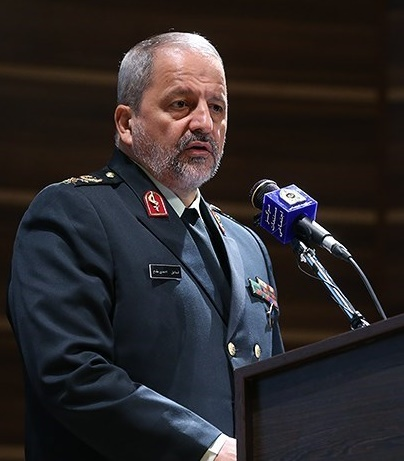
- Born: c. 1961 (age 64–65); Narmak, Tehran, Iran
- Military career
- Allegiance: Iran
- Branch: Revolutionary Committee; Revolutionary Guards; Basij; Law Enforcement Force
- Service years: 1980–2015
- Rank: Brigadier general
- Conflicts: Iran–Iraq War

Esmail Ahmadi-Moghaddam (Persian: اسماعیل احمدی‌مقدم) is an Iranian retired military officer who served as Iran's Chief of police, the chief commander of Law Enforcement Force of Islamic Republic of Iran, from 2005 to 2015.

Prior to the appointment, he served as deputy of Basij militia and its commander in Greater Tehran. Ahmadi-Moghaddam started his career at Islamic Revolution Committees and later was transferred to Islamic Revolutionary Guard Corps.

Ahmadi-Moghaddam has a BA in Social Sciences from University of Tehran and obtained a master's degree in defense management from Army's University of Command and Staff, followed by a Ph.D. from Supreme National Defense University in military sciences.

He served for a time as commandant of the Police University.

Police appointments
| Preceded by Ali Abdollahi (caretaker) | Commander-in-Chief of the Iranian Police; 9 July 2005 – 9 March 2015 | Succeeded by Hossein Ashtari |
