= Esfarjan Rural District =

Rural district in Isfahan province, Iran

Esfarjan Rural District Persian: دهستان اسفرجان
- Rural District
- Location within Iran
- Coordinates: 31°34′N 51°57′E
- Country: Iran
- Province: Isfahan
- County: Shahreza
- District: Central
- Established: 1987
- Capital: Esfarjan

Population (2016)
  - Total: 5,364
- Time zone: UTC+3:30 (IRST)

Esfarjan Rural District (Persian: دهستان اسفرجان) is in the Central District of Shahreza County, (Note: Formerly Qomsheh County) Isfahan province, Iran. Its capital is the village of Esfarjan.

== Demographics ==
=== Population ===
At the time of the 2006 National Census, the rural district's population was 6,760 in 1,934 households. There were 6,290 inhabitants in 1,922 households at the following census of 2011. The 2016 census measured the population of the rural district as 5,364 in 1,811 households. The most populous of its 16 villages was Hunejan, with 2,432 people.

=== Other villages in the rural district ===
- Aminabad
- Cheshmeh-ye Ruy
