= Kahruiyeh =

Village in Isfahan province, Iran

Kahruiyeh Persian: كهرويه
- Village
- Location within Iran
- Coordinates: 31°42′54″N 51°48′34″E
- Country: Iran
- Province: Isfahan
- County: Shahreza
- District: Central
- Rural District: Kahruiyeh

Population (2016)
  - Total: 1,629
- Time zone: UTC+3:30 (IRST)

Kahruiyeh (Persian: كهرويه) (Note: Also romanized as Kahruyeh, Kohruyeh and Kohrūyeh; also known as Khurru, Khūrū, Korūyeh, and Kūrū) is a village in, and the capital of, Kahruiyeh Rural District in the Central District of Shahreza County, (Note: Formerly Qomsheh County) Isfahan province, Iran.

== Demographics ==
=== Population ===
At the time of the 2006 National Census, the village's population was 2,310 in 643 households. The following census in 2011 counted 2,019 people in 629 households. The 2016 census measured the population of the village as 1,629 people in 579 households, the most populous in its rural district.
