= AJA University of Medical Sciences =

Coordinates: 35.72°N 51.38°E

- دانشگاه علوم پزشکی آجا
- Seal of the University
- Type: Military Medical School
- Established: 1955
- Affiliations: Islamic Republic of Iran Army
- Location: Tehran, Iran
- Website: www.ajaums.ac.ir

AJA University of Medical Sciences (Persian: دانشگاه علوم پزشکی آجا) is the medical school of Islamic Republic of Iran Army (Artesh), located in Tehran, Iran. The university enrolls top students of the Iranian University Entrance Exam, who are given the rank of first lieutenant upon graduating with a PhD.

== International Journals ==
1. Annals of Military and Health Sciences Research
2. Ebnesina
3. Journal of Educational Studies
4. Military Caring Sciences Journal
5. Nurse and Physician Within War
6. Paramedical Sciences and Military Health

== See also ==
- Higher Education in Iran
