= Sahray-e Bugal =

Sahray-e Bugal صحرائ بوگال
- Village
- Country: Iran
- Province: Fars
- County: Larestan
- Bakhsh: Central
- Rural District: Howmeh

Population (2006)
  - Total: 9
- Time zone: UTC+3:30 (IRST)
  - Summer (DST): UTC+4:30 (IRDT)

Sahray-e Bugal (Persian: صحرائ بوگال, also Romanized as Şaḩrāy-e Būgāl) is a village in Howmeh Rural District, in the Central District of Larestan County, Fars province, Iran. At the 2006 census, its population was 9, in 6 families.
