= Dasht Rural District (Shahreza County) =

Rural district in Isfahan province, Iran

Dasht Rural District Persian: دهستان دشت
- Rural District
- Location within Iran
- Coordinates: 32°11′N 51°50′E
- Country: Iran
- Province: Isfahan
- County: Shahreza
- District: Central
- Established: 1987
- Capital: Mahyar

Population (2016)
  - Total: 2,175
- Time zone: UTC+3:30 (IRST)

Dasht Rural District (Persian: دهستان دشت) is in the Central District of Shahreza County, (Note: Formerly Qomsheh County) Isfahan province, Iran. Its capital is the village of Mahyar.

== Demographics ==
=== Population ===
At the time of the 2006 National Census, the rural district's population was 4,853 in 1,311 households. There were 3,069 inhabitants in 941 households at the following census of 2011. The 2016 census measured the population of the rural district as 2,175 in 693 households. The most populous of its 40 villages was Mahyar, with 1,134 people.

=== Other villages in the rural district ===
- Emamzadeh Aliakbar
- Esfeh
- Sohray Amiriyeh
- Sohray Ghazanfariyeh-ye Jonubi
- Sohray Kallah Qazi
- Sohray Zareheh

=== Former villages now neighborhoods in the city of Shahreza ===
- Jarm Afshar
- Manuchehrabad
