= Manuchehrabad, Kermanshah =

Manuchehrabad منوچهراباد
- Village
- Location within Iran
- Coordinates: 34°18′35″N 47°09′20″E
- Country: Iran
- Province: Kermanshah
- County: Kermanshah
- Bakhsh: Central
- Rural District: Dorudfaraman

Population (2006)
  - Total: 618
- Time zone: UTC+3:30 (IRST)
  - Summer (DST): UTC+4:30 (IRDT)

Manuchehrabad (Persian: منوچهراباد, also Romanized as Manūchehrābād) is a village in Dorudfaraman Rural District, in the Central District of Kermanshah County, Kermanshah Province, Iran. At the 2006 census, its population was 618, in 137 families.
