= Ebrahim Zolfaghari =

Iranian military spokesperson

- ابراهیم ذوالفقاری
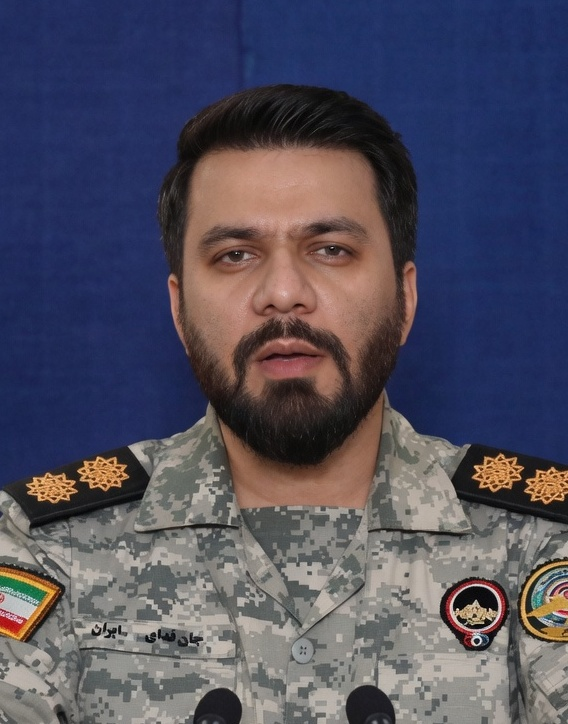
- Zolfaghari in 2026
- Military career
- Allegiance: Iran
- Branch: Islamic Republic of Iran Armed Forces
- Rank: Lieutenant Colonel
- Unit: Khatam al-Anbiya Central Headquarters
- Known for: Military spokesperson and public statements during regional tensions

Ebrahim Zolfaghari (Persian: ابراهیم ذوالفقاری) is an Iranian military officer and spokesperson for the Khatam al-Anbiya Central Headquarters, the joint operational command of the Islamic Republic of Iran Armed Forces.

He is known for representing Iran’s military leadership in official communications and for his public statements during regional tensions.

== Career ==
Zolfaghari holds the rank of Brigadier General within Iran's military structure and is affiliated with the country's defense establishment.

He serves as spokesperson for the Khatam al-Anbiya Central Headquarters, which coordinates operations between the Islamic Republic of Iran Army and the Islamic Revolutionary Guard Corps (IRGC).

== Public profile ==
Zolfaghari gained international attention in 2026 during heightened tensions involving Iran, the United States, and Israel, especially in the 2026 Iran war.

He stated that the United States was "negotiating with itself" while rejecting diplomatic efforts. He also said that wars are decided on the battlefield rather than on social media. He referenced U.S. President Donald Trump's phrase "You're fired" in a televised message, which was widely reported.

== Public image ==
Zolfaghari is regarded as part of Iran’s strategic communications apparatus, delivering official narratives on behalf of military leadership.

== See also ==
- Khatam al-Anbiya Central Headquarters
- Islamic Republic of Iran Armed Forces
- Islamic Revolutionary Guard Corps
- Islamic Republic of Iran Army
