= Manzariyeh =

City in Isfahan province, Iran

Manzariyeh Persian: منظریه
- City
- Location within Iran
- Coordinates: 31°56′43″N 51°52′02″E
- Country: Iran
- Province: Isfahan
- County: Shahreza
- District: Central
- Established as a city: 2000

Population (2016)
  - Total: 7,164
- Time zone: UTC+3:30 (IRST)

Manzariyeh (Persian: منظریه) (Note: Also romanized as Manz̧arīyeh) is a city in the Central District of Shahreza County, (Note: Formerly Qomsheh County) Isfahan province, Iran.

== History ==
In 2000, the villages of Babukan (بابوکان), Esfeh-ye Salar (اسفه سالار), Khosrowabad (خسرو آباد), Omarabad (عمرآباد), and Vasf (وصف) merged to form the new city of Manzariyeh.

== Demographics ==
=== Population ===
At the time of the 2006 National Census, the city's population was 5,617 in 1,621 households. The following census in 2011 counted 6,270 people in 1,909 households. The 2016 census measured the population of the city as 7,164 people in 2,249 households.
