= Khuru, Bhutan =

Khuru
- Location in Bhutan
- Coordinates: 27°32′24″N 89°52′48″E
- Country: Bhutan
- District: Punakha District

Population (2005)
  - Total: 2,292

Khuru is a town in Punakha District in central-western Bhutan. Khuru literally means "Darts" in Bhutan.

At the 2005 census, its population was 2,292.
