= Khatam al-Anbiya Central Headquarters =

Iranian military unit

Coordinates: 35°42′28″N 51°26′25″E

- قرارگاه مرکزی خاتم‌ الانبیا
- Country: Iran
- Branch: Islamic Republic of Iran Army; Islamic Revolutionary Guard Corps
- Type: Headquarters
- Part of: General Staff
- Location: Tehran

Commanders
- Current commander: Ali Abdollahi

The Khatam al-Anbiya Central Headquarters (KCHQ; Persian: قرارگاه مرکزی خاتم‌ الانبیا (ص)) is the operational headquarters of the Islamic Republic of Iran Armed Forces. It coordinates operations for the General Staff. It is tasked with planning and coordinating joint military operations within the Iranian forces. Its official spokesperson is Ebrahim Zolfaghari.

== Command structure ==
- Ayatollah Mojtaba Khamenei (Supreme Leader of Iran, Commander-in-Chief of the Iranian Armed Forces)
  - Minister of Defence Mehrdad Akhlaghi
  - Minister of Interior Brigadier General Eskandar Momeni
  - Chief of the General Staff of the Armed Forces Major General Ali Abdollahi
  - Deputy Chief of the General Staff of the Armed Forces Brigadier General Kioumars Heydari
  - Senior Military Advisor to the Leader of the Islamic Revolution Major General Yahya Rahim Safavi
- Commander-in-Chief of the Islamic Revolutionary Guard Corps, Major General Ahmad Vahidi
  - Deputy Commander of the IRGC, Major General Mostafa Izadi
  - Chief of the IRGC Joint Headquarters Brigadier General Hojjatollah Ghoreishi
  - Commander of IRGC Ground Force Brigadier General Mohammad Karami
  - Commander of the IRGC Aerospace Force Brigadier General Majid Mousavi
  - Commander of IRGC Navy Commodore Ali Azmaei
  - Commander of Quds Force Brigadier General Esmail Qaani
  - Commander of the Basij Resistance Force Brigadier General Hossein Taeb
- Commander-in-Chief of the Islamic Republic of Iran Army, Major General Amir Hatami
  - Deputy Commander in Chief of the Army Brigadier General Mohammad-Hossein Dadras
  - Chief of the Armed Forces Joint Headquarters Commodore Habibollah Sayyari
  - Commander of the Ground Forces, Brigadier General Ali Jahanshahi
  - Commander of the Air Force, Brigadier General Bahman Behmard
  - Commander of the Navy, Commodore Shahram Irani
  - Commander of Islamic Republic of Iran Air Defense Force, Brigadier General Alireza Elhami
- Police Command of the Islamic Republic of Iran
  - Chief commander of the Police Command Brigadier General Ahmad-Reza Radan

== History ==
In 2016, the KCHQ was separated from the General Staff as a standing independent command responsible for operational command and control (C2); previously, the KCHQ would only be stood up in wartime.

In April 2024, both the KCHQ and by then-commander Major General Gholam Ali Rashid were sanctioned by the United Kingdom and Canada in response to Operation True Promise, the Iranian missile attack against Israel on 13 April, which Iran said was in retaliation to the Israeli airstrike on the Iranian consulate in Damascus on 1 April.

On 13 June 2025, during the Twelve-Day War, Rashid was killed in an Israeli airstrike. He was succeeded by Brigadier General Ali Shadmani. Four days later, Shadmani was also killed in an Israeli airstrike. On 7 March 2026, during the 2026 Iran war, its chief of staff, Abolghasem Babaeian, who also was the military secretary of Iran's supreme leader was assassinated by Israel.

In August 2026, according to a decree issued by the office of Supreme Leader Mojtaba Khamenei and reported by state media on 10 August 2026, Abdollahi was appointed chief of staff of the Islamic Republic of Iran Armed Forces, with Kioumars Heydari named as his deputy; the same decree instructed him to complete the merger of the General Staff with the Khatam al-Anbiya Central Headquarters.

== Commanders ==
- Gholam Ali Rashid (5 July 2016–13 June 2025)
- Ali Shadmani (13 June 2025–17 June 2025)
- Ali Abdollahi (17 June 2025–Present)
