= Manzariyeh Rural District =

Rural district in Isfahan province, Iran

Manzariyeh Rural District Persian: دهستان منظريه
- Rural District
- Location within Iran
- Coordinates: 31°53′N 51°57′E
- Country: Iran
- Province: Isfahan
- County: Shahreza
- District: Central
- Established: 1987

Population (2016)
  - Total: 8,294
- Time zone: UTC+3:30 (IRST)

Manzariyeh Rural District (Persian: دهستان منظريه) is in the Central District of Shahreza County, (Note: Formerly Qomsheh County) Isfahan province, Iran. Its capital was the village of Omarabad, now a neighborhood in the city of Manzariyeh.

== Demographics ==
=== Population ===
At the time of the 2006 National Census, the rural district's population was 11,643 in 2,995 households. There were 7,953 inhabitants in 2,049 households at the following census of 2011. The 2016 census measured the population of the rural district as 8,294 in 2,109 households. The most populous of its 36 localities was Artillery Group 22 Garrison, with 4,049 people.

=== Other villages in the rural district ===
- Qasr-e Cham
- Qavamabad
- Sular
- Valandan
- Veshareh
- Ziaratgah
