= Iranian Armed Forces =

Combined military forces of Iran

- نیروهای مسلح جمهوری اسلامی ایران
- Logo of the General Staff of the Armed Forces

- Flag of the General Staff of the Armed Forces
- Current form: 1979
- Service branches: Islamic Republic of Iran Army; Islamic Revolutionary Guard Corps; Police Command
- Headquarters: Eshrat Abad, Tehran, Iran

Leadership
- Commander-in-chief: Supreme Leader Mojtaba Khamenei
- Minister of Defence and Armed Forces Logistics: Mehrdad Akhlaghi
- Minister of Interior: BG Eskandar Momeni
- Chief of the General Staff: MG Ali Abdollahi

Personnel
- Military age: 18
- Conscription: Yes
- Active personnel: 523,000 (IISS unchanged since 2023)
- Reserve personnel: 350,000 (IISS unchanged since 2023)

Expenditure
- Budget: US$24.6 billion (2021)
- Percent of GDP: 2.8% (2021)

Industry
- Domestic suppliers: DIO; IAIO; HESA; IACI; IHSRC; QAIC; AIO; IEI; MIO; SADRA; ISOICO

Related articles
- History: Military history of Iran; Kurdish separatism in Iran; Anglo-Soviet invasion of Iran; Iran crisis of 1946; Dhofar rebellion; Seizure of Abu Musa; Aftermath of the Iranian Revolution; Iran–Iraq War; Soviet–Afghan War; Iraqi Kurdish Civil War; Algerian Civil War; Bosnian War; 2001 uprising in Herat; Insurgency in Balochistan; Iranian intervention in Iraq (2014–present); Iranian intervention in the Syrian civil war; Tigray War; Ethiopian civil conflict (2018–present); Sudanese civil war (2023–present); Middle Eastern crisis
- Ranks: Military ranks of Iran

The Iranian Armed Forces, (Note: Persian: نيروهای مسلح ايران, romanized: Niruhâ-ye Mosallah-e Irân) officially the Islamic Republic of Iran Armed Forces, (Note: Persian: نيروهای مسلح جمهوری اسلامی ايران, romanized: Niruhâ-ye Mosallah-e Jomhuri-ye Eslâmi-ye Irân pronounced [niːɾuːˈhɒːje mosælˈlæhe d͡ʒʊmhuːˈɾiːje eslɒːˈmiːje iːˈɾɒːn]) are the military forces of Iran. It consists of the Islamic Republic of Iran Army (Artesh), the Islamic Revolutionary Guard Corps (IRGC) and the Police Command.

The International Institute for Strategic Studies has estimated since 2023 at least that the regular armed forces, the Artesh, and the Islamic Revolutionary Guard Corps are made up of approximately 570,000 active-duty personnel plus 350,000 reserve and trained personnel that can be mobilized when needed, bringing the country's military manpower to about 920,000 total personnel. These numbers do not include the Police Command or Basij.

The IRGC was established as a separated and parallel military force after the Iranian Revolution of 1979. It was established by a decree of May 1979. The IRGC is tasked with safeguarding the ideological foundations of the Islamic Republic and defending the regime against internal and external threats. It operates its own ground, naval, and air units, as well as the elite Quds Force, which is responsible for extraterritorial operations. The IRGC functions independently of the Artesh and often holds significant influence in strategic, security, and economic affairs within the country.

Both the Armed Forces and the IRGC provide essential security functions for Iran and coordinate regularly. But some rivalry remains, resulting from their uneven access to resources, varying levels of influence with the regime, and inherent overlap in missions and responsibilities. This setup has been criticized for its lack of transparency, limited parliamentary oversight, and its questionable contribution to national defense.

Most of Iran's weapons consists of equipment from its robust domestic rearmament program, which the country launched and its inventory has become increasingly indigenous. Most of the country's military hardware is domestically manufactured, and Iran had become an exporter of arms by the 2000s. Unable to import weapon systems from abroad due to international and U.S. sanctions, and suffering from an increasingly aging air force fleet, Iran has invested considerable funds into an ambitious ballistic and cruise missile program for mid-range strike capability, and has manufactured different types of arms and munitions, including tanks, armoured vehicles and drones, as well as various naval assets and aerial defense systems.

Iran's ballistic missile and space program is an internationally hot political topic over which it has consistently refused to negotiate. Iranian authorities state that the country's missile program is not designed to deliver nuclear payloads, but is used only for surgical strikes. It is therefore not relevant to any nuclear negotiations with the P5+1. The Iranian drone program has also raised concerns in the Western world, especially with proliferation among Iranian-allied forces in the Middle East, as well as exports to countries hostile to the U.S.

All branches of the armed forces fall under the command of the General Staff of the Iranian Armed Forces. The Ministry of Defense and Armed Forces Logistics is responsible for planning logistics and funding of the armed forces and is not involved with in-the-field military operational command. The commander-in-chief of the armed forces is the Supreme Leader.

== History ==
Iran started a major campaign to produce and stockpile chemical weapons after a truce was agreed with Iraq after 1980–88 Iran–Iraq War. However, Iran ratified the Chemical Weapons Convention in 1997. Iranian troops and civilians suffered tens of thousands of casualties from Iraqi chemical weapons during the 1980–88 Iran–Iraq War.

Since 2003, there have been repeated US and British allegations that Iranian forces were covertly involved in the Iraq War. In 2004, Iranian armed forces seized Royal Navy personnel, on the Shatt al-Arab (Arvand Rud in Persian) river, between Iran and Iraq. They were released three days later following diplomatic discussions between the UK and Iran.

In 2007, Iranian Revolutionary Guard forces also took prisoner Royal Navy personnel prisoner when a boarding party from HMS Cornwall was seized in the waters between Iran and Iraq, in the Persian Gulf. They were released thirteen days later.

Since 1979, there have been no foreign military bases present in Iran. According to Article 146 of the Iranian Constitution, the establishment of any foreign military base in the country is forbidden, even for peaceful purposes.

On 4 December 2011, an American Lockheed Martin RQ-170 Sentinel unmanned aerial vehicle (UAV) was captured by Iranian forces near the city of Kashmar in northeastern Iran.

In 2012, it was announced that Iran's Quds Force is operating inside Syria providing the government of Bashar al-Assad with intelligence and direction against rebel opposition.

In December 2012, Iran stated it had captured a U.S. Boeing Insitu ScanEagle UAV that violated its airspace over the Persian Gulf. Iran later stated it had also captured two other ScanEagles.

In 2013, Iran was reported to be supplying money, equipment, technological expertise and Uninhibited aerial vehicles to the former Ba'athist Syrian government and Hezbollah during the Syrian civil war, as well as to the Iraqi government and its state-sponsored organizations like the Popular Mobilization Forces, and the Peshmerga during the War on ISIL.

In November 2015, Iranian special forces assisted in the rescue of a Russian pilot that was shot down by Turkey, over Syria.

In April 2016, Iran sent advisors from the 65th Airborne Special Forces Brigade to Syria in support of the government.

In 2016, Revolutionary Guard forces captured US Navy personnel when their boats entered Iranian territorial waters off the coast of Farsi Island in the Persian Gulf. They were released the next day following diplomatic discussions between the US and Iran.

In March 2021 state TV in Iran showed footage of a "missile city" armed with ballistic and cruise weapons described as "a new Revolutionary Guard base" along the Gulf coast.

In March 2023, Iran began the process of allowing women to enlist in the military for the first time since the White Revolution.

After the beginning of the 2026 Iran war, Iran, which lacks the long-range military strike capabilities, such as intercontinental ballistic missiles or heavy bombers, required to directly hit the continental United States mainland, fired large numbers of missiles at Israel and US military bases in the Middle East in response to the Israeli and U.S. air campaigns.

== Structure ==
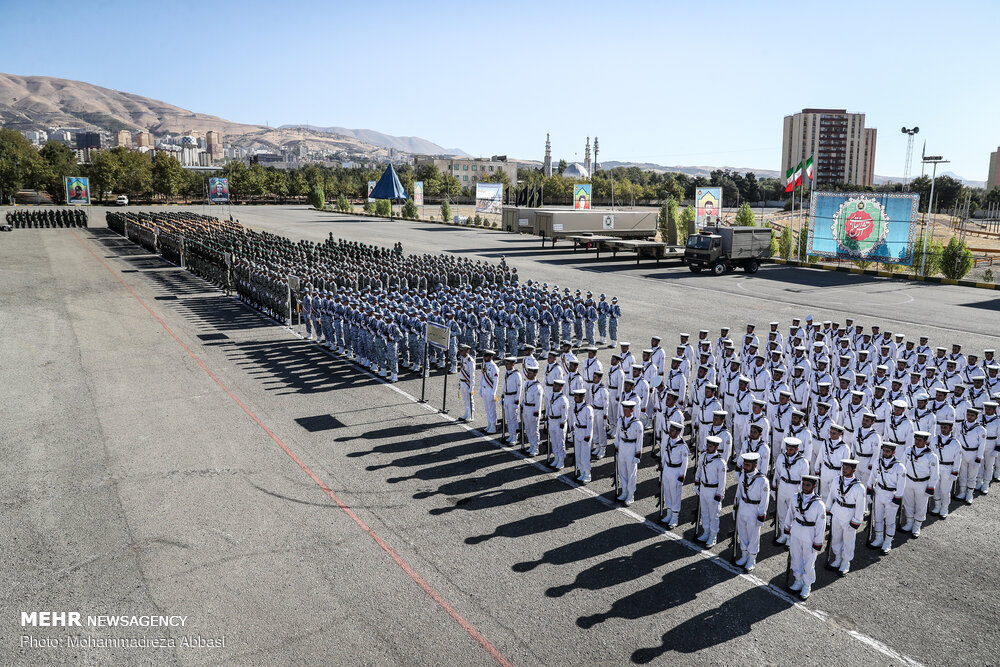
A 2019 joint morning call of Iranian Armed Forces

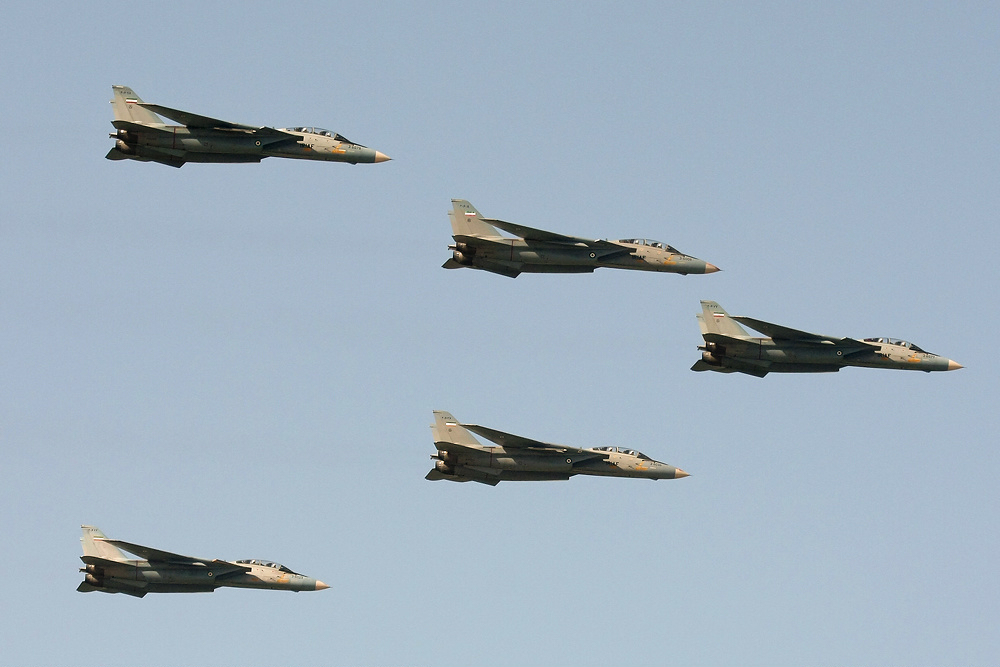
A formation flight of Iranian Grumman F-14 Tomcats, in 2008

The General Staff of the Islamic Republic of Iran Armed Forces manages both the IRGC and the Armed Forces on behalf of the Supreme Leader. The Khatam al-Anbiya Central Headquarters runs both forces' operations. Ebrahim Zolfaghari serves as the Khatam al-Anbiya Central Headquarters spokesman.

The Islamic Revolutionary Guard Corps, or Revolutionary Guards, has an estimated 190,000 personnel in four branches. It has Ground Forces; a Navy; an Aerospace Force, and an unconventional force, the Quds Force. The Basij is a paramilitary reserve force controlled by the Islamic Revolutionary Guards. Its numerical size is not agreed among authoritative sources. Since at least 2023 the IISS has said that the Basij has a claimed membership of 12.6 million, including women, of which perhaps 600,000 are combat capable. In 2019 the U.S. Defense Intelligence Agency estimated its active personnel at over 400,000.

The Iranian regular military, the "Artesh," consists of the Artesh Ground Forces, the Artesh Navy, the Artesh Air Force, and the Artesh Air Defense Force. In early 2026 the regular armed forces were estimated to have 420,000 personnel. The Artesh Ground Forces had 350,000, of which 220,000 were conscripts; the Artesh Navy had 18,000, the Artesh Air Force had 37,000 personnel; and the Artesh Air Defense Force had 15,000 personnel. These figures have remained unchanged since at least 2023 and may now be unreliable, especially due to the 2026 Iran war.

=== IRGC ballistic missile program ===
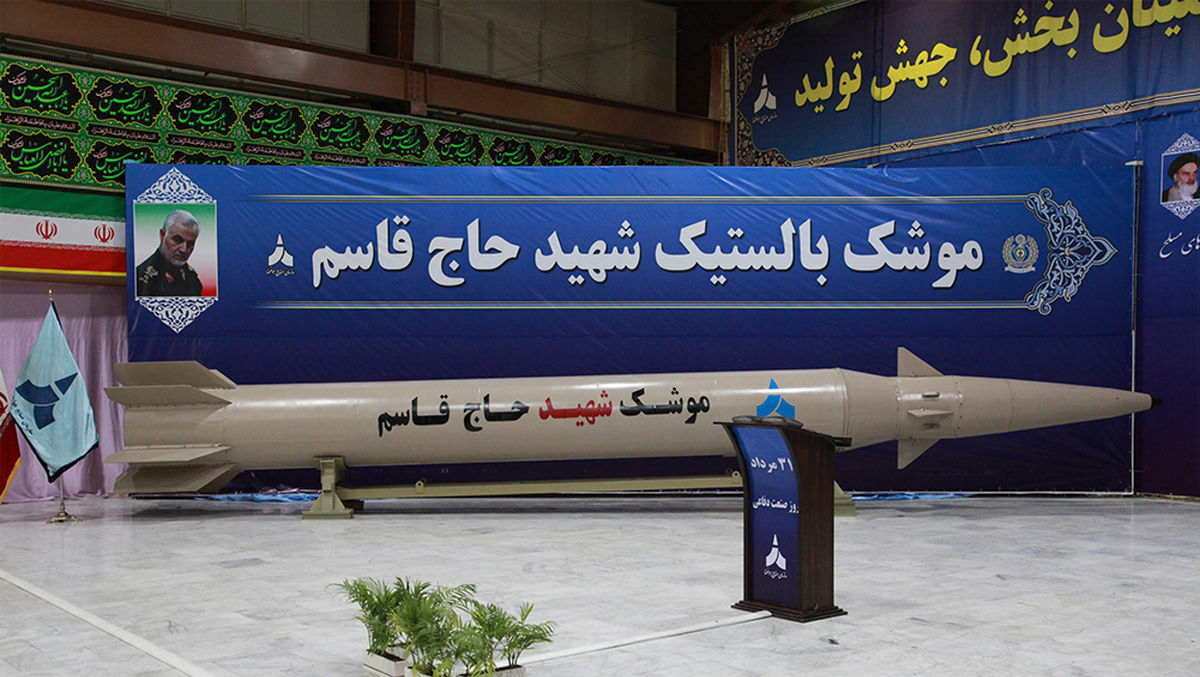
Unveiling of Haj Qassem missile, August 2020.

The Islamic Revolutionary Guard Corps Aerospace Force operates Iran's surface-to-surface missile forces.

Iran has started the development of an ICBM/IRBM missile project, known as Ghadr-110 with a range of 3000 km. Iran has also built large numbers of underground ballistic missile bases and silos. Older generation platforms, like the Shahab family, are slowly being phased out of service and replaced by newer generation ballistic missiles that emphasise accuracy and manoeuvrability over longer range, such as the Fateh and Sejjil families. In 2022, the former commander of U.S. Central Command, General Kenneth McKenzie, said that Iran's missile forces, by far the largest and most diverse in the Middle East, had achieved "effective overmatch" against their neighbours in the region.

== Budget ==
Iran's 2025 defense budget was estimated to be US$6.09 billion by International Institute for Strategic Studies, converted via the NIMA (an acronym for the Persian phrase "Integrated Forex Deals System") exchange rate.

View source data.
Iranian 21st century military spending in $ billion, constant prices of 2019 (via SIPRI Military Expenditure Database)

== Defense industry ==
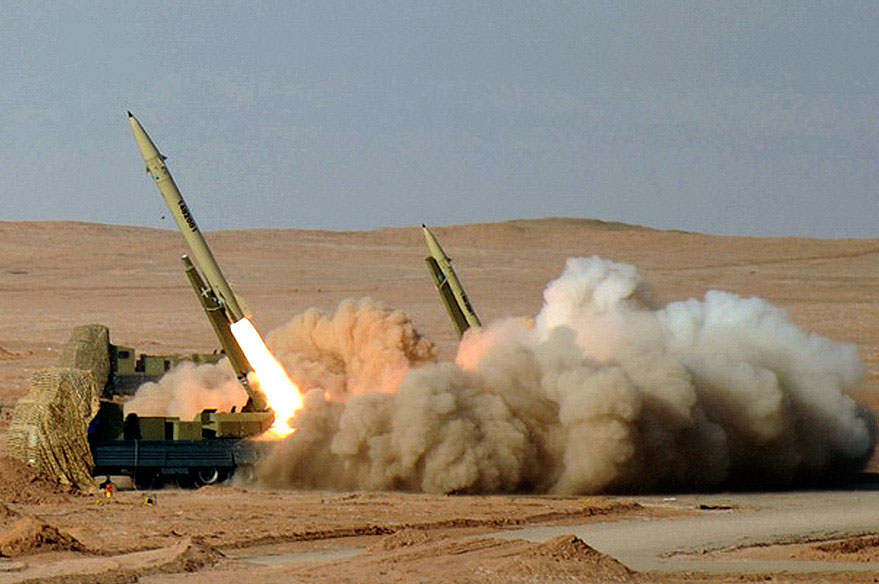
Fateh-110 is a solid-fuel, guided ballistic missile.

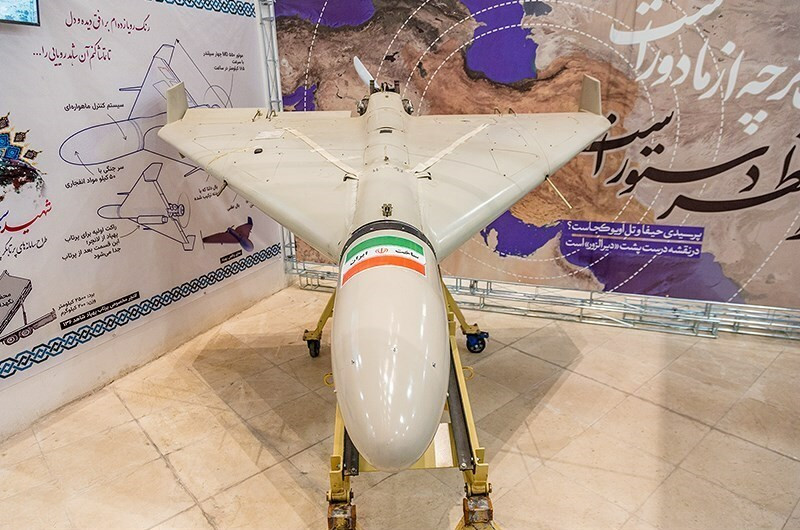
The Shahed 136 drone is widely considered to be one of the most capable Iranian drones in service

The Islamic Revolutionary Guards were put in charge of creating what is today known as the Iranian military industry. Under their command, Iran's military industry was enormously expanded, and with the Ministry of Defense pouring investment into the missile industry, Iran soon accumulated a vast arsenal of missiles. Since 1992, it has also produced its own tanks, armored personnel carriers, radar systems, guided missiles, marines, military vessels and fighter planes. Iran is also producing its own submarines.

In recent years, official announcements have highlighted the development of weapons such as the Fajr-3 (MIRV), Hoot, Kowsar, Fateh-110, Shahab-3 missile systems and a variety of unmanned aerial vehicles, at least one of which Israel claims has been used to spy on its territory.

On November 2, 2012, Iran's Brigadier General Hassan Seifi reported that the Iranian Army had achieved self-suffiency in producing military equipment, and that the abilities of Iranian scientists have enabled the country to make significant progress in this field. He was quoted saying, "Unlike Western countries which hide their new weapons and munitions from all, the Islamic Republic of Iran's Army is not afraid of displaying its latest military achievements and all countries must become aware of Iran's progress in producing weaponry."

In 2019 the U.S. Defense Intelligence Agency wrote that Iran exported military equipment to Russia; Iraq; China; Sudan; Ethiopia; Afghanistan; North Korea; Cuba; Nicaragua; Armenia; Venezuela, and Pakistan. In 2022 the Washington Post wrote that Iran had begun a new drone assembly production line in Tajikistan. Other reported Iranian export customers include Lebanon; Belarus; and Yemen.

Iran's Shahed drones have been used by Russian forces during the Russo-Ukrainian war and by Iranian forces during the 2026 Iran war. As a response to the effectiveness of the Shahed 136 drones, Ukraine developed its own Shahed-136 analogs in 2025 for long-range strikes. In December 2025, the U.S. military said that it had developed the LUCAS drone, a clone of the Shahed 136 developed from the reverse engineering of the Shahed 136, and deployed a squadron in the Middle East.

== See also ==
- List of Iranian two-star generals since 1979
- List of military equipment manufactured in Iran
- Equipment of the Iranian Army
- Current Iranian Navy vessels
- List of Iranian Air Force aircraft
