= Shahreza =

City in Isfahan province, Iran

Shahreza Persian: شهرضا
- City
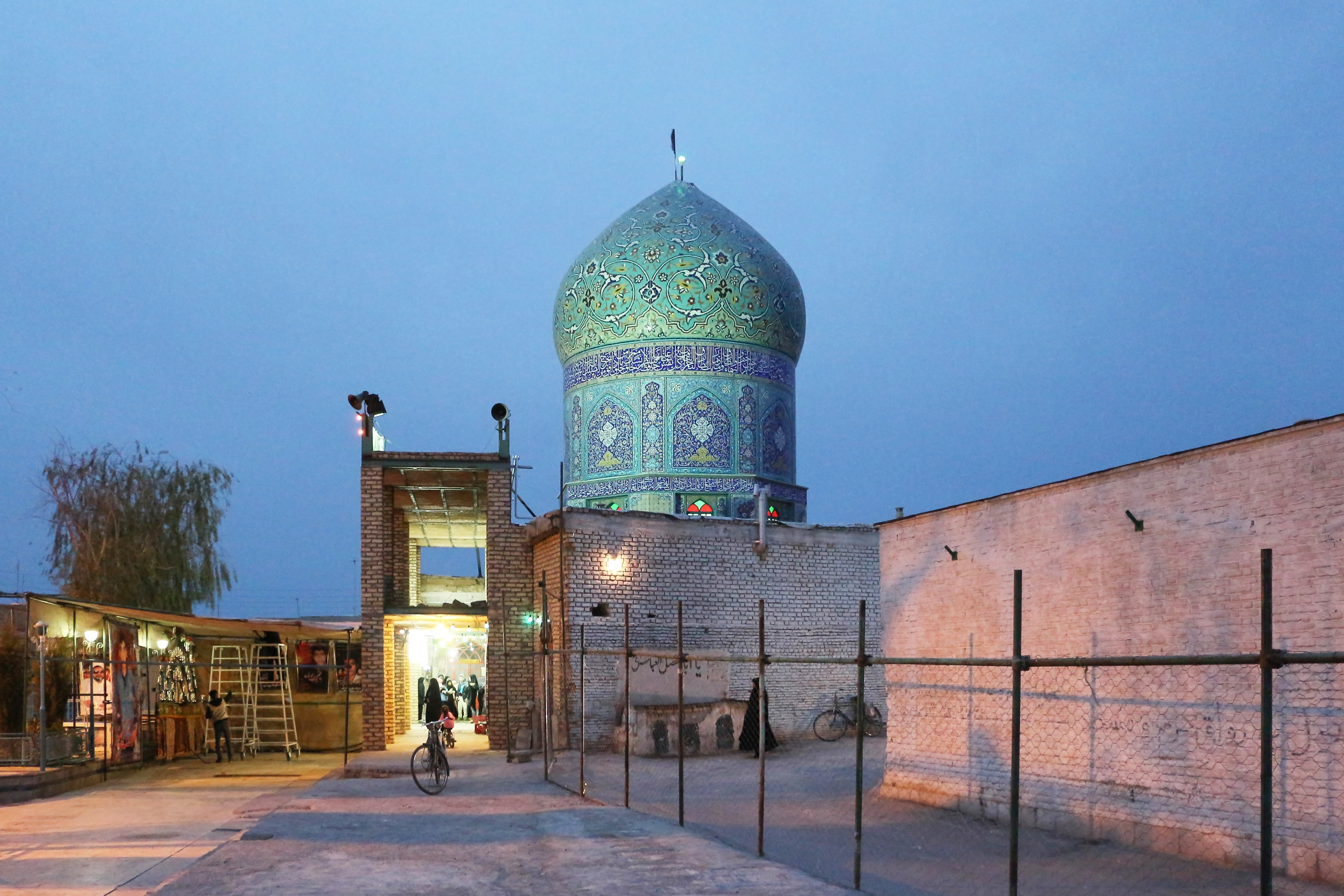
- Mausoleum of Bibi Khaton in Shahreza

- Location within Iran
- Coordinates: 32°00′44″N 51°51′34″E
- Country: Iran
- Province: Isfahan
- County: Shahreza
- District: Central

Population (2016)
  - Total: 134,952
- Time zone: UTC+3:30 (IRST)

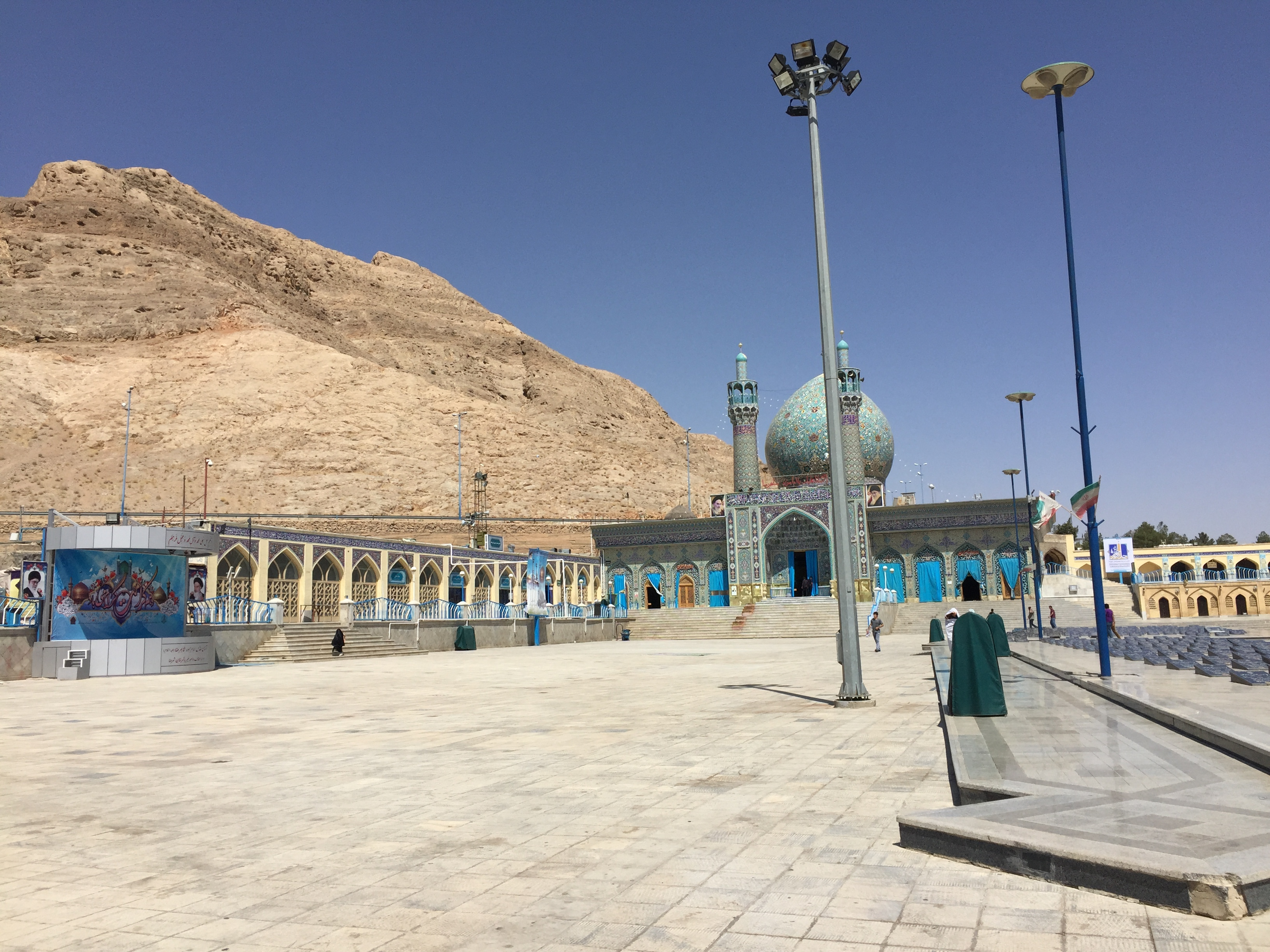
Shahreza Imamzadeh

Shahreza (Persian: شهرضا) (Note: Also romanized as Shahrezā; also known as Shahriza; formerly Komsheh, then Qomsheh (قمشه); also known as Kowmsheh and Qowmsheh) is a city in the Central District of Shahreza County, (Note: Formerly Qomsheh County) Isfahan province, Iran, serving as capital of both the county and the district. Shahreza was selected as the "National City of Pottery" in 1997. The reason for this choice was the high skill of the artists and the unique soil of this city.

== History ==
It was one of the ancient territories of northern Pars (Persia) Satrapy in B.C.

In the north of the county there is canyon of Orchiny (Orchine) that the main Iranian north-south high way passes through. The huge castle of Qomsheh was the latest place constructed by the Safavid Empire before the occupation of the capital Isfahan in the last of Safavid ages when Afghans captured and destroyed it in 1722.

== Demographics ==
=== Population ===
At the time of the 2006 National Census, the city's population was 108,299 in 30,368 households. The following census in 2011 counted 123,767 people in 37,113 households. The 2016 census measured the population of the city as 134,952 people in 43,478 households.

== Overview ==
Shahreza is located 508 km south to Tehran and about 80 km south west to Isfahan and Zard Kooh mountain chain runs from north-west to south-east of the city, enjoying a cold climate. It is an old city which was first named Qomsheh, but later on its name was changed to Shahreza due to the existence there of the shrine of Shahreza. The most important tourist attractions are: Mahyar caravanserai, Shahreza caravanserai, the Shah Ghandab caves, located south-east of Shahreza, the Poodeh mosque, and Shahreza Imamzadeh. Other tourist attractions include the Amin Abad caravanserai, a Safavid Empire structure in Amin Abad, a village 42 km south of Shahreza.

Shahreza is a strategic city due to having large military bases, a rail transportation system, very fertile soil, having the second largest industrial town in Iran (Razi), and connecting the north to the south.

It is interesting that a part of the old Silk Road passed through the Choghad Shahreza area.

== Climate ==
Shahreza has a cold desert climate (BWk) according to the Köppen climate classification.

Climate data for Shahreza (1993-2010)
Month	Jan	Feb	Mar	Apr	May	Jun	Jul	Aug	Sep	Oct	Nov	Dec	Year
Mean daily maximum °C (°F)	8.6 (47.5)	12.0 (53.6)	16.1 (61.0)	21.4 (70.5)	27.0 (80.6)	32.7 (90.9)	35.2 (95.4)	33.9 (93.0)	30.2 (86.4)	23.8 (74.8)	16.0 (60.8)	10.9 (51.6)	22.3 (72.2)
Daily mean °C (°F)	2.5 (36.5)	5.5 (41.9)	9.3 (48.7)	14.5 (58.1)	19.2 (66.6)	23.9 (75.0)	26.9 (80.4)	25.0 (77.0)	20.9 (69.6)	15.1 (59.2)	8.7 (47.7)	4.4 (39.9)	14.7 (58.4)
Mean daily minimum °C (°F)	−3.6 (25.5)	−1.0 (30.2)	2.5 (36.5)	7.5 (45.5)	11.4 (52.5)	15.2 (59.4)	18.6 (65.5)	16.1 (61.0)	11.6 (52.9)	6.5 (43.7)	1.5 (34.7)	−2.1 (28.2)	7.0 (44.6)
Average precipitation mm (inches)	25.6 (1.01)	19.0 (0.75)	26.8 (1.06)	17.2 (0.68)	6.2 (0.24)	2.2 (0.09)	0.4 (0.02)	0.4 (0.02)	0.0 (0.0)	2.8 (0.11)	15.6 (0.61)	26.0 (1.02)	142.2 (5.61)
Average precipitation days (≥ 1.0 mm)	3.8	2.7	3.3	3.4	1.5	0.4	0.2	0.1	0	0.7	2.2	3.7	22
Average snowy days	3.6	0.9	0.4	0	0	0	0	0	0	0	0.2	1.9	7
Average relative humidity (%)	57	47	41	37	31	24	23	22	24	33	47	57	37
Average dew point °C (°F)	−5.6 (21.9)	−6.0 (21.2)	−4.1 (24.6)	−0.8 (30.6)	0.9 (33.6)	2.0 (35.6)	4.0 (39.2)	2.0 (35.6)	−0.4 (31.3)	−1.5 (29.3)	−2.9 (26.8)	−4.1 (24.6)	−1.4 (29.5)
Source: IRIMO (temperatures), (dew point 1993-2005), (humidity), (precipitation and snow)

=== Souvenirs and handicrafts ===
Shahreza is known for its unique souvenirs and handicrafts. Among the most popular items are pomegranates, raisins, dairy products such as yogurt and shallot, kashk (fermented whey), and qara (a local dried yogurt). Shahreza's pottery is especially famous throughout Iran, and the city is also known for its ceramics and handwoven carpets.

=== Cuisine ===
Shahreza has a rich culinary heritage, with local dishes like koofteh berenji or koofteh chi (a rice meatball made with rice, meat, fava beans, and herbs) and ash-e omaj (a thick soup) being popular among locals. Another beloved traditional food is mas poost, a type of thick yogurt similar to strained yogurt but with a unique and delicious taste. Additionally, samanoo, a nutritious and traditional dish, is often made as a religious offering.

=== Tourist attractions ===
Among the main attractions of Shahreza is the Shahreza Imamzadeh, a shrine believed to be the resting place of the brother of Imam Reza. Due to the presence of ceramic shops and several parks around it, this site serves as a major tourist destination and is highly revered by the local population.

The Jameh Mosque of Shahreza, located at the start of the historical covered bazaar, is another attraction. Built during the Seljuk era in 739 AH (1338 CE), the mosque boasts a large prayer hall, a beautifully painted mihrab, a stone pulpit, and a high dome and minaret.
