= Islamic Republic of Iran Army =

Iranian armed forces

- ارتش جمهوری اسلامی ایران
- Seal of the Islamic Republic of Iran Army

- Flags of the Islamic Republic of Iran Army
- Motto: Persian: ارتش فدای ملت "Army Sacrificed for the Nation" (unofficial); Persian: خدا، شاه، ميهن "God, Shah, Motherland" (pre-1979); Arabic: وَإِنَّ جُنْدنَا لَهُمْ الْغَالِبُونَ "And Our Soldiers, They Verily Would Be the Victors." ^{[Quran 37:173]} (Heraldry slogan)
- Founded: 1921 (Imperial State of Iran)
- Current form: 1979; 47 years ago (Islamic Republic of Iran)
- Service branches: Ground Forces; Air Force; Navy; Air Defense Force
- Headquarters: Khatam al-Anbiya Central Headquarters, Tehran
- Website: aja.ir

Leadership
- Commander-in-Chief: Maj. Gen. Amir Hatami
- Deputy Commander-in-Chief: Brig. Gen. Mohammad-Hossein Dadras

Personnel
- Military age: 18
- Conscription: 21 months
- Active personnel: 630,000: 550,000 (Ground Force); 35,000 (Air Force); 25,000 (Navy); 20,000 (Air Defense)

Expenditure
- Budget: $6 billion (2024)

Related articles
- History: Military history of Iran; History of the Iranian Air Force; History of the Iranian Navy
- Ranks: Military ranks of Iran

The Islamic Republic of Iran Army, (Note: (Persian: ارتش جمهوری اسلامی ایران, romanized: Arteš Jumhuriye-e Eslâmi-e Irân, abbr. AJA)) commonly known as Artesh, is the conventional military force of Iran and one of Iran's two military forces, the other being the Islamic Revolutionary Guard Corps (IRGC). It is tasked to protect the territorial integrity of the country from external and internal threats and to project power. It consists of four service branches: the Ground Forces, Air Force, Navy and Air Defense Force.

Both the Artesh and the IRGC provide essential security functions for Iran and coordinate regularly. But fierce rivalry exists, resulting from their uneven access to resources, varying levels of influence with the regime, and inherent overlap in missions and responsibilities.

== History ==
=== 20th century ===
The Iranian Army has been actively engaged in quelling tribal and separatist rebellions beginning in the 1940s. The 1941 invasion by the Allies of World War II resulted in a decisive loss for the Iranian forces, the deposition of Iran's Shah and five years of subsequent occupation. By 1947–48, the wartime U.S. Army Mission was reorganised as a Military Assistance Advisory Group on a permanent basis.

A U.S. Director of Central Intelligence approved estimate wrote in December 1954:

Of the $110 million in [military equipment aid since 1950] allocated thus far, about $76 million had been shipped by mid-1954. The mission to the army is to be augmented by five U.S. training teams at brigade or division level in early 1955. The Iranian armed forces consist of a conscript army of 120,000; a gendarmerie or rural police force of 20,000; and a small air force, navy, and frontier guard, the latter for border patrol and customs duties. The Air Force, Navy, and Frontier Guard are subordinate units of the Army. The Gendarmerie is under the control of the Ministry of the Interior, except in time of war, when it comes under army command.

After the coup in 1953, Iran began purchasing some weapons from Israel, the United States, and other countries of the Western Bloc. Later on, Iran began establishing its own armaments industry; its efforts in this remained largely unrecognized internationally, until recently.

From the 1970s, the Imperial Iranian Armed Forces sent detachments to help the Red Lion and Sun society in rescue and relief missions after domestic natural disasters, including clearing roads, reestablishing communications, supplying goods, airlifting equipment, transporting casualties and personnel and setting up field hospitals and post-hospital care centres. More recently, under the mullahs, military personnel helped disaster recovery efforts and the Iranian Red Crescent Society after the Bam earthquake.

Following the Iranian revolution in 1979, deteriorating relations with the US resulted in international sanctions led by the US, including an arms embargo being imposed on Iran.

Revolutionary Iran was taken by surprise by the 1980 Iraqi invasion began the Iran–Iraq War, which lasted almost eight years and ended in almost unchanged frontiers (status quo ante bellum).

During this war, there were also several conflicts with the United States. From 1987, the United States Central Command sought to stop Iranian mine-laying vessels from blocking the international sea lanes through the Persian Gulf in Operation Prime Chance. The operation lasted until 1989. On April 18, 1988, the US retaliated for the Iranian mining of the USS Samuel B. Roberts in Operation Praying Mantis. Simultaneously, the Iranian armed forces had to learn to maintain and keep operational, their large stocks of US-built equipment and weaponry, without outside help, due to the American-led sanctions. However, Iran was able to obtain limited amounts of American-made armaments, when it was able to buy American spare parts and weaponry for its armed forces, during the Iran–Contra affair. At first, deliveries came via Israel and later, from the US.

The Iranian government established a five-year rearmament program in 1989 to replace worn-out weaponry from the Iran–Iraq War. Between 1989 and 1992, Iran spent $10 billion on arms, some of which were designed to prevent other states' naval vessels from accessing the sea, including marines and long-range Soviet planes capable of attacking aircraft carriers.

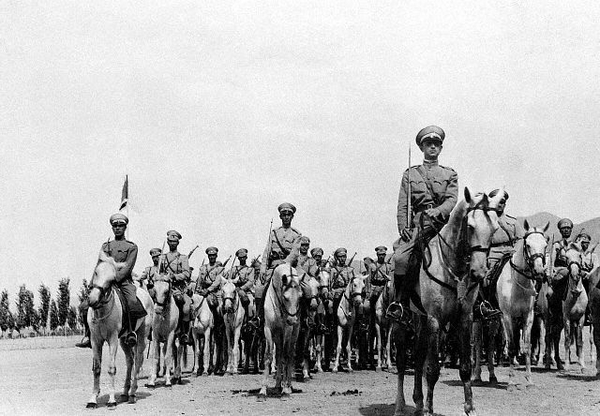
Iranian cavalry in 1930

A former military-associated police force, the Iranian Gendarmerie, was merged with the National Police (Shahrbani) and Islamic Revolution Committees in 1990.

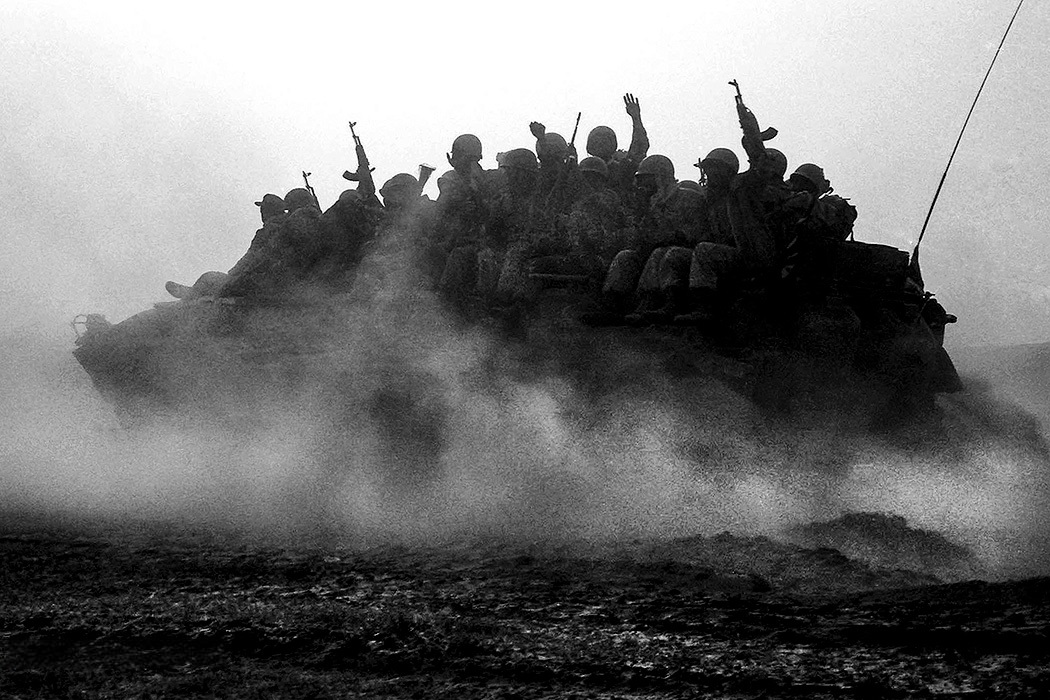
Iranian soldiers during Iran-Iraq war, 1980s

In 1991, the Iranian armed forces received a number of Iraqi military aircraft being evacuated from the Persian Gulf War of that year; most of which were incorporated into the Islamic Republic of Iran Air Force.

From 1921 to 1998, "Chairman of Chief of Staff" (Persian: رئیس ستاد مشترک ارتش) was the highest-ranking position within the Artesh, however after the newly established office "Commander-in-Chief of Artesh" (Persian: فرمانده کل ارتش) position was founded in 1998, the former position was deposed as a decision-making position and became the coordinator deputy of the Chief Commander (Persian: معاونت هماهنگ‌کننده ارتش). The position is currently held by Rear Admiral Habibollah Sayyari, who is second-in-command and deputy of Major general Abdolrahim Mousavi.

The Iranian Navy has launched several missions to fight piracy off the coast of Somalia. One of the reported missions took place in 2016.

In 2021, the Artesh announced that it would launch a satellite into space.

== Missions and deployments ==
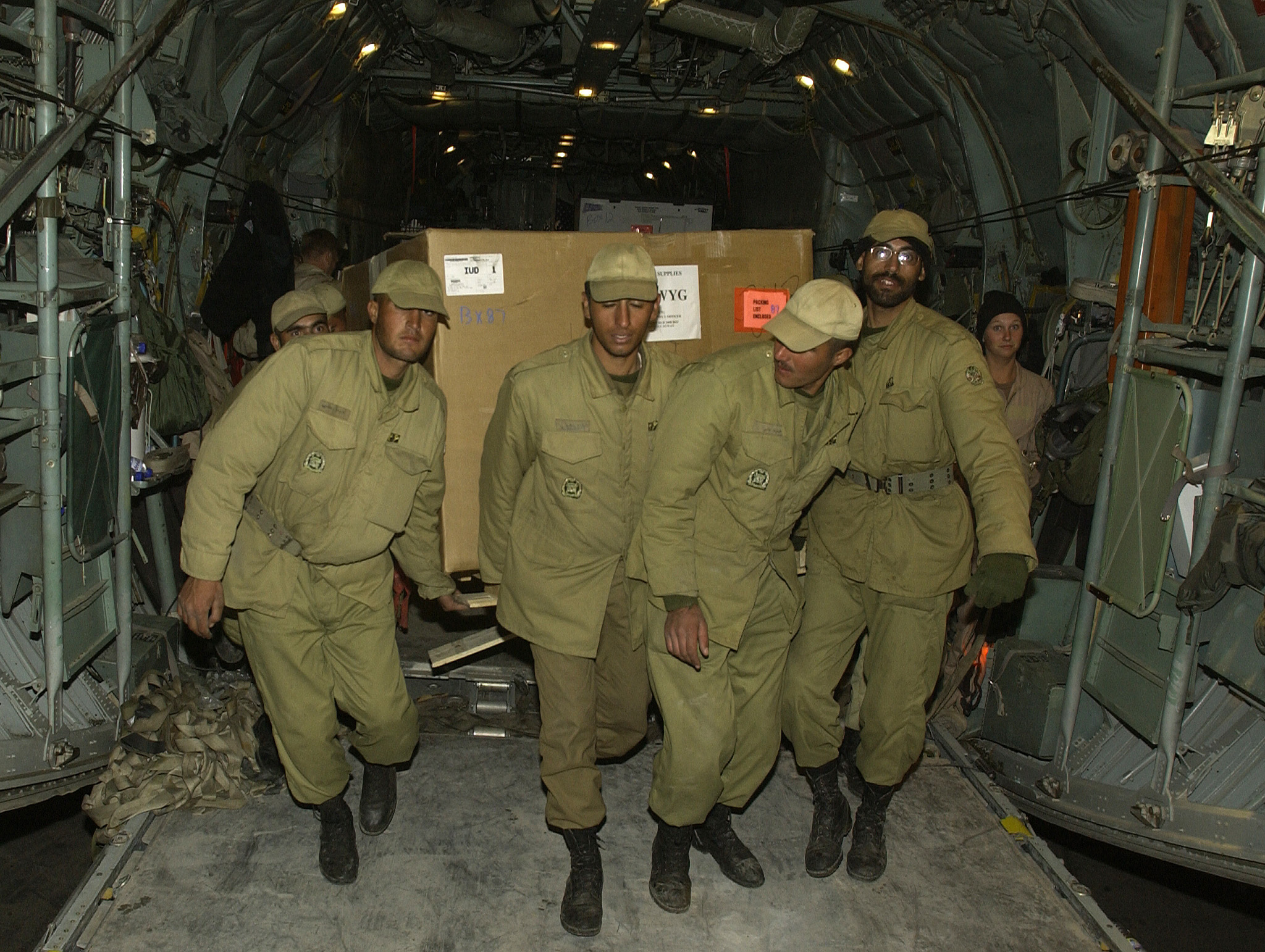
Ground Force soldiers carrying off medical supplies for 2003 Bam earthquake

From 1972 to 1976, Iranian troops were sent to Oman to fight with the Royal Army of Oman against the Dhofar Rebellion. In 1976, a contingent was sent to Pakistan to assist the Pakistan Army against the insurgency in Balochistan. Iranian personnel were also reportedly present in the Vietnam War.

In 2016, the special forces were deployed to fight in the Syrian civil war.

=== International peacekeeping missions ===
The Iranian Army participated in United Nations peacekeeping missions in the 1970s. It sent a battalion to replace Peruvian forces in the Golan Heights as part of the United Nations Disengagement Observer Force. After the Israeli invasion of Lebanon, the bulk of the forces were part of the United Nations Interim Force in Lebanon until late 1978. Replaced by Finnish forces, Iranian peacekeepers were withdrawn in 1979 following the Islamic revolution.

In 1993, the Iranian Army reestablished its professional peacekeeping units and declared that they are ready to be dispatched at the UN's directive. Since then, Iran has deployed forces in Ethiopia and Eritrea in 2003 and the African Union Mission in Darfur in 2012.

== Structure ==
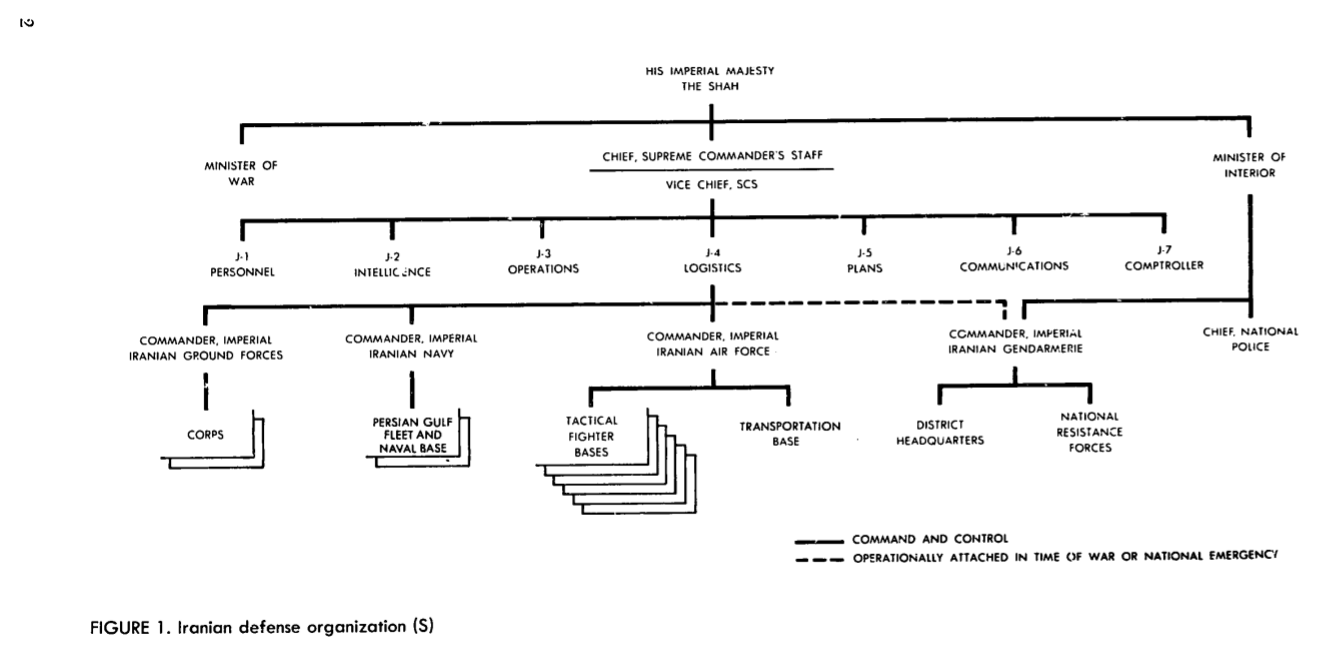
Organisation of the Imperial Iranian Armed Forces, 1973

The Joint Staff of the Armed Forces (Farsi acronym SEMAJA (Persian: سماجا) coordinates the four branches: the Islamic Republic of Iran Ground Forces, the Air Force, Navy, and Air Defence Force. The current chief of staff is Rear Admiral Habibollah Sayyari. The Joint Staff has the Central Provost and University of Command and Staff under control.

Military academies include the AJA University of Command and Staff; the AJA University of Medical Sciences; the Imam Ali Officers' Academy; the Shahid Sattari Aeronautical University; the Khatam al-Anbia Air Defense Academy; and the Imam Khomeini Naval University of Noshahr.

=== Institutional relationship with the IRGC ===
Iran's dual military structure creates an institutional division between the Artesh and the Islamic Revolutionary Guard Corps (IRGC), resulting in competition over resource allocation and influence within the Islamic Republic. Under Articles 143 and 150 of the Constitution of Iran, the Artesh is responsible for defending the country's independence and territorial integrity, while the IRGC is charged with safeguarding the Islamic Revolution and its achievements. This constitutional division has been reflected in budgetary priorities, with the smaller IRGC receiving greater funding and exercising broader political and economic influence through its affiliated institutions and business interests.

The Artesh is also subject to a greater degree of civilian oversight and ideological supervision than the IRGC. Differences in funding and institutional influence have been associated with supply shortages and operational constraints within the regular armed forces. According to reports published in 2026, these shortages contributed to increased tensions between the two organizations, with claims that some Artesh units experienced shortages of ammunition, food, drinking water, and medical support.

== Equipment ==
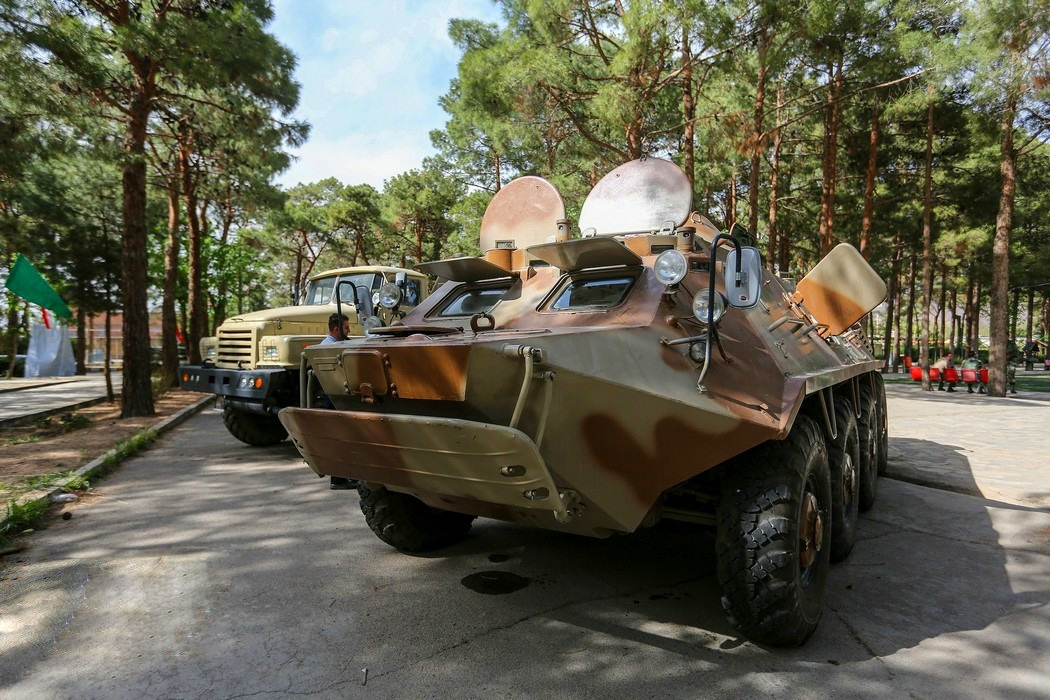
Armed Forces Day exhibition in Isfahan

Under the last Shah of Iran, Mohammad Reza Pahlavi, Iran's military industry was limited to assembly of foreign weapons. In the assembly lines that were put up by American firms, such as Bell, Litton and Northrop, Iranian workers put together a variety of helicopters, aircraft, guided missiles, electronic components and tanks. In 1973, Iran Electronics Industries was established. The company was set up to organise and carry out the assembly and repair of foreign-delivered weapons. The Iranian Defense Industries Organization was the first to succeed in taking a step into what could be called a military industry by reverse engineering Soviet RPG-7, BM-21, and SAM-7 missiles in 1979.

Nevertheless, most of Iran's weapons before the Islamic revolution were imported from the United States and Europe. Between 1971 and 1975, the Shah went on a buying spree, ordering $8 billion in weapons from the United States alone. This alarmed the United States Congress, which strengthened a 1968 law on arms exports in 1976 and renamed it the Arms Export Control Act. Still, the United States continued to sell large amounts of weapons to Iran until the 1979 Islamic Revolution.

After the Islamic revolution, Iran found itself severely isolated and lacking technological expertise. Because of economic sanctions and a weapons embargo put on Iran by the United States, it was forced to rely on its domestic arms industry for weapons and spare parts, since there were very few countries willing to do business with Iran.

Iranian fighting vehicles
Model	Image	Origin	Quantity	Notes
Tanks
T-54A		USSR	Unknown	
T-55A		USSR	Unknown	
Type 69		China	Unknown	Captured from Iraq.
Safir-74		Iran	Unknown	
Chonma-ho		North Korea	Unknown	
T-72M		USSR	Unknown	Captured from Iraq, some with an upgraded fire-control system.
T-72M1		USSR	Unknown	Some with an upgraded fire-control system.
T-72S		Russia	Unknown	Some with electro-optical active protection system or slat armour.
FV 101 Scorpion		United Kingdom	Unknown	Locally upgraded examples known as Tosan.
FV4201 Chieftain		United Kingdom	Unknown	Locally upgraded examples known as Mobarez, Some with a Russian V-84 engine.
M47M		United States	Unknown	Some upgraded with an EO device and explosive reactive armour.
M48A5		United States	Unknown	
M60A1 Patton		United States	Unknown	
Karrar		Iran	Unknown	
Armoured fighting vehicles
EE-9		Brazil	Unknown	Captured from Iraq.
Lynx		United States	Unknown	Some armed with ZU-23s.
Infantry fighting vehicles
BMP-1		USSR	Unknown	
BMP-2		USSR	Unknown	Some upgraded to carry Dehlavieh anti-tank guided missiles.
BTR-82		Iran	Unknown	
Armoured personnel carriers
BTR-50PK		USSR	Unknown	
BTR-60PB		USSR	Unknown	
M113		United States	Unknown	
Boragh		Iran	Unknown	Can be armed with multiple rocket launchers and ZU-23s.
Rakhsh		Iran	Unknown	Can be armed with ZU-23s.
Mine resistant ambush protected vehicles
Toofan		Iran	Unknown	
Ra'ad		Iran	Unknown	Yet to enter mass production.
Caracal		Iran	Unknown	Yet to enter mass production.
Infantry mobility vehicles
M1151		United States	Unknown	Taken over from Afghan National Army elements that escaped to Iran.
YOZ 102		Iran	Unknown	
Jasour		Iran	Unknown	
Fateq		Iran	Unknown	Can be armed with recoilless rifles.
Roueintan		Iran	Unknown	Yet to enter mass production.
Early Rakhsh		Iran	Unknown	Can be armed with ZU-23s.
Late Rakhsh		Iran	Unknown	
Kia		Iran	Unknown	

== Symbols and uniforms ==
Branch	Insignia	Flag	Uniform colors and patterns		
Branch	Insignia	Flag	Service	Combat	Specialized
Ground Force					
Air Defence Force					
Air Force					
Navy					

== See also ==
- Rank insignia of the Iranian military
- Military history of Iran
- Ebrahim Zolfaghari
