= Shahid Sattari Aeronautical University =

Military academy in Iran

The Air Academy
- دانشگاه علوم و فنون هوایی شهید ستاری; Danushgah-e 'lum-e vâ Fenvân-e Hevâii-ye Shihid Sitari
- Type: Military academy, university
- Established: 1988
- Chancellor: 2nd Brigadier General Mohammad Reza Marvinam
- Location: Tehran, Iran; 35.673°N 51.333°E
- Affiliations: Islamic Republic of Iran Air Force

The Shahid Sattari University of Aeronautical Engineering or Air Academy, is Islamic Republic of Iran Air Force's military academy. Its main departments are a flight school, an aeronautic engineering faculty, an electronic engineering department as well as computing and administrative faculties. The formative period may last for 2 or 4 years.

== Establishment ==
It was established in 1988 by the IRIAF general Mansour Sattari in Tehran, Iran, due to the necessity of providing a trained and capable manpower to the IRIAF.

== Focus subjects ==
It trains its students in a numerous variety of subjects and roles related to the air force, such as fighter pilots, UCAV operators, flight & support engineers, Aerospace Engineering, radar control, electronics & missile development and space engineering.

== Training ==
Cadets of the academy achieve the second Lieutenant rank upon graduation and join the IRIAF. After that, graduates can take further courses, focusing in their main specialty. Despite being primarily a military academy for the air force members, the university also trains non-military students in a different variety of fields including electrical, mechanical, and aerospace engineering. Alongside the Israeli Air Force Flight Academy, it is considered one of the best air academies in the region by academic and military standards.

== Faculties and fields of study ==
The IRIAF Air Academy does have faculties which train the students in their related fields:

1. Faculty of Aerospace Engineering: In this faculty students of Aerospace Engineering and Maintenance Engineering are trained, the students of Aerospace Engineering are often chosen from the best of their year-entry, also the number of Aerospace Engineering students which are chosen is low, making a competitive field for the students. The second field is the Maintenance Engineering, the number of students of this field is almost the highest in each year-entry due to the numerous professions of their field.
2. Faculty of Electrical Engineering: In this faculty the situation is different, due to the strictness of their fields, students are often engaged in variety of hard yet long courses, Electrical Engineering and Communications Engineering are provided in this faculty where the Communications Engineering is considered the hardest field in the academy by having the majority number of academic probations is belonged to this field which most of them are later expelled, also the faculty insists its students on reading and understanding in English by purchasing original language (mostly English) books for them, yet it also provided them with Persian books too.
3. Faculty of Computer Engineering: The faculty of computer engineering provide Computer engineer officers for all of the branches of the Islamic Republic of Iran Army, due to this, there is a variety of students which belong to IRIAF, IRIADF, IRIN, and IRIGF in this faculty, there are 2 main fields provided here, Computer Engineering (Software Engineering) and Cyber Engineering (with three branches inside; Cyber Defence Engineering, Cyber Security Engineering and Cyber Operations Engineering)
4. Faculty of Flight: The most important faculty of the Air Academy is the FoF (Faculty of Flight), in this faculty the pilots are trained among with the Air Traffic Controllers, the conditions of acceptance in this faculty to become pilots are the hardest thus very few can and are allowed to become pilots.
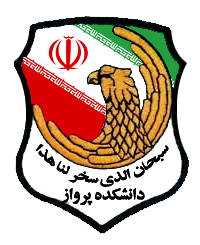
  Insignia of the Faculty of Flight
