= Central District (Shahreza County) =

District in Isfahan province, Iran

Central District (Shahreza County) Persian: بخش مرکزی شهرستان شهرضا
- District
- Location within Iran
- Coordinates: 31°52′N 51°54′E
- Country: Iran
- Province: Isfahan
- County: Shahreza
- Capital: Shahreza

Population (2016)
  - Total: 159,792
- Time zone: UTC+3:30 (IRST)

The Central District of Shahreza County (Note: Formerly Qomsheh County) (Persian: بخش مرکزی شهرستان شهرضا) is in Isfahan province, Iran. Its capital is the city of Shahreza.

== Demographics ==
=== Population ===
At the time of the 2006 National Census, the district's population was 139,702 in 38,929 households. The following census in 2011 counted 149,532 people in 44,610 households. The 2016 census measured the population of the district as 159,792 inhabitants in 50,982 households.

=== Administrative divisions ===
Central District (Shahreza County) Population
Administrative Divisions	2006	2011	2016
Dasht RD	4,853	3,069	2,175
Esfarjan RD	6,760	6,290	5,364
Kahruiyeh RD	2,530	2,183	1,843
Manzariyeh RD	11,643	7,953	8,294
Manzariyeh (city)	5,617	6,270	7,164
Shahreza (city)	108,299	123,767	134,952
Total	139,702	149,532	159,792
RD = Rural District
