= Shahreza County =

County in Isfahan province, Iran

Shahreza County Persian: شهرستان شهرضا
- County
- Location of Shahreza County in Isfahan province (bottom, yellow)

- Location of Isfahan province in Iran
- Coordinates: 31°52′N 51°54′E
- Country: Iran
- Province: Isfahan
- Capital: Shahreza
- Districts: Central

Government
  - Governor: Sayyed Amir Jafari

Population (2016)
  - Total: 159,797
- Time zone: UTC+3:30 (IRST)

Shahreza County (Persian: شهرستان شهرضا) (Note: Formerly Qomsheh County (شهرستان قمشه)) is in Isfahan province, Iran. Its capital is the city of Shahreza.

== Demographics ==
=== Population ===
At the time of the 2006 National Census, the county's population was 139,702 in 38,929 households. The following census in 2011 counted 149,555 people in 44,578 households. The 2016 census measured the population of the county as 159,797 in 50,983 households.

=== Administrative divisions ===
Shahreza County's population history and administrative structure over three consecutive censuses are shown in the following table.

Shahreza County Population
Administrative Divisions	2006	2011	2016
Central District	139,702	149,532	159,792
Dasht RD	4,853	3,069	2,175
Esfarjan RD	6,760	6,290	5,364
Kahruiyeh RD	2,530	2,183	1,843
Manzariyeh RD	11,643	7,953	8,294
Manzariyeh (city)	5,617	6,270	7,164
Shahreza (city)	108,299	123,767	134,952
Total	139,702	149,555	159,797
RD = Rural District

== See also ==
Media related to Shahreza County at Wikimedia Commons
