= List of Iranian aerial victories during the Iran–Iraq war =

The list includes victories by Islamic Republic of Iran Air Force during the Iran–Iraq War.

== List of confirmed victories ==
Date	Unit	Aircraft	Pilot	Weapon	Victim	Ref
7 September 1980	81 TFS/TFB 8	F-14A Tomcat	Unknown (Note: Name of the pilot is withheld.)	20 mm	Mi-25, 4 ATTSOS	
10 September 1980	TFB 8	F-14A Tomcat	Unknown	AIM-9P	MiG-21R	
13 September 1980	81 TFS/TFB 8	F-14A Tomcat	M.R. Attaei	AIM-54A	MiG-23MS	
23 September 1980	81 TFS/TFB 8	F-14A Tomcat	A. Azimi	AIM-54A	MiG-21	
23 September 1980	81 TFS/TFB 8	F-14A Tomcat	Unknown	AIM-7E4	MiG-23	
23 September 1980	81 TFS/TFB 8	F-14A Tomcat	Unknown	AIM-7E4	MiG-23	
23 September 1980	81 TFS/TFB 8	F-14A Tomcat	Unknown	AIM-9J	MiG-21	
24 September 1980	81 TFS/TFB 8	F-14A Tomcat	Unknown (Note: Attributed to a pilot identified as N.K.)	AIM-7E4	MiG-21MF	
24 September 1980	81 TFS/TFB 8	F-14A Tomcat	Unknown	AIM-9P	MiG-21MF	
24 September 1980	81 TFS/TFB 8	F-14A Tomcat	Unknown	AIM-54A	MiG-21MF	
25 September 1980	TFB 8	F-14A Tomcat	Unknown	AIM-54A	MiG-21	
25 September 1980	TFB 8	F-14A Tomcat	Unknown	AIM-9P	MiG-21	
25 September 1980	TFB 8	F-14A Tomcat	Unknown	AIM-9P	MiG-21	
25 September 1980	72 TFS/TFB 7	F-14A Tomcat	S. Naghdi	AIM-54A	MiG-23BN	
25 September 1980	TFB 8	F-14A Tomcat	Unknown	AAM	MiG-23BN	
2 October 1980	TFB 8	F-14A Tomcat	Unknown	AIM-9P	Su-20	
3 October 1980	TFB 8	F-14A Tomcat	Unknown	AAM	MiG-23	
5 October 1980	TFB 8	F-14A Tomcat	Unknown	Unknown	Su-20	
5 October 1980	TFB 8	F-14A Tomcat	Unknown	Unknown	Su-20	
5 October 1980	TFB 8	F-14A Tomcat	Unknown	Unknown	MiG-23	
10 October 1980	TFB 8	F-14A Tomcat	Unknown	Unknown	MiG-23BN	
10 October 1980	TFB 8	F-14A Tomcat	Unknown	Unknown	MiG-23BN	
10 October 1980	TFB 8	F-14A Tomcat	Unknown	Unknown	MiG-23BN	
13 October 1980	TFB 8	F-14A Tomcat	Afshar	AAM	MiG-23BN	
15 October 1980	TFB 8	F-14A Tomcat	Unknown	AIM-7E4	Su-20	
18 October 1980	81 TFS/TFB 8	F-14A Tomcat	G. Malej	AIM-9P	MiG-23	
18 October 1980	81 TFS/TFB 8	F-14A Tomcat	G. Malej	AIM-9P	MiG-23	
20 October 1980	81 TFS/TFB 8	F-14A Tomcat	H. Al-e-Agha	AIM-7E4	MiG-21MF	
22 October 1980	81 TFS/TFB 8	F-14A Tomcat	K. Sedghi	AIM-9P	MiG-23ML	
22 October 1980	81 TFS/TFB 8	F-14A Tomcat	Unknown	AIM-9	MiG-23BN	
25 October 1980	81 TFS/TFB 8	F-14A Tomcat	Unknown	AIM-9P	Su-20	
26 October 1980	81 TFS/TFB 8	F-14A Tomcat	A. Hazin	AIM-9P	MiG-21MF	
26 October 1980	81 TFS/TFB 8	F-14A Tomcat	K. Akhbari	AIM-9P	MiG-21MF	
29 October 1980	81 TFS/TFB 8	F-14A Tomcat	K. Sedghi	AIM-54A	MiG-23ML	
29 October 1980	81 TFS/TFB 8	F-14A Tomcat	K. Sedghi	AIM-54A	MiG-23ML	
29 October 1980	81 TFS/TFB 8	F-14A Tomcat	K. Sedghi	AIM-9P	MiG-23ML	
29 October 1980	81 TFS/TFB 8	F-14A Tomcat	K. Sedghi	AIM-9P	MiG-23ML	
10 November 1980	81 TFS/TFB 8	F-14A Tomcat	Unknown	AIM-7E4	MiG-23	
21 November 1980	TFB 8	F-14A Tomcat	Afshar	AIM-7E4	MiG-21	
27 November 1980	TFB 8	F-14A Tomcat	Afshar	AIM-54A	MiG-21	
2 December 1980	82 TFS/TFB 8	F-14A Tomcat	F. Dehghan	AIM-54A	MiG-21MF	
10 December 1980	TFB 8	F-14A Tomcat	Unknown	Unknown	Su-20	
22 December 1980	TFB 8	F-14A Tomcat	Unknown	AIM-54A	Unknown (Note: It is either a MiG-21 or a Su-20.)	
22 December 1980	TFB 8	F-14A Tomcat	Unknown	AIM-54A	Unknown	
30 December 1980	TFB 8	F-14A Tomcat	Unknown	Unknown	MiG-21	
7 January 1981	TFB 8	F-14A Tomcat	M. Masbough (Note: Cooper & Bishop do not record name of the pilot. Razoux identifies him as Mohammad Masbough.)	AIM-54A (Note: A single missile scored three aircraft flying close to each other, and damaged the fourth.)	MiG-23	
7 January 1981	TFB 8	F-14A Tomcat	M. Masbough	AIM-54A	MiG-23	
7 January 1981	TFB 8	F-14A Tomcat	M. Masbough	AIM-54A	MiG-23	
29 January 1981	TFB 6	F-14A Tomcat	Unknown	AIM-54	Su-20	
4 April 1981	TFB 6	F-14A Tomcat	Unknown	AIM-9P	MiG-23BN	
4 April 1981	TFB 6	F-14A Tomcat	Unknown	AIM-9P	MiG-23BN	
21 April 1981	TFB 6	F-14A Tomcat	Unknown	AIM-9P	MiG-23BN	
15 May 1981	82 TFS/TFB 7	F-14A Tomcat	J. Zandi	AIM-9P	MiG-21MF	
22 October 1981	82 TFS/TFB 7	F-14A Tomcat	S. Rostami	AIM-54A	Mirage F-1EQ	
22 October 1981	82 TFS/TFB 7	F-14A Tomcat	S. Rostami	AIM-54A	Mirage F-1EQ	
22 October 1981	82 TFS/TFB 7	F-14A Tomcat	S. Rostami	AIM-54A	Mirage F-1EQ	
22 October 1981	82 TFS/TFB 7	F-14A Tomcat	S. Rostami	AIM-7E	MiG-21MF	
11 December 1981	82 TFS/TFB 8	F-14A Tomcat	H. Al-e-Agha	AIM-54A	Mirage F-1EQ	
11 December 1981	TFB 8	F-14A Tomcat	R. Azad	AIM-54A	MiG-21MF	
January 1982 (Note: Exact day unknown.)	82 TFS/TFB 8	F-14A Tomcat	J. Zandi	AAM	MiG-21MF	
March 1982	72 TFS/TFB 1	F-14A Tomcat	Unknown	AIM-9P	Su-22	
21 July 1982	82 TFS/TFB 8	F-14A Tomcat	Toufanian	AIM-54A (Note: A single missile scored two aircraft flying close to each other.)	MiG-23MS	
21 July 1982	82 TFS/TFB 8	F-14A Tomcat	Toufanian	AIM-54A	MiG-23MS	
21 July 1982	81 TFS/TFB 8	F-14A Tomcat	Mousavi	AIM-54A	Su-22	
16 September 1982	TFB 8	F-14A Tomcat	S. Rostami	AIM-54A	MiG-25RB	
10 October 1982	TFB 8	F-14A Tomcat	J. Zandi	AIM-9P	MiG-23	
10 October 1982	TFB 8	F-14A Tomcat	J. Zandi	AIM-9P	MiG-23	
7 November 1982	TFB 8	F-14A Tomcat	Unknown	AIM-7E4	Su-22M-3K	
21 November 1982	TFB 8	F-14A Tomcat	M. Khosrodad	AIM-54A	MiG-23MS	
21 November 1982	TFB 8	F-14A Tomcat	M. Khosrodad	AIM-54A	MiG-23MS	
21 November 1982	TFB 8	F-14A Tomcat	M. Khosrodad	AIM-7E4	MiG-21	
27 November 1982	TFB 8	F-14A Tomcat	M. Khosrodad	AAM	SA 321	
1 December 1982	TFB 8	F-14A Tomcat	S. Rostami	AIM-54A	MiG-25RB	
4 December 1982	81 TFS/TFB 8	F-14A Tomcat	Toufanian	AIM-54A	MiG-25PD	
16 January 1983	TFB 8	F-14A Tomcat	Unknown	AIM-54A	MiG-23BN	
16 January 1983	TFB 8	F-14A Tomcat	Unknown	AIM-54A	Unknown	
16 January 1983	TFB 8	F-14A Tomcat	Unknown	AIM-54A	Unknown	
27 January 1983	73 TFS/TFB 7	F-14A Tomcat	Unknown	AAM	Su-20	
29 January 1983	73 TFS/TFB 7	F-14A Tomcat	Unknown	AAM	MiG-23MS	
June 1983	82 TFS/TFB 8	F-14A Tomcat	Afkhami	AAM	MiG-23	
28 July 1983	81 TFS/TFB 8	F-14A Tomcat	Unknown	AAM	Mirage F-1EQ	
28 July 1983	81 TFS/TFB 8	F-14A Tomcat	Unknown	AAM	Mirage F-1EQ	
6 August 1983	81 TFS/TFB 8	F-14A Tomcat	Unknown	AIM-54A	MiG-25PD	
31 August 1983	73 TFS/TFB 7	F-14A Tomcat	Unknown	AAM	Su-22M-3K	
14 February 1984	73 TFS/TFB 7	F-14A Tomcat	Unknown	AAM	Su-22M-3K	
25 March 1984	73 TFS/TFB 7	F-14A Tomcat	Unknown	AIM-54A	Tu-22B	
6 April 1984	81 TFS/TFB 8	F-14A Tomcat	Unknown	AIM-54A	Tu-22B	
6 April 1984	81 TFS/TFB 8	F-14A Tomcat	Unknown	AIM-54A	Tu-22B	
June 1984	82 TFS/TFB 8	F-14A Tomcat	Afkhami	AAM	Su-22	
March 1985	81 TFS/TFB 8	F-14A Tomcat	Unknown	AAM	MiG-27 (Note: The aircraft belonged to the Soviet Air Forces (VVS).)	
March 1985	81 TFS/TFB 8	F-14A Tomcat	Unknown	AAM	MiG-27	
26 March 1985	82 TFS/TFB 8	F-14A Tomcat	Unknown	AAM	Mirage F-1EQ	
26 March 1985	82 TFS/TFB 8	F-14A Tomcat	Unknown	AAM	Mirage F-1EQ	
26 March 1985	82 TFS/TFB 8	F-14A Tomcat	Unknown	AAM	Mirage F-1EQ	
15 February 1986	TFB 8	F-14A Tomcat	Unknown	AIM-54A	MiG-25RB	
16 February 1986	TFB 8	F-14A Tomcat	Unknown	AIM-54A	Tu-22B	
18 February 1986	72 TFS/TFB 7	F-14A Tomcat	Unknown	AIM-54A	Mirage F-1EQ	
14 March 1986	82 TFS/TFB 8	F-14A Tomcat	Toufanian	AIM-9P	Mirage 5 (Note: The aircraft belonged to the Egyptian Air Force (EAF).)	
April 1986	82 TFS/TFB 8	F-14A Tomcat	J. Zandi	AAM	MiG-23	
April 1986	82 TFS/TFB 8	F-14A Tomcat	J. Zandi	AIM-54A	MiG-23PD	
12 July 1986	TFB 6	F-14A Tomcat	Reza (Note: The pilot is as mononymously identified as 'Reza' by Cooper and Bishop, thus it is unknown what the full-name is, and whether it is a surname or first name.)	AIM-7E4	MiG-23ML	
August 1986	TFB 8	F-14A Tomcat	Unknown	AAM	Su-22	
August 1986	TFB 8	F-14A Tomcat	Unknown	AAM	Su-22	
August 1986	TFB 8	F-14A Tomcat	Unknown	AAM	Su-22	
August 1986	TFB 8	F-14A Tomcat	Unknown	AAM	MiG-23	
August 1986	TFB 8	F-14A Tomcat	Unknown	AAM	MiG-23	
6 October 1986	TFB 6	F-14A Tomcat	Unknown	AIM-54A	Mirage F-1EQ	
6 October 1986	TFB 6	F-14A Tomcat	Unknown	None (Note: Aircraft downed by manoeuvre.)	Mirage F-1EQ	
7 October 1986	TFB 6	F-14A Tomcat	Afshar	AAM	Mirage F-1EQ	
7 October 1986	TFB 6	F-14A Tomcat	Unknown (Note: Cooper and Bishop identify the pilot as 'Afshar's wingman'.)	AAM	Mirage F-1EQ	
14 October 1986	81 TFS/TFB 8	F-14A Tomcat	Unknown	AIM-54A	MiG-23	
1986	73 TFS/TFB 7	F-14A Tomcat	Unknown	AIM-54A	MiG-25BM	
23 January 1987	81 TFS/TFB 8	F-14A Tomcat	Moslemi	AIM-7E4	MiG-23ML	
23 January 1987	81 TFS/TFB 8	F-14A Tomcat	M. Zooghi	AIM-9P	MiG-23ML	
18 February 1987	73 TFS/TFB 7	F-14A Tomcat	H. Agha	AIM-7E4	Mirage F-1EQ	
18 February 1987	73 TFS/TFB 7	F-14A Tomcat	H. Agha	AIM-9P	Mirage F-1EQ	
18 February 1987	73 TFS/TFB 7	F-14A Tomcat	H. Agha	AIM-54A	Mirage F-1EQ	
20 February 1987	81 TFS/TFB 8	F-14A Tomcat	Amiraslani	AIM-54A	Mirage F-1EQ	
24 February 1987	Unknown	F-14A Tomcat	Unknown	AAM	MiG-23ML	
24 February 1987	Unknown	F-14A Tomcat	Unknown	AAM	Mirage F-1EQ-2	
February 1987	72 TFS/TFB 1	F-14A Tomcat	Afshar	AIM-54A	Su-22	
May 1987	TFB 8	F-14A Tomcat	A. Rahnavard	AIM-7E4	Su-22	
22 August 1987	82 TFS/TFB 8	F-14A Tomcat	Afkhami	AAM	MiG-23	
29 August 1987	82 TFS/TFB 8	F-14A Tomcat	J. Zandi	AAM	Mirage F-1EQ-5	
31 August 1987	82 TFS/TFB 8	F-14A Tomcat	Unknown	AAM	Mirage F-1EQ-5	
17 October 1987	TFB 8	F-14A Tomcat	Unknown	AIM-9	MiG-23BK	
17 October 1987	TFB 8	F-14A Tomcat	Unknown	AIM-9	MiG-23BK	
17 October 1987	TFB 8	F-14A Tomcat	Unknown	AIM-9	MiG-23BK	
4 November 1987	TFB 8	F-14A Tomcat	Unknown	AIM-9	Su-22M-4K	
11 November 1987	72 TFS/TFB 1	F-14A Tomcat	Unknown	AIM-54A	MiG-25BM	
15 November 1987	81 TFS/TFB 8	F-14A Tomcat	Afkhami	AIM-7	Mirage F-1EQ-5	
November 1987	82 TFS/TFB 6	F-14A Tomcat	J. Zandi	AIM-9P	Mirage F-1EQ	
9 February 1988	82 TFS/TFB 6	F-14A Tomcat	Ghiasi	AIM-7E4	Mirage F-1EQ-5	
9 February 1988	82 TFS/TFB 6	F-14A Tomcat	Ghiasi	AIM-9P	Mirage F-1EQ-5	
9 February 1988	82 TFS/TFB 6	F-14A Tomcat	Ghiasi	AIM-9P	Mirage F-1EQ	
15 February 1988	81 TFS/TFB 8	F-14A Tomcat	Toufanian	AIM-54A	Mirage F-1EQ	
16 February 1988	TFB 8	F-14A Tomcat	A. Rahnavard	AIM-9P	Mirage F-1EQ	
16 February 1988	TFB 8	F-14A Tomcat	A. Rahnavard	AIM-9P	Mirage F-1EQ	
25 February 1988	TFB 8	F-14A Tomcat	G. Esmaeili	AIM-54A	B-6D	
25 February 1988	TFB 8	F-14A Tomcat	G. Esmaeili	AIM-54A	C-601 (YJ-6)	
1 March 1988	82 TFS/TFB 8	F-14A Tomcat	Unknown	AAM	Su-20	
18 March 1988	81 TFS/TFB 6	F-14A Tomcat	Unknown	AAM	Mirage F-1EQ	
19 March 1988	81 TFS/TFB 6	F-14A Tomcat	Unknown	AIM-54A	MiG-23ML	
19 March 1988	81 TFS/TFB 6	F-14A Tomcat	Unknown	AIM-54A	Tu-22B	
19 March 1988	81 TFS/TFB 6	F-14A Tomcat	Unknown	AIM-54A	MiG-25RB	
20 March 1988	72 TFS/TFB 6	F-14A Tomcat	Unknown	AIM-54A	MiG-25RB	
22 March 1988	72 TFS/TFB 6	F-14A Tomcat	Unknown	AIM-54A	MiG-25RB	
24 March 1988	72 TFS/TFB 1	F-14A Tomcat	Unknown	AAM	Mirage F-1EQ	
15 May 1988	72 TFS/TFB 1	F-14A Tomcat	Afshar	AIM-9P	Mirage F-1EQ	
9 July 1988	81 TFS/TFB 8	F-14A Tomcat	M. Zoghi	AIM-9P	Mirage F-1EQ	
	IRIAA	AH-1J		20 mm M197 electric cannon	MiG-21	
	IRIAA	AH-1J		20 mm M197 electric cannon	MiG-21	
	IRIAA	AH-1J		20 mm M197 electric cannon	MiG-21	
	IRIAA	AH-1J		20 mm M197 electric cannon	Su-20	
	IRIAA	AH-1J (together with another aircraft)		20 mm M197 electric cannon	MiG-23	

== List of pilots ==
Pilot	Aircraft	Number of kills
Fazlollah Javidnia	F-14 Tomcat	12 or 11 (+2)
Jalil Zandi	F-14 Tomcat	11 or 4 (+5)
Fereidoun Ali-Mazandarani	F-14 Tomcat	9 or 11
Abolfazl Mehreganfar	F-14 Tomcat	6
Hassan Harandi	F-14 Tomcat	6
Shahram Rostami	F-14 Tomcat	5 or 3
Hossein Khalili	F-14 Tomcat	5
Jamshid Afshar	F-14 Tomcat	5 or 3
Jalil Moslemi	F-14 Tomcat	5
K. Sedghi	F-14 Tomcat	5
Toufanian	F-14 Tomcat	5
Mostafa Roustaei	F-14 Tomcat	5
Khalil Dashtizadeh	F-14 Tomcat	5
Assadollah Adeli	F-14 Tomcat	5
Mohammad Masbough	F-14 Tomcat	4
Yadollah Khalili	F-14 Tomcat	4
Abbas Afkhami	F-4 Phantom	4
Mohsen Mehnati	F-14 Tomcat	4
Hossein Farrokhi	F-14 Tomcat	4
Aliasghar Jahanbakhsh	F-14 Tomcat	3
Mohammad-Esmail Peyrovan	F-14 Tomcat	3
Hashem Al-e-Agha	F-14 Tomcat	3
Yadollah Javadpour	F-5 Tiger	3
Yadollah Sharifirad	F-5 Tiger	3
Siavash Bayani	F-4 Phantom	3
Abolfazl Houshyar	F-14 Tomcat	3
Jafar Bahadoran	F-14 Tomcat	3
Gholamreza Nezamabadi	F-14 Tomcat	3
Javad Shokraeefard	F-14 Tomcat	3
Source: Pierre Razoux (2015, 2019)
