= Fazlollah Javidnia =

Iranian fighter pilot

Timsar Fazlollah Javidnia
- Military career
- Allegiance: Iran
- Branch: Islamic Republic of Iran Air Force; Imperial Iranian Air Force
- Service years: 1970–2002
- Rank: 2nd brigadier general
- Nickname: Javid
- Conflicts: Iran–Iraq War

Fazlollah Javidnia (Persian: فضل‌الله جاویدنیا) is an Iranian retired fighter pilot and a Grumman F-14 Tomcat flying ace during the Iran–Iraq War.

== Career ==
During the war, he established reputation as a courageous and patriotic pilot within the Islamic Republic of Iran Air Force. In 2015, French military historian Pierre Razoux credited him with 12 aerial victories, naming him above Jalil Zandi and Fereidoun Ali-Mazandarani as the most successful pilot of the war. In 2019, he wrote that Javidnia has 11 confirmed kills in addition to 2 probable victories.

After the war, he continued his career successfully and reached the rank of brigadier general. He was retired in 2002 at the age of 51 and started to trade Persian carpets as his family business for some time. Javidnia later ceased business activities due to health issues and became involved in military research with an aim to promote a scientific approach towards the Iran–Iraq War.

== Bibliography ==
- A Battle in the Sky (2013): memoirs of Javidnia, written by Mohamma Moamma and published by Ketab Yusef and Emad Institute in Persian language

== See also ==
- List of Iranian flying aces
