= K. Sedghi =

Iranian Fighter pilot

Kazem Sedghi
- Military career
- Allegiance: Pahlavi Iran / Islamic Republic of Iran Air Force
- Branch: Islamic Republic of Iran Air Force; Imperial Iranian Air Force
- Conflicts: Iran–Iraq War

Kazem Sedghi (Persian: صدقی) was an Iranian F-14 Tomcat fighter pilot in the Imperial Iranian Air Force and the Islamic Republic of Iran Air Force during the Iran–Iraq War. Sedghi has been credited with 5 confirmed aerial victories against Iraqi aircraft during the war, a record that qualifies him as a flying ace.

== Career ==
Confirmed victories of Sedghi include:

#	Date	Unit	Weapon	Victim
1	22 October 1980	81 TFS/TFB 8	AIM-9P	MiG-23ML
2	29 October 1980	81 TFS/TFB 8	AIM-54A	MiG-23ML
3	29 October 1980	81 TFS/TFB 8	AIM-54A	MiG-23ML
4	29 October 1980	81 TFS/TFB 8	AIM-9P	MiG-23ML
5	29 October 1980	81 TFS/TFB 8	AIM-9P	MiG-23ML

=== Operation Sultan 10 ===
At the time he ranked captain, Sedghi shot down four MiG-23s in a single operation, Operation Sultan 10, on 29 October 1980 with two AIM-9 Sidewinder and two AIM-54 Phoenix missiles. During the mission, he flew on a formation led by Col. Afshar with wingman Capt. M. Taibbe. When he engaged MiG-23s, he had penetrated deep Iraqi soil and was low on fuel, and managed to refuel before landing home safely. Three of the four pilots in the downed aircraft were confirmed dead, including Captain Ahmed Sabah who had two confirmed kills against Iranian F-5 Tigers.

== See also ==
- List of Iranian flying aces
