= Hashem Al-e-Agha =

Iranian fighter pilot (1945–1984)

- Born: 18 November 1945; Kermanshah, Iran
- Died: 11 August 1984 (aged 38); Over the Persian Gulf
- Children: 2
- Military career
- Allegiance: Iran
- Branch: Islamic Republic of Iran Air Force; Imperial Iranian Air Force
- Service years: 1965–1984
- Rank: Colonel
- Units: 4th Tactical Fighter Base; 7th Tactical Fighter Base; 1st Tactical Fighter Base; 8th Tactical Fighter Base
- Conflicts: Iran–Iraq War †

Hashem Al-e-Agha (Persian: هاشم آل‌آقا; November 18, 1945 – August 11, 1984) was an Iranian fighter pilot. Al-e-Agha served as an instructor pilot and commander for the Islamic Republic of Iran Air Force during the Iran–Iraq War while flying the F-14 Tomcat. Following basic flight training, Al-e-Agha underwent specialized training in the F-14 in the United States before serving as an instructor for Iranian students. During the Iran–Iraq War, Al-e-Agha assisted in establishing air superiority over the border region of Khuzestan prior to serving in Iranian air-defense operations. While escorting Iranian oil tankers in the Persian Gulf, Al-e-Agha was shot down during an attack by planes of the Iraqi Air Force.

== Career ==
=== Early years ===
Al-e-Agha entered the Imperial Iranian Air Force as a cadet and following completing his basic and elementary flight training, he was assigned to the 43rd Tactical Training Squadron at the 4th Tactical Fighter Base in order to fly with Northrop F-5. He was then converted to McDonnell Douglas F-4 Phantom II at the 1st Tactical Fighter Base. In 1976, he was handpicked to train as a Grumman F-14 Tomcat pilot in the United States and upon returning to Iran in 1978 was a qualified instructor of the aircraft at the 8th Tactical Fighter Base in Isfahan.

=== Iran–Iraq War ===
Al-e-Agha continued his service after the Iranian Revolution and by August 1980, was appointed as the deputy commander of the 8th TFB. He was then tasked by his commander, Colonel Sadeghpour, to provide refresher training for understaffed crew of F-14s in the wake of revolutionary chaos in the airbase. By mid-September 1980 Al-e-Agha flew more than 40 sorties with around two dozen pilots, in addition to launching a campaign to persuade dismissed officers back to service, together with IRIAF commander Colonel Javad Fakoori.

By November 1980, he coordinated the operations of aircraft under his command with several intelligence agencies and then on his initiative, a center to control all aerial operations over the battlefield in Khuzestan was established in Ahvaz, named Direct Air Support Center. This proved to be very effective in establishing Iranian air superiority over Khuzestan and F-14s scored many confirmed kills against Iraqi aircraft. Al-e-Agha also played an active role in re-establishment of the 11th Combat Command Training Squadron in Spring 1981, a unit which trained dozens of new pilots with F-5s.

In 1983, he was moved to Tehran and appointed as the IRIAF 's deputy to Chief of Operations. In that capacity, he acted as the "primary planner of the air force" despite being the second person in the hierarchy. He also was behind most of air-defense operations. Al-e-Agha served in that position until he was killed in action in 1984.

According to Brigadier General Ahmad Sadik of the Iraqi Air Force (IrAF) who served in the Intelligence Department, the IrAF was desperately in search of an opportunity to neutralize Al-e-Agha, thus closely tracked his activities and whenever he was airborne, special warnings were issued.

Hashem Al-e-Agha was martyred on August 11, 1984 when his Tomcat was attacked by several Iraqi Dassault Mirage F1 and shot down by a Super 530 missile. His final mission was escorting Iranian oil tankers out of the Persian Gulf.

==== Aerial victories ====
The exact number of kills by Al-e-Agha remains unknown, besides he reportedly had an indifferent attitude toward his personal record. French military historian Pierre Razoux has credited him with 3 confirmed kills. Cooper and Bishop have verified successful shooting down of an Iraqi MiG-21MF with AIM-7E4 in October 1980, while maintaining that he had definitely downed one of the two Mirage F-1EQs in a December 1981 aerial skirmish (it is probable that the other was downed by Al-e-Agha too). Cooper further attributes another victory to Al-e-Agha sometime in October 1982, in which he fired an AIM-9 Sidewinder and sent one of the two Iraqi Sukhoi Su-22s into the waters of the Persian Gulf at the time escorting commercial vessels between Bandar Mahshahr and the Kharg Island.

The details of these aerial victories are as the following:

#	Date	Unit	Weapon	Victim
1	20 October 1980	81 TFS/TFB 8	AIM-7E4	MiG-21MF
2	11 December 1981	82 TFS/TFB 8	AIM-54A	Mirage F-1EQ
3?	11 December 1981	82 TFS/TFB 8	AIM-54A	Mirage F-1EQ
4	October 1982	82 TFS/TFB 8	AIM-9	Sukhoi Su-22

== Commanding style ==
Cooper describes tactics planned by Al-e-Agha as "innovative" and his commanding style as "leading by example". Al-e-Agha continued to fly combat sorties until his death, regardless of not being required to do so and also repeated requests to stop risking his life in such missions.

He was an "economical" pilot in terms of missile expenditure, avoiding firing expensive AIM-54 Phoenix missiles –which Iran had a limited stock of and was unable to supply as a result of arms embargo– from longer range and persistently advised his colleagues to keep using that missile to an absolute minimum.

Al-e-Agha ignored the IIAF/IRIAF tradition of treating RIOs as "second-class citizens" and while he encouraged other pilots to do the same, he voluntarily flew in the back-seat of less experienced and lower-ranking pilots. This eventually resulted in equal recognition of pilots and RIOs by the IRIAF.

== Personal life ==
According to Tom Cooper, Al-e-Agha was a non-religious person. He had two children.
