= Mostafa Roustaei =

Iranian amateur astronomer and retired fighter pilot

- Born: 1951 (age 74–75)
- Died: 20 August 2026
- Military career
- Allegiance: Pahlavi Iran / Islamic Republic of Iran Air Force
- Branch: Islamic Republic of Iran Air Force; Imperial Iranian Air Force
- Service years: 1970–2000
- Rank: Colonel
- Conflicts: Iran–Iraq War

Mostafa Roustaei (Persian: مصطفی روستایی) was an Iranian amateur astronomer and retired fighter pilot who flew the Grumman F-14 Tomcat during the Iran–Iraq War. French military historian Pierre Razoux has credited him with 5 aerial victories, a record that qualifies him as a flying ace.

== Career ==
Roustaei was hired by the IIAF in 1970 and after 30 years of service, he was retired with the rank of colonel. He served for some time as the chief operations officer of the 6th Tactical Fighter Base. A U.S. trained pilot, he graduated from the AETC course at Laughlin Air Force Base in 1974. He was subsequently certified with F-4D/E Phantom II, an aircraft he flew for 2200 hours before switching to F-14 Tomcat. He flew a further 2086 hours with the latter.

=== Aerial victories ===
According to aviation author Kash Ryan, Roustaei's aerial victories verified by his logbooks and corroborated with other accounts include four using AIM-54 Phoenix missiles and one maneuver kill, against two MiG-23s, a MiG-21 and a pair of Dassault Mirage F1s. The details are as follows:

#	Date	Aircraft serial	RIO	Weapon	Victim
1	15 January 1981	3-6027	Capt. A. Jalal-Abadi	AIM-54A	MiG-23
2	5 October 1981	3-6036	1Lt. Ahmad R. Fereydouni	AIM-54A	MiG-23
3	26 October 1982	3-6078	1Lt. Reza Tahmasbi	None	MiG-21
4	7 August 1984	3-6055	Capt. Hossein Sayyari	AIM-54A	Mirage F-1EQ
5	7 August 1984	3-6055	Capt. Hossein Sayyari	AIM-54A	Mirage F-1EQ

== See also ==
- List of Iranian flying aces
