= Jalil Moslemi =

Iranian pilot

- Military career
- Allegiance: Pahlavi Iran / Islamic Republic of Iran
- Branch: Islamic Republic of Iran Air Force; Imperial Iranian Air Force
- Conflicts: Iran–Iraq War

Jalil Moslemi (Persian: جلیل مسلمی) is an Iranian retired fighter pilot of Grumman F-14 Tomcat in the Imperial Iranian Air Force and the Islamic Republic of Iran Air Force who served during the Iran–Iraq War.

French military historian Pierre Razoux has credited him with 5 aerial victories, a record that qualifies him as a flying ace. Moslemi was part of the second group of Iranian pilots who were sent to the United States for training in June 1974. He ranked captain at the time he was assigned to the VFA-101 of the Naval Air Station Oceana.

Cooper and Bishop have attributed an aerial victory dating 23 January 1987 against a MiG-23ML with a AIM-7 Sparrow missile to Moslemi.

== See also ==
- List of Iranian flying aces
