= Jamshid Afshar =

Iranian fighter pilot

- Military career
- Allegiance: Pahlavi Iran / Islamic Republic of Iran
- Branch: Islamic Republic of Iran Air Force; Imperial Iranian Air Force
- Conflicts: Iran–Iraq War

Jamshid Afshar (Persian: جمشید افشار) is an Iranian retired fighter pilot who flew with Grumman F-14 Tomcat during the Iran–Iraq War. He has been credited him with 5 or 6 confirmed aerial victories, a record that qualifies him as a flying ace.

== Career ==
Afshar was part of the second group of Iranian pilots who were sent to the United States for training in June 1974. He ranked captain at the time he was assigned to the VFA-101 of the Naval Air Station Oceana. He played a key role in planning Operation Sultan 10, along with Major H. Shoghi.

=== Aerial victories ===
Cooper and Bishop have verified the following six as confirmed kills of Afshar:

| # | Date | Unit | Weapon | Victim |
|---|---|---|---|---|
| 1 | 13 October 1980 | TFB 8 | AAM | MiG-23BN |
| 2 | 21 November 1980 | TFB 8 | AIM-7E4 | MiG-21 |
| 3 | 27 November 1980 | TFB 8 | AIM-54A | MiG-21 |
| 4 | 7 October 1986 | TFB 6 | AAM | Mirage F1EQ |
| 5 | February 1987 | 72 TFS/TFB 1 | AIM-54A | Su-22 |
| 6 | 15 May 1988 | 72 TFS/TFB 1 | AIM-9P | Mirage F1EQ |

== See also ==
- List of Iranian flying aces
