= 1893 in Iran =

- Decades
- See also: Other events of 1893; Years in Iran

The following lists events that happened during 1893 in Qajar era.

== Incumbents ==
- Monarch: Naser al-Din Shah Qajar

== Births ==
- February 26 – Hossein Khan Motamed, surgeon.
- March 7 – Esmail Merat, Iranian politician.
- March 17 – Seyyed Mohammad Hojjat Kooh Kamari, Iranian cleric.
- May 9 – Hambarsoom Grigorian, Armenian musician.
- ? – Ahmad Nakhjavan, military leader from Iran.
- ? – Ahmad Sohrab, Persian-American author.
- ? – Asghar the Murderer, Iranian serial killer.
- ? – Javad Bushehri, Iranian politician.

== Deaths ==
- ? – Mirza Hasan Ali Nasir ol-Molk, Qajar politician.
