= List of Iranian flying aces =

The following is a list of flying aces from Iran.

== Flying aces ==
=== Iran–Iraq war (1980–1988) ===
- Fazlollah Javidnia, 12 or 11 (+2 probable) victories
- Jalil Zandi, 11 or 9 (+3 probable) victories
- Fereidoun Ali-Mazandarani, 9 or 11 victories
- Abolfazl Mehreganfar, 6 victories
- Hassan Harandi, 6 victories
- Shahram Rostami, 5 or 6 victories
- Jamshid Afshar, 5 or 6 victories
- Hossein Khalili, 5 victories
- Jalil Moslemi, 5 victories
- K. Sedghi, 5 victories
- Mostafa Roustaei, 5 victories
- Assadollah Adeli, 5 victories

=== Other ===
- Mohammad Taqi Pessian who flew several combat missions for the Imperial German Air Service during World War I, reputedly shoot down up to 25 aircraft in aerial dogfights along the western front.
