= Kirkuk International Airport =

International airport in Kirkuk, Iraq

Kirkuk international Airport مطار كركوك الدولي
- IATA: KIK; ICAO: ORKK

Summary
- Airport type: Military/Public
- Operator: Kirkuk Airport Authority
- Serves: Kirkuk
- Location: Iraq
- Elevation AMSL: 1,061 ft (323 m)
- Coordinates: 35°28′10″N 44°20′56″E
- Website: https://kik-airport.com/en/home/

Map
- Location within Iraq

Runways
| Direction | Length | | Surface |
| Direction | ft | m | Surface |
|---|---|---|---|
| 13/31 | 9,809 | 2,990 | Concrete |
| 14/32 | 8,535 | 2,601 | Concrete |
| | 2,624 | 800 | Asphalt |
| | 1,066 | 325 | Graded Earth |

Statistics (2022)
- Passengers: 7,214
- Aircraft operations: 132
- Source: ICAA, COSIT.

Kirkuk International Airport (IATA: KIK, ICAO: ORKK) is an airport located in Kirkuk, Iraq. The airport officially opened in 16 October 2022 for civil visitors.

== History ==
In 1951, Kirkuk Airport was built, and gained international status in 1957. By July 1958, the military component of the airport was equipped with accommodations for 45 personnel, a single steel hangar, administrative offices, and a small hospital. In 1973, a new apron was constructed. In the 11 March 1973 Air Order of Battle, 11 Sukhoi Su-17, 18 Soviet Mikoyan-Gurevich MiG-15, 1 Mikoyan-Gurevich MiG-17 aircraft, and 5 Westland Wessex helicopters were based at Kirkuk Air Base. 8 dummy Sukhoi Su-17s and 5 unserviceable MiG-17s in poor condition were also reported. In 1983, Kirkuk Air Base was substantially upgraded to improve the deployment flexibility of the Iraqi Air Force (IQAF). It was also as part of a national drive to construct new airfields and renovate existing airfields. The existing runway 14/32 was extended to 3,208 meters, and runway 13/31 was constructed with a length of 3,101 meters. Additional installation of facilities included 4 high-speed approaches on either ends of both runways, which totalled up to 8, and one end-connecting link. There were two dispersal facilities that totalled up to 13 hardstands/aircraft bunkers, with one at the end of each high-speed approaches. By June 1983, Kirkuk Air Base's new runway was under early stages of construction.

At the onset of the Iran–Iraq War, Al-Hurriah was the main airbase use by the newly purchased Mirage F1s. It was bombed in Operation Sultan 10 in 1980 in the early phase of the war. Kirkuk Regional Air Base was home to the 506th Air Expeditionary Group. The group maintained base security, conducted safe flying operations and actively supported base agencies in support of Operation Iraqi Freedom, Operation New Dawn, and other U.S. Air Forces Central and U.S. Central Command contingency plans. Approximately 1,000 active-duty, Reserve and Guard Airmen were assigned to the 506th AEG during any given Air Expeditionary Force rotation. Additionally, approximately 5,000 soldiers are assigned to the installation, commonly known as Forward Operating Base Warrior. As of July 2011, the majority of these soldiers were assigned to the 1st Brigade Combat Team, U.S. 1st Infantry Division, and the U.S. 1st Cavalry Division.

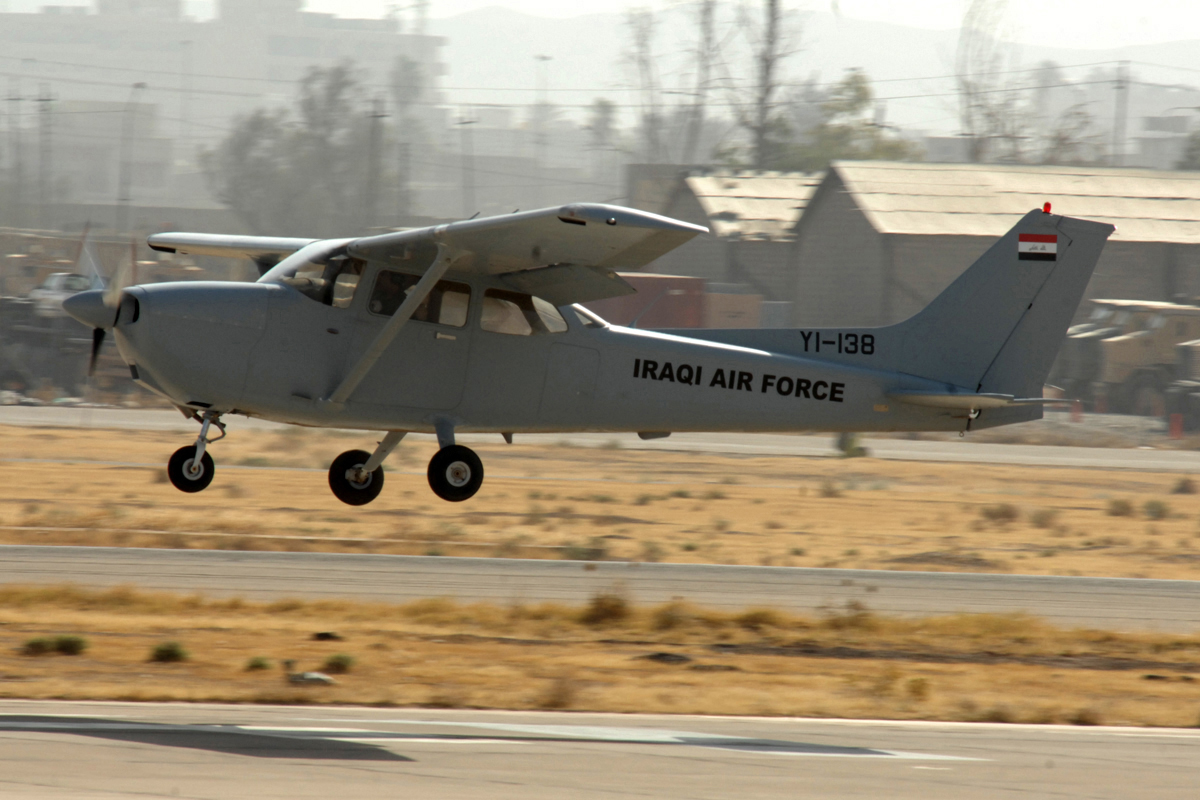
An Iraqi Air Force Cessna 172 lands at Kirkuk Air Base.

The 506th AEG was the most forward deployed Air Force Group in Operation Iraqi Freedom. The heritage of the 506th AEG is tied to the famous 506th Fighter Group of World War II. Among the base agencies the 506th AEG actively supports is the Kirkuk Provincial Reconstruction Team (PRT). Since 2003, the airport was used by the U.S. Air Force as a military airport. It was returned to the Iraqi Army in November 2011. In 2012, the Iraqi Transportation Ministry decided to move the military section to another location, a prerequisite for turning the air base into a civilian airport. According to the (Nazaha) committee, the government allocated 93.5 million dollars from the airport project.

== Airlines and destinations ==
The airport reopened to civilian aircraft in 2022.

| Airlines | Destinations |
|---|---|
| Iraqi Airways | Ankara, Baghdad, Baku, Istanbul |
| Turkish Airlines | Istanbul (suspended) |

== Location ==
Kirkuk RAB lies in northeastern region of Iraq in the outskirts of the city of Kirkuk, one of the largest metropolitan areas in Iraq. Kirkuk is approximately 180 mi (290 km) north of Baghdad.
