= Abolfazl Mehreganfar =

Iranian Retired fighter pilot

Timsar Abolfazl Mehreganfar
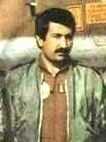
- Mehreganfar in 1979
- Military career
- Allegiance: Pahlavi Iran / Islamic Republic of Iran
- Branch: Islamic Republic of Iran Air Force; Imperial Iranian Air Force
- Rank: 2nd brigadier general
- Conflicts: Iran–Iraq War

Abolfazl Mehreganfar (Persian: ابوالفضل مهرگان‌فر) is an Imperial Iranian and Islamic Iranian retired fighter pilot of Grumman F-14 Tomcat who served during the Iran–Iraq War.

French military historian Pierre Razoux has credited him with 6 aerial victories, a record that qualifies him as a flying ace. He achieved the rank of 2nd brigadier general.

== See also ==
- List of Iranian flying aces
