= Hassan Harandi =

Iranian retired fighter pilot

- Harandi in 1979
- Military career
- Allegiance: Pahlavi Iran / Islamic Republic of Iran
- Branch: Islamic Republic of Iran Air Force; Imperial Iranian Air Force
- Service years: 1971–2001
- Rank: Colonel
- Conflicts: Iran–Iraq War

Hassan Harandi (Persian: حسن هرندی) is an Iranian retired fighter pilot of Grumman F-14 Tomcat who served during the Iran–Iraq War. French military historian Pierre Razoux has credited him with 6 aerial victories, a record that qualifies him as a flying ace.

== See also ==
- List of Iranian flying aces
