= Bahman Behmard =

Iranian brigadier general

Bahman Bahmard
- بهمن بهمرد
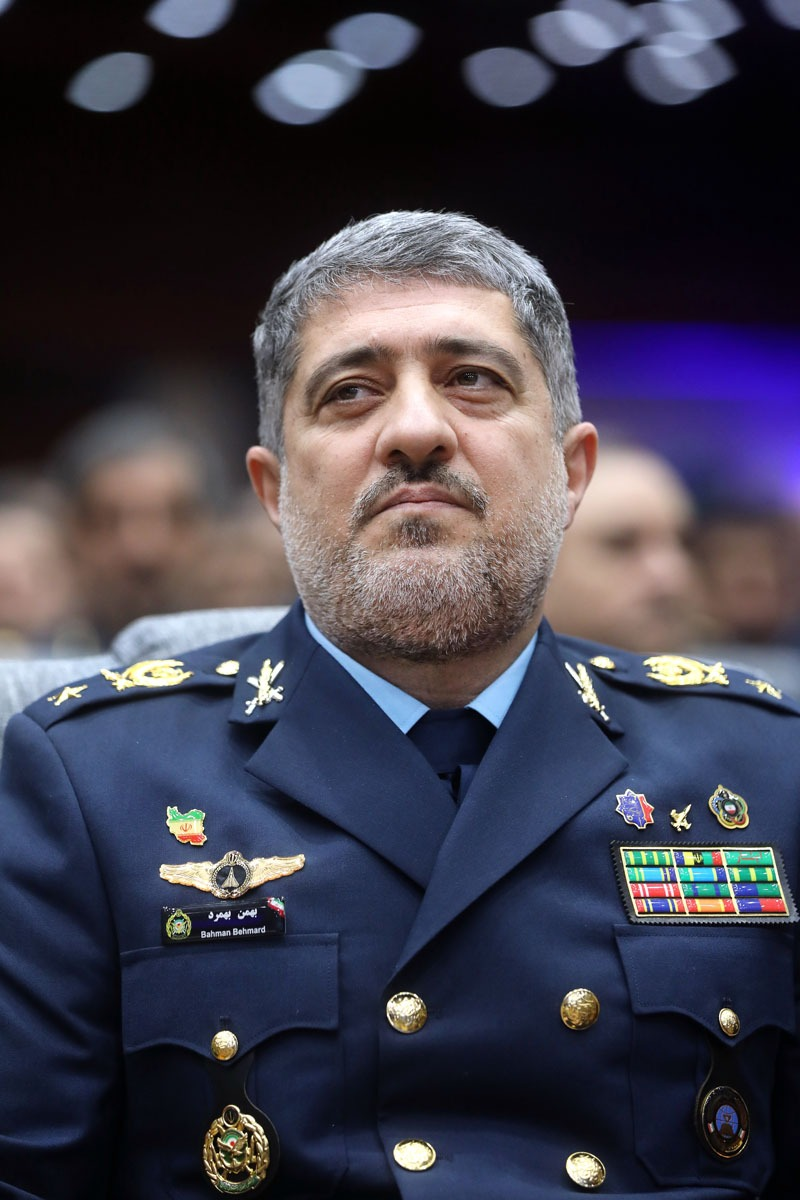
- Behmard in 2026
- Born: Miandoab, Pahlavi Iran
- Military career
- Allegiance: Iran
- Branch: Islamic Republic of Iran Air Force
- Service years: 1990–present
- Rank: Brigadier General
- Commands: Islamic Republic of Iran Air Force (2025–present); Deputy Commander of the Operations Directorate of the General Staff of the Armed Forces (2023–2025); 1st Tactical Air Base (Mehrabad, Tehran) (2021–2023); 4th Tactical Air Base (Dezful) (2019–2021)
- Conflicts: Twelve-Day War; 2026 Iran war

Bahman Bahmard (Persian: بهمن بهمرد) is an Iranian military officer with the rank of Brigadier General, serving as the Commander of the Iranian Air Force since 17 December 2025. He is originally from Miandoab, West Azerbaijan province.

Behmard joined the air force in 1990 and served as the commander of the 4th Iranian Air Force Base in Dezful (Persian: بهمن بهمرد) starting in 2019 for about two years, and immediately after that he commanded the Air Force Base in Mehrabad, Tehran, when he was promoted to the rank of 2nd Brigadier General. He was then appointed in 2023 as Deputy Commander of the Operations Directorate of the General Staff of the Armed Forces and was promoted to the rank of Brigadier General.

Military offices
Preceded by Hamid Vahedi	Commander of the Islamic Republic of Iran Army Air Force; 17 December 2025–incumbent	Succeeded by Incumbent
