= Hamid Vahedi =

Iran army general (born 1965)

Amir Hamid Vahedi
- حمید واحدی
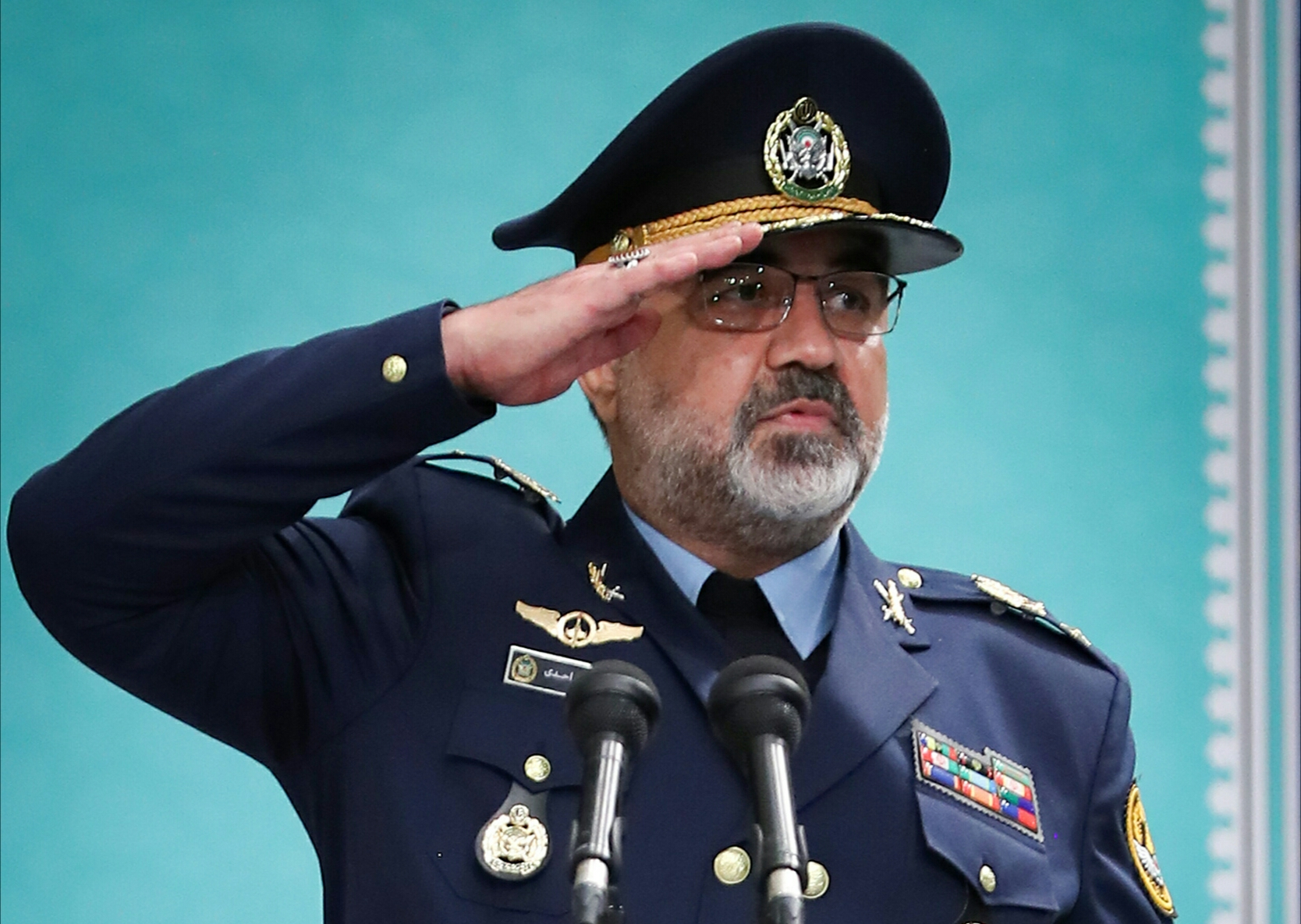
- Vahedi in 2022
- Born: 14 April 1965 (age 61); Rafsanjan, Pahlavi Iran
- Military career
- Allegiance: Iran
- Branch: Islamic Republic of Iran Air Force
- Service years: 1984–present
- Rank: Brigadier General
- Commands: Iranian Air Force (2021–2025); Deputy Commander of the Iranian Air Force (2018–2021); Deputy Inspector of the Islamic Republic of Iran Army (2017–2018); 2nd Tactical Air Base (Tabriz) (2013–2017)
- Conflicts: Iran–Iraq War; Iran–PJAK conflict; Western Iran clashes; Twelve-Day War

Hamid Vahedi (Persian: حمید واحدی; born 14 April 1965 in Rafsanjan) is a Brigadier General of the Islamic Republic of Iran Army, a Sukhoi-24 pilot, who was the Commander of the Air Force of the Islamic Republic of Iran Army from 19 September 2021 to 17 December 2025.

== Biography ==
Hamid Vahedi was born on 1 April 1965 in Rafsanjan, Kerman province. He began his career in the Air Force of the Islamic Republic of Iran in 1984, and after completing a preparatory course at the Shahid Khazraei Air Training Command, he graduated from the Nahaja Pilot School in 1988 and officially began his career as a fighter pilot in Nahaja. He completed the Su-24 fighter jet simulator course in Russia in 2000 and 2001. In 2008, he also completed the Command and Staff School (DAFS) course in the defence affairs management field.

Vahedi has held the following appointments:

- Deputy Chief of the Inspectorate and Safety Directorate, Islamic Republic of Iran Air Force
- Commander of the 2nd Tactical Air Base (Tabriz) (2013–2017)
- Deputy Inspector of the Islamic Republic of Iran Army (2017–2018)
- Deputy Commander of the Islamic Republic of Iran Air Force (2018–2021)
- Commander of the Islamic Republic of Iran Air Force (2021–2025)

He was the Deputy Commander of the Army Air Force from 16 September 2018 to 18 September 2021.

Following the promotion of Aziz Nasirzadeh from Deputy Commander to Commander of the Islamic Republic of Iran Air Force, Vahedi was appointed Deputy Commander of the Air Force upon the recommendation of Nasirzadeh and with the approval of Abdolrahim Mousavi, the Commander-in-Chief of the Islamic Republic of Iran Army.

After Aziz Nasirzadeh was promoted to Deputy Chief of the General Staff of the Armed Forces, Vahedi succeeded him as Commander of the Air Force. His appointment was made on the recommendation of Abdolrahim Mousavi, with the approval of the Supreme Leader of Iran Ali Khamenei.

Military offices
Preceded by Aziz Nasirzadeh	Commander of the Islamic Republic of Iran Army Air Force; 19 September 2021–17 December 2025	Succeeded by Bahman Behmard
