= Fereidoun Ali-Mazandarani =

Iranian fighter pilot

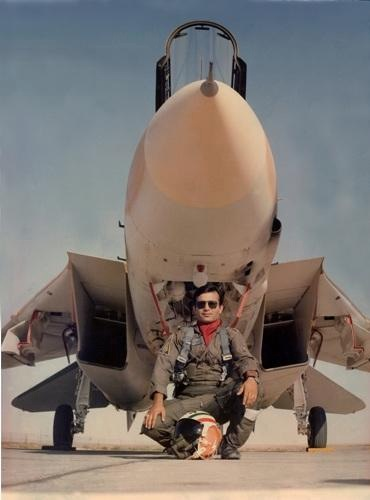
- Military career
- Allegiance: Pahlavi Iran / Islamic Republic of Iran
- Branch: Islamic Republic of Iran Air Force; Imperial Iranian Air Force
- Service years: 1971–1999
- Rank: Colonel
- Nickname: Ferry
- Conflicts: Iran–Iraq War

Fereidoun Ali-Mazandarani (Persian: فریدون علی‌مازندرانی) is an Imperial and Islamic Iranian retired fighter pilot and a Grumman F-14 Tomcat flying ace during the Iran–Iraq War.

== Career ==
Mazandarani claims 16 aerial victories against Iraqi aircraft during the 1980s, including eight using AIM-54 missiles, one using a MIM-23 missile, two with the Vulcan M61A gun, as well as five manoeuvre kills. French military historian Pierre Razoux has credited him with 9 or 11 confirmed kills.

According to Austrian aviation historian Tom Cooper, Mazandarani and his co-pilot Qassem Soltani may be the first pilots to have ever shot an aircraft down using AIM-54 Phoenix missile, with a claimed victory against a MiG-23 on 17 September 1980 despite the fact the Iranian air force does not officially acknowledge this victory.

== See also ==
- List of Iranian flying aces
