= Shahram Rostami =

Iranian fighter pilot

Timsar Shahram Rostami
- Born: 7 June 1948 (age 78); Ābkhāreh, East Azerbaijan, Pahlavi Iran
- Military career
- Allegiance: Pahlavi Iran / Islamic Republic of Iran
- Branch: Air Force
- Service years: 1967–2007
- Rank: Brigadier General
- Commands: Joint Staff
- Conflicts: Iran–Iraq War

Shahram Rostami (Persian: شهرام رستمی) is a former Imperial Iranian fighter pilot who was active in the Iran-Iraq War. With six definite aerial victories, against three MiGs and three Mirage F.1s (with a single AIM-54 missile), he qualifies as a flying ace and one of the best scoring pilots of F-14 Tomcat.

Rostami held office as the deputy commander of Islamic Republic of Iran Air Force and the chairman of Joint Staff of the Islamic Republic of Iran Army.

== Aerial victories ==
Confirmed victories of Rostami include:

| # | Date | Unit | Weapon | Victim |
|---|---|---|---|---|
| 1 | 1981-10-22 | 82 TFS/TFB 7 | AIM-54A | Mirage F1EQ |
| 2 | 1981-10-22 | 82 TFS/TFB 7 | AIM-54A | Mirage F1EQ |
| 3 | 1981-10-22 | 82 TFS/TFB 7 | AIM-54A | Mirage F1EQ |
| 4 | 1981-10-22 | 82 TFS/TFB 7 | AIM-7E | MiG-21MF |
| 5 | 1982-09-16 | TFB 8 | AIM-54A | MiG-25RB |
| 6 | 1982-12-01 | TFB 8 | AIM-54A | MiG-25RB |

== See also ==
- List of Iranian flying aces

Military offices
| Preceded by Mostafa Torabipour | Chairman of the Joint Staff of the Islamic Republic of Iran Army; 2000–2001 | Succeeded by Abdolali Pourshasb |
