= Ahmad Nakhjavan =

Iranian general (1893–1966)

Ahmad Nakhjavan احمد نخجوان
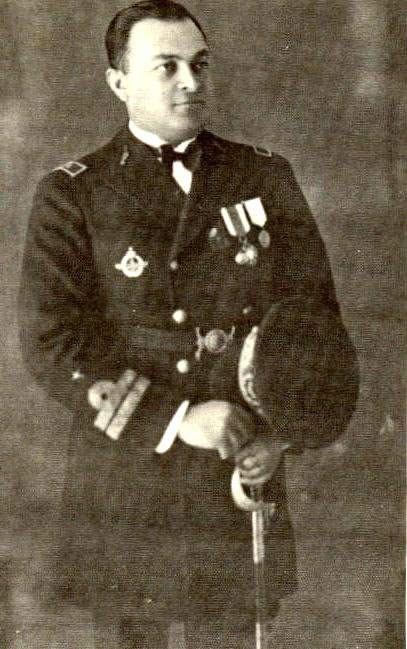
- Nakhjavan in the 1957

Minister of War
- In office 26 October 1939 – 9 March 1942
- Monarchs: Reza Shah; Mohammad Reza Pahlavi
- Prime Minister: Ahmad Matin-Daftari; Ali Mansur; Mohammad Ali Foroughi
- Preceded by: Esmail Amir-Fazli
- Succeeded by: Mohammad Ali Foroughi (Acting); Amanullah Jahanbani
- In office October 1934 – 14 April 1936
- Monarch: Reza Shah
- Prime Minister: Mohammad Ali Foroughi; Mahmoud Djam
- Preceded by: Jafar-Qoli Asad
- Succeeded by: Esmail Amir-Fazli

Commander of the Imperial Iranian Air Force
- In office 27 June 1944 – 1944
- Monarch: Mohammad Reza Pahlavi
- Prime Minister: Mohammad Sa'ed; Morteza-Qoli Bayat
- Preceded by: Mohammad Hossein Mirza Firouz
- Succeeded by: Mohammad-Hossein Amidi
- In office 15 May 1943 – 4 July 1943
- Monarch: Mohammad Reza Pahlavi
- Prime Minister: Ali Soheili
- Preceded by: Abdul-Majid Firouz and Mir-Mohammad Mohanna (co-commanders)
- Succeeded by: Mir-Mohammad Mohanna
- In office 17 December 1932 – 21 December 1936
- Monarch: Reza Shah
- Prime Minister: Mohammad Ali Foroughi; Mahmoud Djam
- Preceded by: Mohammad Sadegh Koupal
- Succeeded by: Ahmad Mirza-Khosravani
- In office 30 December 1930 – 29 June 1931
- Monarch: Reza Shah
- Prime Minister: Mehdi Qoli Hedayat
- Preceded by: Ahmad Mirza-Khosravani
- Succeeded by: Ahmad Mirza-Khosravani
- In office 1 June 1924 – 17 August 1930
- Monarchs: Ahmad Shah Qajar; Reza Shah
- Prime Minister: Reza Khan; Mohammad Ali Foroughi; Mostowfi ol-Mamalek; Mehdi Qoli Hedayat
- Preceded by: Reza Mizani
- Succeeded by: Ahmad Mirza-Khosravani

Personal details
- Born: 13 September 1893 Tabriz, East Azerbaijan province, Sublime State of Iran
- Died: 28 April 1966 (aged 72) Tehran, Tehran province, Imperial State of Iran
- Resting place: Zahir-od-dowleh cemetery

Military service
- Allegiance: Qajar Iran (1910–1925); Pahlavi Iran (1925–1966)
- Branch/service: Iranian Gendarmerie; Imperial Iranian Air Force
- Years of service: 1910–1966
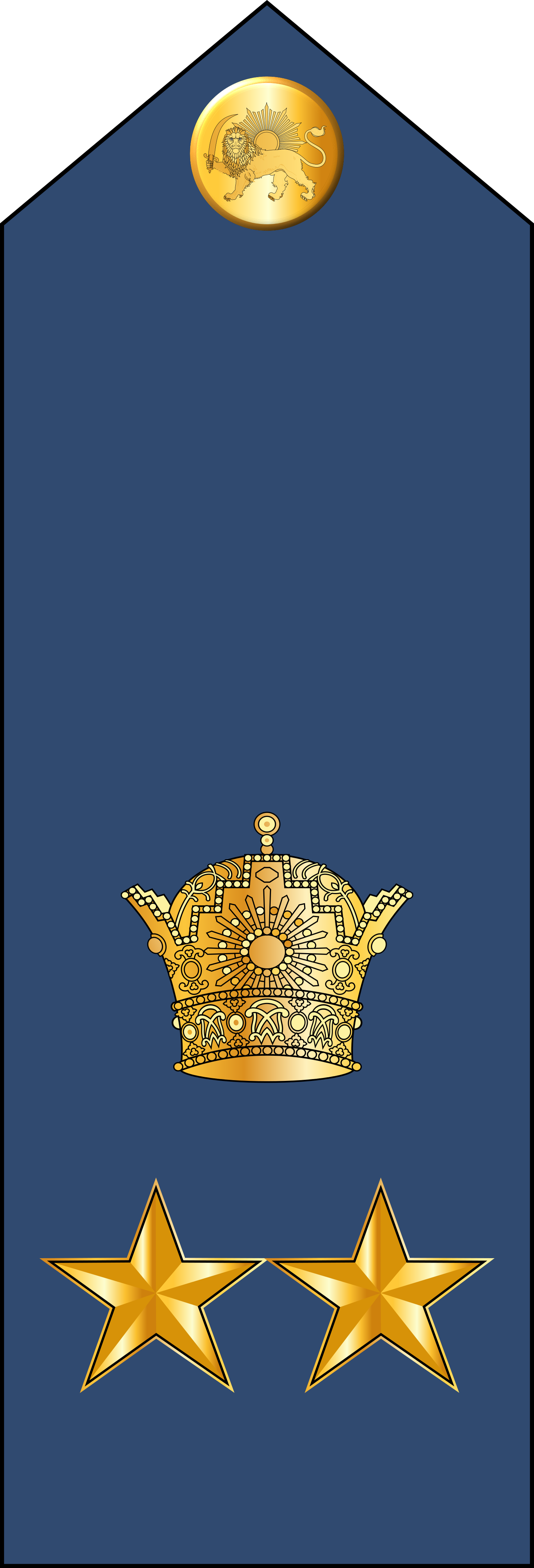
- Rank: Major General
- Battles/wars: World War II; Anglo-Soviet invasion of Iran

Ahmad Khan Nakhichevan (Persian: احمدخان نخجوان, 13 September 1893 – 28 April 1966) was an Iranian military leader, major general and Defense Minister.

== Biography ==
Ahmad Khan was born in 1893 in Tabriz and was the eldest son of Ali Khan of Nakhichevan. He belonged to the famous and influential Turkic Kangarlu tribe of Nakhichevan. Nakhichevan studied in France. After leaving school, he held various insignificant posts in Tehran. All this time he was the assistant and close friend of Mohammad Reza Pahlavi.

Mohammed Reza was declared heir to the throne on 1 January 1926. He was educated in Switzerland and graduated from the officer's school in Tehran. In 1938, returning from Europe, he visited Baku. During the reign of Reza Shah, he often took part in government meetings and actually served as the minister of war. General Ahmad Khan of Nakhichevan, who held the post of Minister of War at that time, was actually his assistant.

Colonel Ahmad Nakhjavan completed his pilot training in 1925, and in February of the same year, he flew to Iran with a plane purchased from France, and landed in Qala-e-Marghi on 5 March. Ahmad Nakhjavan became the first head of the Imperial Iranian Air Force and was the director of aviation with him until 1937. During this time he was changed several times and fired, but each time he returned to service after a short time. In 1929, he became a brigadier general.

In 1940, he became the acting Minister of War in Prime Minister Ahmad Matin's cabinet, and he was soon promoted to the rank of Major General. Nakhchivan was under the auspices of the Ministry of War until 29 September 1941, at the same time as the Soviet and British forces invaded Iran, and approved the plan to dismiss conscripts and recruit contract soldiers to members of the Supreme Army Council. This caused severe change and protests from Reza Shah; Therefore, Ahmad severely beat Nakhjavan and threw him in prison. He was imprisoned until 16 September and became Minister of War on 20 September, after the Shah resigned to restore Prime Minister Foroughi's cabinet. Thereafter, he was an inspector and head of Mohammad Reza Shah's military office for some time and died in 1967.

Ahmad Nakhjavan was the first Iranian pilot to fly a Breguet-19 aircraft with the Iranian flag and emblem from France to Tehran's Qala-e-Marghi base on 25 February 1925. Nakhchivan had trained in France and flew only 200 hours. Thus, on this date, the first aircraft of the Iranian Air Force, piloted by an Iranian, crossed the international borders and reached the Iranian airspace. During this period, the Iranian Air Force was removed from the form of a small office at the Army Command Headquarters and became a separate force called the Imperial Army Air Force of Iran.

Ahmad Nakhjavan, along with Esmail Merat, the then Minister of Culture, emphasized Persian orthography, and their efforts and those of others accompanied the Shah in ordering the establishment of a Persian language.

== Bibliography ==
- Dr. Baqer Aghili (2007). Reza Shah and the Uniformed Army. Tehran: Namak Publishing. ISBN 978-964-6895-05-8.
