= Operation Sultan 10 =

1980 Iranian attack in the Iran–Iraq War

- Part of Iran–Iraq War
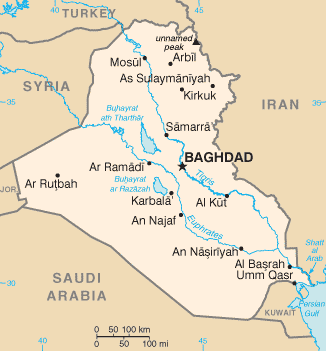
- Location: Northern Iraq
- Planned by: (Iran) Col. Afshar (Iran) Maj. Showqi
- Commanded by: (Iran) Col. Afshar
- Target: Al-Hurriah Airbase, Iraq
- Date: 29 October 1980
- Executed by: Islamic Republic of Iran Air Force: 32nd Squadron; 33rd Squadron
- Outcome: Operational success
- Casualties: 1 airbase bombed 1 French technician killed, another one injured 2 MiG-21 fighters and 3 Mil Mi-8 helicopters destroyed on the ground Dogfight: 4 MiG-23 fighters downed 3 pilots killed, 1 pilot captured

Operation Sultan 10 (Persian: عملیات سلطان ١٠) was an operation of the Islamic Republic of Iran Air Force (IRIAF) on 29 October 1980, at the beginning of the Iran–Iraq War. Six F-4E Phantom IIs from the IRIAF's 32nd and 33rd Squadrons took part in an attack on the Al-Hurriah Airbase near Mosul in Ba'athist Iraq.

== Motivation ==
In late October of 1980, commanders of the 1st Tactical Air Base (TAB 1) of Iran in Tehran received intelligence that French engineers had been sent to Iraq, and that a number of Mirage F1s that the Iraqi Air Force had bought from France were stationed at Al-Hurriah Airbase. The personnel of the French Air Force were appointed to train Iraqi pilots and technicians to use these new aircraft.

== Operation ==
=== Setup ===
The operation was named Sultan-10, as 10 aircraft were intended to cross the border, designated Sultans 1 through 10. The target was 180 miles deep in Iraqi territory, near Mosul. Eight F-4 Phantom fighters, call-signs Sultan 1 through 6, including two as reserve, three F-14 Tomcat fighter aircraft, Sultan 7 and 8, as well as one as reserve, and three Boeing 707 tankers, Sultan 9 and 10, including one as reserve, were utilized in the operation. Both Tomcat fighters were tasked with guarding the tankers, as the loss of these aircraft would result in the loss of all six Phantoms through lack of fuel. If the group crossed Iran's border and flew directly towards Mosul, they would have encountered air defence sites equipped with SA-2, SA-3, and SA-6 surface-to-air missiles. The Iranian commanders ordered strict radio silence, and started the operation before dawn. Immediately before crossing the border into Iraq, the aircraft refueled from the tankers. Then, flying through Turkish airspace, the strike package entered Iraq. The tankers and Tomcats maintained a low altitude, and awaited the Phantom group's return.

While protecting the tankers, the radar of one of the Tomcats remained disengaged, in order to reduce the probability of the aircraft being detected by Iraqi forces.

Meanwhile, the strike package attacked Mosul, and returned towards Iran. Because they were carrying the maximum possible capacity of air-to-surface weapons, none of the Phantoms had air-to-air missiles, leaving them essentially defenseless.

=== Dogfight ===
Due to the strengths of the AN/AWG-9 radar, the flight of Tomcats noticed that four fighters were headed toward the Phantoms at 40 miles. As the Phantoms did not have any missiles to protect themselves, Sultan-7, flown by Captain Sedqi, and Sultan-8, flown by Captain Tayebi, were ordered to protect them. The Tomcats moved to intercept, and climbed to 15,000 feet. They remained unnoticed, and thus climbed to 20,000 ft, and again to 22,000 ft.

Sultan-7 was equipped with two AIM-54 Phoenix, two AIM-9 Sidewinder, and three AIM-7 Sparrow missiles. Sultan-8 was equipped with two AIM-9 and six AIM-7s.

At 45 miles, the four fighters were recognized as Iraqi MiG-23s. Sultan-7 ordered both Tomcats to turn enable their electronic counter-countermeasures (ECCM). Sultan-7's system failed, leaving Sultan-8's systems to cover both aircraft. At 20 miles from the MiG-23s, Captain Sedqi told his RIO to prepare two AIM-54 Phoenix missiles.

The first missile launched, followed eight seconds later by the second. Upon impact, the first missile destroyed its target, while the second one appeared not to have scored a direct hit. The F-14's RIO later stated that it crippled the Iraqi aircraft. This was supported by Sultan-8, as well as a report which indicating that the warhead exploded either earlier or later than intended. Iraqi fighters, now noticing the Iranian aircraft, reduced their altitude, unintentionally making them easier targets for the Iranian aircraft.

With only 7 miles to the MiG-23s, Sultan-7 and 8 intended to fire simultaneously at the remaining MiGs, but Sultan-8's CSD system was not working, meaning he could not use his aircraft's missiles. This limitation restricted him to using this aircraft's M61 Vulcan cannon. Captain Sedqi of Sultan-7 told Sultan-8 to stay close to Sultan-9 and Sultan-10 and await his return. Sedqi then engaged the afterburner and the two MiG-23s split up, the leader going right and the follower going left.

Sedqi chased the leader and launched a Sparrow, which hit the tail. Seconds later, the aircraft's wing detached, and the aircraft hit the ground. The RIO then noticed that the other MiG-23 was approaching from their rear. Sedqi disengaged the afterburner, and performed a maneuver which reduced the aircraft's speed from 520 mph to 150 mph, giving the Tomcat a clear shot. It launched its second AIM-7, which hit the MiG-23's tail, sending it towards the ground. Its pilot ejected, and was the only crew member from the four MiG-23s who survived. One of the killed Iraqi pilots was Ahmad Sabah, who had shot down two Northrop F-5 of the IRIAF earlier in the war.
