= Jalil Zandi =

Iranian fighter pilot and flying ace

Timsar Jalil Zandi
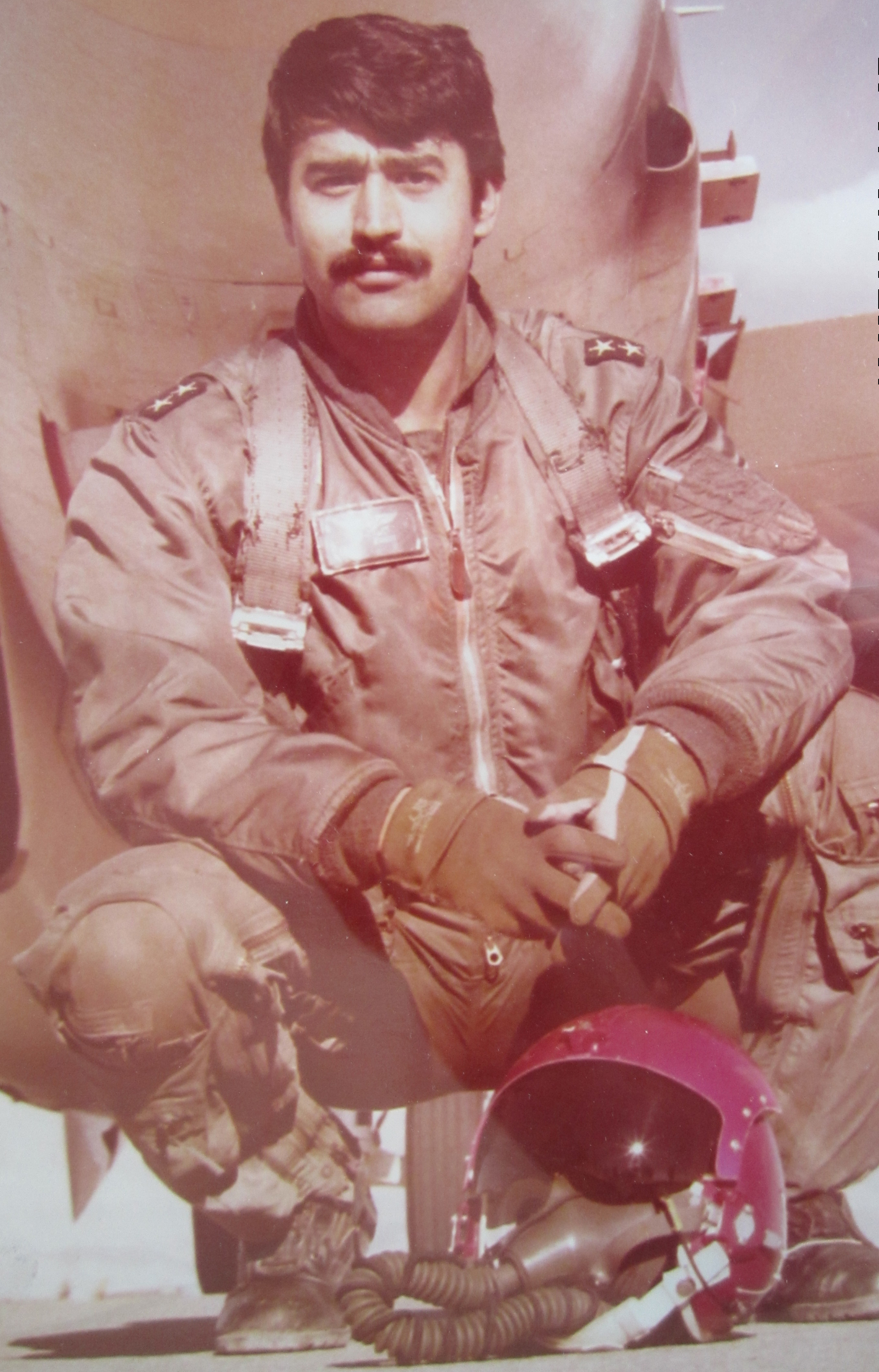
- Born: 2 May 1951; Garmsar, Imperial State of Iran
- Died: 1 April 2001 (aged 49); Tehran, Islamic Republic of Iran
- Burial place: Behesht-e Zahra cemetery, Tehran
- Spouse: Zahra Moheb Shahedin
- Military career
- Allegiance: Pahlavi Iran / Islamic Republic of Iran
- Branch: Imperial Iranian Air Force; Islamic Republic of Iran Air Force
- Service years: 1970–2001
- Rank: 2nd Brigadier General
- Conflicts: Iran–Iraq War
- Awards: Fath Medal (2nd grade)

Jalil Zandi (Persian: جلیل زندی; 1951–2001) was a fighter pilot in the Imperial Iranian Air Force and the Islamic Republic of Iran Air Force (IRIAF) who served during all of the Iran–Iraq War. His combat record qualifies him as one of the most successful pilots of that conflict in air-to-air combat, as well as one of the most successful Iranian aces ever. It also made him the most successful pilot in the history of the F-14 Tomcat.

== Career ==
Jalil Zandi began in the Imperial Iranian Air Force and after the 1979 Islamic revolution stayed on to serve in the IRIAF when it was somewhat dangerous for pilots to continue their military service. While a major, he often clashed with his superior Lieutenant Colonel Abbas Babaei. Abbas Babaei was "notorious for his merciless treatment of the pilots and officers" considered disloyal to the new regime and because of this, Jalil Zandi was condemned to ten years of imprisonment. While in prison, he was threatened with execution, but by demand of the then-air force commander and many other air force pilots, he was released after six months.

== Iran–Iraq War ==
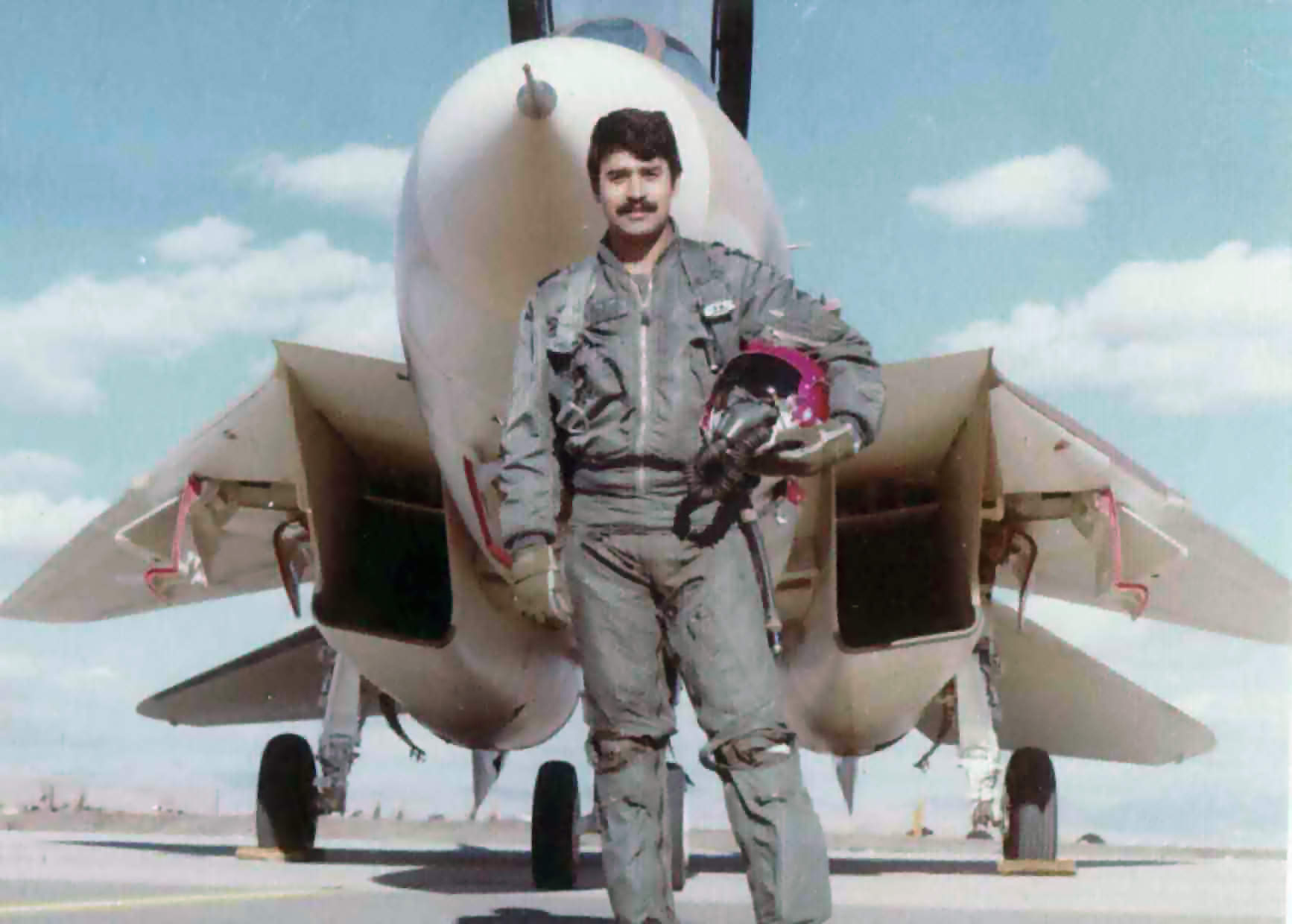
Zandi with an F-14 Tomcat

He earned his fame as an F-14 Tomcat pilot during the Iran–Iraq War. He has been credited with shooting down 11 Iraqi aircraft (eight confirmed victories through examination with US intelligence documents released according to FOIA inquiry and three probable victories). The victories include four MiG-23s, two Su-22s, two MiG-21s, and three Mirage F1s. This makes him one of the most successful Iranian fighter aces and the most successful F-14 Tomcat pilot worldwide, he also managed to defeat Mohammad Rayyan—Iraq's most skilled fighter pilot—in aerial combat.

== Post-war ==
His last official post was deputy for planning and organization of the Iranian Air Force.

He died with his wife Zahra Moheb Shahedin in 2001 in a car accident near Tehran. He is buried in Behesht-e Zahra cemetery in the south of Tehran. The couple had three sons: Vahid, Amir, and Nader.

== See also ==
- F-14 Tomcat operational history
- Iranian aerial victories during the Iran-Iraq war
- List of aces of aces
