= Islamic Republic of Iran Air Force =

Aerial service branch of the Islamic Republic of Iran Army

- نیروی هوایی ارتش جمهوری اسلامی ایران; Nirū-ye Havāyi-ye Arteš-e Jomhūri-ye Eslāmi-ye Irān
- The badge of the Islamic Republic of Iran Air Force
- Founded: 25 February 1925; 101 years ago; (as the Imperial Iranian Air Force); 11 February 1979; 47 years ago; (as the Islamic Republic of Iran Air Force)
- Country: Iran
- Type: Air force
- Role: Aerial warfare
- Size: 37,000 personnel (2024); 330–350 aircraft
- Part of: Islamic Republic of Iran Army
- Headquarters: Tehran
- Nicknames: Persian: تیزپروازان; "Fastflyers"
- Mottos: Persian: بلند آسمان جایگاه من است; "Skyhigh is my place"
- Colours: Ultramarine blue
- Anniversaries: 8 February (Air Force Day)
- Engagements: World War II; Anglo-Soviet invasion; Azerbaijan crisis; Battle of Nalos; Project Dark Gene; Joint Operation Arvand; Dhofar rebellion; Second Iraqi–Kurdish War; 1974–1975 Shatt al-Arab conflict; 1978 Iranian Chinook shootdown; 1982 Harmak incident; Iran–Iraq War; Syrian civil war; Iranian intervention in Syria; War in Iraq (2013–2017); Iranian intervention in Iraq; Twelve-Day War; 2026 Iran War

Commanders
- Commander-in-Chief: Supreme Leader Mojtaba Khamenei
- Commander of the Air Force: Brigadier General Bahman Behmard
- Deputy Commander: Brigadier General Ali-Akbar Talebzadeh
- Coordinating Deputy Commander: Brigadier General Masoud Jafari

Insignia
- Roundels

- Fin flash

- Flag

Aircraft flown
- Attack: F-4D/E, Su-24MK, F-5E/F, Saeqeh, HESA Karrar
- Electronic warfare: B707 Elint
- Fighter: F-14A, MiG-29A/UB, Mirage F1EQ4/EQ5/EQ6, F-7M
- Helicopter: CH-47, Bell 212, Bell 206
- Patrol: P-3F
- Reconnaissance: RF-4E; UAV: Kaman 22 (UAV), Kaman-12 (UAV), Mohajer-6 (UAV), Qods Mohajer
- Trainer: F-5A/B/Simorgh, PC-7, F33C, Fajr-3, FT-7, Mirage F1BQ, Yak-130, HESA Yasin
- Transport: C-130, IL-76, F27, Boeing 747, Boeing 707, Falcon 20, Falcon 50, JetStar, PC-6, Socata TB, HESA Simourgh

The Islamic Republic of Iran Air Force (IRIAF; Persian: نیروی هوایی ارتش جمهوری اسلامی ایران, romanized: Niruye Havâyiye Arteše Jomhuriye Eslâmiye Irân) is the aviation branch of the Islamic Republic of Iran Army. The present air force was created when the Imperial Iranian Air Force was renamed in 1979 following the Iranian Revolution. The IRIAF was heavily involved in the Iran–Iraq War, carrying out major operations like Operation Kaman 99, Operation Sultan 10, the H-3 airstrike, and the first attack on a nuclear reactor in history, Operation Scorch Sword.

After eight years of aerial combat in that conflict, the IRIAF has the second highest claimed number of fighter aces in the region, exceeded only by the Israeli Air Force; as many as seven IRIAF pilots claimed more than six kills, mostly achieved in the F-14 Tomcat. Veterans of the Iran–Iraq War formed the core of the IRIAF command. Due to its outdated equipment and lack of spare parts for its aircraft due to international sanctions, the IRIAF was unable to counter Israeli air strikes during the Twelve-Day War, with no reports of its fighter jets being deployed, which gave Israel air superiority over Iran.

During the 2026 Iran war, Iranian F-4E Phantom II, F-5E Tiger II, and Su-24MK attempted attacks on U.S. military bases in the region, including a successful strike on Camp Buehring in Kuwait, the first time in many years that a foreign fixed-wing aircraft struck a U.S. base. They used extremely low flying to increase survivability.

== History ==
In February 1979, the IRIAF came into being when the former Imperial Iranian Air Force (IIAF) was renamed following the Islamic Revolution in Iran. The date of renaming was 19 Bahman 1357.

This "new" Iranian air force largely inherited the equipment and structure of the former IIAF, losing most of its leading officers in the course of post-revolutionary chaos, as well as due to the prosecution of those considered as loyal to the Shah, pro-U.S. or elsewhere by the new government in Tehran.

Due to strained relations with the West, Iran had to procure new equipment from Brazil, the Soviet Union and the People's Republic of China. Since the Revolution, the exact composition of the IRIAF has been hard to determine. Many aircraft belonging to the Iraqi Air Force took refuge in Iran during the Gulf War in 1991, and many were put into service with the IRIAF or taken apart for spare parts.

Due to the continuous spare parts shortages faced by the air force, a decision was made in the late 1980s to develop a local aerospace industry to support the air force.

In 2002, Iran with the co-operation of Ukraine, successfully started the manufacture of the Iran-140, a licence-built version of the Antonov An-140 transport aircraft. Simultaneously, Iran began construction of two domestically produced fighters, upgraded using technology from the Grumman F-14 Tomcat and the F-5 Tiger II. The fighters have been named the Azarakhsh and the Shafaq.

Since then, Iran has also become self-sufficient in the manufacture of helicopters. Iran claims that it is capable of producing the U.S. AH-1 Cobra gunship. Iran produces Bell Helicopter Bell 212 and Bell 206 helicopters in serial production. These are known respectively as the Shabaviz 2-75 and the Shabaviz 206.

=== Iran–Iraq War (1980–1988) ===
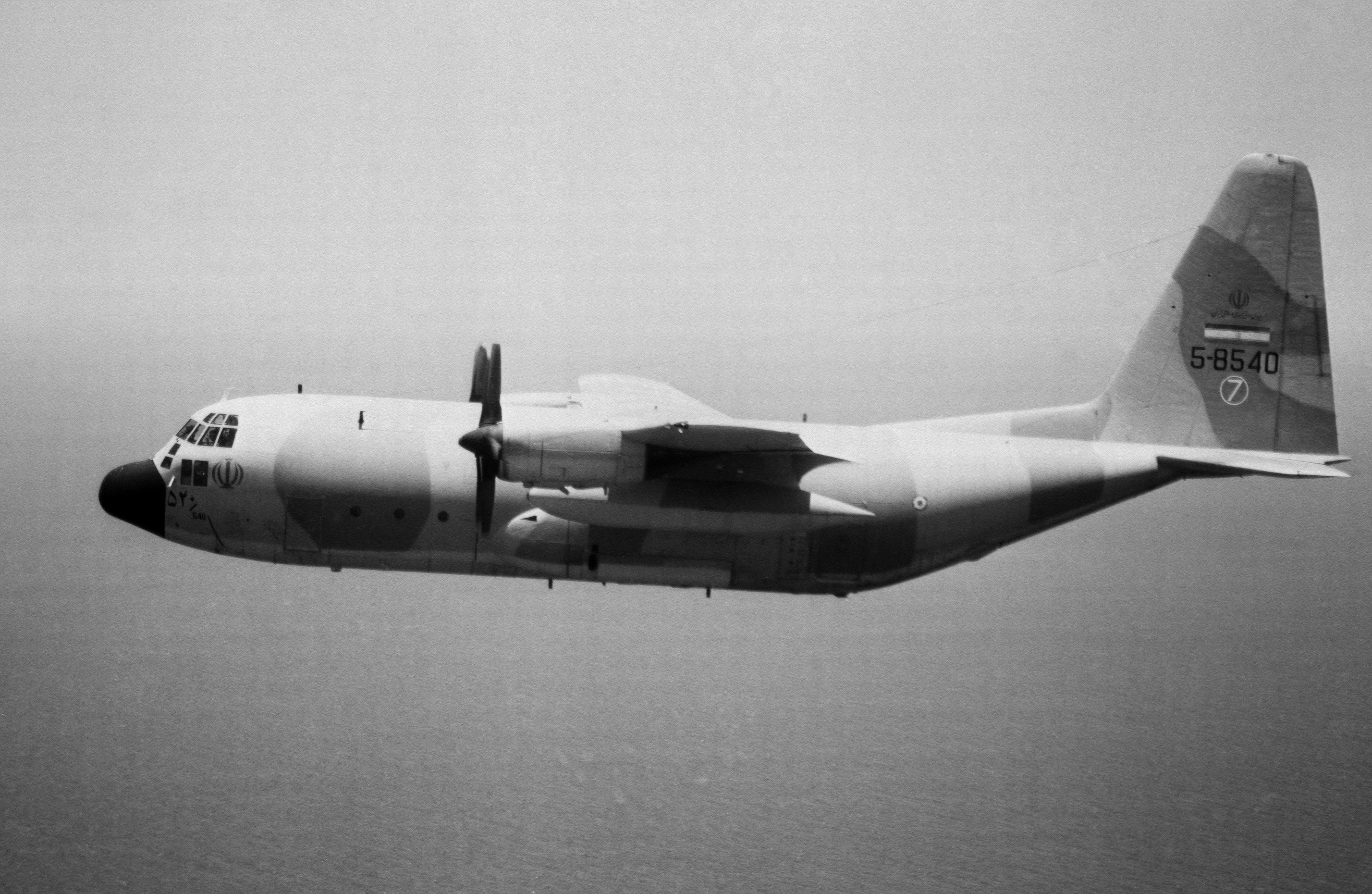
An IRIAF C-130 Hercules, 1988

A series of purges and forced retirements resulted in the manpower of the airforce being halved between February 1979 and July 1980, leaving the IRIAF ill-prepared for the Iran–Iraq War, also called the "1st Persian Gulf War". The sudden Iraqi air strikes against eight major Iranian airbases and four other military installations, launched on the afternoon of 22 September 1980, came as a complete surprise and caused a shock in the IRIAF.

On 23 September 1980, the Iranians retaliated with Operation Kaman 99, which involved 206 F-4, F-5 and F-14 aircraft. In that operation, 40 F-4 Phantoms, armed with Mark 82, Mark 83 and Mark 84 bombs and AGM-65 Maverick missiles, took off from Hamadan. After refueling mid-air, the Phantoms reached the Iraqi capital Baghdad, where they attacked the al-Rashid, al-Habbaniyah and al-Kut airbases. Meanwhile, eight more F-4s took off from Tehran and launched a second attack on the al-Rashid airbase.

Iran proceeded to launch 58 F-5E Tiger IIs from Tabriz, which were sent to attack Mosul Airbase. After the attack on Mosul Airbase, another 50 F-5Es were dispatched to strike Nasiriyah Airbase, which was heavily damaged.

As all 148 Iranian F-4s and F-5s had been sent for a bombing raid on Iraq, 60 F-14 Tomcats were scrambled to defend Iranian airspace against a possible Iraqi retaliation. Iranian F-14s managed to down two Iraqi MiG-21s (one MiG-21RF and one MiG-21MF) and three Iraqi MiG-23s (MiG-23MS). An Iranian F-5E also shot down an Iraqi Su-20 during the operation. Iraqi MiG-23s managed to down two F-5Es, while Iraqi MiG-21s downed two F-5Es. The Iraqis also shot down one of their own Il-76MD strategic airlifters with a SA-3 SAM.

The Iraqis were well prepared for the attack, and had flown most of their air force to other Arab countries, such as Saudi Arabia. This made sure that most of the Iraqi Air Force survived the operation.

Saddam Hussein and the Iraqi military were dealt a heavy blow when Iranian Air Force vulnerabilities failed to materialize. All Iraqi air bases' near Iran were out of order for weeks and, according to Iran, Iraq's aerial efficiency was reduced by 55%. This allowed Iranians to regroup and prepare for the upcoming Iraqi invasion.

Although the readiness rates of the IRIAF significantly increased in the following months, its overall role and influence declined, as the clerical government prioritized resources for the Islamic Revolutionary Guard Corps (IRGC) militias, and simultaneously attempted to develop a separate air arm for the IRGC.

Despite limitations and sanctions, the IRIAF achieved a successful kill rate in air-to-air combat against Iraqi jets. In air-to-air engagements, Iran's kill ratio was roughly 5:1, which was surpassed by the Israelis against Syria in 1982 and the US in the Gulf war in 1991. It got to the point where Iraq ordered its pilots to avoid air-to-air engagements, especially with the F-14.

After the successful liberation of most Iranian areas captured by the Iraqis in the first half of 1982, the situation of the IRIAF changed completely. From an air arm that was offensive by nature, it was largely relegated to air defense and relatively infrequent bombing attacks against targets of industrial and military significance inside Iraq. Simultaneously, the IRIAF had to learn how to maintain and keep operational its large fleet of U.S.-built aircraft and helicopters without outside help, due to American sanctions. Relying primarily on antiquated equipment purchased from the US in the 1970s, the Iranians began establishing their own aerospace industry.

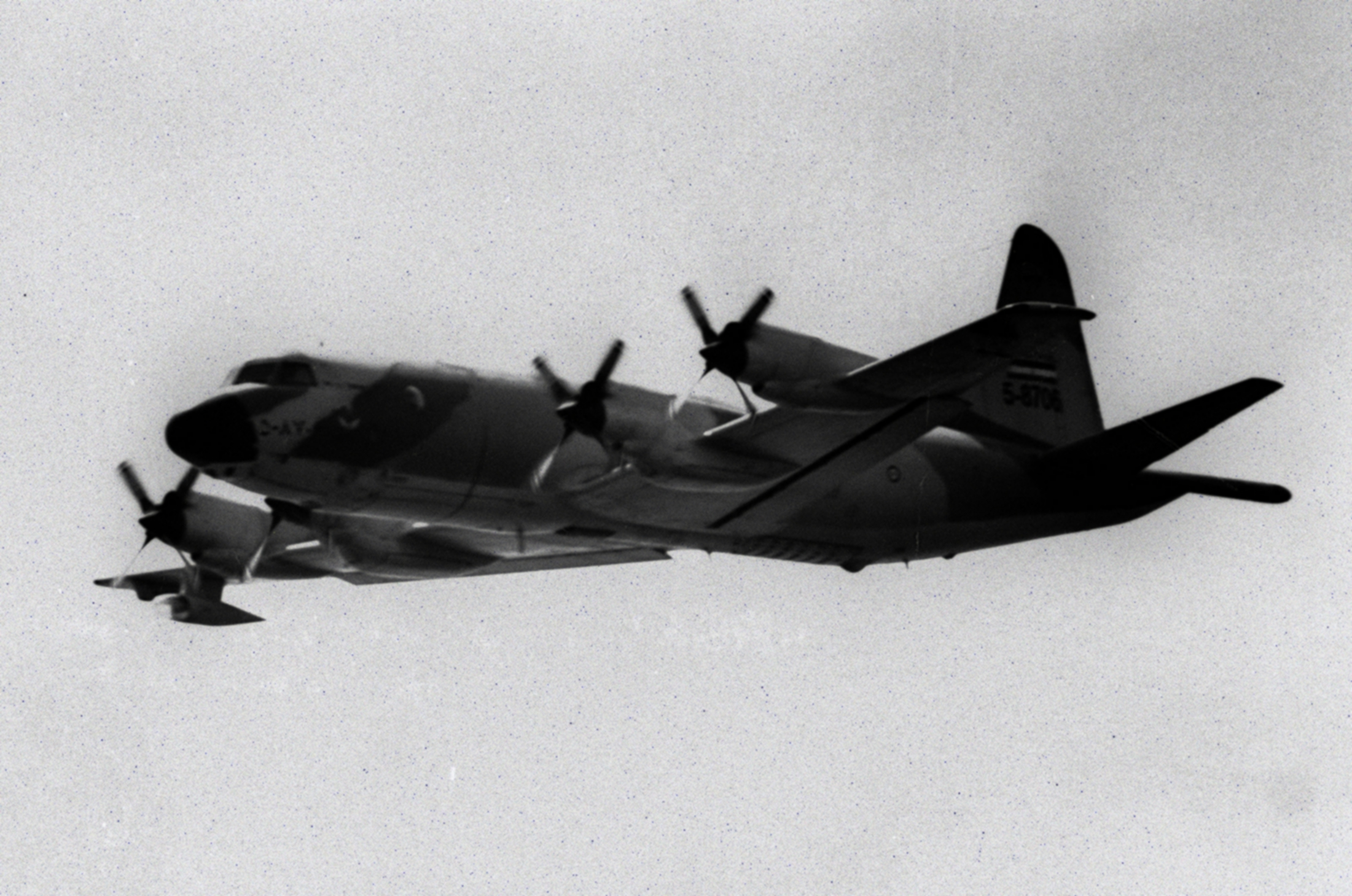
A P-3F Orion of the Islamic Republic of Iran Air Force

From 1984 and 1985, the IRIAF found itself confronted by an ever-better organized and equipped opponent, as the Iraqi Air force—reinforced by deliveries of advanced fighter-bombers from France and the Soviet Union—launched numerous offensives against Iranian air bases, military bases, industrial infrastructures, power plants, oil-export hubs, and population centers. These became better known as "The Tanker War" and "The War of the Cities".

To defend against an increasing number of Iraqi air strikes, the IRIAF leaned heavily on its large fleet of Grumman F-14 Tomcat interceptor fighters. Tomcats were mainly deployed in defense of the strategically important Khark Island, the main hub for Iranian oil exports, and Tehran. Over 300 air-to-air engagements against IQAF fighters, fighter-bombers, and bombers, were fought in these areas between 1980 and 1988.

Confronted with the fact that it could not obtain replacements for equipment lost in what became a war of attrition against Iraq, the IRIAF remained defense-orientated for the rest of the conflict, conserving its surviving assets as a "force in being". From mid 1987, the IRIAF found itself confronted with U.S. Navy fighters over the Persian Gulf. A number of confrontations between July 1987 and August 1988 stretched available IRIAF assets to the limit, exhausting its capability to defend Iranian air space against Iraqi air strikes.

With this brutal air fight during eight consecutive years, many Iranian fighter pilots claimed world records during the war, such as General Yadollah Khalili, who holds the worldwide record of the longest straight flight in a fighter plane, having flown an F-14 non-stop for eleven hours, aerial refuelling eight times during the process. Fereydoun Ali Mazandarani was the first pilot to aerial refuel an F-14 in a night environment.

As a result of this war, the IRIAF developed proven tactics and skillful battle tested pilots, becoming one of the most experienced air arms in the region. The most notable Iranian fighter pilots were Fereydoun Ali Mazandarani, Fazlollah Javidnia, Jalil Zandi and Shahram Rostami. Other notable pilots include, Hossein Khalatbari, Abbas Doran, Hassan Harandi, Abolfazl Mehreganfar, Ghafour Jeddi, Abbas Babaei and Ali Eghbali Dogahe among many others.

=== Post Iran–Iraq War ===
Military Ranks of the Iranian Army
Islamic Republic of Iran Army
Ground and Air Forces	Navy Forces
ArteshBod	DaryaBod
SepahBod	DaryaSalar
SarLashkar	DaryaBan
SarTip	DaryaDar I
SarTip Dovvom	DaryaDar II
SarHang	NaKhoda I
SarHang II	NaKhoda II
SarGord	NaKhoda III
SarVan	NavSarvan
SotVan I, II and III	Navban I, II and III
OsTovar I and II	NavOstovar I and II
GoroohBan I, II and III	MahNavy I, II and III
SarJookheh	SarNavy
SarBaz I and II	Navy I and II
SarBaz	Navy

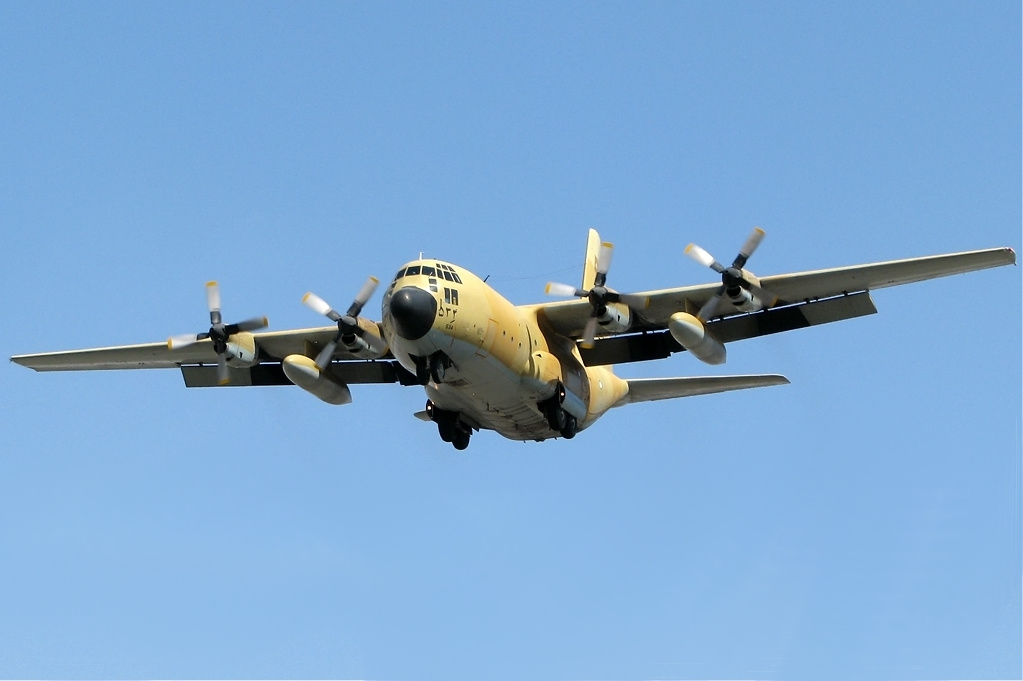
An Iranian C-130 Hercules, 2010

Immediately after the end of the Iran–Iraq War, the IRIAF was partially rebuilt through limited purchases of MiG-29 fighters and Su-24 bombers from the Soviet Union, and F-7M and FT-7 fighters from China. While providing needed reinforcement to the Iranian Air Force, these types never replaced the older, U.S.-built F-4 Phantoms, F-14s (the IRIAF is now the only air arm in the world using the fighter), or F-5s. Instead, the IRIAF continued its efforts to keep these types in service, and began a number of projects to refurbish and upgrade them.

=== 1990s ===
During the 1991 Persian Gulf War, numerous Iraqi pilots flew Iraqi Air Force aircraft to Iran to avoid destruction by coalition forces. The Iranians impounded these aircraft and never returned them, putting them in service in the IRIAF and claiming them as reparations for the Iran–Iraq War. The aircraft included several Mirage F1EQ, MiG-21PF, MiG-23BN, MiG-29A, Su-20s, Su-22M4, Su-24MK, Su-25K and a number of Il-76s, including the secret, one-off AEW-AWACS Il-76 "ADNAN 1" prototype.

Even after the cease-fire with Iraq, the IRIAF carried out several air raids against Kurdish bases in northern Iraq. The first raid was conducted using eight F-4s armed with rockets and cluster bombs on 6 April 1992 against People's Mujahedin of Iran's Camp Ashraf. During this event one F-4 was shot down by either insurgent or Iraqi military AAA. Both pilots, Lt. Col Amini and Cpt. Sharifi, were captured, and freed in 1998. Despite threats of response, Iraq was not able to retaliate due to its own fight against Kurdish separatist guerrillas and the Western-imposed no-fly zones that crippled and limited its air force's operations.

In 2007, Iraq asked Iran to return some of the scores of Iraqi fighter planes that flew there ahead of the Gulf War in 1991. In 2014, Iran was receptive to the demands and was working on refurbishing an unspecified number of jets. In late 2014, Iran returned 130 military aircraft to Iraq.

=== 2000s ===
In 2006, after Iranian media published a series of reports suggesting that Venezuela was interested in selling its 21 F-16 Fighting Falcons to Iran, a Hugo Chavez adviser confirmed to the Associated Press that "Venezuela's military is considering selling its fleet of U.S.-made F-16 fighter jets to another country, possibly Iran, in response to a U.S. ban on arms sales to President Hugo Chávez's government". In response, Sean McCormack, a U.S. State Department spokesperson, warned Venezuela that "without the written consent of the United States, Venezuela can't transfer these defense articles, and in this case F-16s, to a third country".

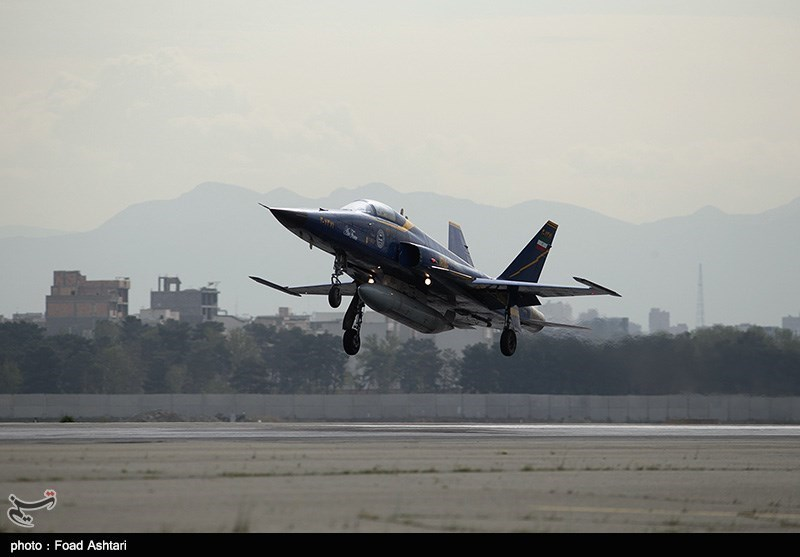
Iranian Air Forces training in Tehran, 2014

According to Moscow Defense Brief, Russia delivered 6 Su-25UBK ground attack fighter-trainers, 12 Mi-171Sh military transport helicopters, 21 Mi-171 transport helicopters, and 3 Mi-17B-5 medical helicopters to Iran between 2000 and 2006. A $700 million repair and modernization program of the IRIAF MiG-29 and Su-24 fighters was also completed.

On 22 September 2009, an IRIAF Il-76 collided with an F-5E shortly after an annual parade in Tehran and crashed near Varamin, killing all seven people on board.

=== 2010s ===
At the end of 2014, there was evidence that the IRIAF was involved in the 2014 military intervention against the Islamic State of Iraq and the Levant. A video released by Aljazeera seemed to show an Iranian F-4 Phantom II bombing some ISIS buildings in Diyala Governorate.

On August 26, 2018, an F-5F crash-landed near Dezful, killing the pilot and injuring the co-pilot.

On 25 December 2019, an MiG-29 crashed in the Sabalan mountains.

=== 2020s ===
The IRIAF air fleet is aging, some aircraft are more than 40 years old, and this has led to several crashes. In June 2021, another F-5F crashed near Dezful, killing both crew. In February 2022, a F-5F crashed into a school in Tabriz, killing both crew and a person on the ground. In May 2022, two Chinese-built Chengdu J-7 crashed east of Isfahan, killing the pilots.

Since the Russian invasion of Ukraine in February 2022, Iran and Russia have formed closer relations, with Iran supplying Russia with loitering munitions such as the HESA Shahed 136. Subsequently, Russia has begun to supply Iran with more advanced weapon systems, namely the Yakovlev Yak-130 jet trainer, with the first two delivered in September 2023.

==== Iran–Israel War ====
Due to ageing and outdated equipment, the IRIAF was unable to counter the Israeli Air Force (IAF) during the June 2025 Twelve-Day War, enabling the IAF to achieve air superiority over Iran; there was no sign that IRIAF fighter jets even left the ground. Initial waves of airstrikes by the Israeli Air Force reportedly destroyed two parked F-14 Tomcats, while another Israeli airstrike the following week destroyed three more parked F-14s, according to Israeli sources. The Israel Defense Forces (IDF) produced evidence that it destroyed what was reportedly the IRIAF's sole operable aerial tanker, a KC-707 parked at Mashhad Shahid Hasheminejad International Airport, about 2,250 km (1,400 mi) from Israel; this is possibly the farthest strike ever undertaken by the IDF. An expert interviewed by The New York Times said that the destruction of the tanker would have little immediate effect because the IRIAF had not recently been conducting aerial refueling.

On 22 June 2025, the United States conducted airstrikes against Iranian nuclear facilities using multiple B-2 Spirit bombers of the United States Air Force and Tomahawk missiles launched from an unnamed United States Navy submarine. No response by the IRIAF was detected, US officials said.

=== 2026 ===
==== 2026 Iran war ====
On March 1, 2026, the Israeli Air Force (IAF) destroyed two IRIAF fighters, an F-5 and an F-4 Phantom II at Tabriz Shahid Madani International Airport in northeast Iran.

On March 2, 2026, the US Central Command released footage of the destruction of two IRGC-AF Su-22 "Fitter" on the ground.

On 2 March 2026, two Iranian low-flying Su-24 tactical bombers (carrying external weapons) were targeting Al-Udeid Air Base and Ras Laffan Industrial City during the 2026 Iran war. After they did not respond to radio warnings, a Qatari Emiri Air Force F-15QA shot them down. This marked the first aerial kills achieved by the Qatar Emiri Air Force. The body of one of the pilots of a Su-24, named Brigadier General Majid Kazemi was found and identified via DNA analysis on 29 July 2026 and is said to be returned to Iran.

On 4 March 2026, an Iranian Yakovlev Yak-130 was shot down by an Israeli Lockheed Martin F-35 Lightning II over Tehran in air-to-air combat. The fate of the two Iranian pilots remained unknown.

NBC also reported that an Iranian F-5 was able to bomb a U.S airbase in Kuwait.

== Structure ==
Note: former outdated Jane's Sentinel estimate of units 1993 data (Source: Jane's Sentinel, Islamic Republic of Iran, 1993, – not complete) has now been replaced by newer 2019 data.

The IRIAF's composition has changed very little since 1979. There were limited relocations and unit disbandments in the late 1980s (F-4D/E and F-14 fleet at Shiraz and Mehrabad). Deployments during the war with Iraq were mainly temporary. In 1985, a major reorganization of existing air-defense SAM and AAA units took place. There were not any major reorganizations in the 1990s.

Iranian airforce equipment, capabilities, and performance strongly influenced the development of the Iraqi Air Force (IQAF) in the 1980s, and the United Arab Emirates Air Force in the 1990s.

In 2013, the Iranian authorities changed their command structure, relating to tactical air bases, military installations, and civil airports. Almost all airfields previously designated as being of some strategic importance for contingency scenarios, have now been made suitable for combined military and civilian usage.

This is in accordance with the IRIAF operating small composite units spread out all over Iran, easy to relocate at very short notice, instead of the former, large fixed-based units. All dual-use airfields have basic cross-service capabilities to handle all IRIAF aircraft. The main facilities for logistics and technical overhaul remain concentrated at some larger airfields.

Iran has been under sanctions since 1979, with Iran servicing and overhauling its own military and civilian aircraft. In 2015, less tension in international relations led to a decrease in the sanctions, and the Iranian government was able to order a new fleet of civilian aircraft, replacing the aged types.

=== Jane's 360 military capabilities assessment 2019 ===
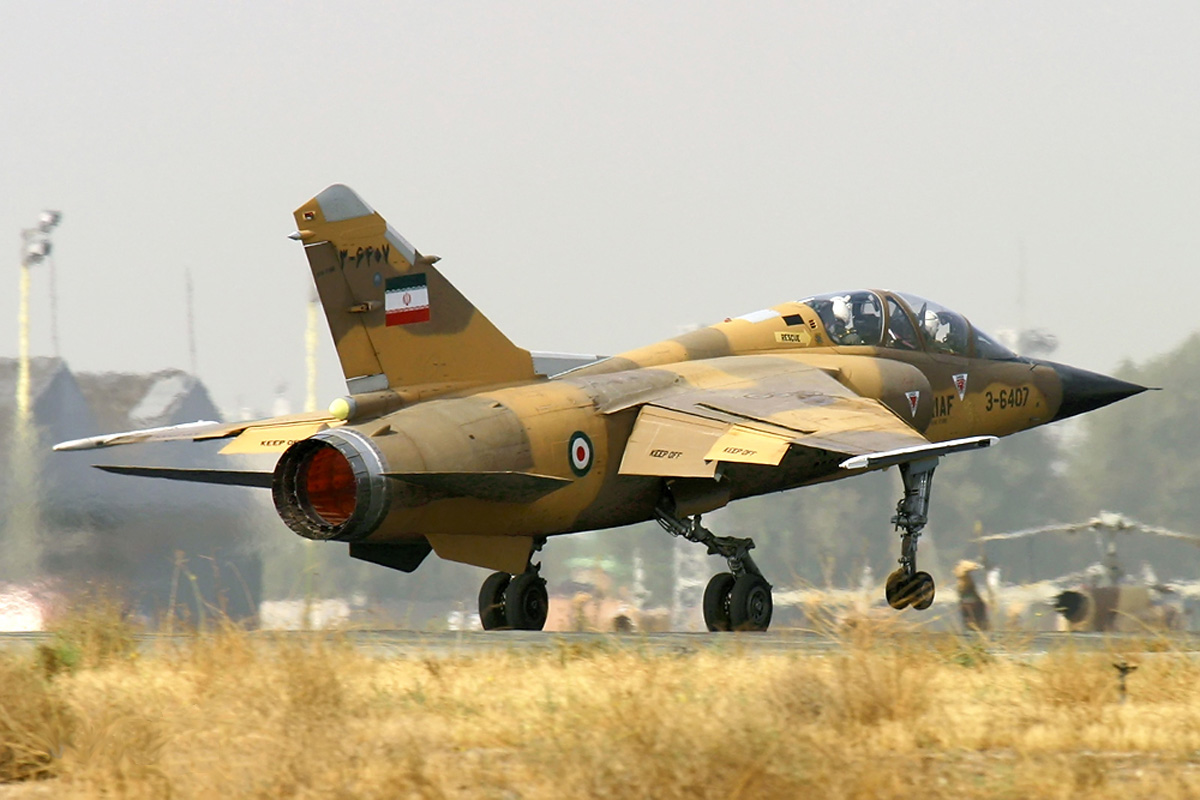
A Mirage F1BQ landing

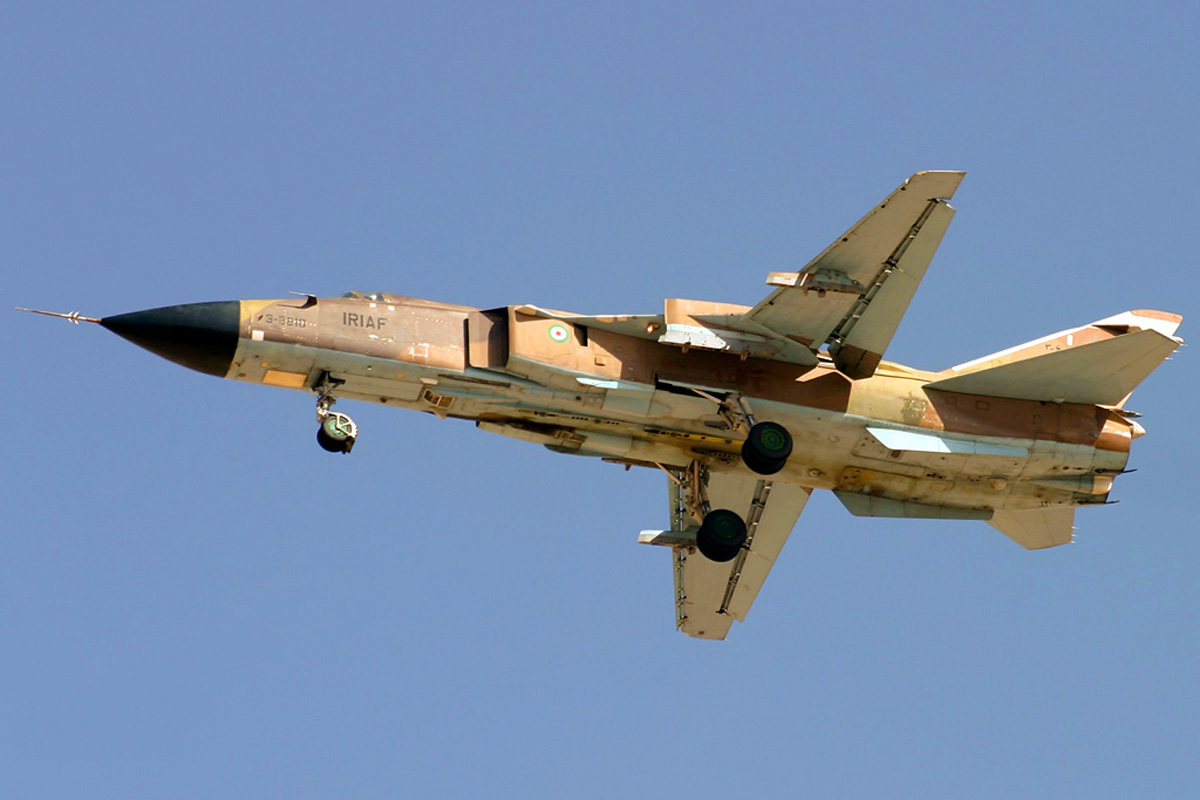
An Su-24MK of the IRIAF flying over Shahid Dastghaib International Airport

Name	Usage	Location	Aircraft
Ahmadi	Reserve airfield	29°05′57″N 51°02′07″E	none
Araz	Reserve airfield	39°06′40″N 45°20′02″E	none
Bandar Abbas	Combined Mil/Civ airfield	27°13′05″N 56°22′40″E	Composite unit F-4 Phantom II; F-7 Airguard
Bandar e Jask	Combined Mil/Civ airfield	25°39′11″N 57°47′51″E	Maritime patrol flight Lockheed P-3F Orion
Birjand	Combined Mil/Civ airfield	32°53′53″N 59°15′58″E	Unknown composite unit
Bishe Kola	Combined Mil/Civ airfield	36°39′18″N 52°20′58″E	HESA Shahed 278 light utility helicopter flight
Bushehr	Combined Mil/Civ airfield	28°56′41″N 50°50′04″E	Composite unit F-4;Grumman F-14 Tomcat; UAV's
Chahbahar	Combined Mil/Civ airfield	25°26′41″N 60°22′55″E	Composite unit Dassault Mirage F1; F-4
Darrahi	Reserve airfield	29°22′33″N 51°04′03″E	none
Dezful	Combined Mil/Civ	32°25′57″N 48°24′07″E	Composite unit Northrop F-5; F-7 Airguard
Firuzabad	Army aviation base	35°31'43"N 51°30'26"E	Composite helicopter unit Shahed 278
Gorreh	Reserve airfield	29°54′25″N 50°25′43″E	none
Hamadan	Combined Mil/Civ airfield	35°12′37″N 48°39′12″E	Composite unit F-4; F-7
Hesa	Aircraft manufacturer	32°55′44″N 51°33′40″E	tech/log/maintenance plant
Isfahan / Badr	Army aviation; tech overhaul base	32°37′16″N 51°41′49″E	Composite helicopter units
Isfahan / international	Combined Mil/Civ	32°45'10"N 51°52'44"E	Composite unt F-14; Mikoyan MiG-29
Isfahan / Sahid Vatanpour	Army aviation; logistics base	32°34′09″N 51°41′12″E	Composite helicopter unit
Kashan	Combined Mil/Civ airfield	33°53′43″N 51°34′37″E	Composite fighter flights
Kerman	Airbase	30°15′57″N 56°57′34″E	Composite fighter/attack aircraft
Kermanshah	Airbase	34°20′45″N 47°09′29″E	Composite unit Sukhoi Su-24; Sukhoi Su-25
Kharg Island	Combined Mil/Civ airfield	26°31′33″N 53°58′52″E	Composite unit Antonov An-74; Harbin Y-12 aircraft; Mil Mi-17 helicopters; UAV's
Kish	Airbase	26°31′33″N 53°58′52″E	Composite fighter unit
Manzariyeh	Army aviation base	34°59′02″N 50°48′22″E	Embraer EMB 312 Tucano trainer/light attack
Mashhad	Combined Mil/Civ airfield	36°14′07″N 59°38′38″E	Composite unit F-4; F-5
Masjed Soleyman	Airbase	31°59′58″N 49°16′16″E	Composite unit F-14; F-4
Mehrshahr	Training base	35°46′34″N 50°52′51″E	Training Pilatus PC-6 Porter; Embraer 312
Omidiyeh	Combined Mil/Civ airfield	30°49′51″N 49°32′35″E	Unknown composite units
Shiraz	Combined Mil/Civ airfield; logistics; tech overhaul	29°32′11″N 52°35′18″E	Composite unit Ilyushin Il-76 airlift; P-3F maritime patrol; Su-24 attack; Bell 214 light utility
Soga	Combined Mil/Civ airfield	37°37′40″N 56°10′23″E	Composite airlift unit Lockheed C-130H Hercules; Boeing 707
Tabriz	Combined Mil/Civ airfield	38°07′44″N 46°14′24″E	Composite unit F-5; F-14; Boeing CH-47 Chinook
Tehran / Doshan Tappeh	Training/logistics base	35°42'00"N 51°28'22"E	Training/conversion Chengdu F-7; Northrop F-5B; Mirage F-1BQ
Tehran / Ghale Morghi	Closed	35°38′41″N 51°22′51″E	None
Tehran / Mehrabad	Combined Mil/Civ airfield; logistics; tech overhaul	35°41′19″N 51°18′46″E	Composite unit MiG-29; Su-24; Boeing 707; C-130; Fokker F27 Friendship; CH-47
Urmia	Combined Mil/Civ airfield	37°40′15″N 45°04′19″E	Composite unit helicopter / transporter aircraft
Zahedan	Combined Mil/Civ airfield	29°28′29″N 60°54′22″E	Composite unit F-4; F-5; Su-24

A 1993 Jane's Sentinel report listed Iran's air bases and the types of aircraft stationed at each. Mehrabad (TAB 1) was the largest, hosting a mix of fighters (F-5, F-7, F-14, MiG-29), transport planes (C-130, Il-76), and commercial jets. Other major bases included Tabriz, Shiraz, Isfahan, and Bandar Abbas, each with squadrons of U.S.- and Chinese-made fighter jets and transport aircraft. Some bases, like Ghale Morghi (TAB 11), were used for pilot training. Many aircraft types were spread across bases, including older F-4 Phantoms, F-5s, F-7s, and transport planes like the C-130.

== Commanders ==
- Reza Mizani (June 1923 – 1 June 1924)
- Ahmad Nakhjavan (1 June 1924 – 17 August 1930)
- Ahmad Mirza-Khosravani (17 August 1930 – 30 December 1930)
- Ahmad Nakhjavan (30 December 1930 – 29 June 1931)
- Ahmad Mirza-Khosravani (29 June 1931 – 28 July 1931)
- Mohammad Sadegh Koupal (28 July 1931 – 17 December 1932)
- Ahmad Nakhjavan (17 December 1932 – 21 December 1936)
- Ahmad Mirza-Khosravani (21 December 1936 – 31 August 1941)
- Karim Buzarjomehri (31 August 1941 – 22 November 1941) (acting)
- Abdul-Majid Firouz (12 January 1942 – 27 August 1942)
- Mohammad Nakhjavan (27 August 1942 – 12 December 1942)
- Sharafeddin Ghahremani (12 December 1942 – 18 January 1943)
- Abdul-Majid Firouz and Mir-Mohammad Mohanna (co-commanders) (18 January 1943 – 15 May 1943)
- Ahmad Nakhjavan (15 May 1943 – 4 July 1943)
- Mir-Mohammad Mohanna (4 July 1943 – 14 September 1943)
- Mohammad Hossein Mirza Firouz (14 September 1943 – 27 June 1944)
- Ahmad Nakhjavan (27 June 1944 – 1944)
- Mohammad-Hossein Amidi (14 April 1946 – 8 September 1947)
- Hedayatollah Gilanshah (8 September 1947 – 30 March 1948)
- Mir-Mohammad Mohanna (30 March 1948 – 20 January 1949)
- Mehdi Sepahpour (20 January 1949 – 25 October 1950)
- Nouri Alaei (25 October 1950 – 30 July 1951)
- Mehdi Sepahpour (30 July 1951 – 5 February 1952)
- Hedayatollah Gilanshah (5 February 1952 – 3 March 1953)
- Mohammad Moeini (3 March 1953 – 20 March 1954)
- Hedayatollah Gilanshah (20 March 1954 – 7 October 1958)
- Mohammad Amir Khatami (7 October 1958 – 12 September 1975)
- Fazael Tadayon (12 September 1975 – 8 February 1977)
- Amir Hossein Rabii (8 February 1977 – 11 February 1979)
- Kiumars Saghafi (11 February 1979 – 12 February 1979)
- Saeed Mehdiyoun (12 February 1979 – 16 February 1979) (acting)
- Shapour Azarbarzin (16 February 1979 – 25 February 1979)
- Asghar Imanian (25 February 1979 – 12 August 1979)
- Abolfazl Mostafavi (12 August 1979 – 20 August 1979) (acting)
- Amir-Bahman Bagheri (20 August 1979 – July 1980)
- Javad Fakoori (July 1980 – 29 September 1981)
- Mohammad-Hossein Moeinpour (2 October 1981 – 25 November 1983)
- Houshang Seddigh (25 November 1983 – 30 January 1986)
- Mansour Sattari (30 January 1986 – 5 January 1995)
- Habib Baghaei (5 January 1995 – 27 May 2001)
- Reza Pardis (27 May 2001 – 14 October 2004)
- Karim Qavami (14 October 2004 – 27 October 2006)
- Ahmad Meyghani (27 October 2006 – 31 August 2008)
- Hassan Shahsafi (31 August 2008 – 19 August 2018)
- Aziz Nasirzadeh (19 August 2018 – 19 September 2021)
- Hamid Vahedi (19 September 2021 – 17 December 2025)
- Bahman Behmard (17 December 2025 – present)

== Aircraft ==
=== Gallery ===
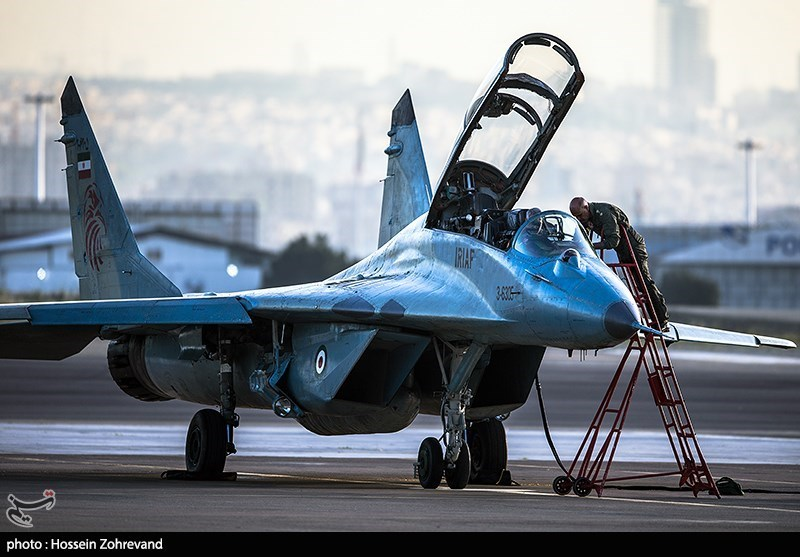
Iranian air force MiG-29 preparing for annual parade in 2019

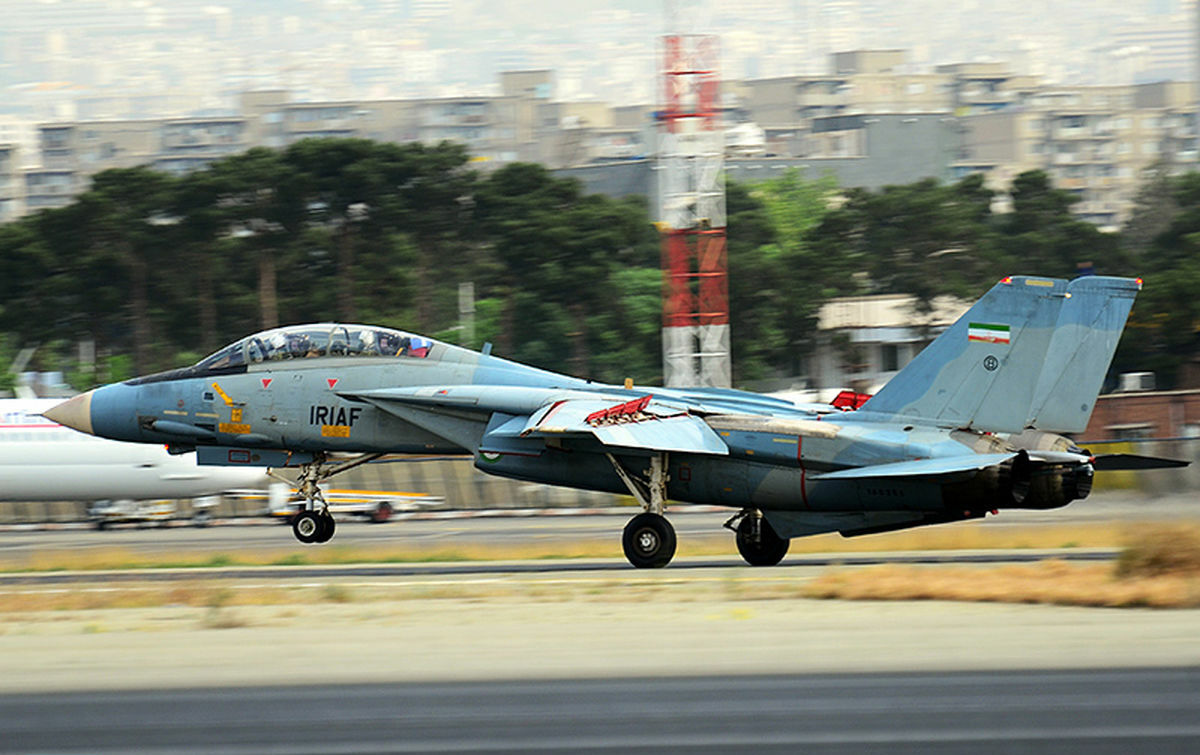
F-14 Tomcat at Mehrabad preparing for Iranian Army Day 2013

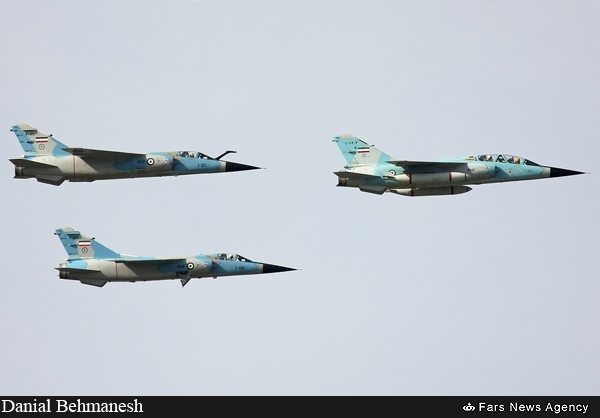
Dassault Mirage F1 in Iranian service

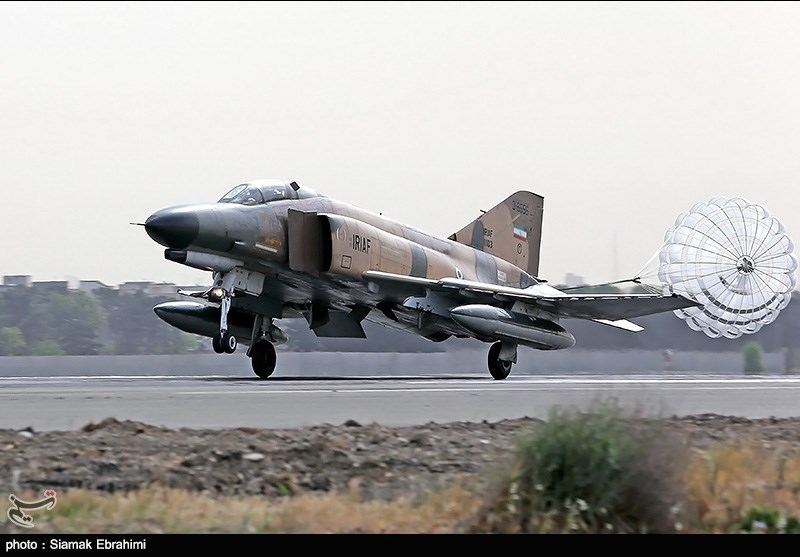
Iranian F-4 Phantom II

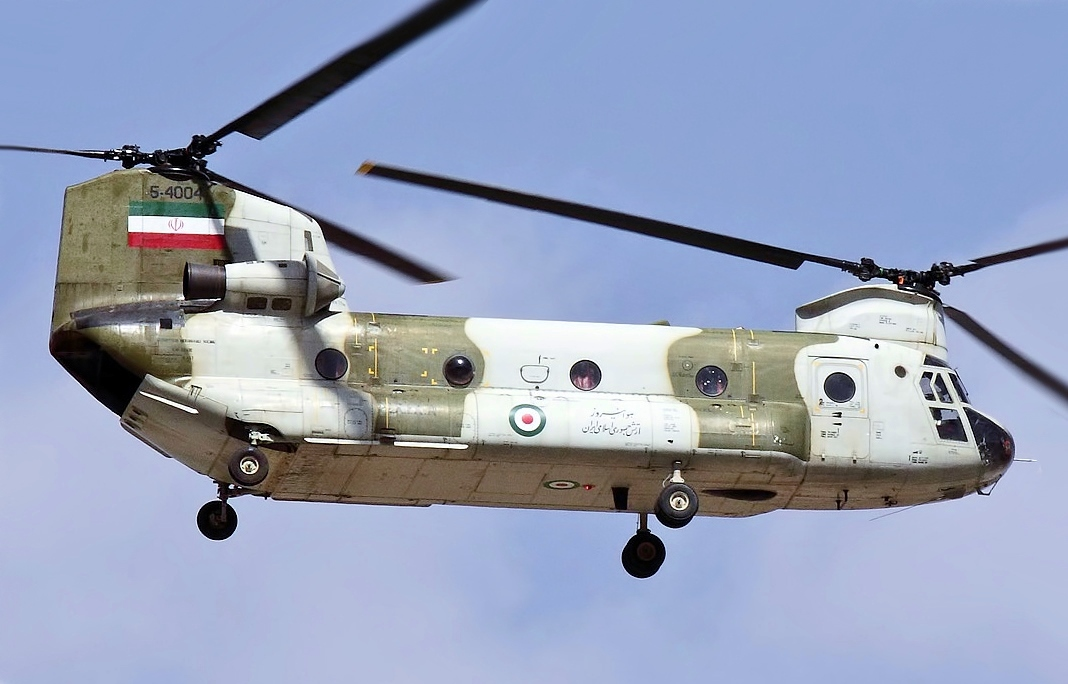
An Iranian CH-47C Chinook

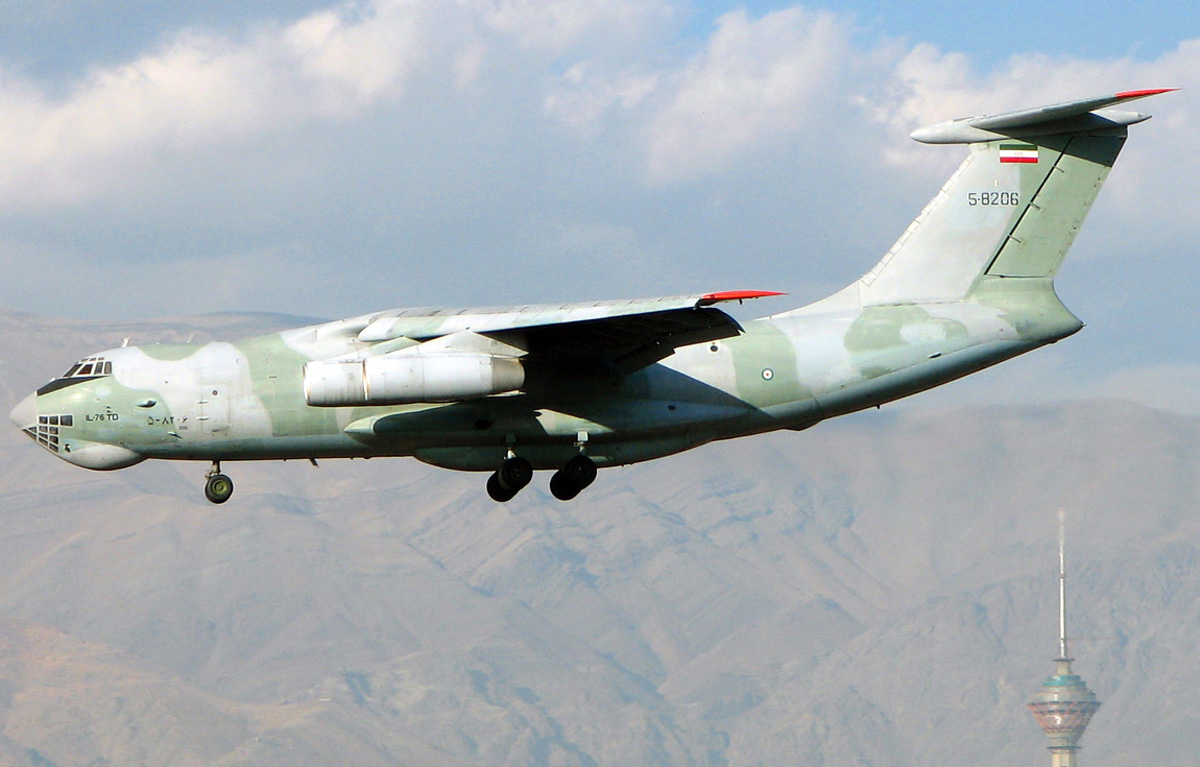
An Ilyushin Il-76TD of IRIAF landing.

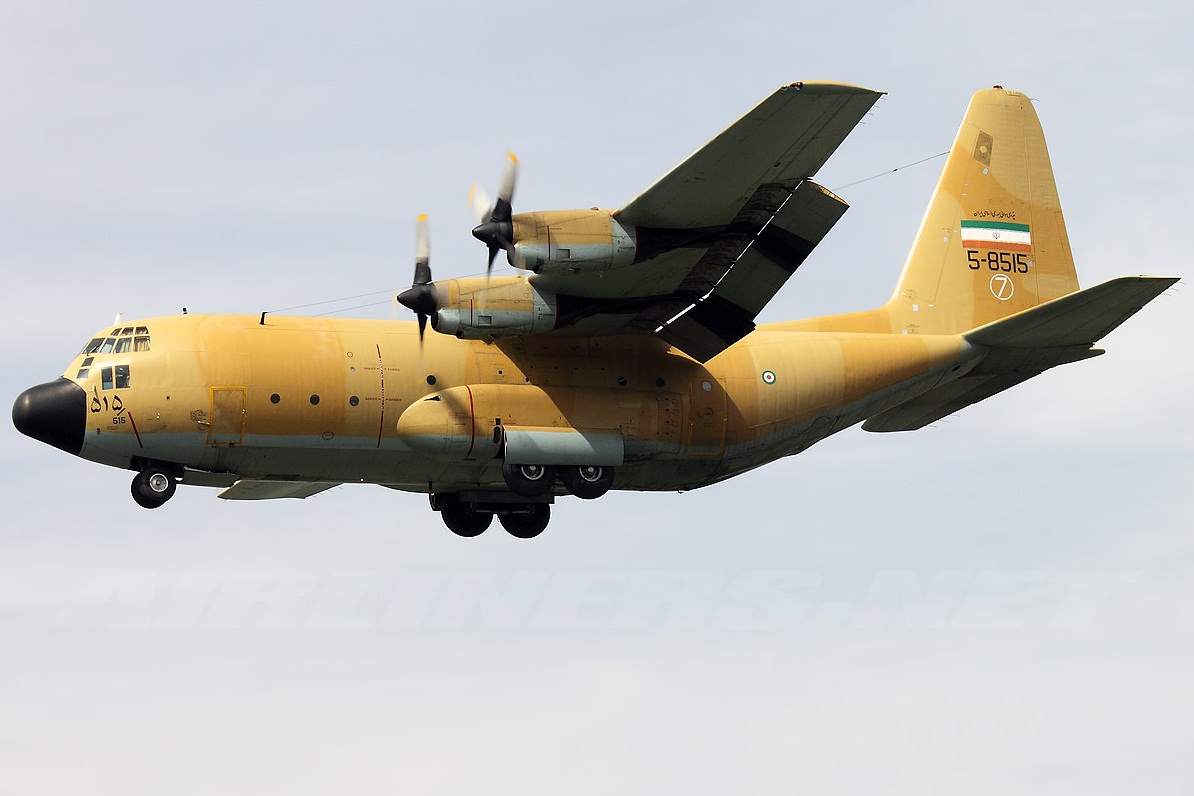
An Iranian C-130E

=== Iraqi aircraft return requests ===
In 2007, Iraq asked Iran to return some of the scores of Iraqi fighter planes that flew there ahead of the Gulf War in 1991. In 2014, Iran was receptive to the demands and was working on refurbishing an unspecified number of jets. In late 2014, Iran returned 130 military aircraft to Iraq. Including Sukhoi Su-25K ground attack jets.

== Accidents and incidents ==
- For accidents and incidents during the Twelve-Day War, see List of aviation shootdowns and accidents during the Twelve-Day War.
- On 19 February 2026 a McDonnell Douglas F-4 Phantom of IRIAF crashed. 1 person died (Brigadier General Mehdi Firoozmand) and the aircraft was destroyed.
- For accidents and incidents during the 2026 Iran war, see List of aviation shootdowns and accidents during the 2026 Iran war.

== Reported future expansion plans ==
In October 2020, a 13-year long UN arms embargo imposed on Iran was lifted. However, the poor state of Iran's finances and the threat of American sanctions on those trading with Iran made it unlikely that Tehran would make large foreign orders for military equipment. In November 2023, deputy defense minister Mehdi Farahi said that plans had been finalized for the Iranian armed forces to receive Sukhoi Su-35s, Yakovlev Yak-130s and Mil Mi-28s.

There have been reports that the IRIAF would be interested in the following aircraft for its modernization program:

- Su-30: In 2007, it was reported that Israeli defense officials were investigating a potential Iran–Russia deal, in which Iran would pay $1 billion for a dozen squadrons' worth of Su-30 jets. Iran and Russia have both denied this and have rejected these claims as propaganda. The purchase of this fighter would improve Iranian air force capability significantly, as it would be able to cover almost the entire Middle East from Iranian territory.
- Su-35: In 2016, Iran was reportedly interested in this aircraft in order to obtain a crucial edge over its potential rivals in the region.
- J-10: In 2007, the Russian news agency Novosti reported that Iran had signed a deal with China to buy two squadrons/24 of J-10 fighter planes, with Russian-made AL-31FN engines. The total cost of the planes is estimated at $1 billion, and deliveries are expected between 2008 and 2010. China denied that it had agreed to sell its home-grown fighter jets to Iran, saying no talks had taken place. Foreign Ministry spokesman Liu Jianchao told reporters: "It's not true, it is an irresponsible report, China has not had talks with Iran on J-10 jets." In 2025, after the Iran–Israel war, the Iranian air force pushed to acquire the Chinese J-10C instead of the Russian Sukhoi Su-35 due to delays in its delivery by Russia and due to the J-10C's performance in the 2025 India–Pakistan conflict.

== Facilities ==
The location of major air bases in Iran

In the last several years several new airfields have been constructed in central- and eastern Iran. Some of these facilities have since seen full-scale deployments of IRIAF units, and it now appears that at least two became permanent "Tactical Fighter Bases" (TFBs). These are the first such bases established since 1979.

Except new airfields, with Chinese support, the IRIAF constructed a number of new early warning radar sites around Iran. Its ability to control the national airspace remains limited—mainly due to the rugged terrain and lack of airborne early warning assets.

Aside from maintaining 17 TFBs, the IRIAF operates numerous temporary detachments on several minor airfields around Iran. Ex-Iraqi Mirage F.1EQs, usually based at TFB.14, near Mashhad, were frequently seen over the Persian Gulf in 2005 and 2006.

== Major operations ==
- Iran–Iraq War
  - Operation Kaman 99, Iran's biggest air raid during the Iran–Iraq war, with a strength of more than 140 aircraft.
  - Operation Scorch Sword, a 1980 Iranian airstrike on an Iraqi nuclear reactor under construction.
  - H-3 airstrike, The IRIAF's boldest operation in Iraq.
  - Operation Morvarid, a successful joint operation by the IRIAF and the Islamic Republic of Iran Navy in the Persian Gulf against the Iraqi Air Force and Navy.
  - Operation Sultan 10, an operation to disrupt delivery of new French fighter planes to the Iraqi Air force and the associated training of personnel, during the Iran–Iraq war.

== Ranks ==
=== Commissioned officer ranks ===
The rank insignia of commissioned officers.

Rank group	General / flag officers					Senior officers			Junior officers
Iranian Air Force
Iranian Air Force	ارتشبد; Arteshbod	سپهبد; Sepahbod	سرلشکر; Sarlashkar	سرتیپ; Sartip	سرتیپ دوم; Sartip dovom	سرهنگ; Sarhang	سرهنگ دوم; Sarhang dovom	سرگرد; Sargord	سروان; Sarvān	ستوان یکم; Sotvān yekom	ستوان دوم; Sotvān dovom	ستوان سوم; Sotvān sevom

=== Other ranks ===
The rank insignia of Iranian non-commissioned officers and enlisted personnel.

Rank group	Senior NCOs					Junior NCOs		Enlisted
Iranian Air Force
Iranian Air Force	استوار یکم; Ostovar yekom	استوار دوم; Ostovar dovom	گروهبان یکم; Goruhban yekom	گروهبان دوم; Goruhban dovom	گروهبان سوم; Goruhban sevom	سرجوخه; Sarjukheh	سرباز یکم; Sarbaz yekom	سرباز دوم; Sarbaz dovom	سرباز; Sarbaz

== See also ==
- Air force history of Iran
- F-14 Tomcat operational history
- Iranian aerial victories during the Iran–Iraq war
- Iraqi aerial victories during the Iran–Iraq war
