= Pierre Razoux =

French writer and historian (born 1966)

- Born: 1966 (age 59–60)
- Education: Doctor of Military History; Law Expert; History field Expert; International Politics Expert
- Occupations: Historian; Writer; French Senior Civil Servant; servant of the Delegation for Strategic Affairs of the French Ministry of Defence; servant of the Policy Division of the British Ministry of Defence as an exchange officer

Pierre Razoux (born 1966) is a French writer and historian. A senior civil servant and Doctor of Military History, he is in charge of the Mediterranean Dialogue and the Istanbul Cooperation Initiative. Razoux served previously in the Delegation for Strategic Affairs of the French Ministry of Defence as well as served in the Policy Division of the British Ministry of Defence as an exchange officer. He has a long experience in the field of international affairs and defence, particularly on Northern African, Middle Eastern, Caucasian, NATO and European matters.

== Career ==
He is a specialist on the Middle East, a well-known lecturer and researcher who published 7 books and more than 90 academic articles. He has practical experience on the field, in geopolitics and international negotiations. An renown expert on the Near and Middle East and a specialist in contemporary conflicts, he wrote for the international press.

He works as a full Professor and Research Director at IRSEM (Institute for Strategic Research) in Paris, where he is a regional director in charge of the Euratlantic, Russia, and Middle East.

He lectures regularly in the field of international affairs, strategy, contemporary defence and conflict issues, particularly regarding the Middle East. He gives regular interviews in the media (leading newspapers, magazines, radios, TV) and keeps close links with numerous leading think tanks. He is married and has three daughters.

== Bibliography ==
- The Iran-Iraq War by Pierre Razoux and Translated by Nicholas Elliott - Nov 3, 2015
- La guerre Iran-Irak (TEMPUS t. 706) (French Edition) by Pierre Razoux
- La Guerre des Malouines by Charles Maisonneuve and Pierre Razoux - Dec 11, 2002
- Le Chili en guerre : deux siècles de supériorité navale chilienne en amérique latine by Pierre Razoux - Dec 3, 2004
- TSAHAL by Pierre Razoux - Jan 1, 2014
- Ciel de gloires: Histoire des as au combat (French Edition) by Pierre Razoux
- La guerre israélo-arabe d'octobre 1973 by Pierre Razoux - Jan 1, 1999
- Tsahal : Nouvelle histoire de l'armée israélienne by Pierre Razoux - Mar 2, 2006

=== Articles ===
- Towards a Copernican revolution in the MENA region
- Conference Report: "The Impact of the Arab Crisis on Security Institutions in North Africa and the Middle East"
- What future for post-Gaddafi Libya?
- "Six months after the start of the Arab Spring: impact and challenges for the countries of North Africa and the Middle East and for NATO partnerships"
- NATO in Libya: The Alliance between emergency help and nation building by Florence GAUB - Sandy GUPTILL - Richard D. HOOKER - Karl-Heinz KAMP - Pierre RAZOUX - Rolf SCHWARZ
- The Arab Explosion: Questions and Options for NATO by Florence GAUB - Sandy GUPTILL - Karl-Heinz KAMP - Pierre RAZOUX - Rolf SCHWARZ
- What to expect of the Egyptian army?
- What to think of the political crisis in North Africa and the Middle East
- How to revitalize the dialogue between NATO and the Maghreb countries
- What future for NATO’s Istanbul Cooperation Initiative?
- "NATO and Gulf Security"
- What future for Georgia?
- The keys to understanding the Israel–Russia relationship
- The NATO Mediterranean Dialogue at a crossroads
- Report on the MD-ICI Research Workshop
- Few keys to understand Iran’s foreign policy in Hérodote 2018/2 (No 169)
- Jean-Christophe Notin. La Guerre de la France au Mali in Afrique contemporaine 2014/3 (No 251)
- The Determinants of Israeli Strategic Thinking in Revue internationale et stratégique 2011/2 (No 82)
- Pierre Razoux: New Deal in the Middle East? in Politique étrangère 2009/3 (Autumn Issue)
- Pierre Razoux: Israel Strikes Syria: A Mysterious Raid in Politique étrangère 2008/1 (Spring Issue)
