= Abdolali Pourshasb =

Iranian general

Amir Abdolali Pourshasb
- عبدالعلی پورشاسب
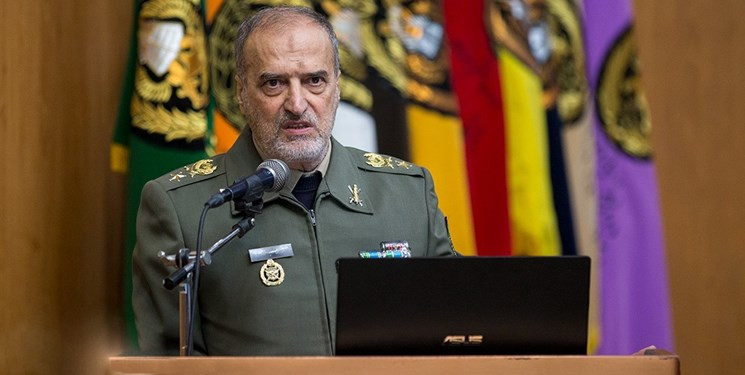
- Pourshasb in 2020

Deputy Director of the Research Institute of Holy Defense Sciences and Knowledge
- Incumbent
- Assumed office 2020
- President: Hassan Rouhani; Ebrahim Raisi; Mohammad Mokhber (acting); Masoud Pezeshkian
- Supreme Leader: Ali Khamenei; Mojtaba Khamenei
- Preceded by: Abdolreza Khodakarami

Senior Advisor to the Commander of the Khatam al-Anbiya Central Headquarters
- In office 2018–2020
- President: Hassan Rouhani
- Supreme Leader: Ali Khamenei
- Preceded by: ?
- Succeeded by: Abdul-Mohammad Raoofinejad

Deputy for Field Supervision and Evaluation of the Khatam al-Anbiya Central Headquarters
- In office 2016–2018
- President: Hassan Rouhani
- Supreme Leader: Ali Khamenei
- Preceded by: ?
- Succeeded by: Morteza Saffari

Deputy Head of Pillars and Joint Affairs of the General Staff of the Armed Forces
- In office 2013–2016
- President: Hassan Rouhani
- Supreme Leader: Ali Khamenei
- Preceded by: Amir Hatami
- Succeeded by: ?

Deputy for Inspection of the General Staff of the Armed Forces
- In office 2005–2013
- President: Mahmoud Ahmadinejad; Hassan Rouhani
- Supreme Leader: Ali Khamenei
- Preceded by: Ataollah Salehi
- Succeeded by: Mohammad-Reza Gharaei Ashtiani

Chief of the Joint Staff of the Islamic Republic of Iran Army
- In office 5 February 2001 – 26 September 2005
- President: Mohammad Khatami; Mahmoud Ahmadinejad
- Supreme Leader: Ali Khamenei
- Preceded by: Shahram Rostami
- Succeeded by: Abdolrahim Mousavi

Commander of the Iranian Army Ground Forces
- In office 1 October 1997 – 7 February 2001
- President: Mohammad Khatami
- Supreme Leader: Ali Khamenei
- Preceded by: Ahmad Dadbin
- Succeeded by: Nasser Mohammadifar

Deputy Commander of the Iranian Army Ground Forces
- In office 28 May 1997 – 1 October 1997
- President: Mohammad Khatami
- Supreme Leader: Ali Khamenei
- Preceded by: Karim Ebadat
- Succeeded by: Abolghasem Sharaf-al-Ziad

Head of the Fifth Department of the Army Joint Staff
- In office 21 June 1996 – 28 May 1997
- President: Akbar Hashemi Rafsanjani; Mohammad Khatami
- Supreme Leader: Ali Khamenei
- Preceded by: ?
- Succeeded by: ?

Personal details
- Born: 1948 (age 77–78) Kermanshah, Pahlavi Iran

Military service
- Allegiance: Pahlavi Iran (1967–1979); Iran (1979–present)
- Branch/service: Ground Force
- Years of service: 1967–present
- Rank: Brigadier General
- Battles/wars: Iran–Iraq War; KDPI insurgency (1989–1996); War in Afghanistan (2001–2021); 2001 uprising in Herat; Insurgency in Sistan and Balochistan; Syrian civil war; Iranian intervention in Syria; War in Iraq (2013–2017); Iranian intervention in Iraq; Iran–PJAK conflict; Western Iran clashes

Abdolali Pourshasb (Persian: عبدالعلی پورشاسب; born 1948) is a Brigadier General of the Islamic Republic of Iran Army, who was the Commander-in-Chief of the Iranian Army Ground Forces from the beginning of 1997 to 2001.

Pourshasb served as the Chief of the Joint Staff of the Islamic Republic of Iran Army from 2001 to 2005, was the Deputy Inspector of the General Staff of the Armed Forces from 2005 to 2013, served as the Deputy Deputy for Joint Affairs and Structures of the General Staff of the Armed Forces from 2013 to 2016, served as the Deputy for Supervision and Evaluation of the Khatam al-Anbiya Central Headquarters from 2016 to 2018, and was Senior Advisor to the Commander of the Khatam al-Anbiya Central Headquarters from 2018 to 2020. He is currently the deputy director of the Research Institute for Sacred Defense Sciences and Education, and also works as a lecturer at the Supreme National Defense University and the AJA Command and Staff University.

== Biography ==
Abdolali Pourshasb was born in 1948 in Kermanshah. After completing his primary and secondary education, he was recruited by the Imperial Iranian Army in 1967. After serving in the army, he attended the Officers' Academy, the Armored Preparatory School, the Armored High School, the Iranian Army Command and Staff School, and the Pakistani Command and Staff School.

His responsibilities during the Iran–Iraq War include being the deputy and commander of the 264th Tank Battalion in the 92nd Armored Division in Ahvaz and the acting commander of the 37th Armored Brigade in Shiraz.

After the war, Pourshasb also held responsibilities such as the commander of the Shiraz Armored Training Center, a professor at the Command and Staff School, the head of the Defense School of the Supreme National Defense University, and the head of the AJA Education Department.

From June 21, 1996, he was the head of the Fifth Department of the Army Joint Staff until May 28, 1997, when he was appointed as the deputy and acting commander of the Army Ground Forces.

Abdolali Pourshasb was the commander of the Ground Forces of the Islamic Republic of Iran Army from 1 October 1997 to 7 February 2001. He was then appointed as the Chief of the Joint Staff of the Armed Forces and held this position until 5 February 2001. In 2005, he was appointed as the Deputy Inspector of the General Staff of the Armed Forces and served in this position until 2013. From 2013 to 2015, he served as the Deputy Chief of the Joint Staff of the Armed Forces. In 2016, Pourshasb was appointed as the Deputy Chief of the Supervision and Evaluation of the Khatam al-Anbiya Central Headquarters and served in this position until 2018.

He is currently the Deputy Chief of the Research Institute for Sacred Defense Sciences and Education of the General Staff of the Armed Forces and teaches at the Supreme National Defense University and the Command and Staff University of the Armed Forces.

From June 1997 to October of the same year, Pourshasb served as the Deputy Commander of the Army Ground Forces, then replaced the then Commander of the Ground Forces; He became Brigadier General Ahmad Dadbin. He was the commander of the Ground Forces of the Islamic Republic of Iran Army from October 1997 to February 1990.

From 1990 to October 2005, Pourshasb served as the eleventh military officer after the revolution, and then, by decree of Ali Khamenei, he was appointed as the Deputy Inspector of the General Staff of the Armed Forces, and for a while he served as the successor to Major General Mohammad Bagher in the Directorate of Joint Affairs and Structures of the Armed Forces. He is currently the Deputy Evaluation Officer of the Khatam al-Anbia Central Headquarters and teaches at the Higher National Defense University and DAVOS AJA.

Military offices
Preceded by Ahmad Dadbin	Commander of Islamic Republic of Iran Army's Ground Forces; 1997–2001	Succeeded by Nasser Mohammadifar
