= Mohammad-Hossein Dadras =

Iranian regular military (Artesh) officer

Amir Mohammad-Hossein Dadras
- محمدحسین دادرس
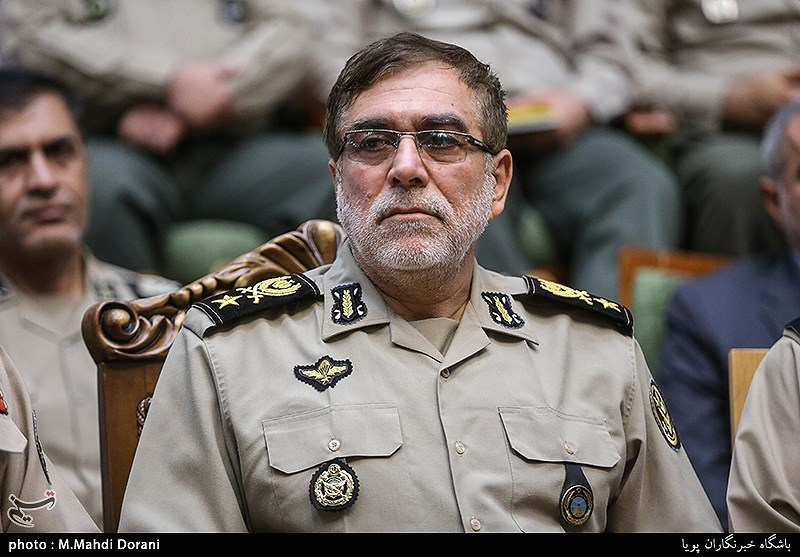
- Dadras in 2018
- Born: Pahlavi Iran
- Education: Imam Ali Officers' Academy
- Military career
- Allegiance: Iran
- Branch: Ground Force
- Service years: 1979–present
- Rank: Brigadier General
- Commands: Deputy Commander-in-Chief of the Islamic Republic of Iran Army (2017–present); Coordinating Deputy of the Islamic Republic of Iran Army (2008–2017); Ground Force (2005–2008); Deputy commander of the Ground Force (2000–2005); Deputy Coordinator of the Ground Force (1997–2000); 64th Infantry Division (?–?)
- Conflicts: Iran–Iraq War (WIA); Insurgency in Sistan and Balochistan; Syrian civil war; Iranian intervention in Syria; War in Iraq (2013–2017); Iranian intervention in Iraq; Iran–PJAK conflict; Western Iran clashes; 2019–2021 Persian Gulf crisis; 2024 Iran–Israel conflict; Twelve-Day War; 2026 Iran war

Mohammad-Hossein Dadras (Persian: محمدحسین دادرس) is an Iranian regular military (Artesh) officer with the rank of brigadier who currently serves as the Deputy Commander-in-Chief of Islamic Republic of Iran Army.

== Career ==
Mohammad-Hossein Dadras entered the Officers' Academy in 1979, He advanced through the command ranks during the years of the Iran–Iraq War.

Dadras previously served as the commander of Islamic Republic of Iran Ground Forces and Coordinating Deputy of the Islamic Republic of Iran Army.

In a speech given in October 2021, Dadras highlighted Iran's ability to internally manufacture advanced military hardware, such as Jet jet engines, drones, missiles, electronic and radar systems, highlighting that Iran does not rely on imports from foreign arms. In addition, he emphasized that Iran's Army Air Force can analyze regional threats and respond to any threat in the shortest possible time.

He has dismissed Israel's military power, saying "The Zionist regime of Israel cannot equal Iran," and warned about Iran's capacity to respond firmly to any threats.

== Sanctions ==
Dadras is subject to international sanctions imposed by the UK as of October 2024. These sanctions were imposed following Iran's continued dangerous and destabilizing activity across the Middle East. Dadras is claimed to be involved in hostile activity by the Government of Iran, namely threatening, planning or conducting activity which is intended to undermine the prosperity or security of Israel. The sanctions include a travel ban and asset freeze.

Foreign Secretary David Lammy said: "Despite repeated warnings, the dangerous actions of Iran and its proxies are driving further escalation in the Middle East." "Following its ballistic missile attack on Israel, we are holding Iran to account and exposing those who facilitated these acts."

In a ceremony in September 2020, at AJA University of Command and Staff, Brigadier General Mohammad Hossein Dadras referred to Iran's progress and achievements “History shows that nations and societies will never step forward to achieve perfect results without experiencing hardship and limitations.” He stated that since the victory of the Islamic Revolution, Iran has faced continuous pressure and restrictions. However, he emphasized that these very limitations have driven the country's progress, for example international arms embargoes compelled Iranian experts to rely on domestic expertise and indigenous capabilities to develop the military equipment the nation required.

Military offices
| Preceded by Ahmad Reza Pourdastan | Deputy Commander-in-Chief of the Islamic Republic of Iran Army; 5 November 2017–present | Incumbent |
| Preceded by Abdolrahim Mousavi as Chairman of Joint Staff of the Islamic Republic of Iran Army | Coordinating Deputy of the Islamic Republic of Iran Army; 25 August 2008–5 November 2017 | Succeeded by Habibollah Sayyari |
| Preceded by Nasser Mohammadifar | Commander of the Islamic Republic of Iran Ground Force; 26 September 2005–25 August 2008 | Succeeded by Ahmad Reza Pourdastan |
| Preceded by Mohammad-Reza Gharaei Ashtiani | Deputy Commander of the Islamic Republic of Iran Ground Force; 2000–2005 | Succeeded by Syed Naser Hosseini |
| Preceded by Abdolqasem Sharaf al-Ziyad | Deputy Coordinator of the Islamic Republic of Iran Ground Force; 1997–2000 | Succeeded by ? |
| Preceded by ? | Commander of the 64th Infantry Division ?–? | Succeeded by ? |
