= Ahmad Reza Pourdastan =

Iranian general

Amir Ahmad Reza Pourdastan
- احمدرضا پوردستان
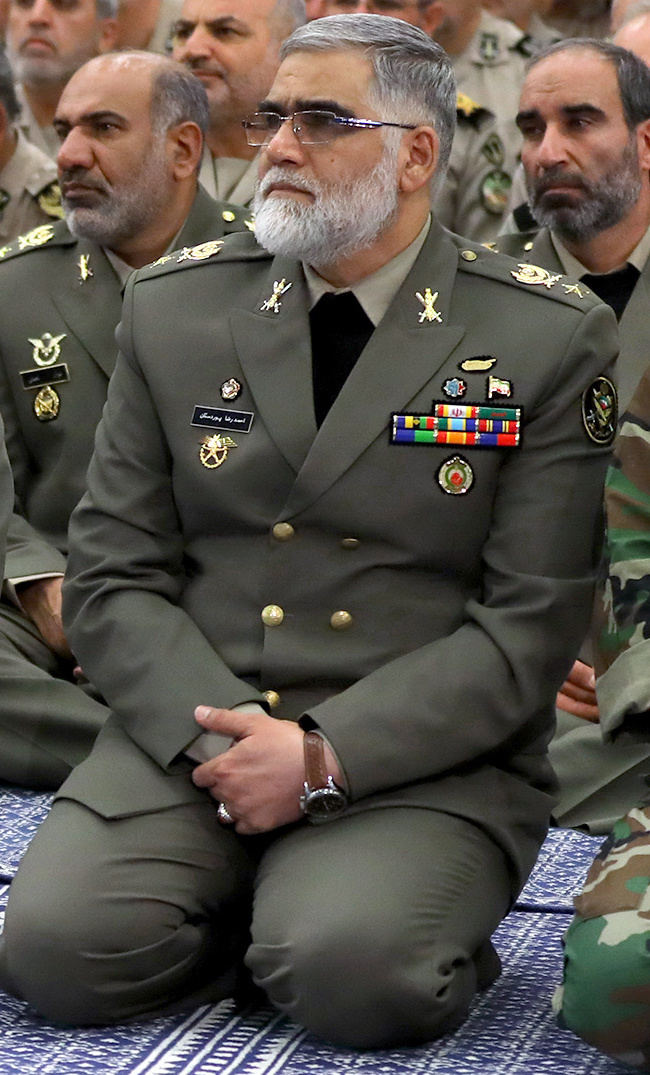
- Pourdastan in 2017
- Born: 1961 (age 64–65); Ahvaz, Pahlavi Iran
- Military career
- Allegiance: Iran
- Branch: Basij; Ground Force
- Service years: 1980–present
- Rank: Brigadier General
- Commands: Army Center for Strategic Studies (2017–present); Deputy Commander-in-Chief of the Islamic Republic of Iran Army (2016–2017); Ground Force (2008–2016); Deputy Commander of the Ground Force (2007–2008); Commander of Lorestan, Kohgiluyeh and Boyerahmad, Khorasan, and Fars Provinces Forces (2006–2007); Imam Ali Officers' Academy (2005–2006); 77th Infantry Division (2003–2005); 84th Infantry Division (2001–2003); 25th Takavar Brigade (1999–2000)
- Conflicts: Iran–Iraq War; Insurgency in Sistan and Balochistan; Syrian civil war; Iranian intervention in Syria; War in Iraq (2013–2017); Iranian intervention in Iraq; Iran–PJAK conflict; Western Iran clashes

Ahmad Reza Pourdastan (Persian: احمدرضا پوردستان; born 1961) is an Iranian general serving as the head of the Strategic Studies and Research Center of the Islamic Republic of Iran Army. Previously he was the Deputy Commander-in-Chief of the Artesh.

== Biography ==
Ahmad-Reza Pourdastan was born in Ahvaz, Khuzestan province. He completed his education from primary school up to his high school diploma in Ahvaz. Following the outbreak of the Iran–Iraq War, he joined the Basij force as a volunteer. In 1980, after passing the national university entrance exam, he entered the Imam Ali Officers' Academy. He began his official career in the Army Ground Forces upon graduating from the academy in 1983. Pourdastan completed his advanced course in 1992 at the Shiraz Infantry Center and finished his DAFOOS course in 1996.

Holding the rank of colonel, he commanded the 25th Northwestern Commando Brigade of the Army Ground Forces (NEZAJA) between 1999 and 2000. In 2001, with the rank of second brigadier general, he became the commander of the 84th Lorestan Division and served in this role until 2003. He commanded the 77th Khorasan Division from 2003 to 2005, served as the commander of the Imam Ali Officers' Academy for less than a year from 2005 to 2006, and was the regional Army commander for the provinces of Lorestan, Kohgiluyeh and Boyerahmad, Khorasan, and Fars from 2006 to 2007.

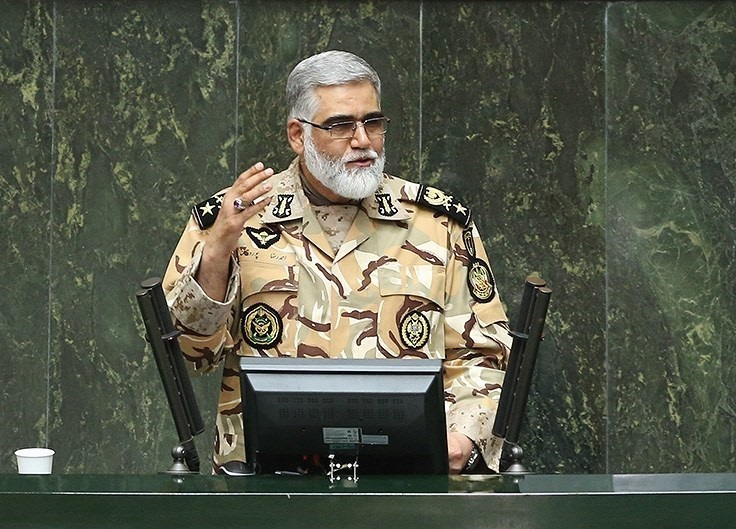
Ahmad reza Pourdastan speaking in the Iranian Parliament

Pourdastan held the position of Deputy Commander of the Army Ground Forces for one year from 2007 to 2008, and subsequently commanded the Army Ground Forces from 2008 to 2016. He assumed the role of Deputy Commander-in-Chief of the Army in 2016, until Brigadier General Mohammad-Hossein Dadras replaced him in November 2017. Pourdastan has been serving as the Head of the Army Center for Strategic Studies and Research from 2017 to the present day.

Military offices
Preceded by Davoud Aghamohammadi	Head of the Army Center for Strategic Studies; 5 November 2017–present	Succeeded by Incumbent
Preceded by Abdolrahim Mousavi	Deputy Commander-in-Chief of the Islamic Republic of Iran Army; 19 November 2016–5 November 2017	Succeeded by Mohammad-Hossein Dadras
Preceded by Mohammad-Hossein Dadras	Commander of Islamic Republic of Iran Ground Forces; 25 August 2008–19 November 2016	Succeeded by Kioumars Heydari
Preceded by Syed Naser Hosseini	Deputy Commander of Islamic Republic of Iran Ground Forces; 2007–2008	Succeeded by Kioumars Heydari
Preceded by ?	Commander of Lorestan, Kohgiluyeh and Boyerahmad, Khorasan, and Fars Provinces Forces; 2006–2007	Succeeded by ?
Preceded by Abdolrahim Mousavi	Commandant of Imam Ali Officers' Academy; 2005–2006	Succeeded by Fathollah Rashidzadeh
Preceded by ?	Commander of 77th Infantry Division; 2003–2005	Succeeded by ?
Preceded by ?	Commander of 84th Infantry Division; 2001–2003	Succeeded by Hossein Shokouhi
Preceded by ?	Commander of 25th Takavar Brigade; 1999–2000	Succeeded by ?
