= Ataollah Salehi =

Iranian military commander

Amir Ataollah Salehi
- عطاءالله صالحی
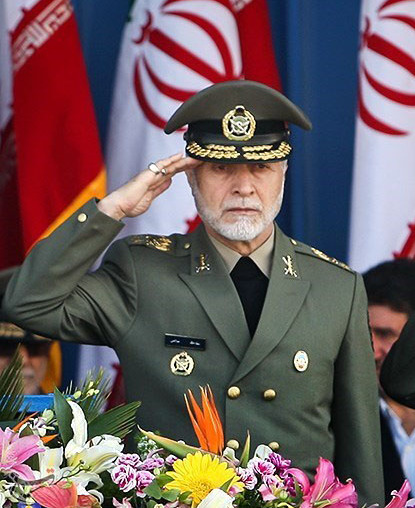
- General Salehi in 2015
- Born: Ataollah Salehi; 9 March 1950 (age 76); Rudsar, Gilan, Pahlavi Iran
- Children: Ammar Salehi (son); Fateme Salehi (daughter)
- Military career
- Allegiance: Pahlavi Iran (1968–1979); Iran (1979–2019)
- Branch: Ground Forces
- Service years: 1968–Present
- Rank: Major General
- Commands: Advisor to the Commander-in-Chief of the Armed Forces on Army Affairs (2019–present); Deputy Chief of the General Staff (2017–2019); Islamic Republic of Iran Army (2005–2017); Imam Ali Officers' Academy (1998–2001); Ground Forces Northeast Regional Headquarters (?–1998); Deputy of Education of the General Command Headquarters of the Armed Forces (1988–?); 77th Infantry Division (1984–1988); 58th Takavar Division (?–?)
- Conflicts: Iran–Iraq War; Insurgency in Sistan and Balochistan; Syrian civil war; Iranian intervention in Syria; War in Iraq (2013–2017); Iranian intervention in Iraq; Iran–PJAK conflict; Western Iran clashes; 2019–2021 Persian Gulf crisis

Ataollah Salehi (Persian: عطاءالله صالحی; born 9 March 1950) is the former and third commander-in-chief of the Islamic Republic of Iran Army, serving from 2005 until 2017. He graduated before the Islamic Revolution from the Iranian Army's military academy in 1971 with the rank of Artillery Second Lieutenant of the Army's Ground Forces.

He has the direct operational command authority over the commanders of the Iranian Army's Ground Forces, Air Force, Navy and Air Defense Base.

As head of Iran's regular military, he was a member of Iran's Supreme National Security Council.

== Quotes ==
The enemy has gone insane and given the insane enemy's history, we should always be prepared.

The Iranian nation will observe that we will manufacture the largest destroyer and the most advanced submarines in the region. Mass production of fighter jets, the samples of which were unveiled last year (2008), and plans to manufacture vessels and submarines will be on our agenda in the new (Iranian) year (started 20 March).

== See also ==
- List of Iranian two-star generals since 1979

Military offices
Preceded by Vacant	Advisor to the Commander-in-Chief of the Armed Forces on Army Affairs; 2 July 2019–present	Succeeded by Amir Hatami
Preceded by Abdolrahim Mousavi	Deputy Chief of the General Staff of Iranian Armed Forces; 21 August 2017–2 July 2019	Succeeded by Mohammad-Reza Gharaei Ashtiani
Preceded by Mohammad Salimi	Commander-in-Chief of the Islamic Republic of Iran Army; 11 September 2005–21 August 2017	Succeeded by Abdolrahim Mousavi
Preceded by Behrouz Soleimanjah	Deputy for Inspection of the General Staff of the Armed Forces; 2003–2005	Succeeded by Abdolali Pourshasb
Preceded by Akbar Dianatfar	Deputy for Human Resources of the General Staff; 2001–2003	Succeeded by Hossein Yasini
Preceded by Hossein Hatami	Commandant of Imam Ali Officers' Academy; 1998–2001	Succeeded by Abdolrahim Mousavi
Preceded by ?	Commandaner of the Ground Forces Northeast Regional Headquarters ?–1998	Succeeded by Abdolrahim Mousavi
Preceded by Office Established	Deputy of Education of the General Command Headquarters of the Armed Forces; 1988–?	Succeeded by ?
Preceded by Manouchehr Dezhkam	Commander of the 77th Infantry Division of Khurasan; 1984–1988	Succeeded by Siyabakhsh Nasiri Ziba
Preceded by ?	Commander of the 58th Takavar Division of Shahroud ?–?	Succeeded by ?
