= Mohammad-Reza Gharaei Ashtiani =

Iranian military officer (born 1960)

Amir Mohammad-Reza Gharaei Ashtiani
- محّمدرضا قرایی آشتیانی
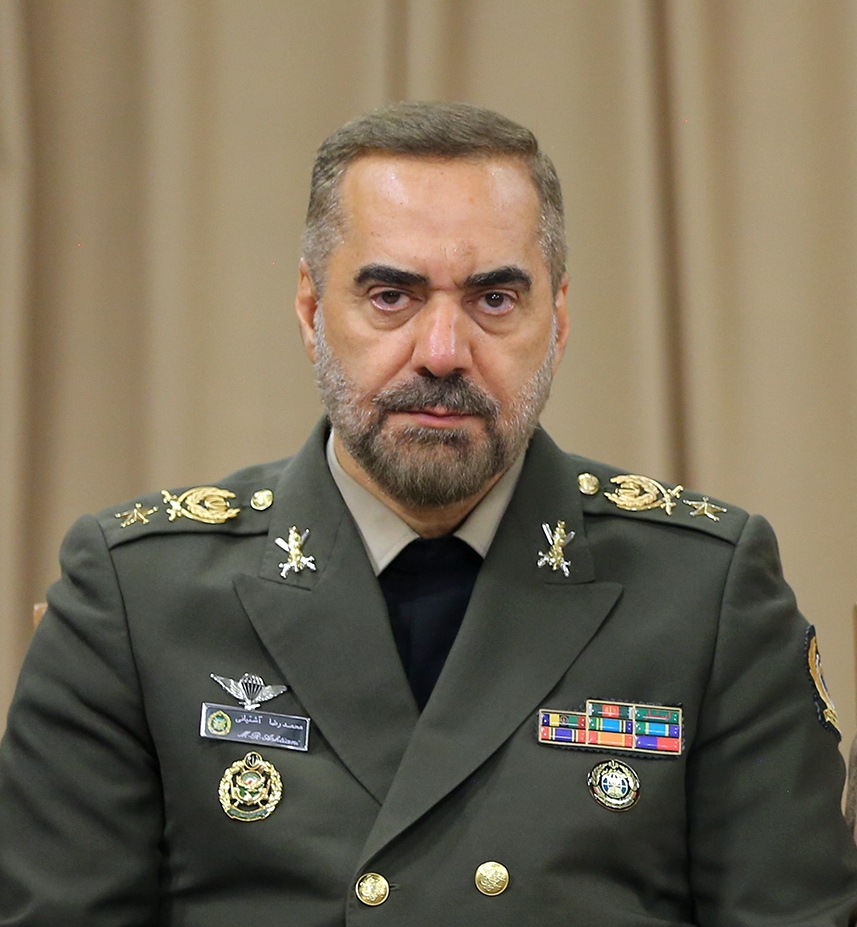
- Ashtiani in 2024

Deputy Chief of the General Staff of the Iranian Armed Forces
- In office 21 August 2024 – 10 August 2026
- President: Masoud Pezeshkian
- Supreme Leader: Ali Khamenei; Mojtaba Khamenei
- Preceded by: Aziz Nasirzadeh
- Succeeded by: Kioumars Heydari
- In office 2 July 2019 – 19 September 2021
- President: Hassan Rouhani; Ebrahim Raisi
- Supreme Leader: Ali Khamenei
- Preceded by: Ataollah Salehi
- Succeeded by: Aziz Nasirzadeh

Minister of Defence and Armed Forces Logistics
- In office 25 August 2021 – 21 August 2024
- President: Ebrahim Raisi; Mohammad Mokhber (acting); Masoud Pezeshkian
- Supreme Leader: Ali Khamenei
- Preceded by: Amir Hatami
- Succeeded by: Aziz Nasirzadeh

Deputy Chief for Inspection for the General Staff
- In office 2013–2019
- President: Mahmoud Ahmadinejad; Hassan Rouhani
- Supreme Leader: Ali Khamenei
- Preceded by: Abdolali Pourshasb
- Succeeded by: ?

Deputy Commander-in-chief of the Islamic Republic of Iran Army
- In office 26 September 2005 – 25 August 2008
- President: Mohammad Khatami; Mahmoud Ahmadinejad
- Supreme Leader: Ali Khamenei
- Preceded by: Habib Baghaei
- Succeeded by: Abdolrahim Mousavi
- Supreme Leader: Ali Khamenei

Deputy for Readiness, Logistics and Industrial Research of the General Staff
- In office 2000–2005
- President: Mohammad Khatami; Mahmoud Ahmadinejad
- Supreme Leader: Ali Khamenei
- Preceded by: ?
- Succeeded by: ?

Second-in-Command of the Ground Force
- In office 1999–2000
- President: Mohammad Khatami
- Supreme Leader: Ali Khamenei
- Preceded by: Abolghasem Sharaf-al-Ziad
- Succeeded by: Mohammad-Hossein Dadras

Personal details
- Born: c. 1960 (age 65–66) Tehran, Pahlavi Iran
- Education: Imam Ali Officers' Academy; AJA University of Command and Staff; Supreme National Defense University

Military service
- Allegiance: Iran
- Branch/service: Ground Forces
- Years of service: 1979–present
- Rank: Brigadier General
- Unit: 23rd Takavar Division; Imam Ali Officers' Academy
- Battles/wars: 1979 Kurdish Rebellion; Iran–Iraq War; Insurgency in Sistan and Balochistan; Syrian civil war; Iranian intervention in Syria; War in Iraq (2013–2017); Iranian intervention in Iraq; Iran–PJAK conflict; Western Iran clashes; 2024 Iran–Israel conflict; Twelve-Day War; 2026 Iran war

Mohammad-Reza Gharaei Ashtiani (Persian: محّمدرضا قرایی آشتیانی; born 1960) is an Iranian military officer who served as the deputy chief of staff of the Iranian Armed Forces from 2024 to 2026. A position he previously held from 2019 to 2021. Gharaei Ashtiani was the minister of defence and armed forces logistics from 2021 to 2024, under the presidency of Ebrahim Raisi.

Due to his connections to the unmanned aerial vehicles (UAVs) of Russia and Iranian defense industry, Ashtiani was sanctioned by the United States Department of Treasury.

== Early life ==
Mohammad-Reza Gharaei Ashtiani was born in 1960 in Tehran.

== Military career ==
He entered the officers' academy in 1979 and completed his bachelor's degree studies in 1982. After completing his introductory course at the Shiraz Infantry Center, he underwent specialized training in the 23rd Commando Division and began his official military service in the 172nd Battalion of the 2nd Brigade within the 23rd Takavar Division. In 1984, by order of Ali Sayad Shirazi, the then-commander of the Army Ground Forces, he was assigned to train officer cadets at the Imam Ali Officers' Academy.

Gharaei advanced through various command ranks during the Iran–Iraq War. Following the end of the war, Ashtiani earned a Master's degree in Military Affairs from the Army Command and Staff University and subsequently received a Doctorate in Defense Management from the Supreme National Defense University. In 1999, he was appointed as the Deputy Commander of the Army Ground Forces, and a year later, he became the Deputy Chief of Army Logistics, Support, and Industrial Research, serving in this role until 2005. Between 2005 and 2008, he served as the Deputy Commander-in-Chief of the Army.

In 2008, he was transferred to the General Staff of the Armed Forces. Until 2013, he initially headed the Strategic Management and Human Resources Group of the General Staff, and later served as the Deputy Chief of Planning and Programs for the Chief of the General Staff of the Armed Forces. From 2013 to 2019, Gharaei Ashtiani held the position of Deputy Chief of Inspection for the General Staff of the Armed Forces.

Ashtiani was promoted to the Deputy Chief of Staff of the Armed Forces of Islamic Republic of Iran (Artesh) on 2 July 2019, following a decree by Supreme Leader Ali Khamenei. Ashtiani replaced Major General Ataollah Salehi. He was selected to be the Minister of Defense by President Ebrahim Raisi and then was approved for the position and took office on 25 August 2021.

== Defense Minister ==
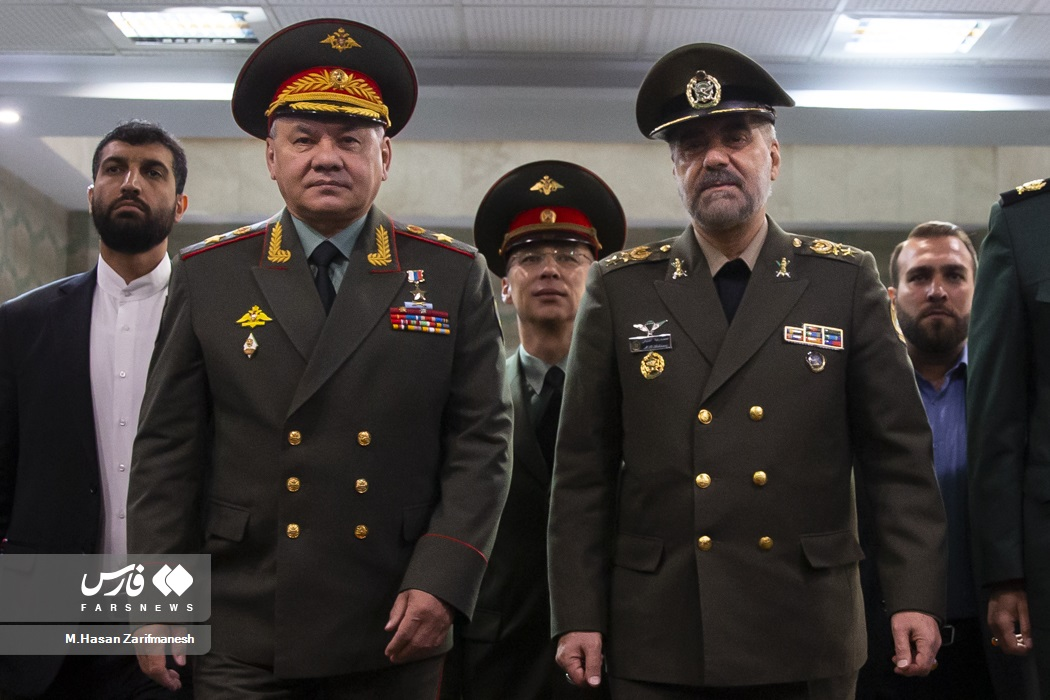
Ashtiani with Russian Defense Minister Sergei Shoigu in Tehran, 20 September 2023

Ashtiani’s selection for the position was favored by outgoing minister Amir Hatami who called Ashtiani the “best candidate” for position. Ashtiani said that he would prioritize exporting various defense products to other countries around the world. He was reappointed as deputy chief of staff a week later

== International sanctions ==
On May 31, 2024, Ashtiani was placed on an EU sanctions list by the EU Council. He is accused of facilitating and providing material support to Russia's war against Ukraine by supplying Iranian weaponry, namely unmanned aerial vehicles (UAVs), to Russia's Armed Forces.

== Awards and decorations ==

Government offices
Preceded by Amir Hatami	Minister of Defense; 2021–2024	Succeeded by Aziz Nasirzadeh
Military offices
Preceded by Aziz Nasirzadeh	Deputy Chief of the General Staff of the Armed Forces; 2024–2026	Succeeded by Kioumars Heydari
Preceded by Ataollah Salehi	Deputy Chief of the General Staff of the Armed Forces; 2019–2021	Succeeded by Aziz Nasirzadeh
Preceded by Abdolali Pourshasb	Deputy Chief for Inspection for the General Staff; 2013–2019	Unknown
Preceded by Habib Baghaei	Deputy Commander-in-Chief of the Islamic Republic of Iran Army; 2005–2008	Succeeded by Abdolrahim Mousavi
Unknown	Deputy for Readiness, Logistics and Industrial Research of the General Staff; 2000–2005	Unknown
Preceded by Abolghasem Sharaf-al-Ziad	Deputy Commander of the Ground Force; 1999–2000	Succeeded by Mohammad-Hossein Dadras
