= Joint Staff of the Islamic Republic of Iran Army =

Chief of Staff of the Iranian Army

- ستاد مشترک ارتش جمهوری اسلامی ایران
- Seal and Flag of the Joint Staff of Islamic Republic of Iran Army
- Founded: 6 December 1921
- Current form: 14 October 1998
- Headquarters: Tehran, Iran

Leadership
- Commander-in-Chief: Major General Amir Hatami
- Chief of staff: Commodore Habibollah Sayyari

The Joint Staff of the Islamic Republic of Iran Army (Persian: ستاد مشترک ارتش جمهوری اسلامی ایران), acronymed SEMAJA (Persian: سماجا), is the chief of staff of the Islamic Republic of Iran Army, the conventional military of Iran, with an aim to coordinate its four military branches. The Joint Staff has Central Provost and University of Command and Staff under control.

== Structure reform ==
From 1921 to 1998, "Chairman of Chief of Staff" (Persian: رئیس ستاد مشترک ارتش) was the highest-ranking position within the Artesh, however after the newly established office "Commander-in-Chief of Artesh" (Persian: فرمانده کل ارتش) position was founded in 1998, the former position was deposed as a decision-making position and became the coordinator deputy of the Chief Commander (Persian: معاونت هماهنگ‌کننده ارتش). The position is currently held by Commodore Habibollah Sayyari, who is second-in-command and deputy of Major general Amir Hatami.

== List of chiefs ==
No.	Portrait	رئیس	Took office	Left office	Time in office	Ref.
Chairman of the Joint Staff
1	Mostafa Torabipour [fa]	Mostafa Torabipour	14 October 1998	21 June 2000	1 years	–
2	Shahram Rostami	Shahram Rostami (born 1948)	21 June 2000	5 February 2001	0 years	–
3	Abdolali Pourshasb	Abdolali Pourshasb (born 1948)	5 February 2001	26 September 2005	4 years	–
4	Abdolrahim Mousavi	Abdolrahim Mousavi (1960–2026)	26 September 2005	25 August 2008	2 years	–
Coordinating Deputy
5	Mohammad-Hossein Dadras	Mohammad-Hossein Dadras	25 August 2008	5 November 2017	9 years	–
6	Habibollah Sayyari	Habibollah Sayyari (born 1956)	5 November 2017		8 years	–

== See also ==
- General Staff of the Islamic Republic of Iran Armed Forces
- List of Chiefs of Staff of the Islamic Republic of Iran Army
- List of commanders of the Islamic Revolutionary Guard Corps
- Islamic Revolutionary Guard Corps Joint Staff
