= Abdolrahim Mousavi =

Iranian military officer (1960–2026)

Amir Seyyed Abdolrahim Mousavi
- عبدالرحیم موسوی
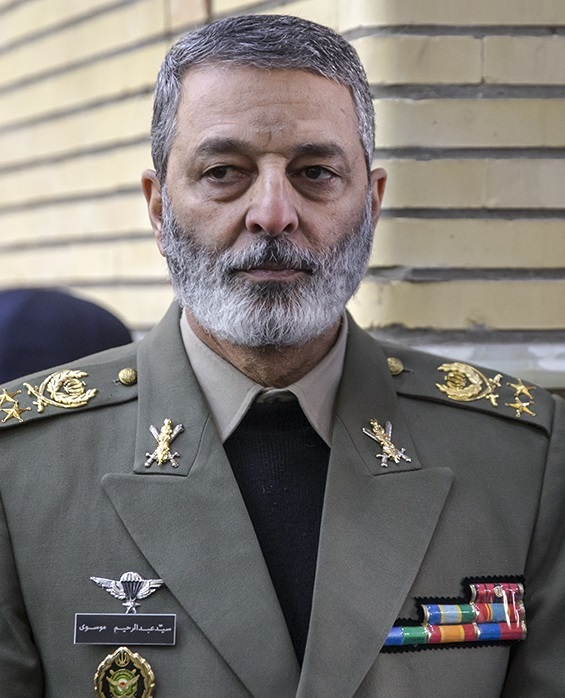
- Mousavi in 2019

3rd Chief of the General Staff of the Islamic Republic of Iran Armed Forces
- In office 13 June 2025 – 28 February 2026
- President: Masoud Pezeshkian
- Deputy: Mohammad-Reza Gharaei Ashtiani
- Supreme Leader: Ali Khamenei
- Preceded by: Mohammad Bagheri
- Succeeded by: Ali Abdollahi

4th Commander-in-Chief of the Islamic Republic of Iran Army
- In office 21 August 2017 – 13 June 2025
- President: Hassan Rouhani; Ebrahim Raisi; Mohammad Mokhber (acting); Masoud Pezeshkian
- Supreme Leader: Ali Khamenei
- Preceded by: Ataollah Salehi
- Succeeded by: Amir Hatami

Deputy Chief of the General Staff of the Islamic Republic of Iran Armed Forces
- In office 5 July 2016 – 21 August 2017
- President: Hassan Rouhani
- Supreme Leader: Ali Khamenei
- Preceded by: Gholam Ali Rashid
- Succeeded by: Ataollah Salehi

Commander of the Khatam al-Anbia Air Defense Headquarters
- In office 2019–2021
- President: Hassan Rouhani
- Supreme Leader: Ali Khamenei
- Preceded by: Alireza Sabahifard
- Succeeded by: Ghader Rahimzadeh

Deputy Commander-in-chief of the Islamic Republic of Iran Army
- In office 25 August 2008 – 19 November 2016
- President: Mahmoud Ahmadinejad; Hassan Rouhani
- Supreme Leader: Ali Khamenei
- Preceded by: Mohammad-Reza Gharaei Ashtiani
- Succeeded by: Ahmad Reza Pourdastan

Head of the Army Center for Strategic Studies
- In office 2005–2016
- President: Mahmoud Ahmadinejad; Hassan Rouhani
- Supreme Leader: Ali Khamenei
- Preceded by: Office Established
- Succeeded by: Davoud Aghamohammadi

Chairman of the Joint Staff of the Islamic Republic of Iran Army
- In office 26 September 2005 – 25 August 2008
- President: Mohammad Khatami; Mahmoud Ahmadinejad
- Supreme Leader: Ali Khamenei
- Preceded by: Abdolali Pourshasb
- Succeeded by: Mohammad-Hossein Dadras

Deputy for Planning, Program, and Budget of the Army Ground Forces
- In office ?–2005
- President: Mohammad Khatami
- Supreme Leader: Ali Khamenei
- Preceded by: ?
- Succeeded by: ?

Commandant of Imam Ali Officers' Academy
- In office 2001–2005
- President: Mohammad Khatami
- Supreme Leader: Ali Khamenei
- Preceded by: Ataollah Salehi
- Succeeded by: Ahmad Reza Pourdastan

Personal details
- Born: 23 June 1960 Qom, Pahlavi Iran
- Died: 28 February 2026 (aged 65) Tehran, Iran
- Cause of death: Airstrike
- Resting place: Fatima Masumeh Shrine
- Awards: Order of Fath (1st class)

Military service
- Allegiance: Iran
- Branch/service: Islamic Republic of Iran Ground Forces
- Years of service: 1979–2026
- Rank: Major General; Lieutenant General (posthumously)
- Unit: 28th Infantry Division of Kordestan; 33rd Artillery Group
- Commands: Ground Forces Northeast Regional Headquarters (1998–2001)
- Battles/wars: Iran–Iraq War; Insurgency in Sistan and Balochistan; Operation Nasr; Operation Beit ol-Moqaddas; Operation Dawn-4; Operation Ghader; Operation Dawn 9; Syrian civil war; Iranian intervention in Syria; War in Iraq (2013–2017); Iranian intervention in Iraq; Iran–PJAK conflict; Western Iran clashes; 2019–2021 Persian Gulf crisis; Iran–Israel conflict; 2024 Iran–Israel conflict; Twelve-Day War; 2026 Iran war X

Abdolrahim Mousavi (23 June 1960 – 28 February 2026) was an Iranian military officer who served as Chief of Staff of the Iranian Armed Forces from June 2025 until his death. He assumed the position following the death of his predecessor, Mohammad Bagheri, during the Twelve-Day War. Previously, he served as commander-in-chief of the Islamic Republic of Iran Army from 2017 to 2025.

== Early life ==
Abdolrahim Mousavi was born in 1960 in an underprivileged area of Qom. His father owned a spinning workshop, where Mousavi began working at the age of six. He married at the age of 23 and had two sons.

Mousavi held a professional football refereeing license and had coaching experience. However, despite his deep passion for football and the national team, severe stress prevented him from watching the Iranian national football team's matches.

== Career ==
=== Early years ===
Mousavi's military career began following the Islamic Revolution in 1979. During the 1980–88 Iran–Iraq War, he served in the Iranian Army's artillery units on various fronts, including with the 28th Kurdistan Division in Kurdistan province, and with the 33rd Artillery Group in Khuzestan province.

From 1999 to 2005, he served as the Chief of the Joint Staff of the Ground Forces. From 2008 to 2016, he was Deputy Commander-in-Chief of the Iranian Army. From 2016 to 2017, he was deputy chief of staff of the Iranian Armed Forces. In 2017, he was promoted from Brigadier General to Major General, and from August 2017 to June 2025, he served as the chief of staff of the Ground Forces.

=== Commander-in-Chief of the Iranian Army ===
In April 2017, Mousavi was promoted from Brigadier General to Major General and made the commander-in-chief of Iran's ground forces. In August 2017, Mousavi said that the "martyrdom-seeking and jihadi spirit of the Iranian people" made it impossible for the United States and its allies to attack Iran militarily. In January 2018, he referred to the United States as the "Great Satan", and stated that his “greatest wish is the annihilation of Israel".

In September 2019, Mousavi said that the United States is "like an animal that would chase after you if you run away, and would run away if you attack them". Following the assassination of Qasem Soleimani in January 2020, Mousavi opined that the United States lacked the “courage to initiate” a conflict with Iran.

Mousavi stated in April 2023 that Israel was "too small to be considered a threat to the Islamic Republic of Iran,” as reported by Middle East Monitor. In May 2025 Mousavi dismissed comments by Israeli officials on Iran as "bluster", and said that "the Israeli leadership lacks the capacity to harm the greatness of Iran."

=== Chief of the General Staff of the Armed Forces ===
On 13 June 2025, Supreme Leader of Iran Ali Khamenei appointed Mousavi as the chief of staff of the armed forces, following the killing of Mousavi's predecessor Mohammad Bagheri in the Twelve-Day War.

=== Sanctions ===
In March 2023, Mousavi was sanctioned by the U.S. Department of the Treasury's Office of Foreign Assets Control (OFAC) for serious human rights abuses. It said that, in both the 2019–2020 Iranian protests and the 2022–2023 Mahsa Amini protests, troops under Mousavi's command "used machine guns to fire indiscriminately into crowds of protestors". He was also listed on sanctions lists of the European Union, United Kingdom, and Australia for serious human rights abuses.

== Death ==
On 1 March 2026, Iranian state television announced that Mousavi had been killed during the 2026 Iran war. It was reported that he had been killed along with the Ayatollah and the defense minister Aziz Nasirzadeh in the Ayatollah's office.

== Awards and honours ==
On 10 March 2024, Mousavi was awarded an Order of Fath medal by Supreme Leader Ali Khamenei for "improving the defence, combat, and deterrence power" of the Iranian armed forces.

== See also ==
- List of Iranian officials killed during the 2026 Iran war
- List of Iranian two-star generals since 1979
- Ebrahim Zolfaghari

Military offices
Preceded by Mohammad Bagheri	Chief-of-Staff of the Iranian Armed Forces; 13 June 2025–28 February 2026	Succeeded by Ali Abdollahi
Preceded by Ataollah Salehi	Commander-in-Chief of the Islamic Republic of Iran Army; 21 August 2017–13 June 2025	Succeeded by Amir Hatami
Preceded by Gholam Ali Rashid	Deputy Chief of the General Staff of Iranian Armed Forces; 5 July 2016–21 August 2017	Succeeded by Ataollah Salehi
Preceded by Alireza Sabahifard	Commander of the Khatam al-Anbia Air Defense Headquarters; 2019–2021	Succeeded by Ghader Rahimzadeh
Preceded by Mohammad-Reza Gharaei Ashtiani	Deputy Commander-in-chief of Islamic Republic of Iran Army; 25 August 2008–19 November 2016	Succeeded by Ahmad Reza Pourdastan
Preceded by Office Established	Head of the Army Center for Strategic Studies; 2005–2016	Succeeded by Davoud Aghamohammadi
Preceded by Abdolali Pourshasb	Chairman of the Joint Staff of the Islamic Republic of Iran Army; 26 September 2005–25 August 2008	Succeeded by Mohammad-Hossein Dadras as Coordinating Deputy of the Islamic Republic of Iran Army
Preceded by ?	Deputy for Planning, Program, and Budget of the Army Ground Forces ?–2005	Succeeded by ?
Preceded by Ataollah Salehi	Commandant of Imam Ali Officers' Academy; 2001–2005	Succeeded by Ahmad Reza Pourdastan
Preceded by Ataollah Salehi	Commandaer of the Ground Forces Northeast Regional Headquarters; 1998–2001	Succeeded by Ali Karimi
