= Amir Hatami =

Iranian military officer (born 1966)

Amir Amir Hatami
- امیر حاتمی
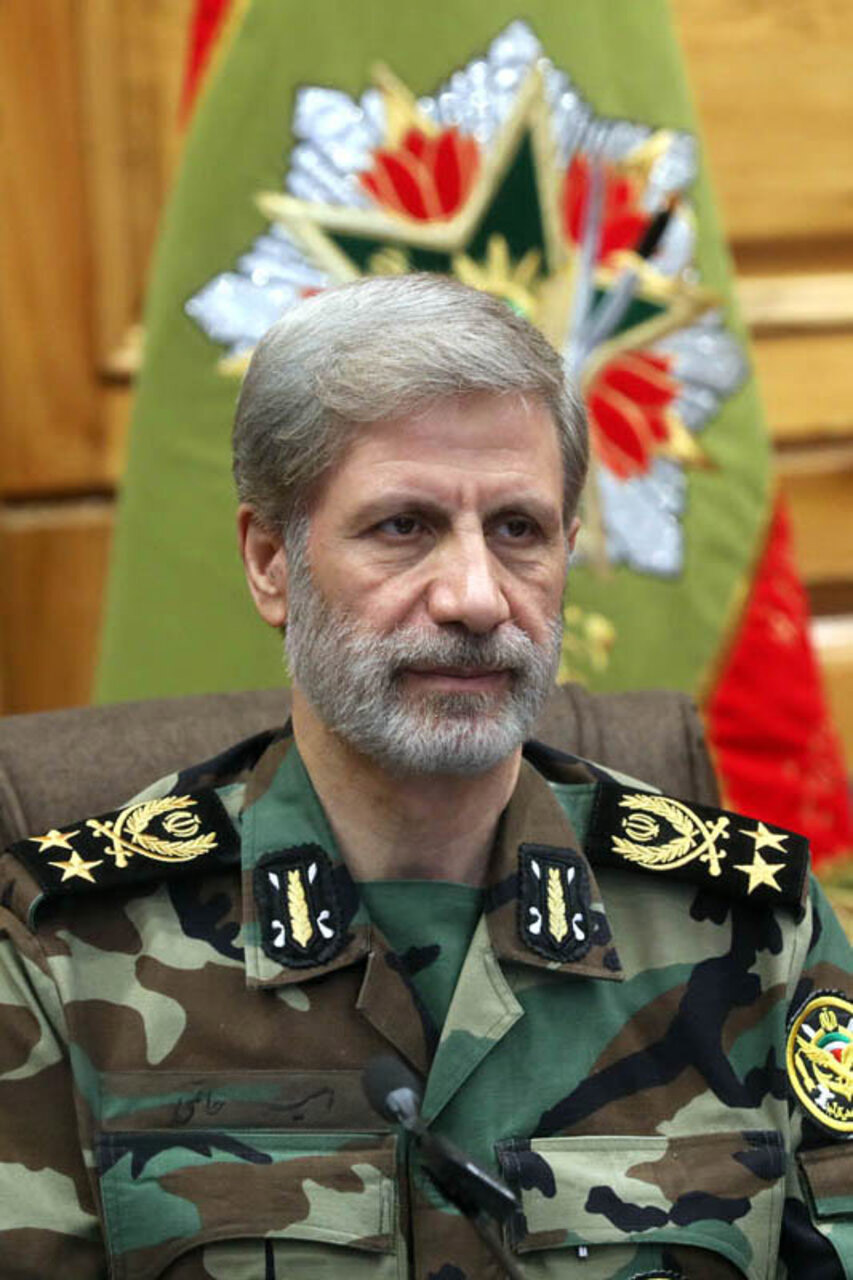
- Amir Hatami in 2025

5th Commander-in-Chief of the Islamic Republic of Iran Army
- Incumbent
- Assumed office 14 June 2025
- President: Masoud Pezeshkian
- Supreme Leader: Ali Khamenei; Mojtaba Khamenei
- Preceded by: Abdolrahim Mousavi

Advisor to the Commander-in-Chief of the Armed Forces on Army Affairs
- In office 25 August 2021 – 14 June 2025
- President: Ebrahim Raisi; Mohammad Mokhber (acting); Masoud Pezeshkian
- Supreme Leader: Ali Khamenei
- Preceded by: Vacant
- Succeeded by: Vacant

Minister of Defence and Armed Forces Logistics
- In office 20 August 2017 – 25 August 2021
- President: Hassan Rouhani
- Supreme Leader: Ali Khamenei
- Preceded by: Hossein Dehghan
- Succeeded by: Mohammad-Reza Gharaei Ashtiani

Deputy Minister of Defence and Armed Forces Logistics
- In office 2013–2017
- President: Hassan Rouhani
- Supreme Leader: Ali Khamenei
- Preceded by: Majid Bokayi
- Succeeded by: Ghasem Taghizadeh

Senior Advisor to the Chief of the General Staff of the Armed Forces at the Khatam al-Anbiya Central Headquarters
- In office 2013–2013
- President: Mahmoud Ahmadinejad
- Supreme Leader: Ali Khamenei
- Preceded by: Mostafa Salami
- Succeeded by: Mohammad Jafar Asadi

Deputy Head of Pillars and Joint Affairs of the General Staff
- In office 2011–2013
- President: Mahmoud Ahmadinejad
- Supreme Leader: Ali Khamenei
- Preceded by: Office Established
- Succeeded by: Abdolali Pourshasb

Deputy for Human Resources of the General Staff
- In office 2006–2011
- President: Mahmoud Ahmadinejad
- Supreme Leader: Ali Khamenei
- Preceded by: Hossein Yasini
- Succeeded by: Mohammad-Hassan Bagheri

Head of the High Advisory Group to the Commander-in-Chief of the Army
- In office 2005–2006
- President: Mohammad Khatami; Mahmoud Ahmadinejad
- Supreme Leader: Ali Khamenei
- Preceded by: Siavash Javadian
- Succeeded by: ?

Director of Artesh Military Intelligence
- In office 1998–2005
- President: Mohammad Khatami
- Supreme Leader: Ali Khamenei
- Preceded by: Mohammad-Hassan Nami
- Succeeded by: Akbar Dianatfar

Personal details
- Born: 1966 (age 59–60) Zanjan, Pahlavi Iran
- Education: Officers' Academy; University of Command and Staff; Supreme National Defense University

Military service
- Allegiance: Iran
- Branch/service: Ground Forces; Basij
- Years of service: 1980–Present
- Rank: Major General
- Battles/wars: Iran–Iraq War; Operation Mersad; War in Afghanistan (2001–2021); 2001 uprising in Herat; Insurgency in Sistan and Balochistan; Syrian civil war; Iranian intervention in Syria; War in Iraq (2013–2017); Iranian intervention in Iraq; Iran–PJAK conflict; Western Iran clashes; 2019–2021 Persian Gulf crisis; 2024 Iran–Israel conflict; Twelve-Day War; 2026 Iran war

Amir Hatami (Persian: امیر حاتمی, born 1966) is an Iranian military officer who serves as the commander-in-chief of the Islamic Republic of Iran Army. Holding the rank of major general, Hatami was appointed commander-in-chief following the promotion of Abdolrahim Mousavi to Chief of the General Staff of the Armed Forces after the assassination of his predecessor Mohammad Bagheri in the Twelve-Day War.

Hatami is also an Advisor to the Commander-in-Chief of the Iranian Armed Forces of Army Affairs and the former minister of defense of Iran.

== Biography ==
Amir Hatami was born in 1966 in Nimowar (village of Zanjan). At the age of 14, Hatami joined the Basij as a volunteer and began serving in the Iranian Army Ground Forces in 1984. After the war, he entered the Imam Ali Officers' Academy in 1989 and graduated in defense science management.

Hatami previously served as the head of the Army's international relations office, as well as a deputy in the armed forces general staff.

He was nominated as Minister of Defense by President Hassan Rouhani on 8 August 2017 and received a vote of confidence from Parliament on 20 August 2017, with 261 votes in favor, 10 against, 13 abstentions, and 4 invalid votes. He was the first Minister of Defense with an Artesh background in more than two decades, as the position had been held exclusively by Revolutionary Guard officers since 1989.

== See also ==
- List of Iranian two-star generals since 1979

Military offices
Preceded by Abdolrahim Mousavi	Commander-in-Chief of the Islamic Republic of Iran Army; 14 June 2025–present	Incumbent
Preceded by Vacant	Advisor to the Commander-in-Chief of the Armed Forces on Army Affairs; 25 August 2021–14 June 2025	Succeeded by Vacant
Preceded by Mostafa Salami	Senior Advisor to the Chief of the General Staff of the Armed Forces at the Khatam al-Anbiya Central Headquarters; 2013–2013	Succeeded by Mohammad Jafar Asadi
New title	Deputy Head of Pillars and Joint Affairs of the of the General Staff; 2011–2013	Succeeded by Abdolali Pourshasb
Preceded by Hossein Yasini	Deputy for Human Resources of the General Staff; 2006–2011	Succeeded by Mohammad-Hassan Bagheri
Preceded by Siavash Javadian	Head of the High Advisory Group to the Commander-in-Chief of the Army; 2005–2006	Succeeded by ?
Unknown Last known title holder: Mohammad-Hassan Nami	Intelligence Deputy of the Islamic Republic of Iran Army; 1998–2005	Succeeded by Akbar Dianatfar
Government offices
Preceded by Hossein Dehghan	Minister of Defense; 20 August 2017–25 August 2021	Succeeded by Mohammad-Reza Gharaei Ashtiani
Preceded by Majid Bokayi	Deputy Minister of Defense; 2013–2017	Succeeded by Ghasem Taghizadeh
