= Central Provost of Islamic Republic of Iran Army =

- دژبان کل ارتش جمهوری اسلامی ایران
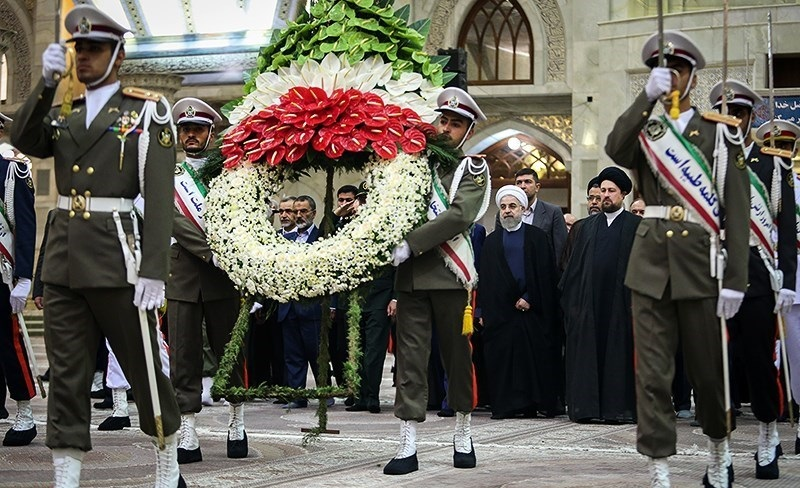
- Honor guard at Mausoleum of Ruhollah Khomeini
- Country: Iran
- Branch: Joint Staff
- Type: Military police, Honor guard
- Role: Provost, Public duties
- Part of: Artesh
- Garrison/HQ: Tehran
- Anniversaries: 18 April

Commanders
- Provost marshal: Amir Sartip II Hamid Samimipour
- Adjutant of President of IRI: Amir Sartip II Mohammad-Reza Hosseini

Insignia
- Ceremonial Flag

Central Provost of Islamic Republic of Iran Army (Persian: دژبان مرکز ارتش جمهوری اسلامی ایران; Dežbān Markaz), acronymed DEJAJA (Persian: دژاجا), is the provost and military police with an authority within all military branches of Islamic Republic of Iran Army (Artesh). The provost is a subdivision to the military's Joint Staff and has seniority over designated provosts —like the "Sea Police" (Persian: پلیس دریائی) of Navy and the "Air Police" (Persian: پلیس هوائی) in the Air Force.

== Structure ==
- Presidential Ceremony Guard Company, Imam Khomeini Barracks
- Protection Company
- Order and Security Company

== Ceremonial duties ==
The provost is also responsible for performing ceremonial duties; it has honor guard units, including the "Presidential Ceremony Guard" (Persian: گارد تشریفات ریاست جمهوری), which maneuvers during official trips of the President of Iran and during visits by heads of state. Protection Company in Saad Abad is responsible for the protection of places such as the palace, museum and gardens under the complex of the palace.

At the same time, this unit is responsible for the protection of places such as Saad Abad Palace and Museum and the establishment of order and security in Tehran's Behesht-e Zahra. During the Iran-Iraq war, all the prisoners of war were handed over to DEJAJA.

== Gallery ==
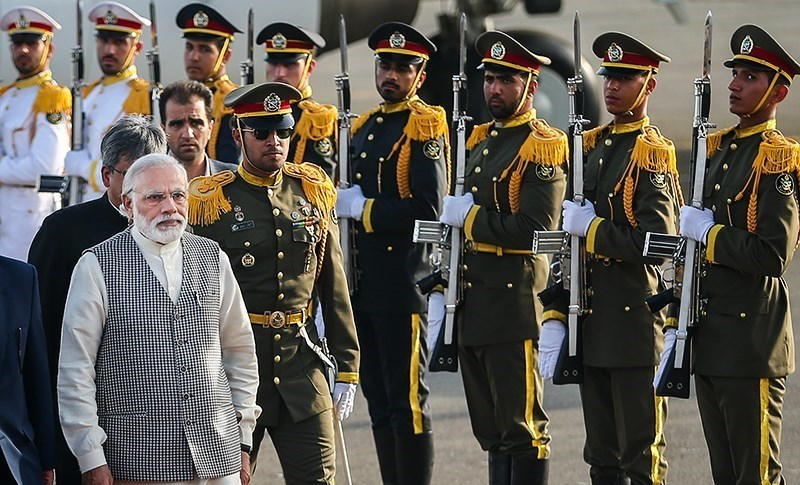

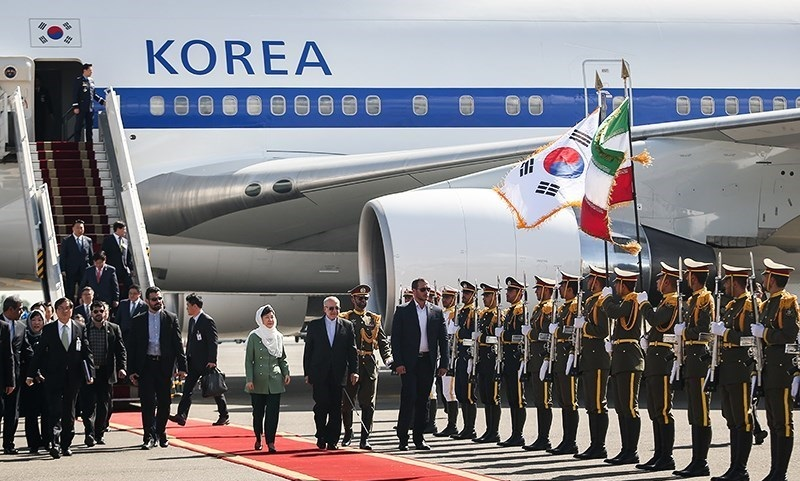

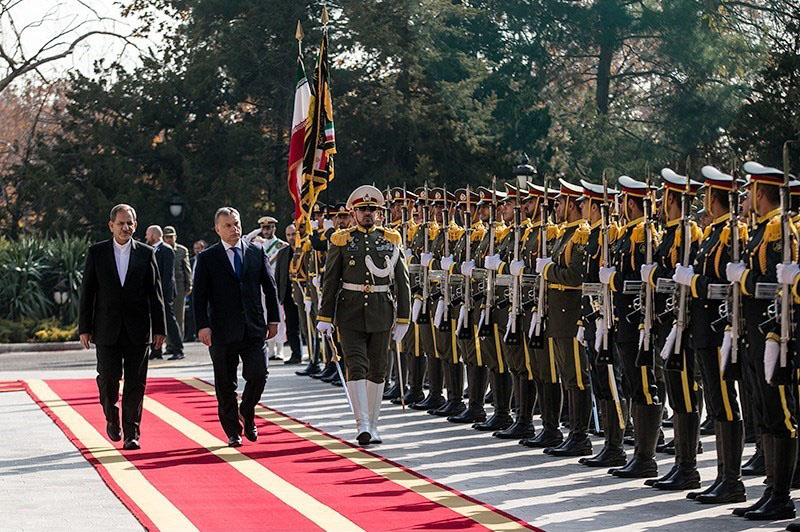

== See also ==
- General Provost of Army of the Guardians of the Islamic Revolution
