= 25th Takavar Brigade =

Iranian army special forces unit

25th Airborne Special Forces Brigade
- تیپ ۲۵ نیرو مخصوص
- Founded: 1959
- Country: Iran
- Branch: Islamic Republic of Iran Ground Forces
- Type: Airborne forces, special forces
- Role: Special operations Irregular warfare Hostage rescue Counter-terrorism; Reconnaissance
- Size: Brigade (8 battalions)
- Part of: 21st Commando Division (until 1991)
- Headquarters: Baghshah (formerly); Afsariyeh; Mehrabad International Airport
- Nickname: "Green Berets" (کلاه سبزها)
- Colors: Green
- March: 18 April (National Army Day)
- Engagements: Dhofar Rebellion; Post-Revolution clashes in Iran; Iran–Iraq War

Commanders
- Current commander: Colonel Ali Delavar

Aircraft flown
- Multirole helicopter: Bell 214; Bell UH-1N Twin Huey (Bell 212)
- Transport: Lockheed C-130 Hercules; Boeing CH-47 Chinook

25th Airborne Special Forces Brigade (Persian: تیپ ۲۵ نیرو مخصوص), is an airborne, special forces unit of the Iranian Army established in 1959.

The unit's first operation was during the Dhofar Rebellion in Oman. After the 1979 Revolution in Iran, it was a participant in the post-Revolution clashes. As part of the 21st Commando Division, the unit was extensively used in various operations of the Iran–Iraq War of the 1980s. Recently, some members have been active in the Syrian Civil War. The brigade has also been employed for hostage rescue and counter-terrorism purposes inside Iran. 25th Takavar Brigade' (Persian: تیپ ۲۵ تکاور) is a Takavar separate brigade of the Ground Forces of Islamic Republic of Iran Army based in Pasveh, West Azerbaijan province. The unit supplied aid for 2012 East Azerbaijan earthquakes.
