= Mohammad Bagheri (general) =

Iranian senior military leader (1960–2025)

Sardar Seyyed Mohammad Bagheri
- محمد باقری
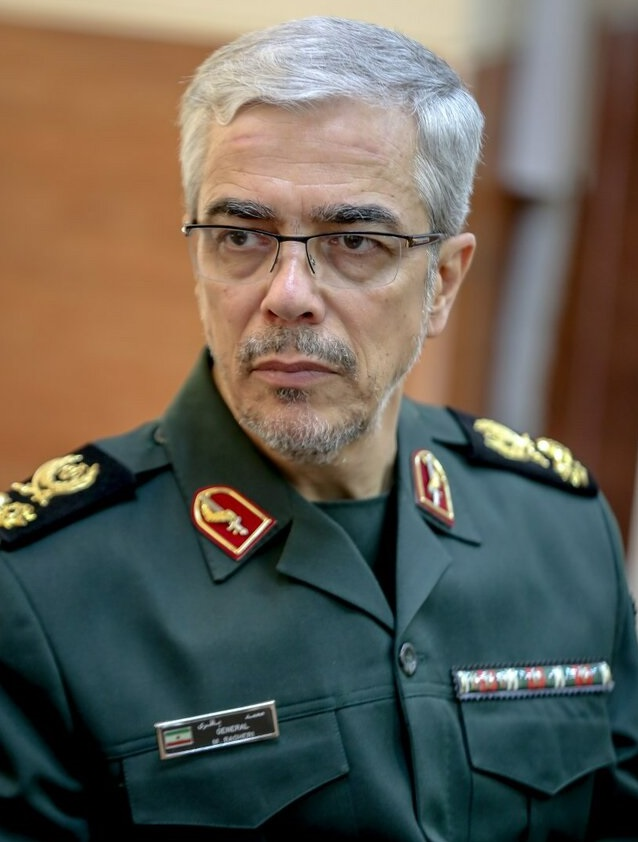
- Bagheri in 2019

2nd Chief of the General Staff of the Iranian Armed Forces
- In office 28 June 2016 – 13 June 2025
- President: Hassan Rouhani; Ebrahim Raisi; Mohammad Mokhber (acting); Masoud Pezeshkian
- Supreme Leader: Ali Khamenei
- Preceded by: Hassan Firouzabadi
- Succeeded by: Habibollah Sayyari (acting); Abdolrahim Mousavi

Deputy for Joint Affairs and Structures of the General Staff
- In office 2014 – 28 June 2016
- President: Hassan Rouhani
- Supreme Leader: Ali Khamenei

Deputy for Intelligence and Operations of the General Staff
- In office 2002–2014
- President: Mohammad Khatami; Mahmoud Ahmadinejad; Hassan Rouhani
- Supreme Leader: Ali Khamenei
- Preceded by: Behrouz Soleiman-jah
- Succeeded by: ?

Deputy Coordinator of the Khatam al-Anbiya Central Headquarters
- In office 2007–2016
- President: Mahmoud Ahmadinejad; Hassan Rouhani
- Supreme Leader: Ali Khamenei
- Preceded by: ?
- Succeeded by: Ali Shadmani

Deputy for Intelligence and Operations of the IRGC Ground Forces
- In office 1985–1989
- President: Ali Khameneid
- Prime Minister: Mir-Hossein Mousavi
- Supreme Leader: Ruhollah Khomeini
- Preceded by: Office Established
- Succeeded by: Gholamreza Mehrabi

Personal details
- Born: Mohammad-Hossein Afshordi; 3 November 1960 Tehran, Pahlavi Iran
- Died: 13 June 2025 (aged 64) Tehran, Iran
- Cause of death: Assassination by airstrike
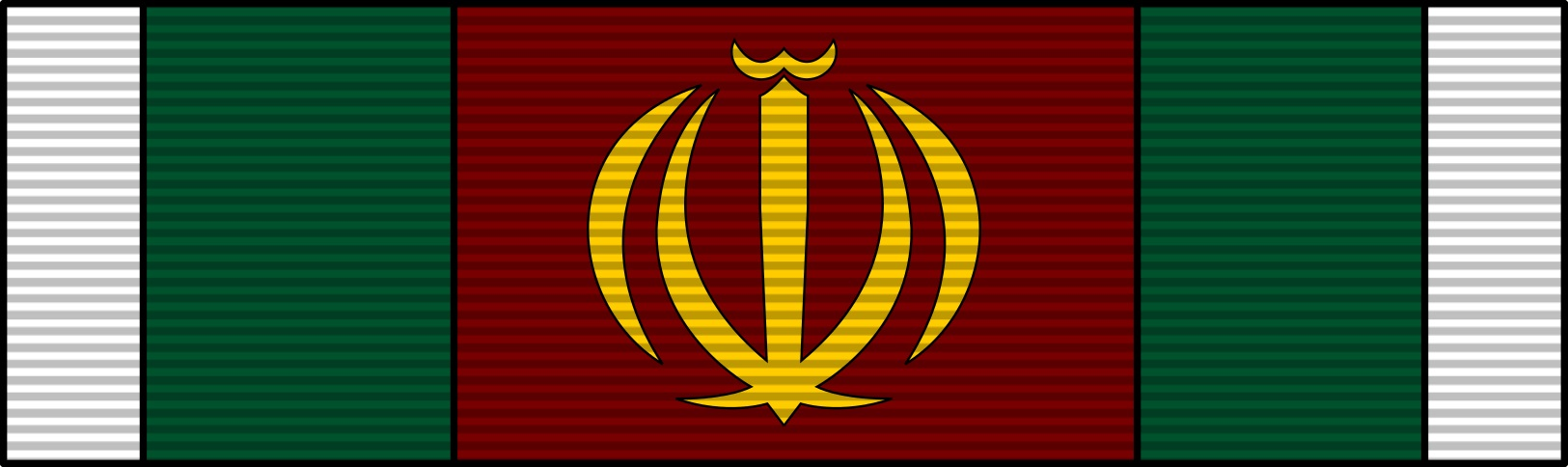
- Awards: Order of Fath (3) Order of Nasr

Military service
- Allegiance: Iran
- Branch/service: IRGC
- Years of service: 1979–2025
- Rank: Major General; Lieutenant General (posthumously)
- Unit: Ground Forces
- Battles/wars: 1979 Kurdish Rebellion; Iran–Iraq War (WIA); KDPI insurgency (1989–1996); Insurgency in Sistan and Balochistan; Syrian civil war; Iranian intervention; War in Iraq (2013–2017); Iranian intervention in Iraq; Iran–PJAK conflict; Western Iran clashes; 2019–2021 Persian Gulf crisis; 2024 Iran–Israel conflict; Twelve-Day War X

Mohammad Bagheri (Persian: محمد باقری; 3 November 1960 – 13 June 2025; born Mohammad-Hossein Afshordi;محمدحسین افشردی) was an Iranian military officer in the Islamic Revolutionary Guard Corps (IRGC), who served as the Chief of the General Staff of the Iranian Armed Forces from 2016 to 2025. The chief of staff is considered the highest ranking military officer in the Islamic Republic of Iran and is responsible for the coordination and supervision of Iran’s regular army (Artesh) and the Islamic Revolutionary Guard Corps (IRGC). Bagheri was killed along with other senior officers during a series of airstrikes launched by Israel on 13 June 2025. He was the highest ranking military officer in Iran at the time of his death.

Mohammad Bagheri was one of Iran's most prominent military commanders and served as Chief of Staff of the Armed Forces of the Islamic Republic of Iran from 2016 until his death in June 2025. He was born into a revolutionary and religious family in Tehran. He was the younger brother of Hassan Bagheri (Gholamhossein Afshordi), the founder of the IRGC's Operations Intelligence Unit. Mohammad Bagheri played a key role in strengthening Iran's defense capabilities, with more than 45 years of service in the IRGC. He was killed in the early hours of Friday, June 13, 2025, at the age of 65, following an attack on Tehran by Israel.

Bagheri began his military career in 1979 with the Islamic Revolutionary Guard Corps and served during the Iran–Iraq War. From 2002 to 2014, he was the Deputy for Information and Operations of the General Staff of the Armed Forces of the Islamic Republic of Iran. Additionally, he served as the Deputy Coordinator of the Khatam al-Anbiya Central Headquarters from 2007 to 2016. Between 2014 and 2016, he held the position of Deputy for Joint Affairs and Structures of the General Staff of the Armed Forces of the Islamic Republic of Iran.

He was a lecturer at Tarbiat Modares University and a faculty member of the Supreme National Defense University of Iran. The United States Department of the Treasury placed him on its sanctions list in November 2019. The Canadian government sanctioned him for human rights violations in Iran on October 3, 2022. The European Union also sanctioned him in October 2022 for sending a drone to Russia for use in the invasion of Ukraine.

== Personal life ==
Bagheri was born in 1960. His elder brother, Hassan Bagheri, was a commander in the Iran–Iraq War, in which he was killed in action.

Mohammad Bagheri (Mohammad Hossein Afshordi) was born in 1960 near the Khorasan Square in Tehran, Iran and spent his childhood and adolescence there. His family origins trace back to the village of Afshord in Heris County, East Azerbaijan province, Iran. Mohammad Bagheri began his career in the Islamic Revolutionary Guard Corps (IRGC) in 1979 as a member of the IRGC's personnel unit and later served in the intelligence and operations unit during the Iran–Iraq War.

== Educations ==
Mohammad Bagheri was in his final year of high school at the time of the Iranian revolution. After the revolution, he switched to technical courses at the university and was accepted into the Mechanical Engineering Department of the Polytechnic University. He continued his studies until the Cultural Revolution. Iran universities were closed in the spring of 1980 due to the Cultural Revolution. Bagheri began working in the IRGC in the summer of 1980.

Bagheri holds a PhD in political geography from Tarbiat Modares University and is a former faculty member of the Supreme National Defense University. In addition to his executive responsibilities, he taught at both the Supreme National Defense University and Tarbiat Modares University as a full professor. Bagheri is one of the founders of the Iranian Association of Geopolitics, alongside Mohammad Bagher Ghalibaf, Yahya Rahim Safavi, and Gholam Ali Rashid.

== Careers ==
Mohammad Bagheri, a military intelligence expert with experience dating back to the Iran–Iraq War (1980–1988), held a Ph.D. in political geography and reportedly taught at Iran's Supreme National Defense University. In 1980, he joined the Islamic Revolutionary Guard Corps (IRGC).

Bagheri was a member of a group identified by the American Enterprise Institute (AEI) as the IRGC Command Network, which included other commanders such as Mohammad Ali Jafari, Ali Fadavi, and Gholam Ali Rashid (who was also killed on 13 June 2025). According to AEI's Critical Threats Project, as of 2016 the group dominated “the upper echelons of Iran's military and controls planning, operations, intelligence, covert and irregular warfare operations, and internal security." He was promoted from his previous position as deputy chief of staff for intelligence and operations in the General Staff of Armed Forces of the Islamic Republic of Iran on 28 June 2016, replacing Hassan Firouzabadi.

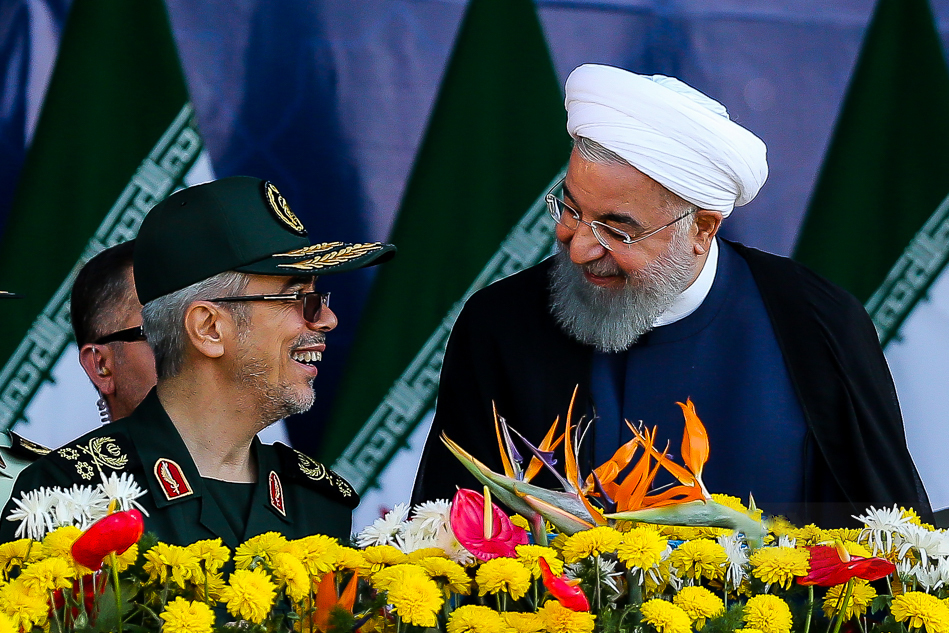
Bagheri with Iranian President Hassan Rouhani on 22 September 2018

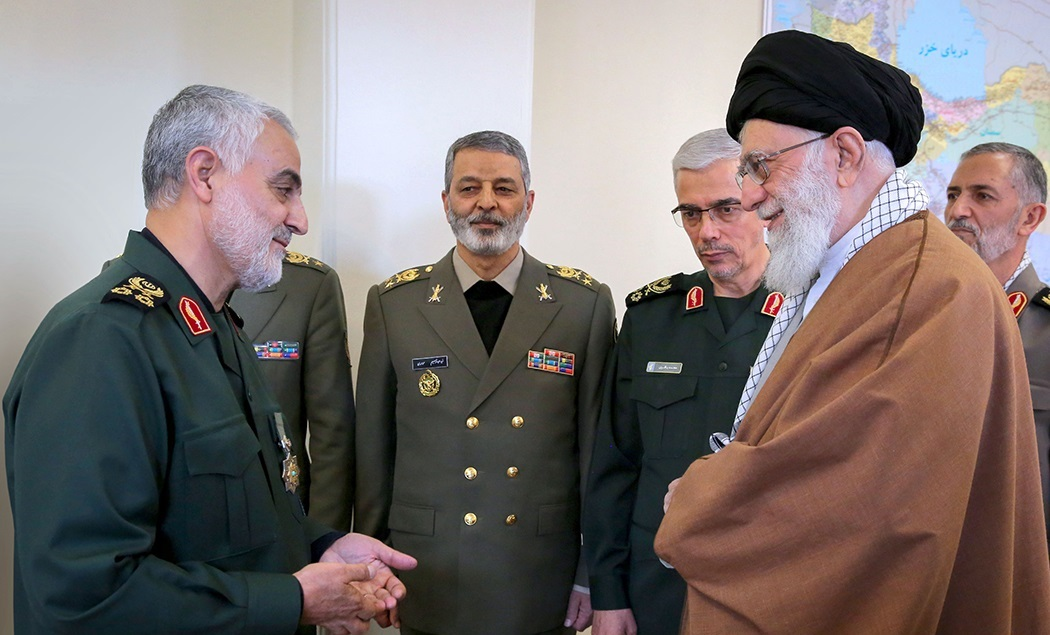
Bagheri with Qasem Soleimani and Ayatollah Ali Khamenei on 11 March 2019

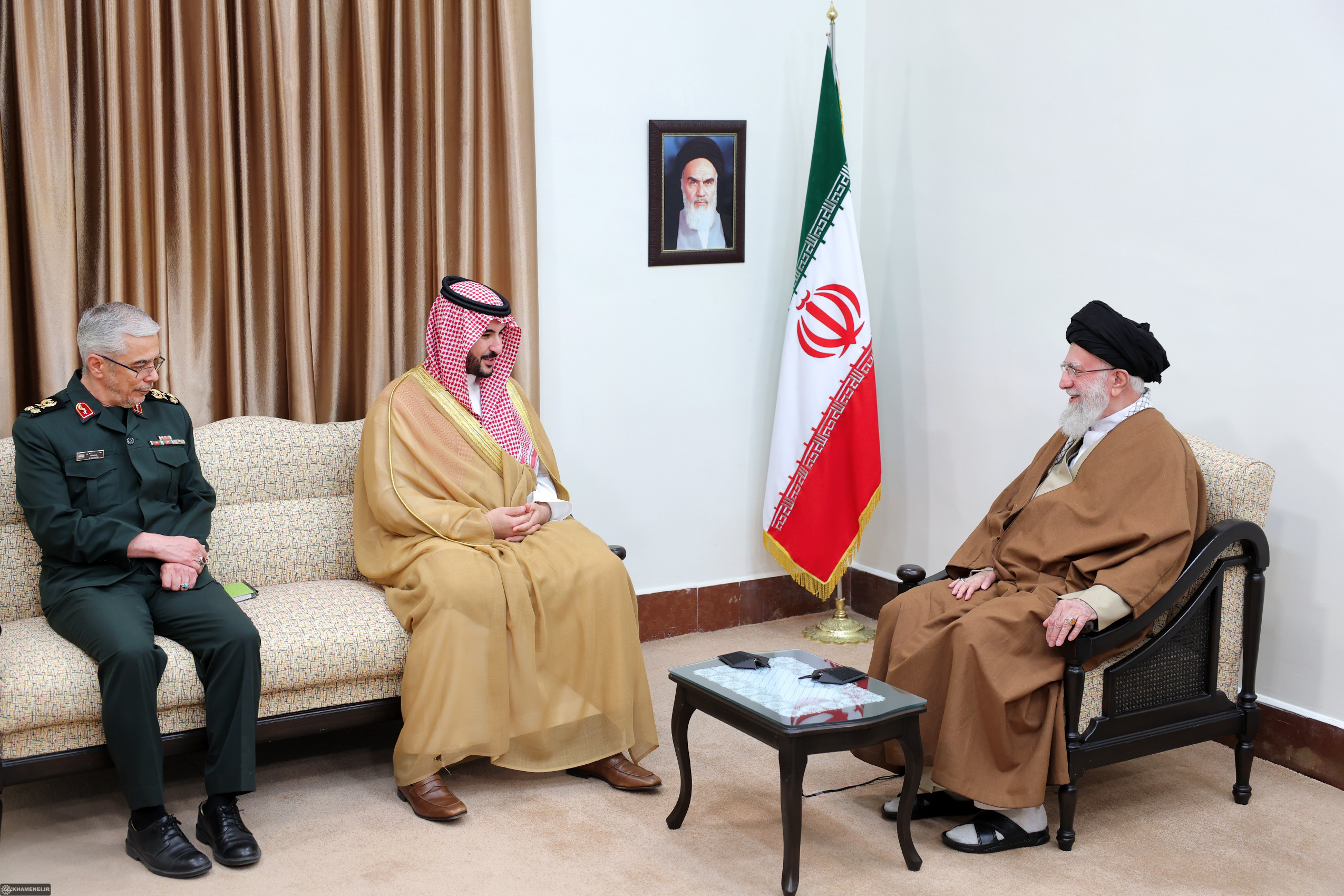
Bagheri with Saudi Arabia's Defense Minister Khalid bin Salman and Ayatollah Khamenei on 17 April 2025

In October 2017, he visited Iranian troops in Aleppo Governorate in northern Syria.

In February 2022, Bagheri announced that Iran would continue advancing its ballistic missile programme, both "in terms of quantity and quality".

On 21 October 2022, a White House press release stated that Iranian troops were in Crimea assisting Russia in launching drone attacks. Bagheri was the commander overseeing the Iranian army branches supplying Russia with drones.

On 3 December 2023, Bagheri suggested during meetings in Baghdad that Iran might directly intervene in the escalating tensions with the United States, in support of efforts to expel American forces from the region.

On 17 April 2025, Bagheri held talks in Tehran with Saudi Arabia’s Minister of Defense, Khalid bin Salman Al Saud, in the highest profile talks between the two countries in decades.

Mohammad Bagheri held significant responsibilities during the Iran–Iraq War. After the war ended, he remained committed to his path and continued to serve the Islamic Republic of Iran. His military and academic background includes:

=== Military records ===
Mohammad Bagheri's major military activities are as follows:

- Operational forces in the early stages of the Iran–Iraq War
- Information Officer of the Islamic Revolutionary Guard Corps Divisions: since 1980
- Information Officer and Operations Officer of the Islamic Revolutionary Guard Corps Ground Forces: from 1983 until the end of the Iran–Iraq War
- Information Officer at the Karbala Headquarters: from 1983 until the end of the Iran–Iraq War
- Information Officer at the Khatam al-Anbiya Central Headquarters: from 1983 until the end of the Iran–Iraq War
- Chief of the Intelligence Department of the General Staff of the Armed Forces of the Islamic Republic of Iran
- Deputy Chief of Intelligence and Operations of the General Staff of the Armed Forces of the Islamic Republic of Iran: from 2002 to 2014
- Chief of Joint Affairs and Structures, General Staff of the Armed Forces of the Islamic Republic of Iran: from 2014 to 2016
- Deputy Coordinator of the Khatam al-Anbiya Central Headquarters: In 2007, Bagheri was appointed Deputy Coordinator of the Khatam al-Anbiya Central Headquarters
- Operation Designer and Approver: Mohammad Bagheri played a key role in designing and approving the 1996 operation to attack Iraqi soil, aimed at confronting terrorist groups
- Chief of Staff of the Armed Forces of the Islamic Republic of Iran: On June 28, 2016, by order of Supreme Leader of Iran, Ali Khamenei, Mohammad Bagheri was appointed as the Chief of Staff of the Armed Forces of the Islamic Republic of Iran, replacing Major General Hassan Firouzabadi. Bagheri held this position until his death on June 13, 2025

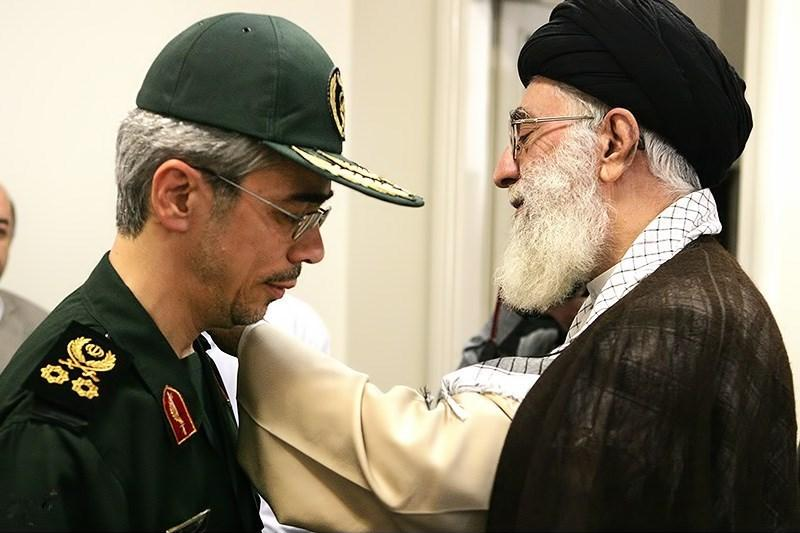
Mohammad Bagheri receiving the rank of Major General from the Leader of the Islamic Republic of Iran in 2008.

==== Military rank ====
Mohammad Bagheri received the rank of Major General from the Supreme Leader of the Islamic Republic of Iran in 2008. Bagheri was promoted to the rank of Major General in 2008, alongside Mostafa Izadi. He is one of the few Iranian military commanders to have attained the rank of Major General before serving as Commander-in-Chief of the Islamic Revolutionary Guard Corps, Commander-in-Chief of the Army, or Chief of Staff of the Armed Forces.

==== Chief of Staff ====
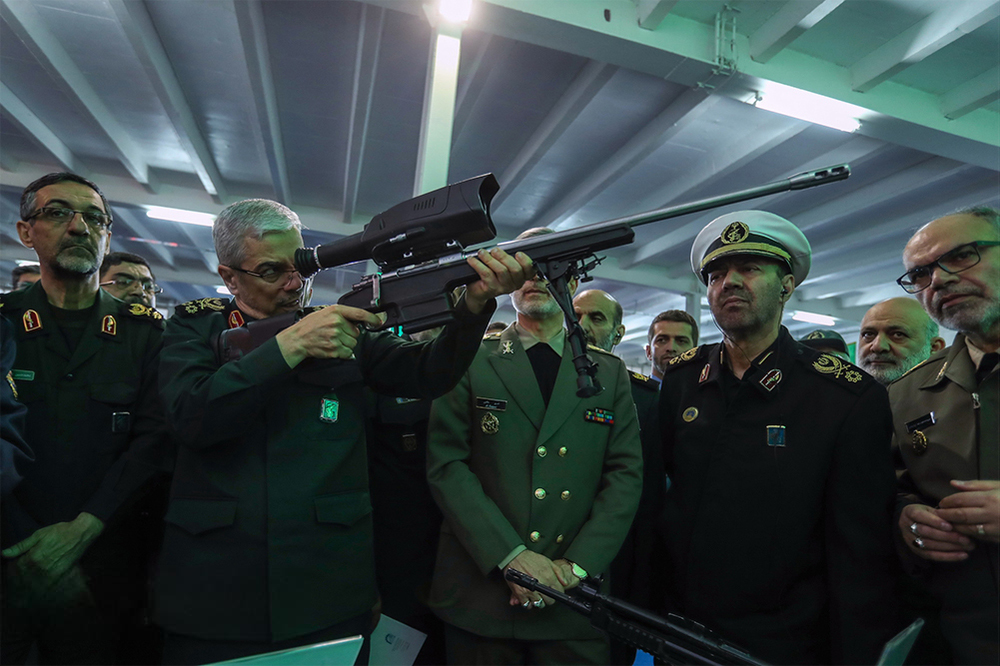
Mohammad Bagheri at the Armed Forces Logistic's Defense Achievements Exhibition, December 05, 2019.

Mohammad Bagheri replaced Hassan Firouzabadi as Chief of Staff of the General Staff of the Armed Forces of the Islamic Republic of Iran on June 28, 2016, by order of Supreme Leader of Iran, Ali Khamenei. He previously served as Deputy Chief of Staff for Intelligence and Operations, as well as Deputy Chief of Staff for Joint Affairs of the Islamic Republic of Iran Armed Forces.

From 2002 to 2016, Mohammad Bagheri served as Deputy Chief of Staff for Intelligence and Operations of the General Staff of the Armed Forces of the Islamic Republic of Iran and as Deputy Coordinator of the Khatam al-Anbiya Central Headquarters, where he renovated the intelligence and operational structures of the Armed Forces of Iran. During his tenure as Chief of Staff of the General Staff of the Armed Forces of the Islamic Republic of Iran (from June 28, 2016, to June 13, 2025), Bagheri played a significant role in integrating intelligence, developing missile capabilities, strengthening cyber warfare capacities, and advancing Iran’s cross-border operations. By formulating and presenting new, scientific security theories, he contributed substantially to the strategic enhancement of the Iranian Defense Forces. Bagheri has been a fundamental and key figure in advancing Iran’s military self-sufficiency.

Mohammad Bagheri's innovative initiatives during his tenure as Chief of Staff of the Armed Forces of the Islamic Republic of Iran included strengthening cyber infrastructure and developing indigenous technologies, such as drones and missile systems. He accelerated the advancement of the scientific and operational capabilities of the Armed Forces of Iran by emphasizing the education and training of specialized personnel. As a researcher in political geography and geopolitics, Bagheri also provided critical analyses that contributed to the development of Iran's grand defense strategies. His establishment of the Iranian Association of Geopolitics and participation in scientific conferences demonstrated his commitment to integrating theoretical knowledge with practical experience in the defense system of Iran.

==== Awards and badges ====
This section includes Mohammad Bagheri's official insignia and awards, which were worn on his uniform. His civilian and unofficial awards are not listed here.

Emblems of the arm
General Staff of the Armed Forces of the Islamic Republic of Iran

Badges bar

Names of badges

	Order of Fath (Grade 1)	
Order of Nasr (Grade 2)	Order of Fath (Grade 3)	Order of Fath (Grade 3)

=== Scientific records ===
Mohammad Bagheri's major scientific and academic activities are as follows:

- PhD in Political Geography and Geopolitics from Tarbiat Modares University
- Faculty member at the Supreme National Defense University, holding the rank of full professor
- Teaching at the Supreme National Defense University as a full professor
- Teaching at Tarbiat Modares University
- Member of the Scientific Committee of Political Geography of Iran
- Member of the Founding Board of the Iranian Geopolitical Association
- Author of numerous scientific articles in the fields of geopolitics and political geography

==== Publications ====
Mohammad Bagheri has published works on the geopolitics of the Caucasus, the West Asian region, and international maritime law in the Persian Gulf and the Strait of Hormuz, including the following:

- A study and analysis of the US preventive war guidelines in Southwest Asia
- Determining the factors affecting the principles of the operational guidelines of the Islamic Republic of Iran's ground forces in asymmetric and symmetric combat
- Military strategies for confronting a possible future US war against the Islamic Republic of Iran in the Persian Gulf
- The function of the Taliban deterrence model in the US preventive war against Afghanistan in 2001 (with an emphasis on internal Afghan factors)
- Explanation of effective indicators in border management
- Geopolitical threats affecting the formulation of the defense strategy of the Islamic Republic of Iran Towards Turkey
- The impact of Shiite geopolitical factors on the expansion of the influence of the Islamic Revolution
- Determining the geopolitical factors of Turkey affecting the formulation of the defense strategy of the Islamic Republic of Iran
- Sustainable security in the geopolitical region of the Persian Gulf in light of the instability of convergent and divergent forces
- Explanation of the boundaries of the computer space and their management strategy
- The structure of the regional power system in the Middle East (with emphasis on the superior countries of the region)
- A theoretical model for designing a defense strategy based on geopolitical factors
- Investigating the degree of conformity and differences between the law of the maritime zones of the Islamic Republic of Iran in the Persian Gulf and the Sea of Oman (1993) and the Convention on the Law of the Sea (1982)
- Analysis of the geopolitical situation of the Caucasus; a platform for formulating a more appropriate foreign policy in the region
- Determining the geopolitical factors of Turkey affecting the formulation of the defense strategy of the Islamic Republic of Iran
- Explanation of the political outcome of transferring the exploitation of the Makran coast to domestic investment

* Note: Most of Bagheri's writings is in Persian language, but some of them translated into English too.

== Views ==
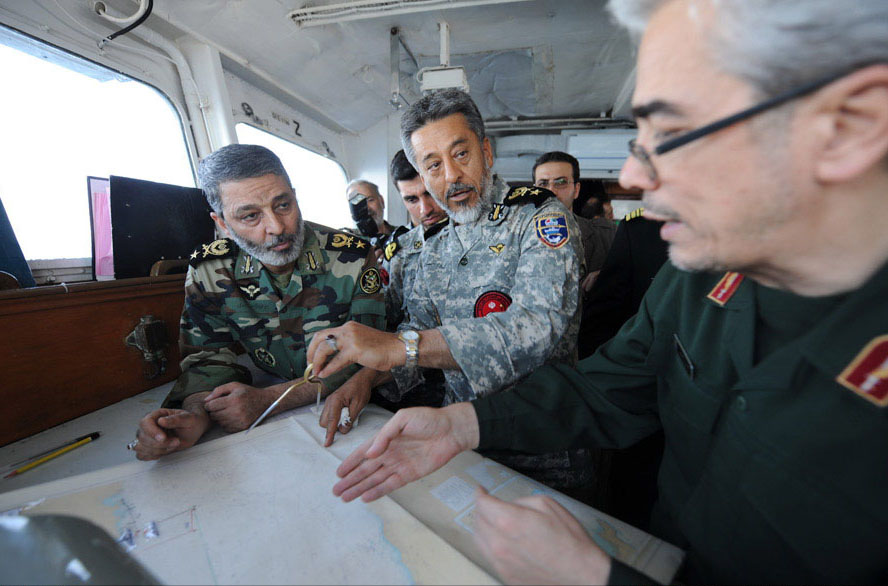
Major general Mohammad Bagheri, brigadier general Habibollah Sayyari and brigadier general Abdolrahim Mousavi reviewing plans in the "Velayat-90 Naval Exercise", December 2011.

One of the topics discussed regarding Bagheri is his strategic theories, including the "Makran Coast Development Plan" and even a futuristic vision for the "Antarctica". As the Deputy Chief of Staff for Joint Affairs of the Armed Forces of Iran, Bagheri presented his ideas at the closing ceremony of the "First National Conference on Science, Marine Industries and Sustainable Development of the Makoran Coast", held in Chabahar, on the "Development of the Makran Coast" and the "Maritime Power of the Islamic Republic of Iran". Bagheri stated there:

"We have direct access to the open waters of Antarctica from the coast of Makran, with no land obstructing the way. Additionally, we can claim sovereignty over a portion of Antarctica in accordance with international law."

=== War ===
On the night of Saturday, September 26, 2020, at the start of a television program on the Channel IRIB TV1 of the Islamic Republic of Iran's Radio and Television Department, Major General Bagheri addressed the reasons behind the war imposed on the Iranian nation by Iraq. He stated there:

"War is a sinister and unjustifiable phenomenon that humans should reject, especially the Iranian nation, which has a rich and proud history. The Iran–Iraq War was a conflict imposed on the Iranian people. A review of Iran’s 200-year history shows that the Iranian nation has never been aggressive or initiated war. The eight-year conflict between us and Iraq, was a defensive struggle for us in which Iran was solely protecting itself.

— "Negah-e Yek Program", IRIB TV1, Islamic Republic of Iran Television, Saturday night, September 26, 2020.

== Name change ==
The older brother of Mohammad Bagheri (born Mohammad Hossein Afshordi), was Hassan Bagheri (born Gholamhossein Afshordi). Hassan Bagheri was the first head of intelligence and operations for the Islamic Revolutionary Guard Corps (IRGC). Mohammad Bagheri provided the following explanation for changing his surname from "Afshordi" to "Bagheri":

In the first month of the Iran–Iraq War, I went to Ahvaz and appeared on the Khuzestan front. My brother reminded me that his name had been changed to "Hassan Bagheri" at the front to avoid identification, and since your name was Afshordi, we should not be confused. I tried to use my real name, but our faces were so similar that everyone realized we were brothers. At the same time, Gholamhossein was very insistent that his name remain undisclosed. To protect his identity, I also changed my name and became "Mohammad Bagheri". Out of respect for my brother, this name stayed with us. Davoud Karimi, then head of Southern Operations, would later joke with us, saying, "Cousin's brother."

== Sanctions ==
On 8 April 2019, the United States designated Iran's Revolutionary Guards as a foreign terrorist organization. Prime Minister Benjamin Netanyahu of Israel immediately thanked President Donald Trump on Twitter. Bagheri said, "We consider the U.S. troops in West Asia to be terrorists and if they do a damn thing, we will confront them vigorously."

In 2022, following harsh suppression of Iranian protesters during the Mahsa Amini protests, Bagheri was sanctioned by the United States and Canada. He was also sanctioned by the United Kingdom in 2022 in relation to the Russo-Ukrainian War.

In October 2022, the European Union sanctioned Bagheri for his involvement in providing drones to Russia, used in attacks against Ukraine. The sanctions included asset freezes and travel bans. Bagheri publicly mocked the EU sanctions, saying:

"I have a humanitarian proposal for the European Union. I give them the permission to confiscate all the properties and assets of Maj. Gen. Mohammad Bagheri from all bank accounts in the world and use them to buy coal for European citizens. A difficult winter is ahead".

The EU Council Decision stated that Bagheri had played a key role in strengthening defence cooperation with Russia. The report says "He also participated in the development of Mohajer-6 drones and their supply to the Russian Federation for their use in the war of aggression against Ukraine. Therefore, Major-General Mohammad Hossein Bagheri is responsible for supporting actions which undermine or threaten the territorial integrity, sovereignty and independence of Ukraine."

== Role in key military operations ==
Bagheri commanded pivotal Iran–Iraq War operations, including Operation Beit ol-Moqaddas (1982) and Operation Dawn 8 (1986), which reclaimed strategic territories in western Iran.

== Contributions to missile and drone programs ==
As Deputy for Strategic Planning (2000s), Bagheri oversaw advancements in Iran's ballistic missile and drone programs, later central to its "missile shield" doctrine.

== Strategic doctrines on U.S./Israel ==
Bagheri has consistently promoted "asymmetric deterrence", stating in a 2021 speech: "Threats must be neutralized at their origin."

== Death ==
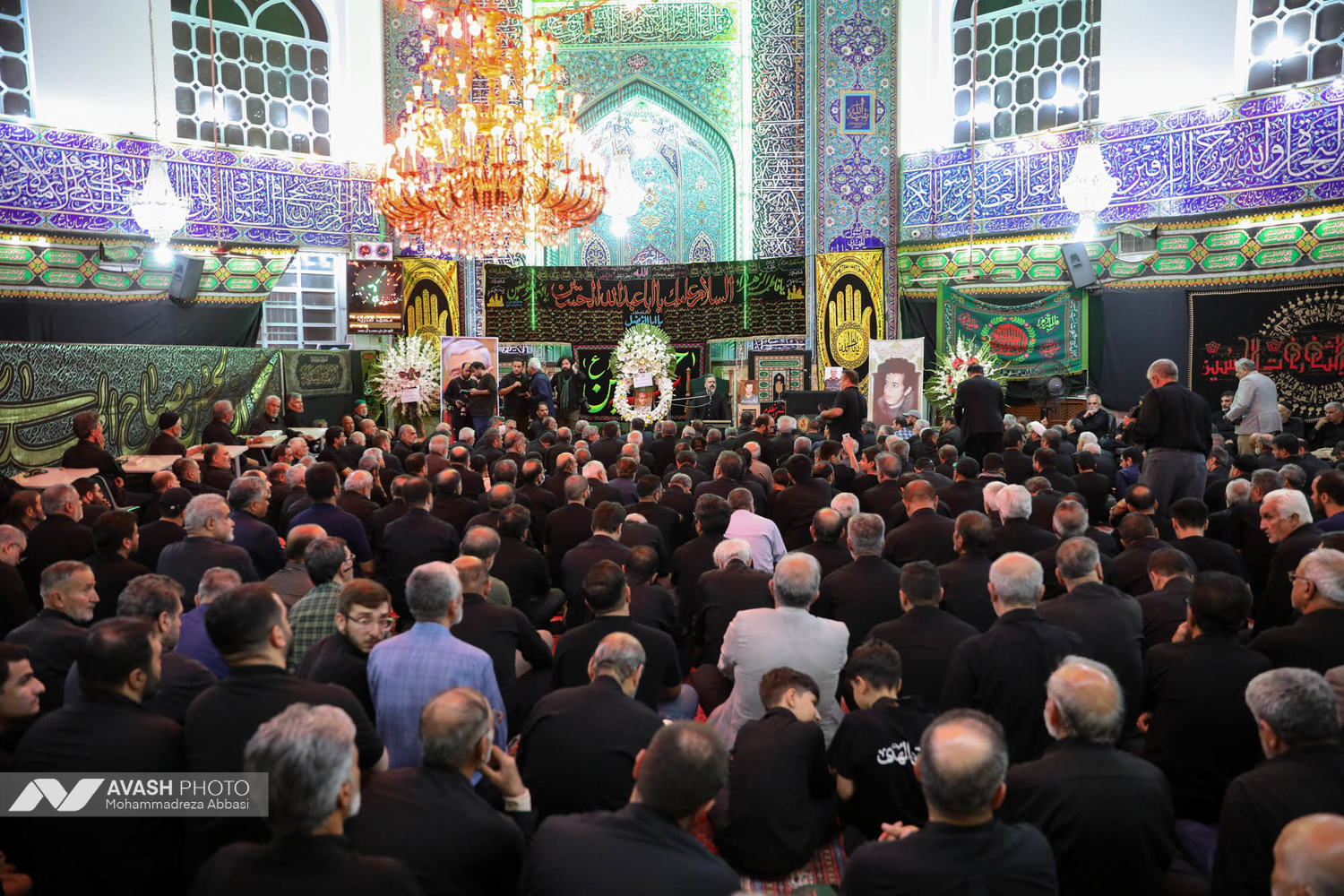
Commemoration ceremony for Lieutenant General Mohammad Bagheri, Tuesday, July 08, 2025, Sadrieh Mosque, Tehran.

Bagheri was killed by the June 2025 Israeli strikes on Iran, reported both Iranian state media and the Israeli military; he was succeeded by Abdolrahim Mousavi. His funeral held on 28 June was set to take place along with those of all the top commanders killed during the Twelve-Day War.

Bagheri was targeted at his home during Israeli airstrikes on Iran in the early hours of Friday (Day off of the week in Iran), June 13, 2025, and was killed along with his wife, Ashraf Bagheri, and his daughter, Fereshteh Bagheri.

The body of Mohammad Bagheri (Afshordi) was buried in "Plot 24" of the "Behesht-e Zahra Martyrs' Garden" in Tehran, alongside the bodies of his wife, Ashraf Bagheri (Afshordi), and his daughter, Fereshteh Bagheri (Afshordi).

=== Commemoration ceremony ===
A commemoration ceremony for Mohammad Bagheri was held on Tuesday, July 8, 2025, at the Sadrieh Mosque in Tehran. The event was attended by commanders, military and civil officials, as well as the people of Tehran.

=== Fortieth day ceremony ===
The ceremony commemorating the 40th day since the dying of Lieutenant General Mohammad Bagheri, along with his wife, Ashraf Bagheri, and his daughter, Fereshteh Bagheri, was held on Thursday evening, July 24, 2025, with the presence of the Speaker of the Parliament of Iran and the Chief of Staff of the General Staff of the Armed Forces of the Islamic Republic of Iran.

The ceremony was attended by Mohammad Bagher Ghalibaf, the Speaker of the Islamic Consultative Assembly; Major General Abdolrahim Mousavi, Chief of Staff of the General Staff of the Armed Forces of the Islamic Republic of Iran; Major General Amir Hatami, Commander-in-Chief of the Islamic Republic of Iran Army; Esmail Qaani, Commander of the Quds Force of the Islamic Revolutionary Guard Corps; Hossein Simaee Sarraf, Minister of Science, Research, and Technology; Major General Mohammad Pakpour, Commander-in-Chief of the Islamic Revolutionary Guard Corps (IRGC); Brigadier General Hamid Vahedi, Commander of the Islamic Republic of Iran Air Force; Abdullah Haji Sadeghi, Representative of the Supreme Leader of Iran in the Islamic Revolutionary Guard Corps (IRGC); Abdolali Govahi, Head of Political Ideology of the General Staff of the Armed Forces of the Islamic Republic of Iran; Fathollah Jafari, Head of the Foundation for the Preservation of Hassan Bagheri's Works; Abolghasem Foroutan, Head of the Office of the Chief of Staff of the General Staff of the Armed Forces of the Islamic Republic of Iran; and Hossein Rahimi, Head of the Economic Security Police of Iran, at the "Hazrat-e Amir Mosque" located in the "Amirabad" area of Tehran.

== See also ==
- List of Iranian two-star generals since 1979
- Targeted killing by Israel
- Assassinations of Iranian nuclear scientists

== Notes ==
Military offices
Preceded by Hassan Firouzabadi	Chief-of-Staff of the Iranian Armed Forces; 28 June 2016–13 June 2025	Succeeded by Abdolrahim Mousavi
Preceded by Vacant	Deputy for Joint Affairs and Structures of the General Staff; 2014–28 June 2016	Succeeded by Vacant
Preceded by Behrouz Soleiman-jah	Deputy for Intelligence and Operations of the General Staff; 2002–2014	Succeeded by Vacant
Preceded by ?	Deputy Coordinator of the Khatam al-Anbiya Central Headquarters; 2007–2016	Succeeded by Ali Shadmani
Preceded by Office Established	Deputy for Intelligence and Operations of the IRGC Ground Forces; 1985–1989	Succeeded by Gholamreza Mehrabi
