= General Staff of the Islamic Republic of Iran Armed Forces =

Highest ranked officer of the Iranian Armed Forces

- ستاد کل نیروهای مسلح جمهوری اسلامی ایران (Persian)
- Seal of the General Staff of Iranian Armed Forces
- Founded: 2 June 1988
- Country: Iran
- Type: General staff
- Part of: Iranian Armed Forces
- Garrison/HQ: Khatam al-Anbiya Central Headquarters, Tehran, Iran

Commanders
- Chief of the General Staff: Ali Abdollahi
- Deputy Chief of the General Staff: Kioumars Heydari

Insignia
- Flag of the General Staff

The General Staff of the Islamic Republic of Iran Armed Forces (Note: (Persian: ستاد کل نیروهای مسلح جمهوری اسلامی ایران, romanized: Setad-e Kol-e Niruha-ye Mosallah-e Jomhuri-ye Islami-ye Iran)) is the most senior military body of Iranian Armed Forces. Its responsibility is to implement policy, monitor and coordinate activities between the Islamic Republic of Iran Army and the Islamic Revolutionary Guard Corps.

== Function ==
Iran's two separate military forces, the Islamic Republic of Iran Army (Artesh) and the Islamic Revolutionary Guard Corps (IRGC) are subordinate to the General Staff, as well as Iran's national police force, the Police Command.

The general staff was set up in 1989 to enhance cooperation and counterbalance the rivalry between the armed forces and is directly decreed by Supreme Leader of Iran, while the Ministry of Defence and Armed Forces Logistics, responsible for planning, logistics and funding of the armed forces is part of the executive branch under the President of Iran.

== Passive Defence and Cyberwarfare ==
The National Organization for Passive Defense also reports to the Armed Forces General Staff.

It has been reported that Iran is one of the five countries that has a cyber-army capable of conducting cyber-warfare operations. It has also been reported that Iran has immensely increased its cyberwarfare capability since the post presidential election un-rest. In 2010, China accused the United States of having initiated a cyber war against Iran through websites such as Twitter and YouTube in addition to employing a hacker brigade for the purpose of fomenting unrest in Iran.

In early 2010, two new garrisons for cyberwarfare were established at Zanjan and Isfahan. As of 2024, Iran's cyber activities have become more sophisticated, engaging in a persistent cyber struggle with Israel that focuses on espionage, information warfare, and attempts to target critical infrastructure, although Israel maintains a technological edge.

== List of chiefs ==
No.	Portrait	Chief	Took office	Left office	Time in office	Defence branch	Ref.
Chief of the Headquarters of the General Command of Forces
–	Akbar Hashemi Rafsanjani	Akbar Hashemi Rafsanjani (1934–2017); Acting	2 June 1988	20 August 1988	79 days	none	–
–	Mir-Hossein Mousavi	Mir-Hossein Mousavi (born 1942); Acting	20 August 1988	26 September 1989	1 year, 37 days	none	–
Chief of the General Staff of the Armed Forces
1	Hassan Firouzabadi	Major general Hassan Firouzabadi (1951–2021)	26 September 1989	28 June 2016	26 years, 276 days	IRGC	
2	Mohammad Bagheri	Major general Mohammad Bagheri (c. 1960–2025)	28 June 2016	13 June 2025 X	8 years, 350 days	IRGC	
–	Habibollah Sayyari	Commodore; Habibollah Sayyari (born 1955); Acting	13 June 2025	13 June 2025	0 days	NEDAJA	
3	Abdolrahim Mousavi	Major general Abdolrahim Mousavi (1960–2026)	13 June 2025	28 February 2026 X	260 days	NEZAJA	
4	Ali Abdollahi	Major general Ali Abdollahi (born 1959)	10 August 2026	Incumbent	91 days	IRGC	

== List of deputy chiefs ==
No.	Portrait	Deputy Chief	Took office	Left office	Time in office	Defence branch	Chief	Ref.
1	Hassan Firouzabadi	Major general Hassan Firouzabadi (1951–2021)	2 June 1988	26 September 1989	1 year, 116 days	IRGC	Mir-Hossein Mousavi	–
2	Mohammad Forouzandeh	Brigadier general Mohammad Forouzandeh (born 1960)	30 September 1989	11 September 1993	3 years, 346 days	IRGC	Hassan Firouzabadi	–
3	Ali Sayad Shirazi	Lieutenant general Ali Sayad Shirazi (1944–1999)	11 September 1993	10 April 1999 X	5 years, 211 days	NEZAJA	Hassan Firouzabadi	–
4	Gholam Ali Rashid	Major general Gholam Ali Rashid (1953–2025)	10 April 1999	5 July 2016	17 years, 86 days	IRGC	Hassan Firouzabadi	–
5	Abdolrahim Mousavi	Major general Abdolrahim Mousavi (1960–2026)	5 July 2016	21 August 2017	1 year, 47 days	NEZAJA	Mohammad Bagheri	
6	Ataollah Salehi	Major general Ataollah Salehi (born 1950)	21 August 2017	2 July 2019	1 year, 315 days	NEZAJA	Mohammad Bagheri	
7	Mohammad-Reza Gharaei Ashtiani	Brigadier general Mohammad-Reza Gharaei Ashtiani (born c. 1960)	2 July 2019	19 September 2021	2 years, 79 days	NEZAJA	Mohammad Bagheri	
8	Aziz Nasirzadeh	Brigadier general Aziz Nasirzadeh (1965–2026)	19 September 2021	21 August 2024	2 years, 337 days	NAHAJA	Mohammad Bagheri	
(7)	Mohammad-Reza Gharaei Ashtiani	Brigadier general Mohammad-Reza Gharaei Ashtiani (born c. 1960)	21 August 2024	10 August 2026	1 year, 354 days	NEZAJA	Mohammad Bagheri; Abdolrahim Mousavi	
9	Kioumars Heydari	Brigadier general Kioumars Heydari (born 1964)	10 August 2026	Incumbent	91 days	NEZAJA	Ali Abdollahi	

== See also ==
- Islamic Revolutionary Guard Corps Joint Staff
- Joint Staff of the Islamic Republic of Iran Army
