= Imam Ali Officers' Academy =

Iranian Army training university

Coordinates: 35.6857°N 51.3987°E

Imam Ali Officers' University
- دانشگاه افسری امام علی
- Seal of the University
- Former name: Officers' School
- Motto: Persian: ایمان، انضباط، آموزش
- Motto in English: Faith, Discipline, Education
- Type: Military academy
- Established: December 5, 1921
- Founder: Reza Shah Pahlavi
- Affiliations: Islamic Republic of Iran Ground Forces
- Commandant: 2nd Brigadier General Isa Bayat
- Location: Tehran, Iran
- Campus: Urban
- Colours: Khaki, Cream and Brown
- Website: imamaliuniv.aja.ir

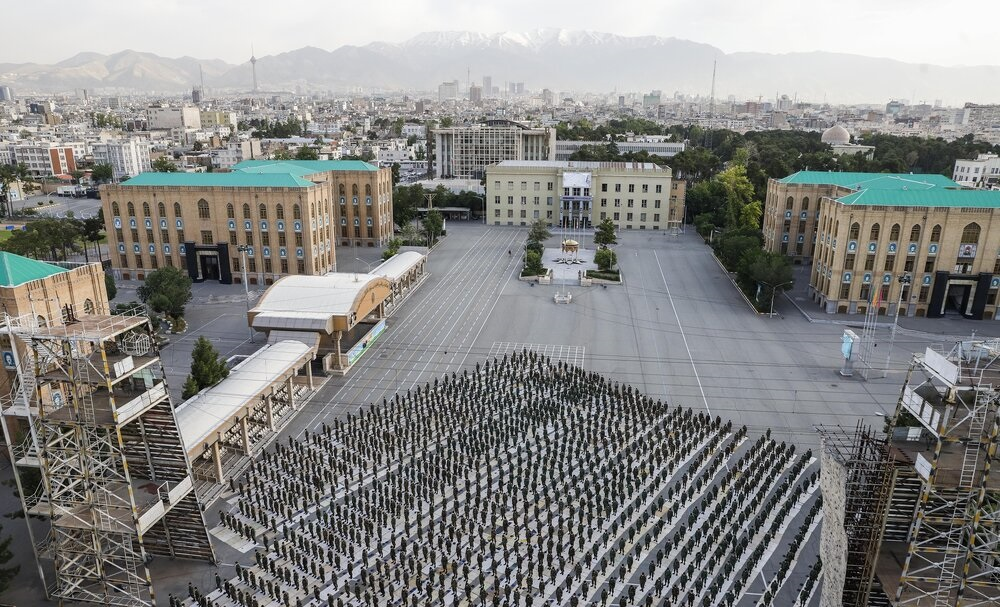
View of the academy

Imam Ali Officers' University (Persian: دانشگاه افسری امام علی; acronym: دا اف, DĀʿAF), formerly known as Officers' School (Persian: دانشکده افسری) is the military academy of the Islamic Republic of Iran Ground Forces, located in Tehran, Iran. Cadets of the academy achieve the second lieutenant rank upon graduation and join the Ground Forces.

== Directors ==
- Sadegh Mahmoudi (?–1979)
- Mousa Namjoo (1979–?)
- Ali Sayad Shirazi (? – 1981)
- Hossein Hatami (1998–1991)
- Ataollah Salehi (1998–2001)
- Abdolrahim Mousavi (2001–2005)
- Ahmad Reza Pourdastan (2005–2006)
- Fathollah Rashidzadeh (2006–2012)
- Ali Ojaghi
- Morteza Zarifi
- Ali Mahdavi (2024– ?)
- Isa Bayat (? –present)
