= Amir (Iranian Army) =

Honorific title ranking 2nd Brigadier General and higher

Gorget patches for Amirs

Gorget patches for Timsars

Amir (Persian: امير), previously known as Timsar (تيمسار), is the honorific title used for officers of high rank, ranking 2nd Brigadier General and higher in the Islamic Republic of Iran Army. The title is also used to address the Police Command of the Islamic Republic of Iran commanders, except for those who previously have served in the Islamic Revolutionary Guard Corps, where Sardar is equivalent to the title. Amirs are often graduates of the University of Command and Staff (DAFOOS).

Ranks being addressed by the title in Ground Force, Air Force and Air Defense Base include:

Rank
Sartip 2
Sartip
Sarlashkar
Sepahbod
Arteshbod
Islamic Republic
Insignia (Amir)

Imperial Insignia (Timsar)
N/A

Ranks being addressed by the title in the Navy include:

Rank
Daryadar 2
Daryadar
Daryaban
Daryasalar
Daryabod
Islamic Republic
Insignia (Amir)

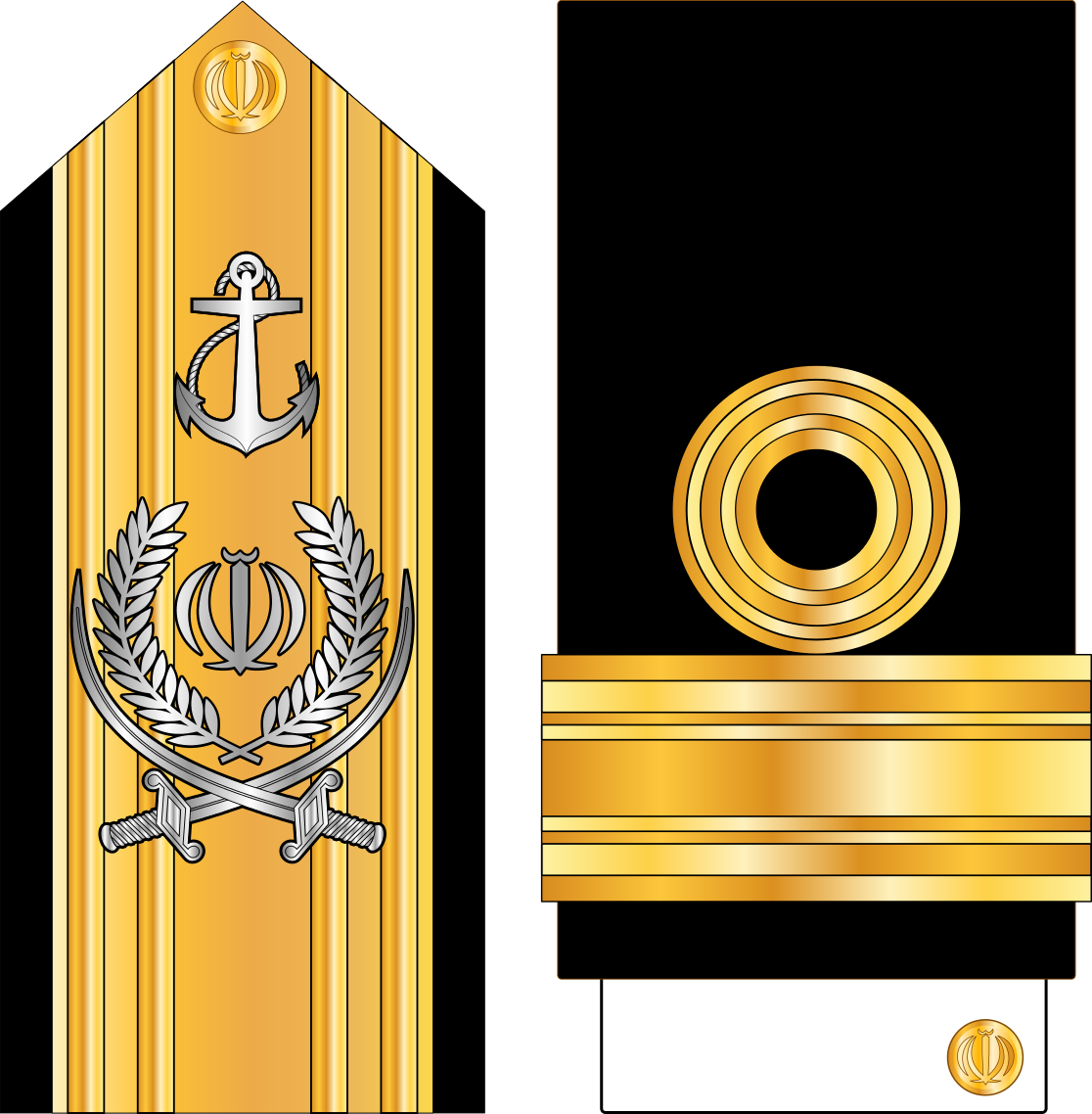

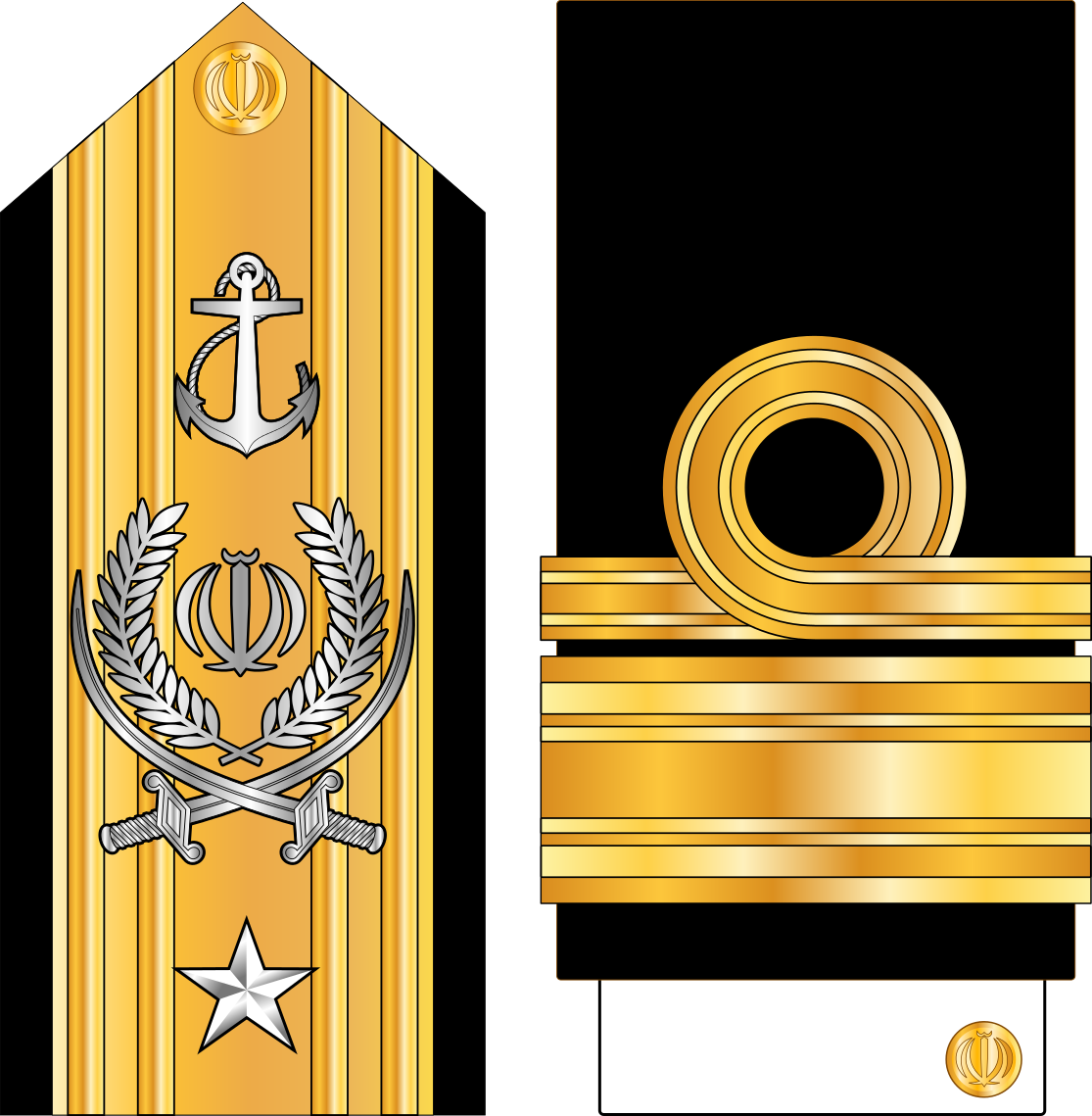

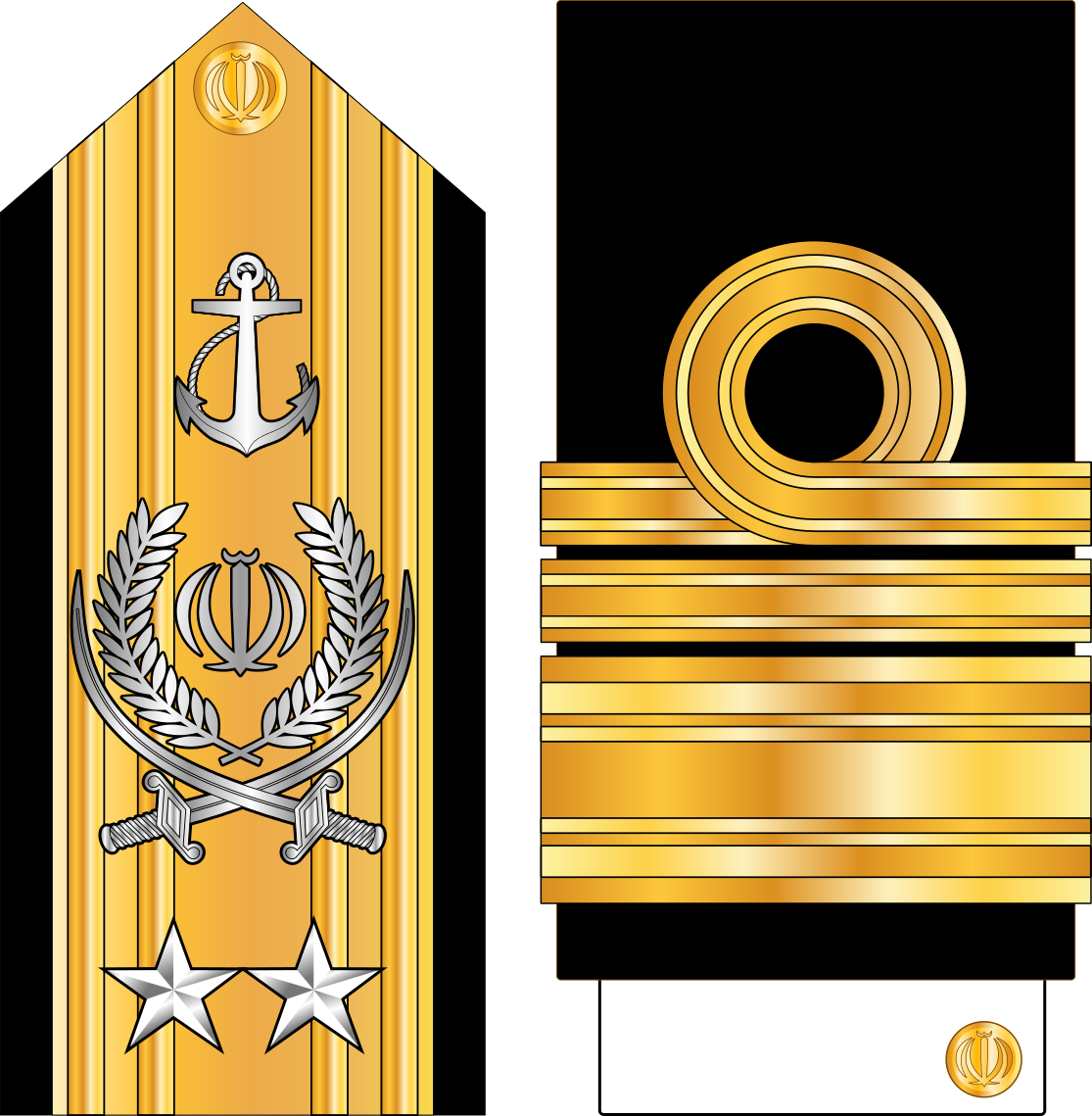

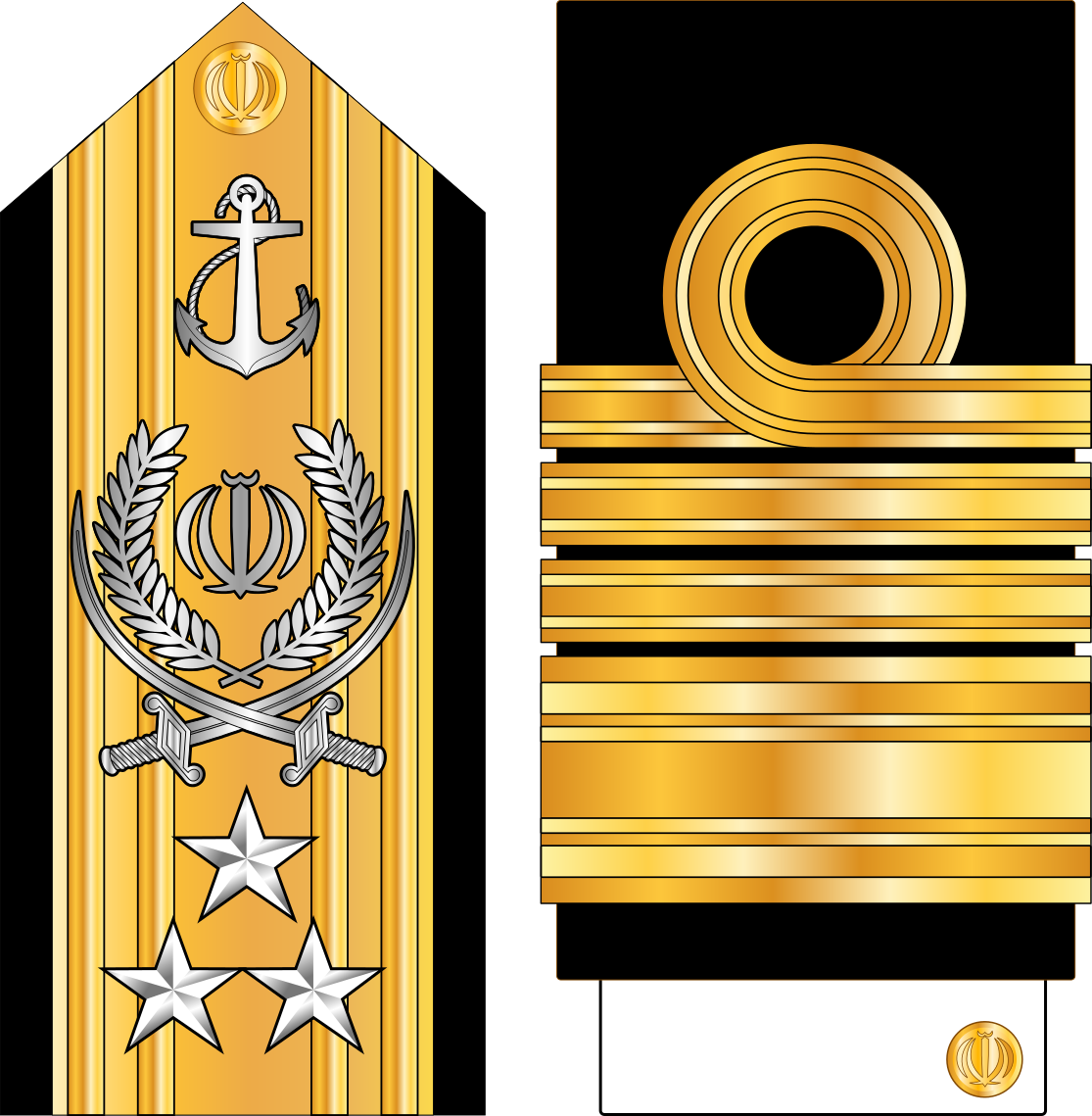

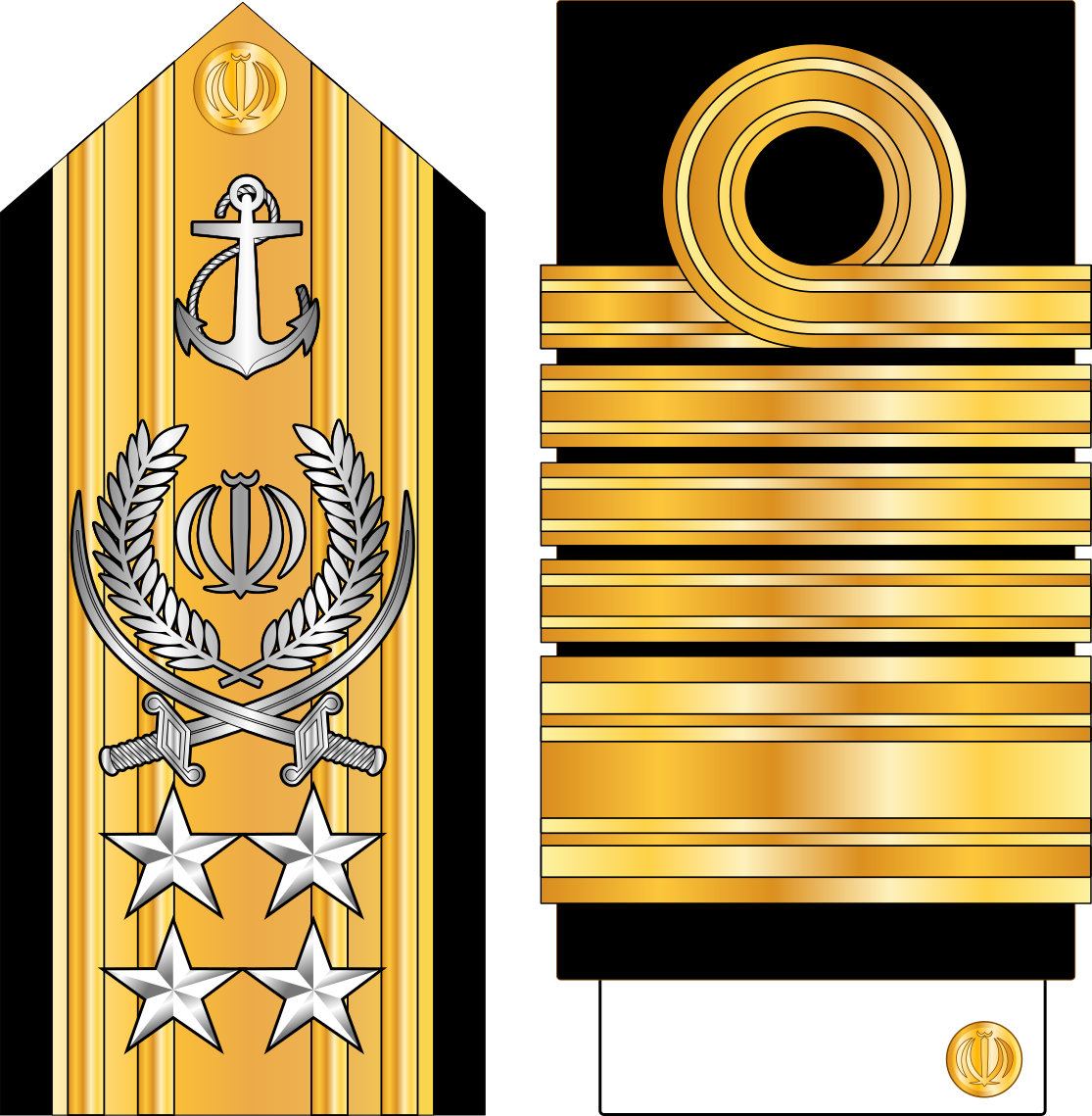

Imperial Insignia (Timsar)
N/A

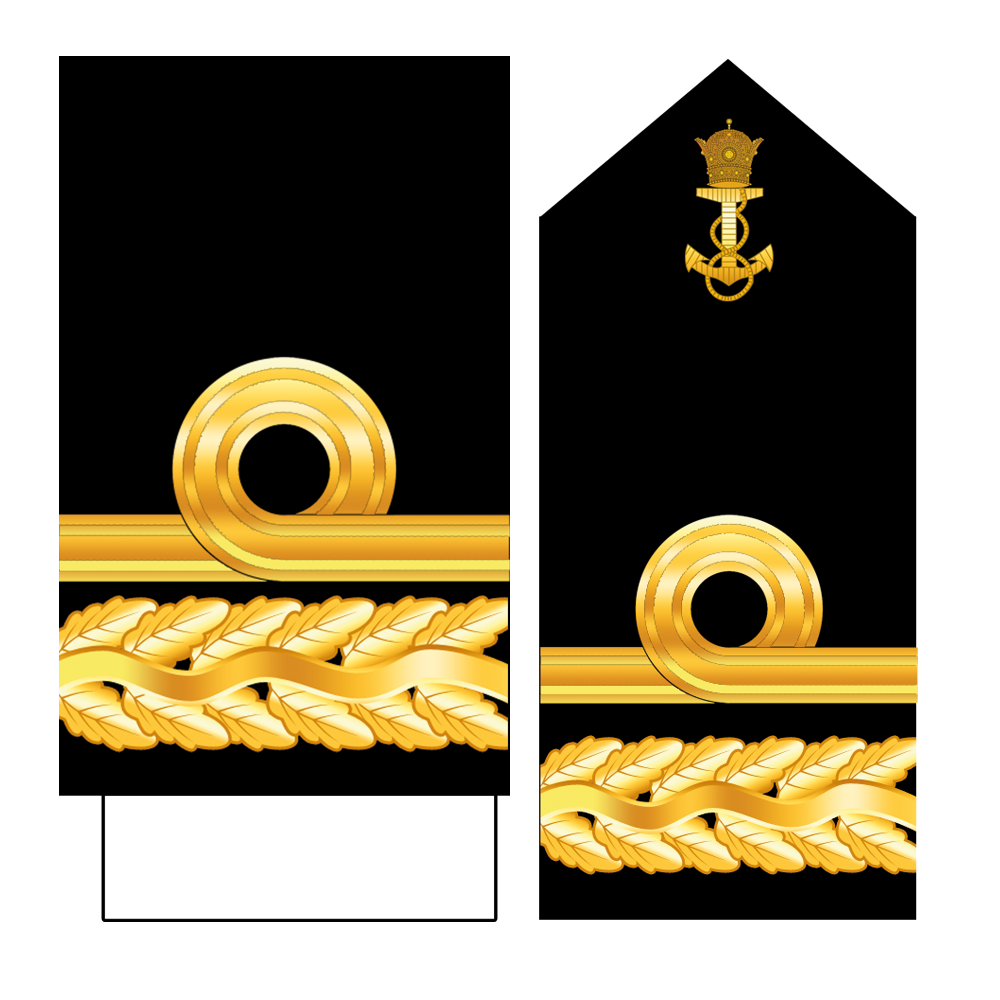

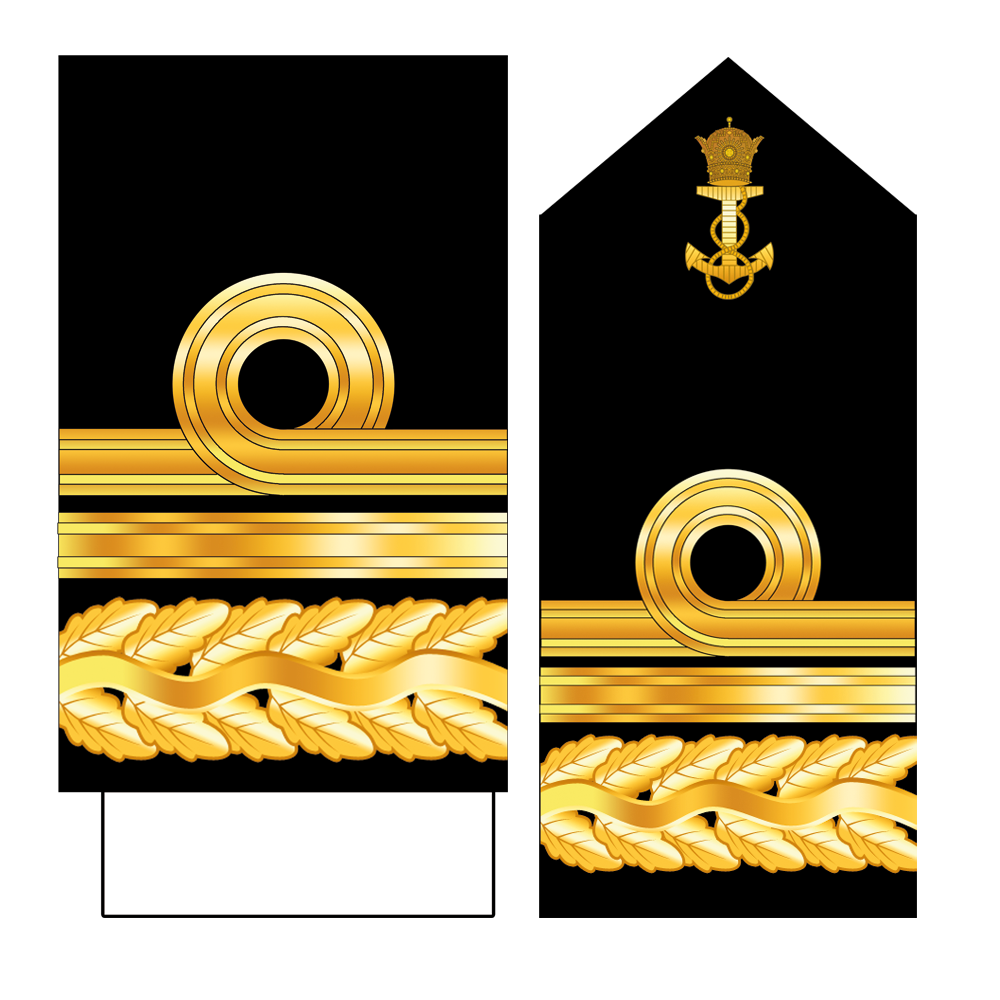

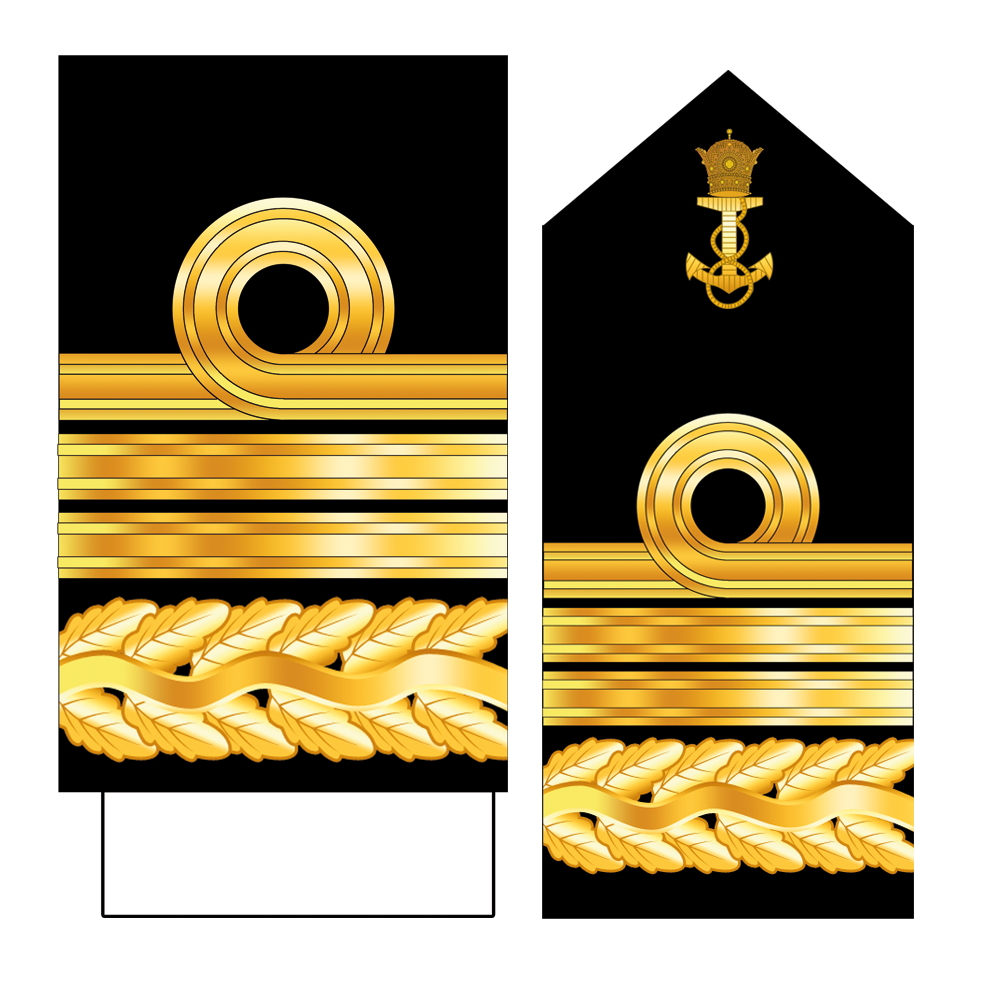

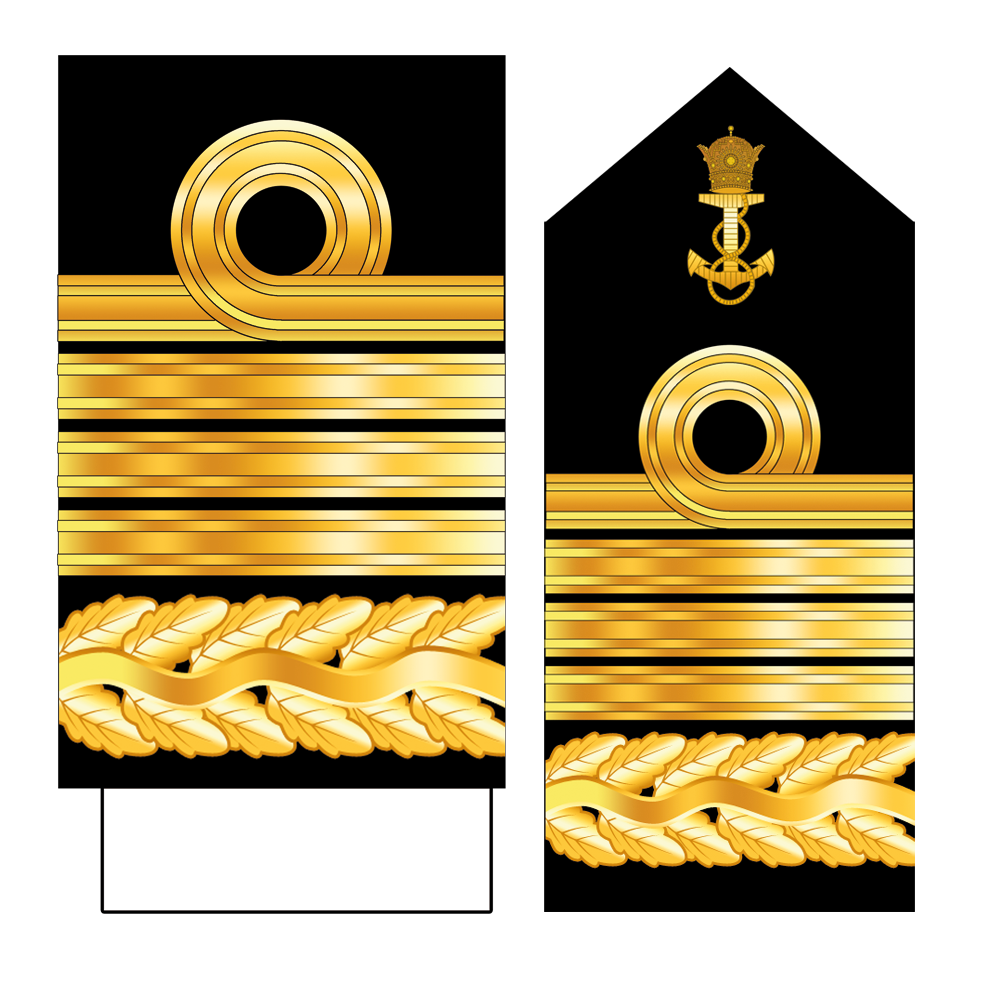

== See also ==
- Military ranks of Imperial Iran
- Military ranks of Iran
