= List of Simoun episodes =

This is the list of episodes for the Japanese anime television series Simoun. It was directed by Junji Nishimura and consisted of 26 episodes which were broadcast in Japan from April 4 to September 26, 2006. Background music was composed by Toshihiko Sahashi with the OP Utsukushikereba Sore de Ii sung by Chiaki Ishikawa and the ED Inori no Uta sung by Savage Genius. The anime is science fiction, taking place in Daikūriku, and follows the pilots of the mysterious simoun. These pilots are unique as they can only fly if they have not yet chosen their gender, although they appear female. The storyline follows the war they are involved in against the other nations, the mystery behind the simoun, and the complex, often romantic relationships of the young pilots.

== Episode list ==
No.	Title	Original release date
1	"Fallen Wings"; Transliteration: "Ochita Tsubasa" (Japanese: 堕ちた翼)	April 4, 2006
Argentum sends a large fleet of airships to attack Simulacrum, in order to steal the helical motor technology found in the Simoun. Fifteen or more carrier airships participate in the attack, yielding a total force of hundreds of "dragonfly" fighters. The invasion fleet is intercepted by two Simoun choirs on routine patrol: Chor Caput (コール·カプト, Kōru Kaputo) and Chor Tempest. Simulacran doctrine holds that any potential enemy will flee in terror at the first sight of a Simoun, yet the Argentum air fleet manages to completely wipe out Chor Caput. Chor Tempest is able to destroy large number of enemy fighters with its own Ri Mājon power before being lured into an encounter with the entire Argentum fleet. They attempt to destroy the whole fleet with a powerful maneuver known as the Iron Ri Mājon (鉄のリ·マージョン, Tetsu no Ri Mājon), but the Argentum fighters are so numerous that they wind up erasing the Ri Mājon trails. One of the choir's Simoun is destroyed by enemy gunfire, and the remainder are left unable to execute a Ri Mājon effect sufficient to repel the enemy attack. In desperation, Neviril and her partner Amuria attempt an extremely powerful but extremely dangerous maneuver, the Emerald Ri Mājon (翠玉のリ·マージョン, Suigyoku no Ri Mājon), in a last-ditch attempt to salvage the situation. Neviril and Amuria appear to be on the verge of successfully completing the Emerald Ri Mājon when disaster strikes. Their Simoun has a head-on encounter with an Argentum dragonfly fighter. Neviril sees the enemy pilot inside his cockpit and meets his gaze, which forces her to see the attacking enemy forces as people rather than machines. She loses the will to kill them, and her resulting moment of hesitation causes the Ri Mājon to fail. The failure of the Emerald Ri Mājon causes an explosion similar to the detonation of a nuclear weapon. The remaining Simouns of Chor Tempest escape the blast, but the entire attacking fleet is annihilated, and Neviril's Simoun is crippled. The upper fuselage is a twisted wreck, and the sagitta cockpit is missing entirely and Amuria with it. Tragedy strikes Chor Tempest in its first battle against the air fleet of the Argentum Archipelago, and two mysterious new Sibyllae join the choir. Three Sibyllae from Chor Tempest were killed in the initial battle. After the battle, three more announce their intent to leave the ranks of the Sibyllae and go to the Spring to choose a permanent sex. The remaining Sibyllae are all too demoralized to act as an effective fighting force, especially Neviril, who cannot even bring herself to leave her stateroom on the Arcus Prima. The only bright spot for Chor Tempest at this time is the arrival of two promising new recruits: Sibylla Aer, an excellent pilot with unshakeable morale, and Sibylla Rimone, a child prodigy who was recently made the youngest Sibylla ever.
2	"The Blue Spring"; Transliteration: "Aoi Izumi" (Japanese: 青い泉)	April 11, 2006
Aer immediately decides to try to form a pair with Neviril, but Neviril is still grieving for Amuria. Neviril follows one of the three departing Sibyllae to the Spring out of friendship, and nearly enters it herself. Elly must choose whether to become male or female when she visits the Spring to choose her sex, and Aer tries to convince Neviril not to follow Elly into the Spring.
3	"Distant War"; Transliteration: "Tōi Sensō" (Japanese: 遠い戦争)	April 17, 2006
Aer tries to convince Neviril to rejoin Chor Tempest and pair with her, as Chor Tempest struggles with its morale after its recent losses.
4	"Nearby War"; Transliteration: "Chikai Sensō" (Japanese: 近い戦争)	April 25, 2006
Aer searches for a new pair in the face of Neviril's continuing refusal, and she and Rimone encounter the enemy up close.
5	"White Solitude"; Transliteration: "Shiroi Kodoku" (Japanese: 白い孤独)	May 2, 2006
Dominūra arrives to try to turn Chor Tempest around, starting with Rimone. Rimone has her first flight as an auriga and struggles with demons from her past.
6	"Wounds and Pain"; Transliteration: "Kizu to Itami" (Japanese: 傷と痛み)	May 9, 2006
As Neviril remains hikikomori, Paraietta wrestles with her feelings for Neviril, and with Kaim's feelings for her.
7	"Over International Waters"; Transliteration: "Kōkai Jōkū nite" (Japanese: 公海上空にて)	May 16, 2006
As the Arcus Prima heads for international waters to serve as the site of the peace conference between Plumbum and Simulacrum, Neviril's father Halconf interferes to try to jar his daughter out of her hikikomori phase. He orders two Sibyllae, Mamina and Yun, to join Chor Tempest to bring it to full strength, and on the strength of Mamina's service record, assigns her to be Neviril's new roommate and pair. Neviril, who is beginning to show signs of warming to Aer, rejects Mamina, and in reaction, Mamina attacks Aer. This shocking breach of conduct leads to the announcement that Chor Tempest will disband after the conclusion of the peace conference.
8	"Prayer"; Transliteration: "Inori" (Japanese: 祈り)	May 23, 2006
Relieved of its duties, Chor Tempest is assigned to play host to one of Plumbum's priestesses during the peace conference. The foreign priestess, Anglas, gets along well with the girls of the Simoun choir, but turns out to be a suicide bomber. She destroys two thirds of the Arcus Prima's Simoun wing and cripples the carrier itself. The bombing jars Neviril out of her funk. She agrees to pair with Aer, and leads Chor Tempest to save the Arcus Prima from certain destruction at the hands of a Plumbish battleship.
9	"The Hearing"; Transliteration: "Shinmon" (Japanese: 審問)	May 30, 2006
Now safe, Arcus Prima is brought into drydock at the Grand Temple. Neviril and Guragief travel to the chambers of the High Council of Simulacrum to try to defend Chor Tempest against Halconf's attempt to disband it. Neviril makes an impassioned speech before the council that offends many council members in its reference to the conflict as a "war", and in Neviril's refusal to blindly follow "the will of God" as Anglas did. Onasia, however, intervenes on Neviril's behalf, as does Sibylla Vura from the rival Chor Rubor. Vura and Neviril return from the Council chambers just as the remaining members of Chor Tempest are performing a funeral Ri Mājon in memory of the victims of the suicide bombing and right as Argentum launches a cruise missile attack against the Grand Temple. Chor Tempest easily destroys the missiles with the Iron Ri Mājon, and celebrates the news that the choir is not to be disbanded after all.
10	"Birds in a Cage"; Transliteration: "Kago no Tori" (Japanese: 籠の鳥)	June 6, 2006
That evening, Chor Tempest learns that Sibylla Dominūra has found the choir a new ship to fly from while Arcus Prima is in drydock. Dominūra, it turns out, had secretly attended the hearing as well, and had met with a secret faction of officials opposed to Halconf's administration. Dominūra's faction was able to bring the old converted freight airship Messis out of retirement and refit her in the fashion of a World War II escort carrier. Conditions aboard the Messis are considerably more spartan than on the converted luxury liner Arcus Prima, much to the displeasure of the Sibyllae.
11	"United Front"; Transliteration: "Kyōdō Sensen" (Japanese: 共同戦線)	June 13, 2006
Chor Tempest joins with an infantry unit to carry out an airmobile assault, and finds itself on the front lines of the ground war.
12	"Sisters"; Transliteration: "Ane to Imōto" (Japanese: 姉と妹)	June 20, 2006
Alty and Kaim are forced to try to fly together, but the shadow of the past haunts the two of them.
13	"Reason"; Transliteration: "Kotowari" (Japanese: 理(ことわり))	June 27, 2006
Aer upsets Neviril when she asks to try the Emerald Ri Mājon with her.
14	"Sacrosanct"; Transliteration: "Okasazaru Mono" (Japanese: 冒さざるもの)	July 4, 2006
Messis' active prosecution of the war is not matched by those in charge back at headquarters, however. Despite the discovery of a new class of heavy fighter based aboard the base ship and the possibility of an alliance between Plumbum and Argentum, Messis and Chor Tempest receive orders to passively monitor the base ship's activities rather than attacking. Dominūra takes matters into her own hands, ordering Aer and Neviril to sortie to intercept the base and conduct an armed reconnaissance of it. She also orders Wapōrif to dismantle one of the hitherto sacrosanct Simoun to learn the secret of how they work. Wapōrif is shocked at this violation of one of Simulacrum's strongest taboos, but eventually accedes. His faith is shaken when he sees nothing obviously magical or divine inside the Simoun's helical motors; they appear to be mere machines to him. Dominūra, however, is able to see something inside that Wapōrif (who, being male, has already gone to the Spring) cannot — something profoundly shocking. She has to be helped away, screaming, from the flight deck.
15	"One, and Then Another"; Transliteration: "Hitori, Mata Hitori" (Japanese: 一人, また一人)	July 9, 2006
Chor Tempest sorties one by one to search for a shadowy enemy, as the consequences of recent events hit home emotionally for many of its members. The enemy, meanwhile, is far from idle. A series of feints by enemy fighters manages to draw out four of Chor Tempest's six Simoun from the Messis in a futile attempt at a decisive engagement. Rimone manages to rouse Dominūra from her shock, but with only those two and Aer and Paraietta left to defend Messis, the enemy springs their trap.
16	"The Emerald Ri Mājon"; Transliteration: "Suigyoku no Ri Mājon" (Japanese: 翠玉のリ·マージョン)	July 18, 2006
A large force of the new heavy fighters launches an alpha strike against the Messis during a thunderstorm. Only a quick decision by Wauf, its captain, to hide the ship, and the two remaining Simoun, on the ground in a forest behind a cliff from the enemy's approach vector, saves the ship from destruction. When the weather clears, the enemy reappears to resume their attack, and the two Simoun are compelled to intercept them to prevent them from discovering the Messis. Although both Simouns manage to destroy a portion of the attacking force, the enemy has adopted new tactics that disperse their aircraft to make them less vulnerable to the Ri Mājon effect. The two Simouns destroy a portion of the enemy fighter wave, but are pursued so closely by the surviving fighters that they are unable to complete further Ri Mājons. Wauf orders the Messis to exit its position of concealment, thereby drawing the enemy fighter attack onto his own ship to buy the Sibyllae some time. In a desperate response, Rimone and Dominūra perform the Emerald Ri Mājon and succeed. Their Simoun vanishes without a trace in a flash of light as the rest of the choir—including the four missing Simouns, who happen to appear just in time to see it—look on in horror. Unlike in the first battle, however, the Emerald Ri Mājon has no effect on the attacking aircraft or the outcome of the battle, but the day is saved when Arcus Prima, now fully repaired and operational, conveniently appears to drive away the remaining attackers.
17	"The Ruins"; Transliteration: "Iseki" (Japanese: 遺跡)	July 25, 2006
Back aboard the Arcus Prima, three government representatives (including Halconf) meet with the remaining members of the choir to discuss their next objective: to secure Simulacrum's holiest site, the Ruins, before the allied forces can steal Simoun-grade helical motors from it. They arrive to find three unidentified Simouns, of a different design to the Simoun that the Simulacran choirs use, exiting from the Ruins' main entrance. In the ensuing air battle, Chor Tempest manage to shoot down one of the stolen aircraft, but the other two escape unharmed. During the battle, Aer and Neviril discover that Aer's music box, though closed and deactivated, plays its song around the entrance to the Ruins. Instead of joining the dogfight, they land to investigate... and discover the Spring inside, and Onasia. After the fight, the remaining members of the choir land, and discover another of the ancient Simoun inside the Ruins. Inside it, they find Anglas' dead body sitting in the auriga seat.
18	"The Funeral"; Transliteration: "Sōretsu" (Japanese: 葬列)	August 1, 2006
After the funeral, Aer and Neviril discuss what they saw at the Ruins. Aer reveals that her grandfather told her stories about a "door to another world" that the Simoun could open. She speculates that Anglas may have traveled to the ancient Simoun through that other world during the explosion. They compare this to Onasia's statements that she is "everywhere and nowhere" and that the Spring exists outside normal reality, and conclude that what's true for Anglas and Onasia may also be true for Dominūra and Rimone — who therefore could be alive somewhere. Neviril swears Aer to secrecy about their discussion, and the two agree to keep it a secret. Realizing that the Simouns seen at the Ruins were most likely piloted by Plumbish priestesses, the Simulacran Defence Minister orders Chor Tempest to locate and destroy the airborne supply base that Messis had discovered, using the Messis as their base. Aer and Yun are ordered to stay behind, with Mamina taking Aer's place as Neviril's pair. They ignore their orders and follow along in Chor Tempest's wake anyway. Neviril splits her patrol in half, taking Alty and Floe with her, and assigning a different sector to the other two Simouns.
19	"Sibylla"; Transliteration: "Shivyura" (Japanese: シヴュラ)	August 8, 2006
When Neviril's flight locates the allied base ship, the two ancient Simouns that had escaped the dogfight at the ruins sortie to meet them, along with a large number of Argentum heavy fighters. The two Simulacran Simouns destroy a number of opposing fighters, but the weight of numbers is too great, especially when combined with the presence of hostile Simouns. Completely defensive and unable to break out of evasive maneuvers long enough to execute a Ri Mājon, Neviril orders Alty and Floe to break off and summon reinforcements. She and Mamina barely evade a Ri Mājon attack by the enemy Simouns, but are promptly hit by gunfire from an Argentum fighter, and crash on the flight deck of the base ship. Neviril is incapacitated in the crash. The two ancient Simouns land next to Mamina and Neviril's crippled craft, and the four Plumbish priestesses who were piloting them emerge, wielding pistols. They explain that they hold the Simoun Sibyllae in great reverence, and regret having to fight them. They try to help Neviril and Mamina escape. Instead, Mamina sacrifices herself to save the foreign priestesses, who would have been executed as traitors for helping them escape. The rest of Chor Tempest arrives with the Messis and scatters the allied troops on the base ship's flight deck, but it is too late—Mamina had been shot through the heart by one of the priestesses to avoid the dishonor of being killed by the Argentum soldiers. Roatreamon is disconsolate, and Aer is in shock.
20	"Lament"; Transliteration: "Nageki no Uta" (Japanese: 嘆きの詩)	August 15, 2006
After the death of another of their members, the remaining Sibyllae of Chor Tempest must somehow find the strength to keep fighting, but they have started to lose hope, and the war is not looking so good. Aer is especially emotional and falls to the ground crying in front of Neviril, who had been watching her make the emerald ri majon, and they have a moment. The danger and death surrounding their situation has become apparent, highlighted by Morinas being asked to go to the spring by Waporif out of concern for her well-being, and Floe later announcing she wants to go the spring, although this does not happen. Paraietta is feeling very guilty and Alti notices and they have a talk. Then it is discovered that Mamina's remains were sent back to her home without a funeral on Arcus Prima like Anglas got, which is not taken well. The Sibyllae are also not too thrilled at how quickly Mamina is replaced, although they have no issue with Vyura joining. As this is happening, Yun is given the braid of Mamina's by Onasia, who tells her that Mamina has accepted her death. Yun shows it to everyone and tells Roatreamon that it shows Mamina's feelings, and Roateamon holds it and falls down crying. To mourn and honor their fallen comrade, all of them get together and fly despite no orders in a state of emergency to do ri majon for Mamina. Roatreamon mutters A-e-ru, clutching the braid in her hand. The scene is cut to show Mamina's coffin getting shot down and her body falling onto a bed of flowers.
21	"The Door to a New World"; Transliteration: "Shin Tenchi e no Tobira" (Japanese: 新天地への扉)	August 22, 2006
Aer, Neviril, and (at her request) Yun are delegated to accompany Onasia and several other religious officials to the Ruins, aboard the Messis. At the Ruins, the sibyllae are told the secret of the Emerald Ri Mājon: it allows the Simoun to travel in time. Chor Dextra was formed for that purpose, and used the Ruins as its training ground. In a last-ditch effort to save the rapidly failing Simulacran war effort, the chief priestess of the Grand Temple orders Aer and Neviril to reactivate Chor Dextra and perform the Emerald Ri Mājon to prevent the war from occurring in the first place. With the secret of the Emerald Ri Mājon revealed, we are finally shown what happened to Rimone and Dominūra. They landed in the far past, in the aftermath of a destructive war and a long period of lean economic times. Humanity had forgotten the secrets of the Simoun and the ways of their faith. The ancient Simoun found at the Ruins sit idle by the edge of the town where the two land, reduced to mere playthings for children. As the two are summoned to explain themselves to the townspeople, Dominūra explains to Rimone what she saw in the helical motors that upset her so much: she saw herself landing in this very town, explaining to the townspeople about the Emerald Ri Mājon, and thereby causing the entire war and all of the ensuing suffering. She asks Rimone for advice, and Rimone explains that if there had not been Simouns, she never would have met Chor Tempest or Dominūra. This admission overcomes Dominūra's reservations, and history unfolds exactly as Dominūra and Limone remember it.
22	"Sortie"; Transliteration: "Shutsugeki" (Japanese: 出撃)	August 29, 2006
The departure of Aer, Neviril, and Yun to the Ruins leaves Chor Tempest dangerously understrength, even when reinforced by Vura, who joins the choir to replace Mamina. Before the Messis can return, a black Simoun from the Arcus Niger crash lands on Arcus Prima's flight deck, with the news that the Niger has been destroyed by the alliance. Hard on its heels are not two but five Plumbish Simouns. The rump Chor Tempest gamely sorties to intercept them, only to see the Plumbish choir promptly disengage rather than destroy the sibyllae and the Arcus Prima. Arcus Prima returns to the Grand Temple in company with the Messis. Shortly after they arrive, the alliance launches an all-out attack on the Grand Temple itself. Chor Tempest sorties to intercept the assault. They manage to destroy several waves of incoming cruise missiles. Without the ability to do the Iron Ri Mājon, however, they are unable to intercept them all, and the surviving missiles detonate throughout the temple and surrounding city. Once again, the Plumbish Simouns refuse to engage in direct combat against the Sibyllae. Despite Chor Tempest's partial success, the Simulacran authorities realize that the war is lost, and sue for peace. The allied peace terms include Plumbish and Argentum occupation troops aboard the Arcus Prima and the disbandment of Chor Tempest. Halconf is forced to resign his office as a result of the defeat.
23	"Eternal Maidens"; Transliteration: "Eien no Shōjo" (Japanese: 永遠の少女)	September 5, 2006
The Grand Temple's chief priestess pulls Neviril aside to urge her to take either Aer or Paraietta and perform the Emerald Ri Mājon to undo the war, and is promptly arrested by Argentum troops. Simulacrum and its opponents come to a peace treaty. The condition: Chor Tempest must be permanently disbanded. Meanwhile, Yun investigates the mystery of the Spring and Onasia. While the final peace agreement is being imposed, Yun takes a Simile and flies off to the Spring to talk to Onasia. Onasia confesses to having been a member of Chor Dextra, and to having committed some "sin" because she tried to avoid making her gender choice. Specifically, she has never chosen a sex, in an attempt to remain an "eternal maiden", just like the Simoun. She removes one of her gloves to reveal glowing bluish skin beneath, which sheds a trail of gold sparkles similar to a Simoun's Ri Mājon trail. Being the keeper of the Spring, Onasia explains, is her punishment, and she has not been able to touch or hold anyone since.
24	"Choice"; Transliteration: "Sentaku" (Japanese: 選択)	September 12, 2006
Yun, after briefly flying back to the Arcus Prima to discuss the matter with Roatreamon, takes pity on Onasia. She returns to the Spring to embrace Onasia and offers her forgiveness. This breaks the spell, and Onasia dissolves in a shower of golden sparks. Yun takes up Onasia's office as the new keeper of the Spring. The members of Chor Tempest are ordered to go to the Spring to choose their permanent sex. Neviril tells Aer that she loves her. The remaining sibyllae of Chor Tempest are promptly packed off to the Spring at the insistence of the allied forces. Aer and Neviril ask for more time, and they confesses their feelings of each other. Their other seven choir-mates catch the next train to the Spring and are shocked to find Yun standing in Onasia's place.
25	"Pair"; Transliteration: "Paru" (Japanese: パル)	September 19, 2006
Hand in hand, the seven wade into the Spring to make their respective gender choices, supported emotionally by Yun. When the seven ex-Sibyllae return to the Arcus Prima to say their goodbyes, the allied occupation forces are alarmed to learn that two Simulacran sibyllae remain who have not gone to the Spring. Aer and Neviril are promptly arrested and thrown in the ship's brig, to be taken to the Spring under close guard. Their former choirmates unsuccessfully try to break them out. Anubituf and Guragief have better luck. They conspire with the Plumbish priestesses who have relieved Chor Tempest of their duties, and manage to gather everyone by the Māju pool to say their farewells to Neviril and Aer as they go to the Spring. All at once, the Plumbish priestesses overpower the allied guards, and two more fly a Simoun up through the Māju pool to turn over to Aer and Neviril for their journey to "another world." The pair say their farewells and fly off into the sunset.
26	"Their Portrait"; Transliteration: "Kanojo-tachi no Shōzō" (Japanese: 彼女達の肖像)	September 26, 2006
The Plumbish authorities send a choir of Simouns to intercept Aer and Neviril, but instead of attacking, they perform the Ri Mājon of the Morning Calm in a friendly gesture of farewell. Aer and Neviril perform the Emerald Ri Mājon, and a peaceful white light appears at its center in place of the howling vortex from the other attempts. The two vanish in a flash of light. Years after the war, the former members of Chor Tempest reflect on their lives. Scene ends with Neviril and Aer in an alternate world dancing on an abandoned Arcus Primus. Back in the past, a pair of new Simoun Sibyllae that Rimone has trained are finally ready to attempt the Emerald Ri Mājon. Dominūra is bedridden with some sort of illness, much to Rimone's dismay. The success of the Emerald Ri Mājon by Rimone's protégées reawakens a desire in Rimone to fly again. When another of the new Sibyllae pulls her aside to ask her to pair with her, Rimone turns her down. Dominūra is Rimone's pair, she explains, and she will have no other. At that moment, a Simulacran-style Simoun appears in the sky via the Emerald Ri Mājon and vanishes. "Aer!" exclaims Rimone. "Is that someone's name?" asks the Sibylla that Rimone turned down. "It's... the ultimate form of love," replies Rimone. "Yes, the ultimate love," says Dominūra, up from her bed and fully dressed. "To what sky shall we fly next?" she asks. Dominūra and Rimone embrace, and walk happily off to their Simoun to attempt the Emerald Ri Mājon again. As they walk off, the disappointed Sibylla notices sparkly gold flakes in Dominūra's wake. Yun calls out Dominūra's name as she peers into the Spring, years later. Years pass. Plumbum and Argentum have a falling out, and a cold war develops between them. Paraietta manages an orphanage, funded by Roatreamon's family business. Alty and Kaim reconcile, and move back in with their parents. Guragief and Anubituf stay together. Morinas and Wapōrif marry and have several children. Wauf remains as the captain of the Messis, which reverts to being a freighter again in peacetime. Eliph and Morinas join the Messis' crew, and as they load cargo one day, Morinas briefly catches sight of Aer and Neviril's Simoun as it fades in and out of reality. Vuraf and Floef are drafted by opposite sides for the coming war, and Vuraf comes to visit Floef on his farm by the shore of the lake where the wreck of the Arcus Prima has settled. The two part with a wish that they never meet on the battlefield, and as the sun sets, Floef catches sight of an ancient V-tailed Simoun as it appears in the sky. In the red glow of the sunset, a record player starts up in the deserted ballroom of the wrecked Arcus Prima. Neviril and Aer dance happily in each other's arms. As they dance, the ballroom is transformed back into its old self, until the pair vanish.

== Distribution ==
=== Japan ===
The anime has been released on DVD in Japan by Bandai Visual. The series consists of nine DVDs, with two episodes on the first volume and three on each of the others. They are encoded for Region 2 and do not have English subtitles. A 7-disc DVD box set was released in Japan on 28 January 2011. The box set includes all 26 episodes but none of the on-disc extras or liner notes from the original DVDs. Megami Magazine released a 30-minute promotional DVD for Simoun in September 2006. The offer was limited to the first 1000 readers to mail in a coupon from the magazine. The DVD includes cast commentary and interviews, a Tsukkomi segment similar to that on DVD volume 8, a "voice-over" for the first installment of the Megami manga, and other promotional material.

Volume	Episodes	Catalog number	JAN	Release date
1	1–2	BCBA-2506	4934569625069	2006-08-25
On-disc extras include release information, TV commercials for the anime, and Monthly! ADR Bulletin Special (月刊!アフレコ通信すぺしゃる, Gekkan! Afureko Tsūshin Supesharu), a light-hearted quiz show with the voice cast as competitors; Liner notes include character introductions for Neviril, Aer, Amuria and Elly; an interview with voice actors Rieko Takahashi (Neviril) and Michi Niino (Aer); background information on the anime's setting; and a gallery of "eyecatch" illustrations (the images shown before and after the commercial break) by character designer Asako Nishida; First-pressing bonus: two postcards with eyecatch illustrations (episode 1 eyecatch 2, episode 2 eyecatch 1)
2	3–5	BCBA-2507	4934569625076	2006-09-22
On-disc extras: early promotional video for the anime; Gekkan interview with Rieko Takahashi and Michi Niino; Liner notes: character introductions for Paraietta, Kaim and Vura; interview with voice actors Ami Koshimizu (Paraietta) and Michiko Hosogoshi (Kaim); First-pressing bonus: episode 4(1) and 5(1) eyecatch postcards
3	6–8	BCBA-2508	4934569625083	2006-10-27
On-disc extras: clean opening video (original version without Yun); Gekkan interview with Ami Koshimizu and Michiko Hosogoshi; Liner notes: character introductions for Rimone and Dominura; interview with voice actors Mamiko Noto (Rimone) and Yukana (Dominura); First-pressing bonus: episode 6(2) and 7(1) eyecatch postcards
4	9–11	BCBA-2509	4934569625090	2006-11-24
On-disc extra: Junji and Asako's "Know-Your-Simoun Lecture 1" (純二と亜沙子のよくわかる!シムーン講座1, Junji to Asako no Yoku Wakaru! Shimūn Kōza 1), a commentary by director Junji Nishimura (西村純二) and Asako Nishida; Liner notes: character introductions for Floe and Alty; interview with voice actors Michiru Aizawa (Floe) and Megumi Toyoguchi (Alty); First-pressing bonus: episode 10(2) and 11(1) eyecatch postcards
5	12–14	BCBA-2510	4934569625106	2006-12-22
On-disc extras: clean ending video; Gekkan interview with Mamiko Noto and Yukana; Liner notes: character introductions for Morinas and Wapōrif; interview with voice actors Nana Mizuki (Morinas) and Fumie Mizusawa (Wapōrif); First-pressing bonus: episode 13(2) and 14(1) eyecatch postcards
6	15–17	BCBA-2511	4934569625113	2007-01-26
On-disc extras: Junji and Asako's Simoun Lecture 2; Liner notes: character introductions for Anubituf and Guragief; interview with voice actors Reiko Kiuchi (Anubituf) and Hōko Kuwashima (Guragief); First-pressing bonus: episode 15(1 and 2) eyecatch postcards
7	18–20	BCBA-2512	4934569625120	2007-02-23
On-disc extras: clean opening video (second version with Yun); Gekkan interview with voice actors Mikako Takahashi (Roatreamon), Rika Morinaga (Mamina) and Kaori Nazuka (Yun); Liner notes: character introductions for Mamina, Yun and Roatreamon; interview with Mikako Takahashi, Rika Morinaga and Kaori Nazuka; First-pressing bonus: episode 18(1) and 20(2) eyecatch postcards
8	21–23	BCBA-2513	4934569625137	2007-03-23
On-disc extras: Gekkan interview with voice actors Nana Mizuki (Morinas) and Fumie Mizusawa (Waporif); Tsukkomi Image (ツッコミ映像, Tsukkomi Eizō), selected segments of the anime with humorous captions added; Liner notes: character introductions for Onasia and Anubituf; interview with Rieko Takahashi and Ami Koshimizu; First-pressing bonus: episode 21(2) and 23(1) eyecatch postcards
9	23–26	BCBA-2514	4934569625144	2007-04-25
On-disc extras: Junji and Asako's Simoun Lecture 3; Their Portraits (彼女達の肖像, Kanojotachi no Shōzō), still image gallery for episode 26 locations; Liner notes: introductions for the characters in episode 26; interview with Michi Niino and Rieko Takahashi; First-pressing bonus: episode 26(1 and 2) eyecatch postcards

=== North America ===
Media Blasters announced the Region 1 license for Simoun in May 2007. Their releases are subtitled only (no English dub). The series was released in five volumes.

Volume	Title	Episodes	Catalog number	ISBN	Release date
1	Choir of Pairs	1–6	AWDVD-0750	1-59883-157-7	2007-11-13
On-disc extras: Voice actor contest (from Japanese volume 1), cast interview with Rieko Takahashi (Neviril) and Michi Niino (Aer) (from Japanese volume 2)
2	Orchestra of Betrayal	7–11	AWDVD-0801	1-59883-182-8	2008-02-26
On-disc extras: Staff commentary part 1 by Junji Nishimura and Asako Nishida (from Japanese volume 4), cast interview with Ami Koshimizu (Paraietta) and Michiko Hosogoshi (Kaim) (from Japanese volume 3)
3	Rondo of Loss	12–16	AWDVD-0814	1-59883-224-7	2008-04-08
On-disc extras: Staff commentary part 2 by Junji Nishimura and Asako Nishida (from Japanese volume 6), cast interview with Mamiko Noto (Rimone) and Yukana (Dominura) (from Japanese volume 5)
4	Crescendo of Lamentation	17–21	AWDVD-0827	1-59883-247-6	2008-06-03
On-disc extras: Cast interview with Mikako Takahashi (Roatreamon), Rika Morinaga (Mamina) and Kaori Nazuka (Yun) (from Japanese volume 7)
5	Song of Prayer	22–26	AWDVD-0841	1-59883-274-3	2008-08-05
On-disc extras: Staff commentary part 3 by Junji Nishimura and Asako Nishida (from Japanese volume 9), cast interview with Nana Mizuki (Morinas) and Fumie Mizusawa (Waporif) (from Japanese volume 8), clean opening and ending videos (second opening, with Yun)
