= F-14 Tomcat operational history =

Detailed history of F-14 operations

The Grumman F-14 Tomcat has served with the United States Navy and the Imperial Iranian Air Force, then the Islamic Republic of Iran Air Force after 1979. It operated aboard U.S. aircraft carriers from 1974 to 2006 and remains in service with Iran. In-depth knowledge of its service with Iran is relatively limited.

== U.S. Navy service ==
The F-14 primarily conducted air-to-air and reconnaissance missions with the U.S. Navy until the 1990s, when it was also employed as a long-range strike fighter. It saw considerable action in the Mediterranean Sea and Persian Gulf and was used as a strike platform in the Balkans, Afghanistan and Iraq until its final deployment with the United States in 2006.

=== American withdrawal from Saigon (1975) ===
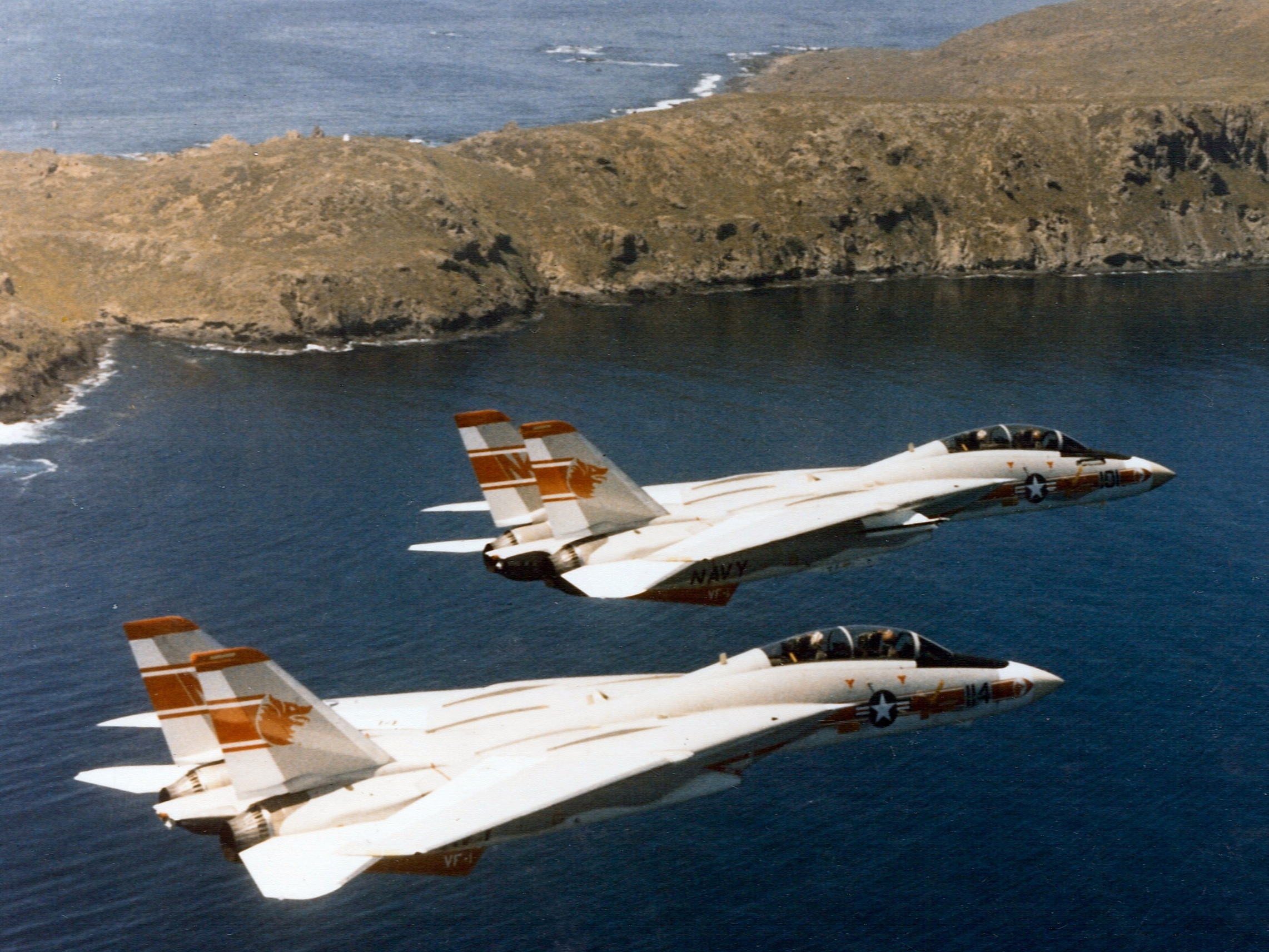
F-14A Tomcats of VF-1 in flight in 1970s

The Tomcat made its operational debut during Operation Frequent Wind, the evacuation of American citizens from Saigon, in April 1975. F-14As from Fighter Squadron 1 (VF-1) and VF-2, operating from USS Enterprise, flew combat air patrols over South Vietnam to provide fighter cover for the evacuation route.

=== Cold War intercepts (1976–1992) ===
An F-14A Tomcat intercepting a Soviet Tupolev Tu-95RTs Bear D maritime recon aircraft over the Pacific Ocean in 1984

VF-142 became the first Atlantic Fleet F-14 squadron to intercept a Soviet Tu-95 "Bear" on 23 April 1976. One of the routine tasks U.S. Navy F-14s performed was intercepting aircraft that approached U.S. carrier groups too closely. Soviet strategic bombers and maritime reconnaissance aircraft regularly patrolled near U.S. carriers during the Cold War and were often escorted away by F-14s.

F-14 Tomcats were the primary multirole fighters mostly intercepting the Tu-95 Bear D aircraft that flew anywhere in the vicinity of U.S. aircraft carriers during the Cold War. U.S. policy was not to let the Bear D come within several hundred miles of an aircraft carrier without an armed escort. During the height of the Cold War, a pair of Bear D aircraft would fly from the Kola peninsula to Cuba every week resulting in frequent intercepts as they passed along the Eastern coast of the United States. During the same time period, annual North Atlantic Treaty Organization (NATO) exercise in the North Sea area elicited daily flights of Bear D aircraft operating in pairs to locate the aircraft carrier(s) in the area. Operations Northern Wedding and Ocean Safari typically brought at least one U.S. Navy carrier into the Greenland–Iceland–United Kingdom (GIUK) gap during the exercise prompting considerable monitoring by Soviet surface ships, submarines, and aircraft. Tomcats were utilized to provide around-the-clock fleet air defense intercepting not only Soviet Bear D aircraft, but also Tu-16 "Badger" maritime strike and M-4 "Bison", An-12 "Cub", and Il-38 "May" surveillance aircraft which routinely attempted to target aircraft carrier battle groups.

In 1976 an F-14 operating from USS John F. Kennedy was lost overboard near Scapa Flow sinking in water 1,890-foot (580 m) deep. The U.S. Navy, concerned that the Soviets might recover the wreckage and its AIM-54 Phoenix missiles, launched an underwater recovery operation costing several million dollars to salvage the wreckage.

=== Operations during the Lebanese Civil War (1976 and 1982–1986) ===
F-14s provided combat air patrols during Operation Fluid Drive, the evacuation of U.S. citizens from Beirut, Lebanon in 1976.

Between 1982 and 1986, F-14s performed combat air patrols and photo-reconnaissance in support of the Multinational Force in Lebanon and U.S. naval operations near the country's coast. Tactical Airborne Reconnaissance Pod System (TARPS) missions were used to identify artillery batteries firing on the peacekeeping force and provided target intelligence for naval gunfire support offshore.

From November 1983 to the Spring of 1984, F-14s from carriers USS Dwight D. Eisenhower with VF-142 and VF-143, USS John F. Kennedy (CV-67) with VF-11 and VF-31 and USS Independence with VF-14 and VF-32 flew almost daily TARPS missions over Lebanon. On 3 December 1983, two VF-31 F-14As from John F. Kennedy came under fire from Syrian anti-aircraft artillery and at least ten surface-to-air missiles while conducting a TARPS mission. The F-14s were not hit and returned safely to the carrier. The next day, Tomcats provided fighter cover for a retaliatory air strike on Syrian positions. On 14 December 1983, Syrian anti-aircraft units fired surface-to-air missiles at a flight VF-32 Swordsmen TARPS F-14 Tomcats. The missiles missed and the U.S. responded with naval gunfire from the battleship USS New Jersey, destroying several anti-aircraft sites.

The Syrian Air Force avoided direct confrontation with U.S. forces, although there was at least one instance when F-14s engaged, but did not open fire on, Syrian aircraft. Two F-14As from VF-11 engaged eight Syrian MiGs over Lebanon; the section flew cover for a TARPS F-14 and was ready to open fire when the four MiGs that were being targeted flew back toward Syria. The other MiGs flew through without engaging.

=== Attempted rescue of American hostages in Iran (1980) ===
In April 1980, F-14s from VF-41 and VF-84 participated in an effort to free American hostages in Iran. The attempted rescue was called off during the early stages of execution.

=== Military operations directed at Libya (1980–1989) ===
F-14s were involved in multiple U.S. military operations directed at Libya between 1980 and 1989. During this period, F-14s shot down four Libyan Air Force aircraft in two aerial engagements over the Mediterranean Sea.

On 21 September 1980, three F-14s from John F. Kennedy challenged eight Libyan fighters attempting to intercept a U.S. Air Force RC-135 reconnaissance plane two hundred miles from the Libyan coast. The Libyans disengaged once confronted by the U.S. fighters.

In the summer of 1981, F-14s from VF-41 and VF-84 performed combat air patrols in support of Freedom of Navigation operations in the Gulf of Sidra. Thirty-five pairs of Libyan Air Force fighters and fighter-bombers were intercepted and driven away from the U.S. fleet by F-14s from USS Nimitz and F-4 "Phantom IIs" from USS Forrestal on the first day of operations. The following day, on 19 August 1981, two Libyan Su-22 "Fitters" opened fire on two VF-41 F-14As with an AA-2 "Atoll" missile. The missile failed to hit either of the F-14s and the American pilots destroyed both Libyan aircraft with AIM-9L "Sidewinder" missiles. These were the first aerial combat victories in U.S. Navy F-14s and the first for the U.S. since the Vietnam War.

From 24 July to 14 August 1983, F-14s assigned to USS Dwight D. Eisenhower were involved in Operation Arid Farmer, the code-name for U.S. military assistance to Sudan, Egypt and the government of Hissène Habré of Chad during the Chadian-Libyan conflict. F-14s performed combat air patrols over waters in and near the Gulf of Sidra during the operation. Several flights of Libyan fighters were intercepted with neither side opening fire.

F-14As from VF-102 came under fire from Libyan SA-5 surface-to-air missiles over the Gulf of Sidra during Freedom of Navigation exercises as part of Operation Attain Document on 24 March 1986. The missiles did not hit the F-14s. Later the same day, F-14As from VF-33 intercepted two Libyan MiG-25 "Foxbats" heading toward the U.S. naval force. The Libyans were outmaneuvered by the Tomcats, which got behind the MiG-25s, but the Americans did not receive permission to open fire. These events and several more surface-to-air missile launches prompted the U.S. Navy to initiate Operation Prairie Fire. F-14 Tomcats provided fighter cover during the operation.

On 15 April 1986, F-14s from VF-33, VF-102, VF-74 and VF-103 participated in Operation El Dorado Canyon, providing fighter cover for a series of air strikes against targets within Libya.

On 4 January 1989, two F-14As from VF-32 assigned to John F. Kennedy shot down two Libyan MiG-23 "Floggers" off the coast of Libya. The Libyan fighters appeared to be maneuvering for a missile firing position when the Americans concluded they were under attack. The MiG-23s were shot down with AIM-7 "Sparrow" and AIM-9 Sidewinder missiles.

=== Somali anti-aircraft fire incident (1983) ===
In April 1983, two F-14As from VF-102, operating from USS America, were fired on by Somali anti-aircraft units with an SA-2 Guideline while on a photo-reconnaissance mission over the port of Berbera in the Gulf of Aden. The Tomcats were on a prearranged mission at the request of the Somali government but were mistaken for attacking Ethiopian MiG-23s. The F-14s were not hit and were able to complete the mission.

=== Invasion of Grenada (1983) ===
F-14s from VF-14 and VF-32, operating from USS Independence, flew combat air patrols and reconnaissance missions in support of Operation Urgent Fury, the U.S. invasion of Grenada in 1983. Tomcats from both squadrons provided fighter cover for Navy attack aircraft. TARPS-equipped F-14s from VF-32 also performed photo-mapping and post-strike damage assessment missions.

=== MS Achille Lauro incident (1985) ===
From 8 to 10 October 1985, F-14s from USS Saratoga participated in operations involving the hijacked Italian cruise liner, MS Achille Lauro. F-14As from VF-74 and VF-103 performed combat air patrols with the additional task of monitoring activity on the sea around Achille Lauro. Members of the U.S. National Security Council devised a plan that involved using Saratoga's F-14s to intercept an aircraft that was to carry the hijackers to safety after U.S. intelligence discovered Egyptian authorities were preparing to put the hijackers on an EgyptAir 737 being flown to Tunisia.

On 10 October 1985, F-14As were launched from Saratoga to perform the intercept. The 737's exact takeoff time, route and altitude were unknown; so the plan involved crisscrossing the airliners's expected flight path over the Mediterranean Sea with an E-2C identifying contacts for the F-14s to perform positive identification on. The F-14s positively identified the correct airliner after four interceptions at night. The Tomcats formed up on the EgyptAir 737 and a U.S. Navy EA-6B jammed all of the airliner's communications except to the F-14s and E-2C. With the implied threat of a shoot-down, the 737's pilot chose to land at the NATO base in Sigonella, Sicily, where the airliner was quickly surrounded by U.S. and Italian security personnel.

=== Intervention in the "Tanker War" (1987–1988) ===
From July 1987 to September 1988, F-14s performed combat air patrols and escort missions in support of Operation Earnest Will during the "Tanker War". On 8 August 1987, the first shots by the U.S. at Iranian forces took place when two VF-21 F-14As from USS Constellation opened fire on two Iranian F-4s that flew toward an American P-3C reconnaissance plane. The U.S. pilots observed two of the three AIM-7 Sparrows that were launched guiding toward one of the F-4s. The F-14 flight leader ordered an egress from the area after seeing one of the missiles explode but before any of the American aircrew could confirm whether the F-4 was actually shot down. U.S. spokesmen downplayed the incident, possibly to avoid public and Congressional backlash in the United States to the then-recent operations in the Persian Gulf. Some official statements suggested the F-14s fired warning shots or that the radar contacts were not real.

F-14s from USS Ranger provided fighter cover during Operation Nimble Archer in October 1987. Six months later, F-14s from Enterprise provided fighter cover and escort for U.S. naval vessels and strike aircraft involved in Operation Praying Mantis in April 1988.

=== The Persian Gulf War (1990–1991) ===
Tomcats performed combat air patrols in protection of U.S. carrier battle groups and coalition forces deploying to Saudi Arabia during Operation Desert Shield. The Dwight D. Eisenhower and Independence battle groups, both of which had four F-14 squadrons between them, were the only U.S. assets capable of immediately responding to the Iraqi invasion of Kuwait and deterring any incursions into Saudi Arabia in August 1990. U.S. forces deploying to the theater did so initially under the protection of naval air cover.

Ten F-14 squadrons participated in the war against Iraq from 17 January to 28 February 1991 during Operation Desert Storm. Tomcats provided escort protection for attack aircraft, long range defense of ships, combat air patrols and performed tactical reconnaissance missions with TARPS. A total of 4,124 sorties were flown by the 99 F-14s in theater. The greater part of the sorties were air-to-air missions, although Tomcats were left with few aerial targets to contend with due in part to the rapid disintegration of Iraq's air defense system by coalition attacks, which grounded the majority of Iraq's air force.

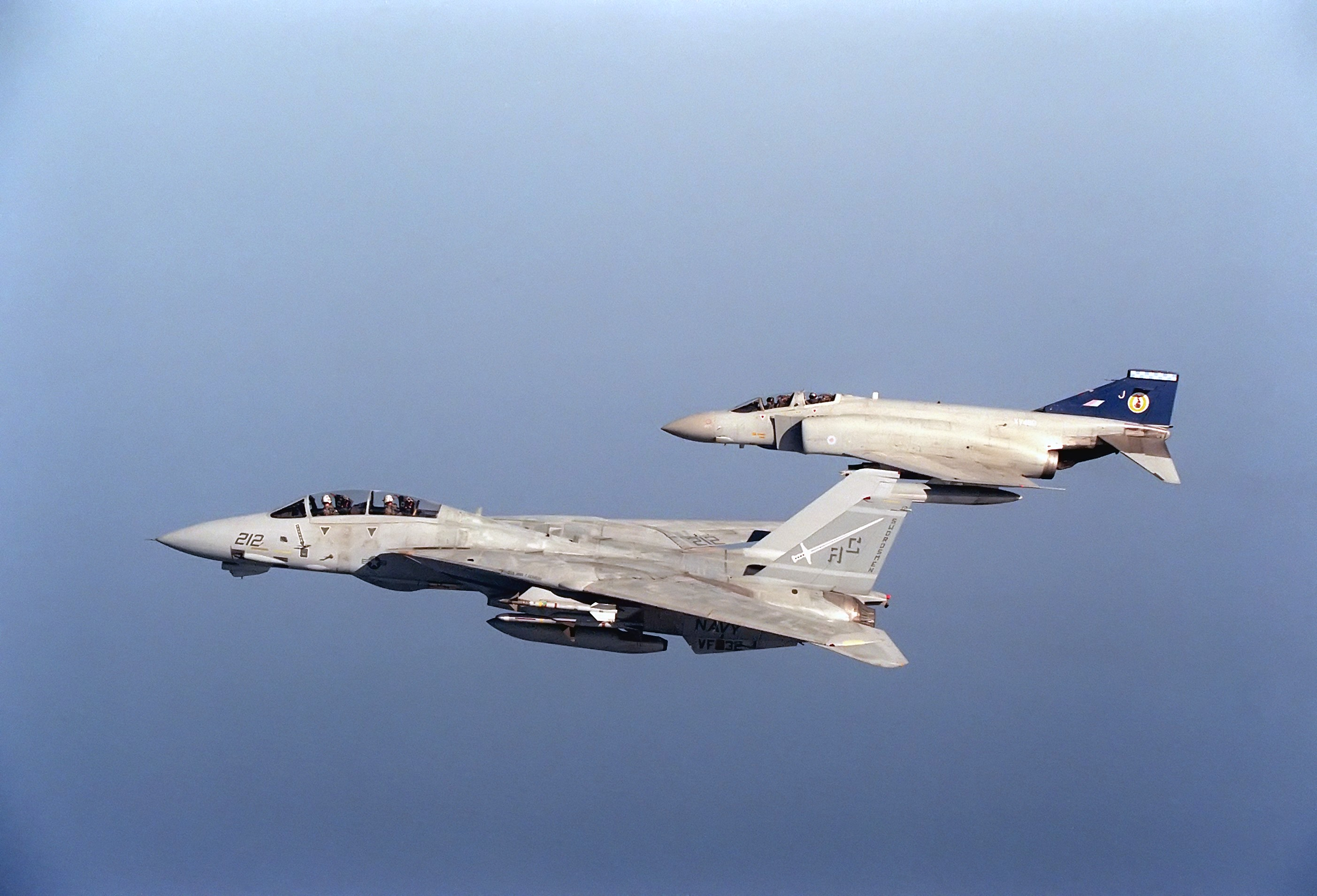
F-14A of VF-32 alongside an F-4M Phantom of the RAF during a simulated air combat sortie in December 1990

Compared to its U.S. Air Force counterpart, the F-15, there were greater limitations on the use of beyond visual range missiles for the F-14 during Operation Desert Storm. This was the result of the U.S. Navy not having developed the systems and procedures required to integrate its carrier air groups into a joint air component command, as Cold War-era tactics had the Navy operating on its own. Navy fighters were not able to solve the strict rules of engagement (ROE) using most of their on-board sensors and relied on outside clearance such as U.S. Air Force E-3 Sentries to receive permission to fire. In contrast, U.S. Air Force F-15s had the systems necessary to independently identify enemy aircraft from beyond visual range and were given the primary overland combat air patrol stations to intercept Iraqi aircraft that made it into the air.

Political reasons have also been attributed to limiting aerial engagements involving F-14s during the Gulf War. According to accounts from Navy pilots, Navy fighters were called off from Iraqi aircraft so that other coalition fighters could engage them. One event used to support this notion occurred on 24 January 1991, when a U.S. Air force E-3 Sentry did not inform U.S. naval units of a pair of Iraqi Mirage F-1EQs that flew into the Persian Gulf. Saudi F-15s were vectored instead of F-14s that were in a better position to shoot down the Iraqi fighters. Another explanation for why the F-14s did not intercept the Mirage F-1s stems from some of the procedural and technical difficulties U.S. Air Force and U.S. Navy assets had in passing tactical information to each other. The E-3 could not directly contact the F-14s in a timely manner since they were under the control of the cruiser USS Worden, which was not able to get a clear radar picture to accurately vector the F-14s.

Tomcat aircrews that encountered Iraqi fighters found that the Iraqis would disengage and flee once tracked by the F-14's radar and pursued. On the first day of Desert Storm, two Iraqi MiG-21s attempting to escape from four VF-103 F-14Bs flew directly into a flight of four F/A-18s that shot down both MiGs. According to interviewed F-15 pilots, several kills by F-15s were made in a similar manner, with Iraqi aircraft being downed after retreating from Tomcats.

In addition to the air-to-air duties, Tomcats supported the coalition's need for battle damage assessments (BDA) and locating Scud missile launch sites by performing tactical reconnaissance missions utilizing TARPS. These missions helped fill in intelligence gathering gaps when cloudy skies prevented the use of space-based surveillance systems.

On 21 January 1991, an F-14B with its pilot, Lieutenant Devon Jones, and Radar Intercept Officer, Lieutenant Lawrence Slade, of VF-103 was shot down by an SA-2 surface-to-air missile while on an escort mission over Al Asad Air Base. Jones was recovered the following day, but Slade was captured and held as a prisoner of war until his release on 4 March 1991. This incident marked the only time a U.S. Navy F-14 was lost to hostile fire.

One air-to-air kill was credited to the F-14 during the war. An Iraqi Mil Mi-8 helicopter was shot down by a VF-1 F-14A using an AIM-9 Sidewinder on 6 February 1991.

The Tomcat faced an early retirement due to budget cuts following the end of both the Persian Gulf and Cold Wars in 1991. However, the retirement of the Grumman A-6 Intruder was impetus for the U.S. Navy to continue to use the F-14 by upgrading it with a precision strike capability.

=== Interwar air operations over Iraq (1991–2003) ===
Following Operation Desert Storm, F-14s patrolled the no-fly zones that were established over Iraq for Operations Provide Comfort, Southern Watch and Northern Watch. F-14s performed combat air patrol, fighter escort, aerial reconnaissance and air interdiction missions in support of these operations until the 2003 Invasion of Iraq. TARPS-equipped F-14s provided Joint Task Force Southwest Asia with the ability to monitor Iraqi military activity on a daily basis in southern Iraq, making the Tomcat a primary asset in Operation Southern Watch.

F-14s were often part of strike packages when conducting missions in support of Operation Southern Watch. During a number of these missions, the Tomcat's long range allowed it to stay on station for twice as long as other U.S. Navy tactical aircraft. F-14s were able to remain on station after other Navy aircraft that made the ingress with them had to be replaced. The Tomcats would depart with the strike package after the pilots of the second set of aircraft declared that they needed fuel.

On 16 December 1998, F-14Bs from VF-32 took part in a 33-aircraft strike package that spearheaded Operation Desert Fox. The first night of the four-day operation was conducted by the U.S. Navy only. On 19 December, the last day of the operation, USS Carl Vinson arrived in the Persian Gulf and VF-213 joined the air strikes, taking the F-14D into combat for the first time. In addition to performing strike missions, F-14s from both squadrons conducted escort combat air patrols for U.S. Air Force B-1B bombers that were committed to the operation beginning on 17 December. Multiple firsts for the F-14 were achieved during Desert Fox, including the first GBU-24 "Paveway III" laser-guided bombs dropped in combat by the U.S. Navy, the first multiple GBU-24 drop by any platform in combat, the first combat use of the Low Altitude Navigation and Targeting Infrared for Night (LANTIRN) targeting pod system, the first autonomous delivery of a GBU-10/16/24 laser-guided bomb by an F-14, and the first use of night vision devices in combat. VF-32 alone dropped 111,054 pounds (50,373 kg) of munitions during 16 strike missions and 38 sorties during the operation.

Two F-14Ds from VF-213 engaged several Iraqi aircraft challenging the no-fly zone on 5 January 1999. During the engagement, the F-14s were approached by a pair of MiG-23s that turned away before they were fired on. The F-14 aircrews then focused on a MiG-25 that continued to advance and launched two AIM-54C Phoenix missiles at it from a long distance. Both AIM-54s' rocket motors failed and the missiles did not hit their target. All of the Iraqi aircraft were able fly back out of the no-fly zone, although a MiG-23 was reported to have run out of fuel and crashed before reaching its base. This engagement marked the first time the U.S. Navy launched AIM-54s in combat. At the conclusion of VF-213's 1998–1999 cruise, the squadron had executed 19 strikes, dropped 20 laser-guided bombs with a 64-percent success rate, supported 11 combined strikes, flown 70 missions, logged 230 sorties with over 615 combat hours, and performed 45 reconnaissance missions imaging more than 580 targets.

On 9 September 1999, a VF-2 F-14 engaged an Iraqi MiG-23 with an AIM-54 Phoenix missile. Neither aircraft was damaged. F-14s also patrolled the no-fly zones in Iraq during Operation Northern Watch and Operation Southern Watch from the 1990s until 2003.

=== Balkans (1994–1995 and 1999) ===
In August and September 1995, NATO launched Operation Deliberate Force, and USS Theodore Roosevelt and its air wing supported the operation. F-14s from VF-41 participated in strikes. USS America and its own air wing also supported the operation, F-14s from VF-102 participated in air strikes. VF-41 is credited with being the first F-14 unit to drop laser-guided bombs in combat when, on 5 September 1995, two F-14As attacked an ammunition dump in eastern Bosnia. The bomb's targets were identified by laser indicators from F/A-18s because the F-14 was not yet cleared to carry the LANTIRN pod. VF-41 alone logged 600 combat hours and 530 sorties during this cruise.

VF-14 and VF-41 took part in Operation Allied Force, NATO's aerial campaign against Serbian operations in Kosovo, between 9 April 1999 and 9 June 1999. F-14s of VF-14 dropped 350 laser-guided 1,000-pound (450 kg) bombs, in addition to other air-to-ground ordnance. F-14s flew combat air patrol, escort, and strike missions; acted as Forward Air Controllers; and performed TARPS missions. VF-41 dropped the last bombs of the war on a dummy SA-9 surface-to-air missile launcher inside the Kosovo border near the peace-signing site on 9 June 1999.

=== Operation Enduring Freedom (2001–2003) ===
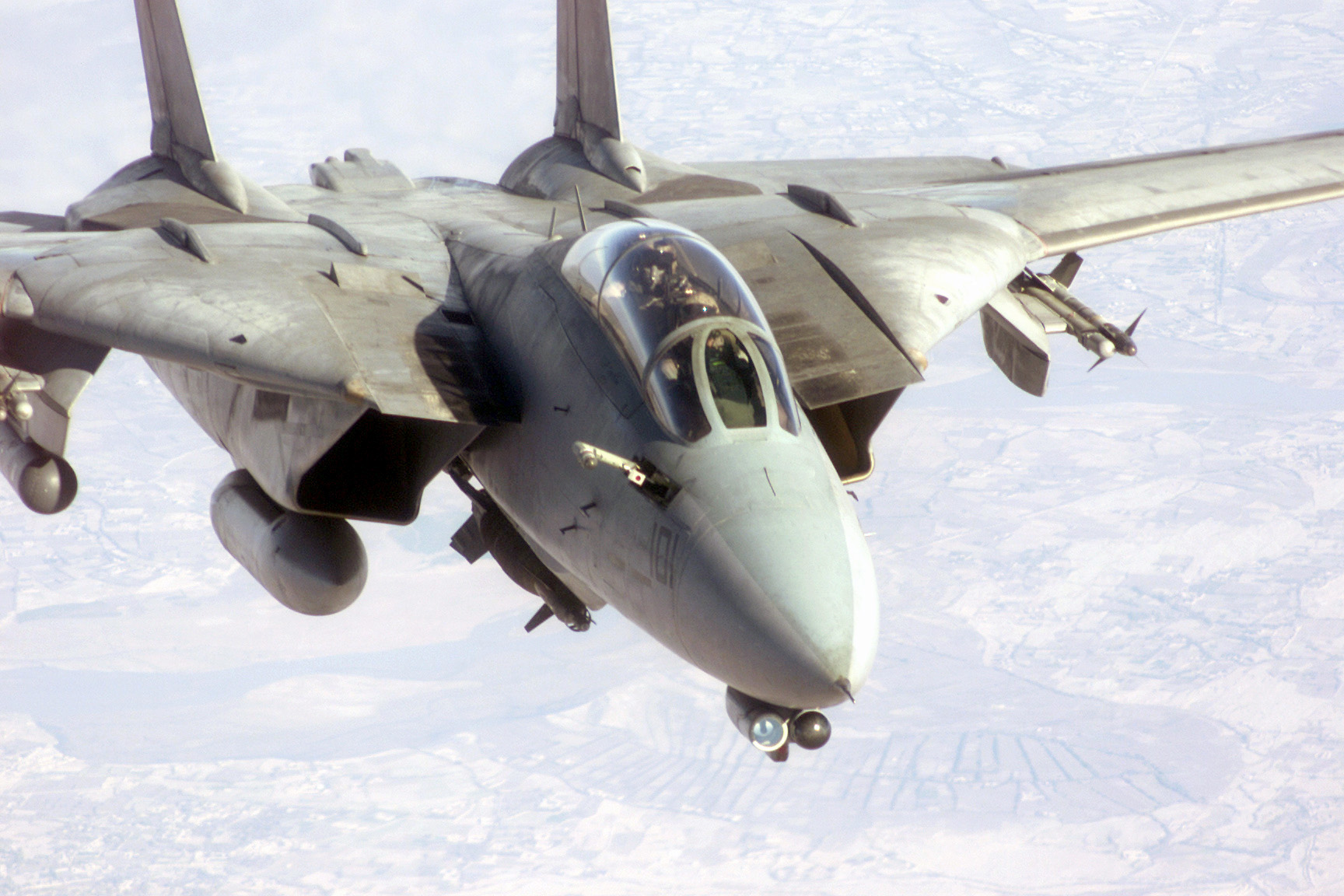
An F-14D from VF-213 prepares to refuel over Afghanistan.

After the September 11, 2001 attacks, no fewer than eight F-14 squadrons participated in Operation Enduring Freedom, flying long-range missions from the Indian Ocean to strike targets around Afghanistan and conducting reconnaissance and ground support missions. From the start of Operation Enduring Freedom to the end of Operation Anaconda, F-14s from VF-14, VF-41, VF-102, VF-211, and VF-213 dropped more than 1,334,000 pounds (605,000 kg) of ordnance on targets. VF-11 and VF-143, alongside CVW-7, dropped 64,000 pounds (29,000 kg) of ordnance, both the "Red Rippers" and the "Pukin' Dogs" making history as they dropped JDAM bombs from the F-14 for the first time during combat. VF-103 arrived in Afghanistan in June 2002 when combat was scarce, and the "Jolly Rogers" did not get the opportunity to drop any bombs during the operation.

During the war, VF-213 logged over 500 combat sorties, 2,600 combat hours, and dropped 435,000 pounds (197,000 kg) of ordnance (452 bombs) during their 10 weeks over Afghanistan; the "Black Lions" also had the distinct honor of dropping the first bombs of Operation Enduring Freedom. VF-102 dropped more bombs—680 of them, totaling 420,000 pounds (190,000 kg)—and logged more combat hours (more than 5,000) than any other F-14 unit that took part in the operation, and the unit dropped an additional 50,000 pounds (23,000 kg) of ordnance. VF-211 flew 1,250 combat sorties, logging 4,200 combat hours and dropping 100,000 pounds (45,000 kg) of ordnance. VF-14 led more strikes than any other squadron in CVW-8, and dropped 174 laser-guided bombs, totaling 179,324 pounds (81,340 kg) and buddy-lased 28 AGM-65 Maverick missiles and 23 laser-guided bombs, and like their sister squadron VF-41, they flew the oldest jets in the fleet. VF-41 dropped more than 200,000 pounds (91,000 kg) of bombs (202 laser-guided bombs) with an 82 percent hit rate, which was a level of accuracy that had never previously been achieved in the U.S. Navy.

=== Operation Iraqi Freedom and Final Deployment (2003–2006) ===
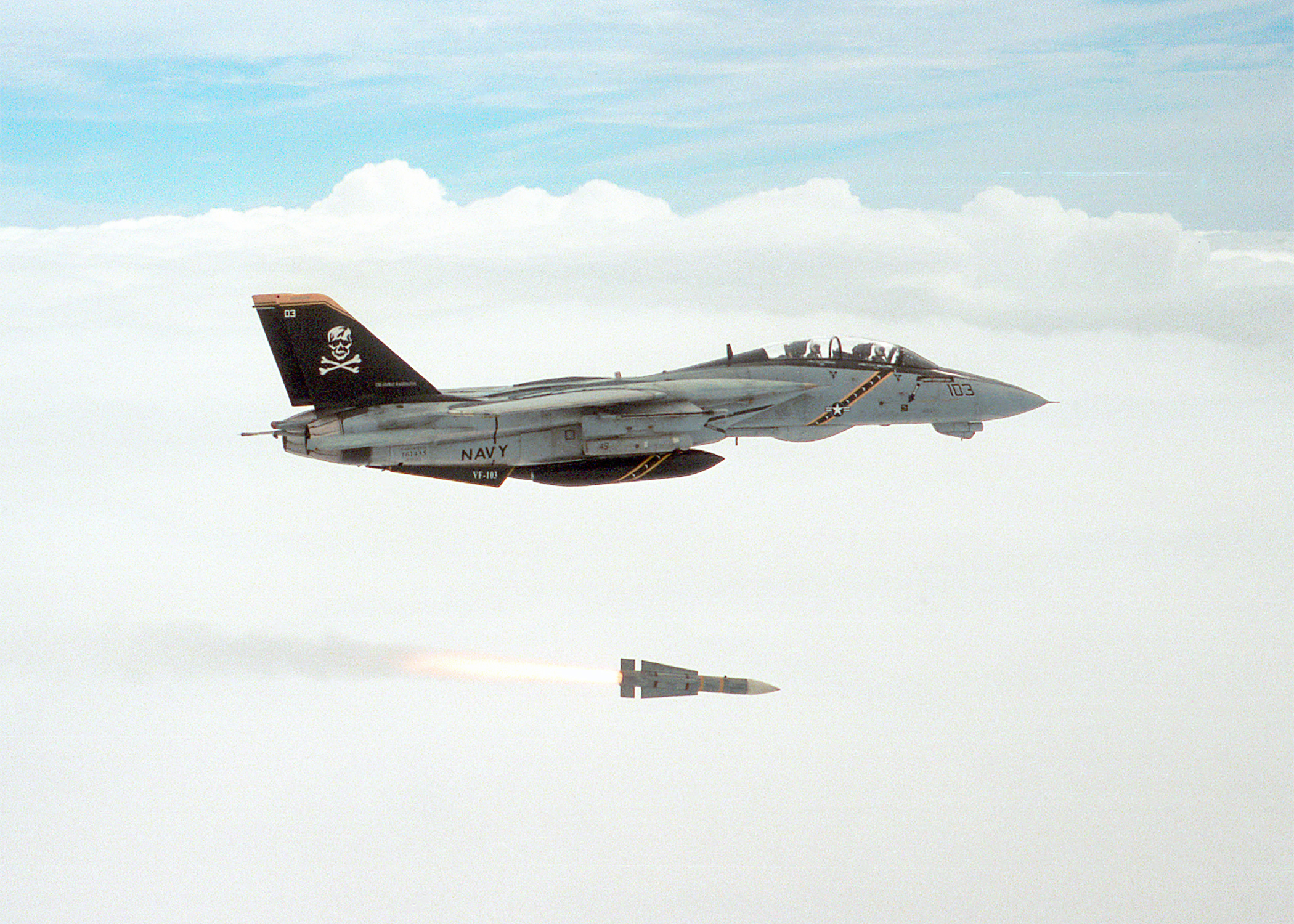
An F-14 launches an AIM-54 Phoenix during training in 2002

F-14s from VF-2, VF-31, VF-32, VF-154, and VF-213 participated in Operation Iraqi Freedom. The F-14s flew 2,547 combat sorties and dropped 1,452 GBU, JDAM, and MK-82 bombs with just one lost jet (from engine failure). F-14s led strikes on Baghdad, attacking targets such as the Iraqi Ministry of Information's Salman Pak radio relay transmitter facility at Al Hurriyah (southwest of central Baghdad) with JDAM bombs. Another notable mission involved TARPS-equipped F-14Ds dropping four Mark 82 bombs on Saddam Hussein's Presidential yacht Al-Mansur (The Victor). F-14s also supported ground troops during the war and acted as Forward Air Controllers for other aircraft. An aircrew from VF-32 was involved in the worst friendly-fire incident in the war when the crew attacked a U.S. Special Forces convoy in northern Iraq, believing they were Iraqi forces.

During the F-14's last three years in service, the remaining units all deployed to the Persian Gulf region in support of the U.S. forces in Iraq. The final deployment for the F-14 was between September 2005 and March 2006 with VF-31 and VF-213. These two units collectively completed 1,163 combat sorties, totaling 6,876 flight hours. They dropped 9,500 pounds (4,300 kg) of ordnance during reconnaissance, surveillance, and close air support missions in support of the war in Iraq.

== Iranian service ==
Before the Islamic Revolution the Shah of Iran, Mohammad Reza Pahlavi arranged to arm the Imperial Iranian Air Force with 80 Grumman F-14A Tomcats and 714 AIM-54 Phoenix missiles in a deal worth US$2 billion, out of which 274 were delivered for US$150 million, 150 embargoed after the revolution and the additional 290 cancelled. In the 1970s Pahlavi Iran looked for an air superiority fighter to counter Soviet air incursions of MiG-25 fighters. In October 1978, two Imperial Iranian Air Force F-14As intercepted a high-and-fast–flying Soviet MiG-25 over the Caspian Sea tracking it for two minutes and forcing it to abort a reconnaissance run over Iran. By the time of the Iranian Revolution 79 of the aircraft had been delivered; the 80th and final was retained by the US.

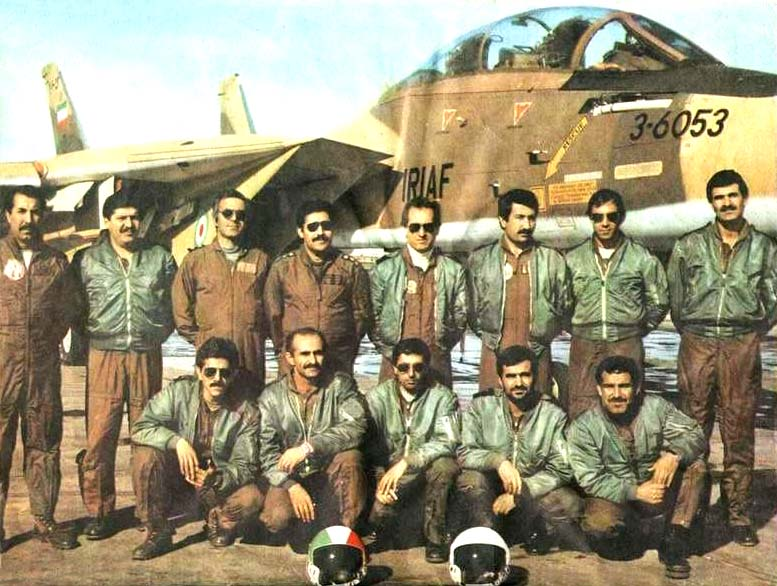
The first squadron of Islamic Republic of Iran Air Force F-14 Tomcat pilots, at Shiraz Air Base.

By September 1980, the Islamic Republic of Iran Air Force (IRIAF) managed to make an increasing number of airframes operational, despite immense problems due to repeated purges of its officers. Some of those officers were executed; others were imprisoned, forced into exile, or forced to take early retirement. The IRIAF survived these times, and its Tomcats were to become involved in the war against Iraq, scoring their first kill on 7 September 1980.

There is limited information available about the service of F-14s in the Iran–Iraq War. Western intelligence indicates that the IRIAF was in decline at the onset of the war in September 1980, and it is rumored that some level of sabotage was committed on the F-14s by either Americans or Iranians loyal to the Shah, during the Iranian Revolution. Following the overthrow of the Shah, most Iranian F-14 pilots and technicians trained in the United States fled from Iran, fearing their association with the Shah's regime, and their time in the United States would endanger them. Only two pilots out of the original flight class chose to remain in Iran. Their fears proved correct, and a number of the original Iranian F-14 crews and technicians who remained were jailed or executed by the new regime. Eventually, several jailed F-14 pilots were released when war broke out with Iraq.

The United States estimated that the IRIAF was able to keep between 15 and 20 F-14s operational by cannibalizing parts from other examples. The IRIAF claims a higher figure, and was able to assemble 25 aircraft for an 11 February 1985 fly-over of Tehran. Despite the U.S embargo following the Islamic Revolution, Iran was able to acquire parts for its Tomcats; these came via the Iran-Contra arms deal, collusion with Israel and the Kingdom of Saudi Arabia.

A single F-14 was present during aerial flybys alongside other active combat aircraft by the Islamic Republic of Iran Air Force at the Islamic Republic of Iran Army Day on April 18, 2022.

=== Role ===
GlobalSecurity indicates that Iran flew the F-14 in an AWACS-type role. To counter, Iraqi Mirage F1EQs flew low-altitude profiles, popping up briefly to illuminate and launch missiles against the F-14s; several Tomcats were lost in this manner. GlobalSecurity also reports that less than 20 aircraft were still airworthy as of 2000, and cited one report that only seven can be airborne at one time.

It was thought for multiple years that Iran used the fighter primarily as an airborne radar controller, escorted and protected by other fighters, but later information indicates this was incorrect. While the IRIAF did husband its fleet of F-14s, the aircraft were used aggressively when needed, even escorting strike packages deep into Iraqi airspace. Initially, the IRIAF F-14s flew intensive CAP patrols, some lasting nine hours, over main bases. IRIAF Tomcats often escorted tankers supporting strike packages heading into Iraq, scanning over the border with their radars and intercepting inbound Iraqi aircraft. With the AWG-9 radar and long range AIM-54 and medium range AIM-7 missiles, the Tomcats could be used as offensive weapons without leaving Iranian airspace.

United States AWACS aircraft observed the downing of an Iraqi Tupolev Tu-22 "Blinder" bomber, and the downing of at least one F-14. Western sources estimate four kills against four to five losses; the official Iranian estimate is 35–45 kills, and 12 losses, all reportedly due to engine failure during combat.

=== Armament ===
Also unresolved is the extent of usage of the AIM-54 Phoenix missile. Most Western sources indicate that sabotage prevented their use, although other sources claim that up to 25 planes were downed by AIM-54s before Iran's supply ran out. The Iranian F-14s used the AIM-7 Sparrow and AIM-9 Sidewinder air-to-air missiles as primary armament; Iran is reportedly developing a domestic copy of the Sparrow, as well as the Phoenix.

=== Combat history ===
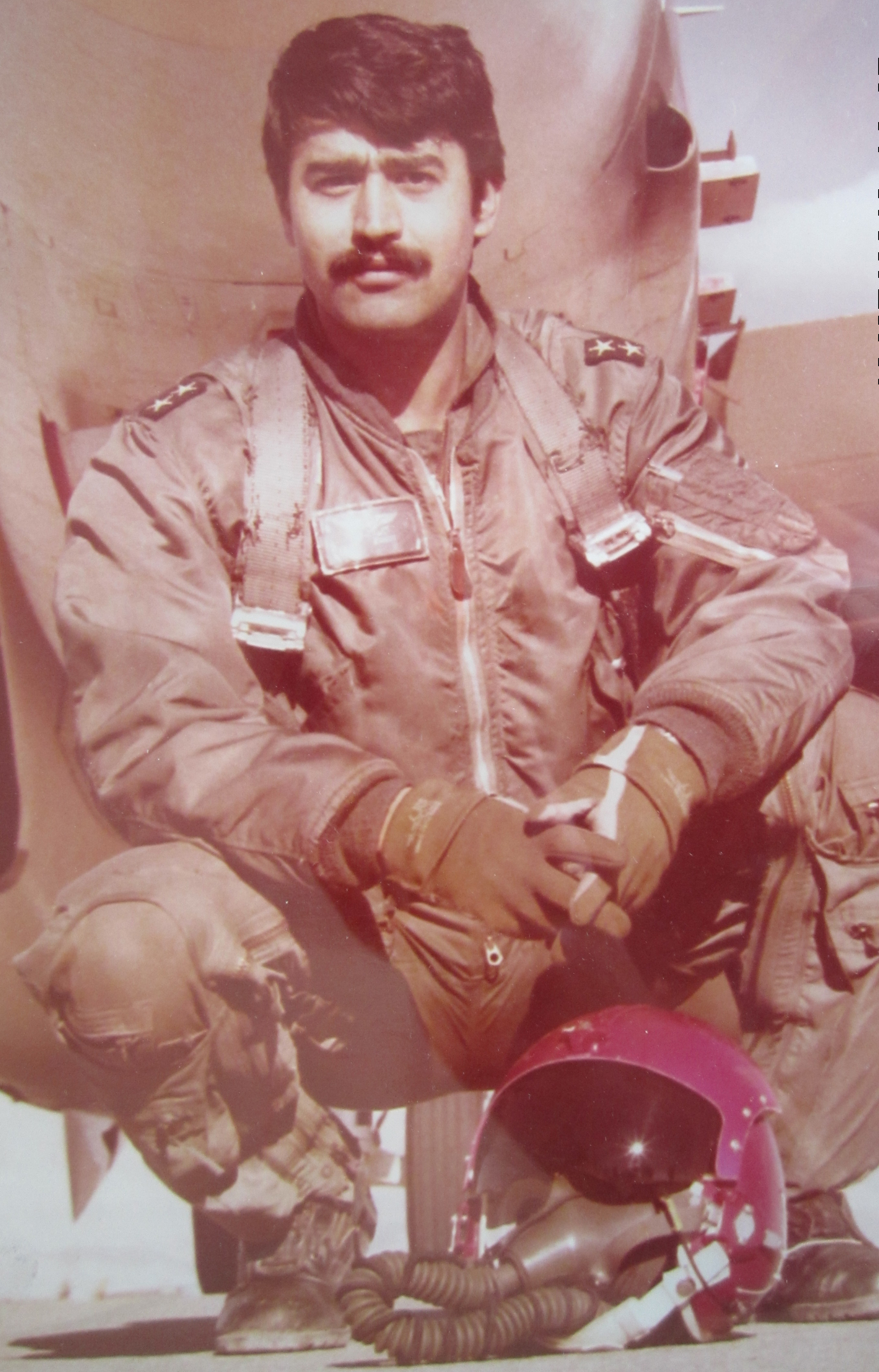
Jalil Zandi, one of the most successful F-14 pilots

In 2004, Tom Cooper published Iranian F-14 Tomcat Units in Combat, based mainly on primary interviews with Iranian pilots. The book makes multiple claims that contradict previous reports. In particular, Cooper cites an Iranian claim of F-14s having up to 159 kills, and that in one incident, four Iraqi aircraft were shot down with one AIM-54 (The missile's warhead exploded between them and severely damaged them).

By 1980, with the prospect of war with Iraq becoming ever more likely, most of the 77 surviving F-14 airframes were found to be in non-operational condition, or at least had non-functioning radars. As a result, F-14 pilots were forced to rely on ground control for their first wartime patrol and intercept missions. Within a few days of the start of the war, a dozen or so F-14s were made operational.

— Tom Cooper, "Persian Cats", Smithsonian Air & Space

The first confirmed kill by an F-14A during the Iran–Iraq War occurred before the formal start of hostilities: on 7 September 1980, an IRIAF F-14A destroyed an Iraqi Mil Mi-25 (export variant of the Mil Mi-24) Hind helicopter using its 20mm Vulcan cannon. (Note: Quote: "for political reasons, the pilot's name will probably never be known." It has been reliably confirmed that, after missing with several AIM-9P Sidewinders, the pilot turned his M61A1 Vulcan cannon on the target, thus scoring the first ever Tomcat gun victory.) Six days later, Major Mohammad-Reza Attaie shot down an Iraqi MiG-21 with an AIM-54 Phoenix while flying a border patrol. A single AIM-54 fired in July 1982 by Captain Hashemi may have destroyed two Iraqi MiG-23s flying in close formation.

Cooper claims the AIM-54s were used only sporadically during the start of the war, most likely because of a shortage of qualified radar intercept officers, and then more frequently in 1981 and 1982—until the lack of thermal batteries suspended the missiles' use in 1986. There were also rumors that suggested that Iran's Tomcat fleet would be upgraded with avionics derived from the MiG-31 "Foxhound". However, IRIAF officials and pilots insist that the Soviets were never allowed near the F-14s, and never received any F-14 or AIM-54 technology. Also, the AIM-54 missile was never out of service in the IRIAF, though the stocks of operational missiles were low at times. Clandestine deliveries from US sources and black market purchases supplied spares to top up the Phoenix reserves during the war, and spares deliveries from the US in the 1990s have also helped. Furthermore, an attempt was made to adapt the MIM-23 Hawk surface-to-air missiles that were also a carry-over from the pre-revolution period, to be used as air-to-air missiles for the F-14; at least two F-14s have been successfully modified to carry the hybrid weaponry.

All in all, the IRIAF was said to have launched possibly 70 to 90 AIM-54A missiles, and 60–70 of those scored. Of those, almost 90 percent of the AIM-54A missiles fired were used against Iraqi fighters and fighter-bombers. Only about a dozen victories by AIM-54s were claimed to be against fast, high-flying targets such as the MiG-25 or Tu-22 'Blinder'.

By the close of the war, both sides were unable to obtain new aircraft or parts, and aerial combat had become rare, since neither side could afford to lose aircraft they could not replace. In particular, the IRIAF F-14 fleet suffered from a lack of trained technicians, and by 1984 only 40 F-14s were still in service. By 1986, that number had dropped to just 25. The F-14 was relegated to protecting Iran's vital oil refining and export infrastructure; in this role, they often encountered French-built, Iraqi Dassault Mirage F1EQ fighters attempting to attack Iranian oil pipelines.

One IRIAF pilot distinguished himself in combat by becoming the all-time top scoring F-14 ace. Major Jalil Zandi is credited with shooting down eight Iraqi aircraft. (Note: The authors write: "Zandi survived... numerous air battles with Iraqi Air Force, to claim a total of 9 confirmed (through examination of US intelligence documents released according to FOIA inquiry) and two or three probable kills. It is possible that he scored between 11 and 12 air-to-air victories, thus becoming the most successful F-14 pilot ever, and certainly the leading IRIAF ace.") He is additionally credited with three probable kills, bringing his total to 11 air victories. These include four MiG-23s, two Su-22s, two MiG-21 and three Mirage F1s.

Another notable Iranian pilot was Major Rahnavard, who on 16 February 1982 is reputed to have shot down four Iraqi fighter jets in two separate encounters over Kharg Island. Records indicate that two of his confirmed kills were Mirage F1s.

In the fall of 2015, a video surfaced of Iranian F-14s escorting Russian Tu-95 Bear bombers as they performed air strikes against the Islamic State of Iraq and the Levant.

Following the start of the 2026 US-Iran war, Iran has lost large numbers of F-14s, and it is estimated that there are between 20 and 30 airframes left, with only a fraction of those airworthy.

== See also ==
- List of Iranian aerial victories during the Iran–Iraq war
- List of Iraqi aerial victories during the Iran–Iraq war
- Operation Kaman 99
- Operation Morvarid
