= Fakour-90 =

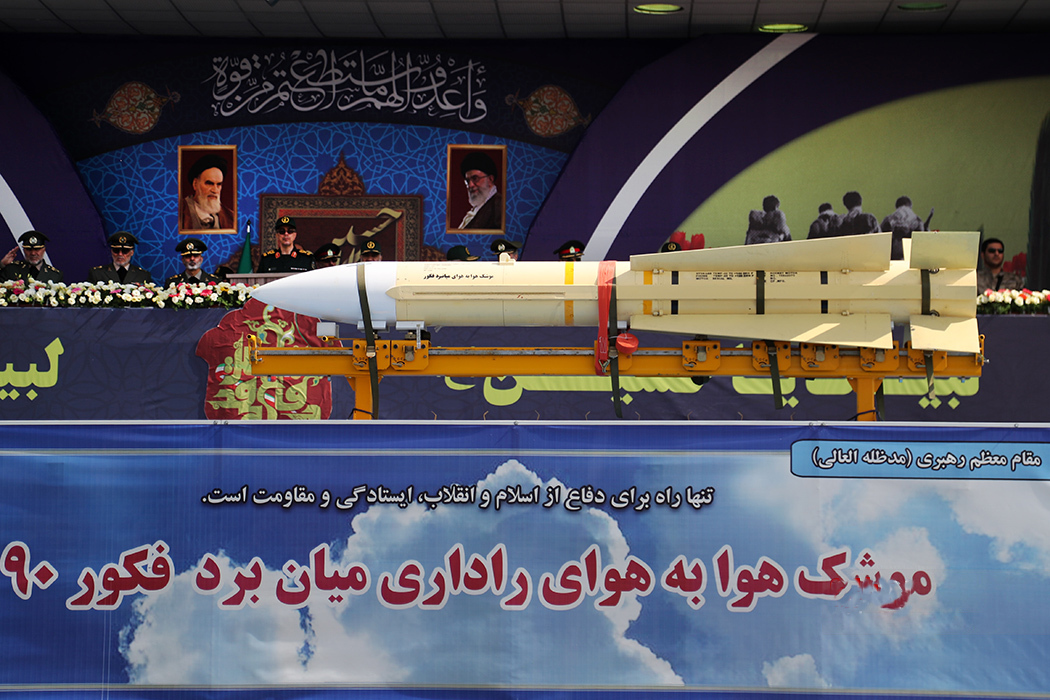
- A Fakour-90 missile at a parade in 2019
- Type: Beyond-visual-range air-to-air missile
- Place of origin: Iran

Service history
- In service: Operational
- Used by: IRIAF

Production history
- Designer: Ministry of Defence and Armed Forces Logistics

Specifications
- Mass: 450 kg (990 lb)
- Length: 4 m (13 ft)
- Diameter: 370 mm (15 in)
- Effective firing range: 150 km (93 mi)
- Warhead: High explosive blast-fragmentation
- Maximum speed: Mach 5
- Guidance system: inertial guidance, two way data link, active radar homing
- Launch platform: F-14, F-4 Phantom II, Su-24

The Fakour-90 (Persian: فکور ۹۰, lit. 'Wisdom-90') is an Iranian air-to-air missile based on the AIM-54 Phoenix and the MIM-23 Hawk. It is solely deployed on Iran's F-14 Tomcats. While not confirmed for use in service, it has also been tested for usage on Iranian F-4 Phantom II & Su-24.

== History ==
The missile was developed by the Iranian Army, the Ministry of Defence and Armed Forces Logistics, and the Air Force. In October 2011, Iran announced that the missile had reached the stage of mass production.

In April 2017, Fakour-90 long range air to air missile was officially unveiled during a visit by Hassan Rouhani from exhibition of latest achievements of defense ministry of Iran. Iran's state TV showed a video related to this exhibition including test firing a Fakour-90 missile by an F-14 Tomcat of IRIAF.

On 23 July 2018, the Iranian military announced the Fakour radar-guided air-to-air missile was now being mass-produced. A ceremony attended by Iranian defence minister Amir Hatami was held to mark the announcement, during which at least six missiles were displayed as well as the front ends of another five. Hatami claimed the missile could be used with a variety of aircraft. The Iranian media reported that it has a range of 150 km, a speed of Mach 5, and a guidance system that enables it to hit a target independently of the launch aircraft's radar.

Although most sources reported that the Fakour-90 is a copy of the AIM-54, some analysts suggested that the Fakour-90 was actually an air-launched version of the MIM-23 Hawk missile with control surfaces from the AIM-54. Analysis of the images identified the rocket motor being "M112" which is used on the Hawk as well as cable raceway similar to the Hawk. The Fakour-90 was also criticized for having less range than the original AIM-54 missiles.

== See also ==
- AIM-54 Phoenix
- MIM-23 Hawk
