= AIM-54 Phoenix =

American long-range air-to-air missile

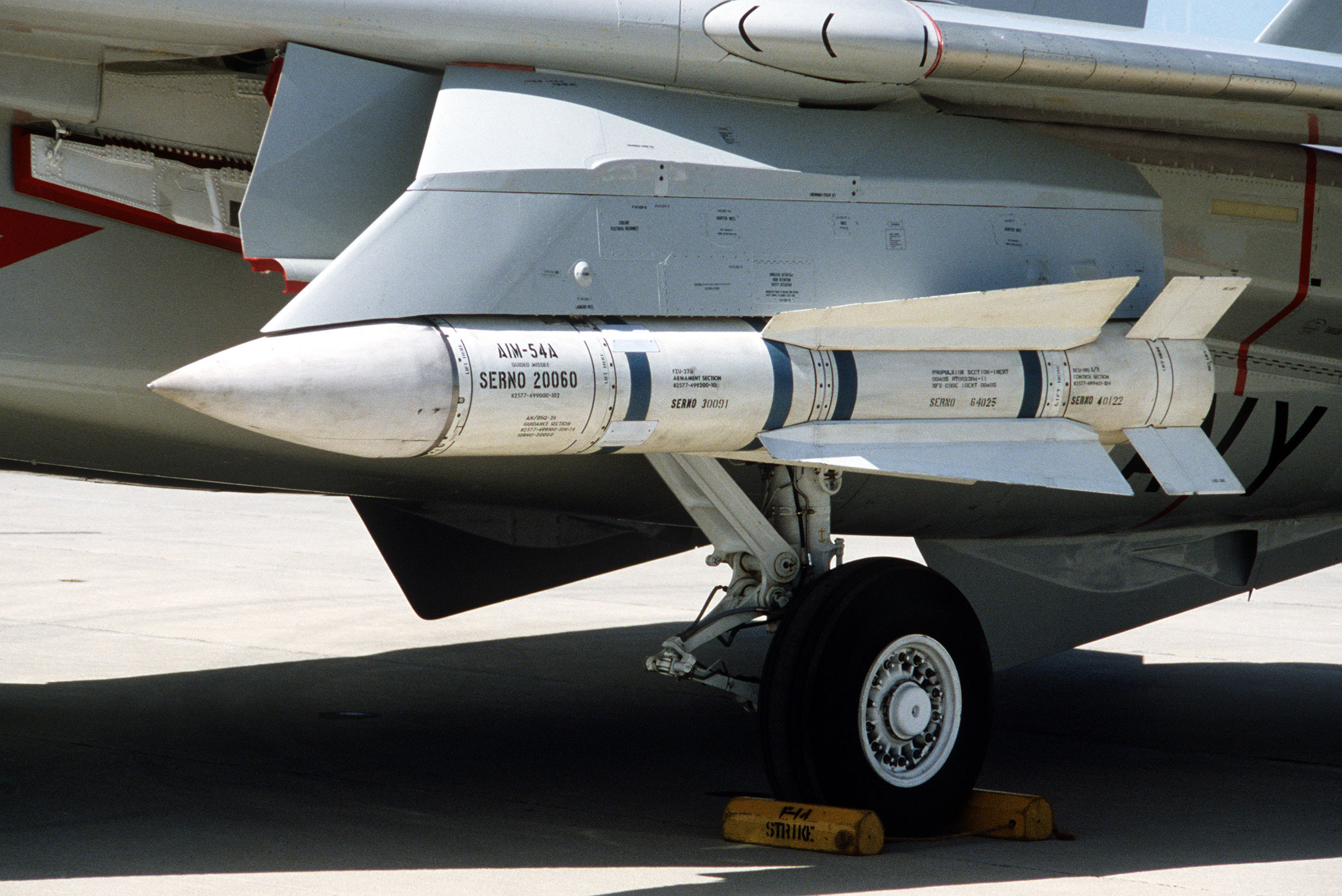
- AIM-54A on an F-14 at NAS Patuxent River, 1984
- Type: Long range BVR air-to-air missile
- Place of origin: United States

Service history
- In service: 1974–2012
- Used by: United States Navy (former); Iranian Air Force (former)

Production history
- Designer: Hughes Aircraft Company
- Designed: 1960–1966
- Manufacturer: Hughes Aircraft Company; Raytheon Corporation
- Developed into: Fakour-90
- Unit cost: US$477,131 (1974 FY)
- Produced: 1966-1993

Specifications
- Mass: AIM-54A/B - 976 lb (443 kg); AIM-54C – 1,015 lb (460 kg)
- Length: 12 ft 9 1/2 in (3.9 m)
- Diameter: 15 in (380 mm)
- Wingspan: 2 ft 11 1/2 in (0.9 m)
- Warhead: AIM-54A/B - HE continuous rod; AIM-54C – HE Mk 82; WDU‐29/B continuous rod
- Warhead weight: 133 lb (60.33 kg)
- Detonation mechanism: Proximity fuze
- Engine: Solid propellant rocket motor
- Operational range: AIM-54A/B - 72.9 nmi (135.0 km; 83.9 mi); AIM-54C – 99.4 nmi (184.1 km; 114.4 mi)
- Flight ceiling: 103,500 ft (31.5 km)
- Maximum speed: AIM-54A/B - Mach 4.3 (1,460 m/s; 4,800 ft/s); AIM-54C – Mach 5 (1,700 m/s; 5,600 ft/s)
- Guidance system: Semi-active radar homing and terminal phase active radar homing
- Launch platform: Grumman F-14 Tomcat
- References: Janes

The AIM-54 Phoenix is an American active radar-guided, beyond-visual-range air-to-air missile (AAM), carried in clusters of up to six missiles on the Grumman F-14 Tomcat, its only operational launch platform.

The AIM-54 Phoenix was the United States' only operational long-range AAM during its service life; its operational capabilities were supplemented by the AIM-7 Sparrow (and later, the AIM-120 AMRAAM), which served as the primary medium-range AAM and the AIM-9 Sidewinder, serving as the primary short-range or "dogfight" AAM. The combination of Phoenix missile and the Tomcat's AN/AWG-9 guidance radar meant that it was the first aerial weapons system that could simultaneously engage multiple targets. Due to its active radar tracking, the brevity code "Fox Three" was used when firing the AIM-54. The act of the missile achieving a radar lock with its own radar is known under brevity as "Going Pitbull".

Both the missile and the aircraft were used by Iran and the United States Navy (USN). In US service both are now retired, the AIM-54 Phoenix in 2004 and the F-14 in 2006. They were replaced by the shorter-range AIM-120 AMRAAM, employed on the F/A-18 Hornet and F/A-18E/F Super Hornet; in its AIM-120D version, the latest version of the AMRAAM just matches the Phoenix's maximum range. In July 2024, the USN announced the operational fielding of the AIM-174, the "Air-Launched Configuration" of the RIM-174 Standard ERAM, the first dedicated long-range AAM to be fielded by the U.S. military since the AIM-54's retirement.

The AIM-54 has been used in 62 air-to-air kills, all by Iran during the eight-year Iran–Iraq War. Following the retirement of the F-14 by the USN, the weapon's only current operator is the Islamic Republic of Iran Air Force.

== Development ==
=== Background ===
Since 1951, the Navy faced the initial threat from the Tupolev Tu-4K "Bull" carrying anti-ship missiles or nuclear bombs.

Eventually, during the height of the Cold War, the threat would have expanded into regimental-size raids of Tu-16 "Badger" and Tu-22M "Backfire" bombers equipped with low-flying, long-range, high-speed, nuclear-armed cruise missiles and considerable electronic countermeasures (ECM) of various types. This combination was considered capable of saturating fleet defenses and threatening carrier groups.

The Navy would require a long-range, long-endurance interceptor aircraft to defend carrier battle groups against this threat. The proposed Douglas F6D Missileer was intended to fulfill this mission and oppose the attack as far as possible from the fleet it was defending. The weapon needed for interceptor aircraft, the Bendix AAM-N-10 Eagle, was to be an air-to-air missile of unprecedented range when compared to contemporary AIM-7 Sparrow missiles. It would work together with Westinghouse AN/APQ-81 radar. The Missileer project was cancelled in December 1960.

=== AIM-54 ===
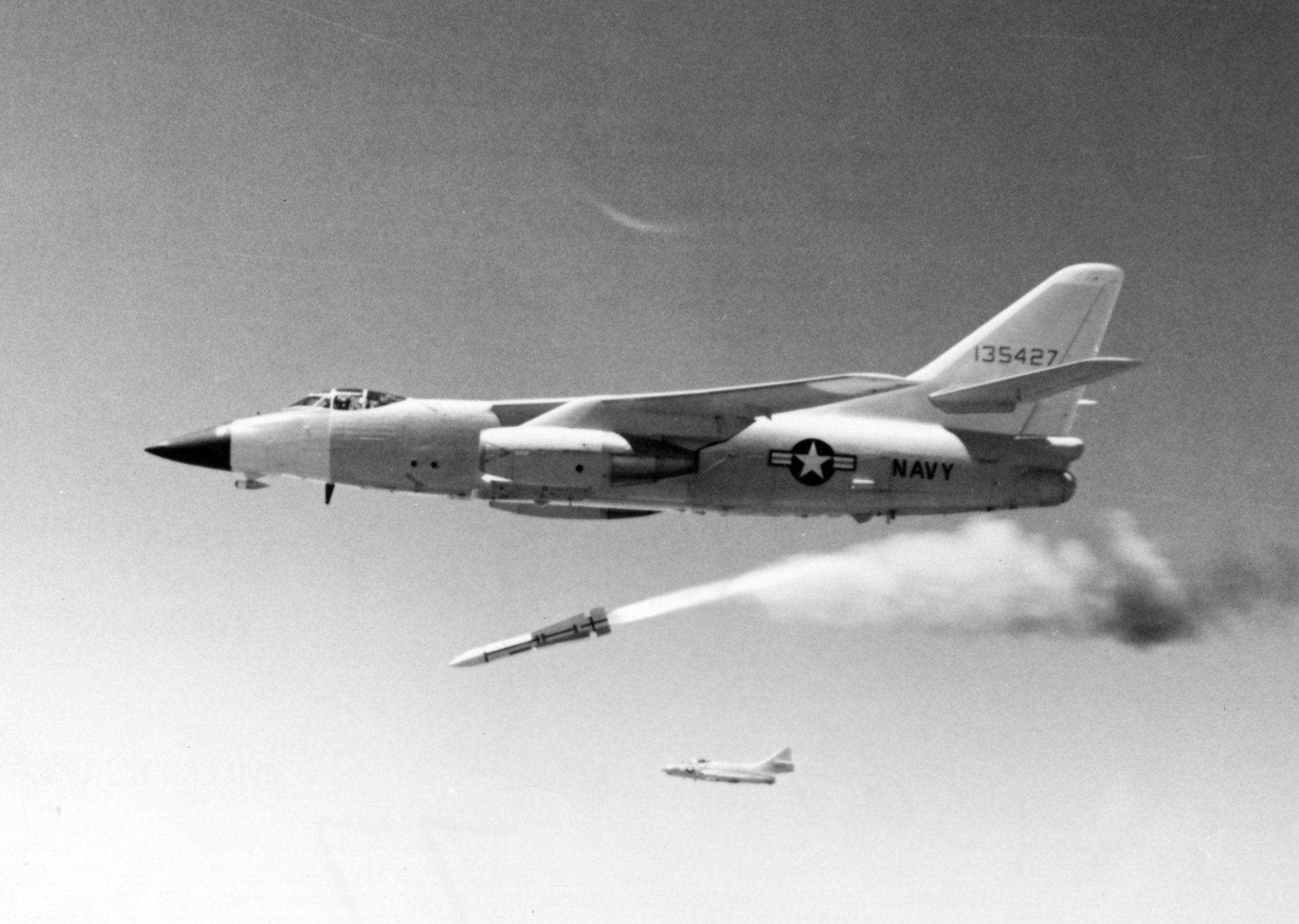
An AIM-54A launched from the NA-3A-testbed in 1966

In the early 1960s, the U.S. Navy made the next interceptor attempt with the F-111B, and they needed a new missile design. At the same time, the USAF canceled the projects for their land-based high-speed interceptor aircraft, the North American XF-108 Rapier and the Lockheed YF-12, and left the capable AIM-47 Falcon missile at a quite advanced stage of development, but with no effective launch platform.

Originally designated AAM-N-11, the AIM-54 Phoenix, developed for the F-111B fleet air defense fighter, had an airframe with four cruciform fins that was a scaled-up version of the AIM-47. One characteristic of the Missileer ancestry was that the radar sent it mid-course corrections, which allowed the fire control system to "loft" the missile up over the target into thinner air where it had better range.

The computer hardware to be embedded in the Phoenix was developed by Litton Industries, while Hughes engineers wrote the software on an IBM 7094 mainframe computer in 1964, then, after testing, downloaded it into the prototype missile's computer. The F-111B was canceled in 1968. The AIM-54, paired with the AWG-9 radar, migrated to the new U.S. Navy fighter project, the VFX, which would later become the F-14 Tomcat.

The AIM-54 Phoenix was also considered by the Royal Air Force to be used on Avro Vulcan bomber planes as part of an air defence aircraft. This missileer conversion would have used 12 missiles onboard and an extensive modification to the Vulcan's radar.

In 1977, development of a significantly improved Phoenix version, the AIM-54C, was developed to better counter projected threats from tactical anti-naval aircraft and cruise missiles, and its final upgrade included a re-programmable memory capability to keep pace with emerging ECM.

== Usage in comparison to other weapon systems ==
The AIM-54/AWG-9 combination had multiple track (up to 24 targets) and multiple launch (up to six Phoenixes can be launched nearly simultaneously) capability, regardless of weather conditions or heavy enemy electronic warfare, known as jamming. The large 1,000 lb (500 kg) missile is equipped with a conventional warhead.

The AIM-54 is designed for ejection launch, where a pyrotechnic charge forcefully jettisons it from either a LAU-93 or a LAU-132 launcher before its solid propellant rocket motor ignites.

External videos
- Rare declassified footage of the AIM-54 development program)

On the F-14, four missiles can be carried under the fuselage tunnel attached to special aerodynamic pallets, plus two under glove stations. A full load of six Phoenix missiles and the unique launch rails weighs in at over 8,000 lb (3,600 kg), about twice the weight of Sparrows, putting it above the allowable bringback load (which also would include enough fuel for go-around attempts). As such, carrying six Phoenix missiles would necessitate the jettison of at least some of the Phoenix missiles if they were not used. The most common air superiority payload was a mix of two Phoenix, three Sparrow, and two Sidewinder missiles.

Most other US aircraft relied on the smaller, semi-active medium-range AIM-7 Sparrow. Semi-active guidance meant the aircraft no longer had a search capability while supporting the launched Sparrow, reducing situational awareness.

The Tomcat's radar could track up to 24 targets in track-while-scan mode, with the AWG-9 selecting up to six potential targets for the missiles. The pilot or radar intercept officer (RIO) could then launch the Phoenix missiles once parameters were met. The large tactical information display (TID) in the RIO's cockpit gave information to the aircrew (the pilot had the ability to monitor the RIO's display) and the radar could continually search and track multiple targets after Phoenix missiles were launched, thereby maintaining situational awareness of the battlespace.

The Link 4 datalink allowed US Navy Tomcats to share information with the E-2C Hawkeye AEW aircraft. During Desert Shield in 1990, the Link 4A was introduced; this allowed the Tomcats to have a fighter-to-fighter datalink capability, further enhancing overall situational awareness. The F-14D entered service with JTIDS that brought the even better Link 16 datalink "picture" to the cockpit.

=== Active guidance ===
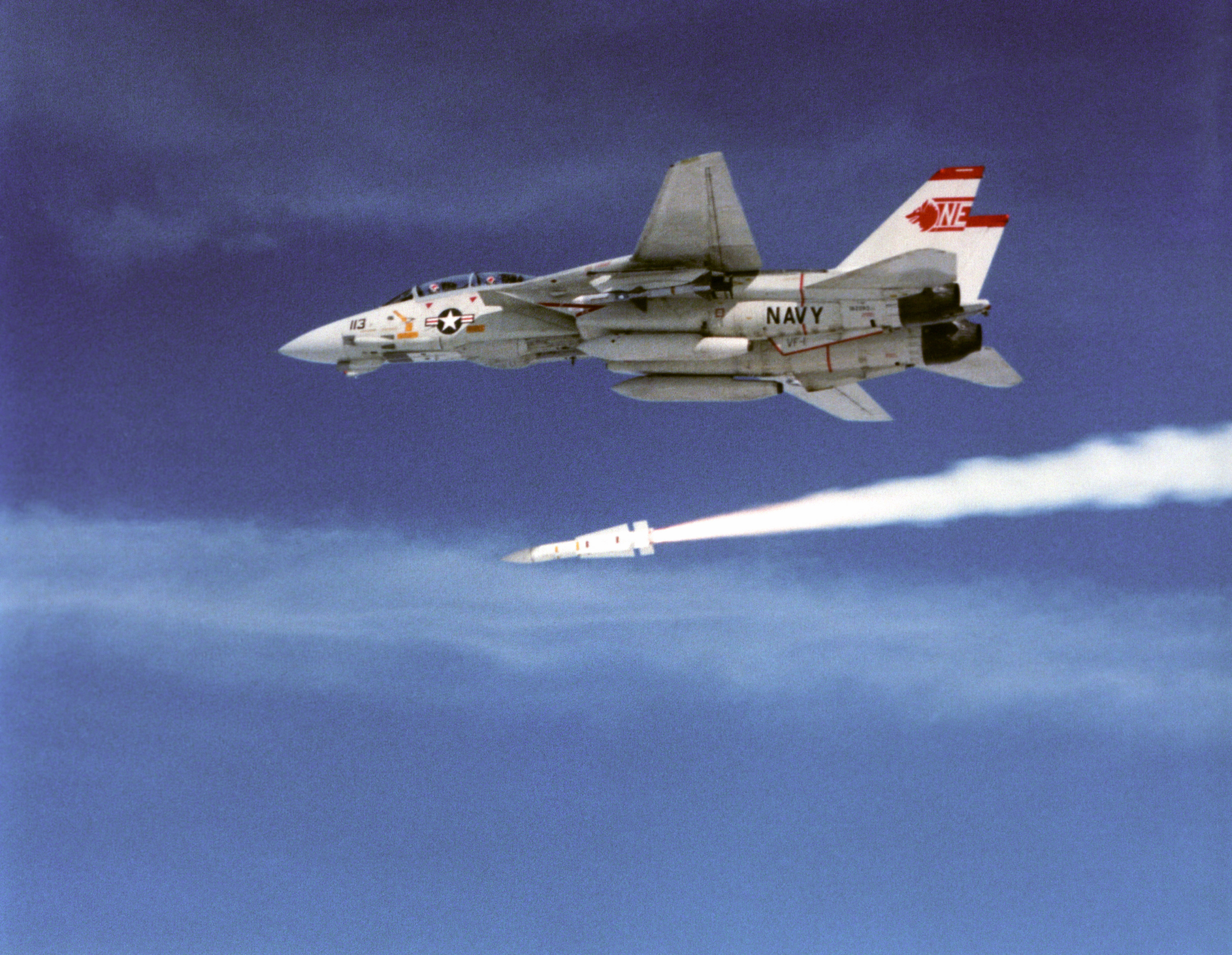
AIM-54 Phoenix seconds after launch (1989)

The Phoenix has several guidance modes and achieves its longest range by using mid-course updates from the F-14A/B AWG-9 radar (APG-71 radar in the F-14D) as it climbs to cruise between 80,000 ft (24,000 m) and 100,000 ft (30,000 m) at close to Mach 5. The Phoenix uses this high altitude to maximize its range by reducing atmospheric drag. At around 11 miles (18 km) from the target, the missile activates its own radar to provide terminal guidance. Minimum engagement range for the Phoenix is around 2 nmi (3.7 km); at this range active homing would initiate upon launch. If the AWG-9 radar lost radar lock on a target before the missile had activated its own radar, the missile proceeded on a ballistic trajectory with no further guidance, known as 'going dumb'.

== Service history ==
=== U.S. combat experience ===
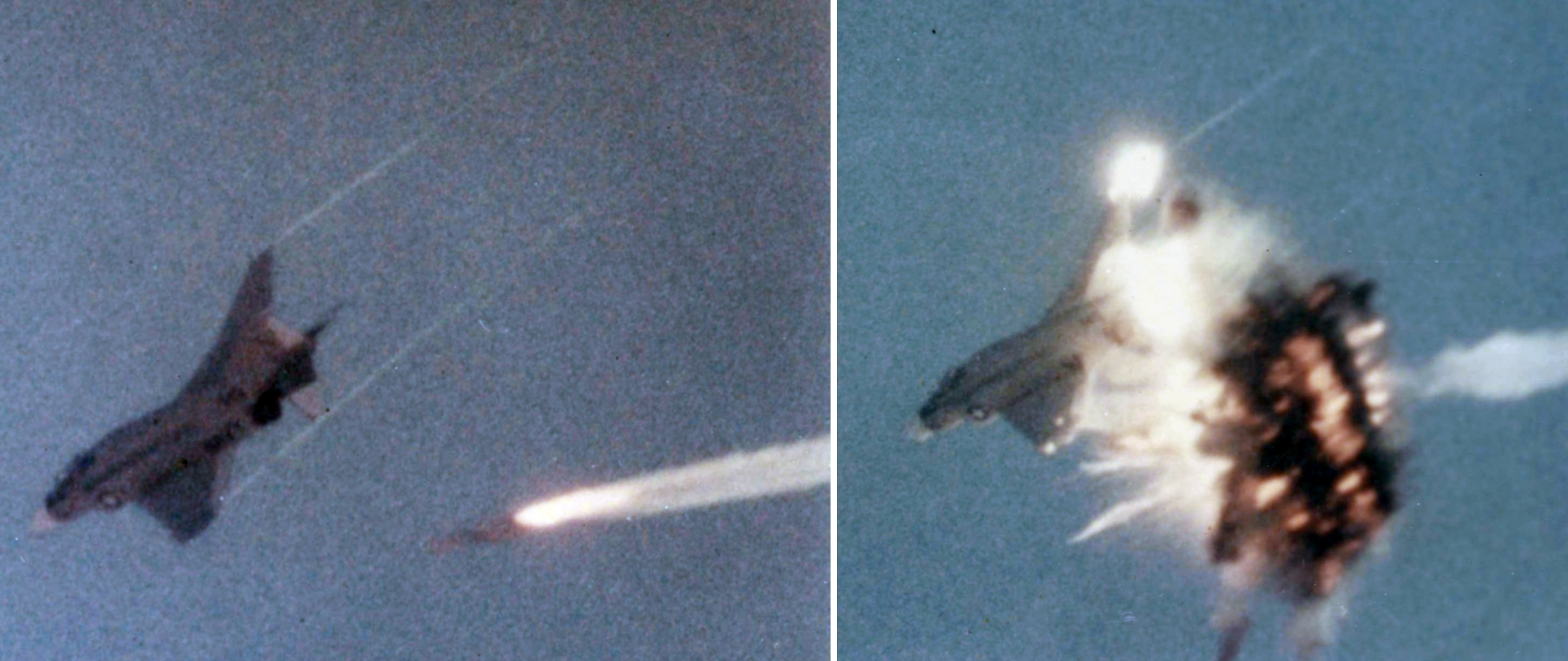
An AIM-54 hitting a QF-4B target drone, 1983

- On January 5, 1999, a pair of US F-14s fired two Phoenixes at Iraqi MiG-25s southeast of Baghdad. Both AIM-54s' rocket motors failed and neither missile hit its target.
- On September 9, 1999, another US F-14 launched an AIM-54 at an Iraqi MiG-23 that was heading south into the no-fly zone from Al Taqaddum air base west of Baghdad. The missile missed, eventually going into the ground after the Iraqi fighter reversed course and fled north.

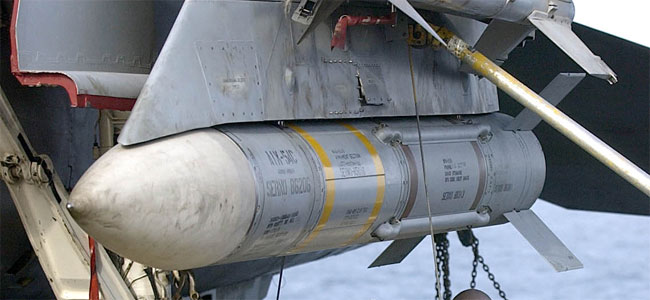
An AIM-54 Phoenix being attached to an F-14 wing pylon before the forward fins were installed (2003)

The AIM-54 Phoenix was retired from USN service on September 30, 2004. F-14 Tomcats were retired on September 22, 2006. They were replaced by shorter-range AIM-120 AMRAAMs, employed on the F/A-18E/F Super Hornet.

Despite the much-vaunted capabilities, the Phoenix was rarely used in combat, with only two confirmed launches and no confirmed targets destroyed in US Navy service. The USAF F-15 Eagle had responsibility for overland combat air patrol duties in Operation Desert Storm in 1991, primarily because of the onboard F-15 IFF capabilities. The Tomcat did not have the requisite IFF capability mandated by the Joint Force Air Component Commander (JFACC) to satisfy the rules of engagement to utilize the Phoenix capability at beyond visual range. The AIM-54 was not adopted by any foreign nation besides Iran, or any other US armed service, and was not used on any aircraft other than the F-14.

=== Iranian combat experience ===
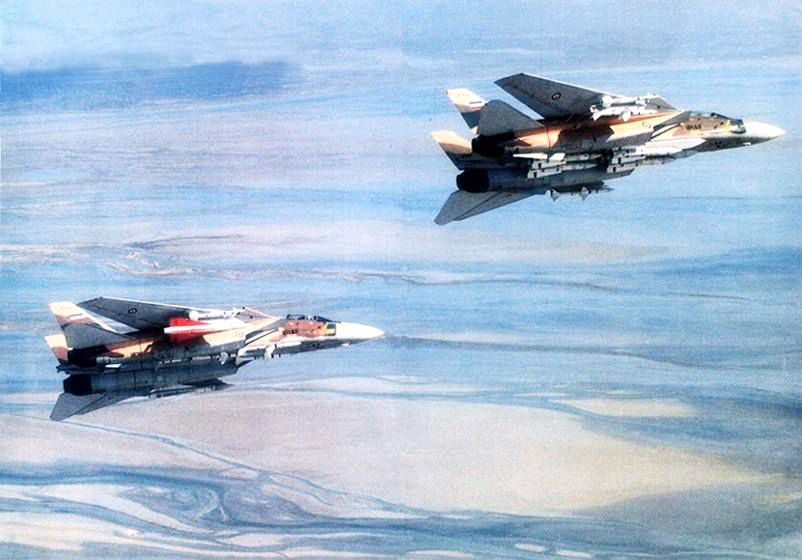
Iranian F-14 Tomcats armed with multiple types of air-to-air missiles, including AIM-54 Phoenixes, in 1986

On January 7, 1974, as part of Project Persian King, the Imperial Iranian Air Force placed an order for 424 AIM-54As, later increasing it by 290 missiles that June. Of the initial order, 274 missiles and 10 training rounds were delivered for US$150 million, until the 1979 Revolution ended deliveries and left the remaining 150 missiles embargoed and the additional order of 290 cancelled.

According to Tom Cooper and Farzad Bishop, during the Iran–Iraq War AIM-54s fired by IRIAF Tomcats achieved 78 victories against Iraqi MiG-21s, MiG-23s, MiG-25s, Tu-22s, Su-20/22s, Mirage F1s, Super Étendards, and even two AM-39 Exocets and a C-601. This includes two occasions where one AIM-54 was responsible for the downing of two Iraqi aircraft, as well as an incident on January 7, 1981, where a Phoenix fired at a four-ship of MiG-23BNs downed three and damaged the fourth.

The US refused to supply spare parts and maintenance after the 1979 Revolution, except for a brief period during the Iran–Contra affair. According to Cooper, the Islamic Republic of Iran Air Force kept its F-14 fighters and AIM-54 missiles in regular use during the entire Iran–Iraq War, though periodic lack of spares grounded large parts of the fleet at times. During late 1987, the stock of AIM-54 missiles was at its lowest, with fewer than 50 operational missiles available. The missiles needed fresh thermal batteries that could only be purchased from the US. Iran found a clandestine buyer that supplied it with batteries, which cost up to US$10,000 each. Iran received spares and parts for both the F-14s and AIM-54s from various sources during the Iran–Iraq War, and has received more spares after the conflict. Iran started a program to build spares for the planes and missiles, and although there are claims that it no longer relies on outside sources to keep its F-14s and AIM-54s operational, there is evidence that Iran continues to procure parts clandestinely.

Both the F-14 Tomcat and the AIM-54 Phoenix missile continue in the service of the Islamic Republic of Iran Air Force. In 2013, Iran unveiled the Fakour-90, a missile that is thought to be developed from the Phoenix and the MIM-23 Hawk surface-to-air missile.

== Variants ==
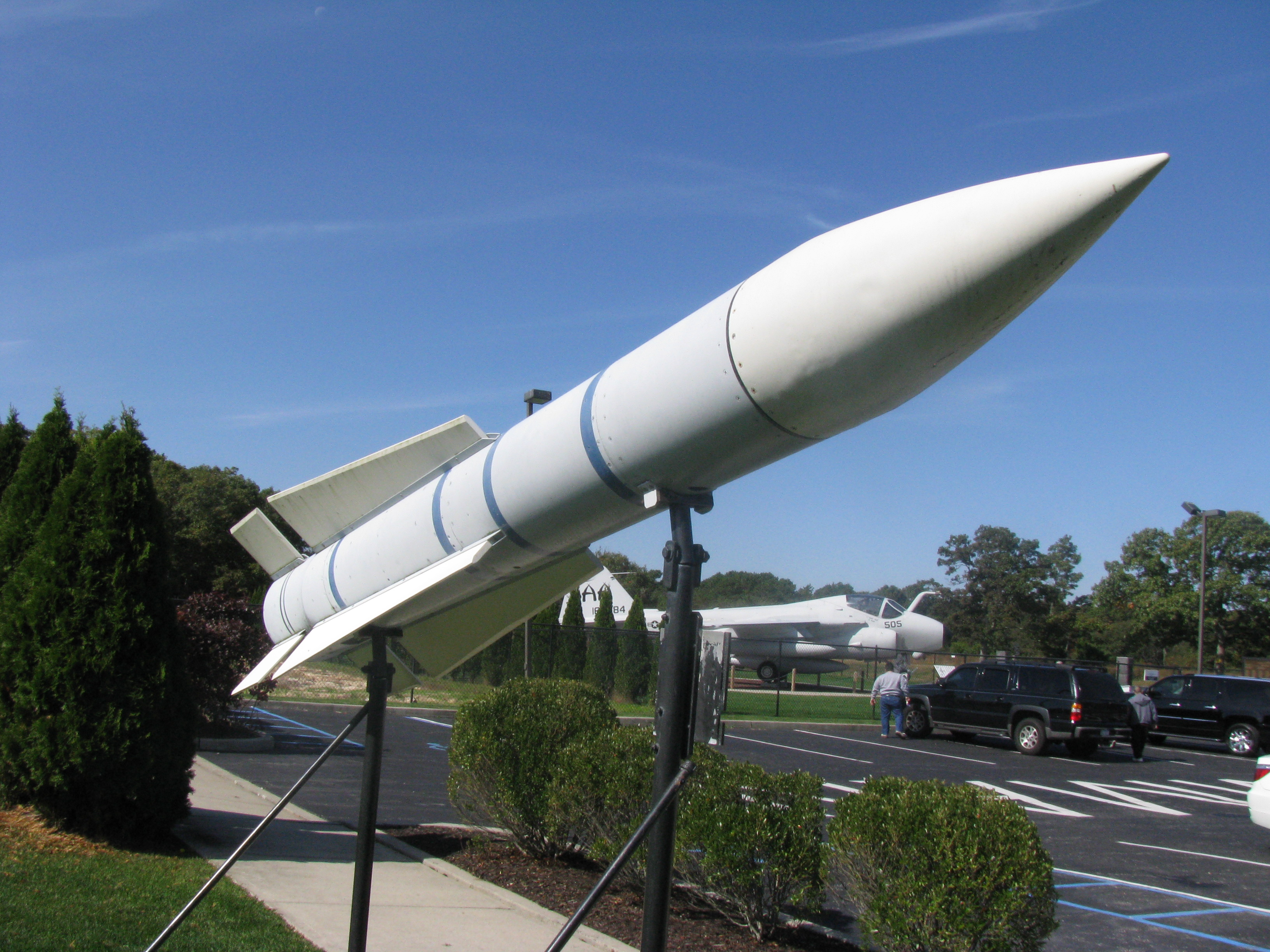
An AIM-54A "Phoenix" missile on display at Grumman Memorial Park in New York State

AIM-54A
Original model that became operational with the U.S. Navy in about 1974, and it was also exported to Iran before the Iran hostage crisis beginning in 1979.
AIM-54B
Also known as the 'Dry' missile. A version with simplified construction and no coolant conditioning. Did not enter series production. Developmental work started in January 1972. 7 X-AIM-54B missiles were created for testing, 6 of them by modifying pilot production IVE/PIP rounds. After two successful test firings, the 'Dry' missile effort was cancelled for being "not cost effective".
AIM-54C
The only improved model that was ever produced. It used digital electronics in the place of the analog electronics of the AIM-54A. This model had better abilities to shoot down low and high-altitude anti-ship missiles. It was designed for greater service life, reliability, and utilized fewer parts. It also included a built in self-test (BIST/BIT) and missile on-aircraft test capability. This model took over from the AIM-54A beginning in 1986.
AIM-54 ECCM/Sealed
More capabilities in electronic counter-countermeasures. It did not require coolant during flight. The missile was deployed from 1988 onwards. Because the AIM-54 ECCM/Sealed received no coolant, F-14s carrying this version of the missile could not exceed a specified airspeed. There were also test, evaluation, ground training, and captive air training versions of the missile; designated ATM-54, AEM-54, DATM-54A, and CATM-54, respectively. The flight versions had A and C versions. The DATM-54 was not made in a C version as there was no change in the ground handling characteristics. A small number of AIM-54As were also converted to NAIM-54As, carrying scientific recording equipment; their use is unknown.

Sea Phoenix
A 1970s proposal for a ship-launched version of the Phoenix as an alternative/replacement for the Sea Sparrow point defense system. It would also have provided a medium-range SAM capability for smaller and/or non-Aegis equipped vessels (such as the CVV, an abortive proposal for a "medium"-size, conventionally-powered aircraft carrier). The Sea Phoenix system would have included a modified shipborne version of the AN/AWG-9 radar. Hughes Aircraft touted the fact that 27 out of 29 major elements of the standard (airborne) AN/AWG-9 could be used in the shipborne version with little modification. Each system would have consisted of one AWG-9 radar, with associated controls and displays, and a fixed 12-cell launcher for the Phoenix missiles. In the case of an aircraft carrier, for example, at least three systems would have been fitted in order to give overlapping coverage throughout the full 360°. The AWG‑9’s track‑while‑scan capability could monitor up to 24 targets simultaneously; however, on the Tomcat, engagements were limited to 6 targets per launching aircraft, as this was the maximum number of Phoenixes a single Tomcat could carry. With the potential for greater "magazine depth" abord ships, the Sea Phoenix would be possibly capable of engaging up to 24 targets simultaneously per AN/AWG-9 system. Trials included a China Lake surface‑launch in which a standard AIM-54A traveled about 13.5 miles in 90 seconds to evaluate launcher separation and safety, and the 14th production AWG‑9 was installed aboard USNS Wheeling in 1974 where it successfully detected and tracked multiple high‑ and low‑altitude targets from the ship’s deck; unconfirmed reports also describe a "containerised" AWG‑9 trial at Point Mugu as a possible land‑based mobile testbed. Land-based testing may have been in-preparation of a United States Marine Corps weapon system utilizing the AIM-54 as a surface-to-air missile. Development of the land- and sea-based versions did not proceed largely because of high cost and the reduced range and performance penalty of surface launch relative to airborne launch. The AN/AWG‑9’s limited ability to track low‑altitude targets when ship‑mounted was also noted in tests. Redundancy was also noted, with contemporary fleet defense being provided predominantly by F-14s, themselves already equipped with the AWG‑9/AIM‑54 suite. Concerns also arose regarding the AIM-54's inability to function as a close-in system, its missiles lacking maneuverability against targets in the short range, particularly when compared to the smaller Sea Sparrow. With the emergence of the Aegis Combat System and upgraded Sea Sparrow variants becoming operational, any further development of the Sea Phoenix was halted. In 1977, Wayne E. Meyer, a U.S. Navy rear admiral, testified before Congress regarding these shortcomings and advised that testing found the Sea Phoenix to be "not favorable" and that it offered "no advantages" over Aegis and Sea Sparrow systems.

Fakour 90
In February 2013 Iran reportedly tested an indigenous long-range air-to-air missile. In September 2013 it displayed the Fakour-90 on a military parade. It looked almost identical to the AIM-54 Phoenix. In July 2018 as reported by Jane's, Iran started mass production of the Fakour-90.

== Operators ==
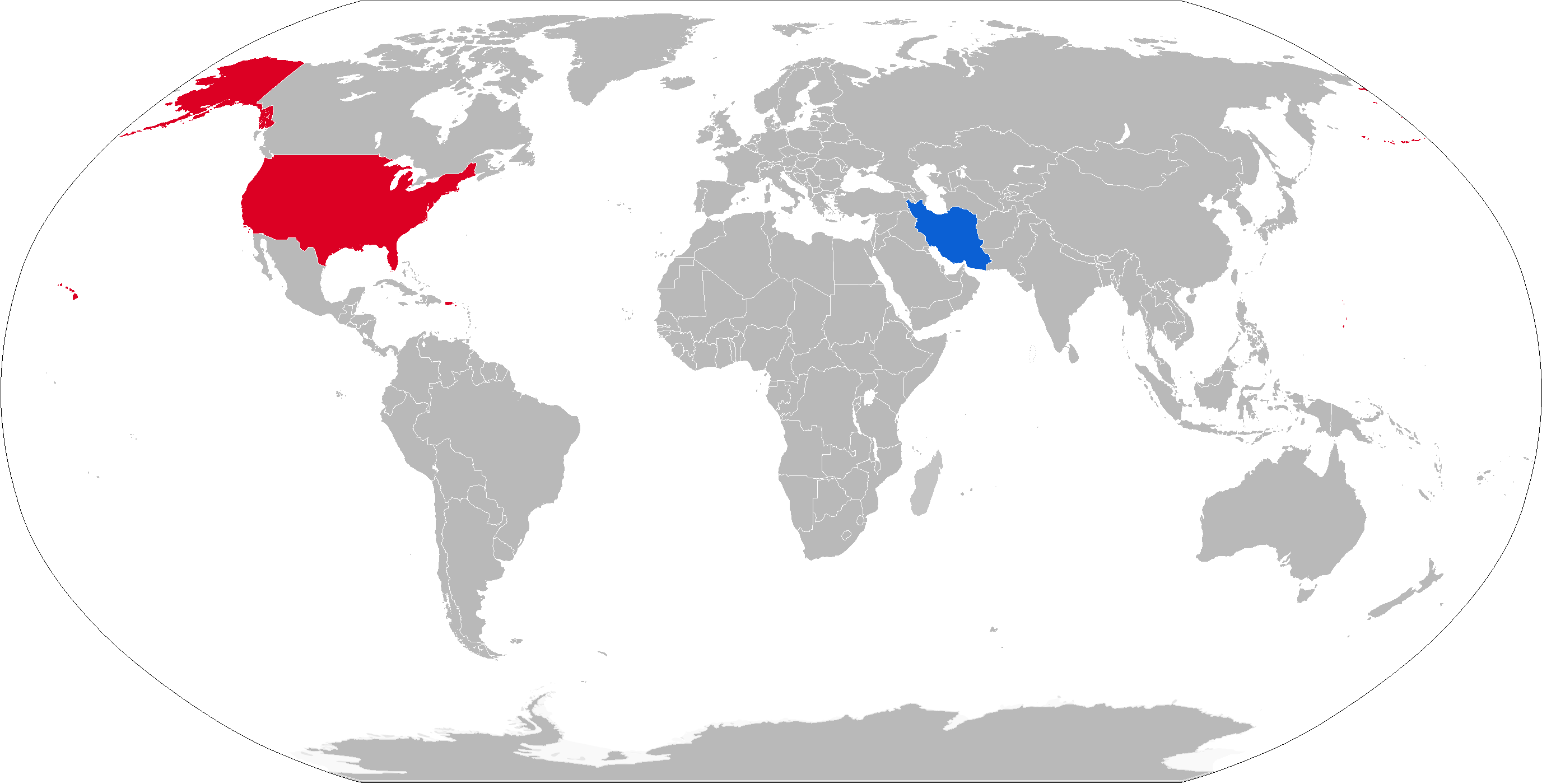
Map with current AIM-54 Phoenix operators in blue and former operators in red

=== Former operators ===
- Iran – Islamic Republic of Iran Air Force: Retired in 2012 , relapsed by Fakour-90.
- Imperial State of Iran - Imperial Iranian Air Force
- United States – United States Navy: Retired in 2004.

== Specifications ==
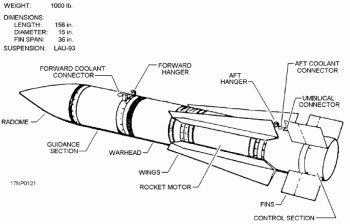
A technical drawing of AIM-54C

The following is a list of AIM-54 Phoenix specifications:

- Primary function: long-range, air-launched, air-intercept missile
- Contractor: Hughes Aircraft Company and Raytheon Corporation
- Unit cost: about $477,000, but this varied greatly
- Power plant: solid propellant rocket motor built by Hercules Incorporated
- Length: 13 ft (4.0 m)
- Weight: 1,000–1,040 pounds (450–470 kg)
- Diameter: 15 in (380 mm)
- Wing span: 3 ft (910 mm)
- Range: over 100 nautical miles (120 mi; 190 km) (actual range is classified)
- Speed: 3,000+ mph (4,680+ km/h)
- Guidance system: semi-active and active radar homing
- Warheads: proximity fuze, high explosive
- Warhead weight: 135 pounds (61 kg)
- Users: US (U.S. Navy), Iran (IRIAF)
- Date deployed: 1974
- Date retired (U.S.): September 30, 2004

== See also ==
- 1962 United States Tri-Service missile and drone designation system
- AIM-152 AAAM (Proposed successor.)
- F-14 Tomcat operational history
- Fakour-90, an Iranian look-alike of the AIM-54, but more similar to the MIM-23 Hawk internally
- FMRAAM
- Meteor (missile)
- R-33 (missile) (AA-9 Amos), the Russian air-to-air missile most similar to the AIM-54 Phoenix, and R-37 (missile)
- AIM-424 Malice
- AIM-174B Gunslinger
- Long-Range Engagement Weapon

Related lists

- List of military aircraft of the United States
- List of missiles
