= Alpha strike (United States Navy) =

United States Navy term for a large air attack launched from aircraft carrier

Alpha strike is a term used by the United States Navy to denote a large air attack by an aircraft carrier air wing, first coined during the Vietnam War. It is the Navy's version of the more widely used term "strike package."

An Alpha strike is typically a large strike representing a "deck load" of aircraft, i.e. the number of aircraft that can be brought to the flight deck, armed and launched against a high-value target. This will generally amount to about half of the aircraft aboard and will comprise aircraft from all squadrons on board and are also referred to as airwing-size strikes. The other half will normally have been recently recovered aircraft and will be parked and prepared for their next mission on the hangar deck below the flight deck. During an Alpha strike the carrier will remain into the wind and at General Quarters with a "ready deck" to recover any aircraft returning to the ship with battle damage. During the Vietnam War an Alpha strike also meant the target of a strike was specifically taken from a target list maintained by the Joint Chiefs of Staff and as such required JCS authorization.

The alternate form of carrier operations are "cyclic operations" during which a carrier will launch and recover aircraft (a launch and recovery is a complete cycle) on a prescribed schedule. Several factors will contribute to the length of a cycle depending on the type of aircraft, the time and distance to the target and the mission. With virtually all fast moving, jet aircraft aboard, carriers during the Vietnam War would launch and recover every 90 minutes and complete nine cycles daily over typically a 12- to 13-hour period. These carriers were generally assigned to Yankee Station located about 100 miles from the target area. When a carrier stood down after flight quarters another carrier would commence flight operations. Typically three and on rare occasions four carriers operated on Yankee Station and provided continuous fleet air operations around the clock. A carrier would typically be on the line for a "line period" of 30 to 35 days and then leave the line for six to eight days of rest and recreation. A deployment to the Western Pacific usually amounted to six line periods and typically lasted about 10 1/2 months including transit from and to the continental United States.

During the peak of the war a carrier typically launched 9,000 - 13,000 sorties. If a sortie may be used as a measure of activity, the periods from 1966 to early 1968 and 1970 to 1973 probably amounted to the most intensive level of combat flying in the history of naval warfare. Sometimes some very large air raids were staged by coordinating aircraft from three US Navy carriers in the Gulf of Tonkin and the US Air Force flying from airfields in Thailand. This could amount to 90 to 100 Navy aircraft and a similar number from the Air Force. During these very large raids either the Navy or the Air Force would strike first and the other service would re-strike the target 15 minutes later. The planning for these strikes was extensive, and typically a strike would remain over target no longer than two minutes in an effort to minimize losses in what was also the most intensive air defense system composed of fighters, anti-aircraft guns and missiles ever encountered.

== See also ==
- Index of aviation articles
