= Strike package =

Family of aircraft

A strike package is a group of aircraft with different capabilities that are launched together to perform a single attack mission. It is a combined arms effort in the air. The United States Navy calls the same concept "alpha strike".

The term is normally applied to ground attack missions, where the strike package for attacking the primary target will include bombers, fighters to defend them from enemy aircraft, wild weasels to defend against ground-based anti-aircraft weapons, reconnaissance aircraft for pre-raid and post-raid reconnaissance and tanker aircraft to extend the mission radius. AWACS and stand-off jamming aircraft may support the strike package without entering the most dangerous airspace. In some cases all of these roles can be carried out by a single aircraft type with different payloads, but it is more common to use a variety of different aircraft, launched from different locations and times.

Strike packages are a tactical adaptation to substantial threats (fighters, air defenses) and are less efficient than an all-strike fighter effort would be in face of little resistance. Often, only about 40% of the strike package aircraft are equipped to engage the primary ground targets. The strike package tactic gives up continuous air/ground operations over a target area in favor of discontinuous presence. This leaves periods of little air threat and thus relatively good freedom of movement to the opposing ground forces.

== See also ==
- Index of aviation articles
