= Timeline of the 2026 Iran war =

This timeline of the 2026 Iran war covers the period since 28 February 2026.

== February ==
=== 27 February ===
- United States ambassador to Israel Mike Huckabee emails embassy staff that if they want to leave, they should "do so TODAY".
- 20:38 UTC – US president Donald Trump gives the order to proceed with Operation Epic Fury.

=== 28 February ===
==== Israeli–US strikes ====
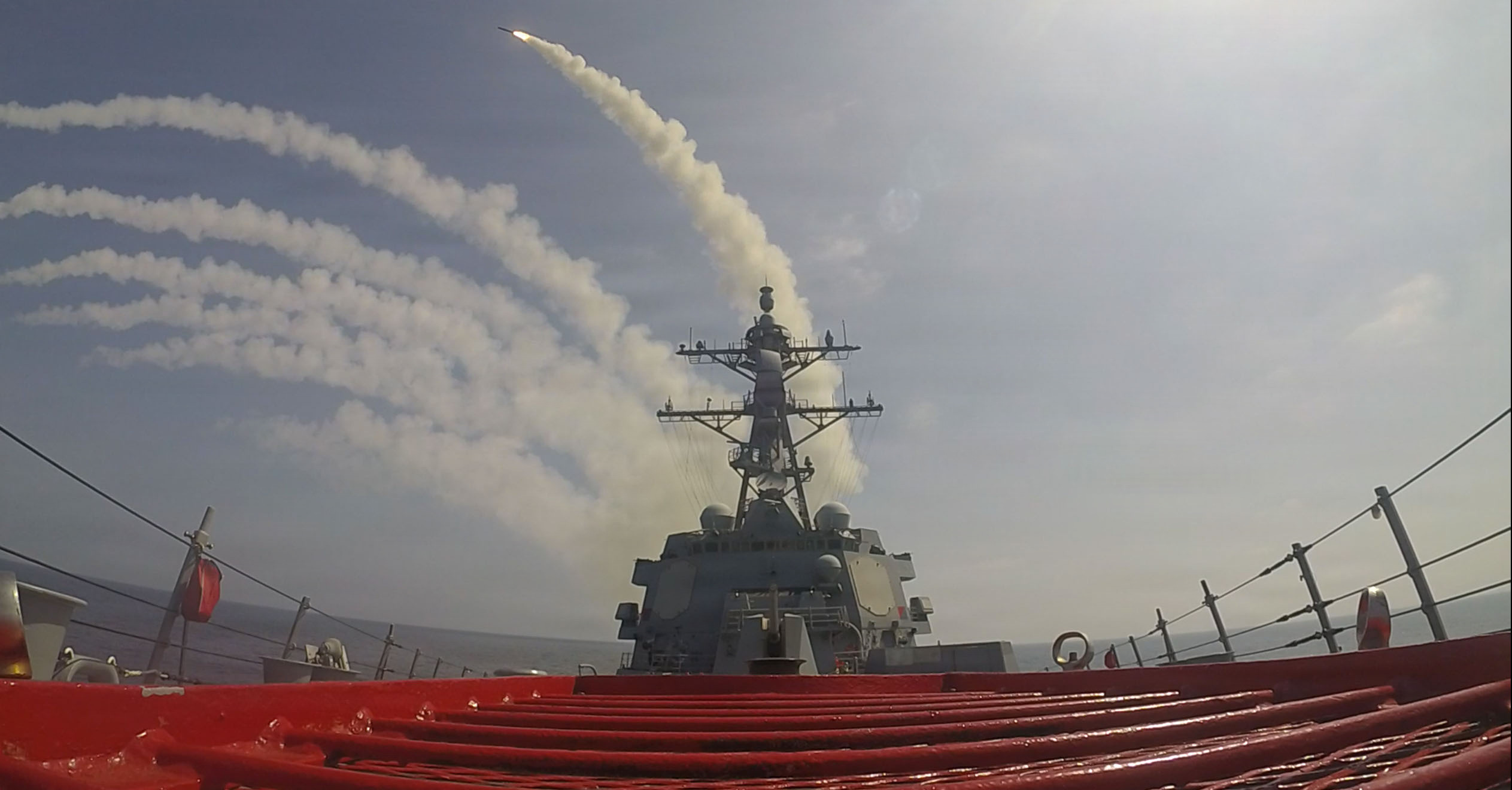
USS Frank E. Petersen Jr. fires a Tomahawk missile during Operation Epic Fury on 28 February 2026.

At 06:35 UTC, CENTCOM announced that it "and partner forces" had begun airstrikes against Iran. According to Business Insider, citing a US official, US warships launched Tomahawk missiles, the US Army used HIMARS launchers, and other undisclosed long-range standoff weapons were also used. The US military stated that it used B-2 stealth bombers, as well as B-1 Lancers and B-52 Stratofortresses, to strike fortified ballistic missile facilities inside Iran. At about 06:45 UTC, the Israeli Air Force conducted airstrikes that targeted senior Iranian officials. Analysts and news agencies, including Reuters and CNN, described the operation as a 'decapitation strike' or 'leadership-decapitation operation' aimed at the country's top leadership. Supreme Leader Ali Khamenei and several high officials (attending three meetings at his residential compound) were killed, as were members of his family. According to a statement issued by U.S. Central Command (CENTCOM), the targets of the strikes included Islamic Revolutionary Guard Corps command-and-control facilities, Iranian air defense systems, missile and drone launch sites, and military airfields.

The Fars News Agency and CNN reported more explosions across other cities in Iran, including Qom, Kermanshah, Isfahan, and Karaj. In Tehran, missile strikes were reported to have occurred on University Street, in the Jomhouri area, and in the northern Seyed Khandan area. At 07:15 UTC, The Shajareh Tayyebeh girls' elementary school in Minab, Iran, was struck by a missile. Iranian media reported 180 killed. A sports hall in Lamerd was bombed during a girls' practice, killing at least 18 civilians, according to witnesses and Iranian state media. The IRGC reported that the port city of Bushehr had also been struck; however, it was unclear whether the nuclear reactor had sustained any damage. Rafael Mariano Grossi, the UN nuclear watchdog chief stated that no evidence has been found that nuclear facilities have been hit from these attacks.

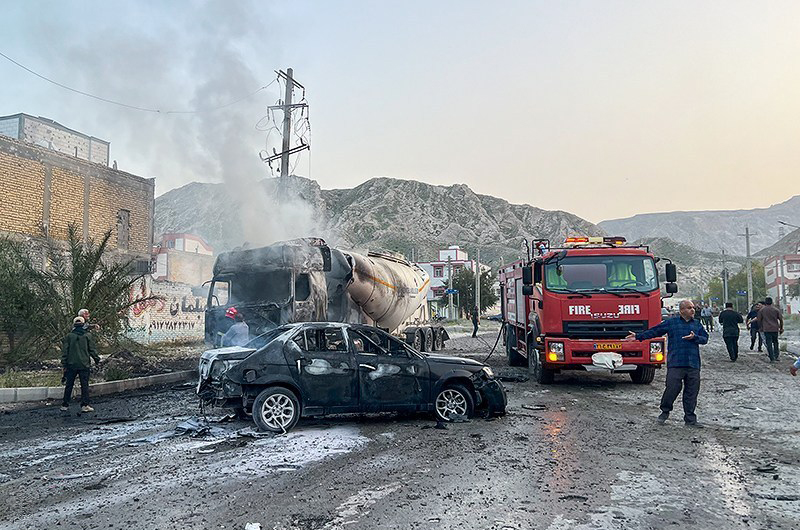
Damaged residential area in Lamerd, southwest Iran, after a reported missile attack targeting local infrastructure

Israel warned Iranian civilians residing near military industries and infrastructure to evacuate immediately, stating "Your presence in these areas puts your life at risk." According to U.S. Central Command, the operation marked the first combat use of low-cost one-way attack drones based on the Iranian Shahed 136 design. According to Israeli military sources, the attacks involved approximately 200 fighter jets—which they described as the largest combat sortie in Israel's history—and included the use of the newly developed Black Sparrow air-launched ballistic missile, fired from F-15s. A spokesperson for the Iraqi Popular Mobilization Forces says that two of its fighters had been killed while three more had been injured during strikes in Jurf al-Sakhar, south of Baghdad.

==== Iranian strikes ====
Beginning at 09:05 UTC, Iran launched ballistic missiles towards Israel and several Gulf states in retaliation to the American and Israeli strikes. At 09:26 UTC, a missile struck the USN Fifth Fleet service center in Bahrain. At 10:15 UTC, missile strikes were confirmed in Israel. The IDF estimated that about 170 ballistic missiles had been launched by Iran. Strikes were reported in Haifa and Tel Aviv. A strike on a residential area in Tel Aviv killed a civilian woman in her forties and injured 27 others.

The IRGC said that Iran had targeted four US bases in the Middle East: Al Udeid Air Base in Qatar; Ali Al Salem Air Base in Kuwait (which also hosted Italian soldiers); Al Dhafra Air Base in the UAE; and the US Navy Fifth Fleet headquarters in Bahrain.

Bahrain activated air-raid sirens to warn of an Iranian attack on US military bases within the nation, with Arabic media saying explosions and smoke were seen in the capital, Manama.

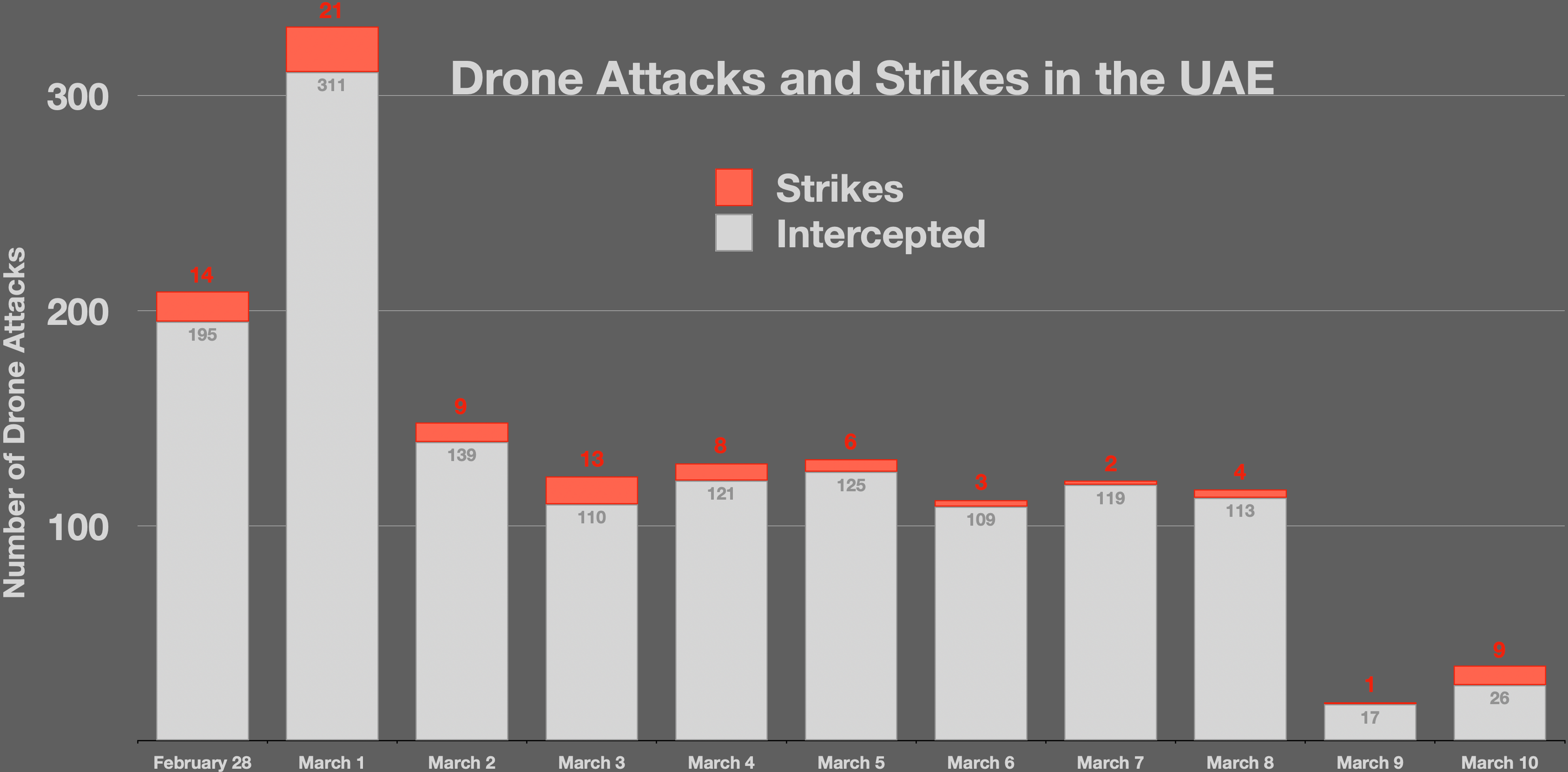
Drone attacks and strikes in the UAE

Explosions were reported at Kuwait International Airport and Abu Dhabi in the United Arab Emirates. There were missile and drone attacks on Kuwait. Saudi Arabia confirmed that there had been Iranian attacks on Riyadh and Eastern Province. It claimed to have successfully intercepted Iranian attacks aimed at those areas and said that the Kingdom will "take all necessary measures" to defend itself, "including the option of responding to aggression". Residential areas of Dubai in the proximity of the Burj Khalifa, Dubai Marina and the Dubai Palm were hit by strikes, setting the Fairmont The Palm hotel on fire and causing four injuries; a residential building on the outskirts of Doha was also hit. Local sources said Iran used Shahed drones, which are among the weapons most used by Iran and its proxies, including Hamas and Hezbollah. The UAE said that it had intercepted a "new wave" of Iranian missiles and that "fragments from the interceptions" had fallen in Abu Dhabi and Dubai, causing damage to Burj Al Arab. Strikes on Kuwait International Airport caused several undefined injuries. In Bahrain, during the evening a tower in a residential area was reported to be hit by an Iranian drone.

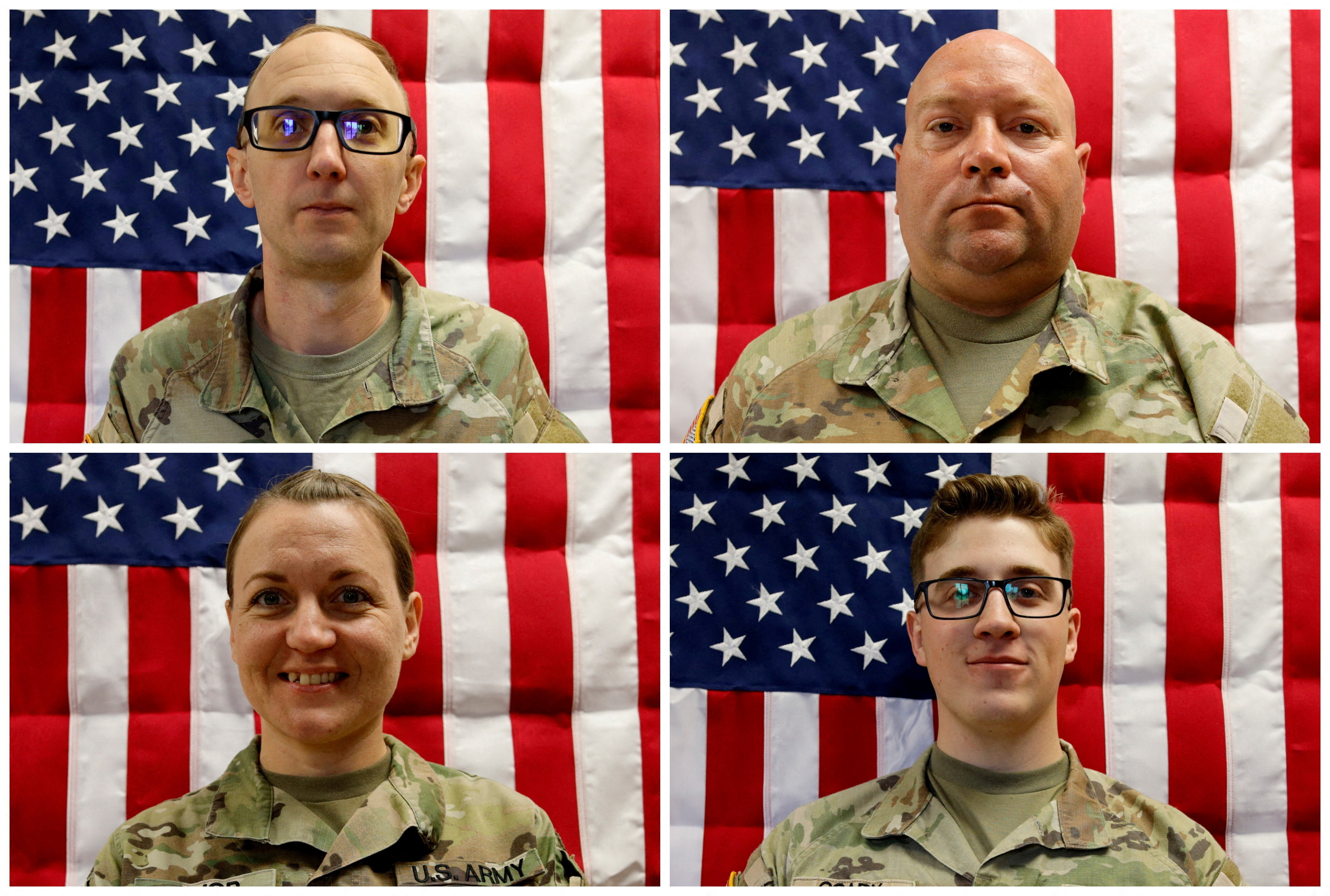
The first four US soldiers killed during the war

The UAE stated that it had successfully intercepted a number of Iranian missiles and that one Asian national had been killed by interceptor debris which had fallen on a residential area. Qatar says that it had intercepted at least two waves of missile attacks, stating that no casualties or property damage had been reported.

In the Kurdistan Region of Iraq, Iranian aerial attacks targeted infrastructure hosting US military and civilian personnel, including Erbil International Airport and the US Consulate General in Erbil. According to local media reports, most missiles and drones were intercepted.

Jordan said that its military had shot down two Iranian ballistic missiles targeting its territory and that it had handled 54 reports of falling debris that caused material damage but no casualties.

==== Other developments ====
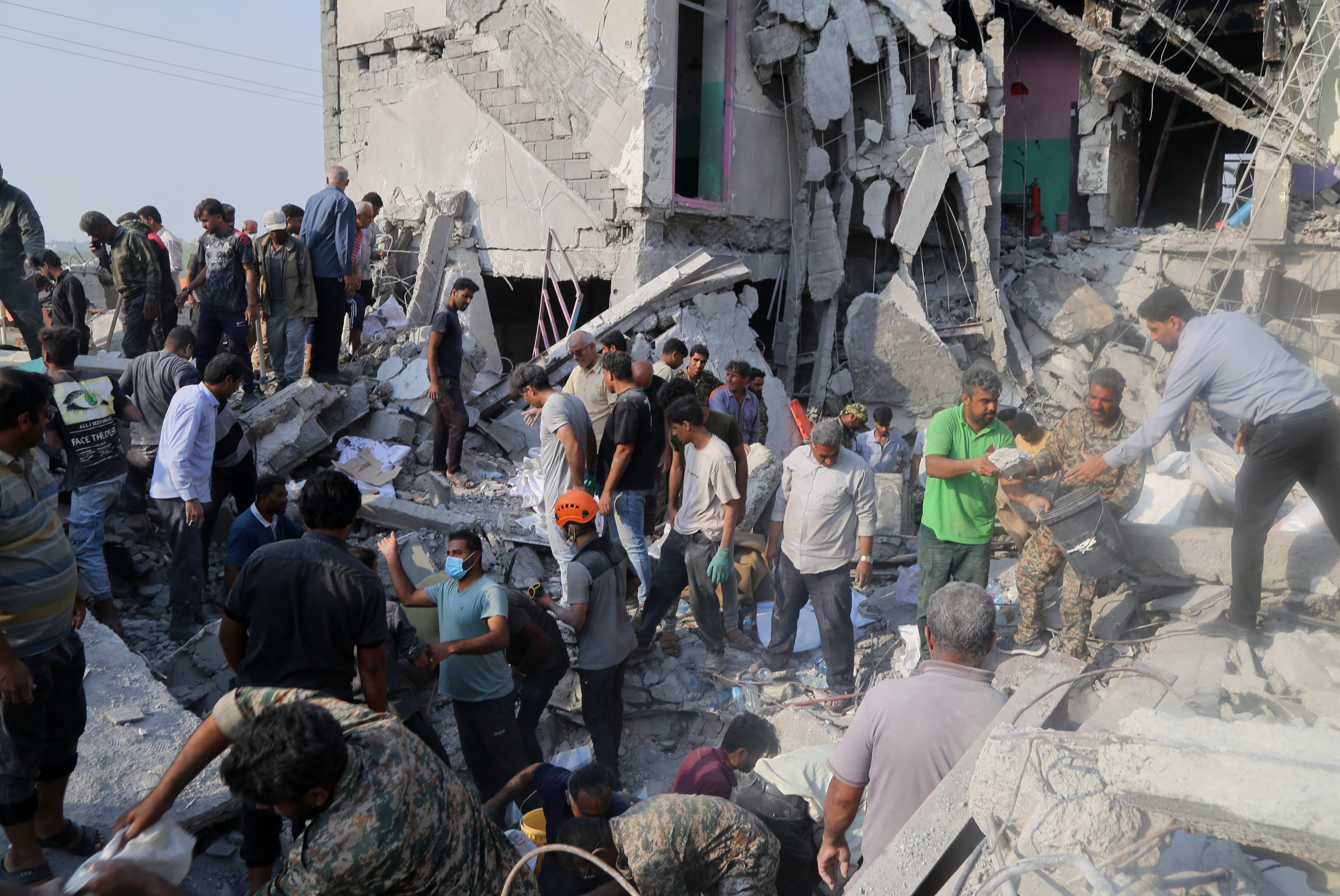
Rescuers and residents searching through the rubble of the Minab girls' elementary school, destroyed by the United States

Israel also conducted coordinated cyberattacks on Iranian infrastructure, media, and phone apps with messages calling on Iranians to rise up against their government. The popular BadeSaba Calendar prayer app, with over 5 million downloads, was compromised in the attack, being hacked early that morning to broadcast push notifications in Persian urging military personnel and citizens to defect, lay down weapons, and join opposition forces with messages such as "Help has arrived" and "It's time for reckoning."

Israel declared a state of emergency, citing expectation of an Iranian attack. Sirens blared in Israel as the government warned its citizens to remain in protected areas. The Israeli Ministry of Health moved its hospital operations underground. Israel called up 20,000 reservists in addition to the 50,000 already on duty.

After the missile and drone attacks on Kuwait, its foreign ministry summoned Mohammad Toutounchi, Iran's ambassador in Kuwait.

During the American-Israeli attacks on a primary school in Minab (Iran), 6 of the killed ones were gymnasts, including: Reza Habashi, Arina Arabkish, Atena Ahmadzadeh, Makan Nasiri, and Araz Ahmadizadeh.

== March ==
=== 1 March ===
==== US–Israeli attacks in Iran ====
HRANA reported 72 strikes in 20 provinces, and at least 6 civilians killed and 4 injured. Targets hit included 15 military or security bases and facilities, 7 pieces of civilian infrastructure, 5 hospitals and emergency bases and two residential/educational facilities. Israel executed another wave of strikes against Iran, aiming at central Tehran. The USAF flew B-2 bombers to attack hardened ballistic missile facilities with 2,000 pound bombs. USN F/A-18s and USMC F-35s, aided by Tomahawk missiles were also employed along with Lucas drones. CENTCOM declared that it was instructed to "dismantle the Iranian regime's security apparatus." CENTCOM declared that it was instructed to "dismantle the Iranian regime's security apparatus." Israel and the United States launched strikes against targets in Tehran, Sanandaj, and military and strategic locations including command centers and missile sites. The Israel Defense Forces says that it bombed an F-4 and an F-5 fighter jet preparing to take off from a runway, and the HQ-9B system around Tehran was inactivated. The Tehran Revolutionary Court was bombed and destroyed. Explosions are also reported near the Azadi Stadium, Azadi Square, and Milad Tower. The Iranian Red Crescent Society reported explosions near hospitals in Tehran, as well as near its Peace Building. The IDF declared that it had levelled Iran's internal security services' Thar-Allah Headquarters. Mohammad Baseri, an official in the ministry of intelligence, and Gholamreza Rezaian, the head of the intelligence department of FARAJA police, were both killed in strikes on Iran. At least 5 people were killed by strikes on residential areas in the Absardar region.

==== Iranian attacks ====
Iran launched retaliatory missile and drone strikes against Israel, UAE, Qatar, Kuwait, Bahrain, Jordan, and Saudi Arabia. Iran claimed to have shot down an American MQ-9 Reaper drone. The IRGC claimed that it struck USS Abraham Lincoln with four missiles, which was later denied by a US official. On 1 or 2 March, Iran struck the radar bases for US THAAD missile defense systems in Jordan, the UAE and Saudi Arabia, destroying at least one of them.

An Iranian missile breached Israeli defences and hit a synagogue and homes in Beit Shemesh, killing nine people and injuring 65. Towards the end of the day, an Iranian ballistic missile hit an area of Jerusalem, causing property damage in the surrounding road, damaging a civilian vehicle and wounding six people.

Missiles from Iran were fired at Fifth Fleet headquarters in Bahrain. An Iranian drone hit the Crowne Plaza Hotel in Manama, Bahrain, causing a fire. Witnesses saw smoke from missile intercepts over Dubai and dark plumes rising from the Port of Jebel Ali, United Arab Emirates. In Abu Dhabi a drone was intercepted near the Etihad Towers complex, near the Israeli embassy. Upon being intercepted its debris damaged the towers and caused minor injuries to a woman and her child. The French naval base Camp de la Paix was reportedly struck by Iran. Two Iranian drones targeted a warehouse at Al-Salam Naval Base causing a fire in two containers storing general materials. Around 02:30 UTC, an Amazon Web Services data center within the UAE was "impacted by objects that struck" it, resulting in "sparks and fire". Reuters reported that this resulted in a complete power cut and shutdown of the center with the involvement of local fire department crews, leading to a temporary connectivity outage of the availability zone impacted.

During drone operations in the Strait of Hormuz, the port of Duqm in Oman was reportedly hit by two drones, injuring one expatriate worker. Oman's Maritime Security Centre confirmed that an oil tanker which was Palau-flagged, named Skylight, had been targeted 5 nautical miles (9.3 km) north of the port of Khasab, causing four injuries amongst the Indian-Iranian crew present on the vessel. The Marshall Islands-flagged tanker MKD VYOM was damaged after being struck off the coast of Oman, killing one crew member. As a result of the conflict and higher risk to ships, 150 freight ships, including many oil tankers, stalled behind the strait.

Iranian attacks killed one person and injured 32 in Kuwait.

UK military officials said an RAF Typhoon shot down an Iranian drone bound for Qatari airspace. At about 22:00 UTC: a series of loud blasts were recorded in Doha, and continued to be heard hours later.

Riyadh was again hit by direct strikes. A Saudi oil refinery was closed after being targeted by Iranian drones. Around 15:30 UTC, Saudi Arabia claimed that it had shot down missiles fired at Prince Sultan Airbase and King Khalid International Airport.

An explosion occurred near the Erbil Airport after an attack by Iraqi militia drones. Debris from an unidentified missile fell in Ain Tarma, Syria, causing some damage and injuries.

Around 00:20 UTC, the Royal Air Force station at Akrotiri, Cyprus, was targeted by a suspected drone strike, setting off air raid sirens across Akrotiri and Dhekelia. Five drones are reportedly intercepted although one managed to hit the airfield, causing minor damage. The British military automated alert system stated that there was an "ongoing security threat", and the UK Ministry of Defence claimed that "the base has responded" to the attack. This was later confirmed by Cypriot authorities. The drones were launched before the UK allowed the US to use its military bases for operations against Iran. UK defence secretary John Healey said that he did not believe they were under attack. Defence Minister of Cyprus Vasilis Palmas denied that missiles were launched at Cyprus, and Prime Minister Keir Starmer affirmed this.

==== Other developments ====
Iran's top security official, Ali Larijani, announced a temporary leadership council after the death of Ali Khamenei. He warned "secessionist groups" of severe consequences if they take action.

Crown Prince Mohammed bin Salman of Saudi Arabia authorized military force against further Iranian incursions.

To avert further Iranian strikes, the E3 (the UK, France, and Germany) resolved to back, if needed, "proportionate military defensive measures" against drones and ballistic missiles. British prime minister Keir Starmer announces approval of US use of British bases for "defensive" strikes on Iran.

The EU announced the expansion of Operation Aspides in response to increased requests for protection from commercial vessels.

State media reported gatherings in Enqelab Square, in Tehran, Iran, on 1 March.

The spokesperson for the Iraqi prime minister condemned the assassination of Ali Khamenei and declared three days of mourning for him.

=== 2 March ===
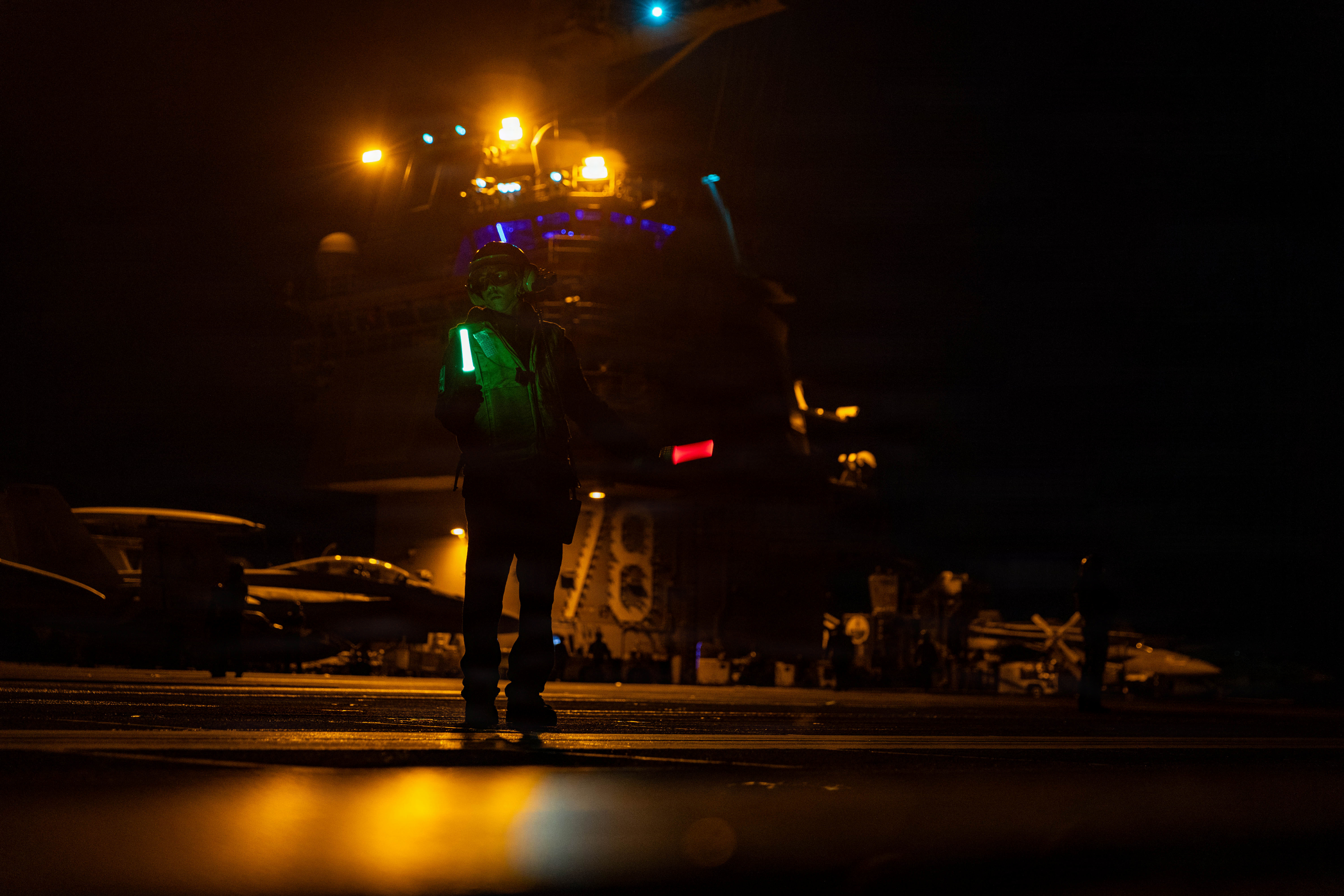
A US sailor signals a test for a catapult on the flight deck of the world's largest aircraft carrier, USS Gerald R. Ford, while operating in the Eastern Mediterranean Sea in support of Operation Epic Fury, 2 March 2026.

==== US–Israeli attacks in Iran ====
HRANA reported 56 strikes in 13 provinces, and at least 85 civilians killed, 5 civilians wounded and 11 military personnel killed. 579 casualties remained unclassified and under review. Targets hit included law enforcement and border guard command centers in Sanandaj, an airbase in Isfahan, an army base and residential buildings in Tehran, a mosque in Mehrshahr, the governor's office in Rey, and Shahid Bahonar Pier in Bandar Abbas.

The Iranian Red Crescent reported 555 people killed. Israel launched strikes on targets in Tehran and Sanandaj, hitting military and strategic locations including command centers and missile sites. Satellite images taken by Vantor on 1 and 2 March were made public, which showed that Iran's Natanz Nuclear Facility in Isfahan, Iran, had sustained damage. Subsequently, the International Atomic Energy Agency (IAEA) confirmed that satellite imagery showed that entrance buildings at Natanz were damaged, but no radiological consequence was expected and no additional impact had been detected at the fuel enrichment plant itself. The Khatam-al-Anbia and Gandhi hospitals in Tehran were hit by strikes. The USAF hit military aircraft and drone launchers, including multiple F-14 Tomcats at airbases across Iran. The IDF said that it hit dozens of command sites and other targets at night in Tehran, including ten belonging to the Ministry of Intelligence and one belonging to the Quds Force. Later attacks hit the Islamic Republic of Iran Broadcasting headquarters in Evin, Tehran. According to Al Arabiya, Israeli special forces and Mossad operatives carried out a ground operation inside Iran; no details of the operation were reported.

==== Iranian attacks ====
Iran launched more strikes against the Gulf States. Explosions were reported in Dubai, Abu Dhabi, and Doha. Smoke rose from the US embassy in Kuwait, which was subsequently closed indefinitely. According to Kuwait News Agency, an oil refinery was hit by shrapnel. Iran carried out attacks targeting energy infrastructure in Qatar. Iranian drones struck Qatar's liquefied natural gas (LNG) facilities, halting production. In addition, missiles and drones were launched at sites in Qatar, including the Al Udeid Air Base and industrial facilities. Qatari forces said they intercepted many of these. US-flagged tanker Stena Imperative was hit by projectiles off Bahrain, causing a fire that was extinguished. In Bahrain, sirens had sounded across the country. Falling debris from an intercepted missile on a "foreign ship" in Salman industrial zone resulted in the death of a worker and serious injuries to two others. An Iranian strike targeted Mina Salman port, causing a fire. UAE officials claimed to have downed 148 Iranian drones, nine ballistic missiles, and half a dozen cruise missiles.

A refining facility was damaged in Aramco's Ras Tanura in Saudi Arabia, causing a contained fire. It was initially believed to be caused by a drone attack, but Saudi officials stated it was debris from an intercepted Iranian missile, and Iran denied it had targeting the facility. All staff members at the US–Jordanian embassy were evacuated "due to a threat". Two drones targeted the US Victory Base near Baghdad International Airport, one of which reportedly struck the base. There were reports of explosions in Erbil, Kurdistan Region, Iraq. A pro-Iran group called the "Guardians of the Blood Brigade" stated they were behind these two attacks, and claimed they were in retaliation for Khamenei's assassination. The Islamic Resistance in Iraq claimed responsibility for over 23 drone strikes on US assets in Erbil.

In Cyprus, Paphos International Airport was evacuated upon the detection of a foreign unidentified object in the sky, and at the same time sirens sounded once again at Akrotiri base upon the detection of a possible threat. Later on the Cypriot government confirmed that the objects were two drones which were intercepted without causing any damages. After the incident, Greece announced that they would deploy frigates and F-16s to defend Cyprus from any further strikes by Iran. Later in the day IRGC general Sardar Jabbari commented that there was a US presence on the island of Cyprus and that Iran planned to strike the island "with such intensity that the Americans will be forced to leave".

The IRGC claimed a drone strike on the Honduras-flagged tanker Athe Nova in the Strait of Hormuz.

19 people were injured after an Iranian missile hit a neighborhood in Beersheba, Israel.

The US Central Command announced the death of six US service members killed in action.

==== Lebanon theater ====
Projectiles were launched from within Lebanon toward Israel in the early hours of 2 March, setting off sirens across Haifa and the Upper Galilee. The IDF said that it intercepted a rocket from Hezbollah, while others hit open areas. The IDF spokesperson issued an emergency statement saying that the attack is to be considered "an official declaration of war by Hezbollah", vowing to "neutralize" the threat. Hezbollah confirmed its responsibility, saying that it attacked an IDF base in Haifa in response to Khamenei's killing.

The IDF proceeded with a series of airstrikes in Beirut and the Beqaa Valley. Strikes also hit southern Lebanon. Israel warned Lebanese people who fled from their homes not to return. The IDF later announced that it struck more than 70 targets in Dahieh and southern Lebanon. The IDF struck three southern Lebanese towns, including Haris, Nabatieh al-Fawqa, and Mayfadoun, and later issued an evacuation order in 50 adjacent communities. The IDF said it killed the head of Hezbollah's intelligence headquarters Hussein Makled in the strikes. In the night, it reported the killing of Abu Hamza Rami, the Palestinian Islamic Jihad commander in Lebanon, in Beirut.

==== Other developments ====
Qatar shoots down two Iranian Su-24 bombers, making it the first nation to shoot down crewed Iranian aircraft in the conflict.

Three US F-15 fighters crash in Kuwait. Iran claims to have shot them down, while later CentCom attributed it to friendly fire by Kuwait.

=== 3 March ===
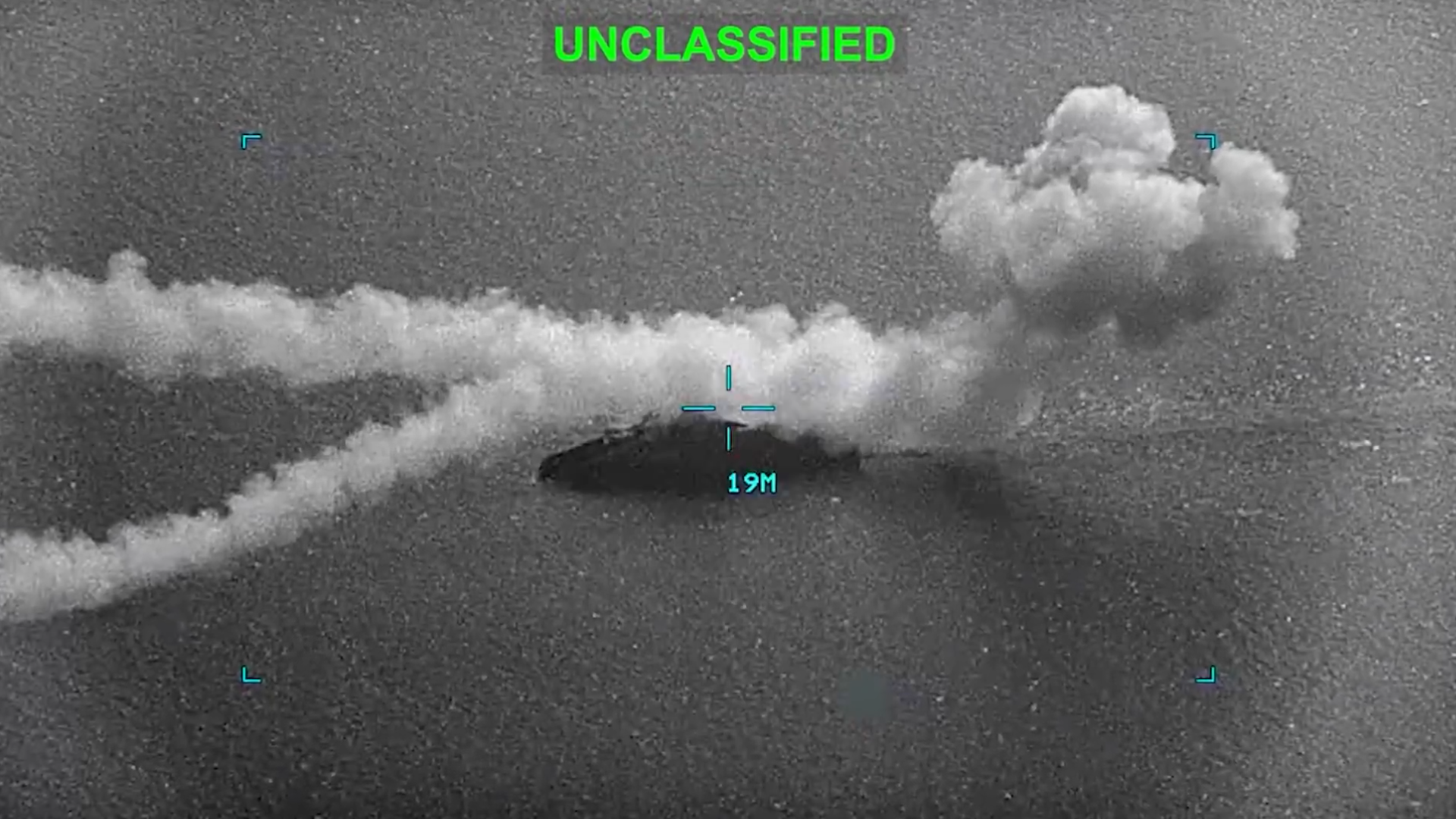
A photo of IRIS Shahid Soleimani after being struck by American forces during the 2026 Iran war

The war dramatically expanded, with nine countries now involved.

==== US–Israeli attacks in Iran ====
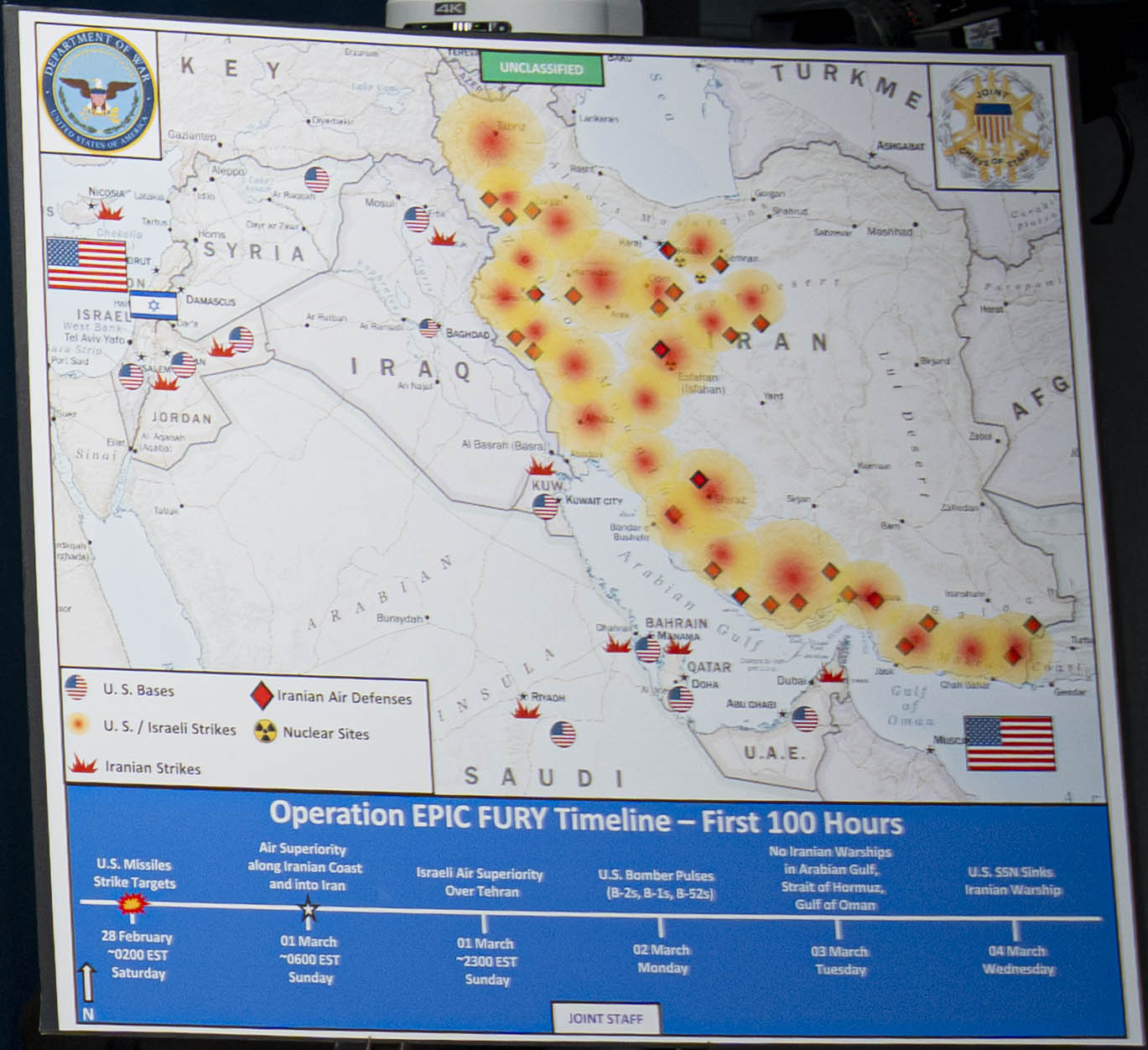
Map of "Operation Epic Fury Timeline - First 100 Hours" during press briefing at the Pentagon on 4 March 2026

HRANA reported 104 attacks in 19 provinces, and at least 31 casualties including 15 civilians killed and 1 injured. Isfahan, Kermanshah, Shiraz and IEI were bombed, along with other cities. Targets hit included Imam Hossein University and a garrison in Tehran, a military headquarters in Kermanshah, garrisons in Marivan and Najafabad, the Shohada Hospital in Sarpol-e Zahab, a field hospital in Salas-e Babajani, the Criminal Investigation Department in Marivan, nuclear facilities in Natanz and the Dezful Radio building in Dezful.

IRIB Tehran HQ was bombed second day in row and switched to Telewebion IP internet streaming TV. Old Mirdamad St., the historic imperial Senate of Iran and the current seat of the Assembly of Experts was bombed, as was the Expediency Discernment Council building. The IDF said that it destroyed a covert nuclear site, and killed one of the commanders of the IRGC, as well as the commander of the Quds Force's Lebanon branch, in Tehran. The IDF announced that it had destroyed the Supreme National Security Council (SNSC) headquarters, along with command-and-control infrastructure and the president's office, noting that it targeted "the regime's most central and significant headquarters". Golestan Palace, a UNESCO World Heritage Site, was hit by debris from an Israeli-US airstrike, causing some damage including to the Brilliant Hall and the Marble Throne. The Ministry of Cultural Heritage, Tourism and Handicrafts officially asked UNESCO to evaluate the situation, and UNESCO issued a statement, noting that damaging UNESCO property is against international laws. The Iranian Red Crescent Society raised the number killed to 787.

In southern Iran, Bushehr Airport was targeted in a precision strike that resulted in the total destruction of an Iran Air Airbus A319 (EP-IEP) parked on the tarmac. The Mehr News Agency reported significant structural damage to the airport terminal. The proximity of the strikes to the Bushehr Nuclear Power Plant (About 12 km (7.5 mi) away) prompted the Russian agency Rosatom to suspend construction on new units and evacuate non-essential staff due to a loss of communication with Iranian officials.

CENTCOM commander Admiral Brad Cooper said that the United States "destroyed 17 Iranian ships, including the most operational Iranian submarine that now has a hole in its side." The US sunk missile corvette IRIS Shahid Soleimani, the lead ship of an Iranian class with the same name. The US sunk the submarine IRIS Fateh, Iran's only operational Fateh-class submarine. It was the first submarine to be sunk during a conflict since the Falklands War.

==== Iranian attacks ====
Iran continued its strikes on Israel and the Gulf states.

The Israeli cities of Bnei Brak and Rosh HaAyin saw Iranian strikes causing a total of seven injuries amongst civilians. Israeli Police report that one person was injured after Iranian shrapnel fell in Tel Aviv.

In the early hours of the day, sirens were activated in Bahrain as the government called for residents to stay safe. Bahrain reported 74 successfully intercepted missiles and 92 drones since 28 February. Amazon Web Services were targeted across the Gulf states causing significant damages in their facilities located in the UAE and Bahrain. The UAE detected numerous missiles heading from Iran 3:30 a.m. local time (23:30 GMT). An Iranian attack on the UAE's Fujairah Oil Industry Zone caused debris to fall and start a fire. The US Consulate in Al Seef, Dubai was struck by multiple drones, resulting in a fire. An attack on Hamad International Airport was stopped by Qatari forces.

The US embassy in Riyadh was struck by two Iranian drones, causing a fire and prompting its closure. The CIA headquarters in Riyadh was reportedly hit by a drone and later in the night the kingdom downed nine drones as soon as they entered Saudi airspace. Iran launched strikes against Irbil, Iraq. The Islamic Resistance in Iraq also claimed responsibility for explosions in Erbil.

==== Lebanon theater ====
Israel's Defense Minister authorized a ground invasion of Lebanon to seize strategic positions. Israel said it detained a dozen Hezbollah members after a rocket strike on Israel. Hezbollah launched drones and missiles at a trio of Israeli bases, and claimed to have struck down an Israeli drone in Nabatieh. World Health Organization Director-General Tedros Adhanom Ghebreyesus said that three paramedics were killed and six injured while working to help affected people in southern Lebanon.

==== Other developments ====
Iran banned food exports, and ordered people to uninstall and disable foreign social media apps on their phones over security concerns. State media announced that Iran has stocked one month of wheat flour and essential food products. Iran announced that the IRGC was setting up checkpoints in cities nationwide. State media reported that Ali Khamenei's son and possible heir Mojtaba Khamenei "miraculously survived missile strike" that killed his father. He was subsequently elected as the new Supreme Leader of Iran.

Western diplomats and other sources told The Jerusalem Post that Qatar had struck Iran after Iranian attempts to directly strike Doha's airport and that Qatar had shot down two Iranian Su-24 bombers; Channel 12 also reported Qatari strikes. Qatari Foreign Ministry spokesperson Majed al-Ansari vigorously denied the accusation that Qatar had joined the "campaign targeting Iran". According to Tasnim, GCC Gulf Shield units were deployed to Bahrain to quell Shia protests.

=== 4 March ===
==== US–Israeli attacks in Iran ====
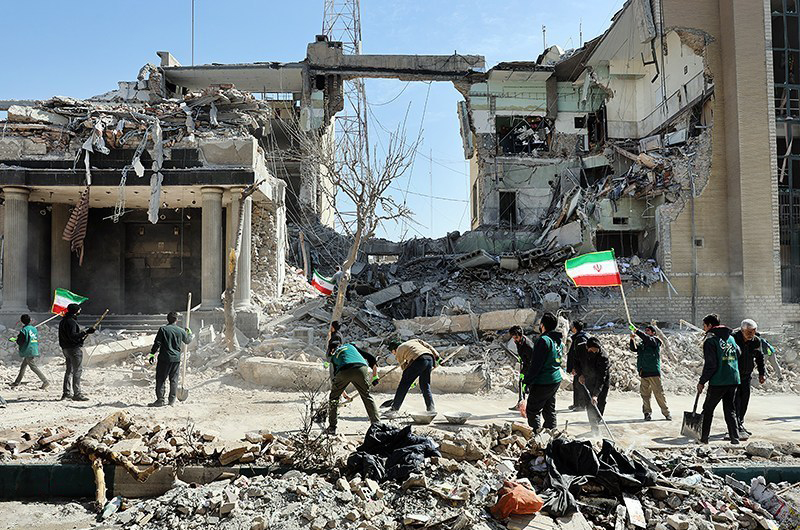
Damaged buildings in Tehran after US–Israeli strikes

HRANA recorded 117 attacks in 23 provinces, and at least 53 casualties including 31 civilian deaths and 25 civilian injuries. Targets hit included industrial towns in Qazvin and Urmia, a garrison in Najafabad, Ba'athat Hospital and a separate surgical center in Tehran, Esmat Girls' High School and a blood transfusion center in Urmia.

A joint US–Israeli strike targeted Azadi square in Tehran as well as military facilities and the metro station. The IAF struck an Iranian military complex in eastern Tehran. Israeli strikes hit the Basij headquarters, as well as missile launch pads, defense systems and the supply and logistics directorate affiliated with Iranian ground forces. At 16:15 UTC Israel announced it had completed a major large scale airstrikes on a major military outpost housing soldiers from all branches of Iran's security apparatus.

The IDF announced that an F-35I "Adir" shot down a Russian-made Iranian Yak-130 fighter jet over Tehran, marking the first time in history a stealth fighter has shot down a crewed fighter jet in combat. It was also the first time the Israeli Air Force shot down an aircraft since 1985.

A US submarine sunk the Iranian warship IRIS Dena off the coast of Galle, Sri Lanka, killing 87 of its crewmen. The Iranian frigate was returning from International Fleet Review 2026, which was held in Visakhapatnam, India. 32 of its crewmen were rescued by the Sri Lankan navy. At 13:15 UTC an Iranian warship sunk by US–Israeli airstrike in the port of Bandar Abbas. The warship was a Soleimani Class Corvette. It was the second Iranian warship sunk that day. According to CENTCOM, the US military cumulatively destroyed 19 Iranian ships, 1 submarine, and nearly 2,000 targets by this point in the war.

The US launched multiple strikes on PMF forces in Iraq throughout the day

==== Iranian attacks ====
IRGCN NEDSA Navy stated they blew up 10 commercial vessels that were attempting to travel through the Strait of Hormuz; one other vessel was hit by bomb near Port Muscat city.

The IRGC Aerospace Force launched an attack on the Port of Fujairah, Dubai, UAE with ballistic missiles. Drones attacked Sulaymaniyah, Iraqi Kurdistan. IRGC Ground Forces attacked Kuwait and Erbil with large amount of drones. An 11-year-old girl was killed in Kuwait after being hit by shrapnel. At 13:45 UTC, Bahrain was attacked by Iranian missiles. The Qatari Ministry of Defense said that Al Udeid Air Base, which has been described as "the largest American base in the Middle East" was hit with no casualties.

Aramco's Ras Tanura oil refining facility in Saudi Arabia was hit by a projectile. A drone was downed in the proximity of Baghdad International Airport, whilst another wave of drones and missiles was intercepted in Erbil. The pro-Iran militia Saraya Awliya al-Dam claim that they struck a "vital US asset" in Jordan, but this was unconfirmed by independent news outlets or CENTCOM.

==== Lebanon theater ====
At 10:00 UTC Syrian forces blocked the Syrian - Lebanese border, in what they said was an effort to block Hezbollah from crossing the border and smuggling weapons in and out of Lebanon. At 11:55 to 12:35 UTC Multiple rockets, missiles, and drones launched towards Israel from Lebanon to the north and Iran from the east, and at 12:35 UTC Israel launched strikes at Hezbollah targets in southern Lebanon. Israeli ground forces moved into Lebanon skirmishing with Hezbollah in the first land based clashes of the war. Hezbollah said that it clashed with Israeli forces attempting to advance in Khiam and launched rocket barrages at a concentration of troops in Kiryat Shmona. Hezbollah also said that it struck an Israeli tank in the town of Houla, Lebanon. Israel later said that two of its soldiers were injured by anti-tank fire.

==== Cyprus ====
Hellenic Air Force F-16 fighters downed multiple Iranian Shahed drones near Cyprus. Larnaca International Airport was temporarily closed in response. Reports suggested a closure of Cypriot airspace, but it was later dismissed as false by the Cypriot government. A ballistic missile was intercepted by NATO forces in Turkey in Dörtyol, Hatay Province, with a statement after interception stating that Turkey reserved the right to defend its territory and that the ordnance had fallen in its territory. No casualties were reported by the statement. A senior US military official said that it had been shot down by an SM-3 interceptor launched from USS Oscar Austin. An anonymous Turkish official stated that the missile was directed towards "Greek Cyprus". Non-essential American workers in Cyprus were asked to evacuate the country due to the risks of a possible Iranian incursion in the future. After, the US State Department issued a travel advisory for Cyprus during the current crisis. In an emergency meeting in Rome, Prime Minister of Italy Giorgia Meloni and other Italian officials considered sending reinforcement to Cyprus after the deployment by other European nations (Greece, France, Germany and the United Kingdom), specifically considering the deployment of the destroyer Caio Duilio as a possibility (with capability up to 350 kilometers).

==== Other developments ====
Iraq's national power grid went down.

According to an unnamed official from the Coalition of Political Forces of Iranian Kurdistan, Iraqi-based Kurdish armed groups consisting of thousands of the Kurdistan Free Life Party (PJAK) troops began a military offensive into Iranian territory, with operations beginning earlier on 2 March. American and Israeli officials reportedly confirmed the events. However, an unnamed PJAK official denied the claims of an ongoing offensive and cross-border troop movements, as did Aziz Ahmed, deputy chief of staff to Kurdistan Region's prime minister Masrour Barzani. Iranian Arab separatist group Ahwaz Falcons attacked an IRGC facility in the city of Ahvaz.

Qatar arrested ten individuals for operating as a cell of the IRGC in Qatari territory, collecting data on military infrastructure, with some trained to use drones. QatarEnergy declared force majeure on gas exports and shut down gas liquefaction.

=== 5 March ===
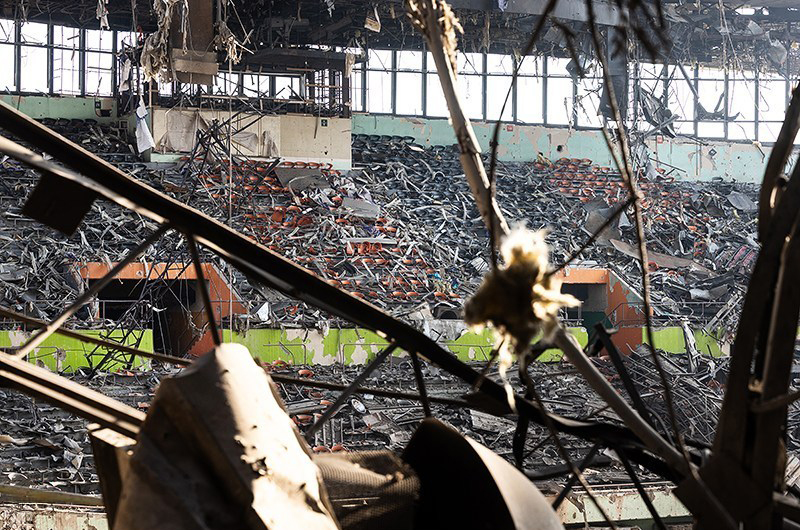
Damage after an airstrike on the 12,000-seat Azadi Hall 33

==== US–Israeli attacks in Iran ====
HRANA recorded 170 attacks in 19 provinces and at least 79 casualties, including 9 civilians killed, one of whom was a child, and 38 civilians injured. 29 casualties could not be immediately classified as civilian or military. Targets hit included the Ministry of Intelligence office in Sardasht, an IRGC garrison in Sanandaj, a paper factory in Malayer, and a border terminal in Dasht-e Azadegan. Iran's largest sports complex, the 12,000-seat indoor arena at Tehran's Azadi Indoor Stadium, was destroyed by an American-Israeli strike, following reports that authorities had been using stadiums for military purposes. Israel and the US launched another wave of attacks on Tehran, also hitting a police station, a residential building, the Yas Nabi Girls' Elementary School, Basat Stadium and the District 18 municipality.

==== Iranian and Hezbollah strikes ====
Saudi Arabia reported that in the early hours of the day they had intercepted three cruise missiles outside the city of Al-Kharj.

Iran said it targeted Kurdish groups in Iraq and warned separatists amid the expanding conflict. Early on 5 March, Iran launched another round of missiles at Israel, setting off air-raid alerts in areas including Tel Aviv, though no casualties were immediately reported. Suspected debris from an intercepted Iranian missile landed in Petah Tikva, causing a fire.

Iran targeted a US oil tanker in the Persian Gulf.

Iranian drones entered Azerbaijani airspace. One drone hit the terminal of the Nakhchivan International Airport and another fell near a school in the village of Şəkərabad. Azerbaijan summoned their Iranian ambassador, withdrew their diplomats from Iran, and promised a military response. Iran's foreign minister Abbas Araghchi denied that Iran had attacked Azerbaijan, and suggested that it was an Israeli false flag attack. Azer News reported that a Telegram channel affiliated with the Islamic Revolutionary Guard Corps, "Sepah Pasdaran News Channel", claimed responsibility for the attack in Nakhchivan. Azerbaijani president Ilham Aliyev said that "Iran committed terror acts against Azerbaijan". Turkey likewise condemned the strikes in Azerbaijan.

==== Other developments ====
UK defence minister John Healey visited Cyprus. No missiles were sent toward the country, but alarms in British bases rang twice, causing widespread panic and self evacuations in the local population. Italy, the Netherlands and Spain confirmed that they will be sending warships to defend Cyprus, including the Cristóbal Colón frigate. If requested, Ireland stated they would be willing to protect Cyprus and join the European defense coalition that had mobilized around the island.

Ukrainian president Volodymyr Zelenskyy stated that Ukraine had received an American request for assistance with Iranian Shahed drones. President Trump stated that he would accept Ukrainian assistance.

=== 6 March ===
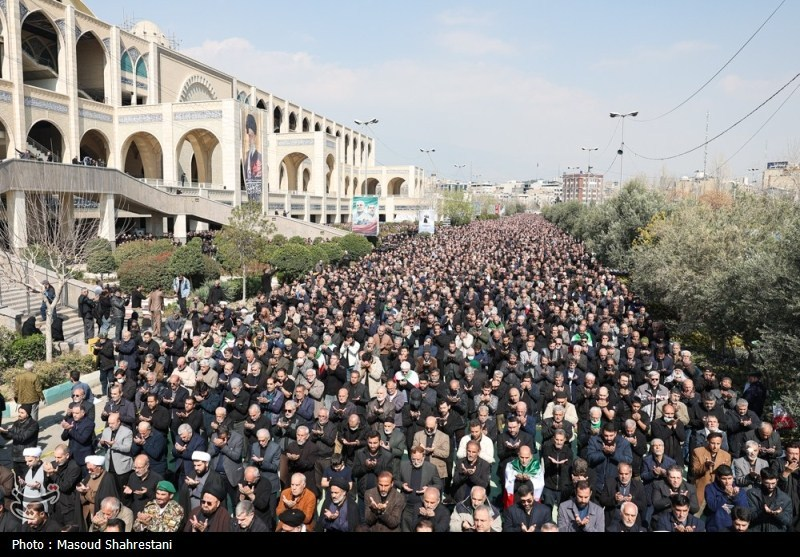
Worshippers gather at the Imam Khomeini Mosalla for the first Friday prayer after the 2026 airstrikes on Tehran.

==== US–Israeli strikes ====
HRANA recorded 664 attacks in 28 provinces, and at least 25 casualties including 4 civilian deaths and 9 injuries. The US and Israel executed heavy airstrikes on Tehran, on targets including Mehrabad airport, a police station, an IRGC base, and residential units. Strikes also took place on Kermanshah as well as Salmas, Maku and Saqqez in western Iran. US and Israeli airstrikes also hit intelligence sites in Lorestan and Ilam, and a Ministry of Intelligence office building in Sarpol-e Zahab. Other targets included the Fars Governate building and a medical emergency team/operational base in Shiraz, the Mahabad Red Crescent, and a facility of the National Iranian Oil Company in Miandoab.

==== Iranian and Hezbollah strikes and renewed Gulf offensive ====
Iran opened a new and wider campaign on Gulf states with attacks on Saudi Arabia (3 missiles had been intercepted at Prince Sultan Air Base), Kuwait (with drones and missiles), Qatar (where 13 missiles were intercepted), Bahrain (where a hotel and two residential buildings were targeted), and the UAE.

Late on Friday, drones struck Iraqi airports and oil facilities; in Basra, a compound housing foreign oil-company workers, including Halliburton and KBR facilities, was hit and caught fire.

==== Other developments ====
President Masoud Pezeshkian issued an apology on state television for waves of Iranian attacks against neighbouring countries, stating that Iran had not attacked "friendly and neighboring countries".

The Sri Lanka Navy announced that the Sri Lanka Navy would take charge of the Iranian tanker IRIS Bushehr and its crew of 208, with the crew to be brought ashore and the vessel moved to the Trincomalee area. This is the first instance of a warship being interned in a neutral country since World War II.

Three Ghanaian peacekeepers enrolled in UNIFIL were hit by a missile and wounded in Southern Lebanon. Responsibility for the attack was unclear.

In Azerbaijan, an alleged Iranian-linked terrorist plot against the Baku–Tbilisi–Ceyhan oil pipeline, the Israeli embassy and synagogues in Baku is prevented by local law enforcement, with the trial of said alleged terrorists starting on the same day, during which they were identified as being part of a cell of the Islamic State known as "Vilayati-Khorasan" and the IRGC.

=== 7 March ===
==== US–Israeli attacks in Iran ====
HRANA reported 485 attacks in 30 provinces and 53 casualties, including at least 33 civilians killed and 8 injured. US and Israeli forces executed strikes on many targets in Tehran and Isfahan including Mehrabad International Airport, where the IDF said that it destroyed 16 Quds Force aircraft, as well as a logistics and support garrison and an emergency response base in Tehran. Other targets included airbases in Ahvaz and Isfahan, a medical clinic in Zanganeh, a girls' school in Khomein and a home in Eslamshahr.

==== Iranian retaliation ====
The IRGC said that it attacked the Malta-flagged oil tanker Prima with a drone after "ignoring repeated warnings from the IRGC Navy regarding the prohibition of traffic and the unsafe nature of the Strait of Hormuz".

The compounds and oil refineries structures of the US-based firm Halliburton located in Basra are hit by Iranian strikes.

==== Other developments ====
The US approved a $151M arms sale to Israel, and sent a third aircraft carrier, USS George H. W. Bush, to the Middle East.

Kuwait Petroleum Corporation declared force majeure and began cutting its oil output by an unspecified amount.

Iran's President Masoud Pezeshkian released a video message apologizing for "fire at will" attacks on neighbouring countries and instructed them to stop, although attacks continued shortly afterward.

=== 8 March ===
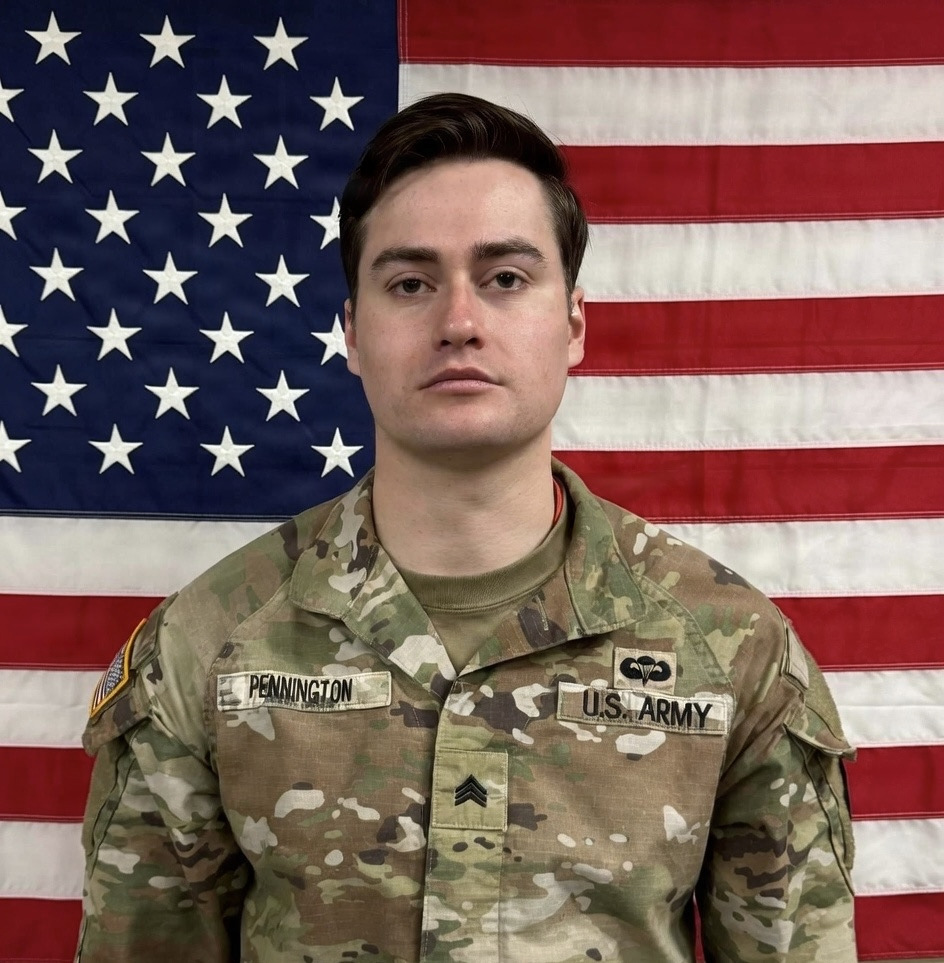
Sgt. Benjamin N. Pennington of the 1st Space Battalion, who died on 8 March 2026 from wounds sustained during an attack at Prince Sultan Air Base, Saudi Arabia

==== US–Israeli strikes ====
Overnight Israeli airstrikes hit Iran's oil facilities for the first time, killing four people and releasing large clouds of dark smoke into the air, raising concerns over fuel shortages, water and soil contamination and respiratory hazards. HRANA reported 752 attacks in 30 provinces, and 83 unclassified casualties, including 33 people killed and 50 injured. Targets struck included the Kamal Esmail Basij Base and an army garrison in Isfahan, an IRGC brigade in Shahin Shahr, a border guard regiment in Paveh, the Border Guard Command Headquarters in Kermanshah, a swimming complex in Isfahan, a stadium in Shahin Shahr, a seminary building in Qom, and a judiciary building in Zarrin Shahr. Israeli American airstrikes hit the IRGC aerospace headquarters and 50 ammunition storage shelters. US officials stated that Iran was using heavy populated areas to conduct military operations. Following some missile attack(s), the Rowing Federation of Iran building suffered serious damage. Following the Israeli and American attacks on Iranian soil, the Hockey Federation building located in Tehran's Enghelab Sports Complex was damaged and suffered serious damage. The Tennis Federation of Iran building suffered serious damage by the attacks.

==== Iranian strikes ====
Israeli rescue services said that at least three people were injured by shrapnel belonging to Iranian missiles. The IRGC said that its missiles hit "military targets" in Tel Aviv and Beersheba as well as the Muwaffaq Salti Air Base in Azraq, Jordan.

An Iranian drone strike caused a fire in a Kuwait City tower belonging to the Public Institution for Social Security. Kuwait reported that two of its officers were killed on duty.

US Central Command announced the death of a seventh US service member from an Iranian attack.

The United Kingdom's Ministry of Defence confirmed that its forces had intercepted an Iranian drone headed towards Iraq, and declared its intention to send a Merlin helicopter to the region to help aid in detecting future aerial threats.

=== 9 March ===
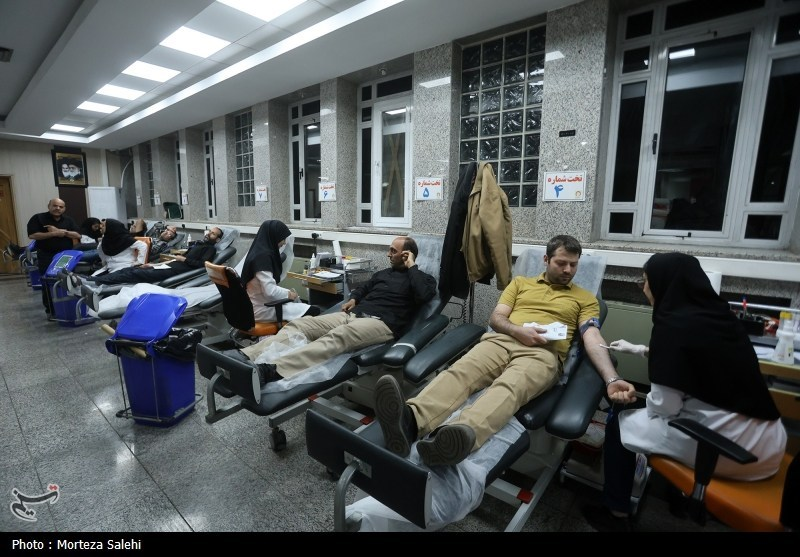
Blood donation in Isfahan, March 2026

==== US–Israeli strikes ====
HRANA recorded 285 attacks in 17 provinces and at least 61 casualties, including at least 40 civilians killed and 8 injured, as well as 11 unclassified deaths. Strikes primarily targeted Tehran and Isfahan. Extensive damage was dealt to historical sites in Isfahan. Targets stuck included Optical Defense Industries in Isfahan, Soru Pier in Bandar Abbas, a law enforcement building in Mobarakeh, Shahid Montazeri Camp in Shahriar, Sahab Pardaz Informatics Company building in Tehran, the Chehel Sotoun Palace-Museum and Ali Qapu Palace-Museum in Isfahan, Shahidan Nasiri Stadium and Safaian Clinic and Medical Center, and an automobile dealership in Lam.

==== Iranian strikes ====
An explosion near Manama sparked a fire near a petroleum refinery and resulted in injuries to at least 32 Bahraini citizens, four of them "serious cases". An analysis by academic researchers examined by Reuters found that an American-operated Patriot missile was likely involved in the blast after it downed an Iranian drone mid-air. The UAE said that it intercepted 12 ballistic missiles and 17 drones from Iran.

Saudi Arabia said that its forces had destroyed four drones targeting Shaybah oil field.

Iran continued firing missiles on Israel with reports saying that at least one was carrying a cluster of bomb warhead. A cluster bomb attack killed two workers at a construction site in Yehud and injured a third in Or Yehuda.

==== Khamenei's election as new leader ====
Following the killing of Ali Khamenei, the former leader of the Islamic Republic of Iran, in the Iran-2026 war, Mojtaba Khamenei was elected as the new leader of Iran.

==== Other developments ====
BAPCO declared force majeure on oil exports after an Iranian attack hit its only refinery.

Iran declared that they would bring more security passage to the countries that expel US and Israel ambassadors.

By 9 March, shipping insurance rates for the strait were reported to have increased by four to six times over the previous week.

=== 10 March ===
==== US–Israeli strikes ====
HRANA reported 202 attacks across 19 provinces, with 53 casualties including at least 17 civilians killed and 19 injured, as well as 8 unclassified deaths. An attack on an intersection along Tehran's Resalat Highway resulted in a large number of civilian casualties. Other targets stuck included airbases in Bandar Abbas and Isfahan, an IRGC intelligence headquarters in Qom, the Kerman Airport fuel depot, a law enforcement building in Azarshahr, the Najafabad courthouse, a residential neighborhood in Mehrshahr, and a battery company and municipal informatics building in Tehran. Israel said that it struck a weapons research site in Tehran. The US said it struck multiple Iranian minelaying ships.

==== Iranian strikes ====
Abu Dhabi National Oil Company shut down its Ruwais refinery due to fire from a drone strike. Saudi Civil Defense said that a drone fell in Al-Zulfi City, causing material damage but no injuries. Iran targeted US military sites in Harir Air Base in the Kurdistan region of Iraq.

Syrian media reported that Israeli had intercepted Iranian drones in the towns of Jalin and the Israeli-occupied town of Quneitra.

==== Other developments ====
The UNHCR reported that about 700 thousand people were displaced in Lebanon by Israeli bombing and mass evacuations.

=== 11 March ===
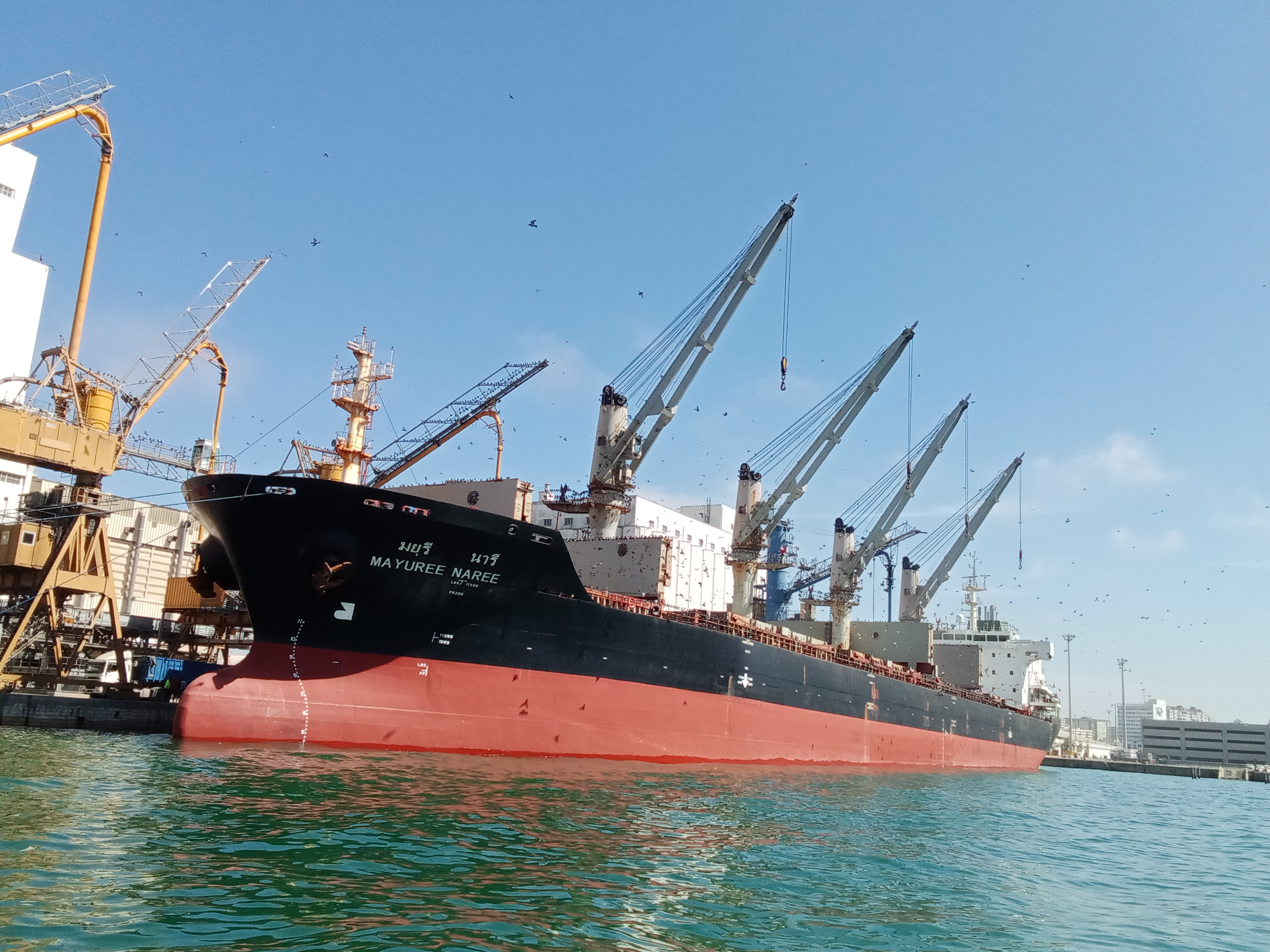
The Mayuree Naree pictured in 2023

==== US–Israeli strikes ====
HRANA reported 208 attacks in 22 provinces and at least 44 casualties, including 14 civilians killed and 6 injured. Targets hit included army and IRGC bases in Isfahan and Chabahar, a missile site in Khomeinishahr, a police station in Saqqez, a training garrison in Birjand, the Persian Gulf Martyrs Hospital in Bushehr, the Shaqayeq Girls' School in Khomein, a gas station and oil depot in Tehran, and two residential homes in Bandar Lengeh. Israeli drone strikes hit checkpoints in Tehran, killing at least ten people, including several Basij members. Among the dead in the strike was eleven-year-old child soldier Alireza Jafari, whose death was cited by Amnesty International, which called the organized Iranian recruitment of children as young as Jafari a war crime.

==== Iranian strikes ====
Iran fired dozens of missiles at targets throughout the Gulf region as the US and Israel launched attacks on targets in Iran. IRGC announced attacks against Camp Buehring in Kuwait in a two-pronged missile attack, as well as drone and missile attacks on US infrastructure at the Mina Salman port in Bahrain (Naval Support Activity Bahrain), as well as the Kuwait Naval Base (Camp Patriot) and Ali Al Salem Air Base in Kuwait. Two drones fell near Dubai International Airport, wounding four people. Drones also struck fuel tanks at the Port of Salalah, Oman, leading the port to suspend its operations.

The bulk carrier Mayuree Naree (IMO 9323649) was hit by two missiles shortly after passing the Strait of Hormuz. The vessel caught fire and most of the crew abandoned ship. Marshall Islands-flagged bulk carrier Star Gwyneth (IMO 9301031) and Japan-flagged container vessel One Majesty (IMO 9424912) were also reported to have been damaged by unknown projectiles in the vicinity of the Strait. The spokesperson of the Iraqi armed forces, Lieutenant General Saad Maan, said that two foreign vessels were hit near the port of Al-Faw, one person was killed while 35 people were rescued.

=== 12 March ===
==== US–Israeli strikes ====
HRANA recorded 312 attacks in 15 provinces and at least 124 casualties including 10 civilians killed and 91 injured, as well as 21 deaths that could not be immediately classified as civilian or military. Targets included the 92nd Armored Division and a military headquarters in Ahvaz, production units and a warehouse in an industrial district in Arak, a naval base in Konarak, the Dareh Shour tourist camp in Qeshm, Rashk-e Jenan Historic Palace in Isfahan, residential areas in Behbahan and Ahvaz, and the Boostan Hospital in Ahvaz.

The Popular Mobilization Forces (PMF) militia's 18th brigade headquarters in Al-Qa'im, Iraq, was hit by a direct strike. The overnight strikes on Al-Qa'im killed 15 people, while another strike on a PMF base near Kirkuk killed five people. The strikes on the PMF were condemned by the Iraqi government.

==== Iranian strikes ====
Iran fired 10 ballistic missiles with multiple warheads at Tel Aviv; Israel reported 124 people injured. Iran said it targeted IDF bases including Palmachim Airbase, and Ovda Airbase as well as the Shin Bet headquarters.

On the night of 11 to 12 March, Iranian drones hit Bahrain International Airport on Muharraq Island and set fuel tanks on fire. They also hit coalition military camps near Erbil and Baghdad in Iraq, wounding a number of US soldiers. 2 drones were shot down by British troops. A drone attack on a Peshmerga base in the Malla Qara subdistrict of Makhmur district, injured six French soldiers. One soldier, Arnaud Frion, 7th Chasseurs Alpins was later reported killed in action.

Two fuel tankers, Maltese-flagged Zefyros (IMO 9515917) and Marshall Islands-flagged Safesea Vishnu (IMO 9327009), are attacked in Iraqi waters and catch fire. Iraqi oil terminals suspend operations. Reporters assume that the ships have been attacked by Iranian explosive-laden boats.

==== Other developments ====
An American Boeing KC-135 Stratotanker crashed in western Iraq, killing all six crew. Another was damaged and made an emergency landing.

The first statement attributed to Iran's new Supreme Leader Mojtaba Khamenei was read in Iranian state media by a newsreader. In the statement, Mojtaba Khamenei vowed to keep the Strait of Hormuz closed and warned countries in the region to stop hosting US bases.

The UN High Commissioner for Refugees announced that 3 million people in Iran had been internally displaced due to the war.

=== 13 March ===
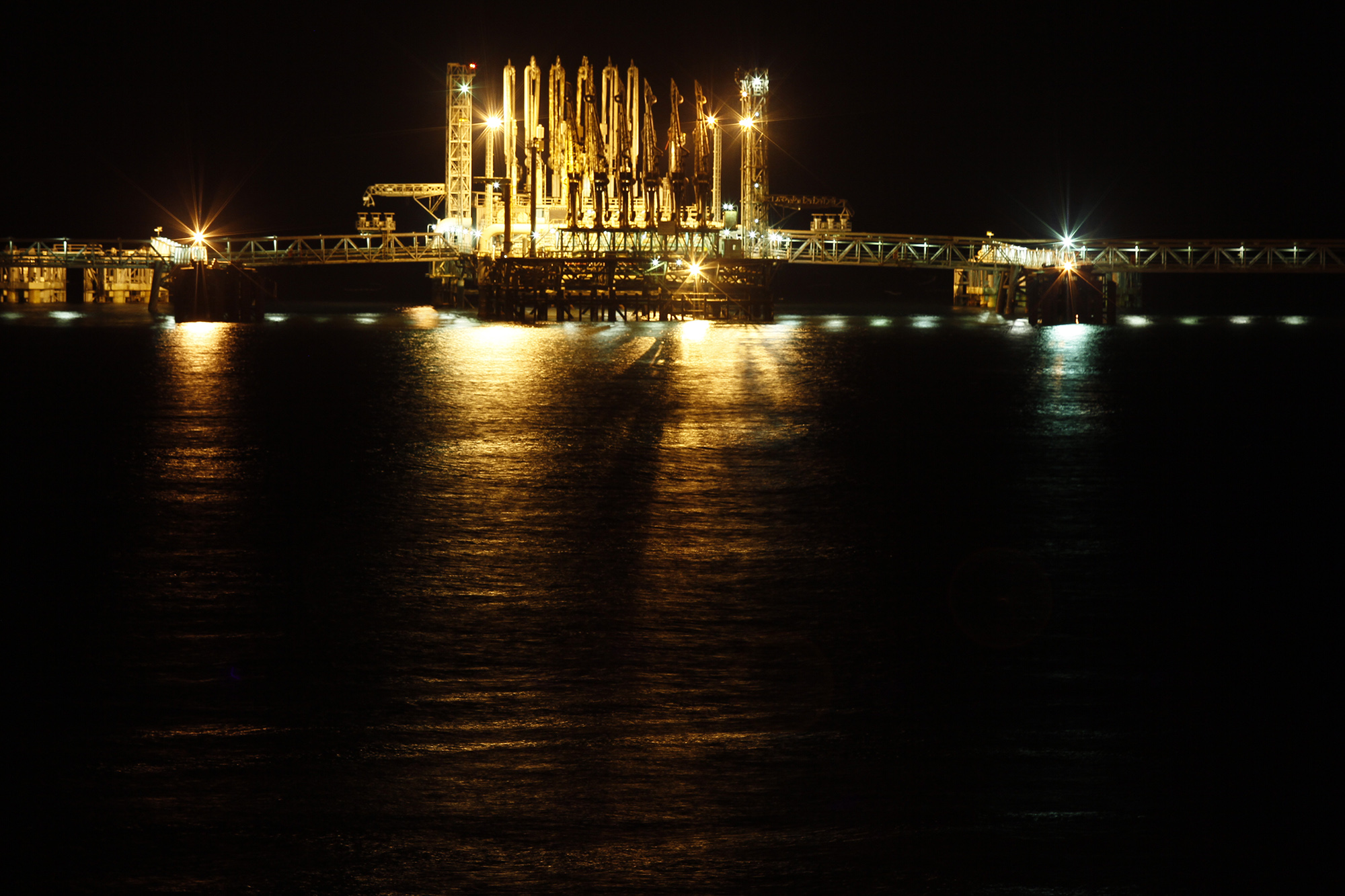
Infrastructure on Kharg Island, 2018

==== US–Israeli strikes ====
The US bombed Kharg Island, a major Iranian oil export hub, with Trump stating that every military site was destroyed on the island. Explosions were reported in Tehran during rallies for Quds Day. One person was killed by shrapnel.

==== Iranian strikes ====
An Iranian missile strike in Zarzir, Israel damaged around 300 homes and injured around 60 people. A drone attack at the Awahi Industrial Area of Sohar, Oman, killed two people and injured 11 others.

The US Rewards for Justice Program offered an up to US$10 million bounty for ten top Iranian leaders, including Mojtaba Khamenei.

The Wall Street Journal reported that a strike on Prince Sultan Air Base earlier in the week damaged five US refueling tankers.

=== 14 March ===
==== US–Israeli strikes ====
HRANA recorded 285 attacks in 18 provinces, with the largest number of attacks in Isfahan. At least 24 civilians, including one child, were killed and 4 were injured. Targets included naval facilities in Bandar Abbas, Shiraz International Airport and an electronics factory in Shiraz, an aerospace research center in Tehran, as well as residential units in the Javadieh neighborhood and the dormitory of the Shooting Sports Federation. An aircraft manufacturing company in Shahin Shahr was hit, as was the Jamkaran Grand Mosque in Qom, a food processing factory in Sirjan and a residential house in Yazd. The IDF announced that it killed two senior members of the Khatam al-Anbiya Central Headquarters intelligence unit who were appointed as its acting chiefs after the killing of Saleh Asadi.

==== Iranian strikes ====
A drone attack on Fujairah's oil terminal caused a fire that forced a partial suspension of operations. A helipad at the US embassy in Iraq in Baghdad was struck by an aerial attack. A drone attack on the Ahmad al-Jaber Air Base lightly injured three Kuwaiti soldiers. Another attack on the Kuwait International Airport damaged a radar system. Iranian missile fragments hit Eilat, seriously injuring a child and lightly injuring another man.

Indian tankers Shivalik and Nanda Devi, carrying a combined 92,700 metric tons of liquefied natural gas, pass safely through the Strait of Hormuz after talks between foreign minister of India Subrahmanyam Jaishankar and foreign minister of Iran Abbas Araghchi.

==== Other developments ====
Trump called on several nations to send warships to help secure the Strait of Hormuz amid the Iranian closure, expressing hopes that the UK, France, China, South Korea, and Japan, would support this international effort.

=== 15 March ===
==== US–Israeli strikes ====
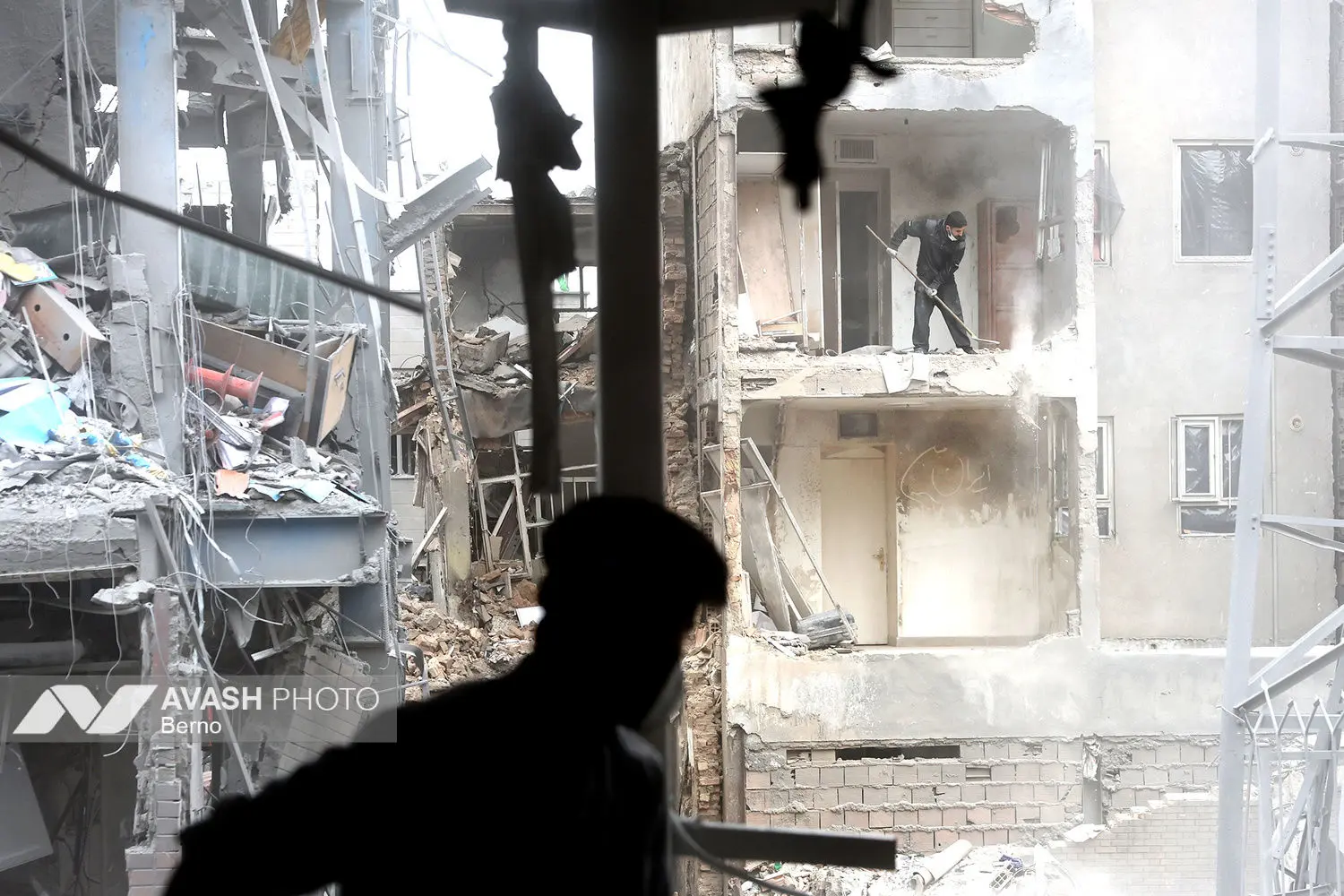
Destruction in a residential area of Tehran, Iran, following joint US–Israeli airstrikes on 15 March 2026

HRANA recorded 494 attacks in 16 provinces and a total of at least 49 casualties, including 11 civilians killed and 22 injured. Early on 15 March, heavy airstrikes were reported in the Isfahan area, along with 20 explosions heard near Shiraz, heavy explosions in southern Tehran, Dezful Air Base, Khomein, and Hamadan. A video showed extensive damage from an airstrike at the Jask port in Hormozgan Province. Residents throughout the country have reported increased deployment of security forces. A joint US–Israel attack on Isfahan killed 15 people. Targets of the day's strikes included airbases in Isfahan, Dezful and Bandar Abbas, the Kobraei missile base, the Al-Hadid Garrison in Ahvaz, a courthouse in Hamadan, two schools in Joulan, a sports hall in Arak, a municipal warehouse in Nobriz, and a medical center in the suburbs of Tehran.

==== Iranian strikes ====
The IRGC said it had launched its "50th wave of operations" against American bases (in UAE, Bahrain and Kuwait). Iran's military vowed to "pursue and kill" Israeli prime minister Benjamin Netanyahu.

==== Iranian public ====
As of 15 March, pro-government rallies have been visible in Tehran's major squares.

=== 16 March ===
==== US–Israeli strikes ====
65% of the day's attacks hit Tehran, with the remainder in a geographically dispersed pattern. HRANA recorded 243 attacks and at least 66 casualties, including 21 civilians killed and 31 injured. Targets included the District 13 Air Force Base in Tehran, the Peykanshahr Basij Base, and Mehrabad International Airport, where the IDF said that it destroyed an aircraft used by senior Iranian officials, including former supreme leader Ali Khamenei. An electricity department building and eleven residential buildings in Tehran, including an eight-story building on Zarafshan Street, were destroyed in the strikes. Military targets in Chabahar and Shiraz, as well as the Shahed Imam Reza School in Khomein and a desalination plant in Nikshahr. It also said that it destroyed a space research facility in Tehran that was used to develop attack satellites. Kata'ib Hezbollah announced the death of Abu Ali al-Askari, a senior commander who was reportedly killed in Baghdad.

==== Iranian strikes ====
A drone attack set a fuel tank at Dubai International Airport on fire in the early morning. Flights were initially suspended, but service was restored over the course of the morning. A drone attack also caused a fire at the Port of Fujairah, and a Palestinian was killed by a rocket near Abu Dhabi.

The first two floors of the Royal Tulip Al-Rasheed Hotel in Baghdad's Green Zone were hit by a drone whilst hosting a European Union and Saudi Arabian delegation. The attack was not claimed by anyone, however, due to the proximity of a similar attack that had happened 48 hours earlier against the US embassy in Baghdad, it is suspected to have been an Iranian attack.

==== Other items ====
- The Lebanese Ministry of Health: 38 healthcare workers have been killed and 69 injured since the escalation of the Israeli attacks on the country.
- 886 were killed in Israeli attacks on Lebanon from 2 to 16 March; and 2,141 people were also injured.
- Tehran said the Strait of Hormuz is open to all except the US and its allies.

=== 17 March ===
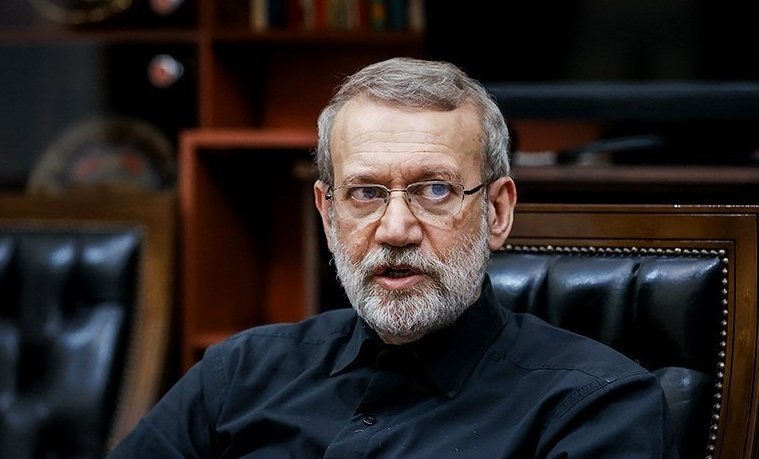
Ali Larijani was killed in an Israeli airstrike on 17 March.

==== US–Israeli strikes ====
HRANA recorded 179 attacks and at least 19 total casualties, included 3 civilians killed and 4 injured. Drone attacks targeting police stations and checkpoints increased, even in densely populated urban areas. Almost half of the day's attacks were on targets in the Tehran province. The Basij Command Headquarters and the IRGC garrison in Saadat Abad were hit, as were the Panahi Sports Complex, the Shahid Kazemi Sports Complex and two wrestling halls. Historic buildings in the Saadabad complex were damaged. The Shahid Ebadat garrison in Marivan and a missile site in Khomeini Shahr were also targeted. A strike hit the area of the Bushehr Nuclear Power Plant, causing no damage. Several senior Iranian officials, including Ali Larijani, Basij chief Gholamreza Soleimani, and 300 Basij officials were killed by overnight Israeli airstrikes. The US used GBU-72 "bunker bombs" to target sites believed to contain Iranian anti-ship missiles.

==== Iranian strikes ====
Iran launched a missile barrage that killed an elderly couple in Ramat Gan while they were on their way to a bomb shelter. Iranian missiles also damaged platforms at the Tel Aviv–Savidor Center railway station.

Kuwait-flagged liquified petroleum tanker Gas Al Ahmadiah suffered minor damage after being attacked by a projectile east of Fujairah.

==== Other developments ====
US director of the National Counterterrorism Center Joe Kent resigned over the war, stating that he believed that Iran did not pose an imminent threat to the US and that Donald Trump was induced to take action by Israel and its lobby in the US.

=== 18 March ===
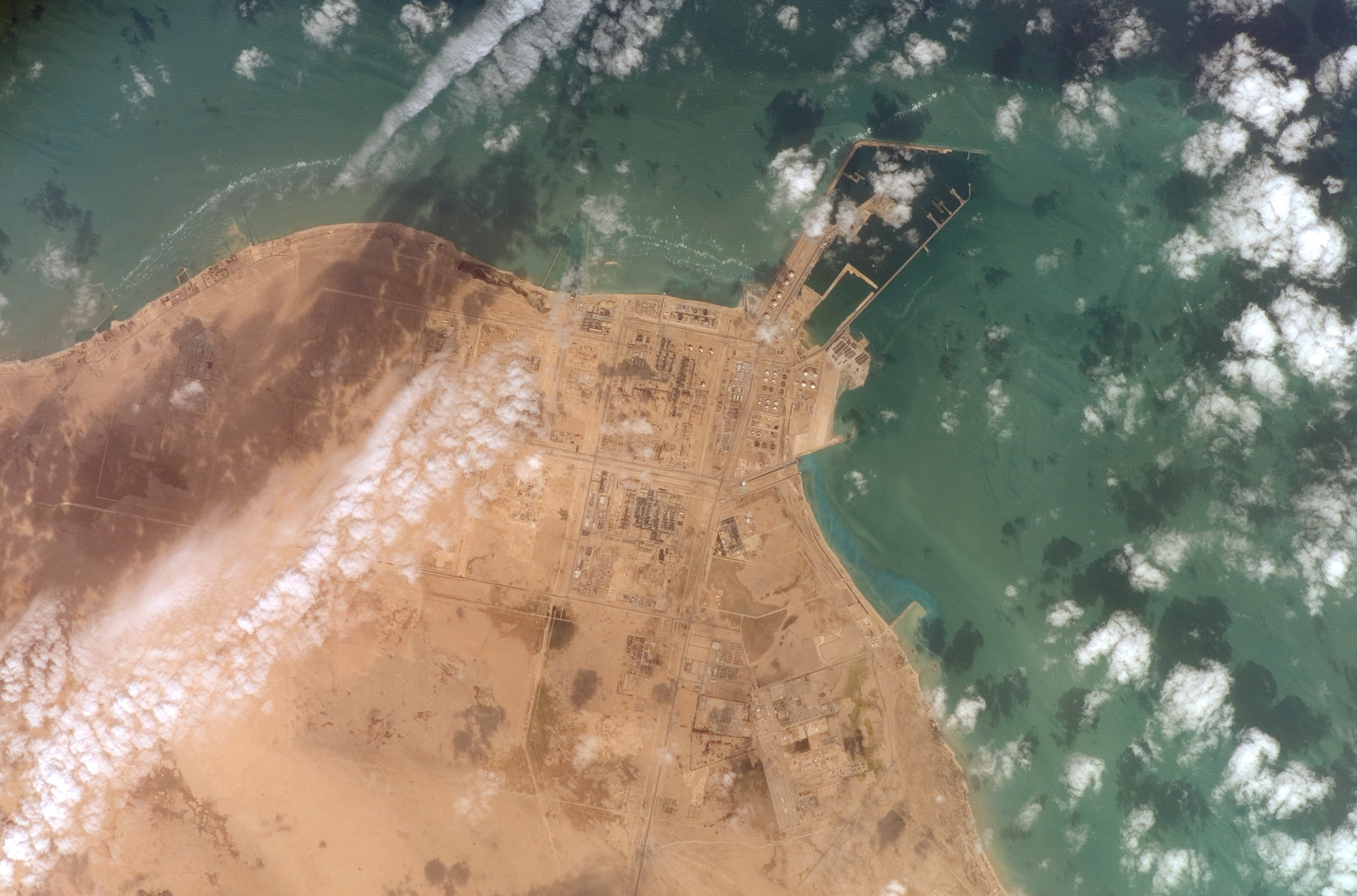
Ras Laffan Industrial City (pictured in 2006) was struck by Iranian missiles.

==== US–Israeli strikes ====
An Israeli strike hit Russia-Iran weapons transport route in the Caspian Sea. Esmaeil Khatib, Iran's Minister of Intelligence, was assassinated during overnight Israeli strikes in Tehran. Multiple explosions were reported in the early morning hours. Targets included naval zones and major port facilities, including areas around Shahid Bahonar and Shahid Rajaee ports, as well as near an oil terminal in Bandar Abbas. A strong explosion shook Ahvaz in the Zeytoun Karmandi area. An early-morning blast was reported in Songhor, a town close to the Iraqi border, while another explosion was heard near Kazerun in southern Iran. West of Tehran, multiple blasts occurred in Malard over a short time span. In Fardis, US–Israeli strikes targeted a helicopter manufacturing facility in the Naz industrial district. Fath Army Base in Karaj was hit by strikes, as were the town's welfare offices, rehabilitation center for persons with disabilities, and residential areas. Police stations in Qom and Bandar Lengeh were also hit.

A video showed a heavy strike in northern Tehran on Wednesday morning. Israel said that it targeted Iran's command centers in Tehran. A medical center in Tehran was also hit. Parts of the Iranian South Pars gas field were hit by an Israeli airstrike, and the gas field's refineries in Asaluyeh were also hit. Israeli strikes targeted at least five Iranian naval vessels in the Caspian Sea, with explosions being heard in Bandar-e Anzali, threatening some of the two-way weapons traffic between Russia and Iran, mainly Shahed drone equipment, although the two countries also transport equipment through Azerbaijan. An airstrike hit the courthouse in Larestan. HRANA recorded 79 attacks and at least 125 casualties. At least 15 civilians were killed and 105 were injured.

==== Iranian strikes ====
Iranian missiles hit Qatar's Ras Laffan Industrial City, causing fires and significant damage to the gas facility. Qatar responded by banning the Iranian embassy's military attaches from its territory. Fragments from an Iranian missile interception damaged three private jets at Ben Gurion Airport. A missile attack killed three Palestinians and injured 13 in Beit Awwa, West Bank, and killed a foreign worker in Adanim.

==== Other developments ====
The International Maritime Organization (IMO) held an extraordinary session regarding humanitarian passage for the 20,000 seafarers stranded on 3,200 vessels (both figures approximate) west of the strait. On 18 March, thousands of civilians joined a funeral procession for Ali Larijani.

=== 19 March ===
==== US–Israeli strikes ====
HRANA reported 70 attacks in 12 provinces, and at least 75 casualties including 25 civilians killed and 5 wounded. The day's strikes were the first to target the Caspian Sea region, with strikes hitting several other provinces as well, especially Iran's oil and gas facilities in Asaluyeh. The IDF said that it destroyed an IRGC Mil Mi-17 helicopter in Sanandaj Airport. An Israeli strike targeted Basij members. Israel said that it would continue to attack people associated with the Iranian government. The representative of the armed forces to the Basij, Afshin Naghshbandi, was killed in an airstrike. An airstrike on a Basij checkpoint in Tabriz killed 13 fighters and injured 18 others.

==== Iranian strikes ====
A BAZAN Group refinery in Haifa was hit during a broader Iranian missile attack on the area. Mina Al-Ahmadi refinery in Kuwait was hit by Iranian drones, causing a fire. A US F-35 was allegedly damaged by Iranian fire during a combat mission over Iran. The aircraft made an emergency landing at a US airbase in the Middle East. IRGC published footage of the shooting. This is considered as the first direct hit on an F-35 in history.

==== Other developments ====
Netanyahu hosted a press conference asserting he was well. Qatar declared the Iranian military and security attachés persona non grata, giving them 24 hours to leave the country.

=== 20 March ===
==== US–Israeli strikes ====
HRANA recorded 640 strikes in 17 provinces, and at least 68 casualties including 4 civilians killed and 6 injured. Targets hit included Basij and army bases and garrisons in Semnan, Ahvaz, Bandar Abbas and Urmia. Residential and administrative buildings were hit in Tehran, as were the Falak-ol-Aflak Historic Site in Khorramabad, an accommodation complex in Shahmirzad and a residential building in Karaj. IRGC spokesman Ali Mohammad Naini and his deputy were assassinated by an Israeli airstrike. The IDF also announced that Basij intelligence chief Ismail Ahmadi was killed in the strike that killed Gholamreza Soleimani.

==== Iranian strikes ====
Iran allegedly launched two ballistic missiles towards Diego Garcia, which houses a US–UK military base, though both failed to hit the island. While one of the missile broke apart mid-flight, another was intercepted by a SM-3 air defence missile launched by a US warship. Iran later denied claims that it launched missiles towards Diego Garcia, saying that it was an "Israeli false flag" attack.

After Iran launched nine ballistic missiles towards Jerusalem, reports indicated that at least three of the missiles were equipped with cluster munition warheads. The strikes caused damage to residential structures and resulted in minor injuries among several civilians. Debris from an intercepted missile fell within the Old City of Jerusalem, approximately 400 metres (1,300 ft) from the Western Wall and the Al-Aqsa Mosque compound on the Temple Mount. No injuries were reported.

==== Other developments ====
Iran denied targeting Turkey and Oman, saying that they were "Israeli false flag" attacks. Switzerland announced that the country would not issue licences to export weapons by companies to the United States, citing neutrality.

=== 21 March ===
==== US–Israeli strikes ====
HRANA reported 348 attacks in 16 provinces, and at least 16 casualties including 8 civilians killed and 6 injured. The majority of the day's strikes targeted the Tehran area. Targets hit included Imam Ali Hospital in Andimeshk, a tourist complex in Ahvaz, passenger and fishing piers in Bushehr, military facilities in Tehran, Bandar Abbas, Yazd and Dezful, and the regional headquarters of the IRGC in Isfahan. Israeli airstrikes targeted several Tehran sites used to produce ballistic missiles. Iran said that an airstrike hit a uranium enrichment center in Natanz. The IDF said that it struck an alleged nuclear weapons development and research site at Tehran's Malek-Ashtar University of Technology. A Basij site in Najafabad was "flattened" in an airstrike.

==== Iranian strikes ====
Three drone strikes targeted an American diplomatic and logistics hub which houses troops in Baghdad International Airport. Later, a strike in a military base in Tuz Khurmatu killed a Hashed Al-Shaabi fighter and injured another. Iranian missile fragments hit a kindergarten in Tel Aviv. Later, an Iranian missile strike collapsed a building in Dimona, injuring 64 people, including one child critically. Iran said that it targeted Shimon Peres Negev Nuclear Research Center in response to the strikes on Natanz and Bushehr. A strike in Arad wounded 116 people, seven seriously.

=== 22 March ===
==== US–Israeli strikes ====
HRANA recorded 206 attacks in 15 provinces with at least 4 casualties including one civilian killed and three injured. Targets hit included an airbase and naval base in Bushehr, the garrison in Garmdareh, an airbase and two power plants in Bandar Abbas, an army aviation base in Isfahan, residential buildings in Tabriz and Mohammadshahr, and the Shohada-ye Kargar Sports Complex in Masjed Soleyman. Airstrikes took place in several other places throughout Iran, including Ahvaz, Chabahar, Rasht, and Yazd. A powerful early morning explosion in Tehran briefly lit up the sky in the area. Ebrahim Mortazavi-Nasb, a Basij commander, was killed in an airstrike. Buildings were destroyed in an airstrike in the Alborz province.

==== Iranian and Iran-aligned strikes ====
Iranian missile attacks injured 15 people across central Israel. A Hezbollah rocket strike hit a car in Misgav Am, killing a man.

=== 23 March ===
==== US–Israeli strikes ====
HRANA recorded 379 attacks in 20 provinces, and at least 175 casualties including 38 civilians killed and 138 injured. A majority of the day's attacks were carried out on Tehran. Targets hit included an air force base, a gas company and residential buildings in Tehran, bases and garrisons in Garmdareh, Khorramabad and Bushehr, the Shohada-ye Pasdar School in Khorramabad and the Velayat Cultural Center in Shahr-e Rey.

==== Iran-aligned strikes ====
Seven rockets were launched by a pro-Iranian Iraqi militia at a base in the Al-Hasakah Governorate, which was recently vacated by American forces.

==== Other developments ====
President Trump postponed US strikes against Iranian powerplants for five days amid "productive" negotiations. Iran denied Trump's claims about productive conversations and its Foreign Ministry stated that there will be no negotiations until Iran's goals have been achieved. Eyewitnesses in Iran described Basij patrols and security checkpoints stationed overnight throughout the country.

=== 24 March ===
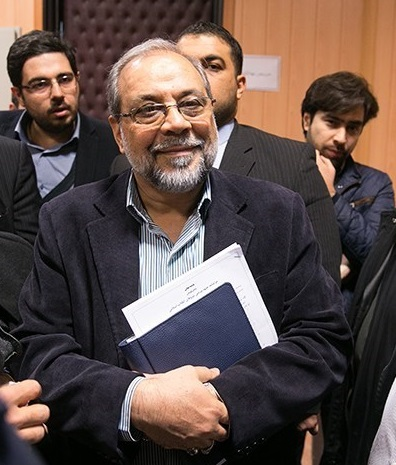
Mohammad Bagher Zolghadr (pictured in 2017) was appointed secretary of the Iranian Supreme National Security Council.

==== US–Israeli strikes ====
HRANA recorded 108 attacks in 10 provinces, and at least 61 casualties including 12 civilians killed and 38 injured. The heaviest strikes were in Khuzestan and Isfahan. Strikes hit missile sites in Tabriz and Borazjan, military industries, a gas company facility and civilian businesses in Isfahan, a gas pipeline in Khorramshahr, a sports complex in Andimeshk, and a Basij base and residential buildings in Tehran. Airstrikes were also reported in Shahin Shahr, Najafabad, the Jowzdan industrial zone, and Bandar Kangan. An overnight US strike on a base in Al Anbar killed at least 15 and injured 30 members of the Iraqi Popular Mobilization Forces. The group announced the death of Saad Dawai, its operations commander in Anbar. A strike also hit the home of PMF leader Falih al-Fayyadh in Mosul.

==== Iranian strikes ====
Iranian missiles were launched at targets in Tel Aviv, Eilat, Dimona and Haifa. Several people were injured. Kuwait reported damage to power lines due to Iranian attacks. Iranian missiles were intercepted over Beirut, resulting in minor injuries. A worker from Morocco was killed and several soldiers injured during an Iranian drone attack on Bahrain.

==== Other developments ====
Iran appointed Mohammad Bagher Zolghadr as secretary of the Supreme National Security Council following the assassination of Ali Larijani.

=== 25 March ===
- Iranian drones set a fuel depot on Kuwait's international airport on fire, while security forces reported that another six drones were intercepted.
- An Iranian missile was intercepted over Jordan, with debris coming down near the capital Amman. The IDF reported at least one rocket intercepted.
- An Iranian missile impacted on a field near Israel's largest powerplant near Hadera. No injuries or damages were reported.
- 11 people in northwestern Iran were killed by airstrikes.
- Two sites in Tehran that produced cruise missiles were destroyed by airstrikes.
- Overnight strikes were reported in numerous Iranian cities, including Chabahar, Nowshahr, and Larestan.
- Israel says it destroyed a naval research center in Isfahan.
- Iran claimed that it had fired Qader cruise missiles against USS Abraham Lincoln. The ship was not harmed.
- Seven Iraqi Army soldiers were killed in a U.S. airstrike near a PMF site in western Anbar, Iraq.

=== 26 March ===
==== US–Israeli strikes ====
- The IDF announced that Navy Commander of the IRGC, Alireza Tangsiri, was killed by a strike in Bandar Abbas. This was later confirmed by the IRGC.
- Iranian media reported two teenagers were killed in Shiraz during an US–Israeli attack on a residential area. Further attacks were reported from Iranian towns of Bandar Abbas, Karaj, Mashhad and Taybad.
- The Lebanese health ministry announced that the death toll from Israeli attacks in Lebanon since the start of the invasion had risen to 1,116.

==== Iranian strikes ====
- Iran claimed to have shot down an F/A-18 over Chabahar. US CENTCOM denied the shootdown, stating that no US aircraft had been hit by Iranian missiles.
- Debris from an intercepted Iranian missile killed two civilians in Abu Dhabi.

==== Other developments ====
- According to the open-source-intelligence investigative journalism group Bellingcat, the US apparently deployed what experts identified as BLU-91/B antitank landmines from a GATOR scatterable mine system over the village of Kafari, located near the southern Iranian city of Shiraz, early in the morning. No party in the war was known to possess the system besides the US, which had not used scatterable antitank landmines in conflict since the Gulf War in 1991 and had last used an antipersonnel mine in a single incident in 2002 during the War in Afghanistan. Photographs and videos of the landmines were posted on social media by state-controlled Islamic Republic of Iran Broadcasting, semi-official Tasnim News Agency, and Canadian independent journalist Dimitri Lascaris, who was accompanied by representatives of the Iranian government. Tasnim News Agency reported that the landmines had caused multiple casualties and published images of them that showed the presence of aeroballistic adapters, indicating that they had been scattered by an aircraft-dropped dispenser. Lascaris said that he had seen four landmines while touring Kafari and posted footage of a bloodstain where witnesses said that a 31-year-old father had been killed by one of the landmines, which are prone to detonating when moved, after picking it up near his vehicle. The landmines may have been deployed in Kafari to prevent vehicles from accessing Shiraz South Missile Base, which was located about two kilometers away from some of the landmines.
- Rahim Nadali, an official from the Iranian Revolutionary Guards Corps, announced the "For Iran" initiative which allows children as young as 12 to be recruited into the IRGC in security-related roles.
- Donald Trump claimed that the Iranian leadership was "begging" for a peace deal and declares opposing Iranian government statements as false and hinted that Iranian negotiators don't go public because they fear their own people.
- Two IDF soldiers of the Golani Brigade were killed in clashes with Hezbollah fighters in southern Lebanon, bringing the total of Israeli soldiers killed since the start of the invasion of Lebanon to four.
- Israeli prime minister Benjamin Netanyahu claimed in mid May 2026 to have met UAE leader Sheikh Mohamed bin Zayed Al Nahyan during a secret visit on 26 March in the remote desert location Al Ain. UAE officials denied the claim.

=== 27 March ===
- IDF reported four missile salvos were fired from Iran on targets in Israel since the early morning, with most being intercepted and the rest causing no casualties.
- Kuwait reported an attack by drones on Shuwaikh Port, and drones and missiles on Mubarak Al Kabeer Port causing material damage but no human casualties.
- UAE authorities reported six ballistic missiles and nine drones from Iran were intercepted.
- Israeli strikes hit the factories of Mobarakeh Steel Company and Khouzestan Steel Company, located respectively in Isfahan and Ahvaz. Israel stated that these facilities were part of Iran's military-industrial complex and were partially controlled by the IRGC. Later, strikes hit a yellowcake plant near Yazd and the IR-40 heavy water reactor in Arak.
- The IDF said that it struck a major missile and naval mine production site in Yazd.
- An Iranian cluster bomb attack impacted six sites across central Israel, killing one person in Ramat Gan and injuring three others.
- An Iranian missile and drone strike on Prince Sultan Air Base damaged several US refueling aircraft and injured fifteen US soldiers, including five critically. An E-3 Sentry was also damaged by the strike. It was also reported that an attack earlier that week injured 14 US soldiers.
- Iran's Ministry of Health claimed that over 230 children had been killed in US–Israeli attacks in the first month of the war.

=== 28 March ===
- A Houthi ballistic missile was launched from Yemen toward Beersheba in Southern Israel after its military spokesman gave a speech. A Houthi cruise missile targeting Israel was intercepted hours later, and a drone from Yemen was intercepted near Eilat.
- Port installations in Salalah in southern Oman were hit by two drones. One worker was reported injured. Iran said that it targeted a logistics vessel belonging to US military in the vicinity of the port.
- Iran said that it targeted a Ukrainian anti-drone system depot in Dubai which it said was used to assist American forces.
- Iranian drones hit Kuwait international airport and damaged its radar system. The fire, which had been burning in the airports fuel depot for 3 days, was finally extinguished.
- The IDF said that it struck the headquarters of the Marine Industries Organization in Tehran alongside other arms manufacturing sites and air defenses.
- A drone attack targeted the home of Kurdistan Region president Nechirvan Barzani in Duhok.
- An overnight strike in Tehran damaged buildings belonging to Iran University of Science and Technology. The IRGC to threatened to attack US universities in the region in response. Later, Israeli strikes reportedly hit a water reservoir in Haftkel and killed Ali Fouladvand, the head of the Organization of Defensive Innovation and Research's research department, in Borujerd, along with members of his family. Fouladvand's death was later confirmed by Iranian media.
- An Iranian ballistic missile strike in Eshtaol injured 19 people and damaged several homes.
- Iranian president Masoud Pezeshkian reportedly clashed with IRGC chief-commander Ahmad Vahidi over how the war was being conducted; he also warned that without a ceasefire, Iran's economy could collapse within three to four weeks. He criticized the IRGC's attacks on neighboring countries and called for restoration of executive powers to the civilian government.
- An Iranian attack struck Emirates Global Aluminium's Al Taweelah site in Abu Dhabi, causing damage. Aluminium Bahrain also announced that it was attacked the day earlier, injuring two people.
- A drone attack from Iraq targeting Syria's al-Tanf military base was intercepted.
- The British navy sends the RFA Lyme Bay, an amphibius ship fitted with mine-hunting drones to the Straits of Hormuz.
- Iran agreed to allow 20 more Pakistani-flagged ships to transit Strait of Hormuz; Islamabad confirmed it.
- An IDF soldier of the Paratroopers Brigade was killed in a Hezbollah rocket attack in southern Lebanon, increasing the number of IDF soldiers killed since the start of the invasion to 5.

=== 29 March ===
- Overnight drone attacks in Erbil, Iraq, targeted the home of Kurdistan Democratic Party leader Masoud Barzani, Iranian opposition headquarters, and a US base near Erbil International Airport.
- Explosions were reported in many places in Iran including Abad, Andisheh, District 15, Evin, Masoudieh, Nobonyad, Qaleh Hasan Khan, and Saadat.
- Israel said it struck mobile command centers and places used to produce weapons in Tehran.
- Iranian parliament speaker Mohammad Bagher Ghalibaf rejected the ongoing negotiations with the United States, saying that Iran could not be forced into submission.
- An Iranian missile struck an ADAMA chemical facility in Ne'ot Hovav, injuring one person.
- Six people killed in US–Israeli attack on Iranian village; Five houses were destroyed, and 22 were severely damaged in the attack.
- Power was cut in parts of Tehran and Alborz province, including Karaj, after electrical infrastructure was damaged by shrapnel.
- The International Atomic Energy Agency said that the IR-40 heavy water reactor was no longer operational after sustaining serious damage during the Israeli attack on 27 March.
- Late on 29 March Iranian drones hit a military installation in Kuwait injuring 10 soldiers.
- Explosions and strikes were reported in many places in Iran, including Kish Island, Qeshm Island, and Bandar Abbas in Hormozgan province, in Babol in Mazandaran province, in Dehgolan in Kurdistan province, and in Tabriz in East Azarbaijan province.

=== 30 March ===
Avatar of Donald J. Trump

Donald J. Trump
(@realDonaldTrump)
tweeted:

English:

The United States of America is in serious discussions with A NEW, AND MORE REASONABLE, REGIME to end our Military Operations in Iran. Great progress has been made but, if for any reason a deal is not shortly reached, which it probably will be, and if the Hormuz Strait is not immediately “Open for Business,” we will conclude our lovely “stay” in Iran by blowing up and completely obliterating all of their Electric Generating Plants, Oil Wells and Kharg Island (and possibly all desalinization plants!), which we have purposefully not yet “touched.” This will be in retribution for our many soldiers, and others, that Iran has butchered and killed over the old Regime’s 47 year “Reign of Terror.” Thank you for your attention to this matter. President DONALD J. TRUMP

March 30, 2026

White House press secretary Karoline Leavitt in a March 2026 media briefing

- Alleged Iranian drones hit a power plant and a desalination plant in Kuwait, caused damage to buildings and killed one worker. Iran accused the Israeli government of attacking the plant, without providing evidence.
- Debris from an intercepted missile struck the BAZAN oil refinery in Haifa, hitting a fuel tanker and damaging a nearby roof.
- The IDF said that it struck an IRGC weapons research and testing site at Imam Hossein University in Tehran.
- An Iranian missile was shot down by NATO air defenses over Turkish airspace. Iran denied firing missile at Turkey, saying that it was a false flag attack.
- The US began using for the first time B-52 bombers, over Iranian territory.

=== 31 March ===
Avatar of Donald J. Trump

Donald J. Trump
(@realDonaldTrump)
tweeted:

English:

All of those countries that can’t get jet fuel because of the Strait of Hormuz, like the United Kingdom, which refused to get involved in the decapitation of Iran, I have a suggestion for you: Number 1, buy from the U.S., we have plenty, and Number 2, build up some delayed courage, go to the Strait, and just TAKE IT. You’ll have to start learning how to fight for yourself, the U.S.A. won’t be there to help you anymore, just like you weren’t there for us. Iran has been, essentially, decimated. The hard part is done. Go get your own oil! President DJT

March 31, 2026

- A power outage in much of Eastern Tehran was caused by rubble hitting a power substation.
- Heavy airstrikes were reported in the Vardavard neighborhood in western Tehran.
- The US dropped bunker buster bombs on an underground ammunition depot in Isfahan.
- The fully loaded crude oil tanker Al Salmi (IMO 9534793) was hit by an alleged Iranian drone on its starboard side near Dubai Port and caught fire.
- IDF reported three Iranian missile attacks on Israel. Damage by cluster bombs was done in Bnei Brak, Ramat Gan and Petah Tikva, eight people were reported injured.
- The Mobarakeh Steel Company factory in Isfahan was hit by airstrikes.
- The IDF said that it struck a factory owned by the Tofiq Daru Company that was used to produce and supply substances such as fentanyl to the Organization of Defensive Innovation and Research for use in Iran's alleged chemical weapons program. Iran denied Israeli claims, saying that fentanyl factory was only supplying hospital drugs.
- A second tanker, Aqua 1 (IMO 9573660), was reported to have been hit late on 31 March by projectiles on its port side 17 nmi north of Dubai. One exploded above waterline, causing a minor fire, while the other one failed to explode and got lodged in the engine room area.
- The IDF said that it killed the commander of the Quds Force Lebanon Corps' engineering branch in an airstrike in Mahallat, adding that he led the construction of dozens of underground structures for Hezbollah and the Assad regime.
- Iran confirmed the death of brigadier general Jamshid Eshaghi, who led the Iranian General Staff's budgeting and financial affairs and was killed alongside members of his family.

== April ==
=== 1 April ===
- A fuel storage at Kuwait International Airport was hit by Iranian drones, causing a major fire.
- Israel reported four missile barrages fired from Iran, with impacts of cluster munition reported from Bnei Brak and Tel Aviv, injuring 14 people.
- IDF reported a missile launched by Houthi militias was intercepted.
- Several waves of drones targeted a factory which produced motor oils in Erbil Iraq, causing a major fire.
- A US strike in Tehran reportedly damaged the former US embassy, which was converted into a museum following its takeover during the Iranian Revolution. The St. Nicholas Orthodox Church was also damaged.
- A claim by Donald Trump that the Iranian president asked for a ceasefire was rejected by Iran as "false and baseless".
- Two US MQ-9 Reaper drones were shot down by Iran near Isfahan, bringing the total number of MQ-9s lost during the war to 16.
- Iranian outlet Nournews reported that former foreign minister Kamal Kharazi was seriously injured and his wife was killed in an airstrike which hit his home.
- Mohammad Ali Fathalizadeh, commander of the IRGC's Fatehin unit, was killed by an airstrike.
- US president Donald Trump delivered a speech stating the war's objectives were "nearing completion," projecting it could last a few more weeks, and threatening to bomb Iran "back to the stone age" if it did not agree to reopen the Strait of Hormuz and ease disruptions to global energy markets.

=== 2 April ===
- The IDF said that it struck an IRGC Ground Forces base and mobile command centers in Tehran. Two US strikes on the Karaj B1 bridge between Tehran and Karaj, which was described as the highest bridge in the Middle East, reportedly killed eight people and caused it to collapse.
- Iraq began exporting crude by tanker trucks through Syria to Mediterranean ports such as Baniyas.
- Buildings of the Pasteur Institute of Iran were destroyed by an air attack.
- A fuel tank near Mashhad International Airport was struck by a projectile, sparking a fire.
- An Iranian strike targeted an Amazon cloud computing facility in Bahrain, causing a fire. Iran also said it attacked US fighter jets at Jordan's Al Azraq Air Base with drones. The IRGC later said that it targeted an Oracle data center in Dubai, although the city denied this.
- The IDF said that it killed the commander of Iran's ballistic missiles unit in Kermanshah and three other battalion commanders.
- An Iranian ballistic missile strike damaged an Israeli drone factory in Petah Tikva.

=== 3 April ===
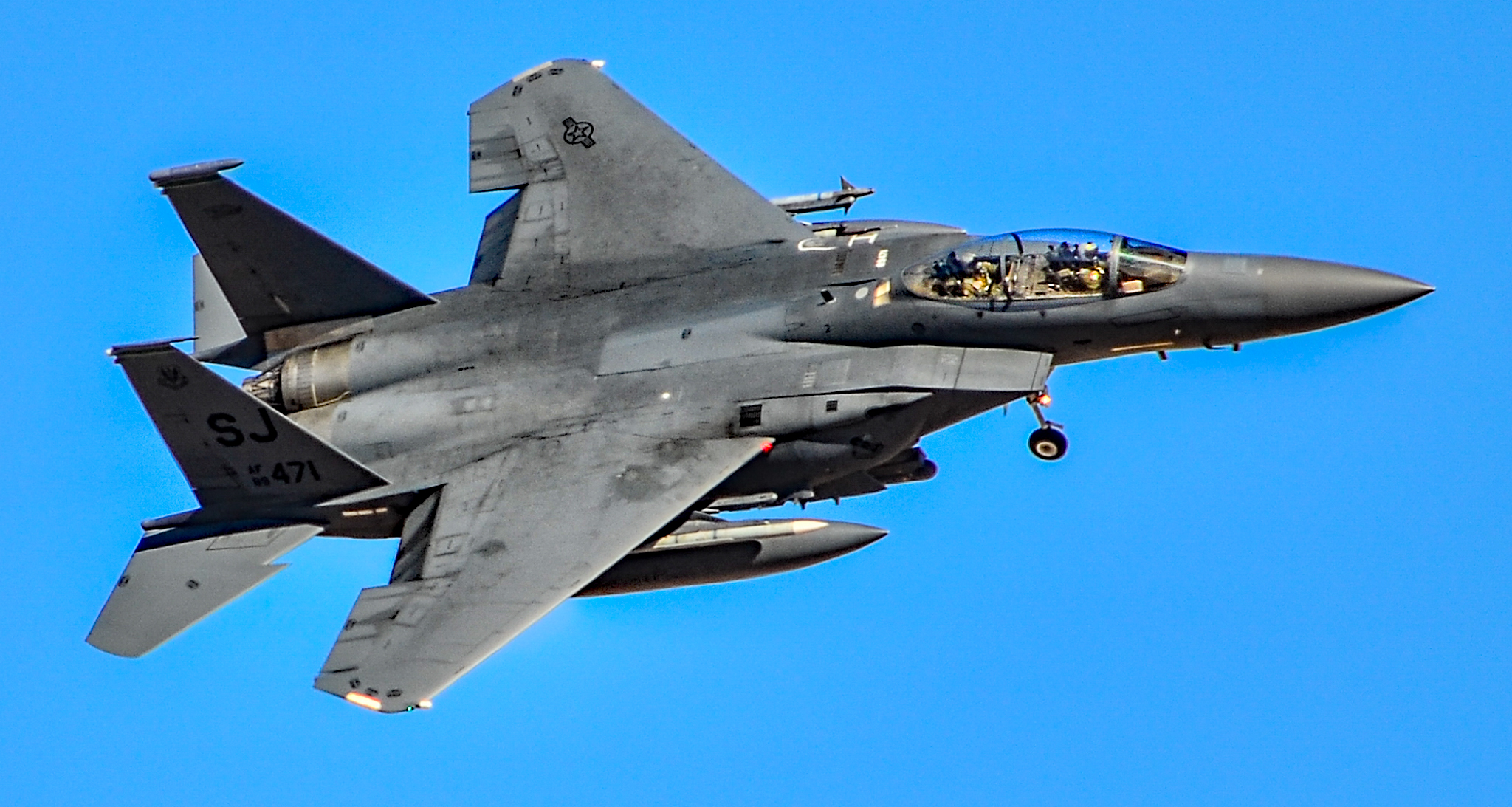
A US-crewed McDonnell Douglas F-15E Strike Eagle (example pictured) was shot down over Iran.

- Iranian drones hit the Mina Al-Ahmadi refinery in Kuwait and set it on fire in multiple locations.
- Explosions were reported in many places across Iran, including Alborz, Bushehr, Fars, Isfahan, Khuzestan, and Tehran.
- Kuwait authorities reported Iranian drones damaged a desalination plant.
- Abu Dhabi media office reported debris from an interception caused a fire in the Habshan gas facility. An Egyptian citizen was killed and four other foreign nationals were injured by interception debris.
- Iranian forces shot down a US Air Force F-15E Strike Eagle fighter jet over the country, prompting a search and rescue mission by US helicopters. Both of the two crew members were rescued by US forces. Two US MC-130 Hercules, an A-10 aircraft and 4 helicopters were destroyed in the operation.
- A US A-10 Warthog crashed into the Persian Gulf, near the Strait of Hormuz. The pilot was rescued.
- Iranian cluster munitions caused extensive damage in Kiryat Ata and injured one person.
- Israel claims to have killed Iranian missile commander Makram Azimi in Kermanshah province.
- The Israeli government extended operational reserve duty for current and future reservists to approximately nine weeks.
- Emirates Global Aluminium reported that an Iranian attack on its plant in Abu Dhabi caused significant damage and may take up to a year to restore its full production.
- Iranian media reported that Iran executed two men linked to Mojahedin-e-Khalq for planning to carry out attacks across the country.
- Israel says it killed Mohammadreza Ashrafi, senior IRGC official responsible for the oil headquarters.

=== 4 April ===
- Iranian missile attacks on Israel with cluster munitions damaging buildings and roads were reported from Bnei Brak, Ramat Gan, Tel Aviv and Petah Tikva. One of those cluster bombs hit in the vicinity of the IDF's Kirya headquarters in Tel Aviv. The home of United Torah Judaism leader Moshe Gafni in Bnei Brak was also hit by a cluster munition.
- Iranian media reported an air attack on a cement factory in Bandar Khamir.
- A strike hit a building near the Bushehr Nuclear Power Plant in Iran, killing one of its security guards. Israeli strikes also hit petrochemical sites in Khuzestan province, injuring five people. Iranian press reported US–Israeli strikes did hit the Bandar-e Mahshahr and Bandar Imam petrochemical zones as well as petrochemical industries in Fajr, Rejal, and Amir-Kabir. Five people were killed and 170 others were injured in the strikes in Mahshahr, according to Iranian media.
- Iran claimed that it struck the container ship MSC Ishyka with a drone in the Strait of Hormuz, alleging that it was linked to Israel. The attack was not independently verified.
- An airstrike hit the Iranian side of the Shalamcheh border crossing, killing an Iraqi citizen and seriously injuring five others. Iraq closed the crossing in response.

=== 5 April ===
- After heavy fighting, the missing weapon systems officer (WSO) from the downed F-15E was successfully recovered by US commandos. The temporary US forward operating base in Iran, established to rescue the WSO, was evacuated and two C-130s and at least one MH-6 Little Bird were left behind and destroyed by the retreating US forces.
- Explosions and overhead flights were reported overnight in many provinces, including Alborz, Boyer-Ahmad, Bushehr, Fars, Gilan, Hormozgan, Isfahan, Khuzestan, Kohgiluyeh, and Mazandaran.
- Iranian drones hit a BAPCO oil storage facility in Bahrain and set it on fire. Further drone attacks hit the Shuwaikh Oil Sector Complex and a desalination plant in Kuwait.
- The IDF said that it killed Mohammad Reza Ashrafi Kahi, who was the Head of Commerce at the IRGC Oil Headquarters.
- An Iranian missile strike hit a residential building in Haifa, killing four people. Nine people were injured in the attack, one seriously.
- Iran announced that the number of attacks on civilian centers in Israeli and American attacks (on Iran) was: 83,351 residential units. Also, 322 medical centers and 763 schools (in Iran) have been attacked so far.

=== 6 April ===
US president Donald Trump on 6 April 2026

- An Iranian missile barrage early in the morning impacted 15 areas, seriously injuring a woman in Petah Tikva and injuring two others in Tel Aviv. Four people were lightly wounded by a cluster bomb in Haifa.
- An airstrike hit two homes in Baharestan County, Tehran province, killing 23 people. Overnight strikes in Bandar Lengeh and Kong killed six people and injured 17 others. Five others were killed in Qom. Tehran's Sharif University of Technology was also struck.
- Debris from a missile interception fell on a Raneen Systems building in Mussafah, UAE, injuring a Ghanaian.
- Explosions and attacks in the early morning were reported at a military site in northern Iran and in Khorramshahr.
- IRGC intelligence chief Majid Khademi was killed in an American-Israeli airstrike. Israel also said that it killed Yazdan Mir, the commander of the Quds Force's Unit 840.
- Iran said that it targeted US satellite equipment and munitions on Bubiyan Island, Kuwait using drones.
- Four bodies were found during a search and rescue operation on a destroyed house hit by an Iranian missile in Haifa the day before.
- Israeli Minister of Defense Israel Katz said that the IDF struck Iran's most prominent petrochemical plant in Asaluyeh, causing major damage.
- The IDF said that it struck Mehrabad International Airport and two smaller airfields, destroying dozens of Iranian airplanes and helicopters.
- Iraqi security sources said that two people were killed after an Iranian drone strike on the village of Zarka Zoy, in the Darashakran district of Erbil Governorate.
- 15 Americans were wounded in an overnight Iranian drone strike on Ali Al Salem Air Base.
- Trump threatened to send Iran 'back to the Stone Ages' if it does not reach a deal by the ultimatum he set.
- Up to 6 April, as a result of the US and Israeli attacks, damage(s) has also been done to sports federations and sports infrastructure in Iran. Among the damages are the following: the complete destruction of the 12,000-seat Azadi Hall, the camp of the national wrestling teams of the Iran, various parts of the Shooting Federation, parts of the Tennis Federation, the Hockey Federation building located in the Tehran Revolution Sports Complex, and the cycling and handball federations in Iran.

=== 7 April ===
Avatar of Donald J. Trump

Donald J. Trump
(@realDonaldTrump)
tweeted:

English:

A whole civilization will die tonight, never to be brought back again. I don’t want that to happen, but it probably will. However, now that we have Complete and Total Regime Change, where different, smarter, and less radicalized minds prevail, maybe something revolutionarily wonderful can happen, WHO KNOWS? We will find out tonight, one of the most important moments in the long and complex history of the World. 47 years of extortion, corruption, and death, will finally end. God Bless the Great People of Iran!

April 7, 2026

- Iranian drones hit a SABIC petrochemical complex in Jubail in Saudi Arabia, causing a fire.
- Overnight strikes were reported in the greater Tehran area, in Ahvaz, Chabahar, Jask, Shiraz, and Yazd, and near the Shahid Kalantari port, Tis port, and the Imam Ali base.
- The Rafi'-Nia synagogue in central Tehran was destroyed in an airstrike. The IDF admitted to conducting the strike, stating that it targeted a commander in the Khatam al-Anbiya Central Headquarters and regretted damage to the synagogue.
- The US said that it conducted strikes against military sites on Kharg Island, with Iranian media reporting several large explosions.
- A highway bridge connecting Hashtrud and Tabriz and a rail bridge in Kashan was hit in an airstrike, killing two people. The IDF later said that it bombed eight bridges across Iran used to transport military equipment.
- At least five people were killed after a rocket fired from Kuwait landed in Basra, southern Iraq.
- Iran distributes 180,000 iodine tablets to Bushehr residents as part of a crisis preparedness plan.
- Trump said he agreed to a two-week ceasefire with Iran in exchange for the immediate reopening of the Strait of Hormuz.
- Pakistani prime minister Shehbaz Sharif announced an immediate ceasefire "everywhere, including Lebanon and elsewhere".

=== 8 April ===
- Israeli prime minister Benjamin Netanyahu announced on social media that the ceasefire does not include Lebanon.
- Early morning, Iranian agencies reported explosions from Sirri Island and Lavan Island of unknown origin. The strike on Lavan island was later attributed to the UAE by press research from The Wall Street Journal in mid May 2026.
- Iranian missiles and drones were intercepted over the UAE, and Iranian drones also targeted energy infrastructure and desalination plants in Kuwait, causing serious damage. Two people were injured by shrapnel in Sitra, Bahrain.
- The Israeli air force launched the biggest wave of attacks against targets in Lebanon since the beginning of the conflict, hitting more than 100 sites. At least 254 people were killed and 837 injured. Hezbollah claimed responsibility for launching rockets towards north Israel as a response to "cease-fire violations".
- Iranian media said that Iran paused Hormuz traffic over Israeli attacks in Lebanon.
- Masoud Pezeshkian said the ceasefire with the United States was broken as Lavan and Siri islands were bombed.
- Donald Trump claimed after the Israeli air assault on Lebanon, that the Pakistani Prime Minister's announcement of the peace deal was wrong and Israeli interpretation of the deal was correct and Lebanon was excluded. Iranian news agency Tasnim on the other hand reported that Iran will withdraw from the agreement if Israel attacks on Lebanon continue. US vice president JD Vance stated that there had been a "legitimate misunderstanding" about the inclusion of Lebanon, with Israel having promised to hold back a bit in Lebanon to help with the negotiations, but it was not part of the ceasefire.

=== 9 April ===
- Kuwait announced that it was intercepting a drone attack on its territory that was targeting vital institutions. The Kuwait National Guard later announced that one of its sites were attacked, causing damage. Iran denied responsibility.
- The US said that an Iran-backed militia conducted drone attacks near the Baghdad Diplomatic Support Center and Baghdad International Airport.
- Former Iranian foreign minister Kamal Kharazi succumbed to wounds sustained by an airstrike on his home nine days prior.
- The 40th-day commemoration of the passing of the former leader of the Islamic Republic of Iran, Ali Khamenei, was held with the participation of people and groups of mourners from inside and outside the country.

=== 10 April ===
- According to Iranian media Mehr News Agency, till 10 April 2026, 203 Iranian sports venues, including indoor arenas, swimming pools, artificial turf fields, and office buildings, have been damaged in US–Israeli attacks, with damage levels estimated to range from 2 to 100 percent.

=== 11 April ===
- Trump said that American forces started "clearing" the Strait of Hormuz. Iran claimed that an American vessel on way to the strait turned back after warning. The Wall Street Journal reported that several US Navy destroyers entered the Strait of Hormuz for the first time since the war began. A US official described the event as an "operation that focused on freedom of navigation through International waters". Iranian government reportedly threatened to attack the ships, accusing US of ceasefire violation. US Central Command said the ships are taking part in mine clearance operations.

=== 12 April ===
- Early morning, local time in Islamabad, after some 20 hours of negotiations, US vice president JD Vance stated that Iranian negotiators did not accept the terms the US representatives JD Vance, Jared Kushner and Steve Witkoff had laid out and that the talks have failed.
- On his social media platform, Trump declared a naval blockade on the Strait of Hormuz, announcing that the US Navy will prevent ships from entering or exiting the Strait and intercept vessels that have paid tolls to Iran. United States Central Command announced that the blockade will be enforced on vessels of all nations entering or departing Iranian ports and coastal areas but "will not impede freedom of navigation for vessels transiting the Strait of Hormuz to and from non-Iranian ports."

=== 13 April ===
- According to Donald Trump, the US Naval blockade of Iran was due to start at 13 April 10:00 a.m. ET (2:00 p.m. UTC).

=== 14 April ===
- The director of the Hind Rajab Foundation, reported that Daniel Ella, commander of the 52nd Battalion of the 401st Brigade which was involved in the killing of Hind Rajab, was seriously injured in southern Lebanon.
- Iran was reported to have been digging underground to retrieve missile launchers.

=== 15 April ===
- Donald Trump declared he is permanently opening the Strait of Hormuz.

=== 16 April ===
- China's foreign minister Wang Yi told his Iranian counterpart, that opening the Strait of Hormuz was of "unanimous interest".

=== 17 April ===
- Iranian foreign minister announced that passage of commercial vessels through the Strait of Hormuz would be permitted during the truce in Lebanon.

=== 18 April ===
- Iran said that it reasserted control of Hormuz as a result of the US refusing to lift its naval blockade.
- UKMTO reported two Iranian gunboats opened fire on a tanker that tried to pass through the Strait of Hormuz.

=== 19 April ===
- An explosive device was detonated in southern Lebanon, killing an Israeli soldier and injuring nine others.
- An announcement by Donald Trump of a new round of talks in Islamabad is dismissed as false by Iran's Tasnim News Agency based on informed sources.
- The US intercepted an Iranian cargo ship in the Strait of Hormuz. Iran claimed this was a 'ceasefire violation' and promised a response. Iran retaliated against the seizure by firing drones at US ships, although no damage was reported.

=== 21 April ===
- Donald Trump extended the Iran truce to allow time for an Iranian proposal to be submitted at Pakistan's request.

=== 22 April ===
- Iranian Revolutionary Guards gunboats engaged three container vessels, the Epaminodes (IMO 9153862), Euphoria (IMO 9235828) and MSC-Francesca (IMO 9401116) in the Strait of Hormuz. Epaminodes and MSC-Francesca were seized and escorted to the coast of Iran, claiming safety violations. Euphoria reported heavy damage to the bridge by gun and rocketfire from Iranian gunboats.

=== 23 April ===
- Trump ordered the US Navy to destroy any Iranian boats laying mines in the Hormuz.
- President Trump announced that Israel and Lebanon agreed to a three-week extension of the ceasefire.
- Tasnim reported that Iranian security forces destroyed a People's Fighters Front (PFF) operational cell, with several militants there that previously infiltrated the Pakistani border to Rask said to be killed by the Iranian news agency.

=== 24 April ===
- Iran said that it confiscated a vessel suspected of collaborating with American forces after the vessel committed violations and ignored warnings.
- Kuwait's defense ministry reported that two northern Kuwaiti border outposts were struck by fiber optic drones from Iraq, causing material damage but no casualties.

== May ==
=== 3 May ===
- Trump announced that the US will help free up ships in the Strait of Hormuz beginning the next morning.

=== 4 May ===
- US Central Command announced two US-flagged ships, coming from the Gulf, passed the Strait of Hormuz unchallenged, while two US warships passed from the east.
- Two civilian ship reported attacks near the Strait of Hormuz, South Korean container vessel HMM Namu was damaged near Umm Al Quwain, while a tanker reported an incident near Dubai.
- Iranian state media claimed that the Iran's navy launched two missiles and hit an US naval frigate in the Strait of Hormuz. US Central Command denied that the projectiles struck the vessel.
- American forces reportedly destroyed six or seven small Iranian boats in the Strait of Hormuz during a clash. The boats were destroyed after they allegedly tried to interfere with the transit of two US flagged commercial vessels and two Navy destroyer vessels (USS Truxtun and USS Mason).
- UAE officials state that Iran attacked the oil Industry Zone in the port of Fujairah with drones, setting several storage tanks on fire and injuring several workers. Four missiles were also launched by Iran according to the UAE, but those were destroyed. The Fujairah port is used to export oil without having to use the Strait of Hormuz. Omani officials also reported Iranian strikes in their territory.

=== 5 May ===
- UAE's ministry of defence stated the country was again defending against a barrage of Iranian missiles and drones.
- The CMA CGM line stated that one of their freighters, CMA GGM San Antonio, was attacked in the Strait of Hormuz late on 5 May. Several crewmembers were injured and were evacuated for treatment.

=== 6 May ===
- President Trump temporary stopped the US military's "Project Freedom" operation to reopen the Strait of Hormuz, citing "great progress" at a potential deal with Iran. Trump added that the operation will be halted for "a short period" to determine whether a "complete and final agreement" with Iran could be achieved.
- US Central Command stated that US aircraft used cannon fire to disable the rudder on the Iranian tanker MT Hasna because it had tried to break the blockade and reach Iran.

=== 7 May ===
- The US said that it carried out strikes on Iranian military sites in Bandar Abbas and Qeshm Island in response to an earlier combined missile, drone, and small boat attack on American destroyers crossing the Strait of Hormuz. Iran accused the US of violating the truce by targeting an Iranian oil tanker and another vessel. It also claimed that the US air strikes hit civilian areas in Qeshm Island, and coastal areas in its vicinity in Bandar Khamir and Sirik. The military said it targeted American military vessels east of the Strait of Hormuz and south of the Chabahar Port in response to these events.
- The UAE said that its air defense systems intercepted two Iranian ballistic missiles and three drones, moderately wounding three people.
- The US said that it conducted strikes on two empty oil tankers allegedly trying to reach Iran.
- Iranian officials stated that six individuals went missing and several others were wounded in US attacks which hit "Iranian fishing and cargo vessels" in the vicinity of Khasab.

=== 8 May ===
- Iranian state TV reported that the tanker Ocean Koi (IMO 9255933) was seized by Iranian forces.
- US Central Command reported it fired on and disabled Iranian tankers MT Sea Star III and MT Sevda running the blockade.

=== 9 May ===
- Security forces in Bahrain arrested 41 people, accused of conducting espionage on behalf of the Iranian IRGC.

=== 10 May ===
- UAE and Kuwait reported drone incursions which were neutralized, and a fire allegedly broke out on a ship off Qatar after a drone strike.

=== 13 May ===
- The Indian-flagged small freighter Haji Ali reported to have been stricken by a drone or missile off the coast of Oman and sank. All 14 crewmembers were rescued by Omani authorities.

=== 14 May ===
- UKMTO reported unauthorized personnel seized an unidentified ship 38 nautical miles (70 km; 44 mi) off Fujairah and moved it towards Iran. The ship was later identified as the Honduras-flagged Hui Chuan, which apparently functioned as a floating armory, storing weapons for PMC's.

=== 17 May ===
- A drone strike caused a fire at the edge of the UAE's Barakah nuclear power plant. No injuries or radiation leaks were reported.
- The Iranian police chief, Ahmad-Reza Radan, has said that more than 6,500 "traitors and spies" have been arrested since the start of the war.

=== 18 May ===
- The New York Times reported that the IDF operated two "covert" outposts in Iraq's western desert and killed a shepherd and a soldier in a bid to hide one of the sites near the town of al-Nukhaib.

=== 22 May ===
- Qatar assumed a mediator role in the war, despite suffering Iranian attacks. However, Pakistan remained the primary mediator.

=== 24 May ===
- Iranian media reported that the Iranian military intercepted an Israeli Orbiter surveillance drone in its Hormozgan province. Israel said that it was unaware of any such incident.

=== 25 May ===
- Iranian president Masoud Pezeshkian ordered to end the internet blackout.
- The US Central Command reported "self-defense" strikes on Iran, saying that the ceasefire is still in place, with several Iranian soldiers reportedly killed. Qatari news broadcaster Al Jazeera reported that unnamed Iranian sources informed them, that the IRGC targeted a ship at sea before the US attacks.

=== 26 May ===
- Israeli troops move north of the Litani river in Lebanon and fights are reported in Zawtar al-Sharqiyah. IDF reported 100 strikes in the Beqaa Valley.

=== 27 May ===
- US forces conducted another attack at a base on Iran's southern coastline. Iranian forces launched several drones, four of which were allegedly intercepted.

=== 28 May ===
- Kuwait downed a ballistic missile launched at its territory. Iran said that it targeted the American base in Kuwait responsible for the attack on the previous day. Bloomberg News reported, citing a person familiar with the incident that debris from the downed Fateh-110 missile fell on Ali Al Salem Air Base, slightly injuring roughly five American soldiers and contractors and destroying one US MQ-9 Reaper drone and causing serious damage to at least one more.

== June ==
=== 1 June ===
- After increased US strikes on Iran and Israeli attacks in Lebanon, Iran announced to end all peace talks with the US.
- Israel promised not to hit Beirut's southern suburbs, and Hezbollah pledged not to attack Israel as part of a US proposal, with the cease-fire framework to be expanded to include the entirety of Lebanon.

=== 2 June ===
- US forces attacked the tanker M/T Lexie while it was en route to Kharg Island, after it ignored orders to stay away from Iran. The ship was hit by a missile, intended to disable it.

=== 3 June ===
- Kuwait International Airport was hit by an Iranian drone, killing one and injuring 63.

=== 7 June ===
- Israeli forces did strike the southern suburbs of Lebanon's capital Beirut. Lebanese state media said that an Israeli strike in the southern suburbs of Beirut killed two people and wounded 11 others. The IDF said that it targeted Hezbollah infrastructure after the group fired towards northern Israel. The same day, Iran said that American bases and Israeli assets in Middle East are legitimate targets due to the American naval blockade against the country and Israeli strikes on Beirut's southern suburbs, where neighborhoods that Hezbollah members live in are located. Iran later launched ballistic missiles towards Israel. Israel said that it downed all the missiles. Iran said that it targeted Ramat David Airbase. Israel said that it will retaliate "forcefully" to the alleged Iranian violation of the truce. The next day, the IDF announced that it struck military sites in central and western Iran, with explosions being reported in Tehran, Isfahan, and Tabriz. This triggered an exchange of strikes between the two countries. The Houthis also joined the strikes. Two Iranian soldiers were killed in an Israeli attack. Iran later says that it had ceased military actions against Israel. Israel later announces that it stopped Iran strikes at President Trump's request.
- Iranian military forces attack People's Fighters Front militants in Saravan, resulting in the deaths of four PFF fighters and one IRGC soldier.

=== 9 June ===
- A US Army AH-64 Apache attack helicopter crashed off the coast of Oman after a collision with an Iranian Shahed drone. Trump blamed Iran and pledged retaliation; Iran denied the collision was intentional. The crew was rescued by a Saronic Technologies sea drone, reportedly the first US Navy search-and-rescue operation with a sea drone. CENTCOM said the incident was under investigation.
- CENTCOM subsequently said that it launched retaliatory strikes against Iran.

=== 10 June ===
- Iran said that it launched strikes aimed at US Fifth Fleet, Ali Al Salem airbase and launched missiles towards American base in Jordan housing F-35s in retaliation to the US strikes.
- President Trump pledged to attack Iran "very hard", citing inadequate progress in war-ending negotiations. US ‌defense secretary Pete Hegseth said that the United States will strike Iran hard on ‌10 June and bomb "key facilities." The US military later launched strikes on multiple Iranian targets, firing 49 Tomahawk missiles during the process.
- US forces attacked the tanker M/T Settebello (IMO 9162916) killing three Indian crew members. The US stated the crew had failed to comply with orders from American forces.
- Drinking water facilities in Bemani, near the Strait of Hormuz, were damaged amid precision US strikes near the Strait. A local official reported that some 20,000 people lost access to water.

=== 11 June ===
- Iran declared the indefinite closure of the Strait of Hormuz and says that it fired at communication antennas and radar facilities of US 5th Fleet, American military bases in Kuwait and Bahrain and an American command center in Jordan in response to the US attacks.
- Iranian attacks hit a key radar station on Bahrains highest mountain Jabal al Dukhan. Press research done by the Neue Zürcher Zeitung from mid June confirmed that the installation had been damaged.

=== 14 June ===
- Israel attacked the Dahiyeh district in Beirut, allegedly responding to a drone attack on targets in Israel earlier.

=== 17 June ===
- Trump and Iranian President Masoud Pezeshkian signed the Islamabad Memorandum to end the war, which Trump signed while dining with French President Emmanuel Macron at the Palace of Versailles following the G7 summit.

=== 21 June ===
- The first talks between the U.S. and Iran since the signing of the Islamabad Memorandum are held at the Bürgenstock Resort in Switzerland. The talks were mediated by Pakistan and Qatar.
- Five known ships pass through the Strait of Hormuz, down from 26 ships the previous day, amidst the re-closure.

=== 26 June ===
- Trump accused Iran of violating the truce with US by launching drone attacks on ships in the Hormuz. CENTCOM later announced that in retaliation to the alleged truce violations, the US hit Iranian missile and drone storage facilities, as well as coastal radar stations. Iran later stated it targeted American sites in the Gulf region in response to the attack.

=== 27 June ===
- The US military announced it struck Iranian military surveillance infrastructure, communication systems, air defense sites, drone storage facilities, and minelayer capabilities at the commander-in-chief's direction in retaliation to an alleged Iranian attack against a ship in the Hormuz.

=== 28 June ===
- Iran said it fired ballistic missiles and drones towards the US Ali Al Salem Air Base in Kuwait and the US Fifth Fleet headquarters in Bahrain in retaliation to American attacks against five Iranian coastal sites.
- IRGC forces and Kurdistan Free Life Party (PAK) militants clash at Gagesh Heights, resulting in the deaths of four PAK members.
- The U.S. and Iran later agreed to stop exchange of attacks between them.

== July ==
=== 1 July ===
- IRGC soldiers ambush a Democratic Party of Iranian Kurdistan (KDPI) vehicle near Piranshahr, killing six KDPI militants.

=== 7 July ===
- Iran reportedly launched at least two missiles at commercial vessels including Al Rekayyat, a liquefied natural gas tanker owned by Nakilat QGTS.QA, part of Qatari LNG industry in the Hormuz, causing significant damage. Iranian state TV reported that one of those vessels was struck after ignoring warning, without directly claiming responsibility. Qatar accused Iran of carrying the attack against its gas tanker, describing it as a clear violation of international law. On the same day, the UK military said that another tanker in the Hormuz was hit by an unidentified projectile. Americans announced that they revoked Iran oil sale and production deal in retaliation to the alleged Iranian attacks. Saudis condemned alleged Iranian attacks against one of their tankers and the Qatari tanker. Iran accused the US of violating the memorandum that ended the war with restoration of the oil sanctions.

=== 8 July ===
- The US Central Command announced that the US struck over 80 Iranian targets including air defense systems, coastal radar sites and dozens of IRGC small boats to degrade Iranian capability to disrupt international maritime trade using precision munitions in retaliation to alleged Iranian truce violations. Iran said that it shot down an American MQ-9 drone in southern Iran. On the same day, Iran announced that it targeted 85 American military targets in Bahrain, Kuwait in retaliation to alleged truce breaches. Iran later added that it targeted an American base in Bahrain. IRGC Navy announced that one of its soldiers was killed in a US drone attack. The same day, Trump declared that the MOU with Iran is "over" after Iran launched attacks on commercial vessels in the Strait of Hormuz to claim Iranian sovereignty over the Strait of Hormuz, startling US officials and shattering a brief diplomatic calm, adding that he did not want to continue dealing with the Iranian regime, which he referred to as “sick people.” (Note: Iranian hardliners undermined the peace agreement by launching the attacks in defiance of leaders.) He emphasized the need to "rid their cancer," advocating for early intervention akin to cutting out cancer. On the same day, Trump secretly left Air Force One for a military jet via a catering container due to a threat from Iran. (Note: The CIA had "low confidence" in the Iranian threat before Trump switched planes in Turkey. A former official stated that the incident "fit a broader pattern of Israeli intelligence reporting that some officials see as designed as much to shape presidential decision-making as to inform it.") Trump later stated that US negotiators can continue negotiations, although he expressed pessimism about the outcome. Iranian state media announced that eight service members from the country's army were killed in American attacks, adding that they served in the air force and navy and died because of attacks ‌in Bandar Abbas and Bushehr. The US Central Command announced that it hit roughly 90 Iranian military targets, including air defense systems, coastal surveillance assets, missile and drone storage facilities, naval capabilities, and military logistics infrastructure along the country's coastline.

=== 9 July ===
- The IRGC said that it targeted two American bases in Kuwait and two in Bahrain. On the same day, Trump said that Iran contacted him and they want to make an agreement. The same day, the Iranian army said that it targeted American military sites in Kuwait, Qatar and Bahrain. Iran's Health Ministry said that 14 people were killed and 78 others were injured in American attacks in Iran. Iran accused the US of targeting civilian railway bridges in its strikes and described the Trump administration as "evil and psychopathic." Fars News Agency reported that the targeted bridges include a bridge on the China-Russia trade corridor in Golestan province, making it one of the deepest US strikes inside Iran since the war began, extending the target list beyond military sites in the south to trade infrastructure that the Iranian regime has relied on to circumvent sanctions and maintain overland links with China and Russia. Iranian media reported explosions in Bushehr, claiming the area around the nuclear power plant was affected. American officials denied the claim, raising chance of involvement by a Gulf state. Iran said that it targeted Muwaffaq Salti Air Base. Iran also conducted drone strikes against an Iranian-Kurdish rebel group in the vicinity of Erbil, Iraq. Iranian state media reported that three IRGC soldiers were killed in the American attacks.

=== 11 July ===
- The IRGC Navy said that it closed the Strait until further notice after firing a warning shot at a vessel trying to transit through an unapproved route.

=== 12 July ===
- About 140 Iranian targets including missile and drone sites, ammunition storages, and communication networks were hit according to the US military.

=== 13 July ===
- Trump announced that the US will reinstate the "Iranian blockade in the Strait of Hormuz" and impose a 20% toll on cargo shipping through the strait. The Yemeni government and Saudi Arabia struck the Sanaa International Airport controlled by the Houthis, allegedly to prevent an Iranian plane from landing. The Houthis retaliated by launching missiles and drones against Saudi Arabia's Abha International Airport. American led Combined Maritime Forces' Joint Maritime Information Centre (JMIC) announced that the US naval blockade on Iran will start the following day. The US announced that it hit military targets throughout Iran including Bushehr, Chabahar, Jask, Konarak, Abu Musa, and Bandar Abbas. Two Emirati tankers were reportedly struck by Iranian cruise missiles in the Strait in Oman's territorial waters, killing one Indian crew member and injuring 10 other Indian crews, two of them critically.

=== 14 July ===
- The US military launched a new round of strikes against Iran in an effort to degrade capabilities used to attack commercial shipping in the Strait of Hormuz. Additionally, the U.S. Navy reinstated the naval blockade that ended on June 17 after the Islamabad MOU was signed. Despite this, Trump cancelled plans to impose fees in the strait.
- Explosions were also reported in the Iranian cities of Ahvaz and Bandar Abbas, and the islands of Kish and Qeshm. The IMO said that death toll from Hormuz ship attacks on that day increased to two.

=== 16 July ===
- The U.S. military launched strikes against Iran for a sixth consecutive day. Explosions were reported in Iran's Qeshm Island, Bushehr, Ahvaz, and Bandar Abbas. A bridge in Bandar Khamir was targeted along with a truck, killing the driver. Additionally, Tasnim News Agency reported that American fighter jets attacked the Iranshahr Airport in the Sistan and Baluchestan province. Additionally, new videos were seen of strikes hitting the base.

=== 18 July ===
Army Pvt. Isabella Gonzalez, 19, who was killed during the attack on Muwaffaq Salti Air Base in Jordan on 17 July.

- The U.S. military reported that two American soldiers were killed in Jordan after Iranian missiles attacked the country. In response, CENTCOM launched strikes against IRGC targets. The two troops were identified as 25-year-old Tyler James Feehan of Hawaii and 19-year-old Isabella Gonzales of Texas.

=== 19 July ===
- The U.S. military reported that an American service member died in northern Iraq, bringing the total casualties of American soldiers in the Iran war to 17. Later in the evening, the U.S. launched strikes against Iran for a ninth consecutive evening.

=== 20 July ===
- CENTCOM completed a 10th round of strikes against Iranian military command centers, missile and drone launch sites, maritime capabilities and air defense systems.
- The New York Times reported that American soldiers were injured and several helicopters were damaged during Iranian strikes against Jordan. Additionally, Pentagon spokesperson Sean Parnell said around 100 U.S. troops have been injured since the war resumed on July 7.

=== 21 July ===
- CENTCOM confirmed they had launched an 11th round of strikes against Iranian hangars and military targets such as logistics infrastructure. Additionally, Israeli finance minister Bezalel Smotrich stated that Israel will not join the U.S. in striking Iran. An third American service member identified as Sgt. Angel S Rampersad is also confirmed to have been killed during an attack on the Muwaffaq Salti Air Base in Jordan.

=== 22 July ===
- Tasnim News Agency reported that at 2:48 pm (IRST), the U.S. military launched missile strikes against Larak Island in the Strait of Hormuz. At 5:30 p.m. ET, CENTCOM launches a new round of strikes against Iran, marking the 12th consecutive day of attacks against the country.

=== 23 July ===
- The Islamic Republic News Agency reported that the U.S. military struck the Shalamcheh area near the Iran–Iraq border. Two people were reported to be killed and 11 were reported injured. At 6:45 p.m. ET, CENTCOM announced on X that they have conducted strikes against Iran for a 13th consecutive night amidst clashes over shipping routes, with explosions reported in Ahvaz, Bandar Abbas, and Qeshm Island.

=== 25 July ===
- The Iranian health ministry spokesperson Hossein Kermanpour reported no U.S. military strikes against Iran, after 13 consecutive nights of strikes by CENTCOM against the country. On 26 July, a senior official said that Iran will halt attacks as long as the U.S. does the same. Additionally, U.S. Ambassador to the UN Mike Waltz said that the U.S. paused the attacks to allow more room for diplomacy. Additionally it also marked the second consecutive day without strikes.

=== 29 July ===
- After six days of pause in strikes, CENTCOM at 8:00pm launched retaliatory strikes against Iran in response to an attempted attack against Jordan, which was foiled the previous day. Earlier in the day, CENTCOM and Saudi Arabian Armed Forces launched strikes against Iran-backed militias in Iraq that killed 20 Popular Mobilization Forces militants. Several members of the Islamic Revolutionary Guard Corps were also killed during the attacks.

== August ==
=== 1 August ===
- The New York Times reported, citing state and local officials, that evidence leads to Iran in a series of cyberattacks against water systems in at least seven US states, with Michigan being the second state to report the attacks publicly.

=== 2 August ===
- On 2 August, after Qatari efforts to head off the attacks and open the Hormuz and Saudi Crown Prince Mohammed bin Salman expressed concern about Trump's plans for massive strikes on Iran, Trump stated that he and Israel had called off the attack after the Iranian regime requested more time for a deal, and that a plan was in place for US forces to carry out the largest US operation since World War II. The Islamic Republic of Iran Armed Forces denied requesting the US to halt strikes, calling Trump's claim a "lie".

=== 3 August ===
- Iran is in talks with Oman, but the agreement is not enough to open the Strait of Hormuz, according to Foreign Ministry spokesman Esmail Baghaei.

=== 6 August ===
- Oman accepted the framework of an agreement with Iran to temporarily reopen the Hormuz.

=== 7 August ===
- CNN reported that Gen. Dan Caine has privately urged Trump advisers to seek an off-ramp from the war, warning that escalation could backfire and that airstrikes alone are unlikely to meet the administration's goals.

=== 8 August ===
- The IRGC stated that reopening the Hormuz is not dependent on talks with Oman but rather on the US accepting Iran's conditions.
- The UAE stated that Iran attacked an Abu Dhabi National Oil Company tanker in the Hormuz.
- Iran's Supreme National Security Council outlined conditions for the US to fulfill before reopening the Hormuz including a commitment from the US to cease threats against Iran, end wars involving non-state allies like Hezbollah, Hamas and Houthis, lift the naval blockade of Iranian ports, withdraw US troops, compensate for losses from the Twelve-Day War and the current war, remove all sanctions, and release all Iranian frozen assets.

=== 11 August ===
- US forces fired at the rudder of a Panama-flagged vessel that attempted to overcome its naval blockade of Iran while passing via the Gulf of Oman, without causing casualties.

=== 12 August ===
- Abu Dhabi National Oil Company stated that two of its vessels were attacked while passing through the Hormuz.

=== 14 August ===
- Iran stated that it downed an American UAV above Hormozgan province.
- Two vessels, including one belonging to the Abu Dhabi National Oil Company were attacked while passing through the Hormuz.

=== 16 August ===
- Iran Army Chief Amir Hatami declared that the army is offering a bounty of $30,000 for killing or capturing invading US soldiers, with the payment doubled if carried out by a woman.

=== 17 August ===
- The office of the prime minister of the Kurdistan Region was reportedly targeted by Iranian drones. Iran called the incident a "false flag" attack.
- Iran stated that it reached an agreement with Oman over the Hormuz. Trump warned that U.S. ally Oman must fall in line or face military strikes if it interferes with American-led efforts to resolve the standoff over the Strait of Hormuz.
- Esmail Baghaei, Iran's Foreign Ministry spokesman, rejected talks on extending the MOU, state outlet Tasnim reported.

=== 18 August ===
- The UAE stated that Iran fired two missile towards it, adding that one landed inside its territorial waters. The UAE then halted all trade, exchange, and financial transactions with Iran until further notice. Iran denied that it launched missiles towards the UAE, citing a "false flag" operation.

=== 20 August ===
- Declaring "economic "economic D-day," Trump announced that any nation trading with Iran would be sanctioned. Mohsen Rezaee, the secretary of Iran's National Security Council, stated that any regional country that participates in the US sanctions against Iran will be regarded as an enemy. The Asia-based USS George Washington replaced Abraham Lincoln, resulting in the lack of a US aircraft carrier in the Indo-Pacific. (Note: It followed reports of mental health issues and supply shortages and broken toilets that affected all crew members, including female soldiers aboard while the latter was supporting the war.) On 20 July, the Houthis announced a blockade of Saudi Arabian ports and ships in the Strait of Bab al-Mandab.

=== 22 August ===
- Iraq secured Iranian authorization for a number of its oil tankers to transit through the Hormuz.

=== 24 August ===
- Iran announced it blacklisted 45 tankers which have violated its rules for passing through the Hormuz, and would take action against any vessels transferring loads with them.
- US Treasury Secretary Scott Bessent announced a new US sanctions campaign against the Iranian regime dubbed Operation Economic Outcast, warning that every country has a set deadline to halt economic activities with the regime identified by Washington or risk Treasury action which includes that removal of the US dollar financial system.

=== 25 August ===
- US officials with firsthand knowledge corroborated Trump's assertion that the US Navy had cleared mines from the Hormuz Traffic Separation Scheme, Oman's primary maritime corridor with Iran, adding that over the last few months, underwater drones carried out a systematic scanning of the area, identifying over 100 objects suspected of having mines, which were then removed or detonated by private contractors. Trump added that the US will destroy Iranian vessels laying more mines in the Hormuz.
- US Secretary of State Marco Rubio told allies around the globe that "for the time being," the US is not expected to resume major combat operations against the Iranian regime, with a second US official adding that this is expected to be the policy at least until after the midterm election, when a new military campaign could be considered.

=== 26 August ===
- The IRGC announced that Iran and Oman reached deals on the Hormuz share and its revenue.

=== 27 August ===
- Maritime intelligence firm Kplr confirmed declining Iranian control in the Strait of Hormuz.

=== 30 August ===
- A Pentagon assessment warned Defense Secretary Pete Hegseth that sustained military operations against Iran could leave the U.S. less able to respond to threats elsewhere and protect the homeland, although Chief Pentagon Spokesman Sean Parnell dismissed the report as inaccurate.
- US forces stated that they targeted two Iranian launchers on Larak Island after IRGC forces were identified preparing to launch rockets carrying sea mines toward the Hormuz. The IRGC stated that the attack killed and injured several Iranian soldiers and civilians.

=== 31 August ===
- Iran claimed to have retaliated by attacking U.S. bases in Jordan and U.S. military assets in the United Arab Emirates. It also shot down a U.S. MQ-9 drone in the Strait of Hormuz. Trump promised to respond to the Iranian attack against American soldiers in Jordan. Iranian media stated that a Saudi oil tanker was stopped while transiting the southern corridor of the Strait of Hormuz.

== September ==
=== 1 September ===
- The British military announced that a tanker was hit by three projectiles while getting out of the Strait of Hormuz.
- Following a series of reciprocal military strikes between the United States and Iran, crude oil prices rose above the $90-per-barrel level, driven by market perceptions of escalating geopolitical risk.
- The US announced that it struck IRGC targets in Iran, adding that it targeted tankers owned by the National Iranian Oil Company as part of a new "tanker for tanker" policy. Trump said that one target was Iranian work to rebuild radar systems. Iranian state media said that US targets included Jiroft Airport, and that a US strike in Kuhestak killed five people including two children and injured over 63 others in a wedding; it announced new attacks against US targets in the region. A communications tower about 130 metres (430 ft) south of the wedding location was also struck in the attack. In response to the Kuhestak attack, Iran targeted Camp Titin, a Marine Corps base near the Gulf of Aqaba, and Prince Hassan Air Base in Jordan (home to RQ-4 and MQ-9 drones), which Iran said resulted in the destruction of several aircraft and the killing of a number of American personnel. Jordan announced that it had shot down 10 of 13 missiles launched at its territory, with the rest hitting open ground. (Note: It took place within a coordinated, US-supported intelligence and defense architecture designed to protect both Jordanian sovereignty and American bases.)
- Iran announced new attacks against US targets in the region. A communications tower in Kuhestak was hit in a US attack.

=== 2 September ===
- The Deputy Governor of Khuzestan Province for Security and Law Enforcement Affairs stated that a US missile attack on three areas in the province killed seven people and wounded eight others the day before.
- The IRGC announced that its four aerospace personnel and three Basij members were killed in separate US attacks in Kermanshah province and Lavan Island the previous day, adding that several other Basij members were injured in the attack on Lavan Island.
- Donald Trump posts on Truth Social about changing the name of the Hormuz Strait to the "Trump Strait".
- Iran stated that a total of 18 people were killed and 108 others were injured in US attacks the prior day.
- US Defense Secretary Pete Hegseth extended the deployments of approximately 50,000 American soldiers in West Asia, which include warship crews, air defense units, and paratroopers, until 2027.

=== 3 September ===
- Iran announced that it targeted Ahmad al-Jaber Air Base and Al Minhad Air Base.
- Iran media declared that six navy soldiers were killed in a US attack in south two days before.
- US Vice President JD Vance announced that Washington cut contact with Iran as long as it fires at vessels traveling through the Strait of Hormuz without its permission.
- The Houthis launched a general offensive in coastal regions for control of the Bab-el-Mandeb Strait.

=== 4 September ===
- The US military announced that it had disabled ad trackers on devices following reports that commercially available location data had been used to target its soldiers in the Mideast.

=== 5 September ===
- The IRGC announced that it struck a US aircraft carrier and a navy destroyer with ballistic missiles, saying both vessels were damaged and forced to leave the area. The US military declared that those two vessels evaded the attack.
- The US military reported that it destroyed three IRGC-connected oil tankers in response to latter's fire on its warships.
- The IRGC stated that it targeted three oil tankers which were traversing through Hormuz without its approval, adding that it launched strikes on three additional US vessels in other areas following the US attacks.

=== 6 September ===
- The IRGC declared that it struck a US drone boat which attempted to enter Hormuz, a claim rejected by the US as a "total lie".

=== 7 September ===
- Lebanon's health ministry announced that at least 4,362 people had been killed in Israeli attacks since 2 March 2026, including 11 in the past 24 hours.
- Iran's top negotiator, Mohammad Bagher Ghalibaf, warned that U.S. attacks will trigger a faster, heavier, and more painful response, saying the "rules of the game have changed."

=== 8 September ===
- Iranian army announced that air defence systems downed a General Atomics MQ-1 Predator drone above Bandar Abbas.
- The Revolutionary Guards also announced that they had seized a US-made Dive-LD unmanned submarine at the entrance to the Strait of Hormuz.

=== 9 September ===
- The US announced that it destroyed five Iranian tankers, one of which was sunk, in retaliation to additional attempted missile attacks on one of its Navy warships. Jordan said that it intercepted 18 of 20 ballistic missiles coming from Iran, adding that two missiles landed in uninhabited regions. The IRGC stated that it struck two US vessels and eight oil tankers in Hormuz following the US attacks. The IRGC claim related to the US vessels was denied by the US. Iran announced that it targeted US military sites in Jordan. The British military announced that several merchant vessels in the northern Gulf and the Gulf of Oman were struck with disabling fire during military activity there. Panama-flagged tanker New Andros was attacked with UAV in Iraqi waters. One crew member was killed and one person was left unaccounted for after an event involving oil tanker Hercules Star near Dubai. A Fairchild Republic A-10 Thunderbolt II was hit and left with a missing wing, while approximately eight F-15s were lightly damaged in the Iranian strike on Muwaffaq Salti Air Base.

=== 11 September ===
- The Houthis recaptured the island of Perim, opening a new front in the war. The Houthis completed their takeover of the Bab el-Mandeb area after capturing the island, which sits in the middle of the shipping lane and divides the strait into two navigable channels.
- Saudi Crown Prince Mohammed bin Salman reportedly urged President Trump to take military action against the Houthis, but Trump declined. He later said the Houthis had signaled that they did not want a conflict with the United States.
- Trump explicitly framed the war as a continuation of the post-9/11 War on Terror.
- Saudi Arabia announced that it has temporarily closed the East–West Crude Oil Pipeline in the Riyadh and Medina areas because of attacks by UAVs from Iraq the day before, adding that some people were wounded. (Note: It did not provide any additional information about who was behind the drone launch, but several Iran-backed Shiite militias operate in Iraq after the infrastructure of the Ba'athist Iraqi armed forces and intelligence were disbanded in a US-led process known as "de-Ba'athification" following the 2003 invasion of Iraq.) The pipeline is one of the kingdom's main routes for exporting crude while bypassing the Strait of Hormuz.

=== 12 September ===
- The US restricted air defence time slots for vessels traversing Hormuz, limiting guaranteed military protection to two specific time windows per day instead of continuous overnight coverage, after increased Iranian attacks on ships travelling at night.
- Trump stated that Iran was "probably responsible" for the aerial attack on Saudi Arabia that shut down the East–West pipeline, and said he had spoken with Saudi Crown Prince Mohammed bin Salman.
- IRGC and Iranian police forces engaged in an hours-long conflict with militants of the PFF in Saravan, resulting in the deaths of four Baloch separatists and multiple IRGC soldiers.

=== 14 September ===
- Missiles targeted three Iranian Kurdish opposition camps in Sulaymaniyah.
- Fars News Agency reported, citing the IRGC that a vessel exploded and caught fire following collision with mines in Hormuz.
- A U.S. Department of Defense report indicates that the Iran war costs reached approximately $33.4 billion by late June. Furthermore, high munitions usage has depleted strategic reserves and exposed critical bottlenecks in the industrial capacity needed for resupply.

=== 15 September ===
- The US military announced that it destroyed two Iranian small boats the day before following an IRGC attempt to capture one of its Navy drones patrolling Hormuz.
- Fars News Agency reported that the IRGC intercepted a MQ-1 drone above Hormuz in the third such incident on that day.

=== 16 September ===
- According to the US Congressional Budget Office, the United States had spent over $38 billion (€33 billion) on its war with Iran between the conflict's start on 28 February and 1 August.

=== 17 September ===
- In an interview with Axios, Trump stated that he faces a "big decision" on whether to resume large-scale military attacks against the Iranian regime or pursue a diplomatic agreement to end the almost seven-month-old conflict. Trump announced that he would consult with leaders from six Gulf Cooperation Council states—Saudi Arabia, the UAE, Qatar, Bahrain, Kuwait, and Oman—on the sidelines of the upcoming UN General Assembly meeting in New York to gauge regional alignment before finalizing a post-war strategy.
- The British military reported a security event in Hormuz, near Oman.
- The US confirmed that Iran shot down at least two of its MQ-1 drones in the past few days.
- Iranian personnel and People's Fighters Front militants clash at Zahedan, with casualties reported for both sides.

=== 18 September ===
- The IRGC stated that it hit a Togo-flagged vessel the day before while trying to make an "illegal passage" through Hormuz, adding that it came to a halt after catching fire.
- The British military stated that a vessel was hit by an "unknown projectile" in Hormuz.
- Hundreds of thousands rallied in Iran in a government-organized show of defiance — the largest demonstration since the US and Israel attacked in February — vowing to fight. About 313,000 volunteers participated in a large-scale parade in Tehran on 18 September that included specialized units for women and demonstrated drone operations, weapon handling, and tactical maneuvers.

=== 19 September ===
- The US Central Command commander Adm. Brad Cooper stated that CENTCOM forces enabled more than one billion barrels of crude oil to exit the Gulf through Hormuz in recent months.

=== 20 September ===
- The Liberia-flagged vessel Al Maryah was attacked while getting out of Hormuz.

=== 21 September ===
- An attack on a tanker in Hormuz slightly injured two crew members.

=== 23 September ===
- Iranian personnel and PFF militants exchange gunfire at the town of Jihadabad. Multiple PFF fighters and Iranian personnel were reported killed including senior IRGC commander Hossein Zarifi and IRGC base intelligence chief Ahmad Herati Zeraati per Tasnim.

=== 26 September ===
- Trump rejected Iran's seven-day ceasefire proposal and expressed doubt that Tehran would eventually comply with his administration's nuclear demands.

=== 27 September ===
- Trump said that he still expected more talks with Iran to resume during the week. Trump claimed that Iran "wanted to make a deal," but they "overplayed their hand" by offering conditions that the US "would have maybe agreed to a year ago."

=== 29 September ===
- Hossein Mohebbi, a spokesperson for the IRGC, read a text titled "letter to the American people" at a press conference in Tehran. The letter was apparently addressed to the American public and was released before the November midterm elections. In it, the IRGC called on the American people to take to the streets and protest against President Donald Trump and his administration's war policies, claiming that the 2026 Iran war had failed. The day after on September 30, the U.S. State Department described it as a "smokescreen". A State Department spokesman also described it as an "effort to lie to the American people" that did not "change the hard facts" about the Iranian government. On October 1, 2026, Bloomberg News Opinion columnist Mark Champion examined the letter in an analysis. He wrote that while the letter raises real issues, it also contains exaggerated claims in an attempt to influence American voters.

== October ==
=== 1 October ===
- The US military started sending about 9,000 soldiers to the Middle East on naval ships, such as the USS Makin Island amphibious readiness group and the USS Theodore Roosevelt carrier strike group.

=== 4 October ===
- U.S. and British officials reported that 12 B-1 bombers were withdrawn from RAF Fairford due to fears of an Iranian IRGC-ordered drone strike.

=== 5 October ===
- In a midterms campaign rally in Grand Island, Nebraska, Trump referenced the economic price of the war on American goods but said regarding Iran, "They can take out a city. Let them take out Los Angeles, let them take out San Diego," drawing cheers from his crowd. California governor Gavin Newsom and other politicians from the state condemned Trump's remarks as "dangerous" and "irresponsible" for American lives in the two cities.
- Trump stated that he remained "always open" to direct negotiations with Tehran.

=== 6 October ===
- Qater confirmed that the US-Iran discussions are occurring, and that messages are being exchanged between the sides through it and its regional partners.

=== 7 October ===
- The Strait of Hormuz maritime conflict intensified significantly in late September and early October. At least 12 attacks against oil, liquefied natural gas (LNG), and liquefied petroleum gas (LPG) tankers traveling through the strait were documented between 28 September and 5 October. This was the highest number of shipping attacks in a single week since the start of the war, according to maritime security tracking sources. Alongside the IRGC's increase in hostilities, which included drone overflights and vessel encounters, Gulf producers pushed for a return to pre-war levels of oil exports.

=== 9 October ===
- An IRGC projectile struck the Panamanian-flagged crude oil tanker Gem No. 2 off the coast of the United Arab Emirates (UAE) on 9 October 2026. The UAE was forced to close beaches and stop fishing in Umm Al Quwain, Ras Al Khaimah, and Sharjah due to structural damage that resulted in a hydrocarbon leak that quadrupled in size to cover over 750 square kilometers (290 sq mi), a leak that was only contained on 30 October.

=== 10 October ===
- A Houthi missile strike caused portions of Terminals 3 and 4 of King Khalid International Airport in Riyadh to collapse, killing 14 civilians and injuring over 300 more. This led international airlines to halt Riyadh flight routes.

=== 16 October ===
- Admiral Brad Cooper, the commander of CENTCOM, declared that a US naval blockade had stopped Iran from exporting $25 billion worth of crude oil, severely straining the IRGC's finances and interfering with salary payments to its regional proxies. Cooper added that CENTCOM and the US Department of Treasury had worked together to freeze about $350 million in Iranian cryptocurrency holdings.

=== 20 October ===
- The Iranian government was accused by US Secretary of State Marco Rubio on 20 October, of using World War II era U-boat tactics. Rubio stated that this was the first time a nation-state had openly targeted civilian sailors and commercial vessels since 1945. Rubio reaffirmed Washington's commitment to applying "extraordinary economic pressure" to prevent Tehran from funding regional proxies.

=== 26 October ===
- CENTCOM reported that since June 2026, the US Navy had successfully circumvented the IRGC's maritime blockade by escorting over 1.5 billion barrels of crude oil through the Strait of Hormuz.

=== 28 October ===
- Iran rejected a new peace plan put forth by Qatari mediators on 28 October 2026, saying that it was unacceptable and reiterating that its nuclear policy was unchangeable. In an attempt to resume peace talks, US Vice President J. D. Vance sent a letter to Iranian National Security Council Secretary Mohsen Rezaei that same day at Trump's directive.

=== 29 October ===
- The IRGC claimed that three vessels caught fire after hitting mines in Hormuz, while another tanker hit naval mines in the eastern part of the strait. Two limpet mines attached to the hull of a small craft disabled the Panamanian-flagged crude oil tanker Louise 1, which was manned by 27 Indian seafarers, 25 nautical miles northeast of Khasab, Oman. After an unsuccessful attempt using unexploded devices in September, the strike was the first successful use of adhesive limpet explosives in the Strait of Hormuz since the war began. The explosions caused an engine room fire but did not result in any casualties or oil leaks.

=== 31 October ===
- Iranian Foreign Minister Abbas Araghchi called US Vice President J.D. Vance's letter a "positive step" toward possible talks, while Mohsen Rezaei cautioned that nuclear talks and the reopening of Hormuz remain dependent on the United States satisfying Iran's demands.

== November ==
=== 2 November ===
- Small-scale, "defensive" strikes were carried out by the US against Iranian positions on Qeshm Island in the Strait of Hormuz. According to a US official, the operation was directed at Iranians who were using surface-to-air missiles against American aircraft.

=== 3 November ===
- Diplomatic attempts to end the conflict came to a standstill, when Mohsen Rezaei publicly rejected a US counterproposal. Rezaei described the US response as "not convincing," stating that until Washington met Iran's seven foundational demands, including lifting the naval blockade and paying war reparations, the Strait of Hormuz would remain closed to adversarial shipping.

=== 6 November ===
- Trump announced that the US conducted "minor" strikes against Iran, targeting "a little bit of an antiaircraft device."

=== 7 November ===
- CENTCOM expanded its interdiction efforts beyond its existing naval blockade by establishing Task Force Iron Gate under Admiral Brad Cooper to obstruct what it described as illicit Iranian shipments and weapons transit across land borders and the Caspian Sea.
- The IRGC declared that it lifted a self-proclaimed restriction of 2,000 km (1,200 mi) in the range of its ballistic missiles.

=== 8 November ===
- A strike took place on Qeshm Island in the Strait of Hormuz overnight on 8–9 November, according to Iranian state media.

=== 10 November ===
- Following threats from Iran, the WSJ reported that the US has moved its aircraft from its second airbase in England (RAF Mildenhall) to Germany and other locations.

=== 11 November ===
- Following US aircraft relocations from RAF Mildenhall and RAF Fairford in the United Kingdom due to Iranian security threats, Mohsen Rezaei warned in an interview with Al Mayadeen, that Iran would strike US military bases in Europe and other distant regions if they were used as launch points for renewed attacks against the country.
- Iranian forces attacked ship navigation systems on Didamar Island, Oman, causing an unknown amount of damage.

=== 12 November ===
- The Islamic Republic News Agency reported an "enemy" attack in Bandar Sirik.

=== 13 November ===
- The IRGC stated that it targeted US early-warning radar in Bahrain following the "enemy attack" on telecom tower. CENTCOM confirmed the attack, stating that it intercepted two IRGC drones.

=== 15 November ===
- The IRGC reported a six-drone strike on a US air defense radar at Riffa Air Base. Following two public shelter-in-place alerts, the Bahrain Defence Force intercepted multiple incoming Iranian aerial attacks, its first since September.

=== 16 November ===
- The IRGC announced that it had captured a US MQM-170 drone intact near the Strait of Hormuz, the fourth drone of this type captured through electronic warfare.
- US intelligence detected potential Iranian plans for dirty bomb or chemical attacks against senior Trump administration officials in Washington, D.C., prompting the relocation of Treasury Secretary Scott Bessent to military housing. Although U.S. officials questioned Iran's capability to carry out the attacks, the White House stated there were "no credible threats to the homeland," and Iran dismissed the allegation.
- In the Strait of Hormuz off Khasab, Oman, the Panamanian-flagged liquefied petroleum gas tanker MT Tara Gas was hit and set on fire. Two of the 24 Indian crew members on board were hospitalized and one of them went missing.

=== 17 November ===
- The IRGC conducted a third drone attack on a US radar installation in Bahrain in retaliation for alleged US airspace violations, ending a two-month lull in strikes against Persian Gulf targets. Hours after the attack, there were reports of smoke and explosions on Qeshm Island. The deputy governor of Hormozgan province said that the US forces had struck several sites on Qeshm Island without causing casualties or damage. The US military did not immediately confirm the strikes. The US military stated that in response to the earlier Iranian drone attack that targeted a US radar installation at Isa Air Base in Bahrain, US fighter aircraft struck an IRGC missile launch site on Qeshm Island in the Strait of Hormuz.
- A projectile struck a liquefied petroleum gas tanker operated by Abu Dhabi National Oil Company in the Strait of Hormuz, forcing the crew to abandon ship and leaving eleven injured and one missing.

=== 18 November ===
- Kuwaiti air defenses engaged and intercepted hostile drone attacks in national airspace, alerting locals to interception blasts. A second round of what the military called "treacherous" Iranian aerial attacks against the kingdom was intercepted by Bahrain's air defenses. The Islamic Republic of Iran Army claimed responsibility for launching drones at US missile and drone installations at Ali Al Salem Air Base in Kuwait.

=== 21 November ===
- Bahrain reported that an Iranian strike caused a fire at a civilian industrial facility without casualties. Later that day, the IRGC launched a combined missile and drone attack on US positions in Riffa and Awali in retaliation for alleged US violations of Iranian airspace, though Bahraini air defenses intercepted most of the projectiles, resulting in minor shrapnel damage.

=== 22 November ===
- Bahrain's Interior Ministry confirmed that the 21 November Iranian attacks had injured two people, leaving one in critical condition.

== See also ==
- List of attacks during the 2026 Iran war
- List of aviation shootdowns and accidents during the 2026 Iran war
