= 2026 Minab school attack =

2026 Iran war missile strike

- Part of the 2026 Iran war
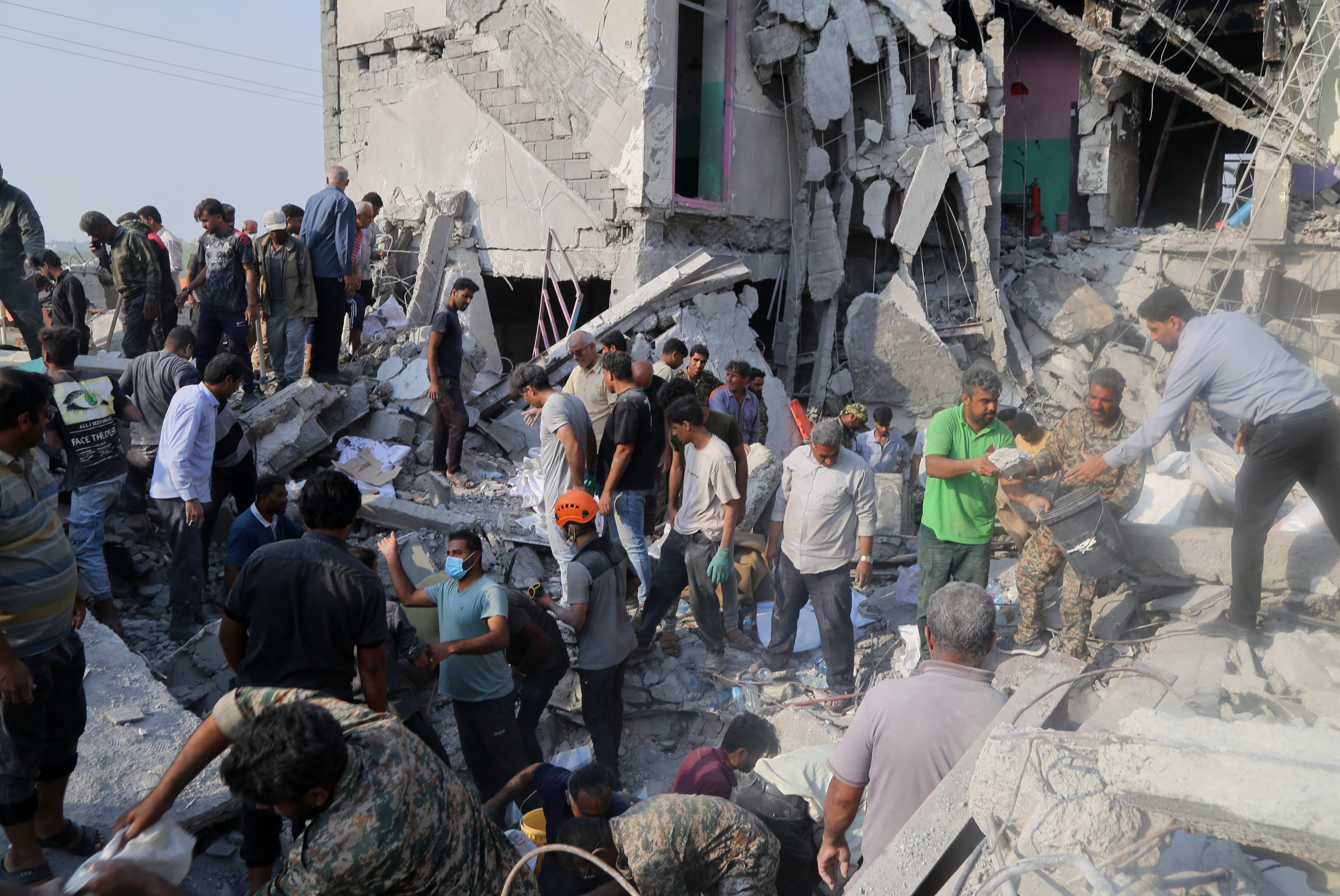
- From top, left to right: Bystanders and rescue workers search through the rubble; Mourners gather for the mass funeral and burial; Remains of a classroom after the strike
- Location: 27°6′35.4″N 57°5′5.1″E; Shajareh Tayyebeh Elementary School; Minab, Hormozgan province, Iran
- Date: 28 February 2026; First strike: ~11:22 a.m. IRST; Second strike: ~2:30 p.m. IRST (UTC+03:30)
- Attack type: Double-tap missile strike
- Weapon: RGM/UGM-109 Tomahawk Land Attack Missile (TLAM)
- Deaths: 156 total: 120 children (73 boy students, 47 girl students); 35 adults (26 woman teachers, 7 parents, school bus driver, clinic worker); 1 fetus
- Injuries: 95
- Victim: Primarily schoolchildren
- Perpetrator: United States Armed Forces

On 28 February 2026, the first day of the 2026 Iran war, the United States (US) Armed Forces struck the Shajareh Tayyebeh (Note: Persian: شجرهٔ طیبه, lit. 'Sacred Tree'.) Elementary School in Minab, Hormozgan province in southern Iran with a Tomahawk missile, before following up with others in close proximity, directly killing 156 civilians, including 120 schoolchildren and 35 adults. As of 22 September 2026, the attack was the deadliest strike in terms of civilian casualties in the ongoing war; it was also the deadliest US attack on civilians in the 21st century, being the deadliest since the Amiriyah shelter bombing in 1991.

Independent investigations, satellite-based analyses, and witness accounts concluded that the school was hit by a US military strike. (Note: Those which concluded the US' responsibility in the attack include the United Nations (UN), Amnesty International, Forensic Architecture (FA) and Sky News, (Note: FA and Sky News, jointly investigating the attack, published articles on their respective channels.) Bellingcat, The New York Times (NYT), the Associated Press (AP), and others.) Sources involved with the US military's internal investigation corroborated that the strike was perpetrated by the US—being aware within hours of the strike—despite the probe not being concluded.

The attack was condemned by the Iranian government, the UN Educational, Scientific and Cultural Organization (UNESCO), the UN Secretary-General (UNSG), some of the US Congress, and other international human rights organizations and activists as a violation of international humanitarian law (IHL). A UN fact-finding mission concluded that there was reasonable grounds to believe the US committed war crimes. US congresspersons and international media outlets condemned the use of AI warfare against Iran, including the Department of Defense's (DoD) Project Maven—a target tagging system integrating elements of Palantir's Maven Smart System and Anthropic's Claude large language model.

== Background ==
=== Minab elementary school and civilian elements ===
The Shajareh Tayyebeh Elementary School in southern Minab was attended by both boys and girls taught on separate floors; girls were taught on the upper floor and boys on the lower. According to locals, the school was previously a military facility during the Iran-Iraq war—ending in 1988—before being converted into a school. Its location was near (Note: Variously described as "about 600m [660 yd] from the base", "within less than 100 yards [91 m] of the perimeter of [the base]", and "adjacent to [the base].") the Sayyid al-Shuhada military complex which included the headquarters of the Asif Brigade of the Islamic Revolutionary Guard Corps Navy (IRGCN), whose operations were "likely administrative in nature" according to FA.

Painted walls included murals

Investigations confirmed that the school had existed as a civilian institution for more than a decade, located close to, but separate from the IRGCN compound. According to satellite imagery, the building housing the school was walled within the IRGCN compound in 2013 and walled off from the rest of the compound by October 2016 at the latest. Its new external wall had three entrances separate from the rest of the compound, allowing entry without having to pass through the compound, and all were without a military security checkpoint. Imagery of a football pitch and assembly areas were visible in August 2017. By 2018, the school compound's walls were painted pink and blue, distinguishing the girls' and boys' yards respectively.

The Guardian determined there was no indication that the building served a military purpose and found that the adjacent compound buildings were a medical clinic and a pharmacy, the former of which was walled off from the compound between 2022 and 2023. Other buildings in the immediate surroundings—some of which were also hit—were also civilian, including a clinic, cultural center, supermarket, car wash, and café. The clinic had been inaugurated in January 2025 by then IRGC commander-in-chief, Major General Hossein Salami. Furthermore, the compound's four military security posts had been removed by 2016. According to Minab's mayor, the compound had been closed for about 15 years and all military personnel had moved out. The school and adjacent civilian facilities also had a rich online presence through its website and social media.

=== US–Iran nuclear negotiations, US military buildup, and use of artificial intelligence ===
Tension between Iran and the United States during negotiations over Iran's nuclear program intensified in January 2026 when Iranian security forces violently suppressed anti-government protesters.

The US began its greatest buildup of military assets in the region since the Iraq War in 2003. The US accused Iran of building up its nuclear and missile programs to threaten the United States and its allies. Iran accused the US of disinformation. Gulf states like Qatar predicted that escalations could severely harm the region. Negotiations regarding the Iranian nuclear program were held in February until the US and Israel commenced military strikes in Iran on 28 February 2026.

In the preparation and planning of Operation Epic Fury, the DoD utilized Project Maven, an artificial intelligence software which uses machine learning algorithms to analyze and fuse vast amounts of surveillance data—designed to streamline the targeting process and greatly reduce the amount of personnel involved in it. These systems rely on data integration software produced by Palantir Technologies. Capable of producing 1,000 target packages in one hour, the US military later claimed to have struck 6,000 targets in Iran during the first two weeks of the war.

=== Pentagon shutting of program to maintain civilian casualty policy ===
Trump's administration reportedly made deep cuts to the Pentagon’s civilian harm mitigation and response (CHMR) program. A report by the Inspector General of the US Army, "the US military no longer has the people, tools or infrastructure needed to comply with two federal statutes requiring it to maintain a functioning civilian casualty policy, and operate a Civilian Protection Center of Excellence (CP CoE)."

== Prelude ==
=== US and Israel begin striking Iran ===
On the morning of 28 February 2026, the US and Israel jointly launched attacks against Iran. Airstrikes began to land around 9:45 a.m. IRST, coinciding with the time at which Iranians usually send their children to school, as Saturday is a working day in Iran. (Note: Iran's workweek begins on Saturday and ends on Thursday. For more information, see Workweek and weekend § Iran.)

=== Attendance and closing of the school ===
Human rights organization Hengaw stated that around 170 students were present in the school at the time while the Iranian Ministry of Education said that 264 students were present.

Between 10:00 and 10:15 a.m.—prior to the nationwide announcement closing schools—one teacher at the school saw that Tehran had been attacked. Believing that neither the school nor the rest of the country would be attacked, the boys' head teacher, Pouran Gholipour, called an emergency announcement to close the school around 11:00 a.m., with the girls' section following suit shortly after. Teachers and administrators began to make calls to parents to have children picked up. Due to congestion and distance, many parents were not able to reach the school before the airstrike landed on the compound.

== Events ==
=== First wave of strikes ===
Compound boundaries: Islamic Revolutionary Guard Corps Navy School perimeter Impacted infrastructure: Burned buildings Destroyed buildings (including missile entry points) Significantly damaged buildings (including missile entry points) Moderately damaged buildings (including damaged areas)

At approximately 11:22 a.m., (Note: Before FA and Sky News established a more precise timing of the strike, other claims of the strike's timing were made. The governor of Hormozgan province stated that the school was struck at 10:45 a.m. local time., with other sources initially estimating that strikes occurred between 10:23 and 10:45 a.m.) strikes on the area began. Of the initial nine strikes, taking place over a minute and a half, the school was the fourth building hit. The impact, landing in the southwesterly half of the building, instantaneously killed dozens inside. The impact affected over half of the structure, destroying the walls of the building and causing its roof to collapse, burying people underneath; graphic footage shows some bodies partly trapped, and others of body parts scattered around the site, some being as far as 147 feet (45 m) meters away. Some of those buried would die of suffocation.

Collapsed second floor of structure

The explosion destroyed at least half of the two-story school building, collapsing much of the upper floor with the lower. Furthermore, according to eyewitness testimony by Hossein, father of schoolgirl victim Zahra: "The boys’ section was still partly standing. But the area where the girls took their lessons had been levelled." Footage taken on the school's brightly painted soccer and volleyball pitches shows smoke coming out of the school's windows, whose muraled walls were adorned with paintings of crayons, children, and an apple.

Immediately following the strike, witnesses recount the principal, teachers, and other staff running towards the building to bring out students who had survived the first strike. Videos, recorded between 12:30 and 1:15 p.m., show civilians and aid workers searching through the rubble, during which a number of children and teachers were rescued. From 1:47 p.m. onwards, multiple news outlets in Iran began to report about the attack, calling the building a girls' school and announcing an initial death toll of five, expecting that it would rise.

=== Second wave of strikes ===
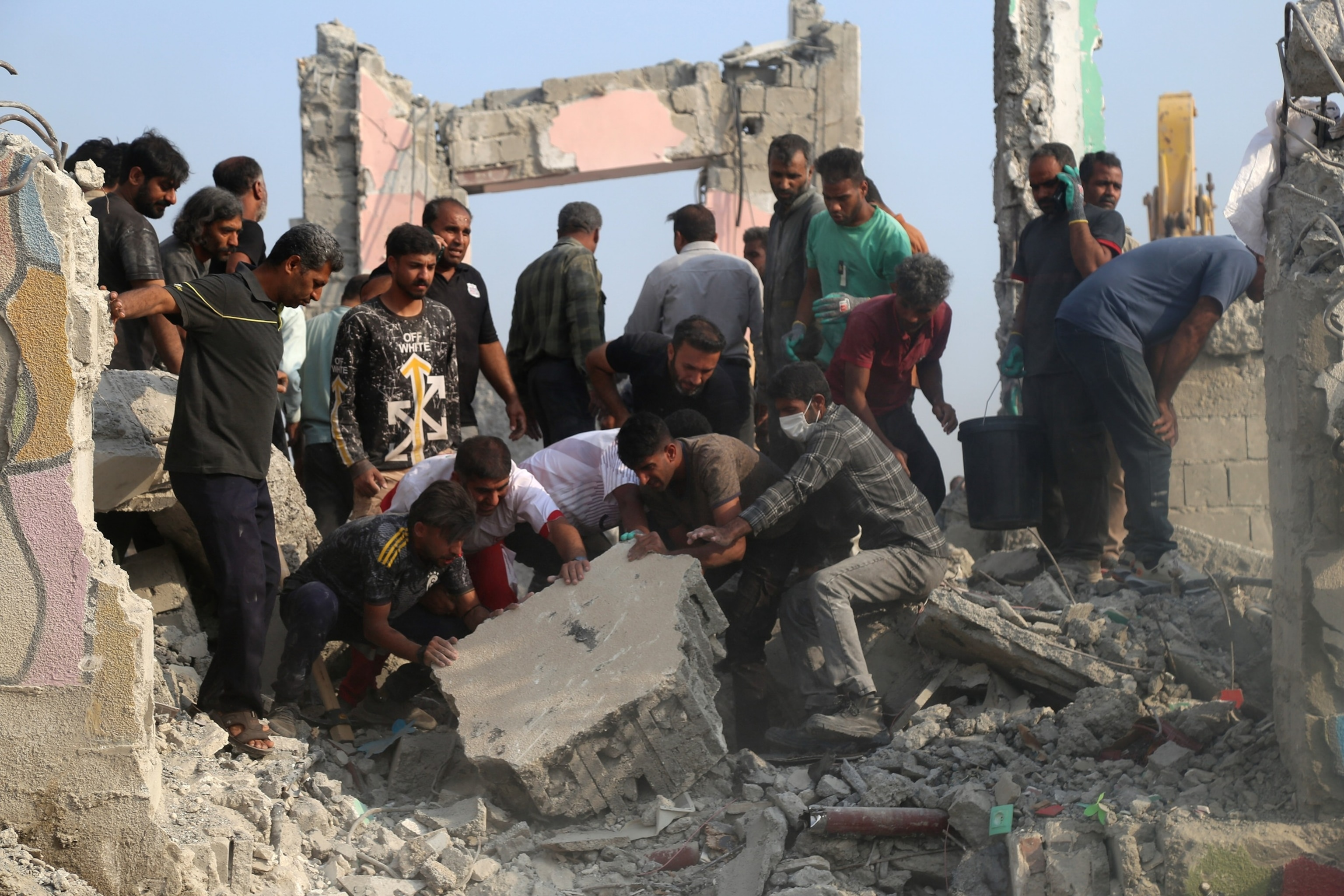
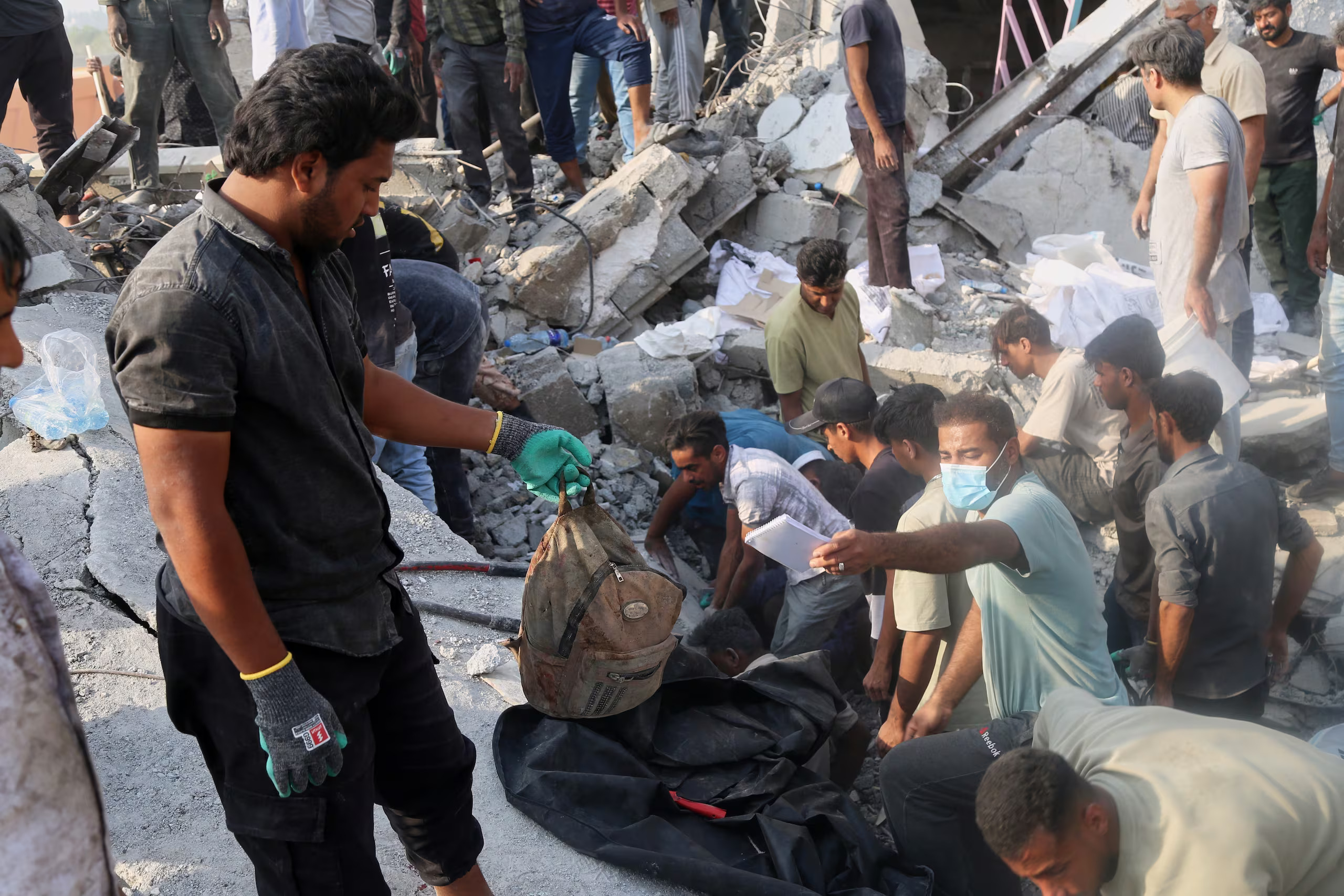
Civilian and volunteer recovery efforts in the immediate aftermath of the attack

According to testimony given to the Middle East Eye by two Red Crescent medics and a victim's parent, the initial strike to the school was followed by a second, "double tap" strike. One of the medics recounted that, following the first strike, the school's principal moved a group of students to a prayer room and called parents, asking them to come pick up their children; that area was then hit by a second strike, killing most that had taken shelter. The parent corroborates this story, relating he received a call from the school informing him of the first strike, which his daughter had survived; but before he could arrive, the school was hit again, and she was killed. According to Minab's mayor and the Iranian Ministry of Education, the school was triple tapped, being struck three times in total. Although satellite-base analysis by BBC Verify suggest the area of the school was hit with multiple missiles, later investigations confirmed only two missiles had impacted the school.

Twelve structures within the IRGC compound were significantly impacted by airstrikes sometime after 10:23 a.m., including the Shahid Absalan Specialist Clinic shortly after the airstrike on the school, which had begun treating those injured in the prior airstrike; it was one of five damaged sites whose roofs were punctured by munitions before the munitions' subsequent detonation. The Daily Telegraph characterized the strike on the clinic as "what appeared to be a second attack on the same location" and by authorities as a "follow-up attack". The NYT corroborated that smoke was billowing from two buildings.

== Death toll ==
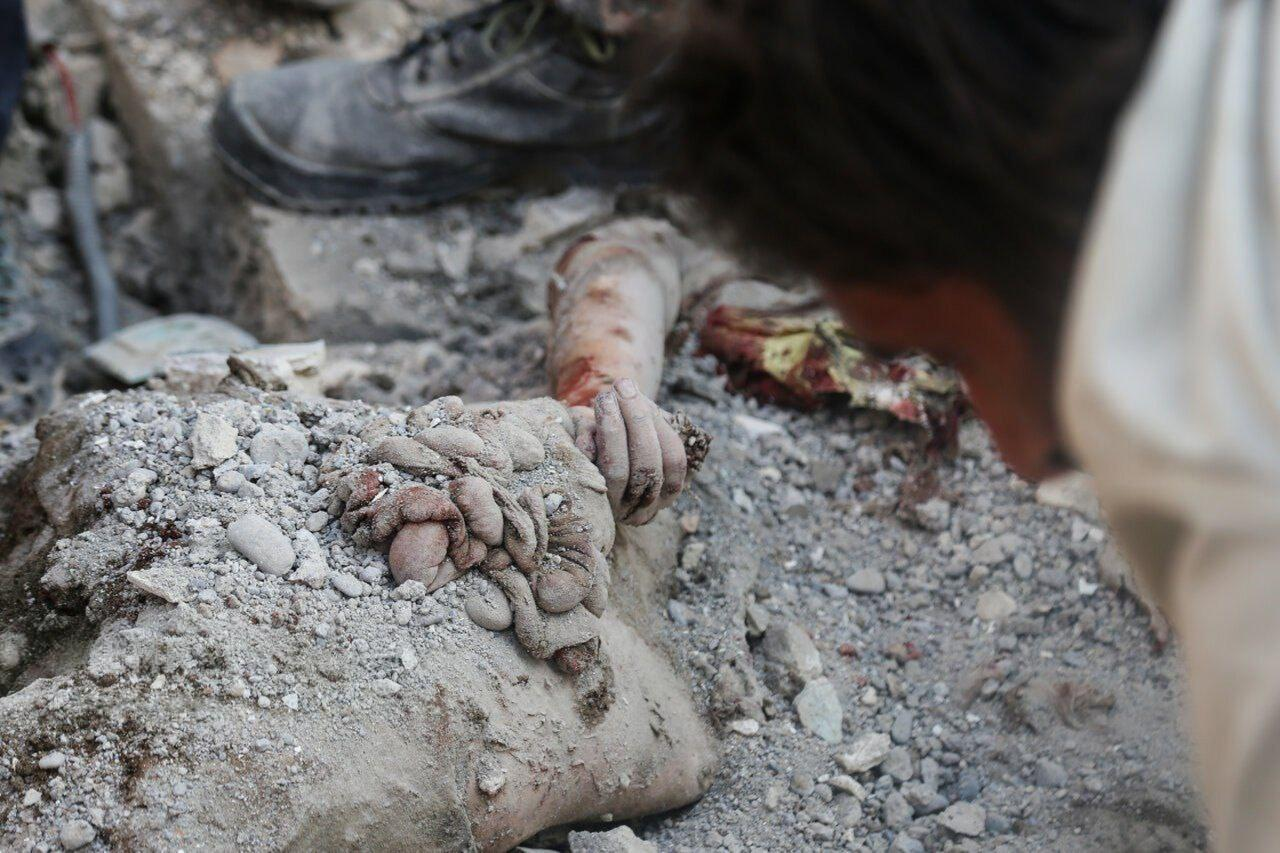
The body of a girl is trapped under the rubble, adjacent to disemboweled, dust-covered internal organs

156 people were killed in the strike; the victims included 120 students (73 boys and 47 girls), 26 teachers (all of whom were women), seven parents of students (four men and three women), a school bus driver and a pharmacy technician from a nearby clinic. Three more were presumed dead. Of the teachers killed, the school's principal was included. According to a local official, the fatalities included multiple parents who had come to pick up their children after the school's closure was ordered. This resulted in the death of three members of a four-member family. Fatalities rose from initial counts after the conclusion of recovery efforts on 1 March, (Note: According to multiple sources, including NBC News, ABC News, Middle East Eye, The Guardian, The New York Times, and Le Monde.) with reported numbers fluctuating as more bodies of those killed were identified.

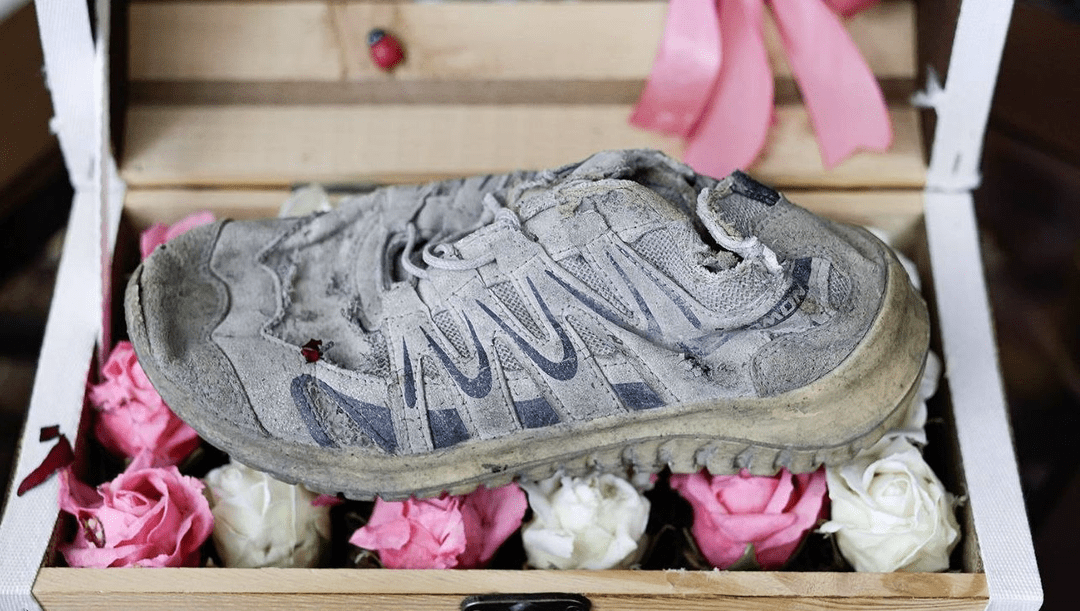
The first trace of Nasiri found during recovery efforts was his sneaker

Of the three presumed to be dead, all were children. Despite neither their bodies nor any trace thereof having been found, they were determined to include Makan Nasiri, Masiha Salari, and Amirali Jedavi. Nasiri's remains included only a blood-stained sweater and pair of sneakers. On 22 September, during a visit to the school, the judiciary spokesperson of Hormozgan officially announced that no remains of the three students had been found. All became symbols of civilian suffering during the conflict in Iran.

=== Fluctuation of death toll during aftermath ===
During rescue efforts, numerous sources reported fatality numbers other than the final official death toll. On 1 March, following the conclusion of search operations, Shiva Amelirad, representing the Coordinating Council of Iranian Teachers’ Trade Associations, told Time magazine that 108 or more children had been killed in the attack, according to sources within Minab she was in contact with. Minab's public prosecutor office reported later that day, through the state-run Islamic Republic News Agency, that 150 "innocent school girls" were killed, with some still trapped under the rubble. The judicial head of Hormozgan stated that 140 of the deceased had been identified up to that point, while efforts continued to identify another 25 people, and that the remains of the bombs used in the attack had been located, seized, and transferred for analysis in preparation for an investigation. On 3 March, Mizan News Agency claimed to have confirmed that 66 boys, 54 girls, 26 teachers, and four parents had been killed. A majority of those reportedly killed were schoolchildren.

== Aftermath ==
Immediate official statements in Iran included the Iranian government stating the missile was a US-Israeli airstrike, whereas Vice Governor of Hormozgan Ahmad Nafisi said the school was struck amidst US-Israeli air raids on Minab. Videos taken of the destroyed school immediately following the attack were verified by the NYT, The Washington Post, Reuters, and Iranian fact-checking organization Factnameh, as authentic; these videos were compared against existing imagery of the school. Drop Site News published accounts of the incident from several parents whose children were among those killed.

=== Emergency and volunteer response ===
People search through rubble after the school airstrike, via Mehr News

As reports emerged that the school had been hit, many panicked locals, including family members of victims, rushed to the scene while security forces attempted to push families back, fearing the area would be targeted again, and sealed off the building. Soon after, recovery efforts began—some informal—as civilians, Iranian Red Crescent Society emergency workers, and individuals donning uniforms resembling the Basij searched through the debris. Although initially using just their hands, rescue services used construction cranes and shovels to save people trapped by rubble, while black smoke scorching the remaining walls continued to pour from the building's windows. Footage reveals items including severed arms, bodies, and school bags being recovered. Other imagery confirmed that areas struck within the school were used for schooling. One video shows a man, previously digging through the rubble, waving dust-covered textbooks and worksheets; in a quote translated by The Guardian, he yelled:

These are the schoolbooks of the children who are under these ruins, under this rubble here. You can see the blood of these children on these books. These are civilians, who are not in the military. This was a school and they came to study.

During recovery efforts, an opening was created between the IRGC and school's compounds, allowing recovery teams to move rubble out of the way. Corpses were collected in body bags and injured victims taken away in ambulances, with most initially being sent to the Hazrat Abolfazl located 2 km away from the school. Later in the day of the strike, bodies of the victims were transferred to their relatives gathering at a nearby designated collection area. The attack flooded Minab's morgues, however, forcing some of the bodies of victims to be held in refrigerated trucks. Identifications efforts took time as some bodies were only able to be identified through the clothes victims were wearing. Authorities announced the end of search operations for survivors on 1 March, despite some bodies still needing identification.

==== Search and identification of remains ====
The strike left some victims so mutilated, they were only identifiable from their clothing and belongings

Recovery operations at the site of the attack continued for approximately 7 months, led by a local forensic medicine department. In July 2026, Iranian officials in Hormozgan Province said that weeks of search operations at Shajareh Tayyebeh School and surrounding areas had uncovered 62 body fragments, which DNA testing identified as belonging to 32 student victims. The remains were buried on 22 July in a ceremony attended by the victims’ families and local residents.

Seven-year-old Makan Nasiri was one of three children from the school whose remains were never recovered. Despite extensive searches by specialized teams and forensic examinations, no part of his remains was found. According to Iranian officials, the search for Nasiri was eventually closed, while a grave was prepared for him and his personal belongings, including a bloodstained sweater and a single shoe, were preserved in a glass display case at a nearby mosque. On 13 September, the head of Iran's Legal Medicine Organization, Abbas Masjedi, announced that all the bodies of the victims from Minab had been identified, except for one, which could not be identified due to its condition and the circumstances of the incident.

=== Mass funeral and burial ===
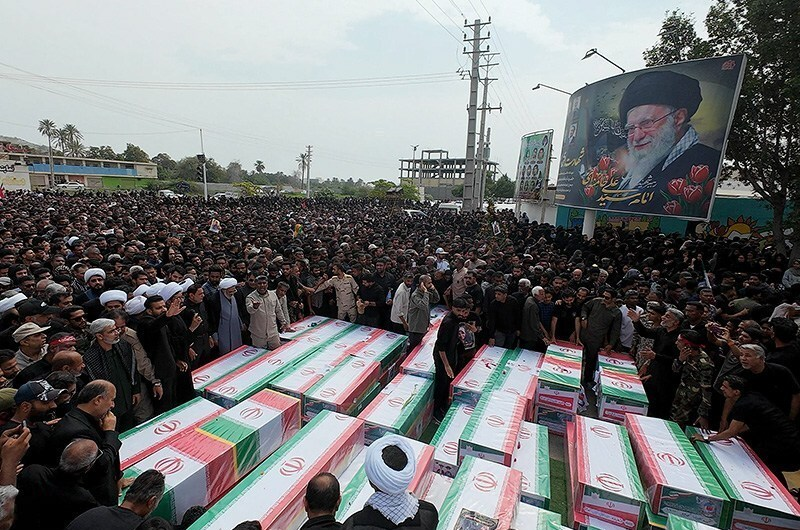
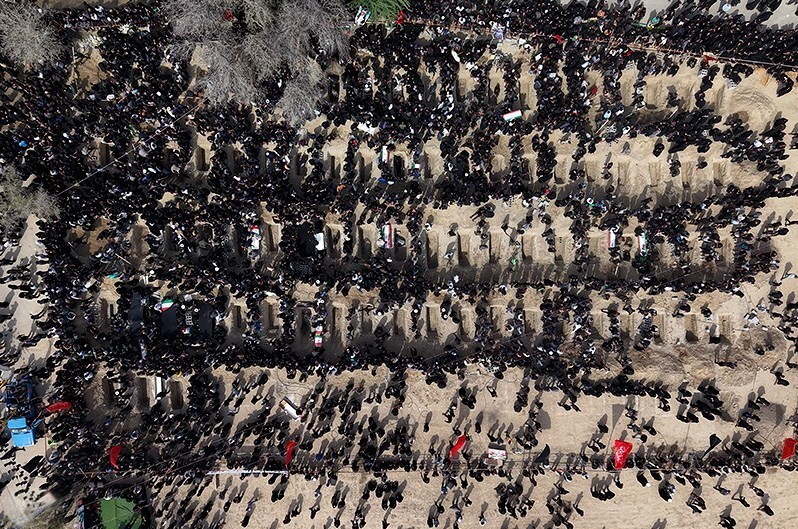
The funeral and mass burial of victims of the attack, both attended by thousands of mourners

On 3 March, Iran held a mass funeral for the children killed in the airstrike in a public square in Minab, attended by thousands of mourners. Those in attendance held up imagery of the attack, faces of the children killed, and phrases condemning what one victim's mother called "a document of American crimes". At least 165 coffins draped with the Iranian flag were carried through Minab's streets on a truck. Some were arranged together in the square, where mourners gathered to be led in a prayer service.

Later that day, an image shared by Iran's foreign minister, Abbas Araghchi, show excavators preparing 100 or more graves at a mass burial site at Minab's Hermud cemetery—demarcated first in small white chalk rectangles—whose grounds were subsequently filled with the mourners which held a procession bringing the caskets of victims to the site. Further imagery shows bodies wrapped in white shrouds being lowered into the prepared graves before being filled in. Some victims were buried at other sites outside Minab. The imagery was mired in uncertainty over its verifiability—promoted in part by AI models misattributing the image to other disasters—but was later confirmed by fact-checkers.

=== Memorializations and stories of grieving ===
On 28 August 2026, the Minab School Museum-Exhibition was opened at the Hozeh Honari Gallery in the presence of Araghchi. The exhibition featured works by several contemporary Iranian painters, including Behzad Shishegaran, Sirous Moghadam, Gholam Ali Taheri, Morteza Asadi, Kazem Chalipa, Ali Nedaei, and others.

== Investigations ==
=== US Department of Defense ===
A week after the strike, on 5 March, Reuters reported that two American military personnel involved in an internal investigation believed the attack was likely perpetrated by the US, although a final conclusion had not yet been reached. On 11 March, the NYT reported that the preliminary findings of the investigation determined that the US was responsible for the strike. The inquiry suggested that the school was likely targeted due to outdated coordinates provided by the Defense Intelligence Agency. CNN reported on 7 July that military intelligence systems had warned users that the information about the target was outdated, but the warnings were ignored. In response to the attention to the NYT article, on 13 March, US secretary of defense Pete Hegseth promised a thorough probe into the strike, in what the Washington Post described as a tacit acknowledgement of US responsibility for the attack. The DoD also said it elevated the investigation. Three US officials told Reuters that the administrative probe was known internally as a "15-6" [United States Army Regulation 15-6], which could be used as basis for disciplinary action.

As of 21 September 2026, the Pentagon's probe has not been released and remains under investigation. However, information divulged by officials revealed that within hours of the attack, Pentagon personnel knew the US was responsible. Bloomberg News reported on 18 September that officials describe it as a "cascade of preventable failures." According to officials, the strike was an accumulation of smaller bad decisions. Pressed by Trump in the final days of February, days before the strikes on Iran, officials said he requested an overwhelming aerial assault, compressing the time frame for compiling targets. Despite this, it was proven that there were "gaps in underlying information about the site, cuts in civilian-protection personnel, and an overreliance on [AI] technology."

=== United Nations ===
A UN investigation was initiated on 17 March and is ongoing. In a report submitted on 18 September, the UN fact-finding mission on Iran said it had reasonable grounds to believe the two-tap strike was conducted by the US, and that the strikes were an indiscriminate attack on civilians that constituted a war crime under international law. It added that the school was "the intended point of impact and that the damage did not result from an errant strike or collateral damage", concluding that "the US directed the strikes at the building of the school while being aware of a substantial risk of striking a civilian object and acting recklessly as regards the possibility that this would happen."

=== Forensic Architecture and Sky News ===
External media
- FA & Sky News investigations
- Airstrikes on Minab Primary School
- Sky News investigation into Minab school attack finds all evidence points to US being responsible

FA—a multidisciplinary research group based out of Goldsmiths, University of London—partially worked together with British news outlet Sky News—whose Full Story Films commissioned FA's work—to independently investigate the strike. Conducted over the four and a half months following the strike, the investigation sought to reconstruct a chronology of events including geolocating, timing strikes, and stories of survivors. Techniques FA employed included 3D modeling, image-data complex, open-source intelligence (OSINT), photogrammetry, and cartographic regression.

FA and Sky News published the results of their investigations on their separate platforms on 16 July 2026. FA said that "following the initial media reporting [after the first strike], US forces would have had an opportunity to reassess their initial misidentification, before conducting subsequent strikes"—inherently blaming the US for the strikes. Sky News corroborated this fact, concluding that "all evidence points to [the] US being responsible".

== Reactions ==
=== Domestic ===
==== Government and military ====
Seyed Abbas Araghchi
(@araghchi)
tweeted:

The destroyed building is a primary school for girls in the south of Iran. It was bombed in broad daylight, when packed with young pupils.

Dozens of innocent children have been murdered at this site alone.

These crimes against the Iranian People will not go unanswered.

28 February 2026

The day of the strikes, President Masoud Pezeshkian said that "the American and Zionist aggression against Minab Elementary School will never be erased from the historical memory of our nation". Araghchi said that the "crimes against the Iranian people will not go unanswered". The foreign ministry spokesperson Esmail Baghaei called the airstrike a "blatant [war] crime", adding that "the world must stand up to this great injustice", including "the UN Security Council [which] must act now in line with its primary responsibility under the Charter". The spokesperson for the Health Ministry, Hossein Kermanpour, called the report of the attack "the most bitter news" so far, adding that there may be even more bodies under the rubble.

Iran's ambassador to the United Nations, Ali Bahreini, followed up on calls from Iranian officials on 1 March, raising the "unjustifiable" and "criminal" issue with UN human rights chief, Volker Türk, which Türk heeded. In an opinion piece for Al Jazeera, Bahreini placed blame on Trump as the commander-in-chief of the American armed force for the attack, arguing that "the legal question is tragically clear" before writing that "a missile engineered for precision struck a school building at the precise moment when children were present", the result of which "was not collateral damage but a human catastrophe".

==== Public and organizations ====
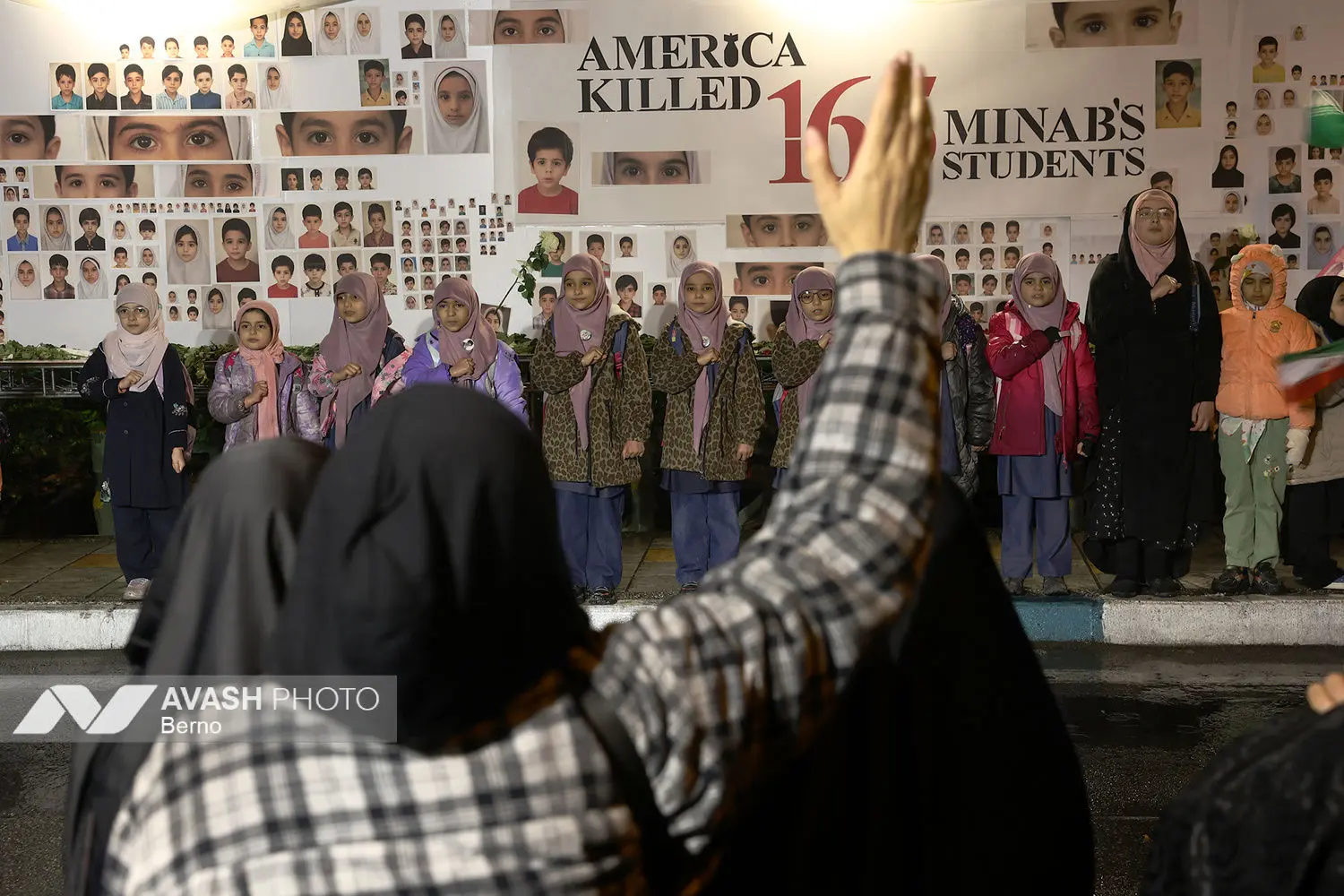
"Minab Died" protest in front of the UN office in Tehran, March 2026

The head of Iran's Red Crescent, Pirhossein Kolivand, said the "unique and bitter incident" had "no comparison with any other incident" even outside of Iran, as he said no singular attack killed so many students simultaneously, "even in Gaza".

In March 2026—during a friendly football match against Nigeria in Belek, Turkey—players of Iran's national team, as a "collective decision", wore black armbands and held up pink and purple school backpacks adorned with a ribbon during the national anthem. They also later held up images of both people, including children, that had died and sporting and heritage infrastructure damaged in attacks across the country. Prior to the beginning of the 2026 FIFA World Cup—landing in Tijuana, Mexico where they resided during the tournament—the team wore pins reading "#168," replicating an online hashtag representing the number of victims killed in the attack.

=== International ===
==== United States ====
===== Executive government and military =====
Trump answers a question about the school attack on 17 June 2026

The first US response to the strike came from Captain Tim Hawkins on 1 March, speaking on behalf of the US Central Command (CENTCOM). He said: "we are aware of reports concerning civilian harm resulting from ongoing military operations. We take these reports seriously and are looking into them. The protection of civilians is of utmost importance, and we will continue to take all precautions available to minimize the risk of unintended harm." On 4 March, US state secretary Marco Rubio said that the DoD and The Pentagon were investigating whether the airstrike was fired by the US and added that the US "would not deliberately target a school". The same day, Hegseth evaded questions on the matter and provided few details other than to echo Rubio in saying that the US was "investigating" the incident and would "never target civilian targets". On 7 March, Donald Trump claimed that the strike was "done by Iran... They're very inaccurate with their munitions. They have no accuracy whatsoever."

Trump later said the incident remained under investigation, stating that “mistakes are made” and that “nobody did that on purpose.” He added that he did not have full details of what had occurred and said he would accept the findings of the inquiry. It was also reported that senior U.S. military officials were in the final stages of reviewing an internal Pentagon investigation into the strike, with concerns in Congress that the findings could be classified and withheld from the public.

===== House representatives and senators =====
After initial international reporting on the strike, a group of U.S. senators led by Tammy Baldwin, on 11 March, called on the DoD to provide answers regarding the strike. According to the press release, a "military investigation concluded that the United States was responsible" for the attack. The senators emphasized that the attack occurred during US military operations in Iran and stressed the need for transparency and public accountability. The letter further noted that the United States has not formally taken responsibility for the strike, while military findings and evidence suggest that US forces were likely involved.

First page of Van Hollen's Senate letter to Hegseth on 11 March 2026

Following the NYT's reporting on the preliminary findings of the Pentagon probe, senators Brian Schatz, Jeanne Shaheen, Chris Van Hollen, Tim Kaine, and Elizabeth Warren led 46 mostly Democratic senators—including themselves—to demand Trump answer for the school strike on 17 March, particularly probing on matters of responsibility, compliance with international law, the establishment of a "no-strike list", the use of artificial intelligence, and mitigation of civilian harm given the high volume of strikes the first day of the Iran war. The only Democratic senator to abstain from the letter was John Fetterman, who has supported Trump and Israel, including having blocked a resolution to halt Trump's war powers a week prior; Fetterman told Reuters that he did not sign the letter because "the [US] never intentionally targets civilians, including its own citizens, unlike Iran. Everyone agrees it was a tragedy. Everyone agrees on performing a full investigation." No Republican senator was signatory to the letter. The following day, 18 March, some of these lawmakers attended a demonstration organized by the advocacy group Win Without War on Capitol Hill, which displayed an array of shoes and backpacks. Representative Jason Crow followed the Senate's suit on 12 March, leading 120 Democratic congresspersons—including himself—to demand "answers on recent civilian deaths during Operation Epic Fury, including a US strike on an Iranian girls’ elementary school where at least 175 civilians, many of them children, were killed". Signatories Sara Jacobs, Yassamin Ansari, and others sent a letter directly to Hegseth which "requested detailed information about the strikes on the Shajareh Tayyebeh school, the nature of the military targeting, the steps taken to mitigate and respond to civilian harm, and more", including findings of the US military-led investigation. Some legislators also made individual statements condemning the attack.

On 13 July, senator Kirsten Gillibrand led 25 senators—including herself and the top Democrat on the Senate Armed Services Committee, Jack Reed—in "continuing to demand answers" from the DoD. The letter asked Hegseth and CENTCOM Commander Admiral Brad Cooper to release their department's "long-awaited report" on the strike. In addition to requesting the findings of the report, the senators called on CENTCOM to present measures preventing a repeat civilian casualty incident.

Hegseth addressing Massie's impeachment efforts during a press conference on 10 November 2026

The attack was also cited by Representative Thomas Massie in the fourth article of impeachment he introduced against Secretary of Defense Pete Hegseth on 9 November 2026. Massie's resolution alleged that changes to the Department of Defense's civilian-protection systems under Hegseth had contributed to the deaths and injuries at the school. Speaking to reporters at the US Capitol, Massie said, "There's no fog of war on the first day." The Pentagon had not formally accepted responsibility for the strike and said that its investigation was ongoing. On 9 November, Representative Thomas Massie introduced articles of impeachment against Secretary of Defense Peth Hegseth. Article IV specifically references the Minab school attack.

===== Public and organizations =====
The Center on Conscience & War reported that hotline callers often cited the Minab school attack when showing anti-war sentiments.

==== Israel ====
It was publicly reported on 4 March that Israel had begun investigating. The same day, Israel Defense Forces (IDF) spokesperson, lieutenant colonel Nadav Shoshani, said Israel did not know who was responsible for the airstrike and said the IDF was not aware of any IDF operation within the region.

==== Intergovernmental organizations ====
A number of UN agencies spoke up shortly after the attack. The first UN agency to condemn the airstrike was UNESCO, which called it "a grave violation of humanitarian law" the day of the attack. UNSG António Guterres followed up shortly after, also condemning the airstrike. On 4 March, a panel of 18 independent experts on the UN Committee on ‌the Rights of the Child said it was "alarmed" by news of the strike and said children must be protected from war. The UN human rights office, avoiding attribution of blame, said "the forces behind a deadly attack on a girls' school in Iran" must investigate the airstrike and report its findings. The same day, its high commissioner, Volker Türk, called for a prompt, impartial, and thorough investigation. On 7 March, UNICEF called on all parties in the conflict to ensure the protection of civilians, noting the death of children in the strike.

In July 2026, UN human rights experts stated that, five months after the bombing of the Minab school, the US and Israel had still not released the results of their investigation into the incident. Regarding the failure to publish the results therefrom, at that point raised questions about the transparency and impartiality of the investigation—the experts said “justice delayed is justice denied.” They also considered the Minab school attack a prominent example of the failure of the US and Israel to protect civilians, including women and children, during armed conflict.

==== Human rights activists and organizations ====
The Euro-Mediterranean Human Rights Monitor described the attack as a "horrific crime and a consolidation of the collapse of civilian protection", and said that any attack on "protected persons" such as children and teaching staff constitutes a serious violation of international humanitarian law. The Norway-based human rights group, Hengaw, said it was seeking the names of victims of the attack, adding that "the establishment and expansion of military facilities in close proximity to schools and public spaces place civilians at heightened risk."

Open-source researcher for the HRW Digital Investigation Lab, Sophia Jones, said that "a prompt and thorough investigation is needed into this attack, including if those responsible should have known that a school was there and that it would be full of children and their teachers before midday", adding that "those responsible for an unlawful attack should be held to account, including prosecutions of anyone responsible for war crimes". Its Washington director, Sarah Yager, said that "even if those responsible for the strike did not deliberately target a school full of children, the US military has an obligation to take all feasible precautions to avoid civilian harm, which it clearly did not do in this case". Yager argued that the US reckoning with its accountability for the attack was also important for ensuring that "this never happens again". HRW said, however, that if any buildings within the adjacent base were used for military purposes, the school would have been placed "at unnecessary risk" by Iranian authorities, in violation of the laws of war.

Amnesty International’s Senior Director of Research, Advocacy, Policy and Campaigns, Erika Guevara Rosas, said that "this harrowing attack on a school, with classrooms full of children, is a sickening illustration of the catastrophic and entirely predictable price civilians are paying during this armed conflict". Arguing that the US "could and should" have known the building was a school, Guevara-Rosas alleged the strike was "strictly prohibited under international humanitarian law". Like HRW, Amnesty called for impartial, transparent investigation from the US, but instead argued that whether the building was struck with people inside, without people inside, or strikes fell in the adjacent IRGC compound, civilians could, would, and did fall at risk, thus constituting some illegal international action.

Pakistani human rights activist Malala Yousafzai, a United Nations Messenger of Peace and Nobel Peace laureate, said that news of the airstrike left her "heartbroken and appalled". Yousafzai condemned the killings of civilians, particularly those of children.

Human Rights Watch reported that the attack on the Shajareh Tayyebeh Primary School in Minab, Iran should be investigated as a potential war crime, citing evidence suggesting the use of precision-guided munitions and no indication that the school was used for military purposes. It called for an independent investigation and accountability for those responsible, concluding that the incident may constitute a violation of the laws of war.

==== Others ====
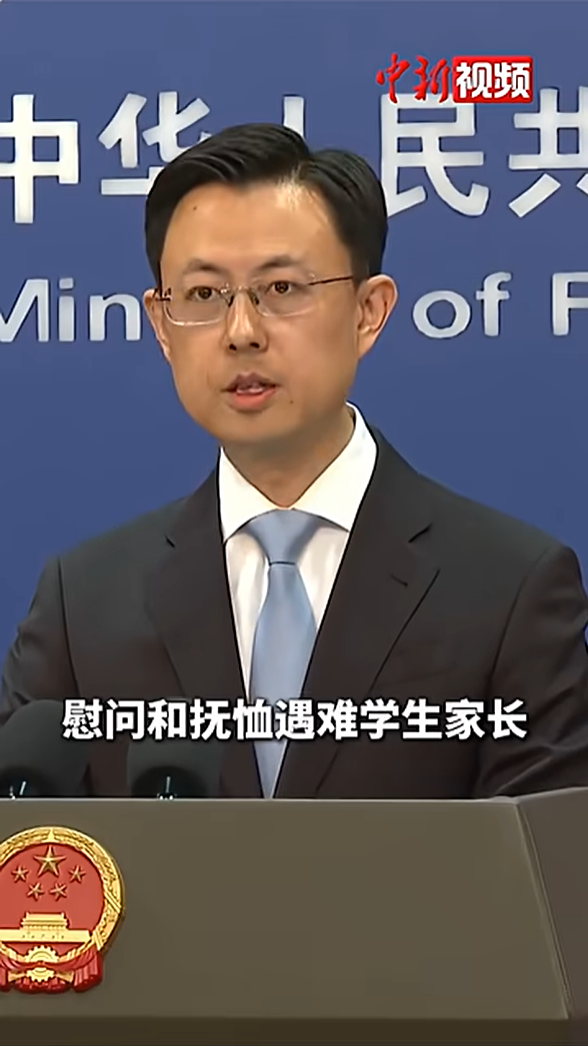
Chinese foreign ministry spokesman Guo Jiakun speaking at the 13 March press conference

- China: On 13 March, Chinese foreign ministry spokesman Guo Jiakun offered condolences to victims before pledging to donate US$200,000 in emergency humanitarian assistance to the Iranian Red Cross through its own Red Cross Society, serving as further "condolences and compensation" to the injured persons and families of victims. In the regular press briefing, Guo added that the attack "constitute[d] an even graver violation of international humanitarian law and cross[ed] the bottom line of human conscience and morality", (Note: Chinese: 袭击学校、伤害儿童更严重违背国际人道法，突破人类道德良知底线.) before adding that China "stands ready to continue providing necessary assistance to Iran in a humanitarian spirit to support the Iranian people through this difficult time".
- Italy: On 11 March, Italian Prime Minister Giorgia Meloni condemned the attack, labelling it a "massacre". Speaking in front of the country's parliament building in Rome, Meloni said the strike fell "outside the scope of international law," and "request[ed] that the responsibilities for this tragedy be quickly established.
- Slovakia: Slovak Member of the European Parliament (EP), Milan Uhrík, attended a memorial gathering outside the Iranian Embassy in Brussels following the attack. Uhrík called for an independent investigation into the incident and stated that the attack appeared to have been “premeditated”. He further described the strike as a possible war crime and urged an impartial inquiry into the circumstances surrounding the attack.
- Thailand: The National Human Rights Commission of Thailand condemned the attack on the Minab school.

== Misinformation ==
Following the attack, Israeli and Iranian pro-monarchist opposition pages began disseminating disinformation that the airstrike was a failed Islamic Revolutionary Guard Corps (IRGC) interception. These claims, originating from associated Telegram channels, were debunked by news organizations, with photographs used as supposed evidence of an IRGC misfire having actually been taken in the city of Zanjan, 1,600 kilometres (990 mi) away from Minab. Other social media accounts claimed the footage was supposedly older footage shot in Pakistan, which has been debunked. The NYT stated that "a single errant missile wouldn't have caused such precise and targeted damage to several buildings across the naval base". It was also falsely claimed on the social media website X that the IRGC had admitted to mistakenly destroying the school in a missile airstrike, despite the fact that no such statement admitting responsibility had been made by the Iranian state.

U.S. president Trump claimed, without providing evidence, that Iran possessed Tomahawk missiles, and suggested that Iranian Tomahawk missiles may have been responsible for the attack on the school. PBS fact checkers rated Trump's claim as false, noting that the U.S. is the only party in the conflict known to possess Tomahawk missiles. They also cited video evidence released by CENTCOM, showing that the U.S. Navy had launched several Tomahawks on 28 February, the same day the school was struck. A preliminary investigation by the US military further contradicted Trump's assertions, concluding that the attack was likely the result of a U.S. airstrike attacking the elementary school.

== Analysis ==
=== Targeting process and precision ===
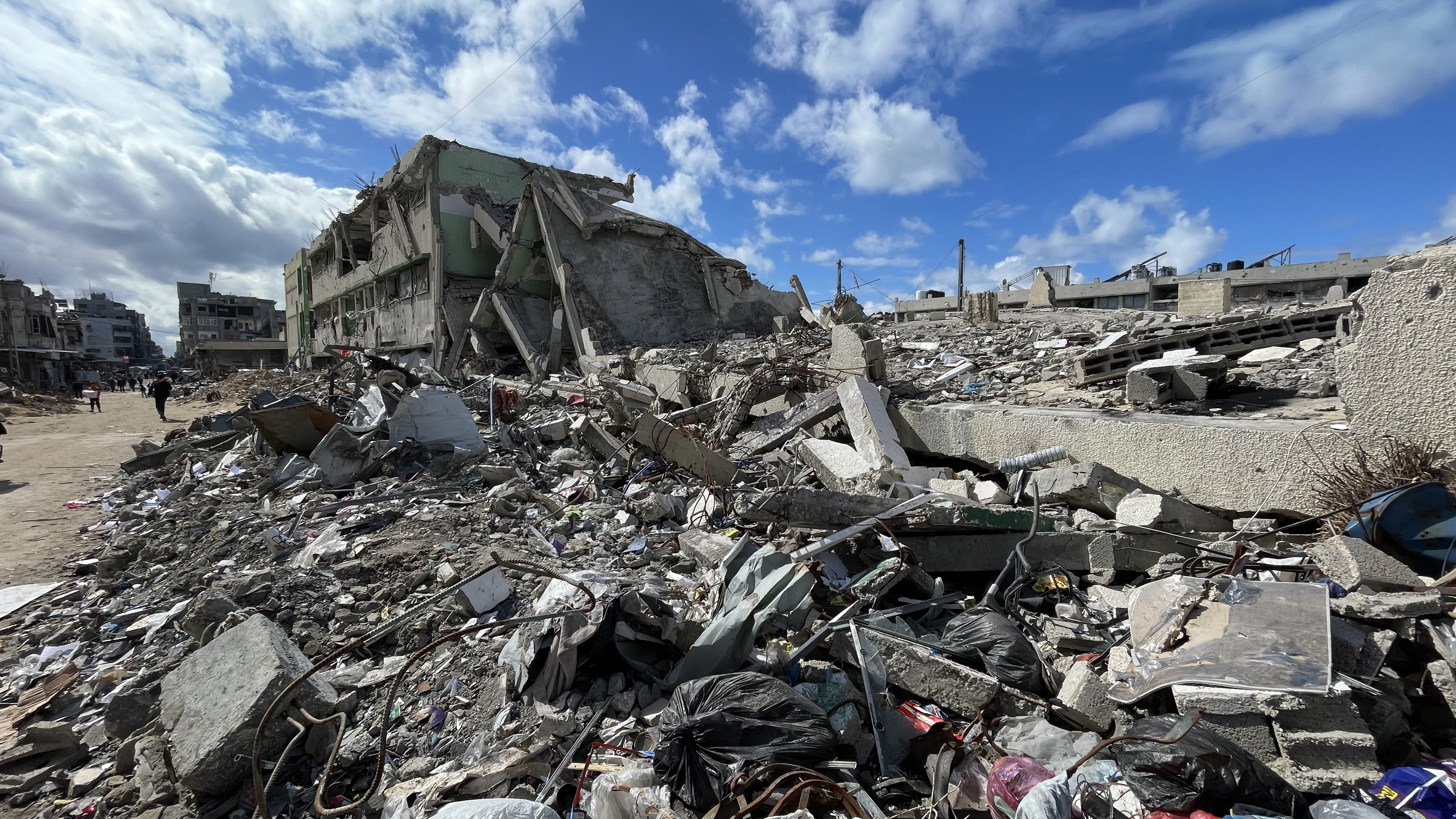
Parallels have been drawn between Israel's attacks on schools during the Israeli–Palestinian conflict with the strike on the Minab school

An initial Al Jazeera investigation into the airstrike concluded that the attack was either based on "outdated intelligence" from before 2013, and would thus "constitute grave negligence," or that the attack was intentional and done "to inflict maximum societal shock and undermine popular support for Iran's military establishment," The investigation also linked the attack and subsequent misinformation to similar attacks targeting civilian facilities by the US and Israel, such as the Bahr El-Baqar primary school bombing (1970), Amiriyah shelter bombing (1991), Qana massacre (1996), Kunduz hospital airstrike (2015), and Israeli attacks on schools during the Gaza war (since 2023). A Reuters investigation called into question the vetting processes for reviewing strike locations given reports of the US' potential use of outdated information, visibility from satellite imagery, and online presence.

Experts speaking to NPR corroborated the airstrike's precision. Researchers at Oregon State University's Conflict Ecology Laboratory, Corey Scher and Jamon Van Den Hoek, noted that the detonation centroids were "pretty clean." Satellite imagery specialist Jeffrey Lewis agreed that the airstrikes were precision airstrikes but added that the strike being an error was more likely. A later HRW report published satellite imagery showing damaged roofs of buildings within the compound, where "relatively small circular" entry points through the roofs demonstrated the munitions' precise nature.

==== Tagging, verification, and use of artificial intelligence ====
An example of Project Maven's analyst view for reviewing targets

Two people familiar with the logistics of the strike told The Washington Post that intelligence had tagged the school as either a factory or arms depot before approving it as an airstrike target. Numerous reports, outlets, and US senators raised concerns over the use of artificial intelligence (AI) tools, including Palantir's Maven Smart System and Claude systems. One US-based source familiar with the process revealed that these systems were used to process vast amounts of data during the US's operations during the Iran war. Furthermore, these AI tools are able to "evaluate a strike after it is initiated". This opened the possibility for the strike being caused by these AI tools, either in part or without any further verification. Many of these sources also raised concerns over who or what should be held responsible in cases like the one against the school.

=== Responsibility, intentionality, and weaponry ===
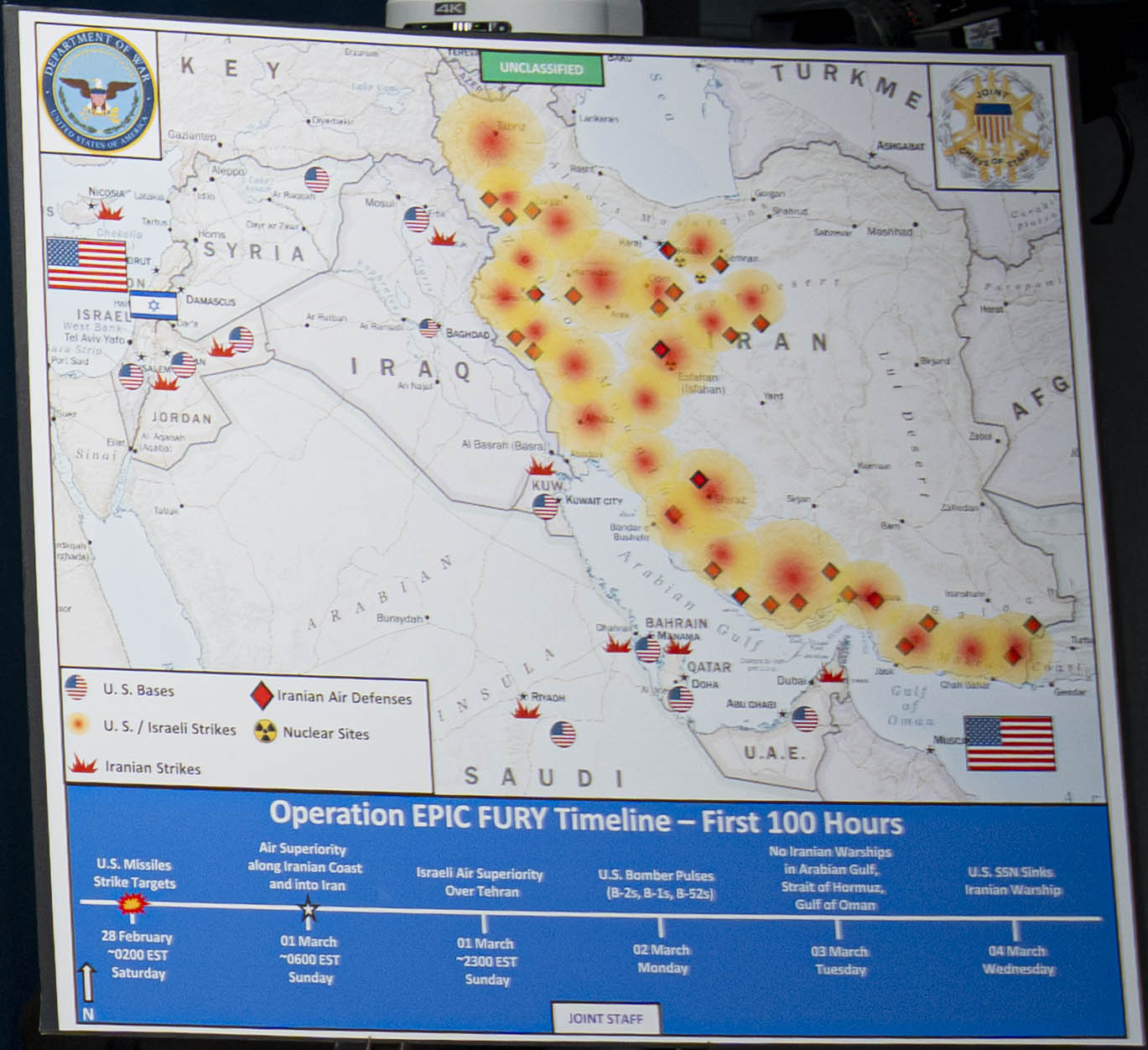
Map presented by the DoD of the "First 100 Hours" of its strikes in Iran includes a circle centered on Minab

Shortly after the strike, satellite imagery specialist, Jeffrey Lewis, said the US was more likely than Israel to be responsible for the strike based on Minab's location as related to where the US had been striking. After the first day of strikes, the US published a map of its strikes in Iran, which included a point on Minab; the US and Israel had divided their strikes geographically, with the US responsible for striking targets in southern Iran where the school was located. Investigations by the CBC and NPR corroborated Lewis' analysis, finding that the area where the school is located was the target of more than one precision strike, with imagery showing multiple craters and plumes of smoke present. Both investigations suggested that the strike was likely the result of a failure in intelligence gathering. An investigation by the NYT also concluded that the school was likely hit by a US precision strike.

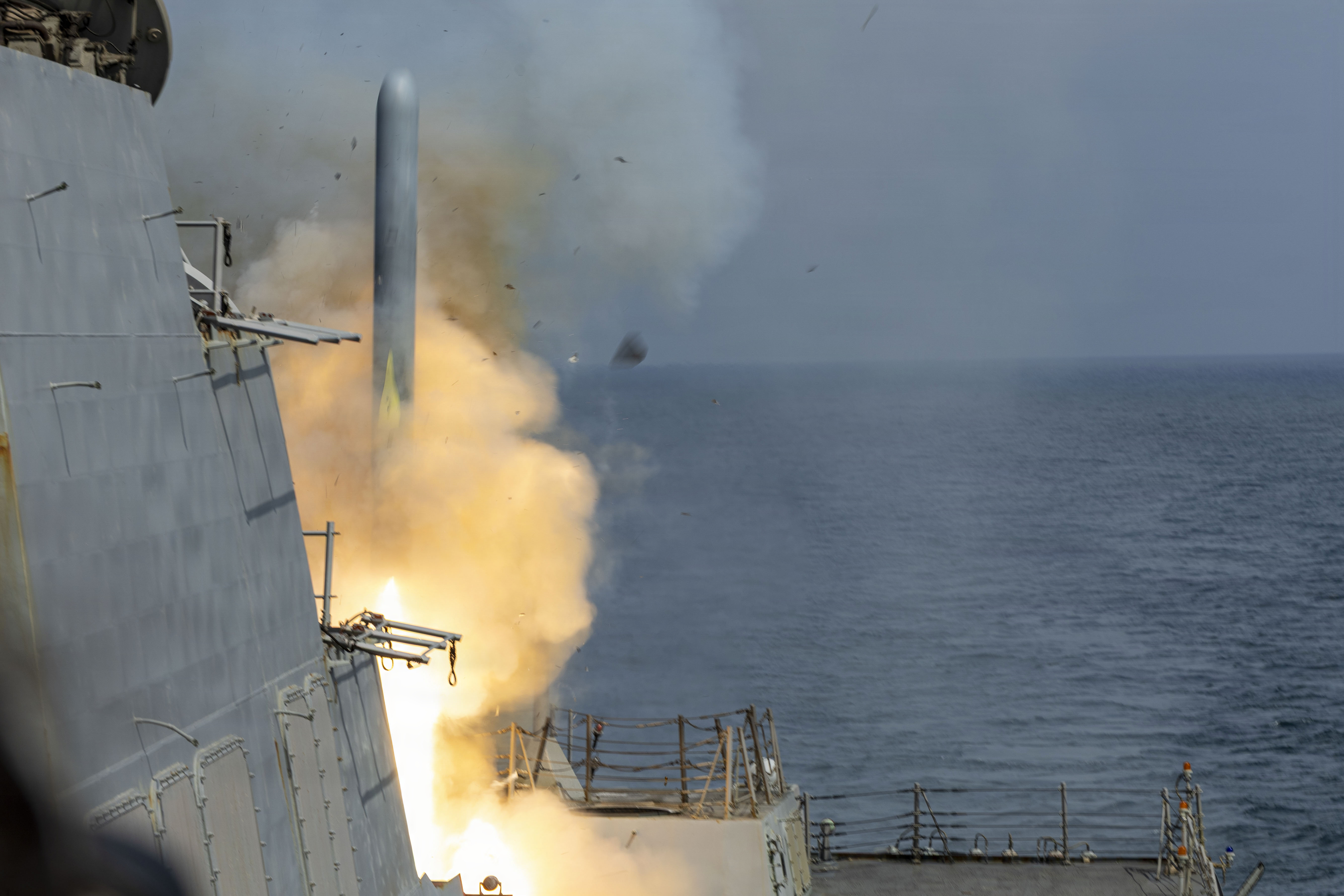
An American destroyer firing a TLAM as part of Operation Epic Fury on the first day of strikes, 28 February

The CBC and NPR investigation also found that the school and surrounding complex fell under the area of operations of the US military, with verified US airstrikes having taken place nearby. Later investigations by Bellingcat and BBC Verify geolocated footage released by Mehr, showing a subsonic cruise missile identified by both as an American RGM/UGM-109 Tomahawk Land Attack Missile (TLAM) striking the area near the school shortly after it hit. The missile being a Tomahawk was confirmed by numerous other munition experts, including Sam Lair of the James Martin Center for Nonproliferation Studies (CNS), Director of Armament Research Services (ARES) N.R. Jenzen-Jones, U.S. Air Force Special Operations targeting expert Wes Bryant, an anonymous former Navy official who helped develop the Tomahawk program, among others. Furthermore, the US was the only participant in the conflict to use the Tomahawk missile—with Lewis, Jenzen-Jones, and others saying the missile in the footage did not match any known weapons possessed by Iran. Jenzen-Jones expanded that "despite various claims circulating online, the munition in question is clearly not an Iranian Soumar missile." Many of these sources, including Bellingcat, added that the footage having confirmed the US' striking of areas within the vicinity of the school contradicted Trump's claim that an Iranian missile hit the school. Despite being preprogrammed with target locations and flight path auto-adjustment capabilities, TLAMs are equipped with cameras which send images to operators. Operators can change its target and direction mid-flight.

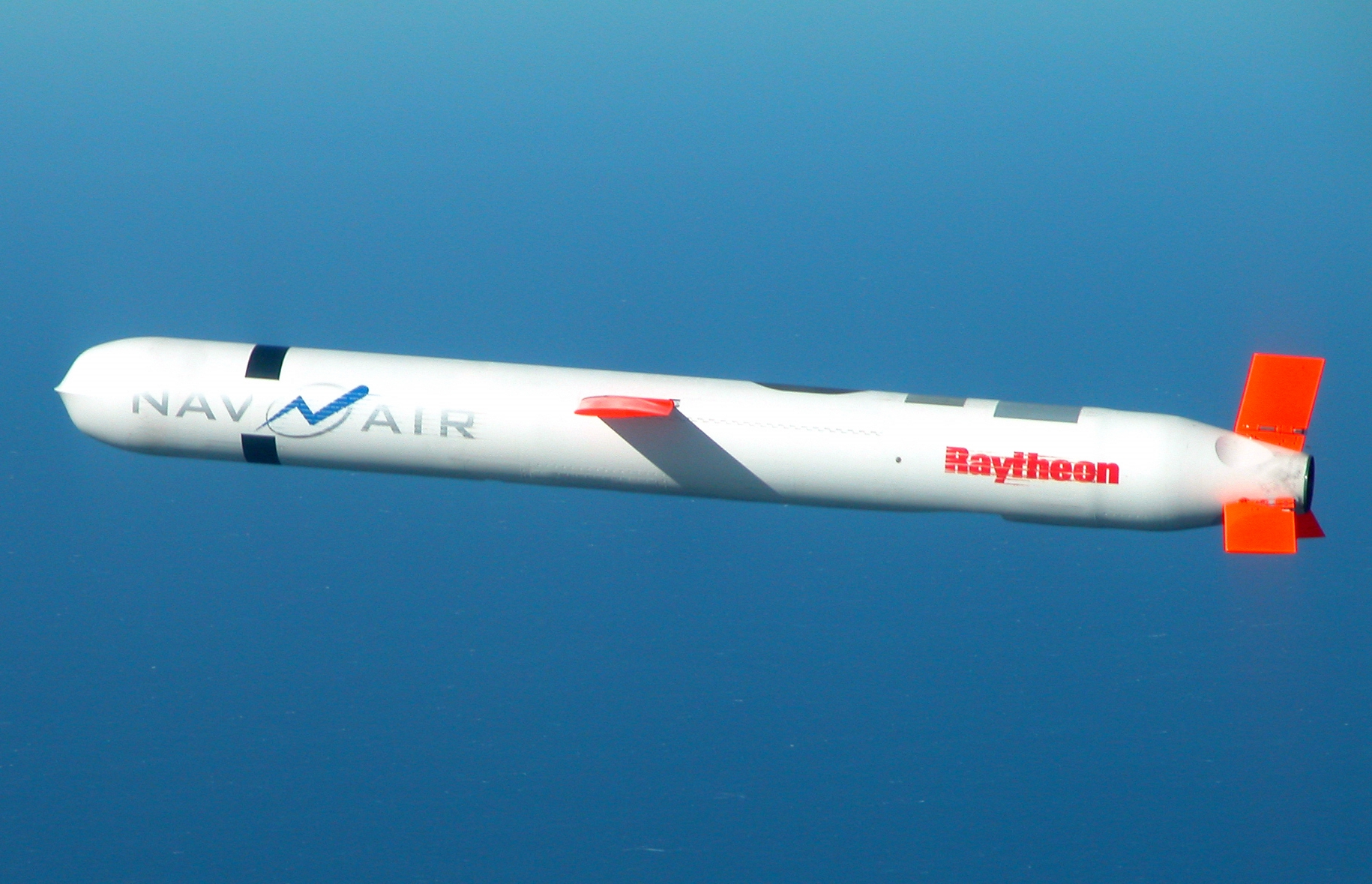
Since 2002, operators are able to reprogram the missile while in-flight, including the capability to loiter over the target area for some hours

A CBC investigation concluded that the school was bombed as part of a precision airstrike against the military complex adjacent to the targeted building and that it was not a mistake. It said the impact on the school demonstrated that it was either a weapons system failure or a serious CENTCOM intelligence gathering error, adding that the US primarily targeted military bases and missile launchers in southern and central Iran. Israel, on the other hand, was focusing its operations in the north saying that "Minab's location in the south, near the Strait of Hormuz, places it within the US military's primary area of operations and lines up with other US strikes on the Bandar Abbas Naval Base, about 80 kilometres west of Minab, and facilities in Konarak, which is 400 kilometres to the southeast."

Photographs of missile fragments released by Islamic Republic of Iran Broadcasting alongside independent video, satellite and debris analysis has consistently identified the munition as a Tomahawk cruise missile. A satellite data link antenna was recovered from the site which was imprinted with the name of Colorado-based manufacturer, Ball Aerospace & Technologies, owned by British arms-manufacturer BAE Systems. Further analysis of the debris connects it to a contract issued by the United States Naval Air Systems Command to contractor Raytheon on 24 September 2014 for the production of 231 Tomahawk Block IV missiles for $251,133,201.

=== Legality ===
Shannon Bosch, an associate professor of law at Edith Cowan University, analyzed the strike from the perspective of international humanitarian law (IHL). Without drawing firm conclusions, Bosch noted that schools and children under 18 are especially protected under IHL, concluding that "the legality of that strike turns on whether the expected harm to children and the school was excessive compared to the military advantage gained by striking the target". UN human rights experts characterized the strike as a potential war crime under the Rome Statute. Regarding the attack, international humanitarian law expert Janina Dill said that attackers are required to "verify the status" of targets to avoid harming civilians. Beth Van Schaack said that the US "should have known that a school was in the vicinity". HRW said the same, adding that beyond the laws of war requiring precise intelligence, the strike's proximity to civilian infrastructure required advanced notice.

Oona Hathaway, a legal scholar at Yale University and then president-elect of the American Society of International Law, said that the attack on Iran "appeared to violate international law" because it lacked UN approval and was not necessary for immediate self-defense. Regarding the school strike specifically, Hathaway said that it would not necessarily be a war crime if it was an honest mistake, but that if old targeting data reflected "a reckless lack of care", it might rise to one.

=== Media coverage ===
Polish journalist Mariusz Zawadzki, writing for Gazeta Wyborcza, stated that in the week after the attack, the event was being mostly ignored by Western media. Following the attack, the Iranian Revayat-e Fath Institute created an AI-generated Lego-styled video of the Iranian military attacking neighboring countries and Israeli and American military outposts. The video was declared to be in remembrance of the victims of the Minab school attack, and it was redistributed by various government-run outlets and the Ministry of Foreign Affairs.

== See also ==
- List of massacres in Iran
- List of school-related attacks
  - List of school massacres by death toll
  - List of attacks related to primary schools
- Outline of the 2026 Iran war
  - Timeline of the 2026 Iran war
- United States war crimes
  - US war crimes in Iran strikes
    - 2026 Lamerd sports hall attack, sports hall in southern Iran struck by the US shortly after the Minab attack
    - 2026 Kuhestak wedding airstrike, building hosting a wedding struck by the US in September 2026
  - Iran Air Flight 655, civilian passenger airliner shot down in 1988 by the United States Navy
