= Casualties of the 2026 Iran war =

The 2026 Iran war has resulted in thousands of deaths and tens of thousands of injuries, mostly in Iran, Lebanon and Yemen, but also in Jordan, Syria, Israel, Palestine, Azerbaijan and countries around the Persian Gulf (particularly Iraq, Kuwait, Oman, Saudi Arabia, Qatar, Bahrain and the United Arab Emirates). Casualties in these countries have included a diverse range of nationalities. Various sources have provided casualty estimates that have not been finalized/verified.

== Total ==
Casualties by country
Country	Killed	Injured	Prisoner-of-war
Total	8,000–10,600	48,775–54,805	3
Iran	3,684 (HRANA); 3,528 (MOHME); 3,375 (WHO/OCHA); 7,650 (Hengaw); 6,000 (IDF)	33,000 (MOHME); 33,806 (WHO/OCHA); 15,000 (IDF)	3
Lebanon	4,386 (Lebanese Health Ministry); 1,000 (Hezbollah); 2,500 (IDF)	12,407 (Lebanese Health Ministry); 10,000 (IDF)	
Yemen	1,282 (Yemeni Health Ministry); 1,600 (PLC/NRF); 959 (WHO)	5,890 (Yemeni Health Ministry); 1,500 (PLC/NRF); 4,207 (WHO)	
Iraq	146 (Note: See Casualties of the 2026 Iran war#Iraq)	525	
Israel	73	7,841	
Saudi Arabia	31	473	
United States	23 (CENTCOM/DOD); 26 (Independent estimates) (Note: Including three civilian contractors killed and at least five injured during Iranian and PMF strikes.)	865 (CENTCOM/DOD); 900 (Independent estimates)	
United Arab Emirates	15	245	
Oman	14	35	
Kuwait	12	190	
Palestine	4	13	
Syria	4	6	
Bahrain	2	51	
Qatar	1	21	
French military	1	7	
British military	1	0	
Jordan	0	29	
Azerbaijan	0	4	
United Nations Interim Force in Lebanon
Indonesia	4	5	
France	2	2	
Serbia	1	0	
Ghana	0	4	
Malaysia	0	2	
Spain	0	1	
El Salvador	0	1	
Poland	0	1	
Nepal	0	1	

== Iran ==
As of 7 April, Human Rights Activists in Iran (HRANA), a US-based non-governmental organization, documented 3,636 deaths in Iran due to strikes, including 1,701 civilians, 1,221 military personnel, and 714 unclassified. According to HRANA, "[i]t is believed that military casualties are significantly higher than the figures reported in [its] reports" as confirmations depend largely on government data that are obscured "due to the sensitive nature of military information". Because of HRANA's limited access "to locations where military forces are present, [its count] largely reflects reports of senior officers or military personnel who were present in urban areas." An additional 48 people were documented by HRANA to have been killed between 8 and 17 July, including 20 civilians.

=== Military and officials ===
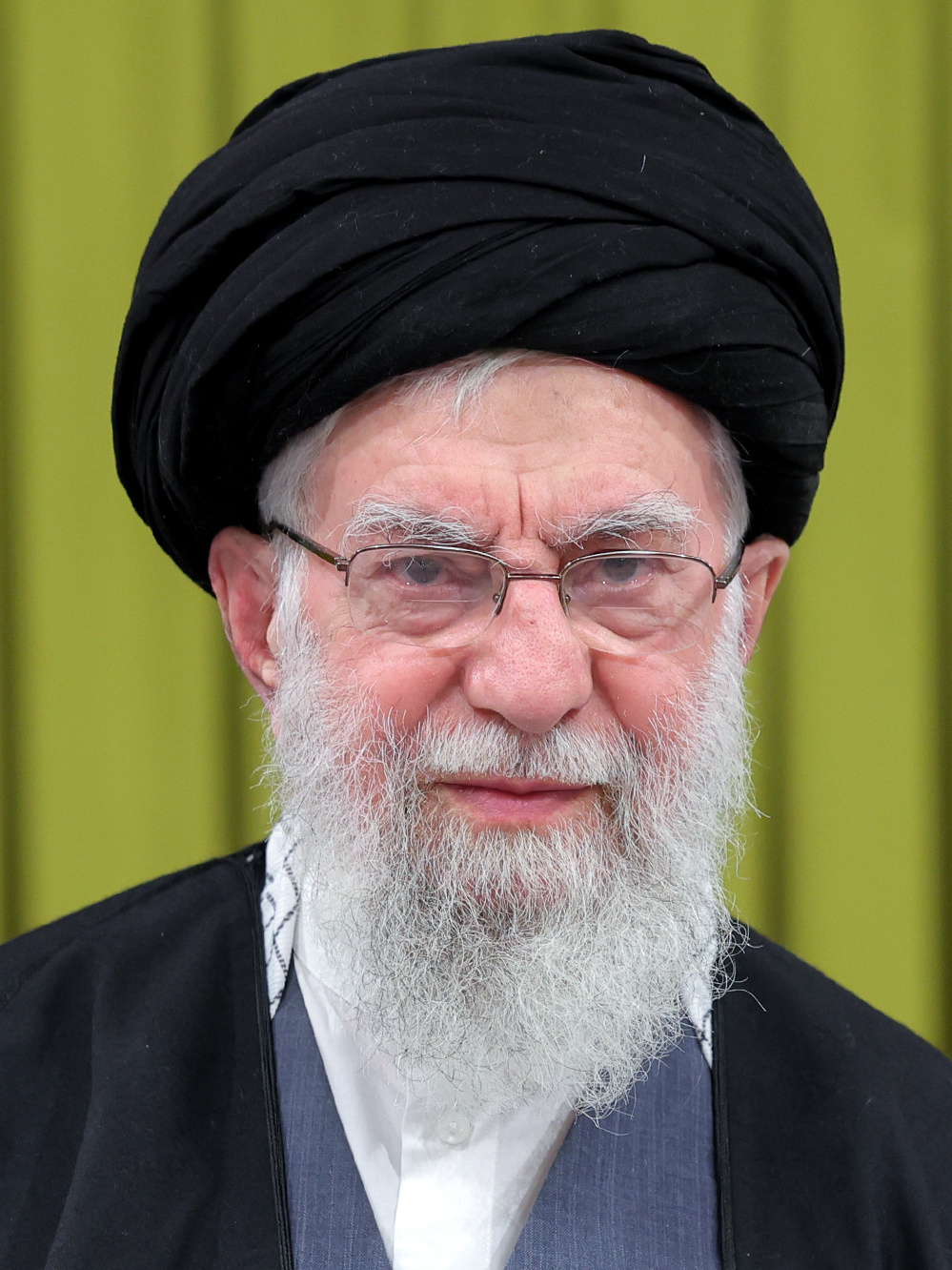
Khamenei on 12 February 2026, 16 days before his assassination

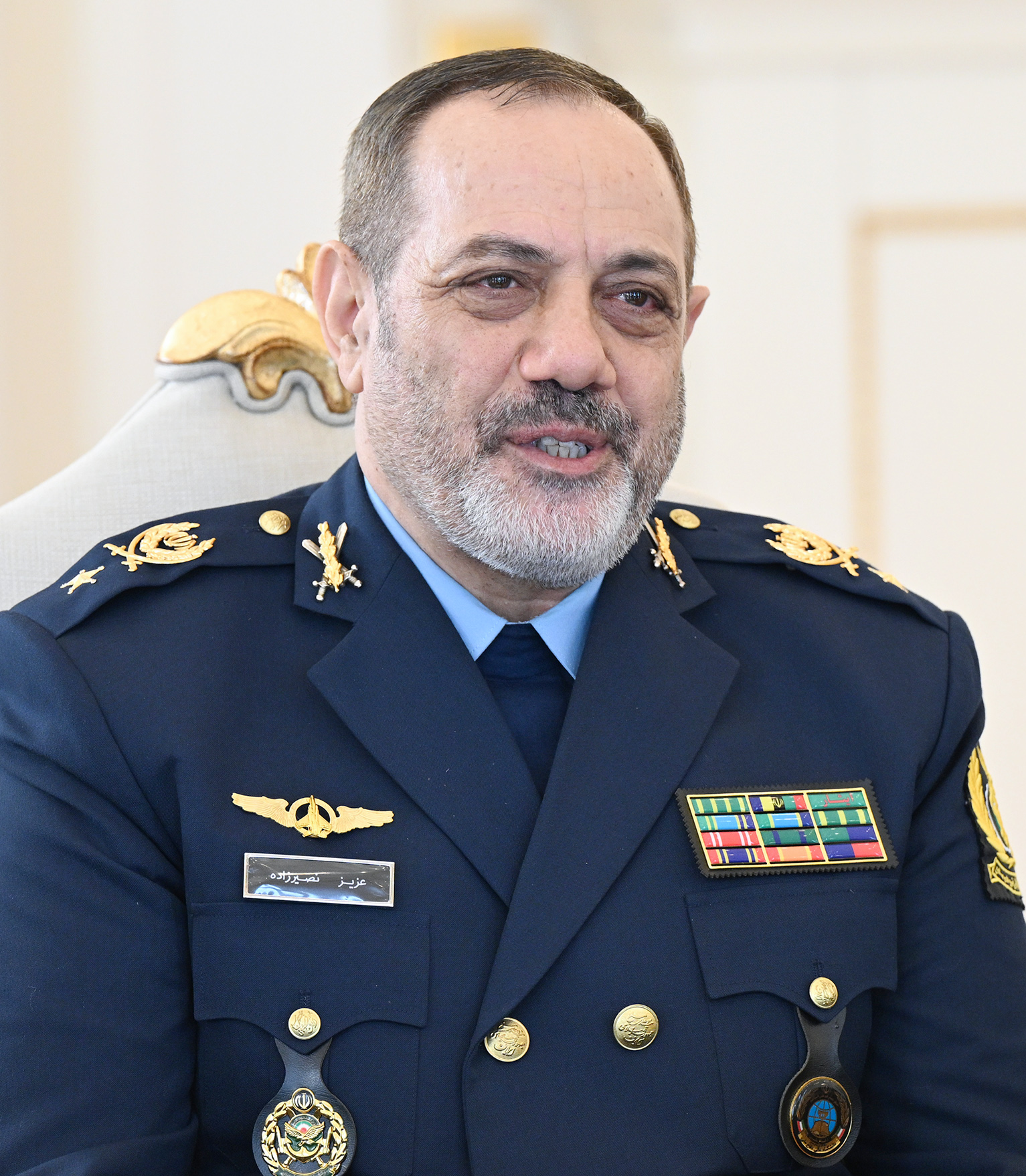
Minister of Defense Aziz Nasirzadeh

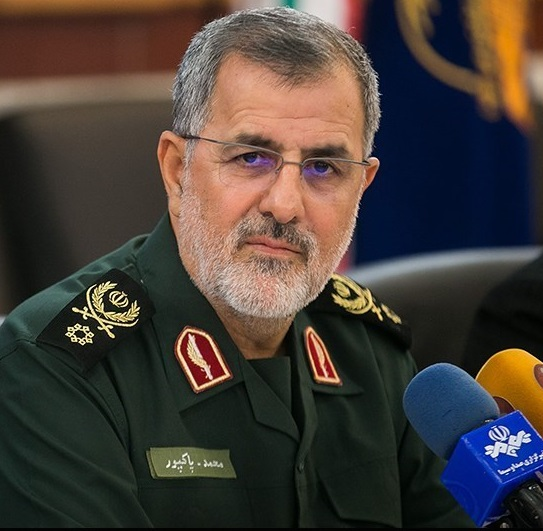
IRGC commander Mohammad Pakpour

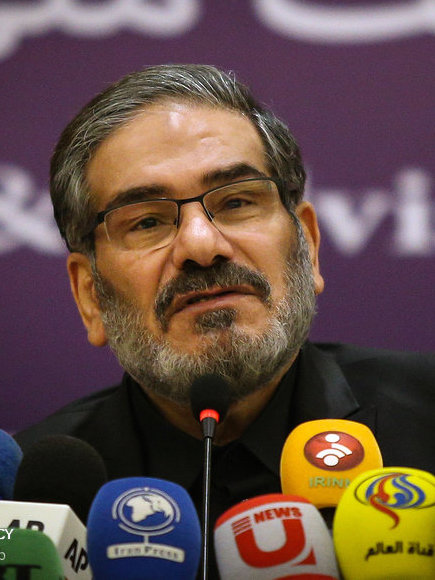
Secretary of the Defense Council Ali Shamkhani

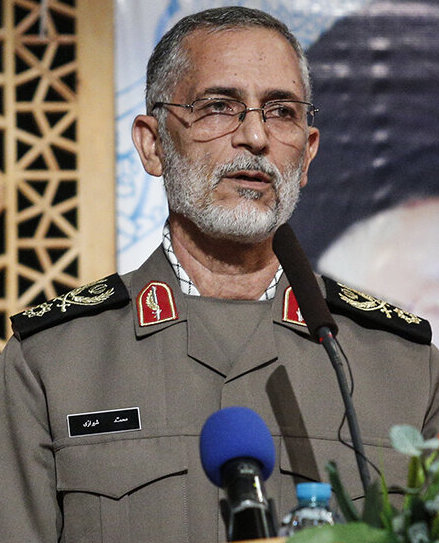
Head of the Military Office of the Supreme Leader Mohammad Shirazi

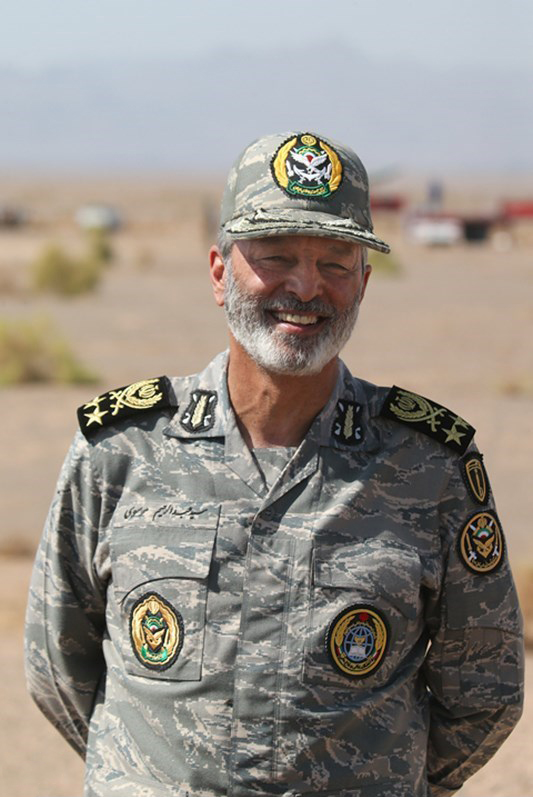
Chief of staff of the Armed Forces Abdolrahim Mousavi

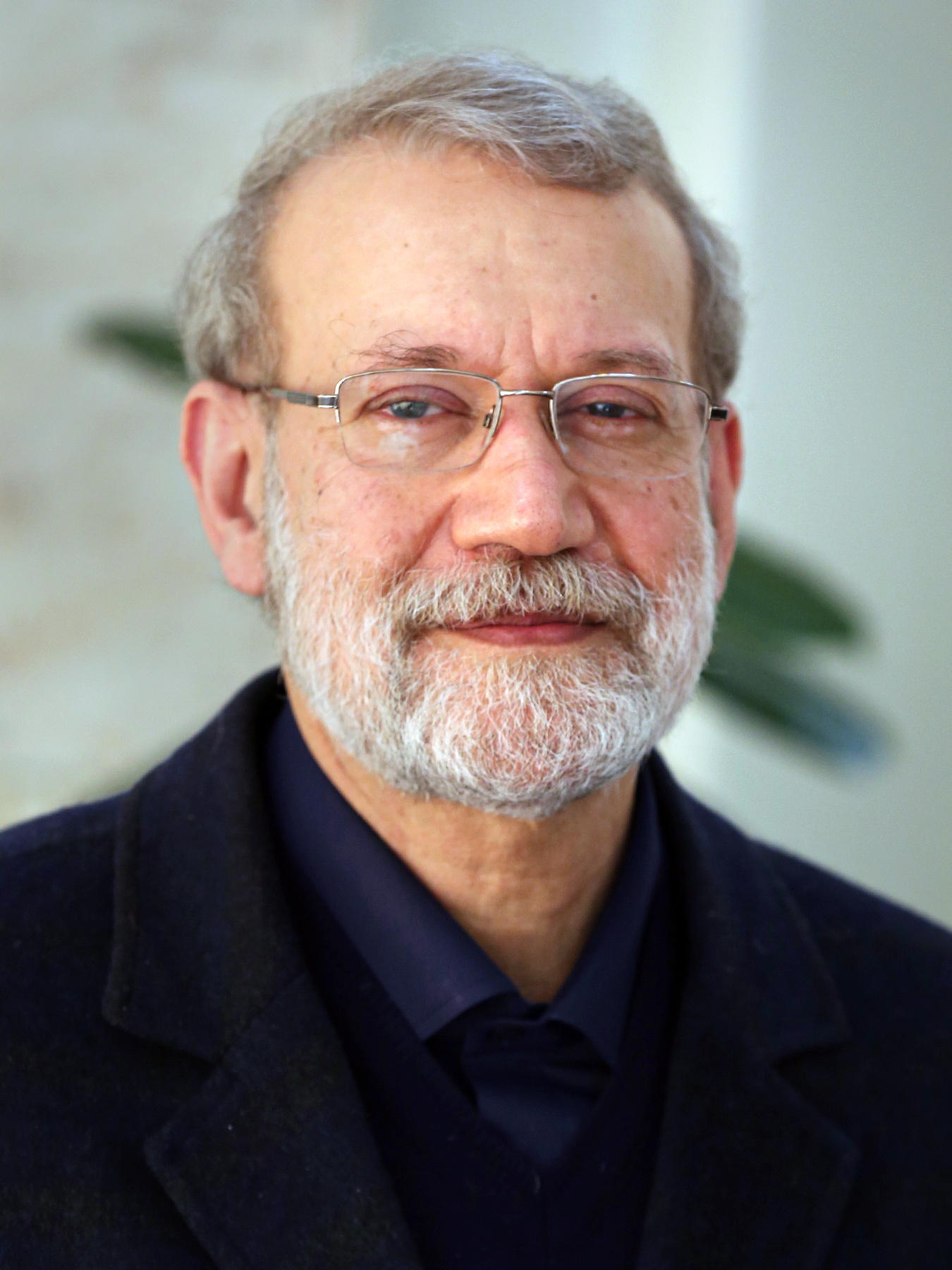
Secretary of the Supreme National Security Council Ali Larijani

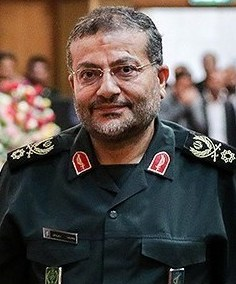
Head of the paramilitary Basij forces Gholamreza Soleimani

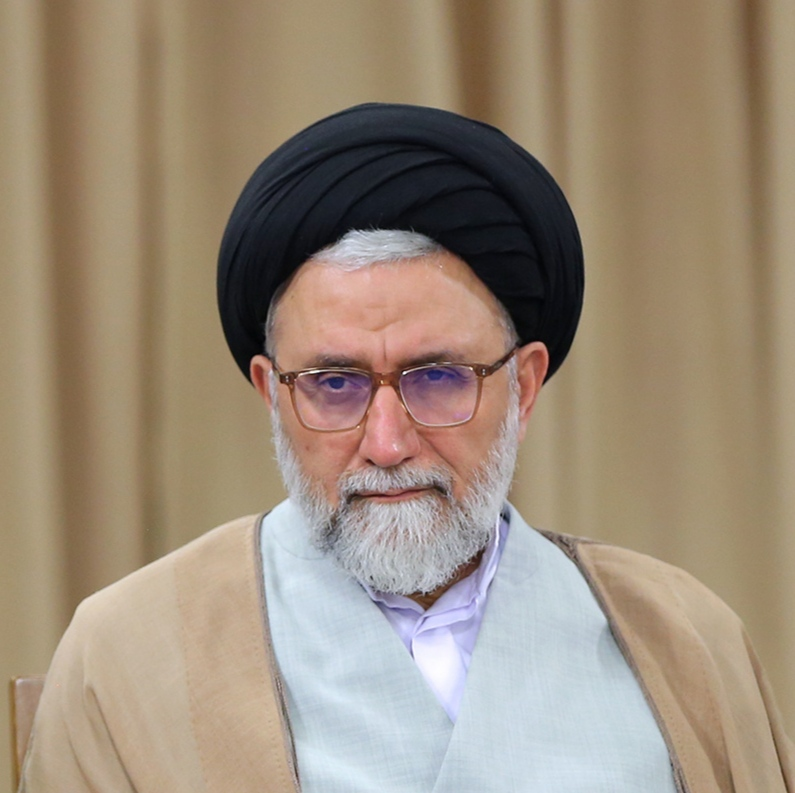
Minister of Intelligence Esmaeil Khatib

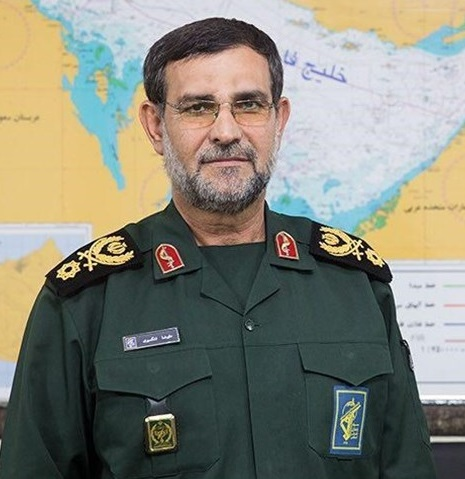
Commander of the IRGC Navy Alireza Tangsiri

On 28 February 2026, Ali Khamenei, the supreme leader of Iran, was assassinated in an Israeli air attack on his compound. Early on 1 March, Iranian state media announced that Khamenei had been killed. The Fars News Agency, which is controlled by the Islamic Revolutionary Guard Corps (IRGC), announced that Khamenei's daughter, son-in-law, grandchild, and daughter-in-law Zahra Haddad-Adel had been killed. The Iranian government declared 40 days of mourning.

Iranian defense minister Aziz Nasirzadeh and IRGC commander Mohammad Pakpour were killed by Israeli airstrikes. Defence Council secretary Ali Shamkhani was killed along with four top Ministry of Intelligence officials. The IDF later stated that it had confirmed the deaths of seven Iranian security leaders, including Shamkhani, Nasirzadeh, and Pakpour.

Additional senior officials confirmed to have been killed were Salah Asadi, head of intelligence for Iran's emergency command, Mohammad Shirazi, head of the military office of Khamenei, and Hossein Jabal Amelian and Reza Mozaffari Nia, incumbent and former heads of the Organization of Defensive Innovation and Research, respectively. On 1 March, chief of staff Abdolrahim Mousavi and former president Mahmoud Ahmadinejad were reported by Iranian state media to have also been killed by strikes. However, later reports confirmed that Ahmadinejad was alive.

On 17 March, Israel assassinated Ali Larijani, secretary of Iran's Supreme National Security Council. This was confirmed by Iran. His assassination caused anxiety among Iranian officials who were concerned "that Israel would not stop until all of Iran's leaders were killed and the Islamic Republic toppled" as well as questions over who would be targeted next.

On 6 April, the head of the IRGC's intelligence organisation, Major General Majid Khademi, was assassinated in a joint US-Israeli airstrike, according to the IRGC.

On 28 February, intelligence and military sources said to CBS News that 40 Iranian officials had been killed in the strikes but that they were not "clear whether these officials were in one location or multiple locations". Israel's Channel 12 News specified three separate locations. On 1 March, US president Donald Trump said that 48 leaders had been killed.

On 13 March, the Israel Defense Forces estimated that between 3,000 and 4,000 Iranian soldiers and commanders had been killed in the war. On 15 March, Israel Defense Forces intelligence claimed that over 6,000 members of the IRGC had been killed and about 15,000 wounded. According to Iran International, at least 4,700 Iranian security forces had been killed and 20,880 injured as of 31 March. On 8 April, the Hengaw Organization for Human Rights, a Norway-based non-governmental organization, estimated that at least 6,620 members of the Iranian military forces had been killed in the attacks, up from over 1,300 on 2 March, 2,090 on 4 March, 3,910 on 10 March, 4,420 on 14 March, 4,789 on 17 March, 5,305 on 18 March, 5,890 on 24 March, 6,180 on 28 March, and 6,410 on 2 April.

==== Iranian Kurdistan ====
According to the Hengaw, after Tehran Province the highest number of reported Iranian military casualties from the war occurred in the Kurdish provinces of Kermanshah, Kurdistan, and West Azerbaijan. On 4 March, Hengaw reported that in these provinces, including Ilam, 109 military bases and security facilities had been targeted, and approximately 400 Iranian military personnel had been killed over the preceding three days. On 10 March, Hengaw reported that 180 military bases and security facilities had been targeted and that approximately 900 Iranian military personnel had been killed in the four Kurdish provinces since the start of the war. On 2 April, Hengaw reported "heavy military casualties in Kurdistan" and alleged continued concealment of official statistics, claiming that approximately 1,600 Iranian military personnel had been killed in the Kurdish provinces.

On 6 March, Euractiv described casualties among Iranian forces in Iranian Kurdistan as "large scale."

=== Civilians ===
Civilians killed numbered 1,701 (including at least 254 children), while 714 were unclassified as of 7 April.

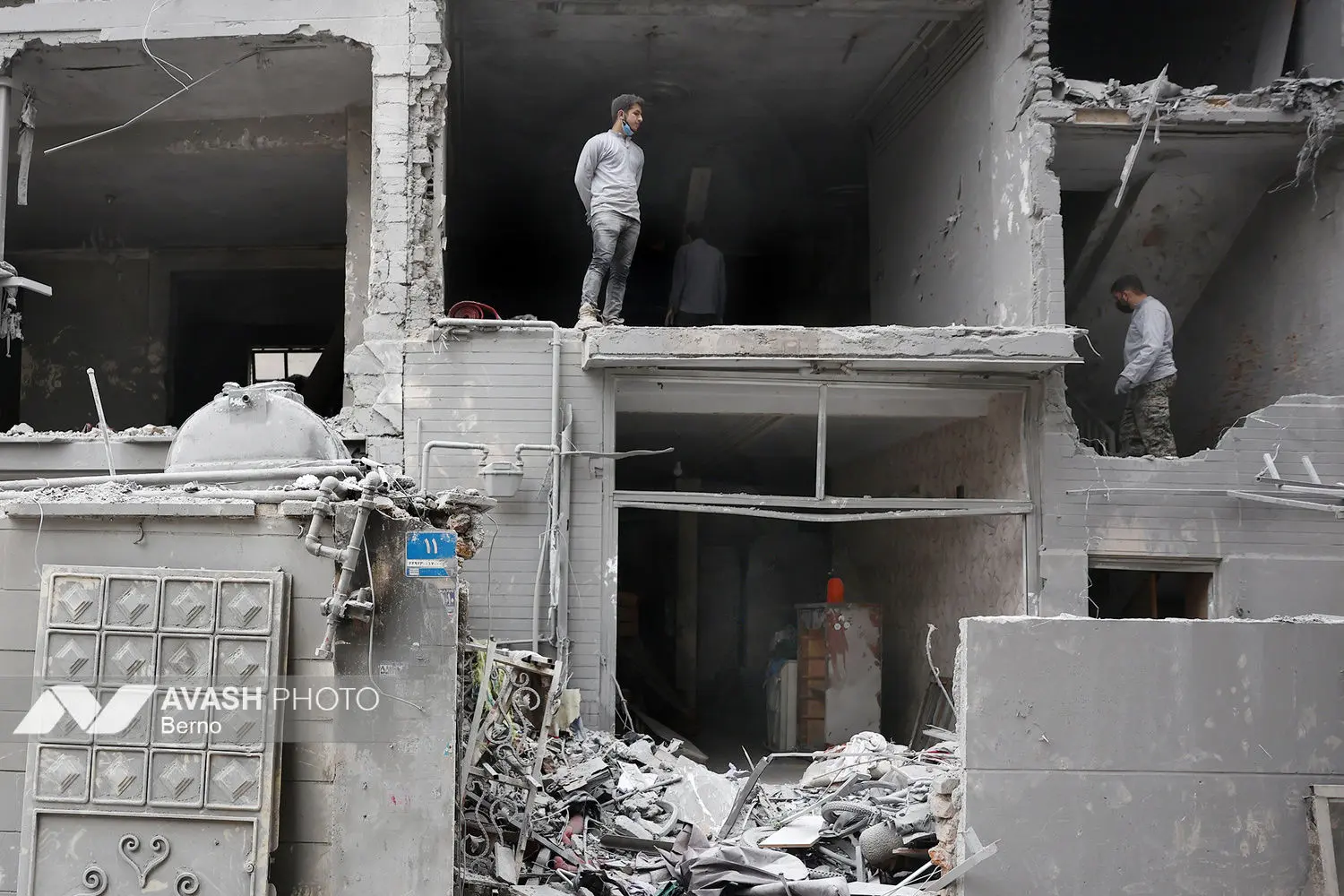
Damage to a residential structure in Tehran following aerial attacks on 15 March

At least 20 civilians, mostly families that had gathered after breaking their fast at Ramadan, were killed in Tehran's Niloofar Square on 1 or 2 March, according to semi-official Mehr News Agency. On 3 March, the Iranian Red Crescent Society said that over 600 civilians had been killed in the attacks while HRANA reported that 1,097 civilians had been killed. On 7 March, the Red Crescent reported that over 6,668 civilian units had been targeted by US-Israeli strikes, including 5,535 residential units, 1,041 commercial units, 14 medical centers, 65 schools, and 13 centers affiliated with the Red Crescent. The US reportedly used double tap airstrikes. An Israeli airstrike on 9 March in the Resalat neighborhood of Tehran destroyed a Basij-affiliated building as well as three residential buildings, resulting in 40 to 50 deaths. According to a BBC analysis, Israel used Mark 82 bombs in the attack. As of 23 March, HRANA estimated that at least 15% of the total human casualties of the war had been under the age of 18. On 15 July, Iran said that over 30 civilians were included in those killed in recent American attacks in the country's south. On the same day, the Iranian Health Ministry stated that over 260 people including at least three women and six children were injured in American attacks in Iran.

==== Minab school attack ====
On 28 February 2026, the first day of the 2026 Iran war, the United States (US) Armed Forces struck the Shajareh Tayyebeh (Note: Persian: شجرهٔ طیبه, lit. 'Sacred Tree'.) Elementary School in Minab, Hormozgan province in southern Iran with a Tomahawk missile, before following up with others in close proximity, directly killing 156 civilians, including 120 schoolchildren and 35 adults. As of 22 September 2026, the attack was the deadliest strike in terms of civilian casualties in the ongoing war; it was also the deadliest US attack on civilians in the 21st century, being the deadliest since the Amiriyah shelter bombing in 1991.

Independent investigations, satellite-based analyses, and witness accounts concluded that the school was hit by a US military strike. (Note: Those which concluded the US' responsibility in the attack include the United Nations (UN), Amnesty International, Forensic Architecture (FA) and Sky News, (Note: FA and Sky News, jointly investigating the attack, published articles on their respective channels.) Bellingcat, The New York Times (NYT), the Associated Press (AP), and others.) Sources involved with the US military's internal investigation corroborated that the strike was perpetrated by the US—being aware within hours of the strike—despite the probe not being concluded.

The attack was condemned by the Iranian government, the UN Educational, Scientific and Cultural Organization (UNESCO), the UN Secretary-General (UNSG), some of the US Congress, and other international human rights organizations and activists as a violation of international humanitarian law (IHL). A UN fact-finding mission concluded that there was reasonable grounds to believe the US committed war crimes. US congresspersons and international media outlets condemned the use of AI warfare against Iran, including the Department of Defense's (DoD) Project Maven—a target tagging system integrating elements of Palantir's Maven Smart System and Anthropic's Claude large language model.

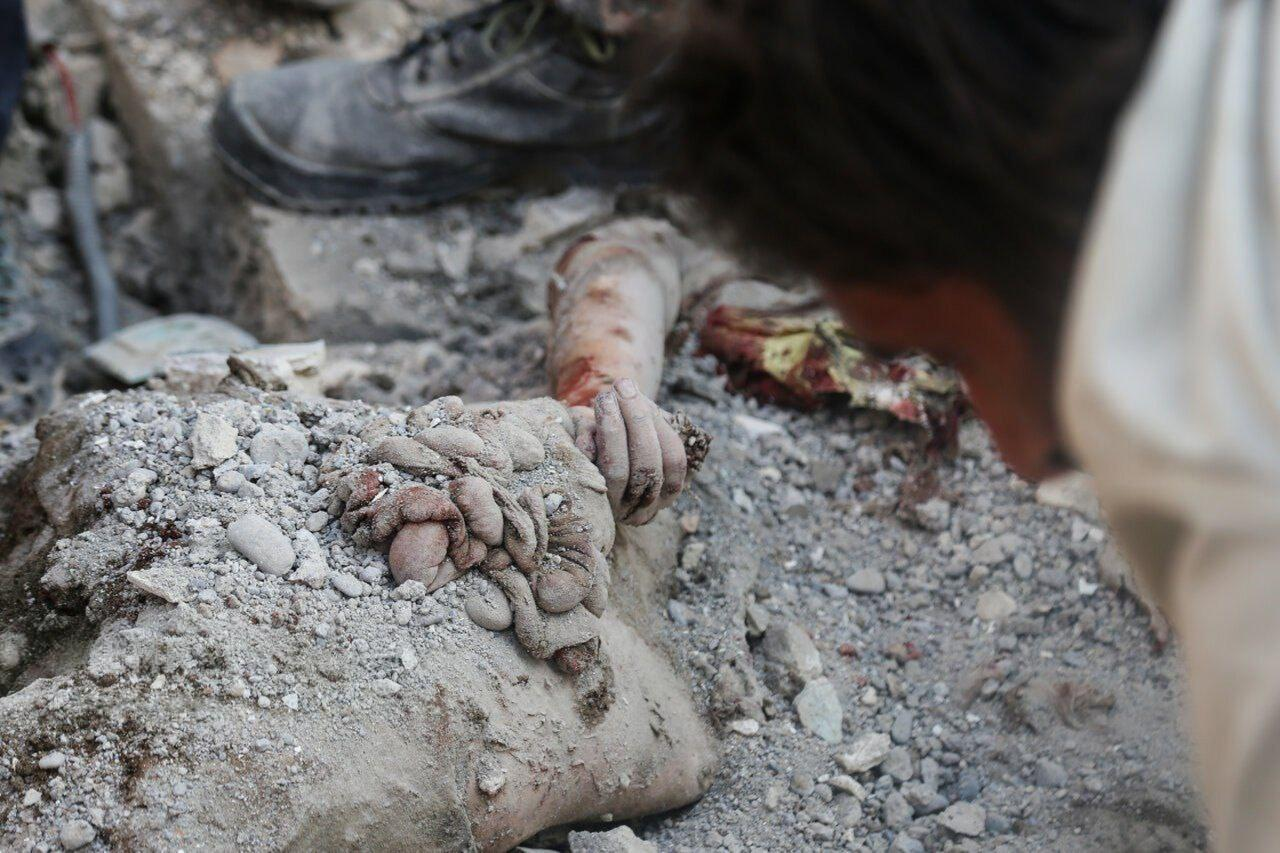
The body of a girl is trapped under the rubble, adjacent to disemboweled, dust-covered internal organs

156 people were killed in the strike; the victims included 120 students (73 boys and 47 girls), 26 teachers (all of whom were women), seven parents of students (four men and three women), a school bus driver and a pharmacy technician from a nearby clinic. Three more were presumed dead. Of the teachers killed, the school's principal was included. According to a local official, the fatalities included multiple parents who had come to pick up their children after the school's closure was ordered. This resulted in the death of three members of a four-member family. Fatalities rose from initial counts after the conclusion of recovery efforts on 1 March, (Note: According to multiple sources, including NBC News, ABC News, Middle East Eye, The Guardian, The New York Times, and Le Monde.) with reported numbers fluctuating as more bodies of those killed were identified.

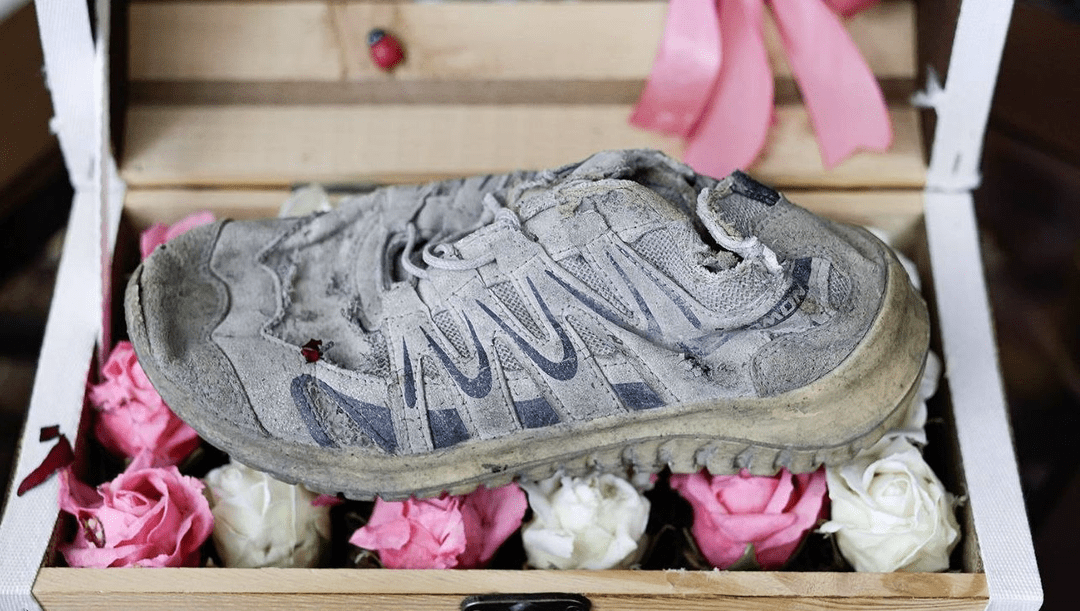
The first trace of Nasiri found during recovery efforts was his sneaker

Of the three presumed to be dead, all were children. Despite neither their bodies nor any trace thereof having been found, they were determined to include Makan Nasiri, Masiha Salari, and Amirali Jedavi. Nasiri's remains included only a blood-stained sweater and pair of sneakers. On 22 September, during a visit to the school, the judiciary spokesperson of Hormozgan officially announced that no remains of the three students had been found. All became symbols of civilian suffering during the conflict in Iran.

==== Lamerd sports hall attack ====
On 28 February 2026, a sports hall in Lamerd in southern Iran was struck by the United States Armed Forces with a two‑missile strike while a women's volleyball team was using the facility, killing at least 21 people, including 4 children, and injuring 100 people. The attack took place shortly after the 2026 Minab school attack. While the United States Central Command (CENTCOM) denied responsibility and accused Iran, investigations by The New York Times, BBC Verify, and independent analysts concluded that a United States Precision Strike Missile was used in the attack.

==== Karaj B1 bridge attack ====
As part of the 2026 Iran war, the unfinished B1 bridge in Karaj, Iran, was attacked on 2 April 2026 by the United States with two missiles, causing it to partially collapse. Eight people were killed and at least 95 were wounded. According to Iran's Fars News Agency, the second strike occurred once first responders had arrived to assist victims of the first strike. The deputy governor of Alborz province said the victims were civilians celebrating Sizdah Be-dar in the area below the bridge. The attack came amid United States president Donald Trump's threats to destroy Iranian civilian infrastructure.

== Iraq ==
Total casualties in Iraq included more than 146 killed and 525 injured.

More than 101 members of the pro-Iranian Popular Mobilization Forces (PMF), including 30 fighters of the Islamic Resistance in Iraq (IRI), had been killed in US and Israeli airstrikes. By 10 April 2026, 270 PMF members were also injured, although the number of injured IRI fighters was updated to 320 by the end of June. Another 32 PMF members were injured in a new round of US strikes in July. The IRI is composed of PMF members who have engaged in direct attacks on US military forces in Iraq. US airstrikes on PMF positions also killed seven Iraqi soldiers and two policemen, while 19 soldiers were injured.

In addition, in Iraq's northern Kurdish region, 32 people were killed and around 154 injured from attacks by both Iran and pro-Iranian Iraqi groups. The dead included 27 Peshmerga soldiers (belonging to either the KRG or the militias of the CPFIK), two civilians, one Asayish security forces member, one French soldier and one unknown individual. The injured also included six or seven French soldiers.

Three more civilians were killed in a rocket attack in southern Iraq that reportedly originated from Kuwait. Elsewhere, an Iraqi policeman was killed in a drone strike in Baghdad on the headquarters of the Iraqi National Intelligence Service.

== Israel ==
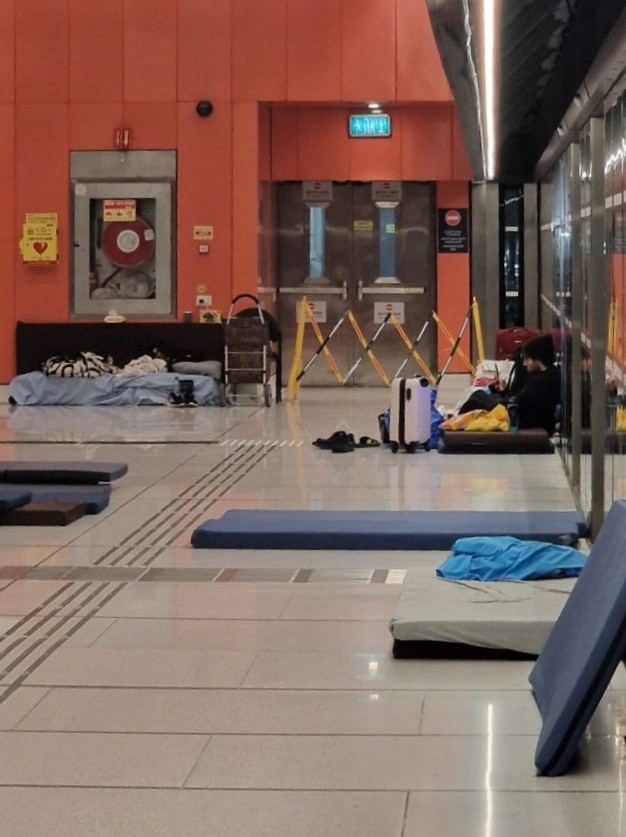
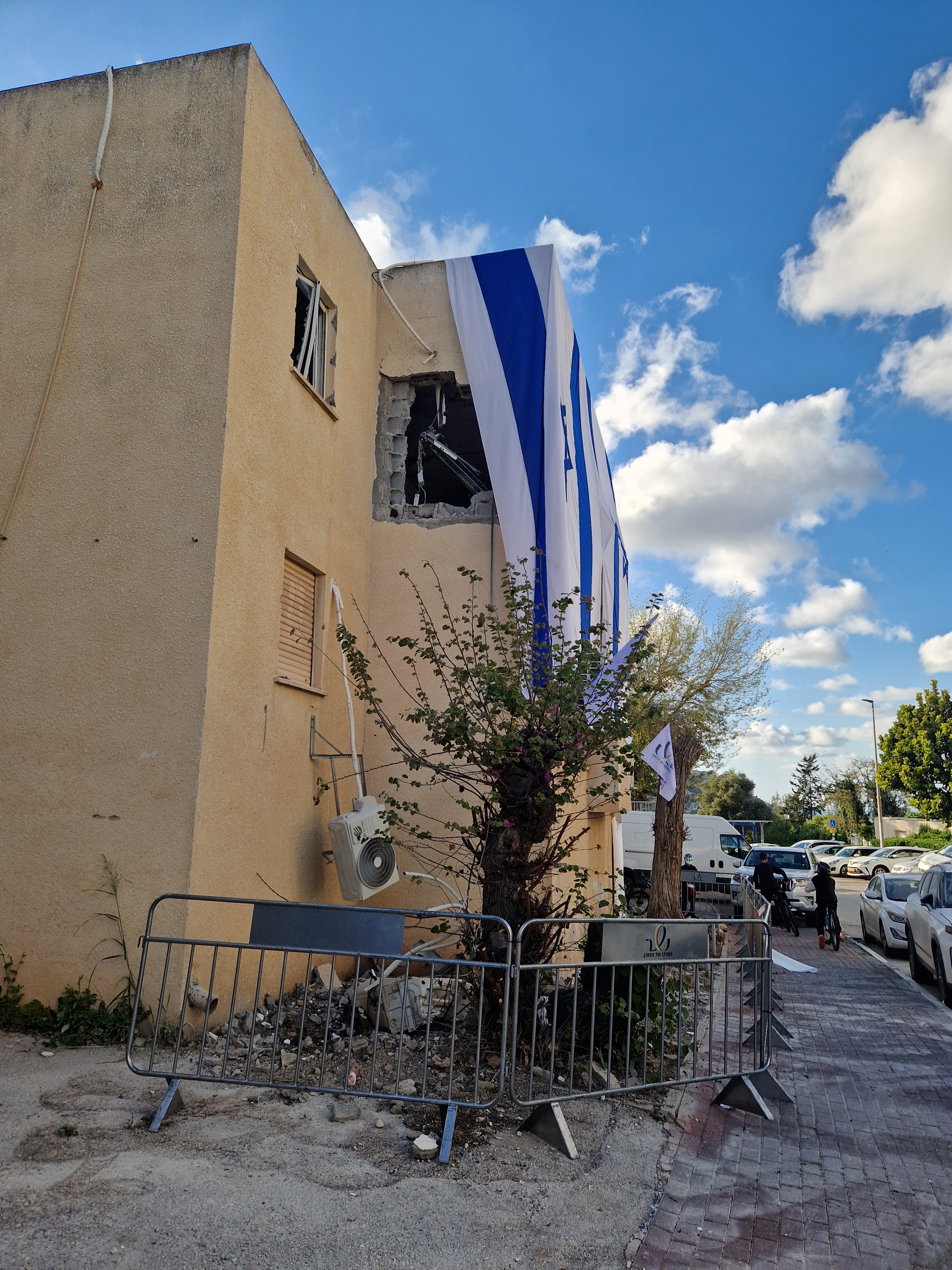
Left: Civilians sheltering in a converted light rail station in Tel Aviv on 6 March
Right: Homes in Nesher damaged by shrapnel from Iranian cluster munitions on 24 March

As of 5 August, 41 soldiers had been killed since the start of the conflict in northern Israel or southern Lebanon, including one soldier killed by friendly fire. One civilian IDF contractor was also killed while performing demolitions in Lebanon.

Civil defense siren and missile explosions sound in central Israel on 5 March

As of 5 August, 26 civilians died in Israel due to Iranian missile strikes and five were killed in Hezbollah strikes on northern Israel. This brought the total number of deaths among Israeli citizens or residents to 72. In addition, 7,841 people had been injured since the start of the war, including 1,468 soldiers.

On 28 February, the first connected Iranian attack struck a residential building in Israel, leaving one Israeli civilian injured. Magen David Adom reported that Iran's initial attacks had left 89 injured, with three directly wounded and the rest indirectly, most of them civilians, while a direct hit in Tel Aviv killed a civilian woman and injured 22 others, one seriously. On 1 March, an Iranian strike hit a synagogue and residential buildings in Beit Shemesh, killing nine people and injuring 49 others. On 9 March, two workers were killed while working outdoors at a construction site in Yehud, outside of Tel Aviv, after they were struck by submunitions from an Iranian missile equipped with a cluster bomb warhead.

On 17 March, a cluster munition from the warhead of an Iranian missile hit an apartment building in Ramat Gan and killed two residents in their 70s, who were found just outside their safe room. A statement from the Islamic Revolutionary Guard Corps called the barrage that killed the two civilians "revenge for the blood of martyr Dr. Ali Larijani and his companions", who had been killed the day before the Iranian attack. According to CNN, the use of cluster munitions violates international law. N.R. Jenzen-Jones of Armament Research Services stated that this type of warhead was being used "primarily to sow terror amongst a civilian population". The executive director of the Arms Control Association described the Iranian targeting of cluster munition warheads at residential sections of Israel as deliberate, saying that "Iran appears to be launching them into relatively populated areas, probably with the goal of producing potential civilian harm." Neither Iran nor Israel is party to the Convention on Cluster Munitions, and both are among 17 countries that either produce cluster munitions or reserve the right to do so.

== Lebanon ==
As of 20 June, at least 4,057 people have been killed and 12,121 wounded by Israeli strikes in Lebanon during the 2026 Lebanon war. Internal Hezbollah sources said that over 1,000 Hezbollah fighters had been killed in the war while the Israel Defense Forces (IDF) said that it had killed 1,700 fighters.

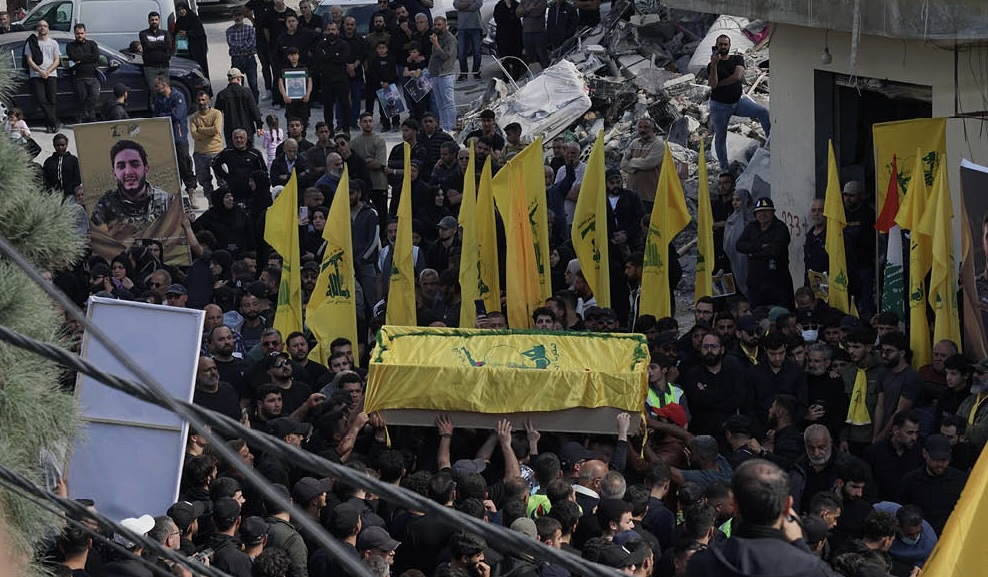
Funerary procession in Tyre for a deceased Hezbollah fighter, 21 April 2026

On 2 March, the first day of the war, Lebanon's Health Ministry reported that at least 31 people had been killed and 149 injured in the initial Israeli strikes, including 20 killed and 91 wounded in Beirut's southern suburbs and 11 killed and 58 wounded in southern Lebanon. Civilian displacement became significant, with families fleeing southern areas toward cities like Sidon. In the afternoon, the IDF announced that Hussein Makled, head of Hezbollah's intelligence headquarters, had been killed in overnight strikes in Beirut. Local media also reported the death of the brother of the late Mohammad Hussein Fadlallah along with his wife as a result of strikes in Haret Hreik. Palestinian Islamic Jihad in Lebanon announced that its commander, Adham Adnan al-Othman, had been killed in Beirut's southern suburbs. At night, casualties rose to 52 deaths and 154 injuries, according to the Health Ministry.

On 8 April, shortly after the United States and Iran agreed to a two-week ceasefire and Hezbollah signaled that it would pause its attacks on Israel accordingly, Israel launched what it described as its "most powerful attacks" on Lebanon, killing at least 357 people. The casualty count was among the highest of the war.

The percentage of women and children among those killed, overall lower than in the Gaza War, changed over time. During the first twenty days of the war, 1 out of 9 people killed by Israeli actions in Lebanon was a child. The percentage of children among those killed decreased during the later stages of the war.

== United States ==
As of 21 July, 23 service members and 1 civilian contractor had been killed, while at least 865 service members and 5 civilian contractors had been injured.

On 1 March, six US soldiers were killed and more than 30 were injured in an Iranian drone attack against a US military installation near Camp Arifjan in Port Shuaiba, Kuwait. All of those killed were assigned to the 103rd Expeditionary Sustainment Command. On 8 March, CENTCOM reported that a National Guard soldier had died from a "health-related incident in Kuwait on March 6 during a medical emergency". Sgt. Benjamin N. Pennington, a soldier of the 1st Space Brigade wounded in an attack against Prince Sultan Air Base in Saudi Arabia on 1 March, died from his injuries on 9 March.

Six American military airmen were killed on 12 March when their KC-135 aerial refueling aircraft crashed in western Iraq while supporting US military operations. CENTCOM said that the crash was not the result of hostile action and that it had resulted from an incident involving another US aircraft inside "friendly airspace". By 13 March, the US military had publicly announced that about 140 American servicemen had been injured. 1 civilian contractor from Kenya was killed during a night strike against a military base in Erbil on 24 March, with 5 others having been wounded. A 27 March attack on Prince Sultan Air Base damaged "multiple" refueling aircraft and destroyed a Boeing E-3 Sentry as well as wounding at least 15 US soldiers.

The USS Gerald R. Ford, the largest aircraft carrier in the theatre, was damaged by a fire that broke out 12 March. The US Navy said that the fire, which injured multiple sailors, (Note: The US Navy initially said that two sailors had been treated for non-life-threatening injuries before acknowledging that a third had been medically evacuated for further treatment. Several media outlets reported that as many as 200 sailors were also treated for symptoms of smoke inhalation.) had started in a laundry area and was not combat-related. The carrier had already been dealing with other mechanical issues, including a malfunctioning sewage treatment system, since before it arrived in the Middle East. According to multiple reports on 17–18 March, Gerald R. Ford paused launching airstrikes and sailed toward the Crete Naval Base for repairs. Many US service members had been relocated to "hotels and office spaces", raising concerns that the US has used civilians as human shields. Indeed, an Iranian attack on a hotel in Bahrain injured two employees of the Pentagon.

On 1 July 2026, a US Navy MH-60S Sea Hawk helicopter assigned to the USS George H. W. Bush crashed in the Arabian Sea. Three crew members were rescued in stable condition but one went missing. The US military launched a search to locate the missing sailor but concluded their extensive search on 5 July 2026 without finding the body and declared him dead.

Following the start of renewed fighting, on 17 July 2026, three American soldiers were killed during an Iranian missile attack on a target located inside Jordan. On 19 July, it was reported that one US soldier was killed during a "controlled detonation" of an Iranian drone in Northern Iraq. In late July, these four killed servicemembers were removed from the US government's database on casualties of the Iran war, and moved to a separate category, raising questions regarding accurate assessment of the impact of the war on US service members. According to the Pentagon press secretary, this happened due to “anomalies” and “temporary data disruptions” in the database that were “imminently” being resolved.

Amid concerns about changes in the Pentagon's casualty reporting, NBC News reported that on September 14, eight U.S. Marines were injured when an Iranian anti-ship cruise missile struck a maritime vessel they were operating on in the Strait of Hormuz, according to three U.S. officials. The Marines, part of a battalion landing team, included seven enlisted members and one officer. They experienced smoke inhalation and concussion-like symptoms, including headaches, and possible traumatic brain injuries; however, none were seriously injured, and all returned to duty shortly after the incident. The officials said that the vessel was not a U.S. Navy ship but did not provide further details about its type. The eight Marines were added to the Pentagon's Defense Casualty Analysis System (DCAS) nearly ten days after the attack. A U.S. official explained that the delay was due to symptoms that might not appear immediately and the system's lack of real-time updates.

While the Pentagon officially acknowledges 18 U.S. military fatalities in the Iran conflict, The Washington Post cited six officials reporting a death toll of at least 22. (Note: One of the six reported 23 dead.) The Pentagon has not publicly addressed the discrepancy, though Secretary of Defense Pete Hegseth denounced the report as “DISGUSTING and FAKE,” and described the Post as “worse than Iranian state media.” In late October, the Pentagon officially acknowledged 23 U.S. military fatalities.

== Palestine ==
On 18 March 2026, during a broader exchange of missile attacks in the 2026 Iran war, a missile struck a location next to a beauty salon in the town of Beit Awwa in the West Bank, near Hebron. The strike killed four Palestinian women and injured more than a dozen others. The incident was the first time a missile struck a territory controlled by the Palestinian Authority during the war.

Whilst the Palestinian Authority have stated it was "likely" an errant Israeli interceptor, multiple international media outlets have confirmed that the missile originated from Iran.

== United Arab Emirates ==
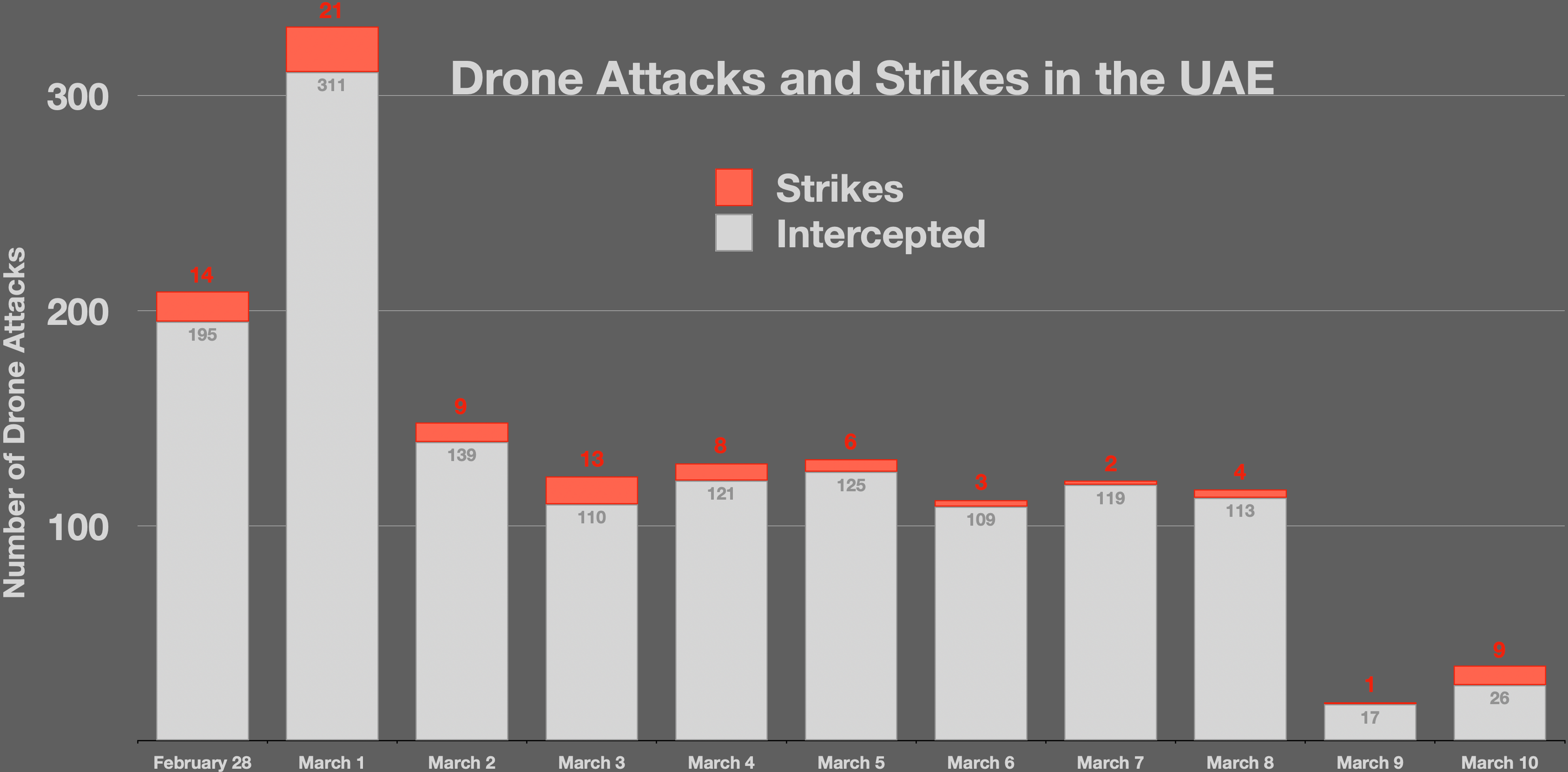
Drone attacks and strikes in the United Arab Emirates from 28 February to 10 March

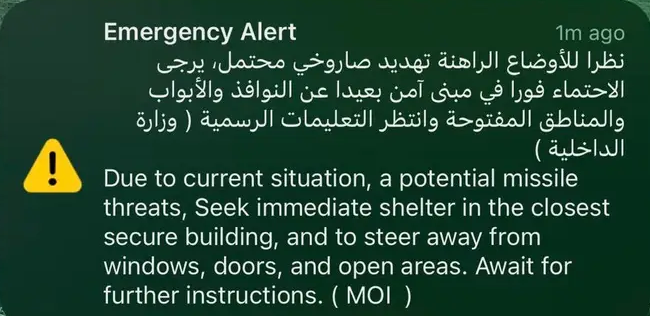
An emergency alert sent to residents of the United Arab Emirates shortly before Dubai International Airport was struck at around 12:30 a.m. local time on 1 March

In Iranian strikes against the United Arab Emirates, 15 people were killed, including two Emirati military personnel, one Moroccan civilian contractor who was killed in Bahrain while working for the United Arab Emirates Armed Forces, and 12 other civilians who were foreign nationals from Pakistan, Bangladesh, Nepal, Palestine, India, and Egypt. 246 people from 31 nationalities were injured.

On 7 March, a Pakistani driver was killed. On 16 March, a Palestinian woman was killed in Al Bahyah in Abu Dhabi after a missile hit a civilian car. The following day, a Pakistani was killed in Baniyas due to debris from a ballistic missile. The two military personnel who were killed were aboard a helicopter that crashed during a malfunction on 9 March. A Bangladeshi national was killed by debris on 1 April.

=== Casualties in the United Arab Emirates by nationality ===
Nationality	Killed	Ref.
Pakistan	4	
India	3	
Bangladesh	2	
United Arab Emirates	2	
Egypt	1	
Morocco	1	
Nepal	1	
Palestine	1	
Total	15	

== Kuwait ==
In Iranian strikes against Kuwait, 4 soldiers and 8 civilians were killed, while 82 soldiers and 108 civilians were injured.

== Oman ==
Fourteen people were killed and 35 were injured in strikes on Oman, including on ships within its territorial waters in the Strait of Hormuz.

=== Casualties in Oman and the Strait of Hormuz by nationality ===
Nationality	Killed	Ref.
India	6	
Indonesia	4	
Thailand	3	
Philippines	1	
14		

== Other countries and regions ==
In addition to its strikes against Israel, Iran launched strikes against multiple Gulf states. Three people were killed and 51 were injured in strikes against Bahrain. Three people were killed and 29 were injured in strikes against Saudi Arabia. One person was killed and 21 were injured in strikes against Qatar.

== Total services personnel lost ==
The following is a list of service members from the U.S. and U.S.-allied countries and members of peacekeeping forces confirmed killed during the 2026 Iran war. It includes services fatalities of nationalities whose stances in the war are variously described as 'Western Coalition', 'NATO', and 'Gulf Cooperation Council', as well as the 'International' category of United Nations peacekeeping forces.

Country	Number
Israel	40
United States	20
Indonesia	4 (UNIFIL)
France	3 (2 with UNIFIL)
Kuwait	4
United Arab Emirates	2
Serbia	1 (UNIFIL)
Total lost	74

== See also ==
- List of attacks during the 2026 Iran war
- List of aviation shootdowns and accidents during the 2026 Iran war
- List of ships attacked during the 2026 Iran war
- Casualties of the Twelve-Day War
- 2026 Iran massacres
- Iran–United States relations
- Iran–Israel relations
