= Makan Nasiri =

Iranian child, victim of 2026 U.S. missile attacks on Minab

- ماکان نصیری
- Photograph of Makan in his classroom, with the Iranian flag painted on his hand
- Born: c. 2019
- Died: 28 February 2026 (aged 7); Shajareh Tayyebeh Elementary School, Minab, Hormozgan province, Iran
- Known for: Victim of the 2026 Minab school attack; remains never recovered

Makan Nasiri (Persian: ماکان نصیری; c. 2019 – 28 February 2026) was a seven‑year‑old Iranian boy who was killed in a U.S. missile strike on the Shajareh Tayyebeh elementary school in Minab, Hormozgan province, Iran, on the first day of the 2026 Iran war. He is one of three children whose remains were never recovered, despite a 140‑day search of the rubble. An empty grave was created in his honor, and his belongings—a blood‑stained blue sweater and a single cream‑colored sneaker—are preserved in a glass case at a neighborhood mosque. According to Hormozgan Chief Justice, Qahramani, experts believe a direct missile strike on Makan left no recoverable remains, with only his shoe and torn backpack subsequently found.

== Personal life ==
Makan was a first grader at Shajareh Tayyebeh elementary school. He was the youngest of the four children in his family. According to his father, Sirus Nasiri, Makan loved sports. The day of the attack was Makan's seventh birthday, and he wore a blue sweater against the morning cold. He took gymnastics classes. He would also help at the local religious center with his family. According to his mother, Asieh Rahinejad, there was a birthmark similar to a mole on Makan's body, that would become more colored in winter. His uncle, Hamzeh Rahinejad, later searched for this birthmark as a means of identification.

== Background ==
On 28 February 2026, the first day of the 2026 Iran war, a series of airstrikes were carried out by the United States and Israel against several targets in Iran. A U.S. Navy Tomahawk cruise missile struck the Shajareh Tayyebeh elementary school in Minab while classes were in session. A second missile struck minutes later. According to the Iranian government, 156 people were killed, including 120 students (73 boys and 47 girls), 26 female teachers (including one who was six months pregnant), seven parents, a school bus driver, and a technician. Iranian officials have characterized the attack as the deadliest civilian incident of the entire war. According to the Tehran Times, the incident is known as "the most heinous massacre of innocent children in the world", which left at least 168 children dead.

As of 23 April 2026, the Legal Medicine Organisation of Iran recorded 3,375 deaths since the start of the war, among them 383 victims under the age of 19. The toll includes seven infants, 255 children aged one to 12, and 121 adolescents aged 13 to 18. The identities of four victims had yet to be established.

== Disappearance and search ==
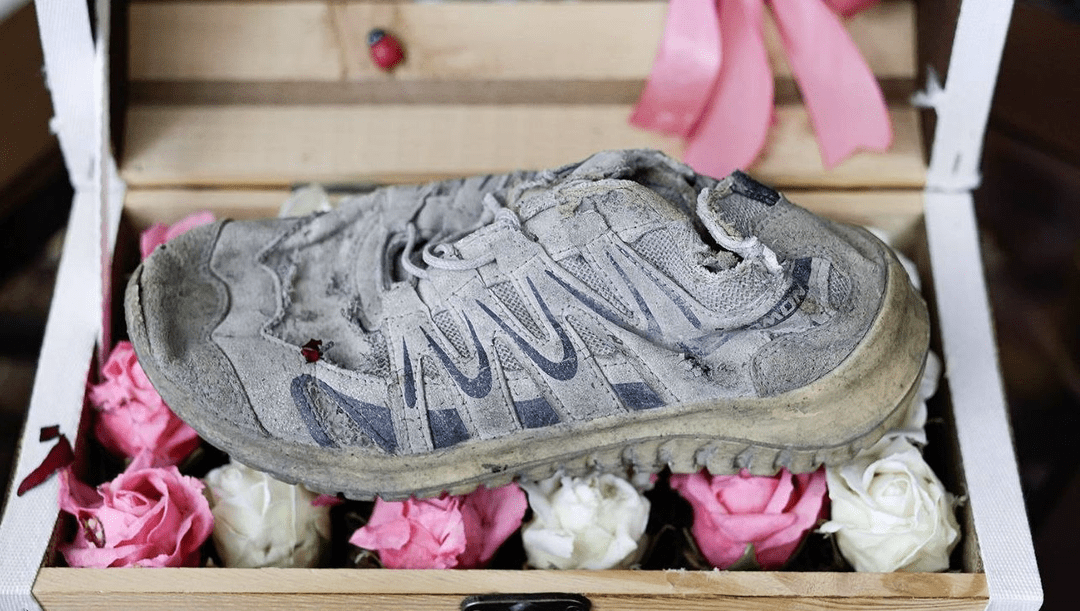
A single sneaker belonging to Makan Nasiri, found in the rubble of the destroyed school

At approximately 11:16 a.m. on the day of the attack, Makan's mother received a phone call from his teacher, Mandana Salari, instructing her to pick up Makan immediately because the school was under attack. Unaware that war had begun, she contacted the school bus driver. While still on the phone, she heard a massive explosion. Makan's parents rushed to the school, arriving to find the buildings reduced to rubble. Makan's father searched the rubble from the afternoon of 28 February until 2:30 a.m. the next day, finding nothing. A 20‑member team of relatives, led by Makan's uncle Hamzeh Rahinejad, continued the search for 46 days. Hamzeh had a gauze bandage along with a plastic bag to collect any piece of flesh or bone, searching for the family's birthmark, but found no trace of Makan.

On the 38th day, Hamzeh discovered a single cream‑colored sneaker about 100 metres (330 ft) from the destroyed school, among trees in a nearby garden. A wrinkled, blood‑stained blue sweater was also recovered. When the sneaker was shown to Asieh Rahinejad, she fainted. No other remains or personal effects of Makan have ever been found. After 46 days, Iranian authorities informed the family that the search had been closed. Makan is one of the children who are still missing among the 156 people killed on 28 February, though the remains of some victims were identified and returned to their families through DNA testing. A symbolic empty grave was created for Makan in Minab's martyrs' cemetery, alongside the graves of other victims. His remaining belongings are displayed in a small glass box at the Mahdieh mosque in the neighborhood of his family.

Qahramani, the Chief Justice of Hormozgan Province stated that, due to the high destructive power of the missiles used, and despite multiple specialized search operations at the school and its environs, no remains of the child had been found even after more than 100 days and the collection of over 100 DNA samples. According to him, the most recent search efforts—which involved looking for hair and other remains—yielded no trace of Makan, and DNA tests conducted on the samples returned negative for him. He added that experts believe a missile struck his body directly, leaving no physical remains; only one shoe and his torn backpack were recovered.

On 21 July 2026, 140 days after the attack, Mohammad Radmehr, the governor of Minab, stated that DNA tests have identified 62 more body fragments belonging to 32 victims, but none of them have been identified as belonging to Makan. He was one of three children whose remains were never found, the other two being students Masiha Salari and Amirali Jedavi, according to a statement by a Judiciary spokesperson on 22 September 2026.

== Legacy ==
Makan Nasiri became a symbol of civilian suffering in the conflict. In May 2026, Iran named its delegation to the Youth Olympic Games after him. A street in Khomeinishahr, his father's birthplace, is planned to be named in his memory. Iranian director Siyamak Mardane announced that he had written a screenplay about Makan's life and disappearance. The first fine arts vocational school in the city of Minab, named after "Shahid Makan Nasiri," was launched with the aim of providing specialized education and nurturing future artists in Hormozgan.

An international "1+168" campaign was launched under the slogan "I Am the Voice of Minab," involving the families and media activists from multiple countries. Makan's mother later told reporters: "It is an honor for me to be the mother of Makan." In April 2026, speaking on behalf of the parents of the Minab school victims, she told a memorial ceremony in Isfahan: "We want them to take revenge for our children's massacre."

== See also ==
- 2026 Minab school attack
- Casualties of the 2026 Iran war
- List of attacks related to primary schools
