= Map regression =

map regression - transcription

Map regression is the process of working backwards from later maps to earlier maps of the same area, to determine change or to locate past features.

== Historical map regression ==
The process is mainly used in research on the history of places, sometimes termed historic map regression. Comparing maps of an area compiled in different periods can help reconstruct the chronology of events which have altered the natural or built environment. In archaeology, map regression can help to locate features appearing only on earlier maps and to assign building phases. It is often part of desk based assessments before field work is undertaken.

== Methods ==
Map regression is performed either by comparing individual features between maps, or by re-projecting an entire map so as to fit another onto which it can then be superimposed. The process can include resolving any differences in map scale, projection, datum, or format; and the interpretation of each map in its meaning and accuracy.

=== Transcription ===
Similarities between maps, such as topography or built structures, are identified to determine where distinct features from one map are plotted on another. One manual technique is to copy features from earlier maps onto transparent overlays placed on the most recent map which provides the spatial framework. By working in sequence back in time a chronology is compiled. This intensive process can promote a more considered assessment as every feature is treated individually.

=== Transformation ===
Computer based geographical information systems facilitate the scaling, rotation, and translation of an entire map to fit over another. Georeferencing establishes a congruent relationship between maps, and allows each map to be transformed and automatically re-projected as an overlay. This method is useful for the regression of maps that differ in format, for example, raster images of early maps and vector representations of modern maps.

== Limitations ==
Features not appearing on one map but shown on another do not necessarily indicate an actual difference, due to purpose, detail, or accuracy; for example, comparing cadastral and topographic maps.

Map format can reduce confidence in a regression. 'Strip' maps, or traverse surveys, which record features in a linear path can complicate the spatial interpolation required to match a planar format.

Historical research can involve early maps of uncertain accuracy or datum. They are often small scale which leads to the magnification of any position errors in enlarging to match large scale maps. Georeferencing is not always straightforward; topography such as river courses and coastlines change over time, as do road routes and other built structures.

== See also ==
- Archaeology
- Cartography
- Collaborative mapping
