= Armament Research Services =

Australian consultancy company

Armament Research Services (ARES) is a consultancy company providing expertise and analyses in the field of arms and munitions to governments and non-government organizations. As of January 2014 director of Armament Research Services is N.R. Jenzen-Jones.

Founded in 2013 and operating from Australia they have provided analysis services to, e.g., the International Committee of the Red Cross.
