= List of attacks during the 2026 Iran war =

This is a list of airstrikes and bombardments carried out during the 2026 Iran war. The strikes began on 28 February 2026, when Israel and the United States launched attacks on targets across Iran, codenamed Operation Roaring Lion (Note: Hebrew: מִבְצַע שְׁאָגַת הָאֲרִי, romanized: Mivtsá She'agát Ha'arí) in Israel and Operation Epic Fury in the United States.

During the conflict, Iran reportedly carried out attacks or hostile actions against multiple countries and targets across the region, including Israel, Bahrain, Kuwait, Oman—where specific incidents involved ports and ships—Qatar, the United Arab Emirates, Jordan, Saudi Arabia, Syria, Iraq, Turkey, the British overseas territory of Akrotiri and Dhekelia, and the West Bank. Additional alleged activity was reported in Azerbaijan, while maritime targets included vessels of the United States Navy and Thai-flagged ships operating in the region.

== Operations Roaring Lion and Epic Fury ==
=== Tehran ===
Airstrike target	Date	Fatalities	Injuries	Casualties and damage
Pasteur district	28 February 2026	Unknown (Note: Ali Khamenei may have been amongst these fatalities.)	Unknown	Targets in the Pasteur district of Tehran included Iranian Supreme Leader Ali Khamenei's residence, the Sa'dabad Complex (the residence of the President), and the National Security Council. Early reports suggested that at least seven missiles struck the area.
Office of the Supreme Leader Ali Khamenei	28 February 2026	Unknown (Note: Ali Khamenei may have been amongst these fatalities.)	Unknown	
Presidential office of Masoud Pezeshkian	28 February 2026	Unknown	Unknown	
University Street	28 February 2026	Unknown	Unknown	
Jomhouri area	28 February 2026	Unknown	Unknown	
Northern Seyed Khandan area	28 February 2026	Unknown	Unknown	
Azadi Stadium	1 March 2026	Unknown	Unknown	
Azadi Square	1 March 2026	Unknown	Unknown	
Milad Tower	1 March 2026	Unknown	Unknown	
Peace Building, Iranian Red Crescent Society	1 March 2026	Unknown	Unknown	The Iranian Red Crescent Society reported explosions near hospitals in Tehran, as well as near its Peace Building.
Thar-Allah Headquarters	1 March 2026	Unknown	Unknown	The IDF declared it had levelled the "General Staff of the internal security forces", and the Thar-Allah Headquarters.
State radio and television headquarters	1 March 2026	Unknown	Unknown	
District 18 municipality building	5 March 2026	Unknown	Unknown	
Underground missile site in Tehran	5 March 2026	Unknown	Unknown	
Mahallati town, (northeastern Tehran Province)	5 March 2026	Unknown	Unknown	
Near Azadi Stadium	5 March 2026	Unknown	Unknown	Massive explosions seen near the Azadi Stadium.
The compound of Ayatollah Khamenei	6 March 2026	Unknown	Unknown	Targeted airstrikes hit the compound of the now dead Supreme Leader Ayatollah Khamenei.
Police Park	Unknown	Unknown	Unknown	
Rafi-Nia Synagogue	7 March 2026	Unknown	Unknown	First Iranian synagogue destroyed by the United States and Israel since the Iranian Revolution.
The camp of the national wrestling teams of Iran	March/April 2026	Unknown	Unknown	
Shooting Federation (of Iran)	March/April 2026	Unknown	Unknown	Damage to various parts of the Shooting Federation of Islamic Republic of Iran
Bodybuilding and Fitness Federation Building (of Iran)	March 2026	Unknown	Unknown	
Tennis Federation of Iran	8 March 2026	Unknown	Unknown	The Tennis Federation of Iran building suffered serious damage.
Rowing Federation of Iran	March 2026	Unknown	Unknown	Following the missile attacks, the Rowing Federation of Iran building suffered serious damage.

=== Other locations ===
Airstrike target	Date	Fatalities	Injuries	Casualties and Damage information
Shajareh Tayyebeh school, Minab	28 February 2026	148–168	Unknown	The school is destroyed. Casualties were mostly schoolgirls. Note: The school was located close to (Note: Variously described as "about 600m [660 yd] from the base", "within less than 100 yards [91 m] of the perimeter of [the base]", and "adjacent to [the base].") the Sayyid al-Shuhada military complex which included the headquarters of the Asif Brigade of the Islamic Revolutionary Guard Corps (IRGC) Navy.
Qom	28 February 2026	Unknown	Unknown	
Lamerd	28 February 2026	21	100	At least 21 people, including children and teenage girls at a volleyball practice, were killed in the 2026 Lamerd sports hall attack.
Kermanshah	28 February 2026	Unknown	Unknown	See air campaign in Iranian Kurdistan
Isfahan	28 February 2026	Unknown	Unknown	
Karaj	28 February 2026	Unknown	Unknown	
Urmia	5 March 2026	Unknown	Unknown	See air campaign in Iranian Kurdistan
Bandar Abbas	5 March 2026	Unknown	Unknown	The port was set ablaze by U.S.-Israeli airstrikes
Eyvan	5 March 2026	Unknown	Unknown	A police station in Eyvan located in the Ilam province was destroyed.
Sanandaj	5 March 2026	Unknown	Unknown	See air campaign in Iranian Kurdistan
Bushehr	5 March 2026	Unknown	Unknown	Ammo depot in Bushehr blown up by U.S.-Israeli airstrikes
Tabriz	5 March 2026	Unknown	Unknown	The Ashura Brigade HQ in Tabriz was destroyed.
Isfahan	5 March 2026	Unknown	Unknown	
Tehran, Be'sat stadium	5 March 2026	Unknown	Unknown	Following US and Israeli attacks, Be'sat (Mothers) Stadium in Tehran was completely destroyed.
Kharg Island	13 March 2026	Unknown	Unknown	See 2026 Kharg Island raid
South Pars gas field	18 March 2026	Unknown	Unknown	See 2026 South Pars field attack
Kuhestak (Sirik)	1 September 2026	Unknown	Unknown	During the United States Armed Forces strike against a wedding in the Kuhestak area of Bandar Sirik, Iran, five people were killed, and more than 50 were injured.

=== Strikes against Iranian-backed paramilitary groups ===
==== Popular Mobilization Forces (PMU) ====
Airstrike target	Date	Fatalities	Injuries	Casualties and Damage information
Jurf al-Sakhar	28 February 2026	At least two, these being reported as PMU members	At least three, these being reported as PMU members	A spokesperson for the Iraqi Popular Mobilization Forces said that two of its fighters had been killed while three more had been injured during strikes in Jurf al-Sakhar, south of Baghdad.

==== Hezbollah ====
Airstrike target	Date	Fatalities	Injuries	Casualties and Damage information
Beirut	2 March 2026	0	0	
Beqaa Valley	2 March 2026	0	0	
Southern Lebanon	2 March 2026	0	0	
Nabatieh	2 March ~ 3 March 2026	Unknown	Unknown	The Hezbollah command center in the Nabatieh was destroyed by Israeli airstrikes.
Mefdoun	5 March 2026	Unknown	Unknown	
Zibqin	5 March 2026	Unknown	Unknown	
Roumine & Ghandouriyeh	5 March 2026	Unknown	Unknown	Israel struck both neighbouring locations at the same time.
Multiple targets around Qalila (Tyre district)	5 March 2026	Unknown	Unknown	
Al-Housh (Tyre district)	5 March 2026	Unknown	Unknown	A drone strike near Al-Housh Tyre district.
Dahieh neighbourhood (Beirut)	5 March 2026	Unknown	Unknown	
Aita al-Shaab	6 March 2026	Unknown	Unknown	
Al-Nabi Shayth	6 March 2026	9	17	
Raouché, Beirut	8 March 2026	4	10	Drone strike on a hotel room targeting IRGC operatives in Beirut.

== Killings of Iranian officials ==
Portrait	Name	Position	Date of death	Notes
	Ali Khamenei	Supreme Leader of Iran	28 February 2026	Killed in an airstrike on his compound in Tehran
	Rear Admiral; Ali Shamkhani	Secretary of the Iranian Defence Council	28 February 2026	Killed at the Iranian Defence Council meeting
	Major General; Mohammad Pakpour	Commander-in-Chief of the Islamic Revolutionary Guard Corps	28 February 2026	Killed at the Iranian Defence Council meeting
	Major General; Abdolrahim Mousavi	Chief of the General Staff of the Iranian Armed Forces	28 February 2026	Killed at the Iranian Defence Council meeting
	Brigadier General; Aziz Nasirzadeh	Minister of Defence	28 February 2026	Killed at the Iranian Defence Council meeting
	Brigadier General; Hossein Jabal Amelian	Head of the Organization of Defensive Innovation and Research (SPND), Deputy Minister of Defence	28 February 2026	Killed at the Iranian Defence Council meeting
	Brigadier General; Reza Mozaffari Nia	Former Head of the Organization of Defensive Innovation and Research (SPND), Deputy Minister of Defence	28 February 2026	Killed at the Iranian Defence Council meeting
	Mohammad Baseri	Senior Intelligence Ministry official	28 February 2026	Killed in US–Israeli strikes
	Yahya Hosseini Panjaki	Deputy Minister of Intelligence for Israel affairs, Head of Directorate for Internal Security of Ministry of Intelligence and Security (MOIS)	28 February 2026	Killed in Israeli strikes on leadership in Tehran
	Brigadier General; Saleh Asadi	Deputy for Intelligence of the Armed Forces General Staff and Head of Intelligence Directorate, Khatam al-Anbiya Central Headquarters	28 February 2026	Killed at the Iranian Defence Council meeting
	Brigadier General; Mohammad Shirazi	Head of the Military Office of the Supreme Leader	28 February 2026	Killed in an airstrike alongside Khamenei
	Brigadier General; Akbar Ebrahimzadeh	Deputy Head of the Military Office of the Supreme Leader	28 February 2026	Killed in an airstrike alongside Khamenei
	Brigadier General; Gholamreza Rezaian	Head of the Iranian Police Intelligence Organization	2 March 2026	Killed in US-Israeli strikes on command centers
	Brigadier General; Bahram Hosseini Motlagh	Head of Planning and Operations for the General Staff of the Armed Forces	2 March 2026	Killed in US-Israeli strikes on command centers
	Brigadier General; Hassan-Ali Tajik	Head of the Logistics Department of the Armed Forces General Staff	2 March 2026	Killed in US-Israeli strikes on command centers
	Brigadier General; Mohsen Darrebaghi	Deputy for Logistics and Support, General Staff of the Armed Forces of the Islamic Republic of Iran	2 March 2026	Killed in US-Israeli strikes on command centers
	Mohsen Mahdavi Kalateh	Deputy Minister of Intelligence	3 March 2026	Killed in airstrikes on leadership
	Ali Hashemi	Deputy Commander of the Islamic Revolutionary Guard Corps Saheb al-Zaman in Isfahan	8 March 2026	Killed in airstrikes on leadership
	Mohammadreza Saqafifar	Special Assistant to Supreme Leader Ali Khamenei	8 March 2026	Killed in airstrikes on leadership
	Asadollah Badfar	Head of the paramilitary Basij forces, General Staff of the Iranian Armed Forces	9 March 2026 (funeral)	Killed in airstrikes on leadership
	Esmail Dehghan	Senior Commander of the Islamic Revolutionary Guard Corps Aerospace Force	10 March 2026	Killed in airstrikes in Arak
	Akbar Ghaffari	Deputy Minister of Intelligence	12 March 2026	Killed in strikes on leadership in Tehran
	Naqi Mohaddesnia	Head of Clergy Affairs of the Islamic Revolutionary Guard Corps in East Azerbaijan	12 March 2026	Killed in Israeli attacks
	Brigadier General; Abolqasem Babaeian	Chief of Staff of the Khatam al-Anbiya Central Headquarters	14 March 2026	Killed in strikes in Tehran
	Brigadier General; Abdullah Jalali-Nasab	Senior officer of Khatam al-Anbiya Emergency Command's intelligence branch	14 March 2026	Killed in an Israeli attack on leadership
	Brigadier General; Ali Larijani	Secretary of the Supreme National Security Council	17 March 2026	Killed in Israeli strikes on leadership in Tehran
	Brigadier General; Gholamreza Soleimani	Head of the paramilitary Basij forces	17 March 2026	Killed in Israeli strikes on the Basij meeting in Tehran
	Brigadier General; Esmail Ahmadi	Head of Intelligence for the paramilitary Basij forces	17 March 2026	Killed in Israeli strikes on the Basij meeting in Tehran; deputy to Gholamreza Soleimani
	Alireza Bayat	Deputy for Internal Security of the Supreme National Security Council	17 March 2026	Killed in Israeli strikes on leadership in Tehran
	Morteza Larijani	Assistant for Internal Security of the Supreme National Security Council	17 March 2026	Killed in Israeli strikes on leadership in Tehran; son of Ali Larijani
	Ali Bateni	Deputy Secretary of the Supreme National Security Council	17 March 2026	Killed in Israeli strikes on leadership in Tehran
	Qassem Qoreishi	Deputy Head of the paramilitary Basij forces	17 March 2026	Killed in Israeli strikes on the Basij meeting in Tehran
	Azim Esmaili Khosrowabadi	Deputy Commander of the paramilitary Basij forces	17 March 2026	Killed in Israeli strikes on the Basij meeting in Tehran
	Esmaeil Khatib	Minister of Intelligence	18 March 2026	Killed in strikes on leadership
	Afshin Naghshbandi	Representative of General Staff of the Armed Forces to the paramilitary Basij forces	19 March 2026 (reported date)	Killed in airstrikes on leadership
	Second Brigadier General; Ali Mohammad Naini	Spokesperson of the Islamic Revolutionary Guard Corps and Deputy for Public Relations	20 March 2026	Killed in Israeli strikes on leadership
	Mehdi Qureishi	Commander of the Islamic Revolutionary Guard Corps Aerospace Force	20 March 2026	Killed in strikes on leadership in Isfahan
	Mehdi Rostami Shomastan	Senior Commander in the Ministry of Intelligence	20 March 2026	Killed in Israeli strikes on leadership
	Ghadir Azarian	Commander of the Islamic Revolutionary Guard Corps in East Azerbaijan	21 March 2026 (reported date)	Killed in airstrikes on leadership
	Ebrahim Mortazavi-Nasb	Commander of a paramilitary Basij unit in Shiraz	22 March 2026 (reported date)	Killed in US-Israeli strikes
	Commodore; Alireza Tangsiri	Commander of the Islamic Revolutionary Guard Corps Navy	26 March 2026	Killed in US-Israeli strikes in Bandar Abbas
	Behnam Rezaei	Head of the IRGC Navy Intelligence Directorate	26 March 2026	Killed in US-Israeli strikes
	Brigadier General; Jamshid Eshaghi	Chief of the Office of Budget and Financial Affairs within the Armed Forces General Staff	31 March 2026	Killed in US-Israeli strikes
	Mohammad Ali Fathalizadeh	Commander of the Fatehin unit	1 April 2026	Killed in US-Israeli strikes
	Brigadier General; Majid Khademi	Head of the Intelligence Organization and Intelligence Protection Organization of the Islamic Revolutionary Guard Corps	6 April 2026	Killed in Israeli strikes
	Brigadier General; Yazdan Mir	Commander of Unit 840 of the IRGC Quds Force	6 April 2026	Killed in Israeli strikes; a.k.a. Asghar Bagheri
	Kamal Kharazi	Minister of Foreign Affairs (1997–2005)	9 April 2026	Succumbed to wounds from US–Israeli strikes

== Iranian and allies response ==
Daily number of missiles and drones launched by Iran across the Middle East.

=== Israel ===
Airstrike target	Date	Fatalities	Injuries	Casualties and damage
Tel Aviv	28 February 2026	1	27	A strike on a residential area in Tel Aviv killed a woman and injured 27 others.
Haifa	28 February 2026	Unknown	Unknown	
Northern Israel	28 February 2026	0	1	A nine-storey building was hit by missiles injuring one person.
Beit Shemesh	1 March 2026	9	65	An Iranian missile breached Israeli defenses and hit a synagogue and homes in Beit Shemesh, killing 9 people and injuring 65.
West Jerusalem	1 March 2026	0	6	Towards the end of the day a ballistic missile hit an area of West Jerusalem causing property damages in the surrounding road, damaging a civilian vehicle and wounding six people.
Tel-Aviv	5 March 2026	0	0	
Northern Israel	5 March 2026	Unknown	Unknown	Around 10 rockets were launched from Lebanon into northern Israel. No injuries have been reported.
Haifa & Northern Israel	5 March 2026	0	0	At roughly 9 PM local time, missiles were launched at northern Israel from Lebanon and Iran.
Yehud	9 March 2026	2	2	An Iranian attack stuck a construction site killing two wounding two.
Northern Israel	13 March 2026	0	58	
Eilat	14 March 2026	0	2	
Old City of Jerusalem	16 March 2026	0	0	After Jerusalem was targeted by Iran, missile and interceptor fragments fell in and around the Old City, including near the religious sites of the Temple Mount, the Church of the Holy Sepulchre, the Jewish Quarter, and the Western Wall. No one was killed and injured.
Dimona	21 March 2026	0	60	Iranian missile attack on the Israeli town of Dimona.
Arad	21 March 2026	0	115	Iranian missile attack on the southern Israeli town of Arad.
Tel Aviv and central Israel	21 March 2026	0	15	Iranian missile attack with cluster munitions on Tel Aviv and central Israel.
Tel Aviv	28 March 2026	1	2	A strike on a building in Tel Aviv killed a man and wounded two. The building was the same targeted on 28 February.

=== Bahrain ===
Airstrike target	Date	Fatalities	Injuries	Casualties and damage
Manama	28 February 2026	Unknown	Unknown	Arabic media outlets reported explosions and smoke being seen in the capital
US Fifth Fleet headquarters	28 February 2026 and 1 March 2026	Unknown	Unknown	Fleet HQ building, security forces building, gallery, water tank, etc.
Crowne Plaza Hotel, Manama	1 March 2026	0	0	An Iranian drone hit the Crowne Plaza Hotel in Manama, Bahrain, causing a fire and the intervention of the Bahraini civil defence teams to safeguard the tourists and personnel located in the hotel.
Bahrain International Airport	1 March 2026	0	0	An Iranian drone struck Bahrain International Airport, causing minor damage.
Mina Salman Port	2 March 2026	0	0	An Iranian strike targeted Mina Salman port in Bahrain causing a fire.
All four Governorates of Bahrain	Unknown	Unknown	Unknown	
BAPCO refinery	Unknown	Unknown	Unknown	

=== Kuwait ===
Iranian attacks killed one person and injured 32 in Kuwait.

Airstrike target	Date	Fatalities	Injuries	Casualties and damage
Kuwait International Airport, Farwaniya Governorate, Kuwait City	28 February 2026	Unknown	Unknown	Explosions reported.
Ali Al Salem Air Base	28 February 2026	Unknown	Unknown	United States Air Force (USAF) located at the base, as well as Italian soldiers.
Port Shuaiba, Kuwait	1 March 2026	6	30	Iranian drone attacks on Port Shuaiba left 6 US servicemen killed and dozens wounded.
Embassy of the United States, Kuwait City	2 March 2026	Unknown	Unknown	The United States embassy in Kuwait was hit by an Iranian missile strike, prompting US Secretary of State Marco Rubio to close the embassy until further notice.

=== Oman ===
==== Ports ====
Airstrike target	Date	Fatalities	Injuries	Casualties and damage
Port of Duqm	1 March 2026	0	1	Port of Duqm reportedly hit by two drones, injuring one expatriate worker.

==== Ships ====
Airstrike target	Flag state	Type	Date	Fatalities	Injuries	Casualties and damage
Skylight	Palau	Oil/Chemical tanker	1 March 2026	0	4	Oman's Maritime Security Centre confirmed that the tanker Skylight was attacked 5 nautical miles north of Khasab, injuring four Indian and Iranian crew members.
Hercules Star	Gibraltar	Oil tanker	1 March 2026	Unknown	Unknown	A projectile struck a vessel 17 nautical miles northwest of Mina Saqr, UAE, sparking a fierce fire that crews successfully extinguished despite the surrounding chaos.
MKD Vyom	Marshall Islands	Oil tanker	1 March 2026	Unknown	Unknown	The bunkering tanker Hercules Star sustained a confirmed projectile strike off the UAE-Oman coast, forcing the vessel to retreat to a Dubai anchorage for safety.

=== Qatar ===
Airstrike target	Date	Fatalities	Injuries	Casualties and damage
Al Udeid Air Base	28 February 2026	Unknown	Unknown	Houses the Qatar Emiri Air Force, United States Air Force (USAF), United Kingdom Royal Air Force (RAF), Royal Australian Air Force (ADF), and other foreign forces. It is host to a forward headquarters of U.S. Central Command, headquarters of the USAF Central Command, No. 83 Expeditionary Air Group RAF, and the 379th Air Expeditionary Wing of the USAF.
Doha	5 March 2026	Unknown	Unknown	Missile shot down over Doha, casualties still unknown, damage from fragments is minimal.

=== UAE ===
Airstrike target	Date	Fatalities	Injuries	Casualties and damage
Abu Dhabi	28 February 2026	1	Unknown	The UAE stated that it had successfully intercepted a number of Iranian missiles and that one Asian national had been killed by interceptor debris which had fallen on a residential area.
Fairmont The Palm, Palm Jumeirah, Dubai	28 February 2026	0	4	The hotel was struck by an Iranian missile on 28 February 2026, causing a fire. According to Dubai's Media Office, four people were injured. Residential areas of Dubai in the proximity of the Burj Khalifa and Dubai Marina were hit.
Burj Al Arab	28 February 2026	Unknown	Unknown	"Fragments from the interceptions" had fallen and caused damage to the Burj Al Arab.
Al Dhafra Air Base	28 February 2026	Unknown	Unknown	United Arab Emirates Air Force, French Air and Space Force, and United States Air Force (USAF).
Al Minhad Air Base	28 February 2026	0	0	United Arab Emirates Air Force, Royal Air Force and Australian Defence Force.
Etihad Towers complex	1 March 2026	0	2	A drone was intercepted in the proximity of the Etihad Towers complex, near to the Israeli embassy, and upon being intercepted its debris damaged the towers and caused minor injuries to a woman and her child.
Camp de la Paix in Abu Dhabi	1 March 2026	0	0	
Al-Salam Naval Base	1 March 2026	0	0	Iranian drones targeted a warehouse at Al-Salam Naval Base in Abu Dhabi, causing a fire in two containers storing general materials.
Amazon Web Services data centre	1 March 2026	0	0	Around 04:30 PST (12:30 GMT), according to Amazon, an Amazon Web Services data centre within the UAE was "impacted by objects that struck" it, resulting in "sparks and fire". Reuters reported that this resulted in a complete power cut and shutdown of the centre with the involvement of local fire department crews, leading to a temporary connectivity outage of the availability zone impacted.
Port of Jebel Ali	1 March 2026	Unknown	Unknown	

=== Jordan ===
Airstrike target	Date	Fatalities	Injuries	Casualties and damage
Amman	28 February 2026	0	0	Jordan said that its armed forces had shot down two Iranian ballistic missiles targeting its territory and that it had handled 54 reports of falling debris that caused material damage but no casualties.
US military base near Erbil and a Bundeswehr field camp, Eastern Jordan,	1 March 2026	0	1	Iranian missiles and drones also struck a US military base near Erbil and a Bundeswehr field camp in eastern Jordan, injuring one American soldier.

=== Saudi Arabia ===
Airstrike target	Date	Fatalities	Injuries	Casualties and damage
Riyadh	28 February 2026	Unknown	Unknown	Saudi Arabia stated it had intercepted Iranian attacks against the capital.
Riyadh	2 March 2026	Unknown	Unknown	The Ministry of Defense reported that the United States Embassy in Riyadh was targeted by two drones, according to initial assessments, causing a limited fire and minor material damage to the building.
Eastern Province	28 February 2026	Unknown	Unknown	Saudi Arabia stated it had intercepted Iranian attacks against the province.
Prince Sultan Airbase	1 March 2026	0	0	Saudi Arabia stated that they had managed to intercept various missiles attempting to target Prince Sultan Airbase.
King Khalid International Airport	1 March 2026	0	0	Saudi Arabia stated that they had managed to intercept various missiles attempting to target King Khalid International Airport.
Ras Tanura Aramco refinery	2 March 2026	Unknown	Unknown	Saudi Arabia stated they had managed to intercept two Iranian drones targeting the Aramco oil refinery in Ras Tanura. Debris from the interceptions set fire to part of the plant, but they were put out before significant damage occurred.
Embassy of the United States, Riyadh	3 March 2026	0	0	An Iranian drone attacked the US embassy in Riyadh, causing minor damage.
SAMREF refinery − Yanbu	19 March 2026	0	0	An Iranian drone attacked the SAMREF refinery jointly owned by Saudi Aramco and ExxonMobil in the Red Sea port city of Yanbu, marking the first time that Iran directly targeted a facility in the Red Sea region. The strike was likely in retaliation to an an Israeli strike on Iran’s South Pars gas field. Crude loadings were briefly halted and personnel evacuated, though operations resumed later that day after authorities assessed the damage as minimal.
Prince Sultan Airbase	21-28 March 2026	0	29	At least 29 US servicemen were wounded including 5 seriously by Iranian missile and drone attacks on Prince Sultan Airbase, Saudi Arabia. Multiple US tanker aircraft were damaged as well.

=== Syria ===
Airstrike target	Date	Fatalities	Injuries	Casualties and damage
Ain Tarma	1 March 2026	Unknown	Unknown	Debris of an Iranian missile fell in Ain Tarma in Syria.

=== Iraq ===
Airstrike target	Date	Fatalities	Injuries	Casualties and damage
Erbil International Airport	28 February 2026	0	0	Iranian aerial attacks targeted infrastructure hosting US military and civilian personnel, however, according to local media reports, most missiles and drones had been intercepted.
US Consulate General in Erbil	28 February 2026	0	0	Iranian aerial attacks targeted infrastructure hosting US military and civilian personnel, however, according to local media reports, most missiles and drones had been intercepted.
U.S. Victory Base near Baghdad International Airport	2 March 2026	0	0	Two drones targeted the U.S. Victory Base near Baghdad International Airport, one of which reportedly struck the base.
Iraqi Kurdistan	5 March 2026	Unknown	Unknown	Iran launched three missiles into Iraqi Kurdistan claiming to target Kurdish bases

=== Turkey ===
Airstrike target	Date	Fatalities	Injuries	Casualties and damage
Unknown	4 March 2026	0	0	NATO air and missile defense installations in Turkey and the Eastern Mediterranean intercepted a ballistic missile that was bound for Turkey, with the anti-ballistic munition falling in Dörtyol, Hatay. Turkey then asserted its "right to retaliate." Iranian ambassador in Ankara was shortly after summoned to the Ministry of Foreign Affairs, in which Iran denied any involvement. It was an Arleigh Burke-class destroyer of the United States Navy that engaged the ballistic missile, utilizing an RIM-161 Standard Missile 3, video analysis of the debris suggests. The Spanish government also stated that its MIM-104 Patriot battery that was deployed in Turkey for NATO support mission "assisted" the interception.
Unknown	9 March 2026	0	0	A ballistic missile was downed over Gaziantep. The debris was removed by the security services and there were no casualties reported. The country's defense ministry released another firm statement, reiterating that Turkey will "decisively" respond to any threat against its soil. NATO eventually deployed an additional MIM-104 Patriot battery in Turkey's Malatya and the Turkish authorities took "national level precautions" in an attempt to bolster the country's air and missile defense capabilities.
Unknown	13 March 2026	0	0	A ballistic missile was intercepted by NATO air defenses, near Incirlik Air Base.

=== Akrotiri and Dhekelia ===
Airstrike target	Date	Fatalities	Injuries	Casualties and damage
RAF Akrotiri	1 March 2026	0	0	UK defence secretary John Healey stated that Iran had fired two missiles towards British bases on Cyprus, but added that he did not believe they were under attack. Defence Minister of Cyprus Vasilis Palmas later denied that missiles were launched at Cyprus.
RAF Akrotiri	2 March 2026	0	0	An SMS message sent to base personnel stated that "a small Drone [...] impacted the airfield [...] There are [were] no casualties but there [was] minor damage."

=== Azerbaijan (alleged) ===
Airstrike target	Date	Fatalities	Injuries	Missing	Casualties and damage
Nakhchivan, Shakarabad	5 March 2026	0	4	0	One drone fell on the terminal of the Nakhchivan International Airport and another fell near a school in the village of Shakarabad.

=== West Bank ===
Airstrike target	Date	Fatalities	Injuries	Missing	Casualties and damage
Beit Awwa	18 March 2026	4	13	0	A missile strike hit a beauty salon, killing 4 women and injuring 4 others.

=== United States ships ===
The IRGC claimed that it struck the USS Abraham Lincoln with four missiles. US CENTCOM has stated that the carrier was not struck and asserted that it is fully operational.

On 11 March 2026, an oil tanker named Safesea Vishnu, which was flying the Marshall Islands flag and was owned by a U.S. company, was attacked by Iranian explosive boats in the waters near Basra, Iraq. The attack caused the ship to catch fire. One Indian team member died in the attack. The Indian embassy in Baghdad stated that the remaining 15 Indian crew members on the ship have been evacuated to safety.

=== Thailand ships ===
The Mayuree Naree was a Thai-owned bulk ship that was struck by two unknown projectiles around 11 nautical miles north of Oman after it had left a port in the United Arab Emirates. The attack started a fire in the engine room. Twenty crew members were evacuated by the Omani Navy, while three others remained on the damaged vessel as the minimum crew member awaiting rescue.

== Casualties by country ==
Casualties by country
Country	Killed	Injured	Prisoner-of-war
Total	8,000–10,600	48,775–54,805	3
Iran	3,684 (HRANA); 3,528 (MOHME); 3,375 (WHO/OCHA); 7,650 (Hengaw); 6,000 (IDF)	33,000 (MOHME); 33,806 (WHO/OCHA); 15,000 (IDF)	3
Lebanon	4,386 (Lebanese Health Ministry); 1,000 (Hezbollah); 2,500 (IDF)	12,407 (Lebanese Health Ministry); 10,000 (IDF)	
Yemen	1,282 (Yemeni Health Ministry); 1,600 (PLC/NRF); 959 (WHO)	5,890 (Yemeni Health Ministry); 1,500 (PLC/NRF); 4,207 (WHO)	
Iraq	146 (Note: See Casualties of the 2026 Iran war#Iraq)	525	
Israel	73	7,841	
Saudi Arabia	31	473	
United States	23 (CENTCOM/DOD); 26 (Independent estimates) (Note: Including three civilian contractors killed and at least five injured during Iranian and PMF strikes.)	865 (CENTCOM/DOD); 900 (Independent estimates)	
United Arab Emirates	15	245	
Oman	14	35	
Kuwait	12	190	
Palestine	4	13	
Syria	4	6	
Bahrain	2	51	
Qatar	1	21	
French military	1	7	
British military	1	0	
Jordan	0	29	
Azerbaijan	0	4	
United Nations Interim Force in Lebanon
Indonesia	4	5	
France	2	2	
Serbia	1	0	
Ghana	0	4	
Malaysia	0	2	
Spain	0	1	
El Salvador	0	1	
Poland	0	1	
Nepal	0	1	

== Number of attacks by ballistic missiles and drones/UAVs ==
Country / Territory	Missiles	Drones/UAVs	Ref.
Total	1,770+	3,955+	
United Arab Emirates	563	2,256	
Saudi Arabia	3+	83	
Qatar	101	63	
Bahrain	191	515	
Oman	0	14	
Kuwait	178	154	
Jordan	60	59	
Iraq	20	40	
Azerbaijan	0	3	
Turkey	4	0	
Akrotiri and Dhekelia	0	3	
Israel	650	765	

== See also ==
- Attacks on the United States
- List of Iranian officials killed during the 2026 Iran war
- List of ships attacked during the 2026 Iran war
- List of attacks during the Twelve-Day War
