= Mohammad Shirazi =

Mohammad Shirazi may refer to:

- Mohammad al-Shirazi (1928–2001) an Iraqi Shia marja' and political activist.
- Mohammad Shirazi (general) (?–2 March 2026) an Iranian military general who served as the head of the Military Office of the Supreme Leader from 1989 until his was killed during the 2026 Iran war.
