= List of Iranian officials killed during the 2026 Iran war =

The following is a list of confirmed Iranian officials killed during the 2026 Iran war. Additional reports indicate four unnamed top officials from the Ministry of Intelligence were killed, contributing to the estimated total of around 50 officials.

== Confirmed ==
Portrait	Name	Position	Date of death	Notes
	Ali Khamenei	Supreme Leader of Iran	28 February 2026	Killed in an airstrike on his compound in Tehran
	Rear Admiral; Ali Shamkhani	Secretary of the Iranian Defence Council	28 February 2026	Killed at the Iranian Defence Council meeting
	Major General; Mohammad Pakpour	Commander-in-Chief of the Islamic Revolutionary Guard Corps	28 February 2026	Killed at the Iranian Defence Council meeting
	Major General; Abdolrahim Mousavi	Chief of the General Staff of the Iranian Armed Forces	28 February 2026	Killed at the Iranian Defence Council meeting
	Brigadier General; Aziz Nasirzadeh	Minister of Defence	28 February 2026	Killed at the Iranian Defence Council meeting
	Brigadier General; Hossein Jabal Amelian	Head of the Organization of Defensive Innovation and Research (SPND), Deputy Minister of Defence	28 February 2026	Killed at the Iranian Defence Council meeting
	Brigadier General; Reza Mozaffari Nia	Former Head of the Organization of Defensive Innovation and Research (SPND), Deputy Minister of Defence	28 February 2026	Killed at the Iranian Defence Council meeting
	Mohammad Baseri	Senior Intelligence Ministry official	28 February 2026	Killed in US–Israeli strikes
	Yahya Hosseini Panjaki	Deputy Minister of Intelligence for Israel affairs, Head of Directorate for Internal Security of Ministry of Intelligence and Security (MOIS)	28 February 2026	Killed in Israeli strikes on leadership in Tehran
	Brigadier General; Saleh Asadi	Deputy for Intelligence of the Armed Forces General Staff and Head of Intelligence Directorate, Khatam al-Anbiya Central Headquarters	28 February 2026	Killed at the Iranian Defence Council meeting
	Brigadier General; Mohammad Shirazi	Head of the Military Office of the Supreme Leader	28 February 2026	Killed in an airstrike alongside Khamenei
	Brigadier General; Akbar Ebrahimzadeh	Deputy Head of the Military Office of the Supreme Leader	28 February 2026	Killed in an airstrike alongside Khamenei
	Brigadier General; Gholamreza Rezaian	Head of the Iranian Police Intelligence Organization	2 March 2026	Killed in US-Israeli strikes on command centers
	Brigadier General; Bahram Hosseini Motlagh	Head of Planning and Operations for the General Staff of the Armed Forces	2 March 2026	Killed in US-Israeli strikes on command centers
	Brigadier General; Hassan-Ali Tajik	Head of the Logistics Department of the Armed Forces General Staff	2 March 2026	Killed in US-Israeli strikes on command centers
	Brigadier General; Mohsen Darrebaghi	Deputy for Logistics and Support, General Staff of the Armed Forces of the Islamic Republic of Iran	2 March 2026	Killed in US-Israeli strikes on command centers
	Mohsen Mahdavi Kalateh	Deputy Minister of Intelligence	3 March 2026	Killed in airstrikes on leadership
	Ali Hashemi	Deputy Commander of the Islamic Revolutionary Guard Corps Saheb al-Zaman in Isfahan	8 March 2026	Killed in airstrikes on leadership
	Mohammadreza Saqafifar	Special Assistant to Supreme Leader Ali Khamenei	8 March 2026	Killed in airstrikes on leadership
	Asadollah Badfar	Head of the paramilitary Basij forces, General Staff of the Iranian Armed Forces	9 March 2026 (funeral)	Killed in airstrikes on leadership
	Esmail Dehghan	Senior Commander of the Islamic Revolutionary Guard Corps Aerospace Force	10 March 2026	Killed in airstrikes in Arak
	Akbar Ghaffari	Deputy Minister of Intelligence	12 March 2026	Killed in strikes on leadership in Tehran
	Naqi Mohaddesnia	Head of Clergy Affairs of the Islamic Revolutionary Guard Corps in East Azerbaijan	12 March 2026	Killed in Israeli attacks
	Brigadier General; Abolqasem Babaeian	Chief of Staff of the Khatam al-Anbiya Central Headquarters	14 March 2026	Killed in strikes in Tehran
	Brigadier General; Abdullah Jalali-Nasab	Senior officer of Khatam al-Anbiya Emergency Command's intelligence branch	14 March 2026	Killed in an Israeli attack on leadership
	Brigadier General; Ali Larijani	Secretary of the Supreme National Security Council	17 March 2026	Killed in Israeli strikes on leadership in Tehran
	Brigadier General; Gholamreza Soleimani	Head of the paramilitary Basij forces	17 March 2026	Killed in Israeli strikes on the Basij meeting in Tehran
	Brigadier General; Esmail Ahmadi	Head of Intelligence for the paramilitary Basij forces	17 March 2026	Killed in Israeli strikes on the Basij meeting in Tehran; deputy to Gholamreza Soleimani
	Alireza Bayat	Deputy for Internal Security of the Supreme National Security Council	17 March 2026	Killed in Israeli strikes on leadership in Tehran
	Morteza Larijani	Assistant for Internal Security of the Supreme National Security Council	17 March 2026	Killed in Israeli strikes on leadership in Tehran; son of Ali Larijani
	Ali Bateni	Deputy Secretary of the Supreme National Security Council	17 March 2026	Killed in Israeli strikes on leadership in Tehran
	Qassem Qoreishi	Deputy Head of the paramilitary Basij forces	17 March 2026	Killed in Israeli strikes on the Basij meeting in Tehran
	Azim Esmaili Khosrowabadi	Deputy Commander of the paramilitary Basij forces	17 March 2026	Killed in Israeli strikes on the Basij meeting in Tehran
	Esmaeil Khatib	Minister of Intelligence	18 March 2026	Killed in strikes on leadership
	Afshin Naghshbandi	Representative of General Staff of the Armed Forces to the paramilitary Basij forces	19 March 2026 (reported date)	Killed in airstrikes on leadership
	Second Brigadier General; Ali Mohammad Naini	Spokesperson of the Islamic Revolutionary Guard Corps and Deputy for Public Relations	20 March 2026	Killed in Israeli strikes on leadership
	Mehdi Qureishi	Commander of the Islamic Revolutionary Guard Corps Aerospace Force	20 March 2026	Killed in strikes on leadership in Isfahan
	Mehdi Rostami Shomastan	Senior Commander in the Ministry of Intelligence	20 March 2026	Killed in Israeli strikes on leadership
	Ghadir Azarian	Commander of the Islamic Revolutionary Guard Corps in East Azerbaijan	21 March 2026 (reported date)	Killed in airstrikes on leadership
	Ebrahim Mortazavi-Nasb	Commander of a paramilitary Basij unit in Shiraz	22 March 2026 (reported date)	Killed in US-Israeli strikes
	Commodore; Alireza Tangsiri	Commander of the Islamic Revolutionary Guard Corps Navy	26 March 2026	Killed in US-Israeli strikes in Bandar Abbas
	Behnam Rezaei	Head of the IRGC Navy Intelligence Directorate	26 March 2026	Killed in US-Israeli strikes
	Brigadier General; Jamshid Eshaghi	Chief of the Office of Budget and Financial Affairs within the Armed Forces General Staff	31 March 2026	Killed in US-Israeli strikes
	Mohammad Ali Fathalizadeh	Commander of the Fatehin unit	1 April 2026	Killed in US-Israeli strikes
	Brigadier General; Majid Khademi	Head of the Intelligence Organization and Intelligence Protection Organization of the Islamic Revolutionary Guard Corps	6 April 2026	Killed in Israeli strikes
	Brigadier General; Yazdan Mir	Commander of Unit 840 of the IRGC Quds Force	6 April 2026	Killed in Israeli strikes; a.k.a. Asghar Bagheri
	Kamal Kharazi	Minister of Foreign Affairs (1997–2005)	9 April 2026	Succumbed to wounds from US–Israeli strikes

=== Iranian officials in Lebanon ===
Name	Position	Date of death	Notes
Reza Khazaei	IRGC Quds Force Official	3 March 2026	
Majid Hosseinikandesar	Head of Finance of the IRGC Quds Force (Lebanon Corps)	8 March 2026	Killed in Israeli drone strike on Ramada Plaza Hotel, Raouché, Beirut
Alireza Bi-Azar	Intelligence Officer of the IRGC Quds Force (Lebanon Corps)	8 March 2026	Killed in Israeli drone strike on Ramada Plaza Hotel, Raouché, Beirut
Ahmad Rasouli	Intelligence Officer of the IRGC Quds Force (Palestine Corps)	8 March 2026	Killed in Israeli drone strike on Ramada Plaza Hotel, Raouché, Beirut
Hossein Ahmadlou	Israel Desk Officer of the IRGC Quds Force ("Zionist File")	8 March 2026	Killed in Israeli drone strike on Ramada Plaza Hotel, Raouché, Beirut
Abuzar Mohammadi	IRGC Missile Operations Commander in Hezbollah's missile unit	12 March 2026	Killed in Israeli attacks; targeted strikes occurred on 10 March
Davoud Alizadeh	Commander of the IRGC Quds Force (Lebanon Corps)	12 March 2026	Killed in Israeli attacks

== Impact ==
On 18 March, the Hengaw Organization for Human Rights estimated that 5,300+ members of the Iranian military forces had been killed in the attacks.

Iranian state media declared a period of 40 days of mourning (the Arba'in) and seven days of public holidays in the wake of Ali Khamenei's death, and an Interim Leadership Council was appointed pending the election of a new Supreme Leader. On 7 March, the Assembly of Experts announced Mojtaba Khamenei, son of Ali Khamenei, as the new Supreme Leader. International observers including France, Russia, and the United Nations said that regime collapse or escalation of the fighting could occur. U.S. and Israeli officials said that the operation is a step toward regime change, while Iran has retaliated.

== See also ==
- Casualties of the Twelve-Day War
