= Gholamhossein Mohammadnia =

Iranian diplomat (born 1970)

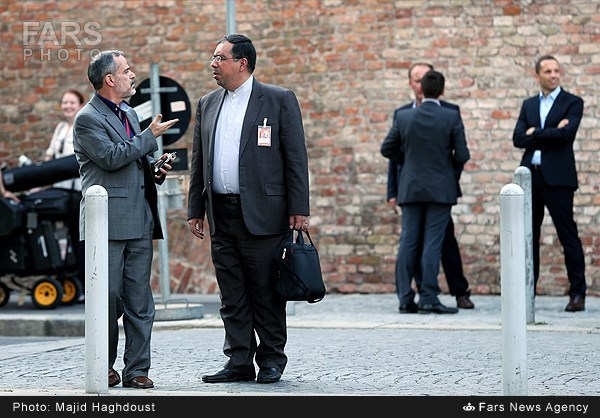
Gholamhossein Mohammadnia (right) and Morteza Ghoroghi (left) at the 2014 Iran nuclear talks in Vienna

Gholamhossein Mohammadnia (born 3 August 1970) is an Iranian Ministry of Intelligence and Security (MOIS) official. He is also a former member of the nuclear talks negotiations team. He was Iran's ambassador to Albania from August, 2016, until December, 2018, when he was expelled from the country for "damaging its national security."

The foreign ministry stated that the decision to expel Mohammadnia was made in coordination with "ally countries" due to their "actions against diplomatic rules." US officials welcomed the decision, stating that it communicated that "terrorist activities in Europe" would not be tolerated.

Some media reports see his expulsion in connection with a failed terrorist plot in 2016 against the Israeli soccer team in Tirana, while others link it to a foiled terrorist plot against the opposition group People's Mujahedin of Iran. In 2022, Albania expelled the remaining Iranian embassy staff from the country due to a cyberattack.

The Office of Foreign Assets Control (OFAC) also imposed sanctions on Mohammadnia in 2025 for playing a role in the disappearance of Robert Levinson. The Treasury Department said that Mohammadnia "led an effort to blame Mr. Levinson's detention on a terrorist group in Pakistan's Baluchistan region in order to shift blame away from the Iranian government."
