= Mohsen Darrebaghi =

Iranian general (1963–2026)

Amir Mohsen Darrebaghi
- محسن دره‌باغی
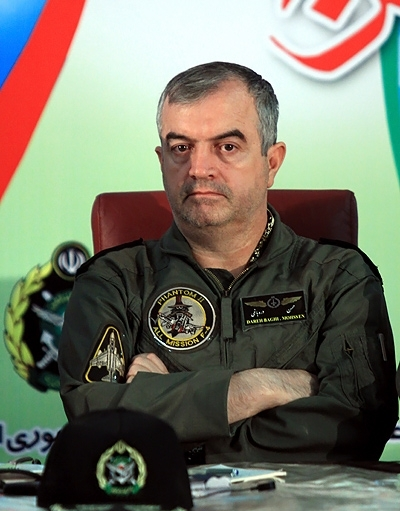
- Darrebaghi in 2011
- Born: 23 October 1963; Qom, Pahlavi Iran
- Died: 28 February 2026; Tehran, Iran
- Cause of death: Assassination by Airstrike
- Military career
- Allegiance: Iran
- Branch: Islamic Republic of Iran Air Force
- Service years: c. 1980–2026
- Rank: Brigadier General; Major General (posthumous)
- Commands: Deputy for Logistics and Support of the General Staff of the Iranian Armed Forces (2016–2026); Deputy for Logistics, Support, and Industrial Research of the Artesh (2013–2016); Deputy Commander of the Iranian Air Force (2008–2013); Commander of the 10th Tactical Fighter Base (Chabahar) (?–2008)
- Conflicts: Iran–Iraq War; Insurgency in Sistan and Balochistan; Syrian civil war; Iranian intervention in Syria; War in Iraq (2013–2017); Iranian intervention in Iraq; Iran–PJAK conflict; Western Iran clashes; 2024 Iran–Israel conflict; Twelve-Day War; 2026 Iran war X

Mohsen Darrebaghi (Persian: محسن دره‌باغی; 23 October 1963 – 28 February 2026) was an Iranian brigadier general and fighter pilot in the Islamic Republic of Iran Air Force. He served in various command roles within the Iranian military, including as deputy for logistics and support at the General Staff of the Iranian Armed Forces. Darrebaghi was killed in the 2026 Israeli–United States strikes on Iran.

== Military career ==
Darrebaghi participated as a pilot in the Iran–Iraq War (1980–1988). In the early 2000s, he commanded Chabahar Air Base. From 2008 to 2013, he was deputy commander of the Iranian Air Force. In June 2010, he announced upcoming large-scale aerial manoeuvres involving advanced air-to-ground weaponry, with participation from various Iranian fighter jets including F-4, F-5, F-7, Sukhoi Su-24, and Mirage F-1 models.

Between 2013 and 2016, he served as deputy for logistics and support in the Iranian Army. From 2016 until his death, he held the position of deputy for logistics and support at the General Staff of the Iranian Armed Forces. His role included overseeing support and industrial research operations.

== Assassination ==
Darrebaghi was killed on 28 February 2026 during United States-Israeli airstrikes targeting Iranian military leadership amid the 2026 Israeli–United States strikes on Iran. Iranian authorities confirmed his death alongside six other senior commanders in a statement from the Armed Forces General Staff.

== See also ==
- List of Iranian officials killed during the 2026 Iran war
