= Mohammad Baseri =

Iranian intelligence officer (1972–2026)

- محمد باصری
- Born: 19 September 1972; Semnan, Iran
- Died: 28 February 2026 (aged 53); Tehran, Iran
- Cause of death: Assassination by airstrike
- Occupation: Intelligence officer
- Employer: Ministry of Intelligence (Iran)
- Known for: Involvement in the Disappearance of Robert Levinson

Mohammad Baseri (Persian: محمد باصری; 19 September 1972 – 28 February 2026) was an Iranian intelligence officer who served in the Ministry of Intelligence and Security (MOIS). He was implicated by the United States government in the 2007 abduction and subsequent detention of retired FBI agent Robert Levinson, who disappeared on Kish Island in Iran. Baseri was sanctioned by the U.S. Department of the Treasury in 2020 for his alleged role in the case. In 2025, the FBI issued a seeking information notice regarding his involvement.

Baseri held a high-ranking position within the MOIS, focusing on counterespionage operations both inside and outside Iran. He was described by U.S. authorities as having participated in sensitive national security investigations and collaborating with foreign intelligence services to advance Iranian interests, including actions against the United States.

He was killed in a joint U.S.-Israeli airstrike on Tehran on 28 February 2026, amid a series of military actions targeting Iranian officials.

== Career ==
Baseri served as a senior officer in Iran's Ministry of Intelligence and Security, where he was involved in counterespionage activities. According to U.S. sources, he oversaw operations related to national security and worked with intelligence officials from other countries. He was codenamed "Sanai" in some intelligence reports.

== Involvement in Robert Levinson case ==
Baseri was accused by the United States of playing a key role in the abduction, detention, and probable death of Robert Levinson, a retired FBI agent who disappeared in Iran in March 2007. Levinson was believed to have been on an unauthorized CIA mission at the time of his disappearance on Kish Island. In December 2020, the U.S. Treasury Department sanctioned Baseri and fellow MOIS officer Ahmad Khazai for their alleged involvement in the case. In February 2025, the FBI released seeking information posters for Baseri and Khazai, offering rewards for information related to Levinson's case.

== Assassination ==
Baseri was killed on 28 February 2026 in a joint U.S.-Israeli airstrike on Tehran. Iranian state media reported his death alongside other senior officials targeted in the strikes.

== See also ==
- Disappearance of Robert Levinson
- List of Iranian officials killed during the 2026 Iran war
- Ministry of Intelligence (Iran)
