= Gholamreza Rezaian =

Iranian police intelligence officer (1955–2026)

- غلامرضا رضائیان
- Rezaian in an undated photo

Chief of the Islamic Republic of Iran Police Intelligence Organization
- In office 29 January 2023 – 28 February 2026
- President: Ebrahim Raisi; Mohammad Mokhber (acting); Masoud Pezeshkian
- Supreme Leader: Ali Khamenei
- Preceded by: Mohammad Babaei
- Succeeded by: Hamid Alinaghiyanpour

Chief of the Economic Security Police
- In office 2021–2022
- President: Ebrahim Raisi
- Prime Minister: Mir-Hossein Mousavi
- Supreme Leader: Ali Khamenei
- Preceded by: Mohammad Reza Moghimi
- Succeeded by: Hossein Rahimi

Chief of Police General Inspection
- In office 2019–2021
- President: Hassan Rouhani; Ebrahim Raisi
- Supreme Leader: Ali Khamenei

Chief of the Iranian Public Security Police
- In office 28 May 2014 – 4 August 2019
- President: Hassan Rouhani
- Supreme Leader: Ali Khamenei
- Preceded by: Hossein Ashtari
- Succeeded by: Mohammad Babaei

Chief of the Iranian Immigration & Passport Police Office
- In office 2008–2014
- President: Mahmoud Ahmadinejad; Hassan Rouhani
- Supreme Leader: Ali Khamenei

Personal details
- Born: 3 January 1955 shiraz, Pahlavi Iran
- Died: 28 February 2026 (aged 71) Tehran, Iran
- Cause of death: Assassination by Airstrike

Military service
- Allegiance: Iran
- Branch/service: Islamic Revolutionary Committees; Police Command of the Islamic Republic of Iran
- Years of service: 1979–2026
- Rank: Brigadier General; Major General (posthumously)
- Battles/wars: Iran–Iraq War; Twelve-Day War; 2026 Iran war X

Gholamreza Rezaian (Persian: غلامرضا رضائیان; 3 January 1955 – 28 February 2026) was an Iranian brigadier general who served as the commander of the Islamic Republic of Iran Police Intelligence Organization. The organization, formed in 2022, handles intelligence duties within Iran's national police force.

Rezaian held the position of commander at the time of his death in 2026. He was killed during a series of United States and Israeli airstrikes on Iran amid escalating regional tensions.

== Career ==
He served as the chief of the NAJA Immigration and Foreign Nationals Police from 2008 to 2014, and worked as the chief of the NAJA Intelligence and Public Security Police between 2014 and 2019. Rezaeian held the position of head of the NAJA General Inspection from 2019 to 2021, served as the chief of the NAJA Economic Security Police from 2021 to 2022.

Rezaian served as the commander of the Islamic Republic of Iran Police Intelligence Organization, an intelligence agency under the Police Command of the Islamic Republic of Iran (FARAJA). The organization handles domestic intelligence and security operations within Iran's national police framework, following administrative changes around 2022 that restructured police intelligence functions.

== Assassination ==
On 28 February 2026, Rezaian was killed in airstrikes conducted by the United States and Israel on targets in Tehran. Iranian media, including Fars News Agency, reported his death the following day, stating that he had been targeted as part of broader attacks on Iranian leadership and military figures. The strikes also resulted in the deaths of other high-ranking Iranian officials.

== See also ==
- Police Command of the Islamic Republic of Iran
- List of Iranian officials killed during the 2026 Iran war
