= Organization of Defensive Innovation and Research =

Iranian research and government defensive agency

Organization of Defensive Innovation and Research of Iran (S. P. N. D.)
- سازمان پژوهش و نوآوری دفاعی (سپند)
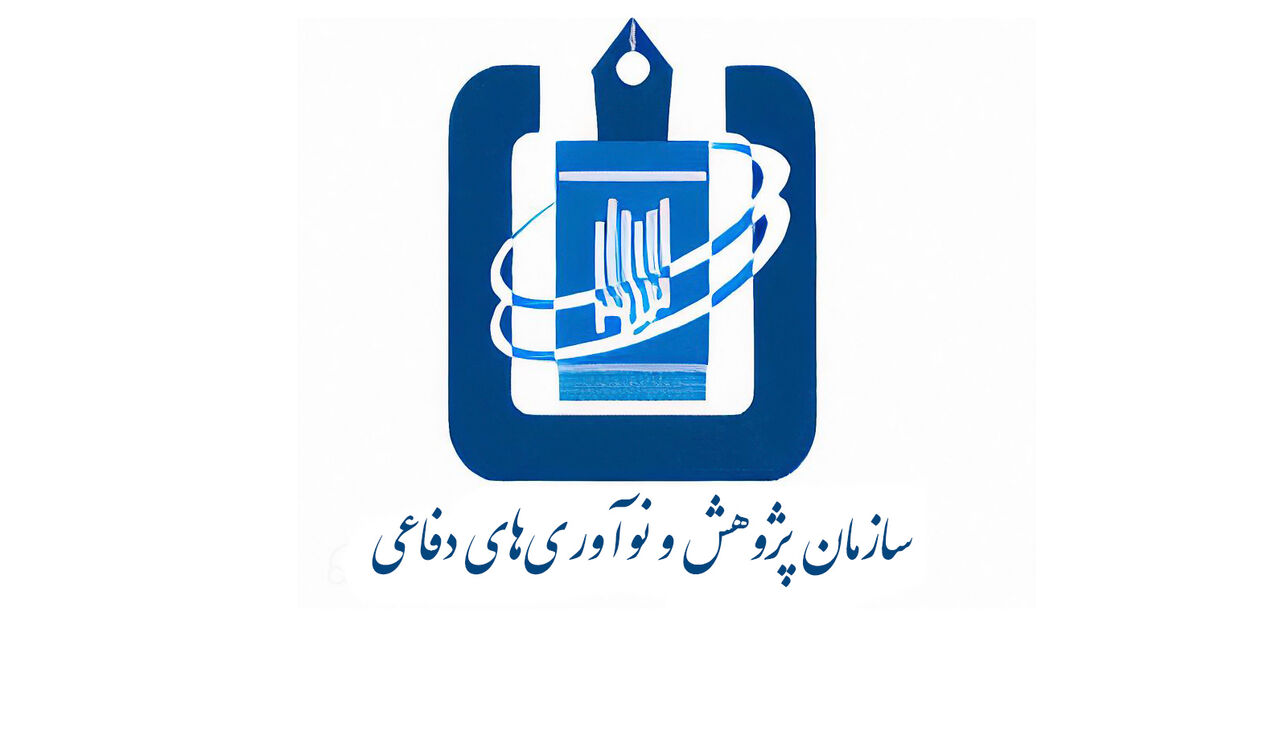
- Abbreviation: S. P. N. D.
- Nickname: SEPAND
- Pronunciation: Sazman-e Pazhouheshhaye Novin-e Defa’i
- Established: 2011
- Founder: Mohsen Fakhrizadeh
- Founded at: Malek-Ashtar University of Technology
- Type: Governmental Organization
- Legal status: Active foundation
- Purpose: Extend defensive sciences and technologies of Islamic Republic of Iran
- Professional title: Sepand سپند
- Headquarters: Nobonyad neighborhood, Tehran, Iran
- Location: Tehran, Isfahan, Shiraz, Zahedan, Ahvaz, Islamic Republic of Iran
- Coordinates: 35.78108°N 51.49309°E
- Services: Nuclear radiopharmaceutical production; Carrier military drones production; Ballistic and cruise missiles engineerings; Production of nuclear submarines; Development of heavy explosive devices; ...; etc.
- Official language: Persian
- Owner: Government of Islamic Republic of Iran
- Head: Brigadier General Reza Mozaffari Nia X
- Key people: Mohsen Fakhrizadeh; Akbar Motalebizadeh; Saeed Borji
- Publication: Interdisciplinary Studies on Strategic Knowledge
- Parent organization: Ministry of Defence and Armed Forces Logistics of Iran; Malek-Ashtar University of Technology
- Subsidiaries: Shahid Karimi Group

The Organization of Defensive Innovation and Research or S.P.N.D. (Persian: سازمان پژوهش‌های نوین دفاعی, romanized: Sazman-e Pazhouheshhaye Novin-e Defa’i and abbreviated سازمان سپند) is a research and development agency of Iran's Ministry of Defence responsible for the development of emerging technologies for use by the military. According to Iranian media, it is the Iranian counterpart of the American DARPA.

== History ==
According to the US, it was established in 2011. The organization was established and led by Mohsen Fakhrizadeh, until his assassination outside Tehran on November 26, 2020.

After Israel's Twelve-Day War with Iran in June 2025 and the assassination of senior Iranian military and scientific officials by Israel, Brigadier General Reza Mozaffari Nia was appointed as the new head of the organization. Nia was assassinated during the 2026 Israeli–United States strikes on Iran in the 2026 Iran War.

== Sanction ==
According to the Israeli officials, later backed up by American intelligence officials, it was tasked with the research and development of nuclear weapons, and took over some of the activities of the Iranian nuclear weapon development AMAD Project. It has been sanctioned by the United States Department of State and United States Department of the Treasury.

According to Al Jazeera, amid the COVID-19 pandemic in Iran, it developed Iran's first COVID-19 testing kits and also FAKHRAVAC, a COVID-19 vaccine that reached clinical trials.

== Heads of the Organization ==
- Mohsen Fakhrizadeh (2010 – 2020)
- Reza Mozaffari Nia (2020 – c. October 2025)
- Hossein Jabal Amelian (c. October 2025 – 28 February 2026)

== See also ==
- Aerospace Industries Organization
- Iran Airports Company
- Iran Electronics Industries
- Iran Insurance Company
- Iranian Central Oil Fields Company
- Iranian Offshore Oil Company
- Marine Industries Organization
- Atmospheric Science and Meteorological Research Center
- Atomic Energy Organization of Iran
- Emergency Medical Services Organization of Iran
- Iranian Defence Council
- Iranian Space Agency
- National Organization for Passive Defense
- Assassinations of Iranian nuclear scientists
- Targeted killing by Israel
- Supreme National Security Council
