= Hossein Jabal Amelian =

Iranian IRGC officer (died 2026)

Sardar Hossein Jabal Amelian
- حسین جبل عاملیان
- Amelian in an undated photo

Deputy Minister of Defense and head of the Organization of Defensive Innovation and Research
- In office October 2025 – 28 February 2026
- President: Masoud Pezeshkian
- Supreme Leader: Ali Khamenei
- Preceded by: Reza Mozaffari Nia
- Succeeded by: ?

Deputy Minister of Defense and head of the Marine Industries Organization
- In office 4 October 2021 – October 2025
- President: Ebrahim Raisi; Mohammad Mokhber (acting); Masoud Pezeshkian
- Supreme Leader: Ali Khamenei
- Preceded by: Amir Rastegari
- Succeeded by: ?

Deputy Minister of Defense and Head of the Defense Industries Educational and Research Institute
- In office ?–2014
- President: Hassan Rouhani
- Supreme Leader: Ali Khamenei
- Preceded by: Abotalib Shafaghat
- Succeeded by: Farhad Amiri

Personal details
- Died: 28 February 2026 Tehran, Iran
- Cause of death: Airstrike

Military service
- Allegiance: Iran
- Branch/service: Islamic Revolutionary Guard Corps
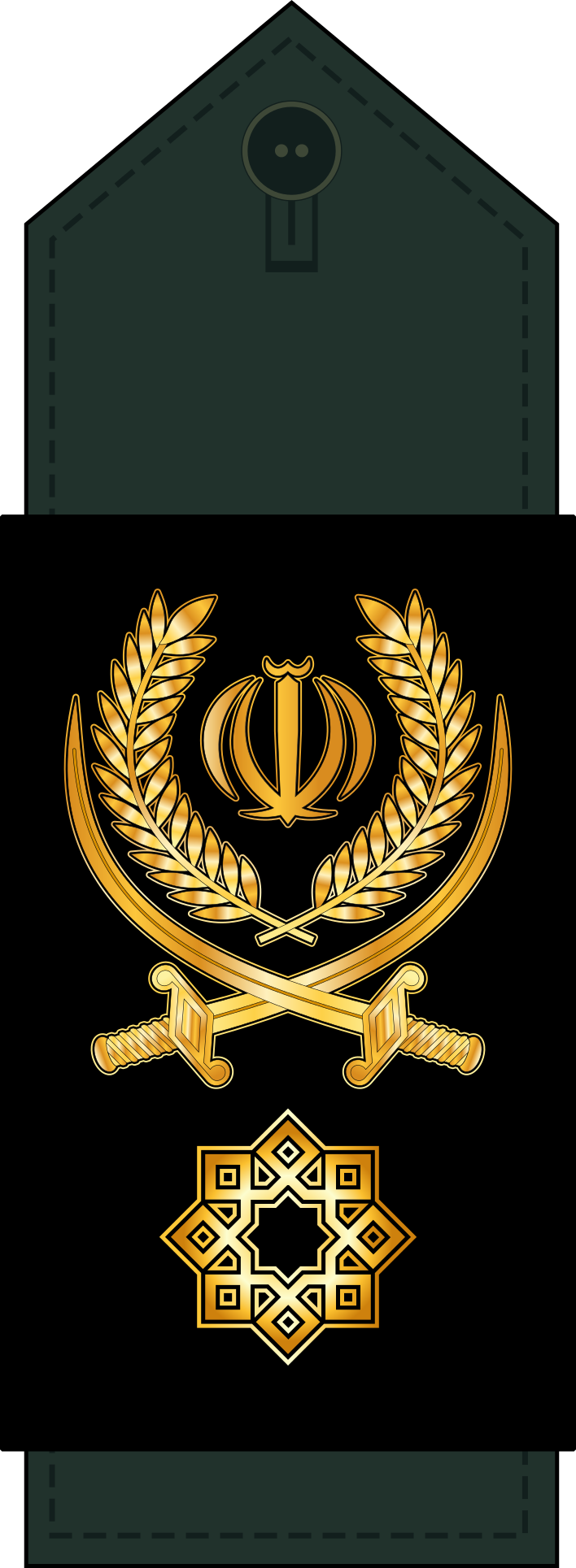
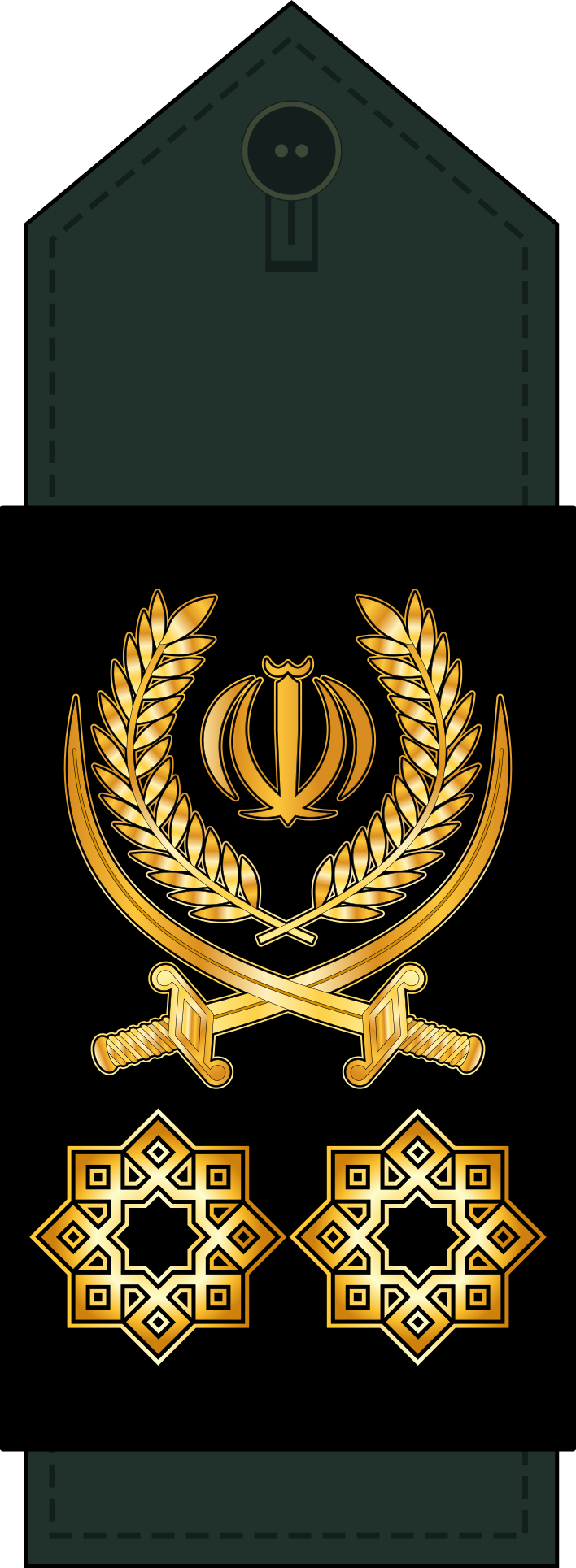
- Rank: Brigadier General; Major General (posthumously)
- Battles/wars: Iran–Iraq War; Twelve-Day War; 2026 Iran war †

Hossein Jabal Amelian (Persian: حسین جبل عاملیان; died 28 February 2026) was an Iranian military officer and brigadier general in the Islamic Revolutionary Guard Corps (IRGC). He served as chairman of Iran's Organization of Defensive Innovation and Research (SPND), an entity engaged in advanced weapons development. Amelian previously headed the Marine Industries Organization within Iran's Ministry of Defence and Armed Forces Logistics. He was killed during the 2026 Israeli–United States strikes on Iran.

== Career ==
Jabal Amelian was appointed president of the Marine Industries Organization of Iran's Ministry of Defence and Armed Forces Logistics in October 2021, succeeding Amir Rastegari. In this role, he contributed to enhancing Iran's naval capabilities.

At the time of his death, Amelian served as chairman of the Organization of Defensive Innovation and Research (SPND), an Iranian defence organisation focused on research and development of advanced technologies, including those related to nuclear, biological, and chemical weapons, according to Israeli military assessments.

== Death ==
Amelian was killed on 28 February 2026 during the opening phase of the 2026 Israeli–United States strikes on Iran. The strikes targeted a high-level security meeting in Tehran attended by senior Iranian officials. According to the Israel Defense Forces (IDF), Amelian was among seven key figures eliminated, including Iran's defence minister Aziz Nasirzadeh and former SPND chairman Reza Mozaffari Nia. The IDF described him as a veteran in weapons development programmes.

== See also ==
- Organization of Defensive Innovation and Research
- List of Iranian officials killed during the 2026 Iran war
