= Bahram Hosseini Motlagh =

Iranian military officer (1963–2026)

Sardar Bahram Hosseini Motlagh
- بهرام حسینی مطلق
- General Motlagh in an undated photo
- Born: 24 January 1963; Tehran, Pahlavi Iran
- Died: 28 February 2026; Tehran, Iran
- Cause of death: Assassination by Airstrike
- Military career
- Allegiance: Iran
- Branch: Islamic Revolutionary Guard Corps
- Service years: 1979–2026
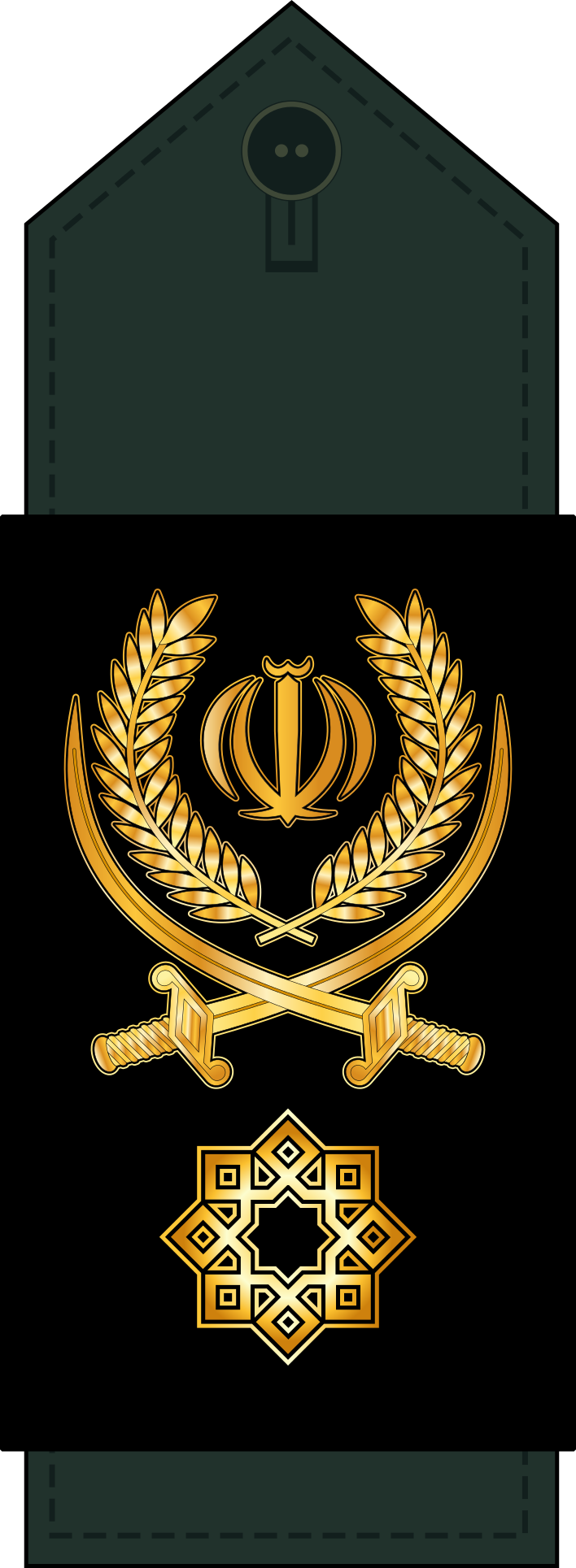
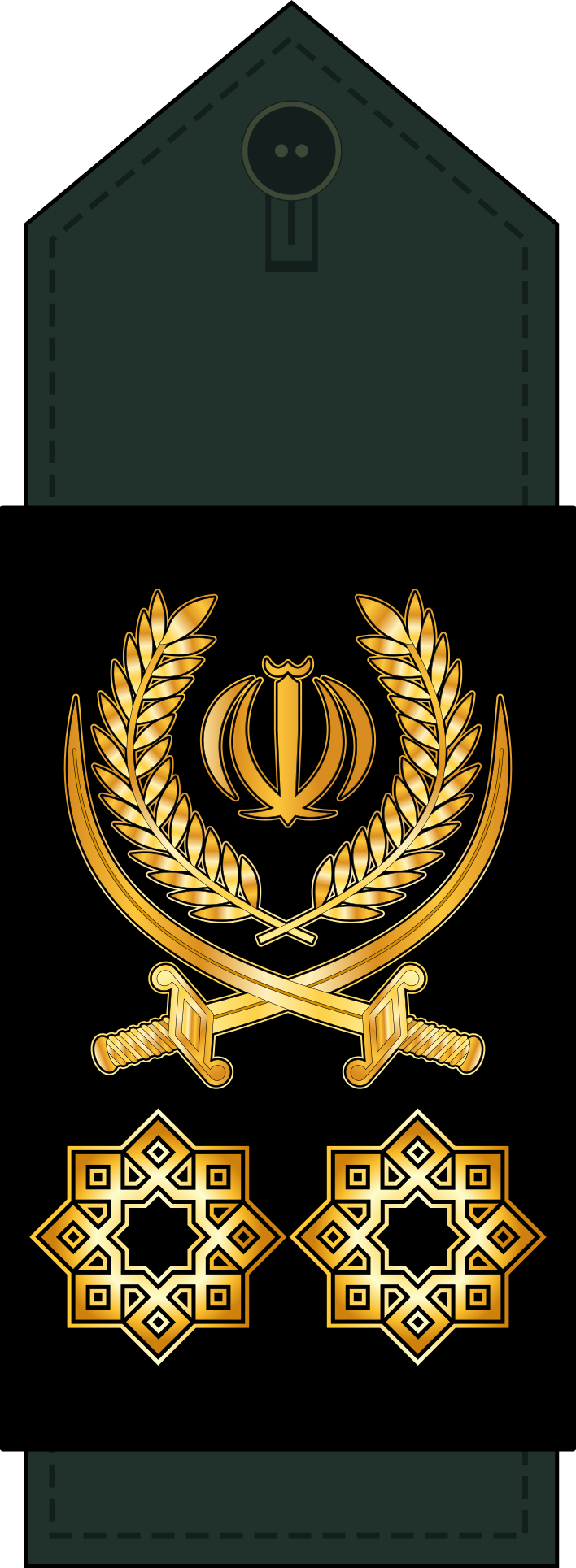
- Rank: Brigadier General; Major General (posthumously)
- Commands: Operations Department of the General Staff of the Armed Forces (2021–2024); Security and Law Enforcement Operations Planning Department of the General Staff of the Armed Forces (2020–2021); IRGC University of Command and Staff (2014–2026); Imam Hassan Corps Alborz (2011–2014); Seyyed al-Shuhada Corps (2009–2011)
- Conflicts: Iran–Iraq War; Twelve-Day War; 2026 Iran war X

Bahram Hosseini Motlagh (Persian: بهرام حسینی مطلق; 24 January 1963 – 28 February 2026) was an Iranian military officer in the Islamic Revolutionary Guard Corps (IRGC). He served in various command roles within the IRGC, including as commander of the Seyed al-Shohada Corps in Tehran Province from 2009 to 2011, during which time the unit was involved in the suppression of protests following the 2009 presidential election. Motlagh was sanctioned by the European Union in 2011 for his role in human rights violations. He later held positions in military education and operations planning at the General Staff of the Armed Forces. He was killed in the 2026 Israeli–United States strikes on Iran.

== Career ==
Motlagh joined the IRGC during the Iran–Iraq War (1980–1988). From 2009 to 2011, he commanded the IRGC's Seyed al-Shohada Corps in Tehran Province. In this role, the corps participated in the suppression of demonstrations against the results of the 2009 Iranian presidential election. Motlagh publicly stated in 2011 that the corps had played a "key role" in quelling the unrest.

From 2011 to 2014, Motlagh commanded the IRGC Alborz Corps in Karaj, a region known to be a major center of anti-government protests. He then served as commander of the IRGC Command and Staff University from 2014 to 2020. In 2020–2021, he was head of the Security and Law Enforcement Operations Planning Department at the General Staff of the Armed Forces of the Islamic Republic of Iran. From 2021 to 2024, he headed the Operations Department at the General Staff. He also served as a member of the teaching staff at Imam Hossein University.

== Sanctions ==
On 12 April 2011, the European Union imposed sanctions on Motlagh, citing his command of the Seyed al-Shohada Corps and its involvement in organising the repression of protests in 2009. The sanctions included a travel ban to EU countries and an asset freeze. He was similarly listed in UK sanctions regimes for human rights violations.

== Assassination ==
Motlagh was killed on 28 February 2026 during the 2026 Israeli–United States strikes on Iran, in coordinated airstrikes on military command infrastructure in Tehran. At the time, he was head of operations planning at the General Staff of the Armed Forces.

== See also ==
- List of Iranian officials killed during the 2026 Iran war
- 2026 Israeli–United States strikes on Iran
