= Saleh Asadi =

Iranian military intelligence officer (1963–2026)

Sardar Saleh Asadi
- صالح اسدی
- Asadi in an undated photo
- Born: 26 November 1963; Shiraz, Pahlavi Iran
- Died: 28 February 2026; Tehran, Iran
- Cause of death: Assassination by Airstrike
- Relatives: Mohammad Jafar Asadi (Brother)
- Military career
- Allegiance: Iran
- Branch: Islamic Revolutionary Guard Corps
- Service years: 1979–2026
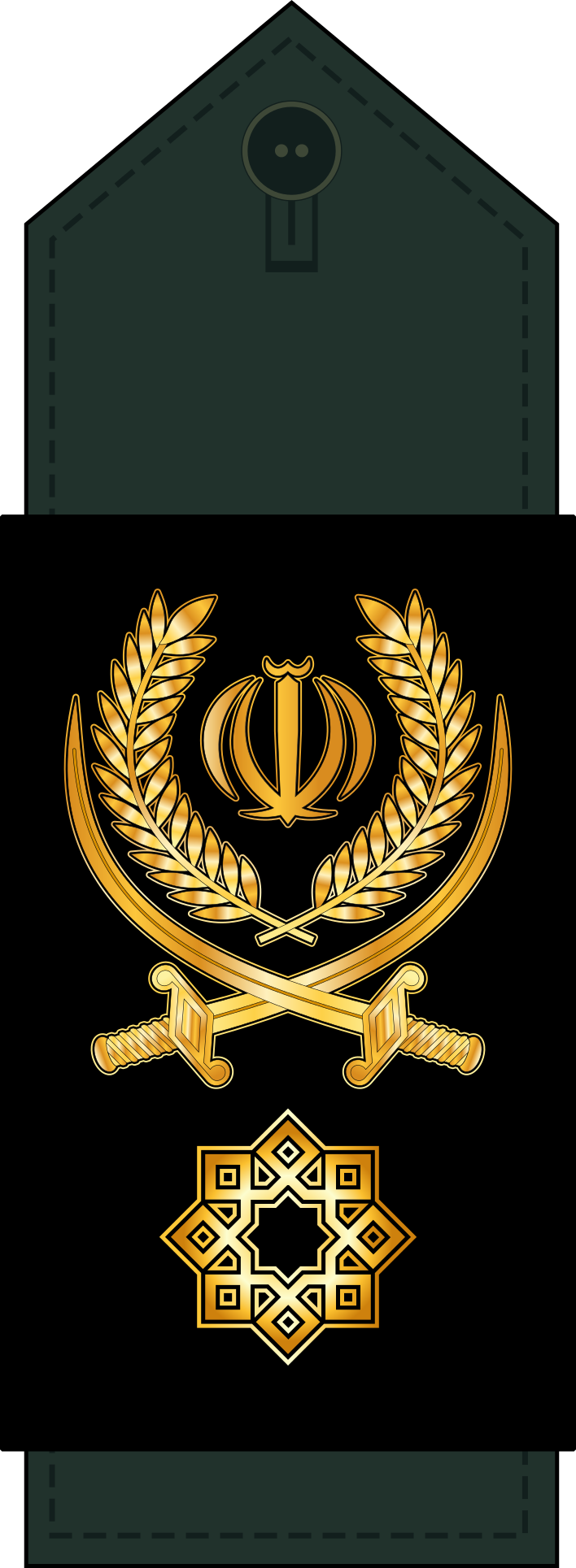
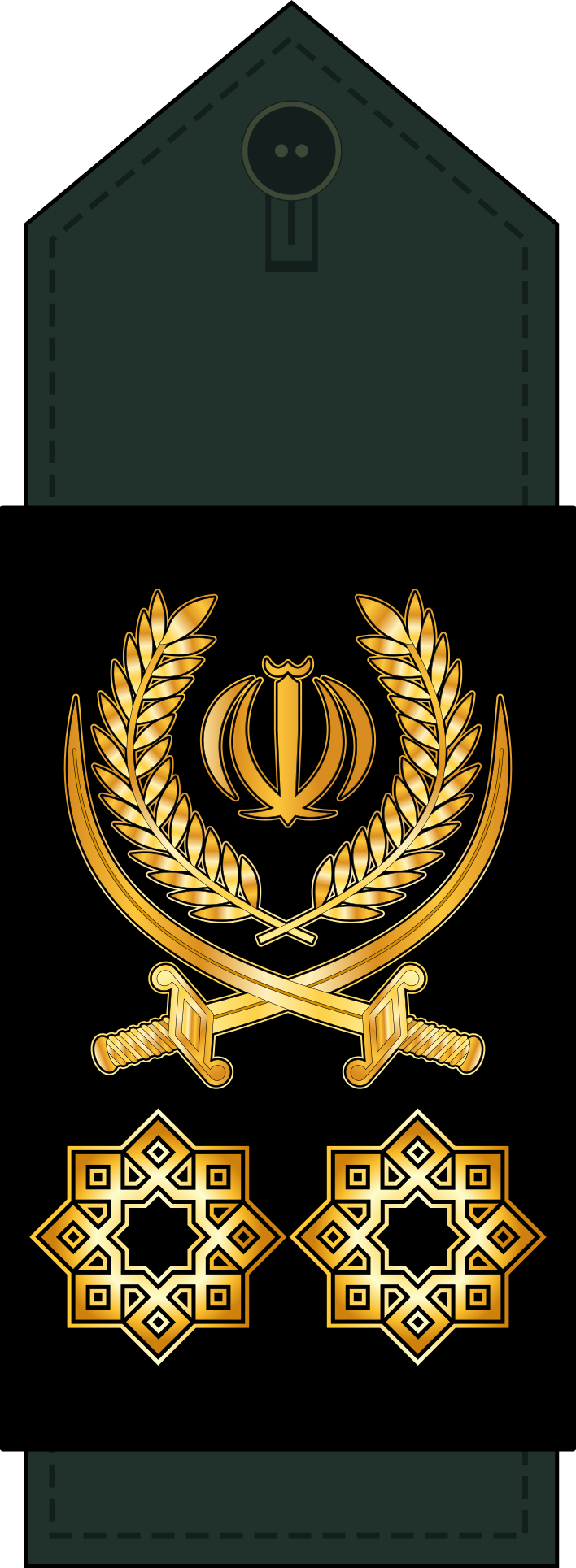
- Rank: Brigadier General; Major General (posthumously)
- Commands: Deputy for Intelligence and Security of the General Staff of the Armed Forces (2025–2026); Deputy for intelligence of the Khatam al-Anbiya Central Headquarters (2018–2025); Deputy for Intelligence of the IRGC Ground Forces (2013–2018)
- Conflicts: 1979 Kurdish rebellion in Iran; Iran–Iraq War (WIA); Insurgency in Sistan and Balochistan; 2006 Lebanon War; Syrian civil war; Iranian intervention in Syria; War in Iraq (2013–2017); Iranian intervention in Iraq; Iran–PJAK conflict; Western Iran clashes; 2024 Iran–Israel conflict; Twelve-Day War; 2026 Iran war X

Mohammad Saleh Asadi (Persian: محمدصالح اسدی; 26 November 1963 – 28 February 2026) was an Iranian military intelligence officer who served as head of the intelligence department at the Khatam al-Anbiya Central Headquarters, Iran's military emergency command, and as a senior intelligence officer in the General Staff of the Armed Forces of the Islamic Republic of Iran.

He was killed on 28 February 2026, during joint Israeli–United States airstrikes on Iran that targeted senior Iranian leadership in Tehran. At the time of his death, Asadi was regarded as the most senior military intelligence official in the Islamic Republic's armed forces. Israeli sources described him as involved in shaping Iran's strategic approach toward Israel and the United States.

== Career ==
Asadi served as the head of intelligence for the Khatam al-Anbiya Central Headquarters, Iran's military emergency command. In this capacity, he was responsible for intelligence operations within the structure, which coordinated responses during national emergencies. He also acted as a senior intelligence officer within the General Staff of the Armed Forces of the Islamic Republic of Iran.

Israeli sources stated that Asadi played a role in shaping Iran's strategic posture toward Israel and the United States. The Israel Defense Forces further stated that he was involved in plans related to regional conflicts, including those targeting Israel.

== Assassination ==
Asadi was killed on 28 February 2026 during joint Israeli–United States airstrikes on Tehran. The strikes targeted an Iranian Defence Council meeting of senior Iranian security officials, resulting in multiple high-profile deaths. The meeting was reportedly intended to reach a final decision on the development of a nuclear weapon. His successors, Abdollah Jalali-Nasab and Amir Shariat, were assassinated by Israel two weeks later.

== See also ==
- List of Iranian officials killed during the 2026 Iran war
- Khatam al-Anbiya Central Headquarters
- General Staff of the Armed Forces of the Islamic Republic of Iran

Military offices
Preceded by Unknown	Intelligence Deputy of the IRGC Ground Forces; 2013–2018	Succeeded by Unknown
Preceded by Unknown	Intelligence Deputy of the Khatam al-Anbiya Central Headquarters; 2018–2025	Succeeded by Unknown
Preceded by Gholamreza Mehrabi	Head of the Intelligence and Security Directorate of the General Staff of the Armed Forces; 2025–2026	Succeeded by Unknown
