= Reza Mozaffari Nia =

Iranian military official (1959–2026)

Sardar Reza Mozaffari Nia
- رضا مظفری‌نیا
- Mozaffari Nia in an undated photo

Deputy Minister of Defense for Education
- In office October 2025 – 28 February 2026
- President: Masoud Pezeshkian
- Supreme Leader: Ali Khamenei
- Preceded by: ?
- Succeeded by: ?

Deputy Minister of Defense and head of the Organization of Defensive Innovation and Research
- In office 2020 – October 2025
- President: Ebrahim Raisi; Mohammad Mokhber (acting); Masoud Pezeshkian
- Supreme Leader: Ali Khamenei
- Preceded by: Mohsen Fakhrizadeh
- Succeeded by: Hossein Jabal Amelian

Deputy Minister of Defense for Industrial and Research Affairs
- In office 2017–2020
- President: Hassan Rouhani
- Supreme Leader: Ali Khamenei

President of Malek-Ashtar University of Technology
- In office 2009–2017
- Preceded by: Mohammad Mehdi-Nezhad Nouri
- Succeeded by: Abotalib Shafaghat

Personal details
- Born: 24 August 1959 Isfahan, Pahlavi Iran
- Died: 28 February 2026 (aged 66) Tehran, Iran
- Cause of death: Airstrike

Military service
- Allegiance: Iran
- Branch/service: Islamic Revolutionary Guard Corps
- Years of service: 1980–2026
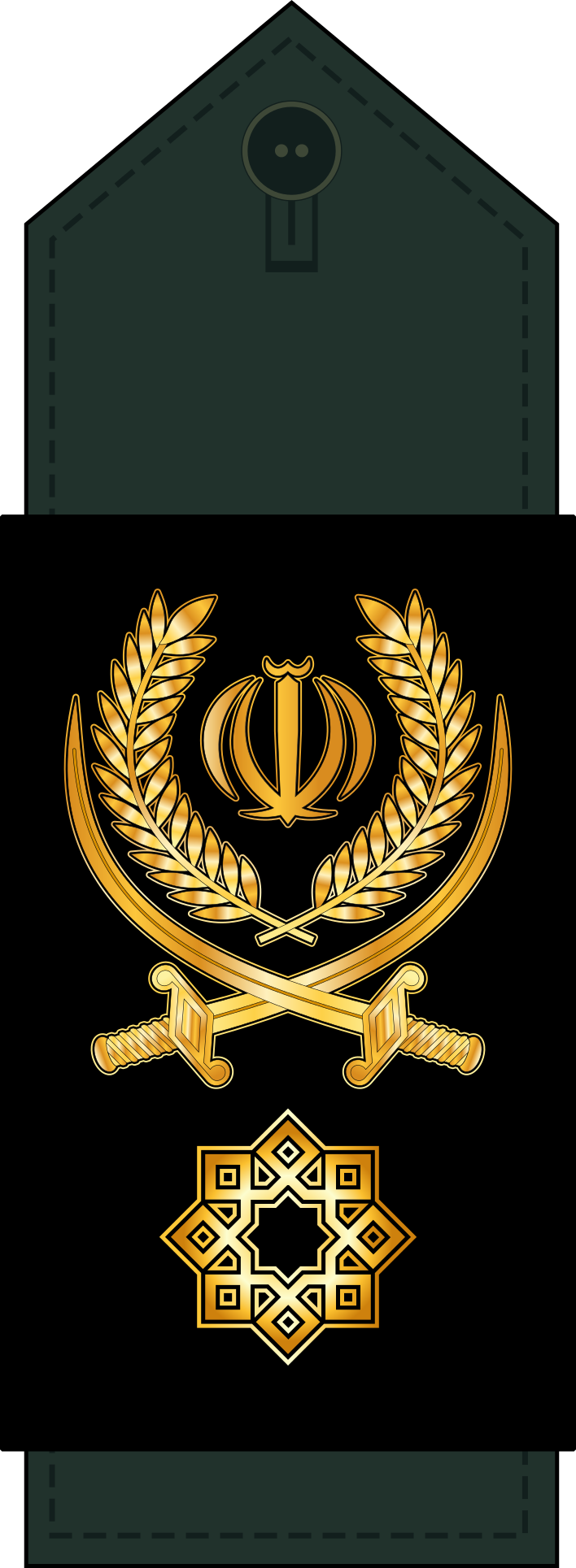
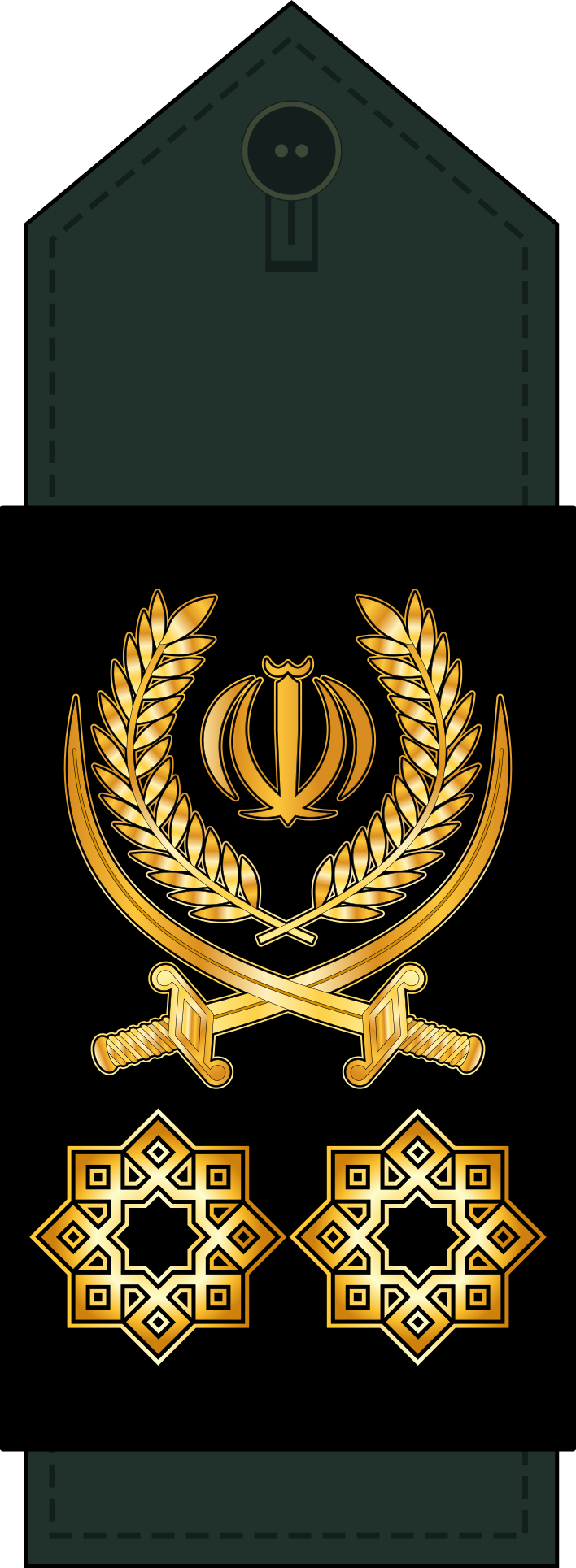
- Rank: Brigadier General; Major General (posthumously)
- Battles/wars: Iran–Iraq War; Twelve-Day War; 2026 Iran war †

Reza Mozaffari Nia (Persian: رضا مظفری‌نیا, also spelled Reza Mozaffarinia or Reza Mozafarnia; 24 August 1959 – 28 February 2026) was an Iranian military official who served as director of the Organization of Defensive Innovation and Research (SPND), an entity within Iran's Ministry of Defence and Armed Forces Logistics (MODAFL) associated with research into sensitive technologies. He previously held positions as deputy defence minister and dean of Malek-Ashtar University of Technology (MUT). Mozaffari-Nia was sanctioned by the United States for his alleged involvement in Iran's missile and weapons of mass destruction programmes. He was killed in the 2026 Israeli–United States strikes on Iran.

== Early life and education ==
Mozaffari Nia was born in 1959 in Isfahan, Iran.

== Career ==
Mozaffari-Nia served as deputy defence minister in Iran's MODAFL and as dean of Malek-Ashtar University of Technology (MUT), a university affiliated with the ministry. In September 2021, he was appointed director of the Organization of Defensive Innovation and Research (SPND), succeeding Mahdi Farahi. The SPND has been described by the United States as the successor to Iran's pre-2004 nuclear weapons programme, involved in developing technologies with potential applications in nuclear, biological, and chemical weapons.

In 2013, the United States Office of Foreign Assets Control (OFAC) designated Mozaffari-Nia under Executive Order 13382 for his role in supporting Iran's missile programme and proliferation of weapons of mass destruction. The U.S. State Department updated his designation in 2025, stating that as SPND director, he oversaw efforts to acquire dual-use equipment and advance sensitive technologies potentially applicable to nuclear weapons.

== Death ==
Mozaffari-Nia was killed on 28 February 2026 during the 2026 Israeli–United States strikes on Iran. The strikes targeted senior Iranian defence and security figures, and Mozaffari-Nia was identified as a former SPND chairman who had contributed to nuclear weapons development efforts, per Israeli military statements.

== See also ==
- Iran and weapons of mass destruction
- Nuclear program of Iran
- List of Iranian officials killed during the 2026 Iran war
