= Disappearance of Robert Levinson =

American disappearance case

Robert Levinson
- Levinson while in captivity, November 2010
- Born: Robert Alan Levinson; March 10, 1948; Flushing, New York, U.S.
- Disappeared: March 9, 2007 (aged 58); Kish Island, Iran
- Status: Missing for 19 years, 5 months and 22 days; declared dead in absentia on March 25, 2020 (aged 72)
- Occupation: Federal agent
- Known for: Disappearance in Iran
- Perpetrators: Iranian Ministry of Intelligence (alleged by the U.S., denied by Iran)
- Accused: Mohammad Baseri; Ahmad Khazai
- Contact: Official website

Robert Alan Levinson (March 10, 1948 – presumed deceased before March 25, 2020) was an American former Drug Enforcement Administration (1970–1976) and Federal Bureau of Investigation (1976–1998) agent who disappeared on March 9, 2007, in Kish Island, Iran, while on a mission for the Central Intelligence Agency (1998–2007). Levinson's family received a $2.5 million annuity from the CIA in order to stop a lawsuit revealing details of his work in Iran and to forestall any revelation of details regarding the arrangement between Levinson and the agency.

He is believed to have been held captive by the Government of Iran, though Iran has not acknowledged his arrest. According to his family, he suffered from type 2 diabetes, gout, and hypertension. His passport has never shown up in any other country.

On March 25, 2020, Levinson's family announced his presumed death on the advisement of the U.S. government, and although the date is unknown, it is assumed that he died while in Iranian custody. On December 14, 2020, two employees of the Iranian Ministry of Intelligence, Mohammad Baseri and Ahmad Khazai, were sanctioned by the U.S. Treasury Department in connection with kidnapping Levinson.

== Disappearance ==
U.S. officials believed Levinson had been arrested by Iranian intelligence officials to be interrogated and used as a bargaining chip in negotiations. However, as leads fizzled out and the Iranian government repeatedly denied any involvement in his disappearance, speculation arose that Levinson was dead. He was last seen alive in photographs from April 2011, wearing an orange jumpsuit and holding signs in broken English, apparently written by his captors, asking for help.

On December 12, 2013, the Associated Press (AP) reported that their investigations revealed that Levinson indeed had been working for the Central Intelligence Agency (CIA), contradicting the U.S. government's statement that he was not an employee of the government at the time of his capture; U.S. officials had publicly insisted that Levinson went to Iran as a private investigator, working a cigarette-smuggling case. The AP had first confirmed Levinson's CIA ties in 2010.

He was on an unauthorized mission to gather intelligence about the Iranian government for the U.S. government. When his case came to light inside the U.S. government, it produced a serious scandal. Levinson's travel was planned by three CIA officials who did not follow the proper vetting process or seek the necessary approval for the mission from their supervisors. Kish Island in the Persian Gulf is a tourist destination, a stronghold of international organized crime, and a free-trade zone, meaning Americans do not need a visa to enter.

In 2008, the CIA forced the CIA officials to turn in early resignations and disciplined seven others after an internal investigation determined they were responsible for sending Levinson on the mission to Iran. Levinson's source on Kish was Dawud Salahuddin, an American fugitive accused of the killing of the prominent former Iranian diplomat Ali Akbar Tabatabaei in 1980. The exiled Tabatabaei was holding meetings of a counter-revolutionary group at his Bethesda, Maryland home at the time.

What Levinson wanted in that mission remains altogether unclear. Levinson had retired from the FBI in 1998 and had become self-employed as a private investigator; his specialty was Russian organized crime gangs, and he was even interviewed numerous times for television documentaries to discuss the topic. Both Levinson and the CIA analyst who hired him, Anne Jablonski, specialized in Russian organized crime and not Iranian issues.

In an interview, Iranian President Hassan Rouhani spoke of cooperation regarding Levinson's case. "We are willing to help, and all the intelligence services in the region can come together to gather information about him to find his whereabouts."

=== Alleged Iranian involvement ===
On January 8, 2013, the Associated Press reported that "the consensus now among some U.S. officials involved in the case is that despite years of denials, Iran's intelligence service was almost certainly behind the 54-second video and five photographs of Levinson that were emailed anonymously to his family. 'The tradecraft used to send those items was too good, indicating professional spies were behind them', the officials said ... While everything dealing with Iran is murky, their conclusion is based on the U.S. government's best intelligence analysis."

== Family investigation ==
Robert Levinson's FBI Missing poster

Media reported in August 2007 that Christine, Levinson's wife, was planning a trip to Iran with their oldest son, Dan. The United States Department of State stressed that there was a travel warning to that country and they would be doing so at their own risk. Iran announced on September 23, 2007, that they would be allowed to visit the country.

In December 2007, Christine and Dan traveled to Iran to attempt to learn more about Levinson's disappearance. They met with Iranian officials in Tehran and traveled to Levinson's hotel in Kish, the Hotel Maryam.

Airport officials allowed Christine and Dan to view the flight manifests for all flights leaving Kish during the time Levinson was due to leave, but his name did not appear on any of the lists provided. They were also able to view Levinson's signature from the hotel check-out bill on March 9. Iranian officials promised to provide an investigative report to the family, but have yet to do so. In July 2008 and subsequent interviews, Christine and Dan said they wanted to travel to Iran again soon.

=== Proof of life ===
According to the Associated Press, Levinson's family received "irrefutable proof" of life late in 2010. On December 9, 2011, the family released a hostage video they received in November 2010. In the video, Levinson appeared to have lost considerable weight, and repeatedly pleaded for help in returning home.

On January 8, 2013, Levinson's family released photos to the media showing the former agent in an orange jumpsuit with overgrown and unkempt hair. A family spokesman told CNN the photographs were received in April 2011. CNN reported: "Asked why the family is releasing the images now, more than 18 months later, the spokesman said: 'The family is anxious that not enough is being done. There is frustration with the lack of progress on the case.'"

== U.S. government investigation ==
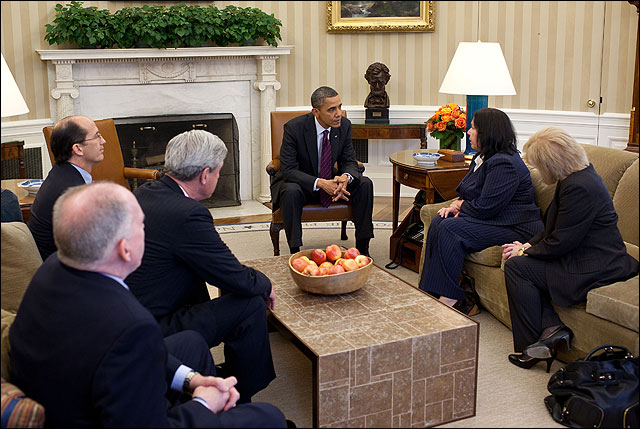
President Barack Obama meets with Christine Levinson in the Oval Office on March 6, 2012

In June 2007, President George W. Bush released a statement on Levinson's case, saying: "I am ... disturbed by the Iranian regime's refusal so far to provide any information on Robert Levinson, despite repeated U.S. requests. I call on Iran's leaders to tell us what they know about his whereabouts."

On January 13, 2009, U.S. Senator Bill Nelson stated during Hillary Clinton's confirmation hearing that he believed Levinson was being held in a secret prison in Iran.

According to The New York Times, Levinson had been meeting with Dawud Salahuddin, (an American convert to Islam wanted for the 1980 murder of an Iranian dissident in the US) "just before he went missing".

On March 8, 2013, the Obama administration released a statement to mark the sixth anniversary of Levinson's disappearance. Press Secretary Jay Carney said:

Finding him remains a high priority for the United States, and we will continue to do all that we can to bring him home safely to his friends and family, so they may begin to heal after so many years of extraordinary grief and uncertainty. The Iranian Government previously offered assistance in locating Mr. Levinson and we look forward to receiving this assistance, even as we disagree on other key issues.

Secretary of State John Kerry also met with Levinson's wife and son "to reiterate that the U.S. government remains committed to locating Mr. Levinson and reuniting him safely with his family".

During the Obama–Rouhani phone call on September 27, 2013, the first communication between the presidents of the two countries in 34 years, President Obama noted his concern about Levinson's disappearance to Rouhani, and expressed his interest in seeing him reunited with his family.

=== 2015 United States Senate resolution ===
On May 11, 2015, the United States Senate voted on a concurrent resolution calling for Levinson's release, which passed in a unanimous decision without amendment. This resolution states that it is U.S. policy that: (1) the government of the Islamic Republic of Iran should immediately release Saeed Abedini, Amir Hekmati, and Jason Rezaian, and cooperate with the U.S. government to locate and return Robert Levinson; and (2) the U.S. government should undertake every effort using every diplomatic tool at its disposal to secure their release.

=== Sanctions ===
On December 14, 2020, the U.S. Treasury Department sanctioned two employees of the Iranian Ministry of Intelligence (MOIS) in connection with the kidnapping. U.S. officials said they had obtained new information about their involvement in Levinson's disappearance but refused to provide further details.

Mohammad Baseri, who was a high-ranking MOIS employee codenamed "Sanai", was allegedly involved in sensitive Iranian national security investigations and was alleged to have worked with foreign intelligence services to harm U.S. interests. Ahmad Khazai, a senior officer of the MOIS, has previously led MOIS delegations to other countries in threat assessment missions. According to the Treasury Department, Baseri and Khazai were involved in the abduction, detention, and probable death of Levinson.

On March 25, 2025, the U.S. Treasury sanctioned three Iranian Ministry of Intelligence and Security (MOIS) officials—Reza Amiri Moghadam, Gholamhossein Mohammadnia, and Taqi Daneshvar—for their roles in the abduction, detention, and probable death of former FBI agent Robert Levinson. Levinson disappeared in 2007 during a CIA mission on Iran’s Kish Island. The sanctions, enacted under Executive Order 14078 (Robert Levinson Hostage Recovery Act), freeze U.S.-linked assets of the individuals and prohibit transactions with them.

The designations follow prior sanctions against MOIS officers Mohammad Baseri and Ahmad Khazai in 2020. Key details:

- Mohammadnia (former Iranian ambassador to Albania) allegedly shifted blame for Levinson’s abduction to Pakistani militants.
- Moghadam (current Iranian ambassador to Pakistan) oversaw MOIS operations in Europe and obscured Tehran’s involvement.
- Daneshvar supervised Baseri, who directly executed Levinson’s abduction.

The Treasury and FBI emphasized ongoing efforts to hold Iran accountable for human rights abuses and hostage-taking. The U.S. State Department’s Rewards for Justice program continues to offer up to $20 million for information about Levinson’s fate. These sanctions underscore U.S. resolve to counter Iran’s "wrongful detention" practices and demand transparency in unresolved cases.

=== Reward ===
A $20 million reward poster to help find Levinson.

On March 6, 2012, approaching the fifth anniversary of Levinson's captivity, the Federal Bureau of Investigation offered a $1-million reward for information leading to his safe recovery and return. In addition, a campaign was launched, using billboards, radio messages, flyers, and a telephone hotline to publicize this reward and obtain information of his whereabouts. In conjunction with this announced reward, the Society of Former Special Agents of the Federal Bureau of Investigation announced that it was giving the two youngest Levinson children $5,000 each to help with their college costs.

On March 9, 2015, the FBI increased the reward to up to $5 million for information regarding Levinson's whereabouts.

On November 4, 2019, the United States Department of State Rewards for Justice Program offered a $20-million reward for information leading to Levinson's whereabouts.

== Statements from Iran ==
=== Mahmoud Ahmadinejad ===
Pressed by Charlie Rose in an interview for CBS This Morning in September 2012, then-Iranian President Mahmoud Ahmadinejad "did not deny Iran still has Levinson in its custody, and hinted that there had been talks about a prisoner exchange". Rose asked, "Is there anything that could happen, a trade or something, that could allow him to come back to the United States?" Ahmadinejad responded:

I remember that last year Iranian and American intelligence groups had a meeting, but I haven't followed up on it. I thought they'd come to some kind of an agreement.

CBS' John Miller said that "tacit admission that he's in their custody and that there have been talks", in and of itself, "is a big step".

In a 2008 interview with NBC's Brian Williams, Ahmadinejad was questioned regarding Levinson's case and its status. He responded:

There was a claim made some time ago, some people came over, the gentleman's family came over. They talked and met with our officials and were given our responses. I see no reason for a person who was given an Iranian visa and — came into Iran, arrived in Iran through official channels, to have problems here. Our security officials and agents have expressed their willingness to assist the FBI, if the FBI has any information about his travels around the world. We have said that we are ready to help, to assist with that matter. There are certain informations that only the FBI at the moment has. I am not an expert in that field, as you might appreciate, so I'm not going to make a judgment here whether that information, as they say, is true and only held by the FBI or other parties for that matter.

=== Hassan Rouhani ===
In an interview with CNN's Christiane Amanpour during her trip to the United Nations General Assembly in September 2013, Iranian President Hassan Rouhani spoke of cooperation regarding Levinson's case. "We are willing to help, and all the intelligence services in the region can come together to gather information about him to find his whereabouts", Rouhani told Amanpour, "and we're willing to cooperate on that".

In a subsequent interview with Charlie Rose, Rouhani said, "As to where his whereabouts when he disappeared, I personally have no information on those details, but naturally when someone disappears their family is suffering in specific. Everyone must help. It's natural that everyone must help".

=== United Nations filing ===
In a filing to the United Nations' Working Group on Enforced or Involuntary Disappearances, Iran's embassy in Geneva, citing Tehran's Justice Department, claimed that Levinson had an "ongoing case in the Public Prosecution and Revolutionary Court of Tehran". The Revolutionary Court of Tehran usually handles cases of espionage, smuggling, blasphemy and attempts to overthrow Iran's government.

== Reported death ==
In March 2020, it was reported that Levinson's family and the United States government had concluded that it was likely that Levinson had died in Iranian custody before 2020.

On October 5, 2020, a US court ordered the Government of Iran to pay more than $1.4 billion in punitive and compensatory damages to Levinson's family. The money that will be paid to Levinson's family will come from Iranian assets that were frozen in 1980 by the US.

== See also ==
- List of people who disappeared mysteriously (2000–present)
