= Ali Mohammad Naini =

Iranian brigadier general (1957–2026)

Sardar Ali Mohammad Naini
- علی محمد نائینی
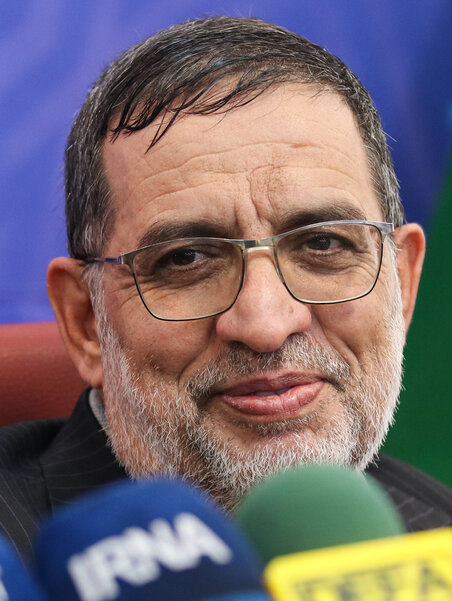
- Naini in 2025
- Born: Ali Mohammad Naini; 19 March 1957; Kashan, Isfahan province, Pahlavi Iran
- Died: 20 March 2026 (aged 69); Tehran, Iran
- Cause of death: Assassination by airstrike
- Education: Supreme National Defense University
- Military career
- Allegiance: Iran
- Branch: IRGC
- Service years: 1978–2026
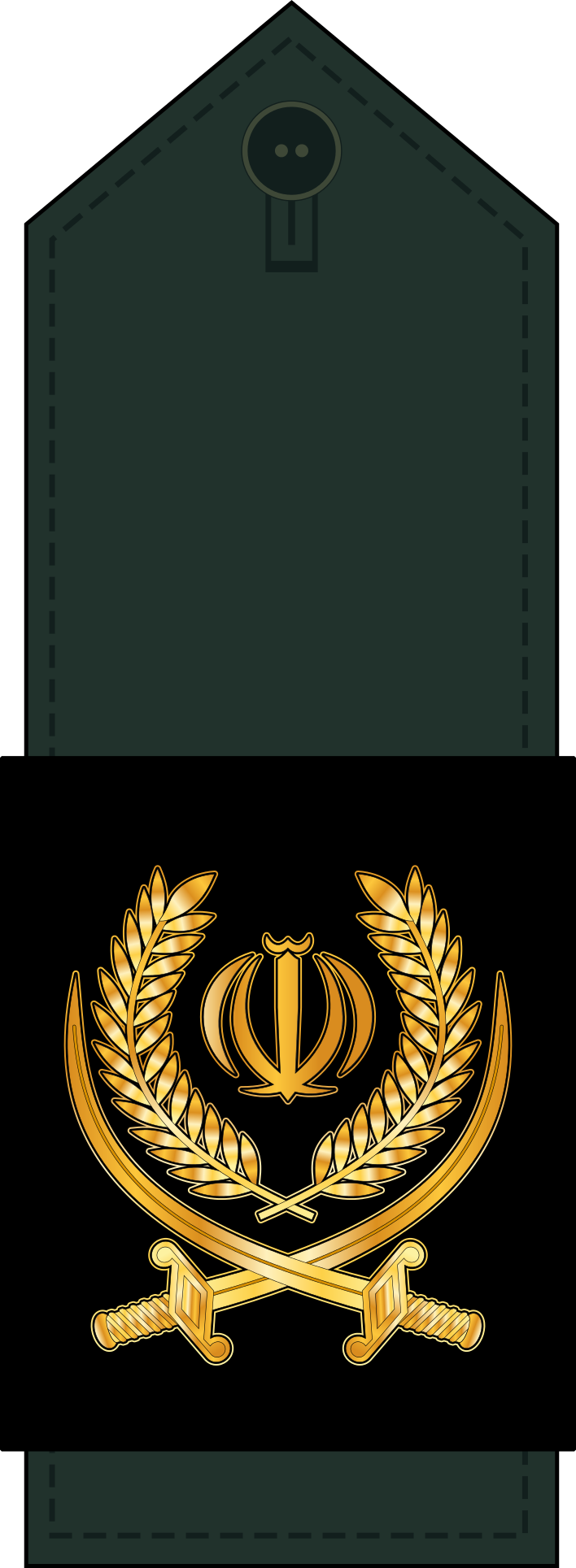
- Rank: Second Brigadier General
- Commands: Spokesperson of the IRGC (2024–2026); Head of the Sacred Defense Documentation and Research Center (2017–2024)
- Conflicts: Iran–Iraq War (WIA); 2024 Iran–Israel conflict; Twelve-Day War; 2026 Iran war X

Ali Mohammad Naini (Persian: علی محمد نائینی; 19 March 1957 – 20 March 2026) was an Iranian military officer who served as the spokesperson of the Islamic Revolutionary Guard Corps (IRGC) from 2024 until his death in 2026.

== Career ==
Naeini was a veteran with four decades of service, including participation in the Iran–Iraq War, and held several senior roles during his career, such as serving as the IRGC’s cultural deputy and the Basij’s cultural and social deputy. He succeeded Brigadier General Ramazan Sharif as the IRGC spokesperson, an appointment made by Commander-in-Chief Major General Hossein Salami.

He was widely regarded as one of the IRGC’s leading experts in psychological warfare, soft power, and cognitive warfare.

Naini was also a professor of social sciences and faculty member at Imam Hossein University. The United Kingdom sanctioned Naini following the October 2024 Iranian missile strikes on Israel.

== Death ==
Naini was assassinated on 20 March 2026 by the Israeli strikes during the 2026 Iran war. His death was officially confirmed by Iranian news media reports.

According to media reports, Abdullah Haji Sadeghi, the representative of the Supreme Leader of Iran in the IRGC, appointed Brigadier General Hossein Mohebbi as the new spokesperson.

== See also ==
- List of Iranian officials killed during the 2026 Iran war

Military offices
Preceded by Ramezan Sharif	Spokesperson of Islamic Revolutionary Guard Corps; 24 July 2024 – 20 March 2026	Succeeded by Hossein Mohebbi
Preceded by Hossein Ardestani	Head of the Sacred Defense Documentation and Research Center; 2017 – 24 July 2024	Succeeded by Ramezan Sharif
