= Air campaign in Iranian Kurdistan =

2026 Iran war bombardment

- Part of the 2026 Iran war and 2026 Kurdish–Iranian crisis
Date	2 March 2026 – present (6 months and 4 weeks)
Location	Iranian Kurdistan (Kermanshah, Kurdistan, West Azerbaijan, Ilam, Lorestan provinces)
Status	Ongoing: At least 180 military bases, including border posts destroyed

Belligerents
Israel; United States	Iran

Units involved
- See order of battle

Casualties and losses
- See casualties

During the 2026 Iran war, around one‑fifth of all airstrikes by the United States and Israel occurred in Iranian Kurdistan (Eastern Kurdistan or Rojhelat), targeting Kurdish provinces in Iran such as Kermanshah, Kurdistan, West Azerbaijan, Ilam, and Lorestan. Most strikes were carried out by Israel, with the Kurdish city of Kermanshah receiving the second-highest number of attacks after Tehran, Iran's capital. Between 2 and 4 March, three days after the war commenced, airstrikes carried out by Israeli and U.S. forces intensified against Iranian military and government targets in Iranian Kurdistan, coinciding with increased media attention and statements by U.S. President Donald Trump regarding discussions with Kurdish opposition parties and Iraqi Kurdish officials about potential cooperation in a possible ground offensive against Iran.

== Objectives of the campaign ==
Iranian Kurdistan is heavily militarized, with roughly 1,800 checkpoints, numerous military installations, and a strong security presence. In 2016, the western provinces with large Kurdish populations were removed from the authority of the interior ministry and placed directly under the command of the IRGC and affiliated Basij militias following clashes with Kurdish militants, further increasing the region's military presence. Many of the military facilities are located near densely populated urban areas.

Airstrikes in Iranian Kurdistan targeted border positions along the Iran–Iraq border, particularly near the Kurdistan Region of Iraq. Other primary targets included IRGC, Basij, and police facilities, border guard commands, intelligence headquarters, and internal security installations throughout the Kurdish provinces. This targeting pattern differed from operations elsewhere in Iran, where strikes largely focused on strategic military infrastructure such as missile facilities, naval bases, nuclear-related sites, and command-and-control centers.

Observers have suggested that the focus on these targets reflected several operational objectives. Strikes on border positions were intended to weaken Iran's control of the Iran–Iraq border against neighbouring Kurdish opposition groups from the Kurdistan Region of Iraq. Attacks on Basij and police facilities sought to degrade the capacity of internal security forces to suppress potential unrest among the local Kurdish population. Strikes on intelligence installations aimed to disrupt surveillance to monitor activists and militant movements in the region. Some reports stated that the strikes may have "paved the way for a Kurdish advance" and reflected a "strategy built around the Kurds."

In this context, operations in these areas carry heightened "political sensitivity."

However, an assessment by The National Context indicated that it remains unclear whether the extensive bombing campaign significantly degraded Iran's border defenses or its capacity to respond to potential Kurdish uprisings. The publication suggested that the Iranian government may have anticipated such a scenario, as it has in the past, by creating mobile units during previous protests, adopting tactical flexibility, dispersing personnel and forming smaller units, duplicating communications equipment, moving archives, and establishing parallel command networks. On the other hand, the report argued that dispersing its forces could leave small, decentralized units more exposed, potentially making them easier targets for Kurdish insurgents. According to Hengaw, Iranian forces had reportedly relocated personnel to schools and mosques before many strikes occurred.

== Airstrikes by region ==
=== Kermanshah Province ===
Locations targeted in the Kermanshah Province included Kermanshah, Paveh, Sarpol-e Zahab, Javanrud, Ravansar, Kerend-e Gharb, Eslamabad-e Gharb, and Qasr-e Shirin.

Notably, strikes in Kermanshah province were concentrated in the northern, predominantly Sunni Kurdish districts of Javanrud, Ravansar, and Paveh, a mountainous border region that has historically served as a center of Kurdish insurgent activity and clashes with Iranian security forces.

=== Kurdistan Province ===
Locations targeted included at least 40 sites in Sanandaj, several of which were bombed multiple times, as well as sites in Baneh, and Saqqez.

Targets included IRGC barracks in various towns and cities, and border positions along the Iran–Iraq border. Eyewitnesses who published videos of strikes on an IRGC barracks in Saqqez reported loud explosions and heavy fire following the bombardment. An analyst described the strikes on border guard and police bases in Marivan and Piranshahr as significant, noting that these posts protect key "entry points" for Kurdish opposition groups.

Sanandaj contains several categories of security installations that form the core of the Iranian state's presence in Kurdistan Province. Several of these security installations were targeted including, the Intelligence Department Complex, the Shahramfar IRGC Headquarters, the Takyeh va Chaman Police Facility, the Baharan Police Facilities, and the Imam Ali IRGC Garrison.

=== West Azerbaijan Province ===
Most attacks were focused on Bukan, Mahabad, Oshnavieh, and Urmia county. Targets included, among others, the Bukan's district governor's office.

=== Ilam Province ===
Locations targeted included, Ilam, Sarabbagh, Badreh, Mehran, Darreshahr, Dehloran, Lumar, Dalghashah, Esmanabad, Shavar and several nearby villages.

Targets included IRGC and Basij headquarters, such as the Urban Basij compound in Ilam city, an investigation and intelligence facility, and the base of the Imam Hussein Battalion.

=== Lorestan Province ===
Locations targeted included Khorramabad, Borujerd, Nurabad, Kuhdasht, Aleshtar, and Rumeshkan.

== Casualties ==
According to the Hengaw, after Tehran Province the highest number of reported Iranian military casualties from the war occurred in the Kurdish provinces of Kermanshah, Kurdistan, and West Azerbaijan. On 4 March, Hengaw reported that in these provinces, including Ilam, 109 military bases and security facilities had been targeted, and approximately 400 Iranian military personnel had been killed over the preceding three days. On 10 March, Hengaw reported that 180 military bases and security facilities had been targeted and that approximately 900 Iranian military personnel had been killed in the four Kurdish provinces since the start of the war. On 2 April, Hengaw reported "heavy military casualties in Kurdistan" and alleged continued concealment of official statistics, claiming that approximately 1,600 Iranian military personnel had been killed in the Kurdish provinces.

On 6 March, Euractiv described casualties among Iranian forces in Iranian Kurdistan as "large scale."

== See also ==
- 2026 Iranian strikes on the Kurdistan Region
