= Akbar Ebrahimzadeh =

Iranian commander (1953–2026)

Sardar Akbar Ebrahimzadeh
- اکبر ابراهیم‌زاده
- Born: 15 November 1953; Mashhad
- Died: 28 February 2026 (aged 72); Tehran, Iran
- Cause of death: Assassination by Airstrike
- Military career
- Allegiance: Iran
- Branch: Islamic Revolutionary Guard Corps
- Service years: 1979–2026
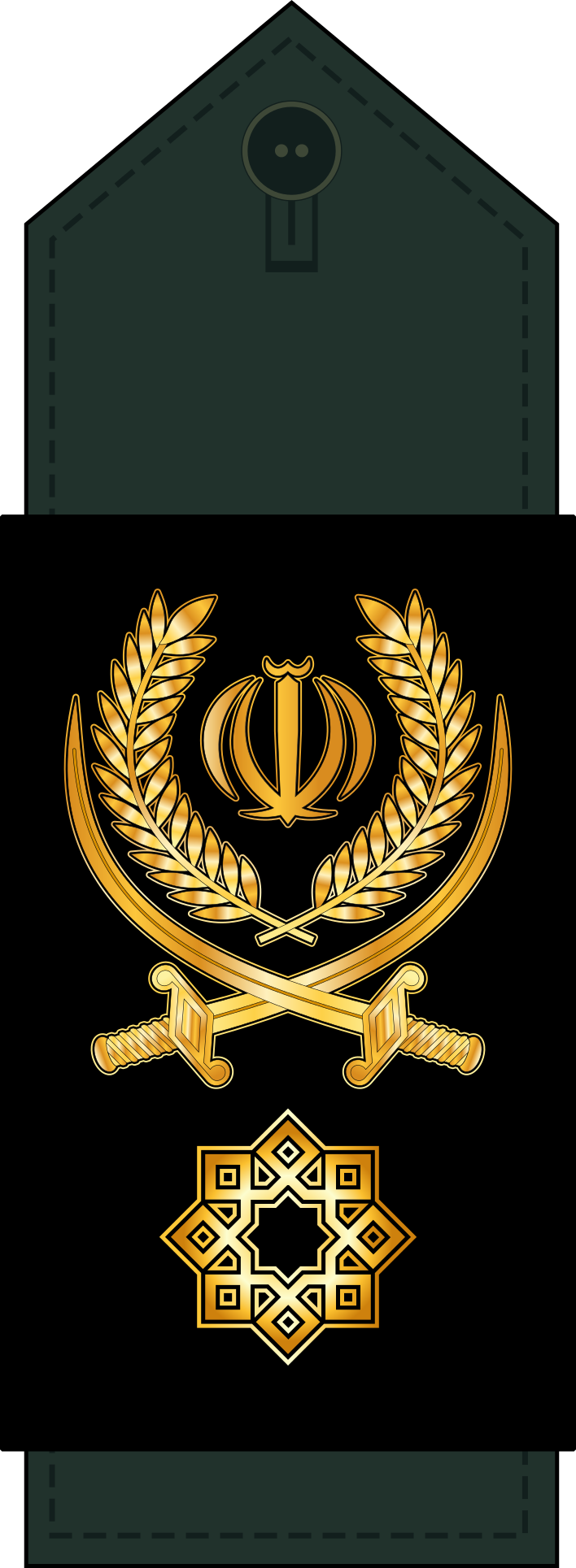
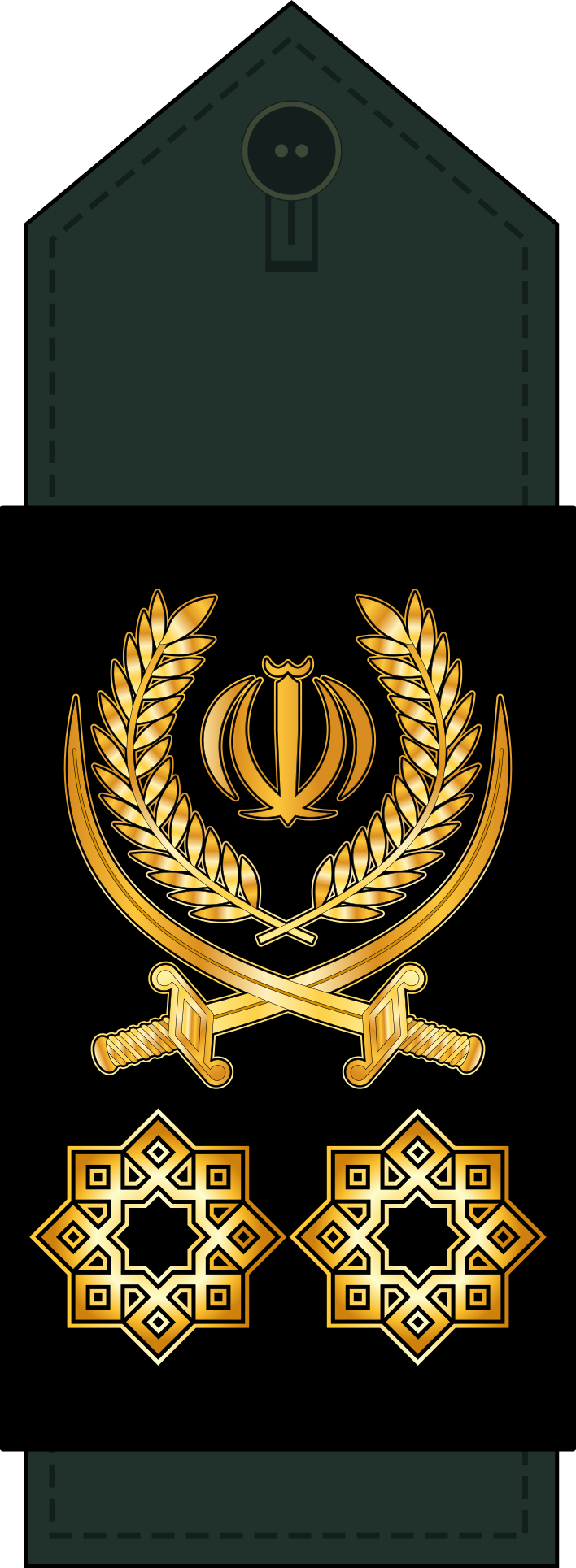
- Rank: Brigadier General; Major General (posthumously)
- Commands: Deputy to the Office of the Commander-in-Chief
- Conflicts: Iran–Iraq War; Twelve-Day War; 2026 Iran war X

Akbar Ebrahimzadeh (November 15, 1953 – February 28, 2026) was a senior commander in the Armed Forces of the Islamic Republic of Iran who held various responsibilities within the General Staff of the Armed Forces. He is listed as the "Deputy Chief of the General Staff of the Armed Forces for Basij Affairs" starting in 2010, and in subsequent years, he was appointed Deputy to the Office of the Commander-in-Chief.

== Career ==
Akbar Ebrahimzadeh held various responsibilities within the IRGC in Khorasan Province. He was considered a veteran of the Khorasan-e Razavi IRGC from 1984 until the end of the Iraq war , he served as the Chief of Staff for the 5th Nasr Division.

== Assassination ==
Akbar Ebrahimzadeh was killed during the conflict involving Iran, the United States, and Israel in March 2026.

== See also ==
- Office of the Supreme Leader of Iran
- 2026 Iran war
- List of Iranian officials killed during the 2026 Iran war
