= Islamic Republic of Iran Police Intelligence Organization =

- سازمان اطلاعات فرماندهی انتظامی جمهوری اسلامی ایران (Persian)
- Official logo
- Active: 2022–present
- Country: Iran
- Agency: Police Command of the Islamic Republic of Iran
- Type: Organization
- Role: Military intelligence; Internal security
- Headquarters: Soroush Street, Tehran, Iran
- Common name: Police Intelligence

Structure
- Employees: Classified information

Commanders
- Current commander: Brigadier general Hamid Alinaghiyanpour

Islamic Republic of Iran Police Intelligence Organization (Persian: سازمان اطلاعات فرماندهی انتظامی جمهوری اسلامی ایران) is an intelligence organization under the supervision of Police Command of the Islamic Republic of Iran, which was formed in 2022 by changing the organizational structure of the Police Command.

This organization is responsible for carrying out the functions of the second pillar of the Police Command. Its responsibilities include providing comprehensive intelligence support to the Police Command in all relevant areas; maintaining the necessary operational readiness to carry out any assigned mission; developing and adapting its organizational structure to meet the requirements of changing circumstances and operational environments; recruiting and training qualified personnel; and establishing effective intelligence coverage in border areas. The organization is also responsible for conducting relevant research and preparing, compiling, and maintaining specialized documents and reference materials related to the country.

== Directors ==
- Mohammad Babaei (15 May 2022 – 29 January 2023)
- Gholamreza Rezaian (29 January 2023 – 28 February 2026)
