= Mohammad Shirazi (general) =

Iranian military officer (1956–2026)

Sardar Mohammad Shirazi
- محمد شیرازی
- Shirazi in 2019
- Born: 21 January 1956; Rafsanjan, Pahlavi Iran
- Died: 28 February 2026 (aged 70); Tehran, Iran
- Cause of death: Assassination by Airstrike
- Military career
- Allegiance: Iran
- Branch: Islamic Revolutionary Guard Corps
- Service years: 1979–2026
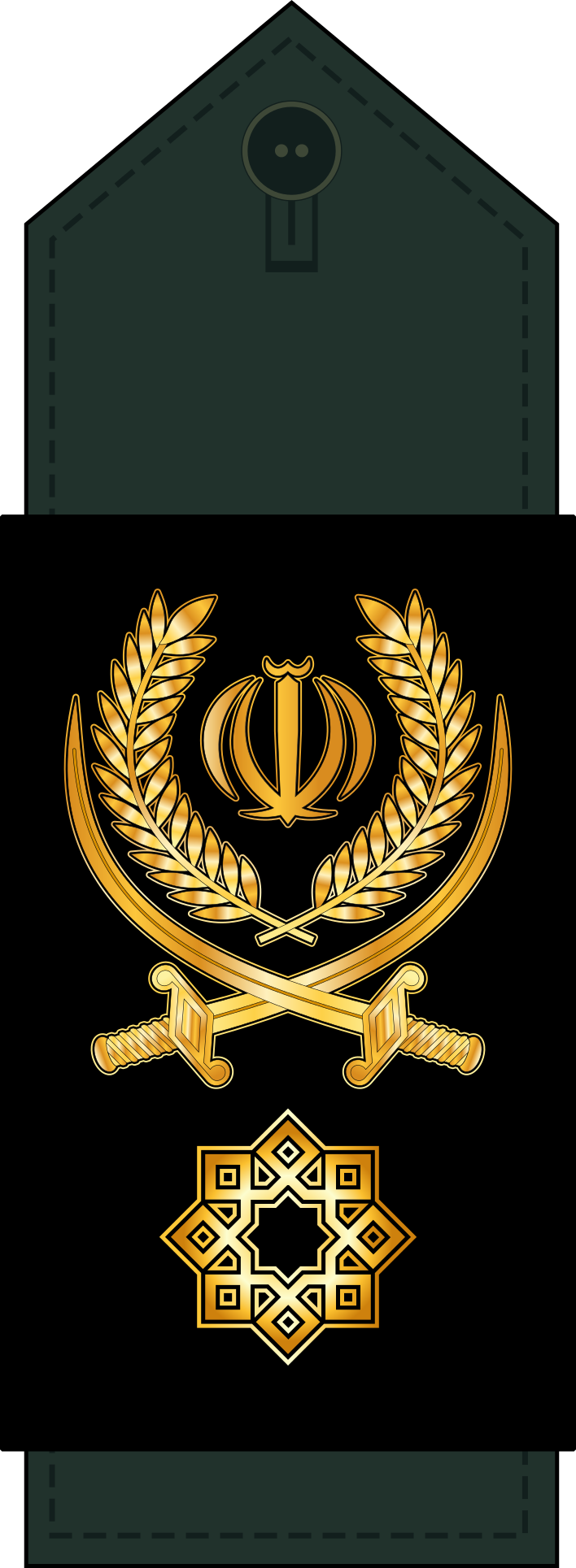
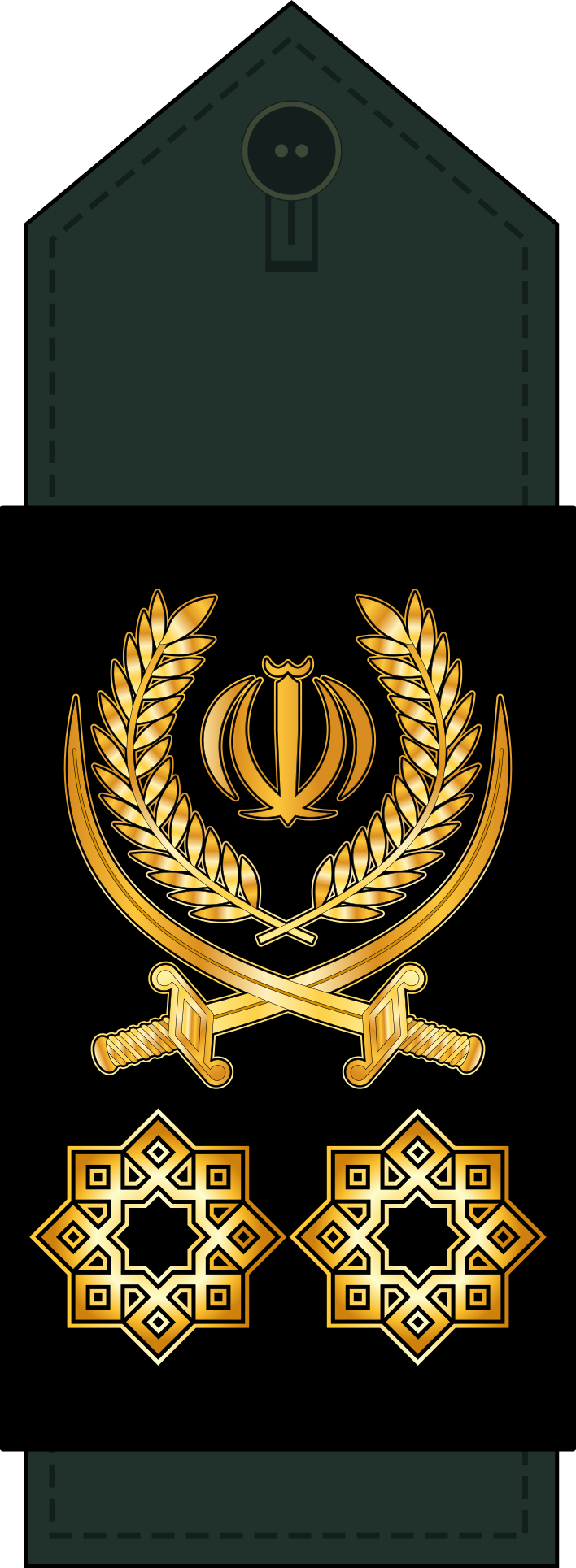
- Rank: Brigadier General; Major General (posthumously)
- Commands: Head of the Military Office of the Supreme Leader of Iran (1989–2026)
- Conflicts: Iran–Iraq War; Twelve-Day War; 2026 Iran war X

Mohammad Shirazi (Persian: محمد شیرازی; 21 January 1956 – 28 February 2026) was an Iranian military general who served as the head of the Military Office of the Supreme Leader of Iran from 1989 until his death in 2026. As a brigadier general, he was responsible for coordinating relations between senior commanders of Iran's armed forces and the supreme leader, acting as a key liaison in the country's defense and security apparatus. Shirazi was killed during the opening strikes of the 2026 Iran war.

== Career ==
Shirazi held the position of head of the Military Office within the Office of the Supreme Leader of Iran starting in 1989. In this role, he facilitated communication and coordination between the top echelons of Iran's military, including the Islamic Revolutionary Guard Corps and the regular armed forces, and Supreme Leader Ali Khamenei. Analysts described him as a central figure in Iran's security decision-making process. Shirazi as a shadowy "gatekeeper" who played a central role in maintaining the Supreme Leader's absolute grip on power. As the primary liaison between the military and the Supreme Leader, he was frequently accused of bypassing traditional government oversight to execute hardline security policies that suppressed domestic dissent. Outside of this article's scope, opposition figures have pointed to his influence in the selection of radical military commanders and his involvement in the strategic planning of proxy conflicts across the Middle East, which led to international sanctions and increased regional instability. Furthermore, his office was often criticized for its lack of transparency, acting as a "black box" where critical national security decisions were made without public accountability or legislative review.

== Assassination ==
Shirazi was killed on 28 February 2026, during coordinated airstrikes by the United States and Israel on Iranian leadership targets in Tehran. The strikes targeted a gathering of senior Iranian officials, including Supreme Leader Ali Khamenei. His death was part of a broader operation that eliminated approximately 40 high-ranking Iranian figures, contributing to a leadership crisis in the country. His successor, Abolqasem Babaeian, who also was the chief of staff at the Khatam al-Anbiya Central Headquarters, was assassinated by Israel 8 days later.

== See also ==
- Office of the Supreme Leader of Iran
- 2026 Iran war
- List of Iranian officials killed during the 2026 Iran war
