= Iranian Defence Council =

Iranian governmental body (1989–present)

Defence Council شورای دفاع

Leadership
- Chairman: President of Iran, Masoud Pezeshkian since 3 August 2025
- Secretary: Ali Akbar Ahmadian
- Seats: 10

Meeting place
- Tehran, Iran

The Defence Council (SNSC; Persian: شورای دفاع, romanized: Showrā-ye Āliye-ye Defāʿ; also known as the Defence Council for War and Defence Affairs) is the defence council of the Islamic Republic of Iran.

The council was established following the Twelve-Day War with Israel in June 2025, in response to hostilities and damage to defence and nuclear facilities, with the aim of centralising and strengthening defence-related projects. Formally founded on 3 August 2025 as a sub-council of the Supreme National Security Council, it is tasked with safeguarding the Islamic Revolution and Iran's territorial integrity against defence-related threats.

In April 2026, Ali Akbar Ahmadian was reported to be serving as secretary of the council following the death of Ali Shamkhani during the 2026 Iran war.

== History ==
During the Iran–Iraq War, an institution known as the High Defence Council was active and played a role in the early years of the conflict, although its effectiveness was limited in comparison with the Supreme National Security Council. The council gradually fell into disuse following the end of the war and was formally dissolved as part of the 1989 constitutional revision.

Following the Twelve-Day War, which involved severe and unexpected attacks on Iran's military, nuclear, and defence facilities, including the killing of numerous military commanders and scientists, confidence in the existing security leadership was significantly affected. These developments prompted the government to undertake a more comprehensive review of the country's security governance structure.

In 2026, Ali Shamkhani, the secretary of the Iranian Defence Council, had been killed in US and Israel strikes on Iran. The secretary is appointed by the President of Iran; the most recent appointment was made by President Masoud Pezeshkian. Two members of the council, Ali Shamkhani and Ali Akbar Ahmadian, were appointed by the Supreme Leader on 7 August 2025.

== Purposes ==
According to an official announcement by the Secretariat of the Supreme National Security Council of Iran on 3 August 2025, the establishment of the Defence Council was approved pursuant to Article 176 of the Constitution of Iran.

The responsibilities of the council are defined by the Constitution of Iran as follows:

1. Determining defence and national security policies within the framework of the general policies set by the Supreme Leader.
2. Coordinating political, intelligence, social, cultural, and economic activities related to defence and national security policies.
3. Mobilising the country's material and intellectual resources to address internal and external threats.

The President of Iran, Masoud Pezeshkian, serves as the head of the council. Its membership includes the heads of the armed forces, senior military commanders, two representatives of the Supreme Leader within the Supreme National Security Council, the Minister of Intelligence, and representatives from relevant ministries, including the Ministry of Defence and the Ministry of Foreign Affairs.

The formation of the Defence Council, as provided for under the law establishing the Supreme National Security Council (Article 176 of the Constitution), was undertaken approximately 36 years after the constitutional revision. The stated purposes of the council include:

- Supporting the comprehensive strengthening of the country's defence capabilities.
- Enhancing coordination and synergy among military and security institutions to improve defence preparedness.
- Accelerating decision-making related to national defence matters.
- Promoting coordination between military and political institutions in response to existing and emerging threats.
- Centralising the management of defence planning.
- Improving preparedness for managing new and evolving threats.

These measures are intended to ensure greater coherence in defence-related decision-making under the supervision of the Commander-in-Chief, particularly in the event of future conflicts.

== Reactions ==
Media outlets aligned with the Iranian government, including Fars and Tasnim, have described the formation of the Defence Council as part of a broader reorganisation of defence governance. These outlets have stated that the council's objectives include accelerating decision-making in response to security threats and centralising command structures.

Some analysts have expressed critical views. Murad Vaisi argued that the establishment of the Defence Council was intended not to defend the population or the country, but to protect the political system and prevent its destabilisation. He characterised the council as a response to a perceived decline in the leadership's confidence in military commanders following the surprise attacks.
