= 2026 in Iran =

- Decades: 2000s; 2010s; 2020s
- See also: Other events of 2026; Years in Iran

Events in the year 2026 in Iran.

== Incumbents ==
- Supreme Leader of Iran:
  - Ali Khamenei (until February 28)
  - Mojtaba Khamenei (since March 8)
- President of Iran: Masoud Pezeshkian
- Speaker of the Parliament: Mohammad Bagher Ghalibaf
- Chief Justice: Gholam-Hossein Mohseni-Eje'i

== Events ==
=== Ongoing ===
- Iranian economic crisis
- 2025–2026 Iranian protests
- 2026 Iran war

=== January ===
- 1 January — At least three people are killed during protests in Azna, Lorestan.
- 8 January — Internet censorship: NetBlocks reports a total internet outage in Tehran and other cities amid ongoing protests.
- 15 January —
  - The Civil Aviation Organization imposes a four-hour shutdown of Iranian airspace.
  - The United States imposes sanctions on Supreme National Security Council secretary Ali Larijani and four other security officials for the role in suppressing the 2025–2026 Iranian protests.
- 23 January — The United States imposes sanctions on nine vessels believed to be part of the Iranian "shadow fleet" used to circumvent the embargo on Iranian oil exports.
- 29 January —
  - New sanctions against Iran are approved by the European Union over its crackdown of the 2025–2026 Iranian protests and providing support for Russia.
  - The Islamic Revolutionary Guard Corps is designated by the European Union as a terrorist organisation.
- 31 January —
  - Four people are killed in a gas explosion at a residential building in Ahvaz.
  - Two people are killed in a gas explosion at a building in Bandar Abbas.
  - Screenwriter Mehdi Mahmoudian is arrested in Tehran. He is released on 17 February.

=== February ===
- 1 February — Iran designates European militaries as "terrorist groups" in response to the previous designation on the IRGC.
- 2 February –
  - President Pezeshkian orders the resumption of negotiations with the United States over the nuclear program of Iran.
  - Interior minister Eskandar Momeni and nine other officials are sanctioned by the United Kingdom for their role in crackdown of the 2025–2026 Iranian protests.
  - Ukraine designates the IRGC as a terrorist organization for its role in crackdown of the 2025–2026 Iranian protests and support for Russia in the Russo-Ukrainian war.
- 3 February –
  - The US Central Command says that the US-flagged tanker M/V Stena Imperative is subjected to an attempted seizure by Iranian forces in the Strait of Hormuz that is repelled by US naval forces.
  - An Iranian Shahed 139 drone is shot down by US forces in the Arabian Sea. Iranian media says that the drone had been completing a surveillance mission in international waters.
- 4 February – Women are officially permitted to ride motorcycles in Iran.
- 5 February – The IRGC seizes two foreign-flagged oil tankers near Farsi Island in the Persian Gulf.
- 6 February – Indirect negotiations between Iran and the United States regarding the nuclear program of Iran are held in Oman.
- 7 February –
  - An executive order threatening a 25% tariff on states doing business with Iran is signed by US President Donald Trump.
  - Nobel Peace Prize laureate Narges Mohammadi is sentenced to 7.5 years' imprisonment and two years of internal exile to Khosf, South Khorasan on charges of "gathering and collusion to commit crimes" and propaganda activities.
- 8–9 February – Four reformist politicians, including Azar Mansouri, Ebrahim Asgharzadeh and Mohsen Aminzadeh, are arrested on charges of attempting to “disrupt the country’s political and social order” and working on behalf of Israel and the United States during the 2025–2026 Iranian protests.
- 11 February – President Pezeshkian apologizes to the nation for the crackdown of the 2025–2026 Iranian protests.
- 17 February – Iran temporarily closes the Strait of Hormuz to conduct live fire exercises.
- 19 February –
  - A British couple detained in Iran since January 2025 are sentenced to 10 years' imprisonment on charges of spying.
  - An aircraft of the Islamic Republic of Iran Air Force crashes during a training flight in Hamadan province, killing one of the two pilots on board.
- 24 February – A Panha 2091 helicopter of the Islamic Republic of Iran Army Aviation crashes into a market in Dorcheh, Isfahan, killing the two crew members on board and two people on the ground.
- 28 February – The 2026 Iran war begins:
  - The United States and Israel launch a major attack on Iran with the stated goal of regime change. Among locations targeted is Tehran, where strikes are carried out on regime targets, including the supreme leader's office. At least 85 elementary school children are killed in an airstrike in Minab.
  - A sports hall and adjacent elementary school in Lamerd, Fars province is hit by a untested short-range Precision Strike Missile, killing at least 21 people, including 4 children.
  - Iran launches missiles at Bahrain, Jordan, Kuwait, Saudi Arabia, and the United Arab Emirates, killing a person in Abu Dhabi.
  - The IRGC Navy announces the closure of the Strait of Hormuz to all vessels.

=== March ===
- 1 March –
  - Iran confirms the death of its supreme leader Ali Khamenei in a decapitation strike the previous day in Tehran by Israel and the United States. Forty days of mourning are declared. Key Iranian officials Abdolrahim Mousavi, Aziz Nasirzadeh, Mohammad Pakpour and Ali Shamkhani are also confirmed killed after an airstrike during a meeting in Tehran.
  - Iran launches two ballistic missiles towards Cyprus, not far from the British military bases on the island. Both are intercepted before reaching Cyprus.
  - Iran appoints Ayatollah Alireza Arafi to an interim leadership council that assumes authority following the assassination of supreme leader Ali Khamenei, with the body set to govern alongside president Masoud Pezeshkian and chief justice Gholam-Hossein Mohseni-Eje'i until the Assembly of Experts selects a new supreme leader.
  - Three U.S. service members are killed and five others are seriously wounded in an Iranian missile strike, according to the United States Central Command.
  - Multiple Iranian Shahed drones strike the French naval air station at Camp de la Paix in Abu Dhabi, United Arab Emirates.
  - The Islamic Republic of Iran Navy's lead Moudge-class frigate, IRIS Jamaran is sunk by U.S forces off Chabahar Port.
- 2 March –
  - Iran launches a missile and drone attack on the Saudi Aramco oil refinery in Ras Tanura, Saudi Arabia, causing several large fires at the facility, and forcing its closure by Saudi authorities.
  - Qatari-state owned QatarEnergy halts all LNG production at its Ras Laffan Industrial City following an Iranian drone attack.
  - The U.S. military says it has struck the IRGC Navy drone carrier IRIS Shahid Bagheri.
  - Iranian semi-official news agency Mehr News Agency reports that Golestan Palace, a former royal residence and UNESCO World Heritage Site is damaged by an airstrike.
- 3 March –
  - An Iranian drone strike damages Al Minhad Air Base, the headquarters of the Australian Defence Force's Joint Task Force 633. Australian defence minister Richard Marles confirms that there were no casualties in the strike.
  - A large fire is reported at an oil terminal in Fujairah, United Arab Emirates, following an Iranian Shahed drone attack.
  - The Iranian Red Crescent Society says the death toll from Israeli and American airstrikes in Iran has risen to 787 with thousands more wounded.
  - The Israeli Air Force carries out airstrikes on the Presidential Administration of Iran and Supreme National Security Council buildings in Tehran.
  - The International Atomic Energy Agency (IAEA) confirms the entrances to the underground Natanz Nuclear Facility in Iran have been bombed. However, there are no signs of any increase in radiation at the facility.
  - Airstrikes hit the Assembly of Experts in Qom. The building appears to have been severely damaged in the attack.
- 4 March –
  - A US Navy submarine sinks the Iranian naval frigate IRIS Dena about 40 kilometres (25 mi) off the southern coast of Sri Lanka, leaving more than 100 of its 180 crew members unaccounted for. Dena becomes the first ship sunk by a US submarine in active combat since World War II.
  - An Iranian ballistic missile hits the Al Udeid Air Base in Qatar, the largest US military base in the region.
  - An Israeli F-35 shoots down an Iranian Yak-130 fighter jet over Tehran with an air-to-air missile.
  - Turkey and NATO forces shoot down an Iranian ballistic missile that was about to enter the country's airspace.
  - Thousands of Coalition of Political Forces of Iranian Kurdistan fighters launch a ground offensive into Iran from Iraq with heavy fighting underway. Iranian forces reportedly withdraw from the city of Marivan.
- 5 March –
  - Iranian Shahed drones strike Nakhchivan International Airport in Azerbaijan, targeting the passenger terminal. At least two people are injured.
  - U.S. president Donald Trump says U.S. Air Force jets will provide "extensive air cover" for Kurdish forces in any ground offensive against the Iranian government.
  - The Lebanese government prohibits activities by members of the IRGC within Lebanon and instructs authorities to detain and deport individuals linked to the group. It also introduces a visa requirement for Iranian nationals entering the country.
- 6 March –
  - The Sri Lanka Navy interns the Iranian Navy replenishment ship IRIS Bushehr and its 208 crew members after the vessel requests assistance following the sinking of IRIS Dena.
  - United States president Donald Trump calls for the "unconditional surrender" of Iran, saying there will be no deal or further talks. This comes after president Pezeshkian says that several countries have initiated mediation efforts to end the war.
  - An Iranian ballistic missile strikes Prince Sultan Air Base in Riyadh Province, Saudi Arabia.
  - An Israeli IAI Heron drone is shot down over Khuzestan province.
- 7 March – President Pezeshkian apologizes for strikes on neighboring countries, attributing them to "miscommunication in the ranks", and says those countries would no longer be targeted unless attacks are launched from them. He also rejects Trump’s demand for Iran's "unconditional surrender".
- 8 March –
  - The main building of the Public Institution for Social Security (PIFSS) in Kuwait City suffers an Iranian air strike. A large fire breaks out, but no injuries are reported.
  - Joint airstrikes by Israel and the United States are carried out against oil facilities in Tehran and others Iranian cities, killing at least four truck drivers and causing large fires.
- 9 March –
  - Mojtaba Khamenei is elected as the next supreme leader.
  - Turkey and NATO forces shoot down an Iranian ballistic missile violating Turkish airspace, with debris falling in Gaziantep Province.
  - The border crossings between Iran and Azerbaijan reopen following the drone incident on 5 March.
- 10 March –
  - Australia grants humanitarian visas to five members of the Iran women's national football team competing in the 2026 AFC Women's Asian Cup amid fears for their safety during the war in Iran and their refusal to sing the Iranian national anthem during a match against South Korea.
  - According to Iran International, American and Israeli airstrikes kill many IRGC commanders and generals, including Basij chief Asadollah Badfar.
  - Dutch foreign minister Tom Berendsen announces the temporary relocation of staff and operations of the Netherlands' embassy in Tehran to Baku, Azerbaijan, citing security risks to personnel amid the Iranian war.
- 11 March –
  - Four people are injured in the UAE after two Iranian drones fall near Dubai International Airport.
  - President Pezeshkian lists preconditions for ending the war between Iran, Israel, and the United States. The conditions include recognizing Iran's legitimate rights, payment of reparations, and firm international guarantees against future aggression.
  - The Thailand-flagged bulk carrier MV Mayuree Naree is hit by two missiles, supposedly Iranian, shortly after passing the Strait of Hormuz. The vessel sets on fire and its crew abandons it; 20 people are rescued and three are reported missing.
- 12 March –
  - Supreme leader Mojtaba Khamenei issues his first public message since his election in which he says that Iran should continue blocking the Strait of Hormuz and advises neighboring countries to close US military bases in their territory. Khamenei also vows to 'avenge the blood of our martyrs'.
  - An Iranian strike hits fuel storage tanks at a facility in Muharraq Governorate, Bahrain.
  - The Kuwait International Airport is targeted by several Iranian drones, causing material damage but no injuries.
  - The Saudi Ministry of Defense announces the interception of two Iranian missiles and the destruction of seven drones.
  - The Government of Thailand summons Iran's ambassador, demanding an apology and an explanation for the attack on the bulk carrier MV Mayuree Naree in the waters of the Strait the previous day.
- 13 March –
  - Sri Lanka repatriates the remains of 84 Iranian sailors killed in the sinking of IRIS Dena on 4 March.
  - Turkey intercepts an Iranian ballistic missile violating its airspace.
- 14 March –
  - Fifteen people are killed in a reported Israeli and United States missile strike on an HVAC factory in Isfahan.
  - Palestinian militant group Hamas calls for Iran to cease their attacks on Middle Eastern neighbors during the war. They also reaffirm Tehran’s right to defend itself from Israel and the United States.
  - United States president Donald Trump calls on the country's allies to help lift the Iranian blockade of the Strait of Hormuz.
- 15 March – Four members of the Iranian women's football team who had earlier been granted asylum by the Australian government change their minds and decide to return to Iran due to concerns that their families would be targeted for retribution by the Iranian authorities.
- 16 March –
  - Iran launches drone attacks on the United Arab Emirates, killing a Palestinian man in Abu Dhabi and forcing the temporary closure of Dubai International Airport.
  - The Israeli Air Force carries out airstrikes on the Iranian Space Research Center in Tehran, saying that it was being used for potential space warfare activities against Israeli satellites.
- 17 March – Israel assassinates Ali Larijani, Secretary of the Supreme National Security Council and Basij commander Gholamreza Soleimani, following airstrikes on Tehran.
- 18 March –
  - Israel assassinates intelligence minister Esmaeil Khatib following airstrikes on Tehran.
  - Israel strikes the South Pars natural gas field in the Persian Gulf and its neighboring refineries.
  - Iran launches a missile attack on Ras Laffan Industrial City, the world's largest LNG export facility, causing "extensive damage" according to QatarEnergy.
  - Iran executes a dual Iranian-Swedish national convicted on charges of spying for Israel.
- 19 March –
  - Three people are executed in Qom after being convicted on charges of killing two police officers during the 2025–2026 Iranian protests.
  - A US F-35 is damaged by Iranian fire during a combat mission over Iran and makes an emergency landing at a US airbase in the Middle East.
  - The United States Central Command (CENTCOM) reports its forces have destroyed a factory in Karaj, which assembled surface-to-surface missiles for the IRGC.
  - Qatar expels Iranian diplomatic staff handling military and security affairs due to Iranian attacks on the country.
- 20 March – Iran announces the death of IRGC spokesperson Ali Mohammad Naini and former police chief Esmail Ahmadi-Moghaddam in Israeli airstrikes in Tehran.
- 21 March –
  - Iran allegedly launches two ballistic missiles towards Diego Garcia, which houses a US–UK military base, though both fail to hit the island. Iran later denied claims that it launched missiles towards Diego Garcia, saying that it was an "Israeli false flag” attack.
  - The U.S. conducted strikes on the Natanz Nuclear Facility using bunker buster bombs to target the site.
  - More than 31 people are injured, including a 10-year-old, in Israel by Iranian ballistic missile attacks. Iran said that it targeted Shimon Peres Negev Nuclear Research Center.
  - Saudi Arabia expels the Iranian military attaché, his deputy and three other diplomatic staff due to Iranian attacks on the country.
- 22 March –
  - Airstrikes take place in several locations across Iran, including Ahvaz, Bushehr, Chabahar, Rasht, and Yazd.
  - Iran strikes central israel, injuring fifteen people.
  - Iran threatens to retaliate against the energy and water systems of the Gulf countries if U.S. President Donald Trump follows through with his 48-hour ultimatum to hit Iran's electricity grid.
- 23 March –
  - President Trump postpones US strikes against Iranian powerplants for five days amid "productive" negotiations.
  - A person is killed and another is injured in a strike on a transmission site of the Persian Gulf Radio and Television Centre in southern Iran.
- 24 March – The Iranian foreign ministry states that vessels it classifies as non-hostile may pass through the Strait of Hormuz if they comply with its safety and security requirements, while excluding vessels linked to countries it accuses of involvement in the Iran war.
- 25 March –The Royal Jordanian Air Force intercepts four missiles and one drone launched from Iran.
- 26 March – Middle East special envoy Steve Witkoff confirms that the United States has shared a 15-point peace plan to Iran through the Pakistani government. Pakistani foreign minister Ishaq Dar confirms that indirect negotiations between the United States and Iran are taking place.
- 27 March –
  - Brent crude surpasses US$110 per barrel after the Islamic Revolutionary Guard Corps Navy turns away three container ships and close the Strait of Hormuz.
  - The foreign ministers of the G7 nations reach an agreement to protect passage through the Strait if the war ends.
- 28 March – The smelter facility of Aluminium Bahrain in Askar, Bahrain, is targeted by Iranian attacks.
- 30 March –
  - Israeli leaders announce the "completion phase" of war and order the military to strike "economic" targets in Iran to damage the Iranian economy.
  - An Iranian attack on a power and water desalination plant in Kuwait kills an Indian worker and damages a building at the site.
- 31 March – Foreign minister Abbas Araghchi confirms that direct contacts, although "not negotiations", with U.S. special envoy Steve Witkoff are under way.

=== April ===
- 1 April –
  - A fuel storage at Kuwait International Airport is hit by Iranian drones, causing a major fire.
  - A U.S. strike in Tehran reportedly damages the former US embassy, which was converted into a museum following its takeover during the Iranian Revolution. The St. Nicholas Orthodox Church is also damaged.
- 2 April –
  - The Karaj B1 bridge linking Tehran and Karaj, which was inaugurated earlier this year, is hit by U.S. airstrikes. Eight people are killed.
  - Iran conducts strikes on both Amazon Web Services servers in Bahrain and on an Oracle data center in Dubai, United Arab Emirates.
- 3 April –
  - Iranian forces shoot down a U.S. Air Force F-15E Strike Eagle fighter jet over the country. After heavy fighting, the weapon systems officer (WSO) from the downed aircraft is rescued by U.S. commandos on 5 April.
  - The United Arab Emirates intercepts 18 ballistic missiles, four cruise missiles, and 47 drones from Iran.
- 4 April – Russia evacuates 198 more staff from Iran's Bushehr Nuclear Power Plant as an airstrike kills an Iranian security guard at the plant.
- 5 April –
  - Iranian media claims an American Lockheed C-130 Hercules was shot down in Isfahan, while on a search and rescue operation for a missing U.S. airman.
  - Two American C-130 transport aircraft and four MH-6 Little Bird helicopters are destroyed at a temporary U.S. base in Iran by withdrawing U.S. troops to prevent them from being captured by Iranian forces.
  - Iran executes two men convicted of attempting to storm a military facility and access armory during the 2025–2026 Iranian protests in January.
- 6 April –
  - At least 13 people are killed in an airstrike on a residential building near Eslamshahr in Tehran.
  - Explosions, likely from airstrikes, are reported in the South Pars oil field.
  - Four people are killed, seven are injured and others are reported missing in a US-Israeli air strike on a residential area in eastern Tehran.
  - Israel claims to have killed Asghar Bakri, the commander of Unit 840 of the Quds Force.
  - The IDF attacks Iran's most important petrochemical plant in Assaluyeh, causing severe damage.
  - Majid Khademi, head of the IRGC Intelligence Protection, is killed in a US-Israeli airstrike.
  - Pakistan proposes a ceasefire plan received by Iran and the United States, reportedly dubbed the Islamabad Accord, which calls for an immediate halt to hostilities, the reopening of the Strait of Hormuz, and a 15–20 day period of negotiations between Iran and the U.S. This comes following reported talks between Pakistani army chief Asim Munir, U.S. vice president JD Vance, U.S. special envoy Steve Witkoff, and Iranian foreign minister Abbas Araghchi. The plan is later rejected by Iran.
  - Overnight attacks on Bandar Lengeh and Kong kill six people and injure 17 others.
  - The mosque and filling station at the Sharif University of Technology in Tehran, are damaged in an airstrike, causing a gas outage in the neighbourhood.
- 7 April –
  - Reports indicate nighttime attacks in the greater Tehran area, in Ahvaz, Chahbahar, Jask, Shiraz, and Yazd, as well as near Shahid Kalantari Port, Tis Port, and the Imam Ali base.
  - The Rafi'-Nia synagogue in central Tehran is destroyed in an airstrike.
  - U.S and Israeli warplanes strike Iranian military targets on Kharg Island, causing several massive explosions.
  - Human chain protests are held across bridge and power plant structures in Iran to protest against Trump's threats against civilian infrastructure.
- 8 April –
  - Iranian foreign minister Abbas Araghchi confirms the two-week ceasefire between the United States and Iran and says that Iran will allow a safe passage for ships crossing the Strait of Hormuz. Iran also says that it will halt defensive operations if strikes against the country stop. The ceasefire is ratified by the Supreme National Security Council.
  - A pro-government protest is held in Tehran after the ceasefire is announced, with protesters chanting Death to America, Death to Israel, and death to compromisers. Protesters also burn the American and Israeli flags.
  - Iranian media says that Iran paused Hormuz traffic over Israeli attacks in Lebanon.
- 11 April –
  - Delegations of the United States and Iran arrive in Islamabad, Pakistan for ceasefire talks.
  - Trump says that American forces has started "clearing" the Strait of Hormuz. The Wall Street Journal reports that several US Navy destroyers entered the Strait of Hormuz for the first time since the war began.
- 12 April – JD Vance announces that the talks between the US and Iran had failed, as he was unable to reach an agreement after a day of negotiations. Afterwards, Trump declares a naval blockade on the Strait of Hormuz, announcing that the U.S. Navy will prevent ships from entering or exiting the Strait and intercept vessels that have paid tolls to Iran.
- 17 April – Iran announces that passage of commercial vessels through the Hormuz Strait is completely open during the truce in Lebanon.
- 18 April – Iran says that it closed the Strait of Hormuz again in response to the US refusing to lift its naval blockade.
- 21 April – President Trump extends the truce indefinitely at Pakistan's request.
- 22 April – The US extends sanctions relief on Iranian oil for another 30 days.
- 23 April – Trump orders the US Navy to destroy any Iranian boats laying mines in Hormuz.

=== May ===
- 5 May – Eight people are killed in a fire at a shopping center in Andisheh, Tehran province.
- 6 May – President Trump announces a temporary halt in the US military's "Project Freedom" operation to reopen the Strait of Hormuz, citing "great progress" toward a potential agreement with Iran.
- 25 May –
  - President Pezeshkian orders to end the internet blackout.
  - The US Central Command reports "self-defense" strikes on Iran, saying that the ceasefire is still in place, with several Iranian soldiers reportedly killed. According to Iranian sources, prior to the US attacks, the Iranian military targeted a ship at sea.
- 26 May – Iran partially restores internet.
- 27 May – Iran releases 10 Indian sailors who were detained since their tanker was intercepted in July 2025 following “sustained diplomatic engagement”.

=== June ===
- 4 June – Supreme leader Mojtaba Khamenei declares victory over Israel and the United States.
- 7 June – Iran launches ballistic missiles towards Israel, saying that it targeted Ramat David Airbase. Israel says that it downed all the missiles.
- 8 June — The IDF announces that it struck military sites in central and western Iran, with explosions being reported in Tehran, Isfahan, and Tabriz, killing two Iranian soldiers. This triggers an exchange of strikes between the two countries joined by the Houthis that stop later in the day.
- 9 June — US President Donald Trump says that Iran had shot down a US helicopter over the Strait of Hormuz. Iran says that it did not deliberately target the helicopter. Centcom later says that it launched "self-defense" strikes on Iran in retaliation. One of the strikes damages two water reservoir tanks in Sirik, resulting in Iran stating that 20,000 people had lost access to safe drinking water.
- 10 June —
  - Iran says that it launched strikes aimed at the US Fifth Fleet, Ali Al Salem Air Base and Muwaffaq Salti Air Base housing F-35s in retaliation to the US strikes.
  - The US military launches strikes on multiple Iranian targets, firing 49 Tomahawk missiles in the process. Initial US attacks with precision munition allegedly targets facilities for providing drinking water near Bemani. Local authorities claim some 20,000 people lost access to water supply.
- 11 June–19 July – Iran participates at the 2026 FIFA World Cup.
- 11 June — Iran declares the indefinite closure of the Strait of Hormuz and says that it fired at communication antennas and radar facilities of US 5th Fleet, American military bases in Kuwait and Bahrain and an American command center in Jordan in response to the US attacks.
- 14 June — Trump and Iran announce that they had reached an agreement to end the war and reopen the Strait of Hormuz. Trump also says that he had authorized the lifting of the US naval blockade of Iran. The US military later clarifies that the blockade remains in effect until the agreement is signed on 19 June.
- 15 June — US Vice President JD Vance announces that the Islamabad Memorandum was digitally signed by the US and Iran the previous day.
- 17 June — Trump and President Pezeshkian sign the memorandum of understanding to end the war, with Trump signing the document during dinner with French President Emmanuel Macron at the Palace of Versailles after the G7 summit.
- 18 June —
  - Pakistan states that the signing of the US-Iran memorandum of understanding to end the war implies Tehran will reopen the Hormuz "instantly" and the American blockade of Iranian ports will end "immediately."
  - CENTCOM announces that it had removed the naval blockade of Iranian ports.
- 20 June — Iran declares that it closed the Strait of Hormuz again due to Israeli strikes in Lebanon, describing them as a violation of its deal with the US.
- 22 June — The US gives Iran a 60-day general licence for oil sales, as required by the MOU.
- 25 June — Iran declares the new Hormuz route "unacceptable and dangerous", warning against ships transiting without clearance.
- 26 June — Trump accuses Iran of violating the truce with US by launching drone attacks on ships in the Hormuz. CENTCOM later announces that in retaliation to the alleged truce violations, the US hit Iranian missile and drone storage facilities, as well as coastal radar stations.
- 27 June —
  - Iran says it targeted US sites in the Gulf region in response to the attack the previous day.
  - The US military announces it struck Iranian military facilities in retaliation for an alleged Iranian attack against a ship in the Hormuz.
- 28 June — Iran says carries out air attacks on Ali Al Salem Air Base in Kuwait and Naval Support Activity Bahrain in retaliation for US attacks against five Iranian coastal sites.
- 28 June — The U.S. and Iran agree to stop attacks between them.
- 30 June — Gunmen kill two soldiers in Paveh.

=== July ===
- 2 July – Iran states that IAEA inspectors will not be permitted entry under any circumstances to the Fordow, Natanz, and Isfahan nuclear sites, which were bombed and damaged by the US, citing a law passed by the Islamic Consultative Assembly and the Supreme National Security Council.
- 4 July — The state funeral for former Supreme Leader Ali Khamenei begins at the Grand Mosalla of Tehran.
- 5 July — Iranian state media reports that Iran and Qatar renewed maritime trade following an almost five-month halt.
- 7 July — Iran reportedly launches at least two missiles at commercial vessels in the Strait of Hormuz. The US announces that it revoked an oil sale and production deal with Iran in retaliation to the attacks.
- 8 July — Iran says that it shot down an American MQ9 drone in southern Iran, and attacked US military targets in Bahrain and Kuwait in retaliation to alleged truce breaches. Iranian state media announces that eight soldiers were killed in US attacks ‌in Bandar Abbas and Bushehr, along with two fishermen. U.S. Central Command announces that it hit roughly 90 Iranian military targets along the country's coastline.
- 9 July —
  - Former Supreme Leader Ali Khamenei is buried at the Imam Reza shrine in Mashhad.
  - Iran says that it targeted US bases in Kuwait, Bahrain, and Qatar. while 14 people were killed and 78 others were injured in American attacks in Iran.
- 11 July — The IRGC navy says that it closed the Strait until further notice after firing a warning shot at a vessel trying to transit through an unapproved route.
- 12 July — Iran claims that it attacked US military facilities in Bahrain, Jordan, Qatar, Kuwait and Oman. Qatar announces that three people were injured in the attacks.
- 13 July — US President Donald Trump announces that the US will reinstate the "Iranian blockade in the Strait of Hormuz" and impose a 20% toll on cargo shipping through the strait. The US-led Combined Maritime Forces' Joint Maritime Information Centre (JMIC) announces that the blockade will start the following day.
- 14 July —
  - Iran carries out attacks in Bahrain and Jordan.
  - Fars News reports that overnight American attacks in Hormozgan province killed three people.
  - Iran executes two men convicted of being Islamic State militants.
  - Fifty-five Iranian fishermen are released from Emirati custody.
- 15 July —
  - The US reinstates its naval blockade on Iranian ports.
  - IRIB reports that an American attack hit a wheat storage silo in Hoveyzeh.
  - Iran executes a person found guilty of arson amid anti-government protests.
  - Iran says that American attacks on a military base in Bampur killed seven soldiers and injured several. The US military also conducts strikes on Greater Tunb Island.
- 16 July — Iran carries out attacks at American military targets in Jordan, Kuwait and Bahrain. CENTCOM says it had expanded strikes into northern Iran.
- 17 July — Iranian state media reports that US attacks on infrastructure in southern and western Iran killed eight people and injured 20 others.
- 18 July —
  - Iran states that power facilities and desalination water pumps in Jask were struck, cutting of water supply to 10,000 people. Iranian Deputy Foreign Minister Kazem Gharibabadi states that Iran suspended implementation of MoU commitments as part of the interim deal with the US, accusing the latter of breaching its own obligations.
  - Iran executes a person who was convicted of killing a security agent during the Mahsa Amini protests. (Note: According to rights groups, the Iranian government regularly uses forced confessions gained through torture to covict protestors. The government disputes the accusations.)
- 19 July —
  - The Atomic Energy Organization of Iran states that Americans struck Darkhovin Nuclear Power Plant.
  - Iran executes two people found guilty of killing four police officers amid anti-government protests.
- 20 July —
  - Iranian state media reports that the US attacked an industrial facility in Khomeyn.
  - A magnitude 5.2 earthquake hits Kermanshah province, injuring 20 people.
- 22 July — Iran executes a person whom it accused of aiding Israel and America amid anti-government protests.
- 24 July —
  - Iran executes six people for supposed connections to the People's Mojahedin Organization of Iran.
  - The European Union sanctions Iranian judges for suspected human rights violations, as well as a leader of a cyber group that supported the regime's repression of information.
  - The US Treasury Department announces sanctions against four individuals and nine Iranian-linked organizations connected to businessman Babak Zanjani for enabling the Iranian regime to evade sanctions.
- 25 July — The US ceases overnight strikes against Iran after 13 nights.
- 26 July – Alamut Castle is designated as a UNESCO World Heritage Site.
- 28 July — Iran executes two people for killing security forces during anti-government protests.
- 29 July — US imposes fresh Iranian regime-related sanctions against insurers and more tankers.
- 30 July
  - The US military states that it executed a heavy series of retaliatory strikes on dozens of targets in Iran. Iranian state media reports that one of those strikes hit a residential building in Qeshm Island and killed a family of three including a two-year-old child.
  - The United States targets Iranian airline Mahan Air in new sanctions.

=== August ===
- 3 August — Iran executes two people suspected of spying for Israel during the war.
- 5 August — The US lifts sanctions on three IRGC-connected entities.
- 7 August — The US sanctions a Dubai crypto exchange for assisting the Iranian regime.
- 8 August — Yalda Moaiery is sentenced to 15 years in jail by the Islamic Revolutionary Court after being accused of giving interviews to media outlets considered unfriendly by the Iranian regime and delivering images to organizations purportedly connected to the US and Israel.
- 15 August —
  - The Iranian military accuses the Qatar Armed Forces of capturing three Iranian Sukhoi Su-24 fighter jet pilots after their planes were shot down by Qatari air defences after an Iranian strike on Al Udeid Air Base in early March as part of the 2026 Iran war, adding that the pilots had been barred from meeting or communicating with Iranian officials or their families for six months. (Note: Qatar shot down two Iranian Su-24 bombers on 2 March 2026. One Iranian fighter jet pilot was killed in the strike.)
  - The Intelligence Ministry accuses two French diplomats of participation in what it referred to as an "infiltration and interference" operation inside Iran.
- 16 August —
  - Iran executes a person for wounding police officers using a vehicle amidst the anti-government protests.
  - Iran Army Chief Amir Hatami declares that the army is offering a bounty of $30,000 for killing or capturing invading US soldiers, with the payment doubled if carried out by an Iranian woman.
- 17 August — The 60-day deadline for the US and Iran to negotiate a “final deal” to end the war expires.
- 20 August —
  - Iran executes an individual over participation in the anti-government protests, saying that he was involved in incidents which led to the killing of security forces amidst the protests.
  - Declaring "economic D-Day," Trump announces that any nation trading with the Iranian regime would be sanctioned.
- 22 August — Iran allows several Iraqi oil tankers to sail through the Strait of Hormuz after receiving repeated Iraqi requests through various channels, notably during the visit of parliament speaker Mohammad Bagher Ghalibaf to Iraq.
- 23 August —
  - Iran executes a person over the anti-government protests.
  - Authorities announce the discovery of more than 7.5 trillion cubic feet of natural gas south of Fars province.
  - Iran issues a $10 million bounty for Barron Trump.
- 24 August —
  - US Treasury Secretary Scott Bessent announces a new US sanctions campaign against the Iranian regime dubbed Operation Economic Outcast, warning that every country has a set deadline to halt economic activities with the regime identified by Washington or risk Treasury action that includes the removal of the US dollar financial system.
  - Iran announces it blacklisted 45 tankers which have violated its rules for passing through Hormuz, and would take action against any vessels transferring loads with them.
- 26 August — Iranian authorities declare that several Persian-language media outlets operating outside Iran including BBC Persian, Iran International and Radio Farda are incorporated in their “military target bank".
- 27 August — Authorities declare that 40% of the capacity at the South Pars gas field has been restored after an Israeli attack on the gas field during the war.
- 28 August —
  - The US Treasury declares that it has cut off all Banque Misr's UAE branches from dollar transactions due to its dealings with Iran.
  - Supreme Leader Mojtaba Khamenei bans acts that "harm social cohesion."
  - Iran's ambassador to Russia, Kazem Jalali, announces the resumption of a 2022 project to export 55 billion cubic meters of natural gas annually into Iran via Azerbaijan.
- 30 August — US forces state that they targeted two Iranian launchers on Larak Island after IRGC forces were identified preparing to launch rockets carrying sea mines toward the Hormuz. The IRGC state that the attack killed and injured several Iranian soldiers and civilians.
- 31 August —
  - Iran claims to have retaliated by attacking U.S. bases in Jordan and U.S. military assets in the United Arab Emirates.
  - Iran sentences two female citizens to death for anti-government protests.

=== September ===
- 1 September —
  - The US announces that it struck IRGC targets in Iran following attacks on its soldiers and commercial shipping in the Strait of Hormuz. Iranian state media says that US targets included Jiroft Airport, and that a US strike in Kuhestak killed five people including two children and injured over 63 others in a wedding.
  - Eleven vessels are blacklisted by Iran from traversing through the Strait of Hormuz.
- 2 September –
  - Peru severs diplomatic relations with Iran, accusing the latter of escalating the 2026 Iran war.
  - A vessel smuggling fuel in the Gulf is seized by Iran.
- 4 September – The US Treasury announces that it has cut off Turkish investment bank Golden Global Yatirim Bankasi Anonim Sirketi and two subsidiaries from dollar transactions because of their dealings with the Iranian regime.
- 5 September –
  - The US military reports that it destroyed three IRGC-connected oil tankers in response to latter's fire on its warships. The IRGC states that it targeted three oil tankers which were traversing through Hormuz without its approval, adding that it launched strikes on three additional US vessels in other areas following the US attacks.
  - Ten people are killed and six others are wounded in a fuel tanker explosion on the Hamadan-Sanandaj Highway caused by a traffic accident.
  - Iran releases a Jewish Iranian-American imprisoned for visiting Israel to attend his son's bar mitzvah, but prohibits him from leaving the country.
- 6 September – The government announces that it will raise gasoline prices for heavy users because of the 2026 Iran war and sanctions.
- 8 September –
  - A Basij commander is killed in a “terrorist attack” in Parud District.
  - The US imposes new sanctions on Iranian airlines and service providers.
- 9 September –
  - The US announces that it destroyed five Iranian tankers in retaliation to additional attempted missile attacks on one of its Navy warships. Iran then carries out attacks on Jordan, two US vessels and eight oil tankers in Hormuz. The IRGC claim related to the US vessels is denied by the US. Iran announces that it targeted US military sites in Jordan, damaging nine aircraft.
  - A Sunni cleric who was also a Basij member is killed in northwestern Iran.
  - The IAEA reports Iran to the UN Security Council for non-proliferation violations for the first time in two decades.
- 10 September –
  - Iran waives freight fees for foreign vessels transporting energy-related goods to and from the country.
  - Construction activity at Pickaxe Mountain is confirmed by the IAEA.
- 12 September – Three members of the security forces are killed during clashes with gunmen in Saravan.
- 14 September –
  - Austria prevents the head of the Atomic Energy Organization of Iran, Mohammad Eslami, from attending the IAEA's annual conference in Vienna due to US opposition, citing its sanctions against him.
  - A senior Sunni cleric is killed by unknown gunmen in southeastern Iran.
  - The US imposes new sanctions on VTB Bank for alleged ties to the Iranian regime. (Note: VTB, already cut off from the dollar system due to Russia's invasion of Ukraine, now faces Iran-related sanctions, potentially exposing foreign banks and businesses to additional penalties, according to the US Treasury.)
- 16 September — Sweden expels an employee of the Iranian embassy due to security concerns. Iran expels a Swedish diplomat in response.
- 17 September —
  - A UN mission finds grounds to believe that the US committed war crimes in the 2026 Minab school attack and the 2026 Lamerd sports hall attack, while the Iranian regime committed crimes against humanity during its suppression of the 2025-2026 Iranian protests.
  - The US sanctions Iranian financier Babak Zanjani's cryptocurrency exchange for processing payments for ships to safely transit through Hormuz.
  - The US announces that it will restrict "luxury splurge" shopping by the Iranian regime during the UN General Assembly.
- 18 September –
  - Russia and China veto a US proposal for UN experts to continue monitoring UN sanctions on Iran over its nuclear program.
  - About 313,000 volunteers participate in a large-scale government-organized parade in Tehran that includes specialized units for women and demonstrated drone operations, weapon handling, and tactical maneuvers.
- 19 September –
  - Turkey revokes Bank Mellat's operating license amid the US-led economic isolation campaign against Iran.
  - Iran executes a person convicted of espionage for Mossad.
  - US President Donald Trump signs into law the “Lindsey O Graham Sanctioning Russia and Iran Act of 2026”, which in part allows him to extend existing sanctions on Iran.
- 20 September – Iran orders the closure of French language center in Tehran, alleging that it carried out “illegal acts that violated diplomatic conventions”.
- 21 September – State media claims that the US denied visas to several members of Iran's delegation ahead of the UN General Assembly.
- 22 September – The judiciary seizes 2,191 bank accounts and 39 vehicles owned by regime critics.
- 23 September –
  - President Pezeshkian arrives in New York to speak at the United Nations General Assembly, the first time an elected leader from a nation at war with the United States sets foot on American soil to address a UN gathering.
  - Authorities announce that they restored 50% of the damaged production capacity at the South Pars/North Dome Gas-Condensate field.
  - The Central Bank of the United Arab Emirates bans Bank Melli Iran from the operating in that country, citing regulations noncompliance.
- 23 September – IRGC brigadier general Hossein Zarifi is killed during an operation against an unspecified militant group in Saravan, Sistan and Balochistan.
- 24 September – The UAE General Civil Aviation Authority announces that Iranian airlines' flights to and from that country had been halted until further notice, citing US sanctions placed on Iranian airlines for using airports across the world.
- 25 September –
  - Colombia severs relations with Iran, alleging that the Iranian government has connections to "narco-terrorist groups that threaten the country's security."
  - Three Iraqi airports suspend Iranian flights beginning that day, following the imposition of sanctions by the US Treasury Department against dozens of companies and entities linked to Iran's aviation sector.
- 26 September – A bus overturns in Markazi province, killing 11 people and injuring 24 others.
- 28 September – Dozens of university students stage a protest at Allameh Tabataba'i University, demanding the release of imprisoned classmates and condemning the poor living conditions on campus.
- 29 September – The US sanctions ten people and entities in various jurisdictions that have acquired weapons and their parts for Iran's Ministry of Defense and Armed Forces Logistics.
- 30 September – Iran executes two people convicted for their role in killing four security forces amidst the anti-government protests in Mashhad.

=== October ===
- 1 October — The US imposes new sanctions on Iran, targeting rail, automotive, manufacturing, and steel sectors, as well as overseas suppliers, saying that the goal is to economically isolate the Iranian regime.
- 2 October — Elnaz Shakerdoost is sentenced by Iran's judiciary to one year imprisonment for criticizing the 2025–2026 Iran massacres.
- 3 October —
  - Iran states that it executed a person convicted of using military-grade munition against police amidst the 2025–2026 Iranian protests.
  - A group of Iranian detainees are freed by the UAE.
- 4 October –
  - The United States Department of State announces the expulsion of two members of the Iranian delegation who attended the recent United Nations General Assembly after they ignored an order to leave the country long after the General Assembly had ended.
  - Trump withdraws all US bombers from RAF Fairford, a British air base targeted by an attack that the UK linked to the Iranian regime, due to urgent concerns about a potentially complex drone attack ordered by the IRGC as part of a plot to target the aircraft and kill American soldiers at RAF Fairford, which is loosely modeled after Ukraine's Operation Spiderweb.
- 5 October – The US announces that foreign financial institutions doing business with Iran may be sanctioned without warning.
- 6 October – The US reports that it destroyed an Iranian-connected boat conducting surveillance after its crew was safely evacuated.
- 8 October – The US imposes additional sanctions on Iran's shadow fleet.
- 9 October – An IRGC projectile strikes the Panamanian-flagged crude oil tanker Gem No. 2 off the coast of the United Arab Emirates.
- 11 October – Iran executes a man found guilty of a 2024 Jaysh al-Adl attack on a Rask police station that killed 11 officers.
- 14 October –
  - Iran hangs a man convicted for carrying out armed attacks in Kerman during the war, accusing him of supporting exiled former Crown Prince Reza Pahlavi and Israel.
  - At least two security officials, including a woman, are killed in separate instances along the border with Pakistan, with the government blaming the killings on "terrorist groups" sponsored from outside the country.
- 15 October –
  - A German court imprisons two men convicted of plotting assaults against prominent pro-Israel public figures and spying on Jews for Iran's Quds Force.
  - The US issues new sanctions against Iran, targeting 16 individuals and 10 entities.
- 18 October – The Islamic Consultative Assembly appoints Mehrdad Akhlaghi as Minister of Defence.
- 19 October – The University of Tehran declares that female students who persist in breaching the hijab rule will be subject to disciplinary hearings.
- 20 October – Supreme National Security Council Secretary Mohsen Rezaei declares that the nation will completely bar the export of its enriched nuclear material.
- 21 October –
  - A collision between a tractor and a sedan in Sistan and Baluchestan province kills nine people.
  - The US sanctions a Panama- and Greece-based law firm, stating that it facilitated Iran’s shadow fleet for years, indirectly supporting the Iranian regime's capacity to produce income to fund its nuclear program.
- 25 October – Sri Lanka rescues 40 Iranian sailors from merchant vessels in international waters near its coast after receiving a request from the Iranian embassy through diplomatic channels, citing medical emergencies.
- 28 October –
  - Iran rejects a new peace plan put forth by Qatari mediators on 28 October 2026, saying it was unacceptable and reiterating that its nuclear policy was unchangeable. In an attempt to resume peace talks, US Vice President J. D. Vance sends a letter to Iranian National Security Council Secretary Mohsen Rezaei that same day at Trump's directive.
  - The Iranian regime sentences Jafar Panahi for five years and one month imprisonment, seizes his assets, and prohibits him from leaving the country or using social media for two years.
  - The Government of National Stability in eastern Libya bans the entry of nationals from Iran and Afghanistan.
- 30 October – The IRGC states that it intercepted two commercial oil tankers in the Strait of Hormuz, claiming that the vessels struck naval mines after ignoring transit restrictions.

=== November ===
- 1 November – Iran labels the United Kingdom's Royal Navy and Royal Air Force as terrorist groups, and MI6 as a hostile agency.
- 2 November – Small-scale strikes are carried out by the US against Iranian positions on Qeshm Island in the Strait of Hormuz.
- 3 November –
  - Iran executes two people over their alleged role in killing two police officers in Isfahan during the anti-government protests.
  - A police officer is killed by unknown attackers in Saravan County.
- 4 November – The US imposes new sanctions on companies and individuals in India and Turkey with ties to the Iranian regime.
- 5 November – An activist is sentenced to death by the regime over his posts on X.
- 6 November –
  - Eight Canadian money services companies are sanctioned by the US for dealing with the Iranian regime.
  - The US cuts off money exchanger MEXC due to transactions involving the Iranian regime.
  - Trump announces that the US conducted "minor" strikes against Iran, targeting "a little bit of an anti-aircraft device."
  - The United States Central Command declares a $20 million incentive "and possible relocation" for information about Iran's nuclear program.
- 7 November –
  - Iran executes a Jaysh al-Adl member convicted of a fatal attack on a police station in Khash.
  - The IRGC announces that it lifted a self-proclaimed restriction of 2,000 km (1,200 mi) in the range of its ballistic missiles.
  - CENTCOM expands its interdiction efforts against the Iranian regime beyond its existing naval blockade by establishing Task Force Iron Gate to obstruct "illicit" shipments and weapons transit across land borders and the Caspian Sea.
- 8 November – Iran executes three individuals whom it accused of conducting operations for Israel and the US during anti-government demonstrations.
- 8–9 November – Iranian state media reports a strike on Qeshm Island in the Strait of Hormuz overnight, but claims no infrastructural damage.
- 9 November –
  - France's ANSSI attributes the 2026 French supermarket refrigerator hack to the IRGC-affiliated Shahid Kaveh group, adding that it found links to another IRGC cyber unit, Shahid Shoostari, to multiple French cyberattacks since 2020, including those targeting the Charlie Hebdo newspaper in 2023 and the 2024 Summer Olympics.
  - The United States evacuates its military aircraft from RAF Mildenhall following a reported threat from Iran.
- 10 November – After judiciary head Gholam-Hossein Mohseni-Eje'i demanded action against what he called "abnormal behavior" on Iranian streets, Iran states it had detained a number of individuals in central Tehran for "promoting the abandoning of the hijab and public nudity."
- 11 November –
  - Argentina's air force and navy are named "terrorist organizations" by Iran.
  - Iranian forces attack ship navigation systems on Didamar Island, Oman, causing an unknown amount of damage.
- 12 November – Two Iranian nationals are convicted in the UK of spying on dissident journalists for Iranian intelligence with the intention of attacking them for their criticism of the Iranian regime.
- 13 November –
  - The Islamic Republic News Agency reports an "enemy" attack in Bandar Sirik.
  - A mass funeral is held for 110 unidentified Iranian soldiers killed in the Iran–Iraq War (1980–1988) after their remains were found on former battlefields.
- 14 November – Thirteen oil refinery workers are killed when a bus overturns near Dehloran.
- 17 November –
  - North Macedonia announces that it thwarted an assassination plot linked to the Iranian regime that targeted a person in neighboring Greece.
  - Following the bus accident near Dehloran, protesters gather in Abdanan, Ilam province, with social media footage showing crowds chanting "Death to the dictator" and slogans against Supreme Leader Mojtaba Khamenei in the largest demonstrations since the January 2026 protests.
- November 20 – The US Treasury sanctions "trustees" who receive oil revenues for the Iranian regime, adding that in many cases they have kept the funds for personal gain.
- November 22 – Iran institutes nationwide rolling blackouts following winter fuel shortages and wartime damage to its natural gas infrastructure.

== Deaths ==
- 3 January – Hushang Ansary, 98, minister of finance (1974–1977) and information (1971–1974), ambassador to the United States (1967–1969).
- 6 January – Saeid Pirdoost, 85, actor (Snake Fang, Son of Adam, Daughter of Eve, Great Award).
- 8 January – Mojtaba Tarshiz, 47, footballer (Shahr Khodro F.C., Sanat Mes Kerman F.C., Gostaresh Foulad F.C.).
- 21 January – Reza Rooygari, 79, actor (Eagles, The Tenants, The Old Bachelor).
- 27 January – Parviz Nouri, 87, film critic, screenwriter and director.
- 30 January – Mohammad-Hadi Abdekhodaei, 87, ayatollah, MP (1980–1988, 1992–1996) and member of the Assembly of Experts (2016–2024).
- 6 February – Nezamoddin Kiaie, 81–82, sound engineer (A Moment of Innocence, I'm Not Angry!).
- 15 February – Enayatollah Bakhshi, 80, actor (Reign of Love, All That Is, Tangna).
- 22 February – Nasser Mohammadifar, 80, brigadier general, commander of the Army Ground Forces (2001–2005).
- 23 February – Ali Babachahi, 83, poet and writer.
- 25 February – Abdul Majid Arfaei, 86, Elamitologist.
- 28 February –
  - Hossein Jabal Amelian, military officer, chairman of the SPND (since 2025).
  - Saleh Asadi, military intelligence officer, head of intelligence for the Khatam al-Anbiya Central Headquarters.
  - Mohammad Baseri, 53, intelligence officer (Ministry of Intelligence and Security) involved with the Disappearance of Robert Levinson.
  - Mohsen Darrebaghi, military officer, deputy for logistics of the General Staff.
  - Ali Khamenei, 86, ayatollah, president (1981–1989), Supreme Leader (since 1989).
  - Abdolrahim Mousavi, 65–66, military officer, commander-in-chief of the Army (2017–2025) and chief of staff of the armed forces (since 2025).
  - Reza Mozaffari Nia, 66–67, military officer, chairman of the SPND (2021–2025).
  - Aziz Nasirzadeh, 62, military officer, commander of the Iranian Air Force (2019–2021) and minister of defence (since 2024).
  - Mohammad Pakpour, 64, military officer, commander of IRGC-GF (2009–2025) and IRGC (since 2025).
  - Gholamreza Rezaian, military officer, head of the Islamic Republic of Iran Police Intelligence Organization (SAFA) (since 2022).
  - Ali Shamkhani, 70, military officer and politician, minister of defence (1997–2005), secretary of the Supreme National Security Council (2013–2023), and member of Expediency Discernment Council (since 2023).
  - Mohammad Shirazi, military officer, head of the Military Office of the Supreme Leader (since 1989).
- 2 March – Bahram Hosseini Motlagh, military officer, deputy for operations of the General Staff (2021–2024).
- 17 March –
  - Ali Larijani, 67, politician, Secretary of the Supreme National Security Council (2005–2007, since 2025).
  - Gholamreza Soleimani, 61–62, military officer, commander of Basij (since 2019).
- 18 March –
  - Mohammad Ebrahim Jannaati, 93, ayatollah.
  - Esmaeil Khatib, 64–65, cleric and politician, minister of intelligence (since 2021).
- 19 March – Saleh Mohammadi, 19, wrestler.
- 20 March –
  - Aref, 84, pop singer.
  - Ali Mohammad Naini, 69, brigadier general, spokesperson for the IRGC (since 2024).
- 26 March – Alireza Tangsiri, 63–64, naval officer, commander of the IRGC Navy (since 2018).
- 31 March – Jamshid Eshaghi, 64, brigadier general.
- 6 April – Majid Khademi, major general and intelligence officer, head of the IRGC Intelligence Organization (since 2025).
- 8 April – Kamal Kharazi, 81, politician, minister of foreign affairs (1997–2005), permanent representative to the UN (1989–1997), and member of the EDC (since 2022).
- 15 April – Hossein Mousavi Tabrizi, 78, judge and politician, attorney general of the Islamic Revolutionary Court (1981–1984).
- 28 April – Enayatollah Atashi, 81, basketball coach (national team) and commentator.
- 29 April – Heydar Abbasi, 83, poet.
- 30 April – Abdollah Movahed, 86, wrestler, Olympic champion (1968).
- 15 May – Yahya Dehghanpour, 85, photographer.
- 23 May – Parviz Ghelichkhani, 80, footballer (Taj, Persepolis, national team).
- 30 May – Jamshid Gharajedaghi, 88, business theorist (University of Pennsylvania, Villanova University).
- 2 June – Homa Mirafshar, 89, poet.
- 4 June – Marjane Satrapi, 56, author (Chicken with Plums) and director (Persepolis, Dear Paris).
- 13 June – Shahrzad Javaheri, 49, actress.
- 16 June – Afsaneh Malek, 83, singer.
- 23 June – Azar Azima, 98, singer.
- 30 June – Mahmoud Mollaghasemi, 97, freestyle wrestler, Olympic bronze medallist (1952).
- 3 July –
  - Manouchehr Farid, 88, actor (Downpour, Ballad of Tara, Brick and Mirror).
  - Shahrnush Parsipur, 80, writer and translator.
- 19 July – Esmaeil Yaghmaei, 84, archaeologist and writer.
- 22 July – Shir-Mohammad Espandar, 98, musician.
- 24 July – Akbar Abdi, 65, actor (The Tenants, Mother, Ekhrajiha).
- 12 August – Iraj, 93, classical music singer.
- 24 August – Asadollah Nasr Esfahani, 99, military officer, minister of interior (1977–1978).
- 3 September – Keyvan Khosrovani, 88, architect.
- 4 September – Javad Mojabi, 86, poet and writer.
- 21 September – Mousa Shubairi Zanjani, 98, Twelver Shia marja.
- 12 October – Zaynolabideen Ghorbani, 93, ayatollah, MP (1984–1988) and member of the Assembly of Experts (1990–2024).
- 15 October – Pirouz Mojtahedzadeh, 80, political scientist and historian.
- 19 October – Yusef Majidzadeh, 90, archaeologist.
- 25 October – Mohsen Rastani, 67, photographer and photojournalist.
- 1 November – Hamid Alidoosti, 70, football player (Daraei, national team) and manager (Sorkhpooshan).
- 2 November – Hassan Habibi, 86, Olympic football player (1964) and manager.
- 5 November –
  - Ali-Asghar Fani, 72, politician, minister of education (2005, 2013–2016).
  - Hossein Omoumi, 82, musician.
- 8 November – Kourosh Zarei, 54, actor.
- 17 November – Hossein Wahid Khorasani, 105, grand ayatollah.
