= 2025 in Iran =

- Decades: 2000s; 2010s; 2020s
- See also: Other events of 2025; Years in Iran

Events in the year 2025 in Iran.

== Incumbents ==
- Supreme Leader of Iran: Ali Khamenei
- President of Iran: Masoud Pezeshkian
- Speaker of the Parliament: Mohammad Bagher Ghalibaf
- Chief Justice: Gholam-Hossein Mohseni-Eje'i

== Events ==
=== January ===
- 8 January – The Iranian government releases Italian journalist Cecilia Sala from prison, with Sala arriving back in Rome later that day.
- 9 January – A Swiss national is reported to have died by suicide at a prison in Semnan following his arrest on espionage charges.
- 15 January – A light aircraft of the Law Enforcement Command of the Islamic Republic of Iran crashes near Rasht during a training flight, killing all three people on board.
- 17 January – President Masoud Pezeshkian signs a "comprehensive strategic partnership treaty" with Russia.
- 18 January – Assassination of Iranian Supreme Court judges: Two judges of the Supreme Court of Iran are killed in a shooting inside the Palace of Justice in Tehran. The attacker commits suicide.
- 22 January – An Iranian military aircraft crashes near Kabudarahang, Hamadan Province during a training flight, injuring its two pilots.

=== February ===
- 6 February –
  - A woman stands naked on the hood of a police car in Mashhad as part of a protest against Iran's compulsory hijab law.
  - The Islamic Revolutionary Guard Corps Navy vessel Shahid Bagheri, Iran's first drone-carrier warship, is inaugurated.
- 13 February – Two British nationals are reported to have been arrested in Kerman for security-related offences.

=== March ===
- 2 March – The Islamic Consultative Assembly removes Abdolnaser Hemmati as economy minister after 182 of 273 MPs vote for his impeachment, citing an ongoing economic crisis.
- 5 March – Singer Mehdi Yarrahi is flogged as part of his conviction for alcohol-related offenses.
- 6 March – One person is killed in an explosion and fire at a military facility in Tehran.
- 17 March – French national Olivier Grondeau, who had been imprisoned in Iran since 2022 on espionage charges, is released and repatriated to France.
- 25 March – Iran qualifies for the 2026 FIFA World Cup after a 2-2 draw against Uzbekistan at the 2026 FIFA World Cup qualification in Tehran.

=== April ===
- 1 April – The United States Department of Justice charges Iranian businessmen Hossein Akbari and Reza Amidi with money laundering and conspiring to obtain drone components in the US for the Islamic Revolutionary Guard Corps.
- 5 April – President Pezeshkian dismisses Shahram Dabiri Oskuei as vice president for parliamentary affairs amid criticism over the latter going on a high-priced vacation to Argentina and Antarctica during Nowruz amid an economic crisis in Iran.
- 7 April – Seven miners are killed in a gas leak at a coal mine near Damghan.
- 12 April –
  - Eight Pakistani laborers are killed in an attack in Mehrestan County, Sistan and Baluchestan province.
  - Iran and the United States hold their first high-level negotiations since 2018 over the Iranian nuclear programme in Oman.
- 14 April – The European Union imposes sanctions on seven Iranian judges, prosecutors and penal officials, including Evin Prison director Hedayatollah Farzadi, over the detention of EU citizens in Iran on "spurious grounds".
- 15 April – President Pezeshkian accepts the resignation of Vice President for Strategic Affairs Mohammad Javad Zarif.
- 24 April – Four employees of the state broadcaster IRIB are arrested on charges related to the airing of a program insulting the Sunni caliph Abu Bakr.
- 26 April – 2025 Bandar Abbas port explosion: An explosion and fire at the Port of Shahid Rajaee kills 57 people and injures more than 1,000 others.
- 29 April – 2025 Isfahan explosion: An explosion at a chemical warehouse in Meymeh, Isfahan Province, kills two people and injures two others.
- 30 April – Iran executes Mohsen Langarneshin, an inmate of Ghezel Hesar prison in Karaj who was convicted of spying for Israel and involvement in the assassination of IRGC colonel Hassan Sayyad Khodaei in 2022 following a trial described as unfair by human rights advocates.

=== May ===
- 1 May – A magnitude 4.8 earthquake hits Razavi Khorasan province, injuring 29 people.
- 4 May – The Iranian defence ministry announces that it had tested a new ballistic missile called Qassem Basir.
- 16 May – France files a case at the International Court of Justice against Iran accusing it of violating the rights of two French nationals arrested and imprisoned in the country since 2022 and holding them hostage.
- 21 May – Iran executes the convicted perpetrator of the 2023 attack on the Azerbaijani embassy in Tehran.
- 24 May – Film director Jafar Panahi wins the Palme d'Or at the 2025 Cannes Film Festival for his film It Was Just an Accident.
- 27 May – A judge is fatally stabbed by two assailants in Shiraz.

=== June ===
- 4 June –
  - Iran arrests 13 Islamic State – Khorasan Province members, including its leader and suicide bombers, in counter-terrorism operations across multiple provinces.
  - US President Donald Trump issues a proclamation barring Iranian nationals from entering the United States.
- June 5 – Murder of Elaheh Hosseinnejad: A 24-year old Iranian woman who worked as a nail technician is found murdered in Tehran.
- 10 June – Iran executes nine Islamic State militants involved in clashes in the west of the country in 2018 that killed three IRGC members.
- 11 June – Three people are killed in an explosion and fire at a chemical factory in Bandar-e Dayyer.
- 12 June – The International Atomic Energy Agency rules that Iran has been in breach of its non-proliferation obligations for the first time since 2005.
- 13 June –
  - Israel conducts airstrikes against Iran, with explosions reported in Tehran. Multiple military officials are killed in the attacks, including IRGC commander Hossein Salami and armed forces chief of staff Mohammad Bagheri.
  - Iran launches airstrikes at Israel in response to the previous airstrikes.
- 16 June –
  - The headquarters of the state broadcaster IRIB in Tehran is bombed by Israel during a live broadcast, killing at least one person.
  - Pakistan orders an indefinite closure of its border with Iran amid the Twelve-Day War.
- 20 June –
  - Australia suspends operations at its embassy in Tehran due to escalating security risks; consular staff are redeployed to Azerbaijan.
  - A magnitude 5.1 earthquake hits Semnan Province, injuring 11 people.
- 21 June – United States strikes on Iran: The United States Air Force carries out an operation on Iran, entering the U.S. into the Twelve-Day War.
- 23 June – The Iranian Air Force launches ballistic missiles towards Al Udeid Air Base in Qatar, which houses the U.S. Air Force. The missiles are intercepted by the Qatar Armed Forces.
- 24 June – A ceasefire announced by US President Donald Trump to end the Twelve-Day War comes into effect.
- 25 June – The Islamic Consultative Assembly votes in favor of suspending Iran's cooperation with the IAEA.
- 26 June – The Guardian Council votes in favor of suspending Iran's cooperation with the IAEA.

=== July ===
- 2 July – President Pezeshkian orders the suspension of Iran's cooperation with the IAEA.
- 11 July – The Prehistoric Sites of the Khorramabad Valley are designated as World Heritage Sites by UNESCO.
- 14 July – Seven people are injured in an explosion at a housing block in Qom.
- 19 July –
  - A bus overturns in Fars province, killing 21 people and injuring 34 others.
  - One person is killed in a fire at the Abadan Refinery.
- 21 July – Iran carries out a sub-orbital satellite test flight involving the Qased rocket.
- 23 July – Public services in Tehran and seven other provinces are ordered closed due to a heatwave.
- 26 July – Nine people, including three attackers, are killed in an attack by gunmen on a courthouse in Zahedan.
- 27 July – Two members of the People's Mojahedin Organization of Iran are executed on charges of plotting terrorist attacks.

=== August ===
- 4 August – The Supreme National Security Council establishes a new security council, the Supreme National Defense Council.
- 5 August – President Pezeshkian appoints Ali Larijani as secretary of the Supreme National Security Council for a second time, replacing Ali Akbar Ahmadian.
- 6 August – Iran executes two people convicted on separate charges of spying for Israel and plotting attacks on behalf of Islamic State.
- 9 August – A passenger train derails after hitting an excavator in Tabas, injuring 30 people.
- 20 August – Iran conducts its first solo military exercises since the Twelve-Day War with Israel, firing missiles and drones in the Indian Ocean during the Sustainable Power 1404 drill.
- 22 August – Five police officers are killed in an ambush on two police vehicles near Iranshahr, Sistan and Baluchestan province.
- 26 August – Australia expels the Iranian Ambassador, Ahmad Sadeghi, and announces plans to designate the IRGC as a terrorist organisation after the Australian Security Intelligence Organisation finds the IRGC responsible for instigating two attacks on a Jewish restaurant and a synagogue in 2024.
- 27 August – Thirteen militants are killed in clashes with security forces in Sistan and Baluchestan province.

=== September ===
- 8 September – Iranian border guards open fire on a group of 120 Afghan migrants attempting to enter the country at the Golshan border crossing in Sistan and Baluchestan, killing six people.
- 9 September – Iran signs an agreement with the IAEA in Egypt to resume its cooperation with the nuclear agency.
- 16 September – The United States imposes sanctions on Iranian nationals Alireza Derakhshan and Arash Estaki Alivand for facilitating the purchase of over $100 million worth of cryptocurrency for oil sales for the Iranian government.
- 17 September – A man is executed on charges of spying for Israel.
- 24 September – A Tanzania-flagged vessel carrying 2,500 tons of cement partially submerges south of Kish Island. All nine crew members are rescued.
- 26 September – Iran signs an agreement with Russia allowing for the construction of a nuclear power plant in Bandar Sirik, Hormozgan Province.
- 28 September – UN sanctions that had been lifted under the Joint Comprehensive Plan of Action in 2015 are officially reimposed on Iran over its nuclear program.
- 29 September – The European Union reinstates sanctions on Iran over its nuclear program.

=== October ===
- 2 October – One person is killed while four others are injured in the explosion of a suspected hydrogen capsule at a laboratory of Tehran University’s engineering and technical college in the Amir Abad district of Tehran.
- 4 October – Iran executes six people convicted on charges of plotting attacks in Khorramshahr on behalf of Israel.
- 8 October – French-German cyclist Lennart Monterlo, who was placed under detention while traveling in Iran in June, is released and returned to France.
- 14 October – A court in Iran sentences two French nationals to more than 30 years' imprisonment on charges of spying.
- 21 October – A magnitude 5.0 earthquake hits Fars province, injuring eight people.
- 31 October – A major wildfire breaks out in the Hyrcanian forests near Elit, Mazandaran province.

=== November ===
- 4 November – Two French nationals detained in Iran since 2022 on charges of spying are released.
- 11 November – A man dies in Ahvaz after setting himself on fire on 2 November in protest over the closure of his family’s food stand by municipal officials, resulting in the arrest of a district mayor and an enforcer following public outcry.
- 12 November – Paniz Faryoussefi becomes the first woman to conduct a performance of the Tehran Symphony Orchestra.
- 14 November –
  - Two vehicles carrying migrants from Afghanistan overturn in Khash, Sistan and Baluchestan province, killing 13 people and injuring seven others.
  - The IRGC seizes the Marshall Islands-flagged oil tanker Talara in the Strait of Hormuz for carrying "unauthorized cargo". The ship and its 21 crew are released on 19 November.
- 16 November – Foreign minister Abbas Araghchi reports that Iran is no longer enriching uranium due in part to damage at nuclear facilities following the Twelve-Day War and U.S. strikes on nuclear sites in the country.

=== December ===
- 1 December – An Islamic Revolutionary Court sentences filmmaker Jafar Panahi in absentia to a year of imprisonment and a two-year ban on overseas travel on charges of engaging in "propaganda activities".
- 10 December – Three IRGC personnel are killed in an ambush near Lar, Sistan and Baluchestan province.
- 11 December – Goli Kouhkan, a former child bride sentenced to death for killing her husband when she was 17 years old following a five-year marriage, is released from a prison in Golestan province after blood money is raised to compensate the deceased's relatives.
- 12 December –
  - Nobel laureate Narges Mohammadi is rearrested while attending a memorial ceremony for a deceased human rights lawyer in Mashhad.
  - Authorities seize a foreign-flagged oil tanker carrying 18 South Asian crew members in the Gulf of Oman off Jask, Hormozgan province on suspicion of smuggling 6 million liters of fuel.
- 13 December – The government revises its fuel subsidy scheme and introduces partial price increases for the first time since 2019.
- 15 December – A bus overturns on a highway in Isfahan province, killing 13 people and injuring another 13.
- 20 December – The government executes a man convicted of spying for Mossad in Urmia.
- 24 December –
  - The IRGC seizes a foreign-flagged oil tanker carrying 16 crew members in the Persian Gulf on suspicion of smuggling 4 million liters of fuel.
  - Ikramuddin Saree, an exiled former Afghan police commander and a critic of the Taliban, is shot dead outside his office in Tehran.
- 28 December – The uprising begins in Tehran where demonstrations quickly shifted from economic grievances to broader anti-government demands, spreading to more than 200 towns and cities all across the country.
- 29 December – Mohammad Reza Farzin resigns as governor of the Central Bank of Iran amid protests over the falling value of the Iranian rial. He is replaced by former governor Abdolnaser Hemmati.
- 31 December –
  - A building of the Fars province government in Fasa is partially destroyed by protesters demonstrating against the ongoing economic crisis.
  - A Basij volunteer is killed during clashes with protesters demonstrating against the ongoing economic crisis in Kuhdasht, Lorestan province.

== Deaths ==
- 11 January – Fereydoon Shahbazyan, 82, composer and conductor.
- 12 January – Monireh Gorji, 95–96, teacher and mujtahid, member of the Assembly for the Final Review of the Constitution (1979).
- 14 January – Nasser Biria, 65, Shia cleric and politician.
- 15 January – Ebrahim Nabavi, 66, satirist, writer and diarist.
- 18 January –
  - Mohammad Moghiseh, 68, judge, justice of the Supreme Court (since 2020).
  - Ali Razini, 71, judge and politician, justice of the Supreme Court (since 2016) and member of the Assembly of Experts (2007–2016).
- 19 January – Jalal Matini, 96, writer.
- 1 February – Mehdi Haj Mohamad, 74, footballer (Taj, national team).
- 19 February – Gholamhossein Farzami, 79, footballer (Taj, national team).
- 12 March – Mahmoud Farshidi, 73, politician, minister of education (2005–2007).
- 18 March – Abdul Rahman Haji Ahmadi, 84, Kurdish politician.
- 21 March – Parvaneh Etemadi, 77, visual artist.
- 1 April – Faramarz Zelli, 82, footballer (Kian Tehran, PAS Tehran, national team).
- 11 April – Akbar Etemad, 95, electrical engineer, president of the Atomic Energy Organization of Iran (1974–1978).
- 30 April – Bahman Salehnia, 86, football coach.
- 1 May – Ali Yachkaschi, 86, environmentalist.
- 22 May – Hassan Kamshad, 99, translator.
- 2 June – Bahram Akasheh, 89, geophysicist and seismologist.
- 9 June – Akbar Ahmadpour, 66, politician, MP (2020–2024).
- 13 June –
  - Fereydoon Abbasi, 66, nuclear scientist, politician, and academic administrator, MP (2022–2024), president of the Atomic Energy Organization of Iran (2011–2013), and president of Imam Hossein University (2001–2011).
  - Mohammad Bagheri, 64–65, military officer, chief of the General Staff (since 2016).
  - Saeed Borji, 66–67, nuclear scientist, expert in materials engineering.
  - Seyyed Amir Hossein Feghhi, 46, nuclear engineer and academic, deputy director of the Atomic Energy Organization of Iran.
  - Amir Ali Hajizadeh, 63, military officer, commander of Islamic Revolutionary Guard Corps Aerospace Force (since 2009).
  - Gholamreza Mehrabi, military officer, deputy head of intelligence for the General Staff (since 2016).
  - Abdolhamid Minouchehr, 63, nuclear physicist and nuclear engineer.
  - Akbar Motalebizadeh, 61, nuclear scientist and academic.
  - Mehdi Rabbani, military officer, deputy for operations of the General Staff (since 2016).
  - Gholam Ali Rashid, 71–72, military officer, commander of Khatam al-Anbiya Central Headquarters (since 2016) and deputy chief of the General Staff (1999–2016).
  - Hossein Salami, 64–65, military officer, commander of the Islamic Revolutionary Guard Corps (since 2019).
  - Mohammad Mehdi Tehranchi, 60, theoretical physicist.
  - Ahmadreza Zolfaghari Daryani, 65, nuclear physicist and academic.
- 15 June –
  - Mohammad Kazemi, 63, intelligence officer, head of the Intelligence Organization of the Islamic Revolutionary Guard Corps (since 2022).
  - Hassan Mohaghegh, intelligence officer, deputy head of the Intelligence Organization of the Islamic Revolutionary Guard Corps (since 2022).
- 17 June – Ali Shadmani, 62, military officer, commander of Khatam al-Anbiya Central Headquarters (since 2025).
- 21 June –
  - Saeed Izadi, 60–61, intelligence officer, head of the Quds Force "Palestine Corps" (since 2014).
  - Behnam Shahriyari, military officer, senior member of the Islamic Revolutionary Guard Corps.
- 23 June – Mohammad Reza Seddighi Saber, 50, nuclear scientist.
- 25 June – Mahshid Moshiri, 73, novelist and lexicographer.
- 29 June – Jamal Ejlali, 78, actor.
- 12 July – Abbas Anvari, 81, physicist.
- 15 July – Gholamhossein Gheybparvar, 63, military officer, head of Basij (2016–2019).
- 18 July – Homayun, 88, actor (Topoli, Soltane Ghalbha).
- 23 July – Ahmad Tavakkoli, 74, politician, minister of labour (1981–1983), member of the Expediency Discernment Council (since 2017) and twice MP.
- 1 August –
  - Maryam Hosseinian, 50, writer.
  - Dariush Mostafavi, 80, footballer (national team) and executive, chairman of Persepolis (2008–2009) and the IRIFF (1994–1997).
- 5 August – Parviz Koozehkanani, 96, footballer (Taj, Bayer Leverkusen, national team).
- 7 August – Jasem Delavari, 38, boxer.
- 9 August – Mahmoud Farshchian, 95, painter.
- 18 August – Shahrzad, 74, actress.
- 24 August –
  - Emam-Ali Habibi, 94, freestyle wrestler, Olympic champion (1956).
  - Mehrdad Falahatgar, 65, actor.
  - Reza Soukhtehsaraei, 75, wrestler, Olympic participant (1976).
- 5 September – Hooshmand Aghili, 88, singer.
- 15 September – Habib Boromand Dashghapu, 64, Shiite cleric and politician, MP (1988–1992, 2012–2016)
- 11 October – Mohamad Kasebi, 74, actor (The Father, Saint Mary, Without Permission).
- 14 October –
  - Nasser Taghvai, 84, film director (Captain Khorshid, Tales of Kish, Unruled Paper) and screenwriter.
  - Saeed Mozaffari, 83, voice actor.
- 14 October – Alireza Afshar, 74, military officer and academic administrator, commander of Basij (1990–1998) and IRGC (1984–1987), chancellor of IHU (1998–2000).
- 19 October – Houchang Nahavandi, 92, politician and academic administrator, minister of science (1978), president of Pahlavi University (1968–1971) and the University of Tehran (1971–1976).
- 26 October – Akbar Kargarjam, 80, footballer (Rah Ahan, Taj, national team).
- 1 November – Omid Sarlak, 27, activist.
- 2 November – Aki Banayi, 81, singer.
- 3 November – Kambiz Atabay, 86, football administrator, president of FFI (1972–1979) and the AFC (1976–1978).
- 5 November –
  - Djamchid Chemirani, 83, musician.
  - Saber Kazemi, 26, volleyball player (Jakarta Bhayangkara Presisi, Al Rayyan, national team).
- 10 November – Bahram Moshiri, 78, historian.
- 11 November – Homayoun Ershadi, 78, actor (Taste of Cherry, Agora, The Kite Runner).
- 6 December – Khosrow Alikordi, 46, lawyer and human rights activist.
- 12 December – Ahmad Alizadeh, 86, politician, MP (1980–1984).
- 13 December – Mohammad Shahcheraghi, 91, ayatollah, member of the Assembly of Experts (2007–2024).
- 22 December – Mohammad-Sadegh Salehimanesh, 66, Islamic cleric and politician, governor of Qom province (2013–2015).
- 25 December – Shirin Yazdanbakhsh, 76, actress (Please Do Not Disturb, Life and a Day, Killer Spider).
- 26 December – Bahram Beyzai, 87, film director (Ballad of Tara, Bashu, the Little Stranger) and playwright (Memoirs of the Actor in a Supporting Role).
- 28 December – Seyyed Ali Shafiei, 85, Twelver Shia scholar, member of the Assembly of Experts (since 1991).
