= Yahya Dehghanpour =

Iranian photographer and educator (1941–2026)

- یحیی دهقان‌پور
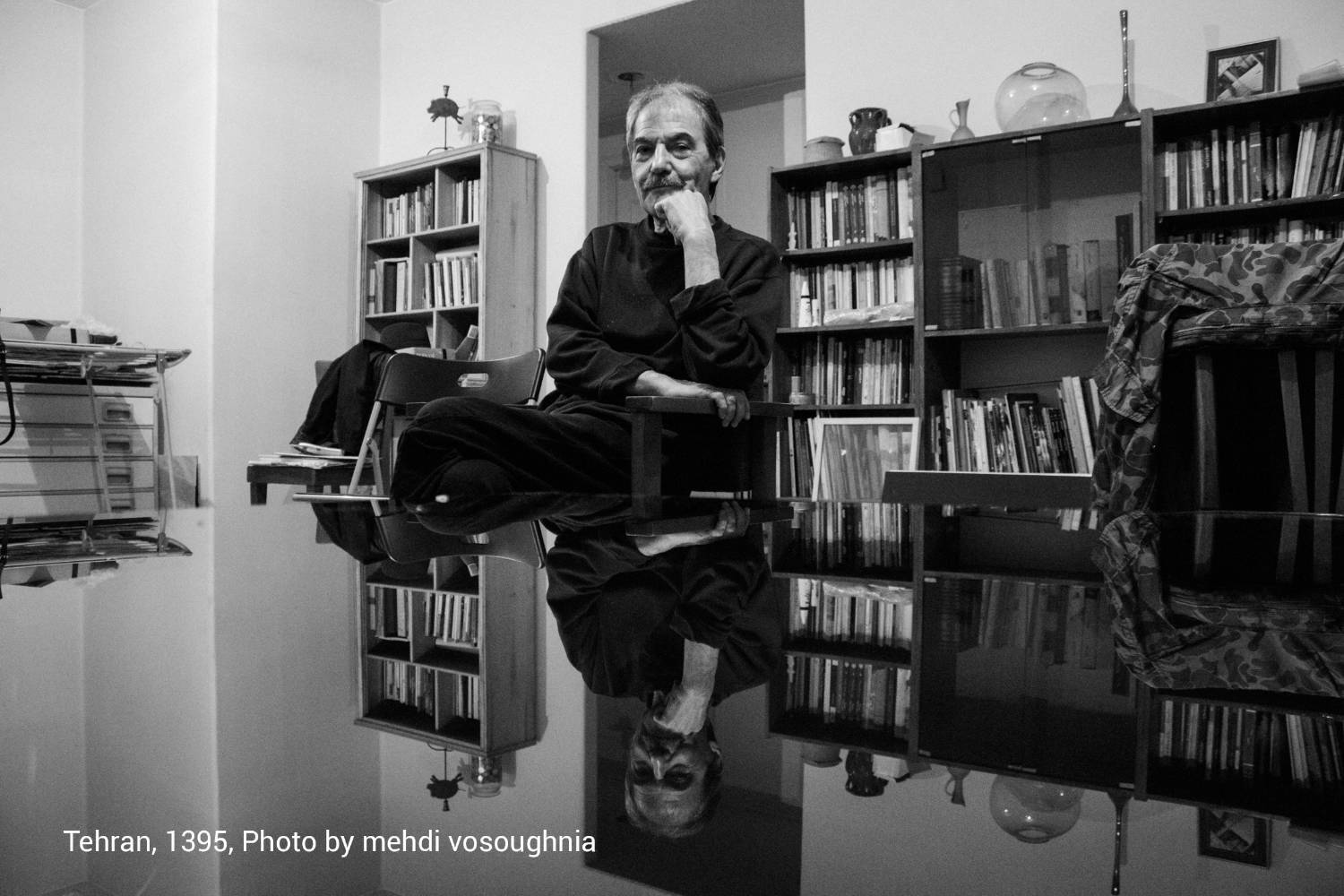
- Born: 1 January 1941; Tehran, Iran
- Died: 13 May 2026 (aged 85); New York, USA
- Citizenship: Iranian
- Education: University of Tehran; San Francisco Art Institute
- Occupations: Photographer, educator, writer

Yahya Dehghanpour (Persian: یحیی دهقان‌پور; 1 January 1941 – 13 May 2026) was an Iranian photographer, photography educator and writer known for his role in photography education in Iran.

== Early life and education ==
Dehghanpour was born in Tehran, Iran on 1 January 1941. He became interested in photography during childhood and purchased his first camera at the age of nine.

He studied Persian literature at the University of Tehran and graduated in 1970.

In 1972, he moved to the United Kingdom to study linguistics, but later shifted his focus to photography. He attended Grays Technical College and later studied photography at the Polytechnic of Central London before continuing his education in the United States.

Dehghanpour later studied at the San Francisco Art Institute, where he worked with photographers and educators including Jerry Burchard, Linda Connor, Jack Fulton, and Harry Bowers.

== Career ==
Dehghanpour returned to Iran in 1978 and began teaching photography at the School of Television and Cinema. He later taught at Alzahra University, the University of Tehran, Tehran University of Art, and Islamic Azad University.

He was known for his role in photography education in Iran and contributed to contemporary Iranian photography through teaching, workshops, exhibitions, and photography criticism sessions.

His documentary photography included images of neighborhoods in Tehran such as Shahpour and Oudlajan. He also participated in several solo and group exhibitions in Iran.

== Death ==
Dehghanpour died on 13 May 2026, at the age of 85. A memorial ceremony for Dehghanpour was held in Tehran in May 2026, attended by photographers, students, his family, and cultural figures.

== Publications ==
Selected publications by Dehghanpour include:

- Five Views to Earth (1982)
- Iran, Another View (1991)
- Foothills (1993)
- Kish (2000s)
- They Planted Him in the Garden (2014)
- The Third Apple (2018)
- A Revolution in Pictures (2026)
