= Akbar Ahmadpour =

Iranian politician (1955–2025)

- اکبر احمدپور

Member of the Parliament of Iran for Khaf and Roshtkhar
- In office 27 May 2020 – 26 May 2024

Personal details
- Born: 1 August 1958; Khaf, Iran
- Died: 9 June 2025 (aged 66)
- Political party: Principlist
- Education: Ferdowsi University of Mashhad
- Occupation: Cleric

Akbar Ahmadpour (Persian: اکبر احمدپور; 1 August 1958 – 9 June 2025) was an Iranian politician. A member of the Iranian principlists, he served in the Parliament from 2020 to 2024.

Ahmadpour died on 9 June 2025, at the age of 66.
