= Maryam Hosseinian =

Iranian writer (1975–2025)

Hosseinian

Maryam Hosseinian (Persian: مریم حسینیان; 21 March 1975 – 1 August 2025) was an Iranian writer.

== Life and career ==
Hosseinian was born in Mashhad on 21 March 1975. She received a degree in Geotechnical engineering from Ferdowsi University of Mashhad and received a bachelor's degree in Persian language and literature from Payame Noor University of Mashhad. Throughout her career, she produced a number of books, including Maria Finger (2004).

Hosseinian died on 1 August 2025, at the age of 50.
