= Shahrzad Javaheri =

Iranian actress (1977–2026)

Shahrzad Javaheri (1977 – 13 June 2026) was an Iranian actress.

== Life and work ==
Javaheri was born in 1977 in Tehran. She is known for her roles in Iranian cinema, including Tatilat-e Doost Dashtani (2014) and Arezoohaye Shirin (2008).

She died on 13 June 2026, aged 49.
