= Mehrdad Falahatgar =

Iranian actor and director (1959–2025)

Mehrdad Falahatgar (Persian: مهرداد فلاحتگر; 1 October 1959 – 24 August 2025) was an Iranian actor and director.

== Life and career ==
Falahatgar was born 1 October 1959. Throughout his career, he acted in a number of feature films, including To Yek Alamat Soale Bozorgi (2015), The Glass Agency (1998). He also directed Shahre Ordibehesht (2018).

Falahatgar died of cancer on 24 August 2025, at the age of 65.
