= Murder of Elaheh Hosseinnejad =

2025 murder in Iran

Elaheh Hosseinnejad
- Born: October 18, 2000; Eslamshahr, Iran
- Disappeared: 25 May 2025; Namaz Square, Eslamshahr
- Died: May 25, 2025 (aged 24); Eslamshahr, Iran
- Cause of death: Murder by stabbing (four chest wounds)
- Body discovered: 4 June 2025
- Education: Bachelor's degree in Accounting
- Occupations: Beauty salon worker (nail and eyelash technician)
- Known for: Her disappearance and murder in 2025

Elaheh Hosseinnejad (Persian: الهه حسین‌نژاد; October 18, 2000 – May 25, 2025) was an Iranian woman whose disappearance and murder received widespread media attention and sparked public debate in Iran. A resident of Eslamshahr and a beauty technician in Tehran, Hosseinnejad went missing on May 25, 2025, after leaving work to assist her family. Her case gained national prominence amid growing concern over violence against women. On June 4, 2025, authorities confirmed the discovery of her body and the arrest of a suspect.

== Life ==
Elaheh Hosseinnejad was the daughter of Mohammad Hosseinnejad and originally from Sarab, a city in East Azerbaijan Province. She was 24 years old at the time of her disappearance and was employed as a nail and eyelash technician at a beauty salon in Tehran, working alongside her sister. She held a bachelor's degree in accounting.

According to her uncle, Elaheh was described as a "calm, responsible, and family-oriented girl."

She was known to support the Women, Life, Freedom movement, as well as dissident musicians such as Toomaj Salehi and Mehdi Yarrahi. She also opposed the enforcement of mandatory hijab in Iran.

== Disappearance ==
On May 25, 2025, Elaheh Hosseinnejad disappeared while returning home from her workplace in Tehran. She was last seen on her usual route between Shahrak-e Gharb and her residence in Eslamshahr. Her family reported her missing after she failed to arrive home.

According to reports, she left work at her usual time, intending to return home early at her mother's request to care for her disabled brother. Her last known contact was a phone call to her father at 7:40 PM, during which she said she was at Namaz Square in Eslamshahr and would be home within 20 minutes. No further contact was made.

Shortly after her disappearance, a video circulated on social media allegedly showing the moment of her abduction. However, it was later revealed that the footage was unrelated, originating from a 2018 abduction case in Tabriz involving an 18-year-old girl.

== Murder ==
Following the report of her disappearance, Iranian law enforcement began an investigation. Authorities announced that all available resources had been deployed to locate Elaheh Hosseinnejad.

On the morning of June 4, 2025, the Tehran Prosecutor's Office reported that Hosseinnejad's body had been found in a desert area near Tehran and that a suspect had been arrested. Two suspects were taken into custody on June 4.

According to the judiciary-affiliated news agency Mizan, on the day of the incident, Hosseinnejad boarded a silver Samand sedan. The driver allegedly had malicious intent, and upon her resistance, stabbed her twice in the chest and left her body in a desert on the outskirts of Tehran.

Initially, Mizan stated that the suspect intended to sexually assault the victim. Later reports, however, changed the motive to robbery.

The forensic medical examiner stated that any conclusion regarding possible sexual assault would depend on specialized examinations and test results. The Tehran prosecutor promised expedited handling of the case.

During the first court session on July 28, 2025, the family's lawyer stated that Elaheh was still alive when her body was abandoned in the desert.

=== Motive ===
In the early days after the murder, Iranian police and some state-affiliated news outlets claimed the motive behind Hosseinnejad's murder was the theft of her mobile phone. However, the official narrative gradually shifted, and state-controlled media began questioning the robbery theory. Fars News Agency, affiliated with the Islamic Revolutionary Guard Corps (IRGC), cited video footage of the suspect's confession and reported that he had withdrawn his claim of robbery. They also noted that the victim's gold jewelry had not been stolen, further casting doubt on robbery as a motive.

In a video confession released on June 8, 2025, the suspect, Bahman Farzaneh, stated that his motive stemmed from a confrontation over Hosseinnejad's clothing and behavior. In the video, Farzaneh repeatedly refers to the victim as "shameless," saying, "She was too shameless... her sin fell on me… it was her destiny." In another part, responding to a Turkish-speaking interrogator, he says: "Let me tell you something… she was very shameless. It was her fate for her sin to fall on me. I wish she was from my own family."

Farzaneh also denied any financial motive, stating, "I threw the phone on the highway. What would I do with a phone? Even if I had 100 million tomans, nobody would buy it for 1 million. I didn't need it." He insisted that money played no role in the crime.

The confession video showed interrogators using an empathetic tone to elicit more information. At times, off-camera voices were heard approving the suspect's statements with phrases like "You did the right thing," or "She deserved it."

Some state-affiliated media, including Iran Newspaper, focused on the suspect's personal background rather than the victim. Notably, a public statement by the ride-hailing company Snapp denying the suspect's affiliation was later removed, and state-affiliated sources began calling for surveillance equipment to be installed in vehicles, though the source of the interrogation footage remains unclear.

== Perpetrator ==
The suspect, Bahman Farzaneh, was originally from Meshginshahr and was reportedly in the process of divorcing his wife. After moving to Tehran, he began working informally as a rideshare driver using his brother's car. He reportedly spent his nights sleeping in the vehicle or in local teahouses.

== Burial ==
Elaheh Hosseinnejad was buried on the evening of June 5, 2025, in Dar al-Salam Cemetery in Eslamshahr. Her funeral was attended by a large number of locals and her family.

== Timeline ==
May 25 – Elaheh disappeared after leaving work in Shahrak-e Gharb, Tehran.

May 27 – Her family reported her missing; official inquiries yielded no leads.

May 28 – Social media users began circulating her photo and calling for answers.

May 31 – Judiciary-affiliated Mizan reported a legal case had been opened.

June 1 – Police confirmed the Intelligence Department was now involved; her uncle reported that CCTV footage had mysteriously gone missing.

June 4

- 9:08 AM – Mizan announces a suspect has been arrested, referring to him directly as "the killer".
- 9:59 AM – Hosseinnejad's body is reported found; police mention "malicious intent".
- 10:09 AM – Video of the masked suspect is published.
- 10:24 AM – Tehran prosecutor confirms the case is being fast-tracked.
- 11:53 AM – Footage of the suspect's arrest and discovery of the body is released.
- 12:30 PM – Further video shows the suspect with the head of the police's criminal investigations unit.
- 7:25 PM – Mizan issues a statement denying any official report of sexual assault, calling such reports "rumors"

June 8 A 2.5-minute video of the suspect's confession is released. Fars News casts doubt on the robbery motive.

== Controversies and Public Doubts ==
=== Missing CCTV Footage ===
Namaz Square and nearby areas are densely monitored. The lack of footage showing Hosseinnejad boarding the vehicle raised questions.

=== Concealment of Suspect's Identity ===
Unlike in other cases, the suspect's face was obscured by dual masks. This unusual treatment was widely criticized.

=== Conflicting Motives ===
Initial claims referenced robbery; later reports suggested attempted sexual assault, and eventually, a confrontation over behavior and appearance. These shifts, along with online activity linked to the suspect, led to suspicions of ideological motives.

=== Body Discovery Location ===
Initial police reports cited the vicinity of Mehrabad Airport. Later videos indicated an entirely different area: Shamsabad Industrial Zone in south Tehran, far from the first location.

=== Ride-hailing Employment ===
Authorities confirmed that the suspect had previously worked with Snapp. While officials stated the murder occurred outside the platform, questions arose about vetting drivers with criminal backgrounds.

=== Government Criticism ===
Widespread criticism on social media targeted the Iranian authorities for systemic discrimination and failure to protect women. Users noted the contradiction between the regime's facial recognition efforts to enforce hijab and the 11-day delay in tracking a missing woman.

== Social Activism ==
On her Instagram page, Hosseinnejad had posted stories supporting dissident artists and the "Women, Life, Freedom" movement. She had also expressed opposition to the execution of Mohammad Hosseini, a protester arrested in the 2022–2023 protests.

== Similar Cases ==
Hosseinnejad's case was compared to that of Samaa Jahanbaz, a 22-year-old woman who went missing in Shiraz in 2022. Both cases involved young women who disappeared under unclear circumstances and drew public attention.

== Reactions ==
=== Politicians ===
- Zahra Pezeshkian, representing President Masoud Pezeshkian, met with Hosseinnejad's family on June 7 and conveyed the president's condolences.
- Narges Mohammadi, imprisoned Nobel Peace Prize laureate, wrote: "Elaheh was not killed merely on the road from Tehran to Eslamshahr—but on a path paved by state violence against women across Iran."
- Reza Pahlavi, Iranian crown prince in exile, blamed the Islamic Republic: "As long as this regime promotes political violence and normalizes misogyny, no Iranian woman will be safe."
- Hossein Ronaghi criticized the regime's focus on enforcing hijab over public safety.
- Masih Alinejad questioned how a woman could vanish under numerous city cameras, yet no trace was found.
- Nazanin Boniadi stated: "This regime is not blind - it is complicit in every honor killing and every cover-up."
- Saeed Ohadi, head of the Martyrs Foundation, dismissed the outrage as media exaggeration.

=== Athletes ===
- Rasoul Khadem linked Hosseinnejad's murder with that of Amir Mohammad Khaleghi, calling both victims of a wounded nation.
- Mohammad Khodabandelou, a footballer for Persepolis FC, visited her family on June 6. Elaheh was known to support the team.
- The Persepolis Club posted a tribute to her on Instagram.
- Voria Ghafouri wrote that the murder reflected deep social and psychological problems in Iranian society.
- Nahid Kiani, taekwondo champion, posted on Instagram: "90 million Iranians are wounded."

=== Artists and Celebrities ===
Numerous actors, musicians, and public figures shared tributes on social media. Singer Alireza Ghorbani paid tribute to Elaheh during a live concert on June 5.

== See also ==
- Women's rights in Iran
- Femicide in Iran
