= Bemani, Iran =

Bemani بماني
- Village
- Location within Iran
- Coordinates: 26°48′26″N 57°03′40″E
- Country: Iran
- Province: Hormozgan
- County: Minab
- Bakhsh: Byaban
- Rural District: Bemani

Population (2006)
  - Total: 714
- Time zone: UTC+3:30 (IRST)
  - Summer (DST): UTC+4:30 (IRDT)

Bemani (Persian: بماني, also Romanized as Bemānī) is a village in Bemani Rural District, Byaban District, Minab County, Hormozgan Province, Iran. At the 2006 census, its population was 714, in 131 families.
