= List of equipment of the Qatar Armed Forces =

This is a list of equipment used by the Qatar Armed Forces.

== Qatari Emiri Land Force ==
=== Armoured vehicles ===
Model	Image	Origin	Type	Quantity	Notes
Armoured fighting vehicles
Leopard 2A7+		Germany	Main battle tank	62	
Altay		South Korea; Turkey (licence)	Main battle tank	0	100 on order.
Piranha II 90mm		Switzerland; United Kingdom; Belgium	Tank destroyer	36	40 Piranha II designed by Mowag, manufactured by Alvis PLC, 36 of which were armed with a CCTS-90 turret from John Cockerill.
Boxer - RCT-30		Germany; Netherlands	Infantry fighting vehicle	6	A total of 10 Boxer of this type were ordered by Qatar. The first was delivered in December 2025, 6 were delivered by the end of January 2026.
AMX-10P		France	Infantry fighting vehicles	40	
AMX-10RC		France	Armoured reconnaissance vehicle	12	
Fennek		Germany; Netherlands	Armoured reconnaissance vehicle	32	
Personnel carriers
AMX-VCI		France	Armoured personnel carrier	30	
VAB		France	Armoured personnel carrier	180	VAB purchased in 1982, and modernised in the 2010s. They are equipped with: Aselsan SARP RCWS
V-150 Chaimite		United States	Armoured personnel carrier	8	
Ejder Yalcin		Turkey	MRAP infantry mobility vehicle	342	Order announced in March 2018 (DIMDEX 2018). They are equipped with SARP-DUAL RCWS.
Kirpi-2		Turkey	MRAP infantry mobility vehicle	50	50 ordered in 2018.
RG-31		South Africa	MRAP infantry mobility vehicle	–	
BMC Amazon	UA Marines BMC Kirpi	Turkey	MRAP infantry mobility vehicle	35	
NMS		Turkey	MRAP infantry mobility vehicle	214	
Dingo 2		Germany	MRAP infantry mobility vehicle	14	
VBL		France	Infantry mobility vehicle	16	

=== Engineering & Maintenance vehicles ===
Model	Image	Origin	Type	Quantity	Notes
WiSENT 2 AEV		Germany	Armoured engineering vehicle	6	
Piranha		Switzerland	Armoured recovery vehicle	4	
AMX-30D		France	Armoured recovery vehicle	1	

=== Fire support/Artillery ===
==== Ballistic missiles ====
Model	Image	Origin	Type	Quantity	Notes
Ballistic missiles
SY-400	–	China	Short-range ballistic missile launch system	12 - 18 (estimate)	Weapons: BP-12A

==== Rocket artillery ====
Model	Image	Origin	Type	Quantity	Notes
BM-21 Grad 122 mm		Soviet Union	Multiple rocket launcher	3	
Astros II MLRS		Brazil	Multiple rocket launcher	6	Weapons: SS-30 missile (127 mm); SS-40 missile (180 mm)
M142 HIMARS		United States	Multiple rocket launcher	7	Purchased in December 2012, when Qatar notified the United States of a possible Foreign Military Sale of 7 M142 HIMARS systems. Weapons: 60 M57 Block 1A T2K unitary rockets; 30 × 6 M31A1 GMLRS unitary rockets

==== Howitzers ====
Model	Image	Origin	Type	Calibre	Quantity	Notes
RCH 155		Germany	Self-propelled howitzer	155 mm NATO; L/52	0	Swap of 12 RCH 155 in exchange of 12 PzH2000 in service with the army.
Panzerhaubitze 2000		Germany	Self-propelled howitzer	155 mm NATO; L/52	24	12 to be transferred to Germany, in exchange of 12 RCH 155 based on the Boxer AFV platform.
AMX F3		France	Self-propelled howitzer	155 mm L/33	22	
G5 155 mm		South Africa	Towed howitzer	155 mm L/45	12	

==== Mortars ====
Model	Image	Origin	Type	Calibre	Quantity	Notes
MO-120RT	(illustration)	France	Heavy mortar	120 mm	200	
L16 81 mm		United Kingdom; Canada	Infantry mortar	81 mm	30	
Brandt 60 mm LR	–	France	Infantry mortar	60 mm	15	

=== Air-defence ===
Model	Image	Origin	Type	Quantity (fire units)	Notes
Anti-ballistic missile air defence system
THAAD		United States	Anti-ballistic surface-to-air missile system	Not announced	Missile system ordered in 2025. Equipment: AN/TPY-2 (with cooling and power units); THAAD command and control center; Launchers
Medium range air defence system
Patriot PAC-3		United States	Medium-range surface-to-air missile system	11	Ordered through a foreign military sale: 11 × AN/MPQ65 target acquisition radars; 11 × N/MSQ-132 Engagement Control Systems; 44 × M902 Launching Stations; 30 × OE-349 Antenna Mast Groups; 246 × MIM-104E PAC-2 GEM-T missiles
NASAMS 2		Norway; United States	Medium-range surface-to-air missile system	10	Equipment: 10 × Kongsberg Fire Distribution Center; 10 × AN/MPQ-64F1 Improved Sentinel; 40 × launchers: Standard launchers, or; High Mobility Launchers based on a UNIMOG platform; AMRAAM-ER
Short range air defence system
Rapier		United Kingdom	Short-range surface-to-air missile system	6	Systems ordered in 1981, entered service in 1983. Equipment: 6 × Blindfire radars; 18 × launchers; 250 × Rapiers-1 missiles
Roland		France; Germany	Short-range surface-to-air missile system	9	In 1986 Qatar ordered: 3 × self-propelled Roland 2, based on the AMX-30R chassis; 3 × self-propelled Roland 2 systems; 6 × Roland 2 based on shelters; 200 × Roland missiles

==== Man portable anti-air missiles ====
Model	Image	Origin	Type	Quantity		Notes
Model	Image	Origin	Type	Launchers	Missiles	Notes
Blowpipe		United Kingdom	Man-portable air-defense system	6	50	
Mistral		France	Man-portable air-defense system	24	600	
Stinger		United States	Man-portable air-defense system	12	60	

==== Air defence cannons ====
Model	Image	Origin	Type	Calibre	Quantity	Notes
KORKUT	–	Turkey	SPAAG (Self-propelled anti-aircraft gun)	2 × 35×228mm	0	15 in total were ordered.

=== Small arms ===
- Anti-tank weapons:
  - 40 × Carl Gustav M2-550 recoilless rifles (84mm)
  - Bofors AT4 CS
  - Swingfire ATGM
  - MBDA HOT ATGM: 48 × launchers, 1,000 × missiles
  - MBDA MILAN ATGM: 100 × launchers, 630 × missiles
  - 9M133 Kornet ATGM: 400 × launchers, 5,000 × missiles on order
  - FGM-148 Javelin ATGM: 50 × CLU, 500 400 × missiles on order
- Grenade launchers:
  - 200 × M203-PI
- Machine guns:
  - M2 Browning
  - FN MAG
  - FN Minimi
  - Heckler & Koch HK21
- Assault rifles:
  - 3,000 × Colt CAR-15A1
  - 3,000 × M16 A1
  - FN SCAR
  - FN FAL
  - HK417
  - Valmet M62
  - Valmet M76
  - AK-47
  - AK-103
  - AKM
- Carabines:
  - 100 × M4 carbine
- Precision rifles:
  - Barrett M82A1
  - HK417
- Submachine guns
  - Heckler & Koch MP5A3
  - Sterling MK-IV\L2A3
- Pistols:
  - Heckler & Koch HK4
  - SIG Sauer P226
  - Smith & Wesson Model 10
- Pump-action shotgun
  - Mossberg Model-700

== Sources ==
- International Institute for Strategic Studies (12 February 2025). The Military Balance 2025. London: Routledge. ISBN 978-1-003-63076-0.
