= Afsaneh Malek =

Iranian singer (1942–2026)

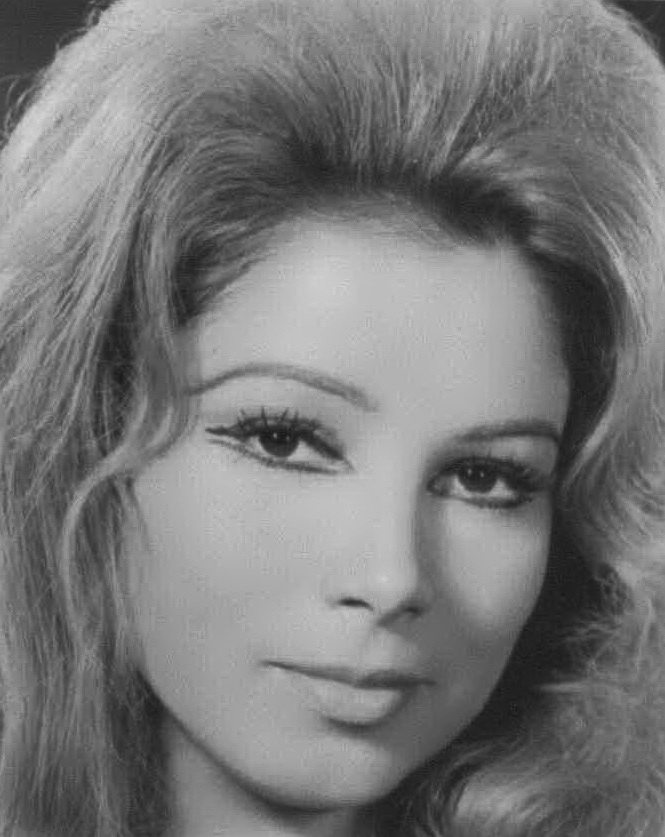
Afsaneh Malek

Afsaneh Malek (Persian: افسانه ملک; December 1942 – 16 June 2026) was an Iranian singer.

== Life and career ==
Prior to the 1979 Revolution, Malek had performed hundreds of times, notably collaborating with the Faramarz Payvar Orchestra, Simin Agharazi, and Ophelia Parto.

Her last performance was at the Niavaran Cultural Center in October 2017.

Malek died on 16 June 2026, at the age of 83.
