= Saeed Mozaffari =

Iranian dubbing director and voice actor (1942–2025)

- سعید مظفری
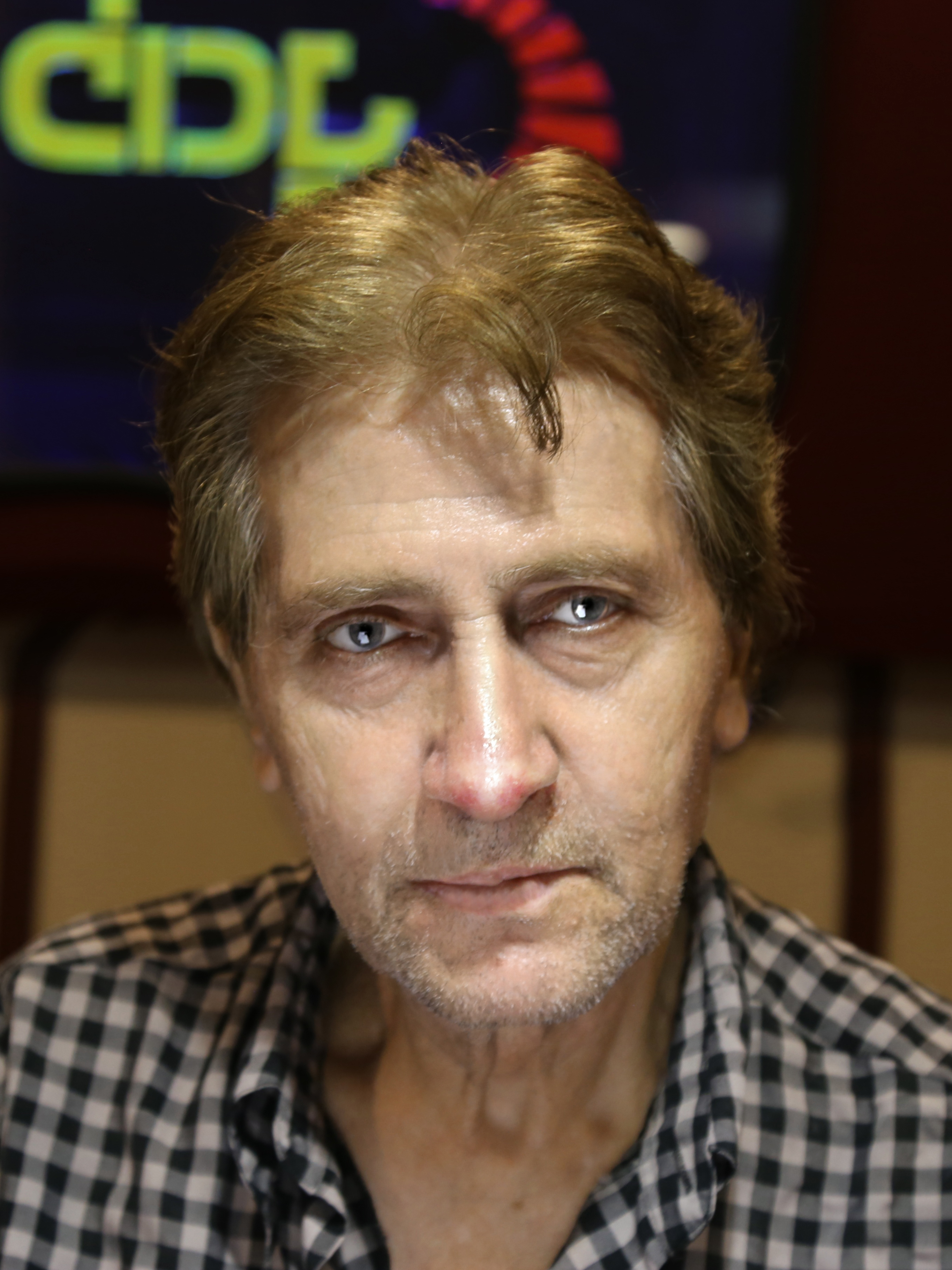
- Mozaffari in 2017
- Born: 10 August 1942; Shahrud, Iran
- Died: 14 October 2025 (aged 83); Tehran, Iran
- Occupation: Voice actor
- Years active: 1962–2025
- Notable work: Voices for Brad Pitt and Jackie Chan
- Children: 1

Saeed Mozaffari (Persian: سعید مظفری, 10 August 1942 – 14 October 2025) was an Iranian dubbing director and voice actor. Most of his dubbing is with Brad Pitt and Jackie Chan.

== Biography ==
Mozaffari started working in the field of dubbing around 1962.

Mozaffari died from a cardiac arrest on 14 October 2025, at the age of 83.
