= Heydar Abbasi =

Iranian writer and translator (1943–2026)

- Born: 22 April 1943 Maragheh, Iran
- Died: 29 April 2026 (aged 83)
- Occupation: Poet; translator; writer

Heydar Abbasi (Persian: حیدر عباسی; 22 April 1943 – 29 April 2026), mainly known by his pen name Barişmaz (باریشماز), was an Iranian poet, translator, writer and literary critic of Azerbaijani literature.

== Background ==
Abbasi was born in Maragheh, East Azerbaijan on 22 April 1943. He graduated from the University of Tabriz and later completed his postgraduate studies in Tehran. Abbasi died on 29 April 2026, at the age of 83.

== Works ==
The best known work is the translated Nahj al-Balagha to Azerbaijani language by Arabic alphabet and Latin, also Masnavi to Azerbaijani language by Arabic alphabet and other works are as follows.

- Nəğmə Daği və Istimar
- Kəbə və qanli azan
- Güləndə hərzaman Məşair və şeytan
- Səs
- Duvarlar
- Ödümlü Dirək
- Çağirilmamiş qonaqlar
- Müxannaslər
- Val- əsr
- Dartilmamiş dənlər
