= Public Institution for Social Security Fund =

Public pension fund of Kuwait

Public Institution For Social Security Fund
- المؤسسة العامة للتأمينات الاجتماعية
- Formation: 1976
- Headquarters: Kuwait City, Kuwait
- Director general: Meshal Al-Othman
- Website: www.pifss.gov.kw

The Public Institution For Social Security (PIFSS; Arabic: المؤسسة العامة للتأمينات الاجتماعية) is the public pension fund of the state of Kuwait. It was founded in 1976 and counts 11 subsidiaries and 45 documented transactions. In 2021, its cash reserves accounted to 4% of its investments down from 11.5% in 2020.

The current worth of the assets of the PIFSS is estimated at $134 billion. It recorded its best ever annual performance year in 2021, recording a 20.9% growth in its assets.

In 2026 the main branch of PIFSS has been struck by Iran in its retaliation strikes.

== Investments ==
The pension fund owns 25% of the U.S. private equity firm Stone Point Capital, 25% of Oak Hill Advisors and 10% of TowerBrook Capital Partners.
