= Habibollah Sayyari =

Iranian commodore

Amir Habibollah Sayyari
- حبیب‌الله سیاری
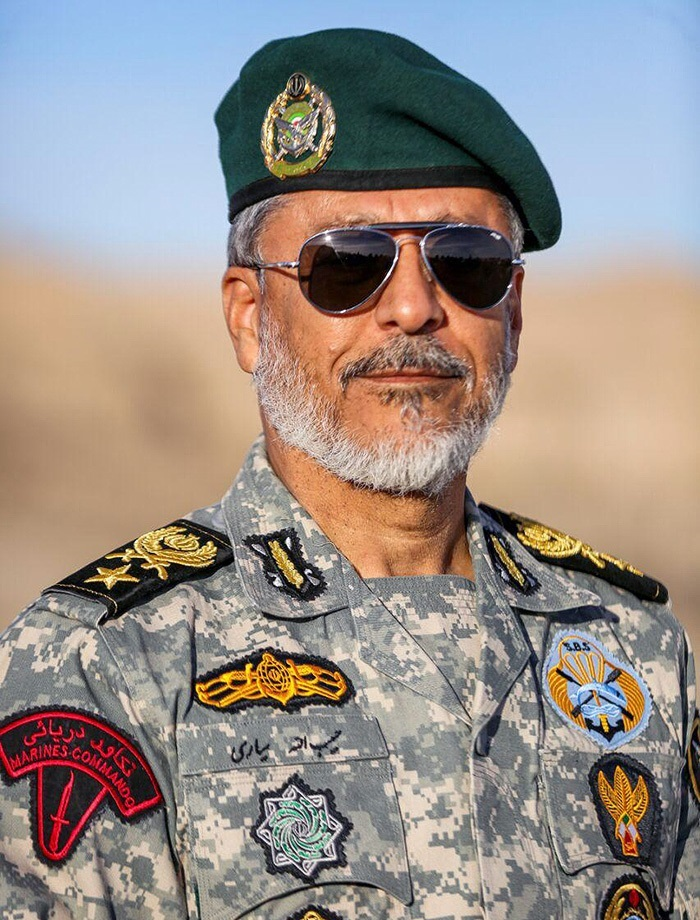
- Habibollah Sayyari in 2018

Acting Chief of the General Staff of the Iranian Armed Forces
- In office 13 June 2025 – 13 June 2025
- President: Masoud Pezeshkian
- Supreme Leader: Ali Khamenei
- Preceded by: Mohammad Bagheri
- Succeeded by: Abdolrahim Mousavi

Coordinating Deputy of the Islamic Republic of Iran Army
- Incumbent
- Assumed office 5 November 2017
- President: Hassan Rouhani; Ebrahim Raisi; Mohammad Mokhber (acting); Masoud Pezeshkian
- Supreme Leader: Ali Khamenei; Mojtaba Khamenei
- Preceded by: Mohammad-Hossein Dadras

Commander of the Iranian Navy
- In office 29 August 2007 – 5 November 2017
- President: Mahmoud Ahmadinejad; Hassan Rouhani
- Supreme Leader: Ali Khamenei
- Preceded by: Sajjad Kouchaki
- Succeeded by: Hossein Khanzadi

Deputy Commander of the Iranian Navy
- In office 2005–2007
- President: Mohammad Khatami; Mahmoud Ahmadinejad
- Supreme Leader: Ali Khamenei
- Preceded by: Mohammad Hossein Shafiei
- Succeeded by: Gholamreza Khadem Bigham

Deputy for Operational and Combat Support Affairs, Joint Chiefs of Staff of the Artesh
- In office 2003–2005
- President: Mohammad Khatami
- Supreme Leader: Ali Khamenei
- Preceded by: ?
- Succeeded by: Mohammad Mahmoudi

Deputy Coordinating Deputy of the Artesh
- In office 2000–2003
- President: Mohammad Khatami
- Supreme Leader: Ali Khamenei
- Preceded by: Akbar Fasihi
- Succeeded by: ?

Personal details
- Born: 10 January 1956 Now Bandegan Fasa County, Fars province, Pahlavi Iran
- Education: University of Command and Staff; Supreme National Defense University
- Awards: Order of Fath (1st grade); Order of Merit and Management (2nd grade)

Military service
- Allegiance: Pahlavi Iran (1974–1979); Iran (1979–present)
- Branch/service: Navy
- Years of service: 1974–present
- Rank: Commodore
- Commands: Northern Fleet (1998–1999); Deputy Commander of the 1st Naval District (1995–1998); 1st Marine Brigade
- Battles/wars: Iran–Iraq War; First Battle of Khorramshahr; Siege of Abadan; Operation Morvarid; Operation Samen-ol-A'emeh (WIA); Second Battle of Khorramshahr; Twelve-Day War; 2026 Iran war

Habibollah Sayyari (Persian: حبیب‌الله سیاری, born 1955) is an Iranian military officer who briefly served as Acting Chief of Staff of the Islamic Republic of Iran Armed Forces in June 2025. He previously served as Commander of the Islamic Republic of Iran Navy.

On 13 June 2025, following Israeli strikes on Iran, he was appointed to the role by order of the Supreme Leader, replacing Mohammad Bagheri, but was replaced shortly thereafter by Abdolrahim Mousavi.

He is a former marine commando who fought in the Iran–Iraq War.

== Early life ==
Habibollah Sayyari was born in January 1956 in Now Bandegan, Fasa County, Fars province.

== Military service ==
Commodore Habibollah Sayyari was commissioned in the Artesh in 1974 and served in Imperial Iran Navy prior to the Revolution. Sayyari completed advanced Green Beret (Kolah Sabzi) Studies, at the Command and Staff College (DAFOS), and Strategic Sciences courses at the Supreme National Defense University. Sayyari saw combat during the Iran–Iraq War as a Naval Commando. He was part of the Bushehr Marine Rangers Battalion during the famed First Battle of Khorramshahr and was wounded in the battle. He also participated in Operation Morvarid and was seriously wounded by a mortar shell during Operation Samen-ol-A'emeh.

Habibollah Sayyari has served as the Commander of the 1st Marine Rifle Brigade; Commander of the Manjil Marine Commando Training Center, Deputy IRIN 1st Naval District Commander, IRIN 4th Naval District Commander and he has also served staff tours as the Assistant Deputy Coordinator, Military Advisor, Deputy of Administrative Affairs for Combat Services Support, Artesh Joint Staff Headquarters; IRIN Deputy Commander from 2005 to 2007; IRIN Commander 2007–2017.

== Responsibilities of Habibollah Sayyari ==
Habibollah Sayyari has held numerous key positions throughout his military career. Initially, he served in several important command roles, such as Commander of Marine Corps Training in Manjil, Commander of the 1st Marine Brigade in Bandar Abbas, Deputy Commander of the 1st Naval District (NEDAJA), and Commander of the Naval Training Center in Rasht and the 4th Naval District (NEDAJA).

Sayyari was later transferred to the Joint Chiefs of Staff of the Army, where he served as the Deputy Coordinating Deputy and Deputy for Operational and Combat Support Affairs. In 2005, he returned to NEDAJA and served as Deputy Commander of the Navy until 2007, after which he took on the role of Commander of the Navy, a position he held for a decade until 2017.

Since November 2017, Sayyari has been serving as the Coordinating Deputy of the Commander-in-Chief of the Army and the Chief of the Joint Chiefs of Staff of the Army. Currently, his military rank is Commodore (Naval equivalent of Brigadier General).

== Habibollah Sayyari's Background ==
1. Commander of Marine Corps Training, Manjil
2. Commander of the 1st Marine Brigade, Bandar Abbas
3. Deputy Commander of the 1st Naval District, Navy of the Islamic Republic of Iran (NEDAJA) (1995–1998)
4. Commander of the Naval Training Center, Rasht
5. Commander of the 4th Naval District, NEDAJA (1998–1999)
6. Deputy Coordinating Deputy of the Army (2000–2003)
7. Deputy for Operational and Combat Support Affairs, Joint Chiefs of Staff of the Army (2003–2005)
8. Deputy Commander of the Navy (2005–2007)
9. Commander of the Navy (2007–2017)
10. Coordinating Deputy of the Commander-in-Chief of the Army (Chief of the Joint Chiefs of Staff) (2017–present)

Military offices
Preceded by Mohammad-Hossein Dadras	Coordinating Deputy of the Islamic Republic of Iran Army; 5 November 2017–present	Incumbent
Preceded by Sajjad Kouchaki	Commander of the Islamic Republic of Iran Navy; 20 August 2007–5 November 2017	Succeeded by Hossein Khanzadi
