= Jameh Mosque of Khorramshahr =

Mosque in Khorramshahr, Khuzestan province, Iran

- مسجد جامع خرمشهر
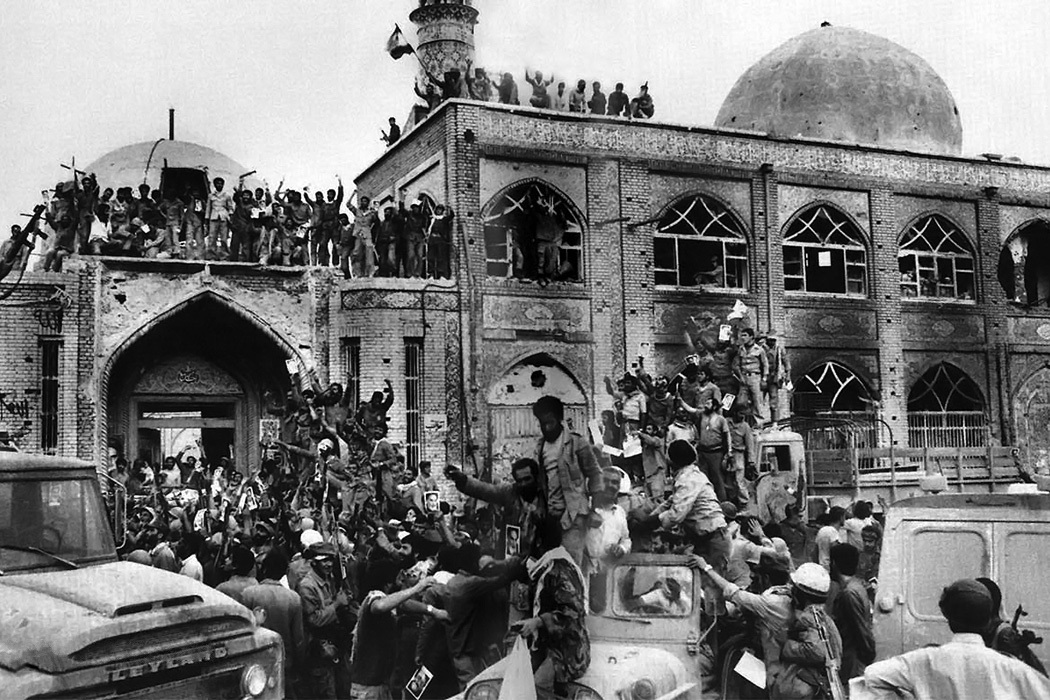
- The mosque during the 1982 liberation of Khorramshahr

- Location of the mosque in Iran

Religion
- Affiliation: Shia Islam
- Ecclesiastical or organisational status: Friday mosque
- Status: Active

Location
- Location: Khorramshahr, Khuzestan
- Country: Iran
- Coordinates: 31°05′00″N 48°22′10″E

Architecture
- Type: Mosque architecture
- Style: Safavid

Specifications
- Dome: One (maybe more)
- Minaret: Two
- Minaret height: 28 m (92 ft)

Iran National Heritage List
- Official name: Jameh Mosque of Khorramshahr
- Type: Built
- Designated: 2011
- Reference no.: 30000
- Conservation organization: Cultural Heritage, Handicrafts and Tourism Organization of Iran

The Jameh Mosque of Khorramshahr (Persian: مسجد جامع خرمشهر, romanized: Masjid-e-Jāmeh Khorramshahr), also known as the Khorramshahr Central Mosque, is a Shi'ite Friday mosque, located in Khorramshahr city, within Khorramshahr County of the province of Khuzestan, Iran.

== Overview ==
The mosque was partially destroyed in the 1982 Battle of Khorramshahr, during the Iran–Iraq War. As one of the most famous and symbolically important buildings in Khorramshahr, it was a place of celebration after the city was liberated on 24 May 1982. During the war, it was the center of command and logistics for the city's defenders.

The Jameh Mosque of Khorramshahr is the thirty thousandth historical monument of Iran, which was registered in the list of national monuments in 2011.

== History and specifications ==
Jameh Mosque of Khorramshahr is more than 120 years old, and its founder is unknown. Its mosque was contained within 1,209 square metres (13,010 sq ft), of which 40 percent was destroyed in Iran-Iraq War. When the Khorramshahr Mosque was rebuilt after the war, 4,000 square metres (43,000 sq ft) was added to mosque from the north side for facilities such as a guesthouse for pilgrims and a pedestrian passageway, as well as a commercial site. In 1969, land from the west side was added to the mosque and the mosque was renovated.

It has two finials and two small and large domes, over 120 years old, and 770 square metres (8,300 sq ft) of mosaic tile is a special feature of this monument. This old mosque has a brick facade. The mosque has approximately 1,000 square metres (11,000 sq ft) of adobe tiles which the verses of the Quran are written. It has two finials with a height of 28 metres (92 ft) from the ground floor and two large and small domes. An air conditioning and central cooling system were installed.

== See also ==
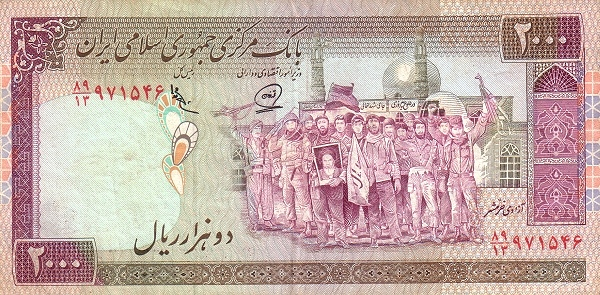
An IRR 2000 note, with Iranian warriors after the Khorramshahr Liberation, with the mosque in the background.

- Persian domes
- Iran–Iraq War
  - Battle of Khorramshahr
  - Liberation of Khorramshahr
- Shia Islam in Iran
- List of mosques in Iran
