= Battle of Khorramshahr =

Battle of Khorramshahr may refer to two battles during the Iran–Iraq War:

- Battle of Khorramshahr (1980), the capture of Khorramshahr by Iraqi forces
- Battle of Khorramshahr (1982), the recapture of Khorramshahr by Iranian forces
