= Bushehr Marine Rangers Battalion =

Special forces of Iran

- Active: 1970s–present
- Country: Iran
- Branch: Navy
- Type: Naval infantry Commando; Special operations force
- Role: Amphibious warfare Special operations Direct action Unconventional warfare Special reconnaissance
- Part of: Islamic Republic of Iran Navy
- Equipment: 106mm Rifle; 61mm Mortar; BGM-71 TOW
- Engagements: Iran-Iraq War

Commanders
- Current commander: Hooshang Samadi

Bushehr Marine Rangers Battalion is one of the Iranian Navy's elite Marine units. The battalion rose to prominence during the Iran-Iraq War, where it had a significant operational role in the early months of the war and a prominent role in the Second Battle of Khorramshahr.

== Operation Morvarid ==
During the Operation Morvarid in Iran-Iraq War, the "Bushehr Marine Rangers Battalion" played a prominent role in capture and destruction of two Iraqi docks, "Al-Bakr" and "Al-Amiyah".

== Defending Khorramshahr ==
In Iran-Iraq War, "Boushehr Marine Rangers Battalion" arrived in Khorramshahr on 22 September 1980, with about 700 personnel. Khorramshahr was finally occupied by Iraqi Army on 26 October 1980, after 34 days of resistance and street fighting against those. In the morning of 26 October 1980, after helping people to evacuate the city, the "Boushehr Marine Rangers Battalion" personnel were the last to leave the city by boat. In the battle for defense of Khorramshahr, 300 people were injured and 76 were killed only from "Boushehr Marine Rangers Battalion" personnel.

== See also ==
- Operation Morvarid
- Hooshang Samadi
- Iran–Iraq War
- Liberation of Khorramshahr
- Battle of Khorramshahr
- Siege of Abadan
