= Shahram Irani =

Commander of the Iranian Navy

Amir Shahram Irani
- شهرام ایرانی
- Irani in 2022

Commander of the Iranian Navy
- Incumbent
- Assumed office 17 August 2021
- President: Ebrahim Raisi; Mohammad Mokhber (acting); Masoud Pezeshkian
- Supreme Leader: Ali Khamenei; Mojtaba Khamenei
- Preceded by: Hossein Khanzadi

Personal details
- Born: 1967 (age 58–59) Sanandaj, Pahlavi Iran
- Education: Naval University of Noshahr; University of Command and Staff

Military service
- Allegiance: Iran
- Branch/service: Islamic Republic of Iran Navy
- Years of service: 1985–present
- Rank: Commodore
- Commands: Islamic Republic of Iran Navy
- Battles/wars: Iran–Iraq War; Twelve-Day War; 2026 Iran war

Shahram Irani (Persian: شهرام ایرانی) is an Iranian military officer of Kurdish ethnicity and the current Commander of the Iranian Navy, appointed since 17 August 2021, replacing Hossein Khanzadi. Irani is also the first Sunni commander of a military branch in the Islamic Republic of Iran Army.

== Life ==
Shahram Irani was born in 1967 in the city of Sanandaj.

In 1985, he entered the Imam Khomeini Naval University of Noshahr. After graduating from the university with a degree in navigation and ship command, he went on to command various classes of light and heavy surface vessels, including gunboats, missile ships, support and troop transport ships, Alvand-class destroyers, and the Islamic Republic of Iran’s helicopter carrier Kharg.

He has commanded several of the Army’s major naval task force missions, including the Suez Canal passage in 2012 and multiple search and rescue operations. He has also served on the directing committees and as spokesperson for several major naval and Army joint exercises, including serving as spokesperson for the Joint Exercise Zolfaghar 99.

== Commander of Iranian Navy ==
=== Reactions ===
Following Ali Khamenei’s decree appointing Irani as commander of the Islamic Republic of Iran Navy in 2021, the appointment received widespread reactions from officials and members of the Sunni community. Seyyed Abbas Salehi the Minister of Culture and Islamic Guidance, welcomed the appointment, stating: “The Leader has opened one of the country’s deadlocked issues of governance.”

Faeq Rostami, a representative of Kurdistan province in the Assembly of Experts, stated that Irani’s appointment brought joy to Sunnis, particularly the people of Kurdistan and Sanandaj. Mohsen Fathi, head of the Assembly of Kurdistan Representatives, also stated that Shahram Irani’s appointment “demonstrates national-level trust in Sunnis.” Ali Motahari a former member of the Islamic Consultative Assembly, stated in a tweet that Shahram Irani’s appointment was a sign of Islamic unity.

=== 2026 Iran War ===
On 29 March 2026, during the Iran war, the Islamic Republic of Iran Navy (NEDAJA) claimed that Qader missiles targeted the USS Abraham Lincoln (CVN-72) and forced it to change position. Irani stated that the vessel’s movements were continuously monitored, adding that “once a hostile naval group enters the range of missile systems, it will be targeted by the Iranian Navy’s attacks.” Irani later claimed that NEDAJA had conducted seven missile operations targeting the USS Abraham Lincoln and that the United States was temporarily unable to deploy its aircraft.

Military offices
Preceded by Hossein Khanzadi	Commander of the Islamic Republic of Iran Navy; 17 August 2021–	Incumbent
