= Sattari (disambiguation) =

Sattari is an administrative division of Goa, India.

Sattari or Satari may also refer to:

== Places ==
- Sattari, Malda, a village in West Bengal, India
  - Sattari High School
- Satari, a peak in the Potosí mountain range, Bolivia

== Other uses ==
- Satari, character in List of The Bionic Woman episodes
- Satari on List of roof shapes
- Satari, a crown, see Lakshmi Kumara Thathachariar

== People with the surname Sattari ==
- Jalal Sattari (1931–2021), Iranologist, mythologist, writer, and translator
- Mansour Sattari (1945–1995), Commander of the Iranian Air Force
- Mohammad Sattari (b. 1993), footballer
- Sorena Sattari (b. 1972), scientist, inventor, and a vice president of Iran

== See also ==
- Sattar (disambiguation)
