= Karim Qavami =

Iranian retired military pilot

Amir Karim Qavami
- کریم قوامی
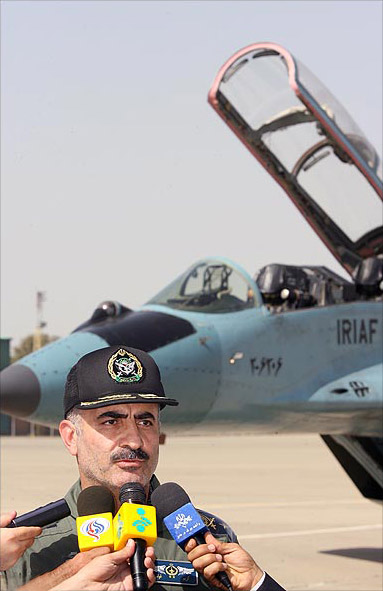
- Qavami in 2006
- Born: 1950 (age 75–76); Ardabil, Pahlavi Iran
- Alma mater: Iranian Officers' College
- Military career
- Allegiance: Pahlavi Iran (1965–1979); Iran (1979–present)
- Branch: Air Force
- Service years: 1975–present
- Rank: Brigadier General
- Commands: Deputy for Logistics, Support, and Industrial Research of the General Staff of the Armed Forces (2007–?); IRIA Air Force (2004–2006)
- Conflicts: Iran–Iraq War
- Awards: Order of Fath

Karim Qavami (Persian: کریم قوامی; born 1950 in Ardabil) was a Brigadier General, a pilot of the Northrop F-5 who served as the commander of the Islamic Republic of Iran Air Force from October 2004 to November 2006.

== Biography ==
He entered the Iranian Officers' College in 1970 and graduated in 1973 with the rank of Second lieutenant|second Lieutenant. That same year, he entered the Iranian Air Force Pilot School for a pilot course. After completing the preliminary flight training, he was sent abroad to complete a specialized flight course and succeeded in obtaining a fighter pilot's license by flying a training aircraft and a fighter jet.

He was a comrade-in-arms of Abbas Babaei, Mostafa Ardestani, Seyyed Alireza Yasini, and Mansour Sattari. During the 8-year Iran-Iraq War, he completed dozens of successful missions overseas, earning the Order of Fath.

Before assuming command of the Air Force, Qavami held the responsibilities of commanding flight battalions, Tabriz and Omidiyeh fighter bases, the Directorate of Inspection and Safety of Nahaja, and the command of the Mehrabad Air Region. In 2007, he became the deputy deputy for readiness, support, and industrial research at the General Staff of the Armed Forces.

Military offices
Preceded by Reza Pardis	Commander of Islamic Republic of Iran Army Air Force; 14 October 2004–27 October 2006	Succeeded by Ahmad Meyghani
