= Habib Baghaei =

Iranian retired military pilot

Amir Habib Baghaei
- حبیب بقایی
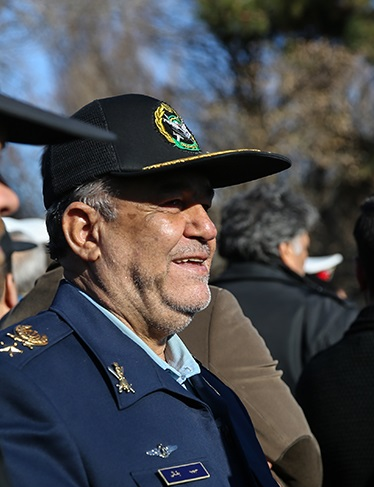
- Born: 31 May 1950; Shiraz, Pahlavi Iran
- Education: Iranian Officers' Academy
- Military career
- Allegiance: Pahlavi Iran (1975–1979); Iran (1979–present)
- Branch: Air Force
- Service years: 1975–present
- Rank: Brigadier General
- Commands: Deputy Commander-in-Chief of the Islamic Republic of Iran Army (2001–2005); IRIA Air Force (1994–2001); 4th Tactical Air Base (Dezful) (1987–1995); 5th Tactical Air Base (Omidieh) (1984–1987)
- Conflicts: Iran–Iraq War

Habib Baghaei (Persian: حبیب بقایی; born 31 May 1950 in Shiraz) is an Iranian Brigadier General of the Islamic Republic of Iran Air Force and its commander from 5 January 1995 to 27 May 2001. A Northrop F-5 pilot, he later served as the third deputy commander-in-chief of the army from 27 May 2001 to 26 September 2005. He was one of the senior commanders of the army's air force during the Iran–Iraq War. Baghaei is currently a member of the military advisory group to the Supreme Leader of the Islamic Republic of Iran.

== Biography ==
Habib Baghaei was born in 1950 in Shiraz, to parents from Asadabad, Abarkuh, and Yazd. In 1969, he entered the officer academy. Major General Mousa Namjoo was among his professors. He then entered the Iranian Officers' Academy and, after completing his flight training in Iran, was sent to the United States to complete his pilot training. Then, after obtaining his pilot's license, he returned to Iran and served as a second lieutenant at the Fourth Fighter Base in Dezful as an F-5 pilot.

Baghaei was a close friend of Abbas Babaei. Their acquaintance dates back to 1975 at the Dezful Air Base. He also served with Mustafa Ardestani at the Dezful base that year, and in the following years their cooperation continued at the 6th Bushehr Shekari Base and the 2nd Tabriz Shekari Base. Baghaei was also a classmate of Abbas Duran in high school.

At the beginning of the Iran–Iraq War, Baghaei served at the 2nd Tabriz Shekari Base, and from there he continuously participated in retaliatory operations to destroy military facilities and targets in Iraq, including on November 1, 1980, along with a number of other pilots from that base, attacking the Kirkuk oil and gas facilities and refinery with two Tiger F-5 aircraft, destroying most of the aforementioned facilities. In 1983, he was transferred to the Dezful base as an F-5 pilot and then as an operations officer. When in 1984, under the guidance of Abbas Babaei, the Raad base was established at the Omidiyeh Air Base, Baghaei was appointed its commander. Baghaei was stationed in Dezful in 1987 as the commander of the fourth Shekari base and the commander of operations of the Khuzestan air region and the representative of the defense base, and this responsibility of commanding the base continued until 1994.

After Mansour Sattari died in a plane crash near Isfahan Air Base on 5 January 1995 while returning from a mission, Habib Baghaei was appointed commander of the Air Force by order of Ali Khamenei. He remained in this position until 27 May 2001.

Habib Baghaei was appointed Deputy Commander-in-Chief of the Army on June 27 May 2001 by a decree of Ali Khamenei and remained in this position until 26 September 2005.

He married in 1975 and has two sons and a daughter.

Military offices
Preceded by Mostafa Torabipour	Deputy Commander-in-Chief of the Islamic Republic of Iran Army; 27 May 2001–26 September 2005	Succeeded by Mohammad-Reza Gharaei Ashtiani
Preceded by Mansour Sattari	Commander of Islamic Republic of Iran Army Air Force; 5 January 1995–27 May 2001	Succeeded by Reza Pardis
