= Task Force 57 =

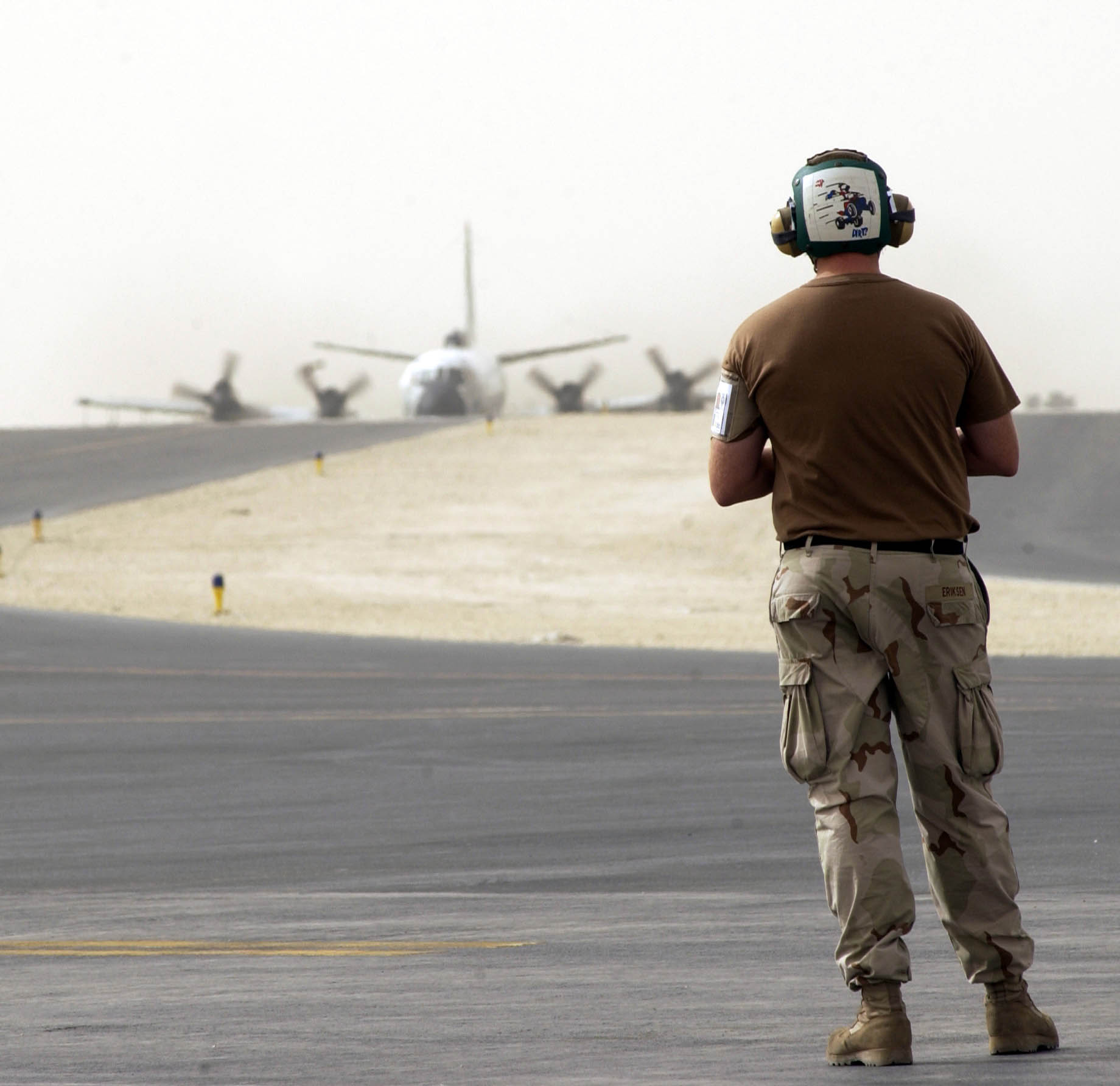
SM 1 Greg Eriksen, part of Task Force 57, waits for an EP-3E Aries aircraft to taxi after a flight from Bahrain

Task Force 57 (TF 57) is a United States Navy task force.

It was previously active during World War II. Task Force numbers were in constant use, and there were several incarnations of TF 57 during World War II. Land based bombers of the United States Air Force's Seventh Air Force were part of TF 57 during 1943–1944. The British Pacific Fleet was allocated as TF 57 in 1945 before being redesignated Task Force 37 in May.

During the Cold War, Task Force 57 was allocated to the United States Pacific Fleet, and available for use, though it was little publicised.

From 1995, it has been part of the United States Fifth Fleet. It appears to be now the Fleet's Maritime Patrol and Reconnaissance Force, under the operational control of Commander, Patrol and Reconnaissance Force, Fifth Fleet.

Task Force 57 has had Lockheed P-3 Orion maritime patrol aircraft stationed at Masirah Island, Oman, and Diego Garcia. Through Naval Forces Central Command's Combined Maritime Forces, Japanese, German, Australian, and New Zealand aircraft have also formed part of the task force.

According to the Task Force's official website, it normally comprises five squadrons or detachments of Lockheed P-3C Orion and EP-3 Aries II aircraft with detachments from combined maritime forces members including Australia, France, Germany, Italy, Pakistan, Canada, Denmark, Turkey, the U.S. and U.K., as well as other naval forces and personnel from several other nations. The task force currently has over 900 personnel assigned to it, a number which includes coalition forces deployed for Operation Enduring Freedom.

The major task groups in the command are Fleet Air Reconnaissance Squadron detachment (Task Group 57.1), Bahrain Air Patrol Group (Task Group 57.18), and Al Udeid Air Patrol Group (Task Group 57.2).

In 1995 when U.S. Fifth Fleet was established to conduct operations in the Middle East, PATWING ONE assumed the same role for 5th Fleet as CTF-57. On 1 June 1999 all Pacific Fleet Patrol Wings were redesignated Patrol and Reconnaissance Wings and the wing became Patrol and Reconnaissance Wing ONE.

Patrol and Reconnaissance ONE continued operations from Kamiseya as Commander, Task Force 72 for 7th Fleet, and Commander, Task Force 57]] for 5th Fleet until September 2003 when the Navy elevated the rank of the Commander from Captain to that of Rear Admiral. At that time the wing ceased being called COMPATRECONWING ONE and it became Commander, Patrol and Reconnaissance Force 5th Fleet and Commander, Patrol and Reconnaissance Force 7th Fleet (COMPATRECONFOR 5TH/7TH Fleet), it also retained the titles Commander, Task Force 72 and Commander Task Force 57. It was also dual hatted as Commander, Fleet Air Western Pacific (COMFAIRWESTPAC). At that time it relocated to Naval Air Facility Misawa which is located aboard Misawa Air Base (USAF/JASDF) in northern Japan. In 2010 part of the COMPATRECONFOR 5th/7th Fleet staff (to include the Commander) was relocated to NAF Atsugi, while the remainder of the staff remained in Misawa.

In 2011 the 5th Fleet stood up COMPATRECONWING 57, a Headquarters staff, to function as Commander, Task Force 57 which reported to COMPATRECONFOR 5th/7th Fleet. In 2012 COMFAIRWESTPAC became Commander, Fleet Air Forward. In July 2013 the Rear Admiral commanding COMPATRECONFOR 5th/7th Fleet was replaced with a Captain, and at some point after that the COMPATRECONFOR 5th/7th Fleet designation ceased being used and the COMPATRECONWING ONE designation reappeared attached to the Commander, Task Force 72 and Commander, Fleet Air Forward Designations.
