= Bahram Afzali =

Iranian naval commander (1937–1984)

Timsar Bahram Afzali
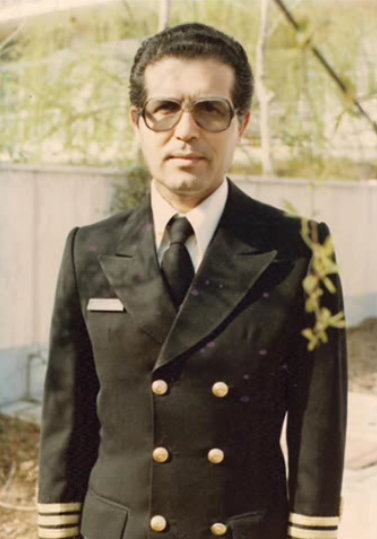
- Afzali in summer 1980

Commander of the Iranian Navy
- In office May/June 1980 – 24 or 30 April 1983
- President: Abolhassan Banisadr; Mohammad-Ali Rajai; Ali Khamenei
- Prime Minister: Mir-Hossein Mousavi
- Supreme Leader: Ruhollah Khomeini
- Preceded by: A. Tabatabaei (acting); Mahmoud Alavi
- Succeeded by: Esfandiar Hosseini

Personal details
- Born: Bahram Afzali Khoshkebijari; 6 December 1937 Qom, Pahlavi Iran
- Died: 25 February 1984 (aged 46) Tehran, Iran
- Party: Tudeh Party of Iran
- Education: Italian Naval Academy; University of Genoa

Military service
- Allegiance: Pahlavi Iran (1957–1979); Iran (1979–1984)
- Branch/service: Imperial Iranian Navy (1957–1979); Islamic Republic of Iran Navy (1979–1984)
- Years of service: 1957–1984
- Rank: Captain
- Battles/wars: Iran–Iraq War; Operation Morvarid

Bahram Afzali (Persian: بهرام افضلی; 6 December 1937 – 25 February 1984) was an Iranian admiral who served as the Commander of the Iranian Navy from May/June 1980 to 24 April 1983. He was executed for his clandestine membership in the Tudeh Party of Iran in 1984.

== Career ==
Afzali was born in 1937 in the city of Qom. His father was a cleric. He entered the service of the Imperial Iranian Navy in 1957 and was sent to Italy for further education. In 1961, he was graduated from Italian Naval Academy, where he was trained in mechanical engineering and shipbuilding. He later obtained a PhD in boat and submarine architecture in 1970.

Afzali was an engineer and a captain in the Imperial Iranian Navy. After the 1979 revolution, he continued to serve in the Navy and took part in the Iran–Iraq War. Then Iranian president Abolhassan Banisadr appointed him as the commander of the Navy in June 1980. He was also special adviser of then speaker of the Iranian parliament, Akbar Hashemi Rafsanjani.

== Arrest, trial and death ==
At the beginning of 1983, Afzali, along with more than a thousand members of the Tudeh Party was arrested by the IRP. The trial carried out in the form of a military tribunal in December 1983, and 32 of them were sentenced to death. Their judge was Hujjat al-Islam Mohammad Reyshahri, who also interrogated Mehdi Hashemi in 1986. The location of the tribunal has been never revealed.

Ten of these Tudeh members were executed. On 25 February 1984, Afzali was executed on charges of espionage for the Soviet Union.

== See also ==
- Iranian leaders of the Iran–Iraq War

Military offices
Preceded by Mahmoud Alavi	Commander of the Islamic Republic of Iran Navy; June 1980–30 April 1983	Succeeded by Esfandiar Hosseini
