= Hossein Khanzadi =

Commander of the Iranian Navy from 2017 to 2021

Amir Hossein Khanzadi
- حسین خانزادی
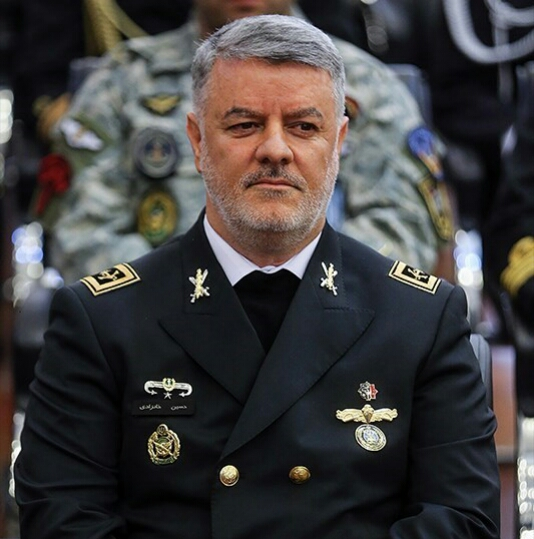
- Khanzadi in 2017

Commander of the Iranian Navy
- In office 5 November 2017 – 17 August 2021
- President: Hassan Rouhani; Ebrahim Raisi
- Supreme Leader: Ali Khamenei
- Preceded by: Habibollah Sayyari
- Succeeded by: Shahram Irani

Deputy for Plans, Programs, and Budget of the Iranian Navy
- In office 2011–2017
- President: Mahmoud Ahmadinejad; Hassan Rouhani
- Supreme Leader: Ali Khamenei
- Preceded by: Hossein-Ali Lali
- Succeeded by: Mohammad Reza Azizi

Personal details
- Born: c. 1967 (age 58–59) Gorgan, Pahlavi Iran
- Education: Naval University of Noshahr; University of Command and Staff; Pakistan Naval War College; Supreme National Defense University

Military service
- Allegiance: Iran
- Branch/service: Navy
- Years of service: 1986–2021
- Rank: Commodore
- Unit: Lavan

Hossein Khanzadi (Persian: حسین خانزادی) is an Iranian hovercraft pilot in the regular military (Artesh) who served as the Commander of the Islamic Republic of Iran Navy from November 2017 to August 2021. On 17 August 2021, Rear Admiral Khanzadi was replaced by Shahram Irani, the first Sunni high ranking commander, on the orders of the Supreme Leader Ayatollah Sayed Ali Khamenei.

During his tenure, the navy lost three vessels in non-combat incidents, namely Damavand (77), Konarak (A1403) and Kharg (431).

Military offices
Preceded by Habibollah Sayyari	Commander of the Islamic Republic of Iran Navy; 5 November 2017–17 August 2021	Succeeded by Shahram Irani
