= Iranian leaders of the Iran–Iraq War =

This is a list of Iranian leaders of the Armed Forces of the Islamic Republic of Iran during the Iran–Iraq War (1980–1988).

== Leaders ==
Commander-in-Chief of the Iranian Armed Forces

- Abolhassan Banisadr (Start of War – 10 June 1981)
- Ruhollah Khomeini (10 June 1981 – End of War)
  - Akbar Rafsanjani, acted as the de facto commander-in-chief since mid-1980s and was later officially appointed as the deputy commander-in-chief on 2 June 1988
    - Hassan Rouhani, served as deputy to second-in-command since 1988

== Military commanders ==
=== Strategic level ===
==== Islamic Republic of Iran Army ====
Chief-of-Staff

- Brig. Gen. Valiollah Fallahi (KIA) (Start of War – 29 September 1981)
- Brig. Gen. Qasem-Ali Zahirnejad (1 October 1981 – 25 October 1984)
- Col. Esmaeil Sohrabi (25 October 1984 – 1988)
- Brig. Gen. Ali Shahbazi (1988 – End of War)

Ground Force

- Brig. Gen. Qasem-Ali Zahirnejad (Start of War – 1 October 1981)
- Col. Ali Sayyad Shirazi (1 October 1981 – Spring 1986)
- Col. Hossein Hassani-Sadi (Spring 1986 – End of War)

Air Force

- Col. Javad Fakoori (KIA) (Start of War – 29 September 1981)
- Col. Mohammad-Hossein Moinpour (2 October 1981 – 25 November 1983)
- Col. Houshang Seddigh (25 November 1983 – 1986)
- Col. Mansour Sattari (1986 – End of War)

Navy

- Cpt. Bahram Afzali (executed) (Start of War – 30 April 1983)
- Cpt. Esfandiar Hosseini (30 April 1983 – 25 June 1985)
- Cpt. Mohammad-Hossein Malekzadegan (25 June 1985 – End of War)

==== Islamic Revolutionary Guard Corps ====
Commander-in-Chief

- Morteza Rezaee (Start of War –)
- Mohsen Rezaee (11 September 1981 – End of War)

General Staff

- Alireza Afshar (November 1984 – )
- Mohammad Forouzandeh (– End of War)
- Gholam Ali Rashid (as one of the senior commanders of IRGC)

Basij

- Amir Majd (Start of War – December 1981)
- Ahmad Salek (December 1981 –)
- Mohammad-Ali Rahmani (16 February 1984 – End of War)

Ground Force

- Yahya Rahim Safavi (1985–)
- Ali Shamkhani (May 1986 –)

Air Force

- Akbar Rafan (1985 – End of War)

Navy

- Hossein Alaei (1985 – End of War)

=== Operational level ===
==== Islamic Republic of Iran Army ====
Division commanders

- Col. Hassan Abshenasan (KIA)
- Col. Masoud Monfared Niyaki (KIA)
- Col. Hasan Aghareb Parast (KIA)

==== Islamic Revolutionary Guard Corps ====
Division commanders

- Hossein Kharrazi (KIA)
- Mohammad Bagher Ghalibaf
- Ahmad Kazemi
- Mohammad Boroujerdi (KIA)
- Ebrahim Hemmat (KIA)
- Qasem Soleimani
- Mehdi Bakeri (KIA)
- Ahmad Motevaselian
- Mehdi Zeinoddin (KIA)
- Mahmoud Kaveh (KIA)
- Ali Hashemi (Commander)
- Sabz Ali Khodadad (Commander)

== Ministers ==
Minister of Defence

- Mostafa Chamran (Start of War – 29 October 1980)
- Col. Javad Fakoori (–September 1980)
- Col. Mousa Namjoo (KIA) (17–29 September 1981)
- Col. Mohammad Salimi (October 1981 – October 1985)
- Col. Mohammad Hossein Jalali (October 1985 – End of War)

Minister of Revolutionary Guards

- Mohsen Rafighdoost (November 1982 – End of War)
