= 1st Marine Brigade =

1st Marine Brigade may refer to:

- 1st Marine Brigade (Iran), a Takavar unit of the Islamic Republic of Iran Navy
- 1st Provisional Marine Brigade, a United States Marine Corps ad hoc infantry brigade in service from 1912 to 1950
- 1st Marine Division, formerly known as the 1st Advance Base Brigade, 1913–1933
- 1st Marine Expeditionary Brigade (United States), a permanent United States Marine Corps crisis response expeditionary brigade formerly known as the 1st Marine Brigade (1956-1985) and as the 1st Marine Amphibious Brigade (1985-1988)
- 1st Marine Brigade (China), a PLANMC brigade
