= Women in the Iran–Iraq War =

Women in the Iran–Iraq War were active in a number of roles.

== Women in the military ==
Despite the strict sex segregation in Iran introduced after the Iranian Revolution, a number of Iranian women served in the military and in paramilitaries during the War. Around 25 000 Iranian served as doctors and nurses, at least 500 fought as combatants, and at least 170 were taken prisoners of war by Iraq. Iranian women were also active in managing food supplies for soldiers, in the transport of war supplies, and in intelligence efforts. Potentially as many as 25% of the combatants at the Battle of Khorramshahr were women and at least 6400 Iranian women were killed during the war, 5700 injured, and 3000 disabled. Marzieh Hadidchi, one of the founders of the Islamic Revolutionary Guard Corps, served as a military commander during the war.

The Iranian government made use of women in war propaganda, depicting them as mothers and wives of male soldiers cheering on those soldiers' martyrdom. Women were also recruited to participate in letter-writing campaigns, both to encourage soldiers fighting on the front and to encourage men to enlist as soldiers.

However, the Iranian government covered up the participation of women in the war. Journalist Maryam Kazemzadeh noted that a number of makeshift memorials set up during the war to women who were killed were removed by the Iranian government. In 2019, the Foundation for the Preservation and Publication of Sacred Defense Works and Values stated that it was "ready to pursue naming sites after female martyrs because we believe the role of women in the Sacred Defense has been ignored."

A number of Iraqi women also served in the military during the war, particularly in the Iraqi air force and air defence squads and particularly towards the latter years of the war as Iraqi manpower grew increasingly limited.

== Women civilians ==
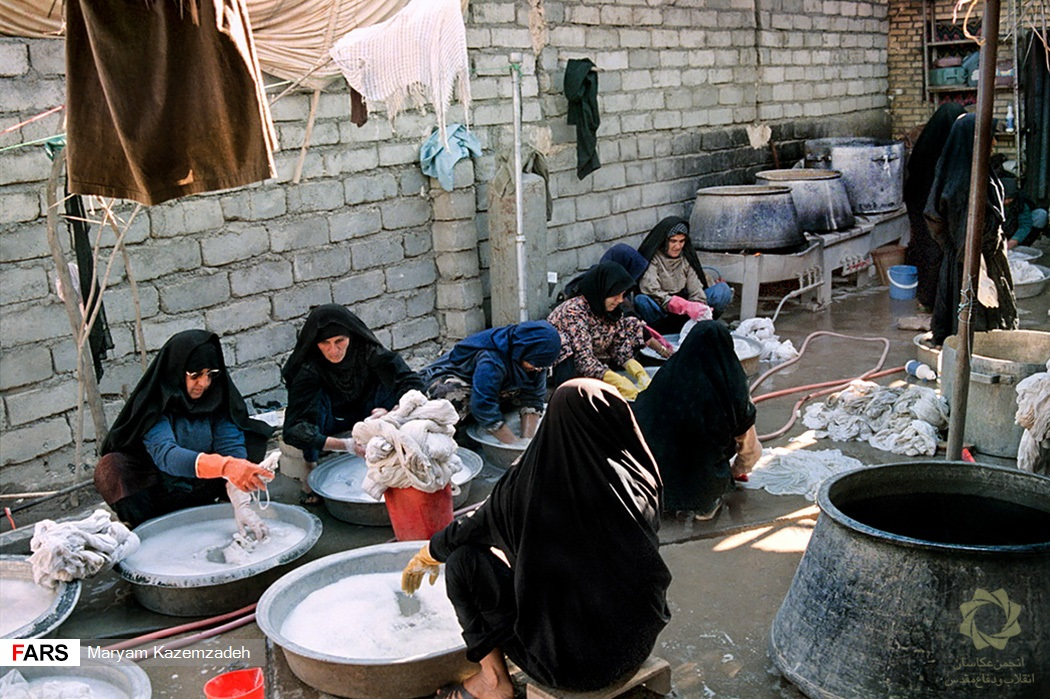
Iranian women in Ahvaz washing clothes, blankets, tents and sleeping bags in support of the war effort

During the height of the Iran-Iraq War, women made up a large portion of the domestic workforce in Iran, replacing men who were fighting, injured, or dead. Women also played significant roles in lobbying for military veteran pension plans after the war. According to Elaheh Koolaee of the University of Tehran, "the experience of Iranian women during the eight-year imposed war shows a great similarity to women during World War II."

During the war, Maryam Kazamzadeh became the first female war photojournalist in Iran. In 2018, she was among the women featured in a billboard campaign by the newly-elected reformist municipal government of Tehran.

In Iraq, the war also had a significant effect on women civilians. According to Nadje Sadig Al-Ali, author of Iraqi Women: Untold Stories from 1948 to the Present: "women carried the conflicting double burden of being the main motors of the state bureaucracy and the public sector, the main breadwinners and heads of households but also the mothers of 'future soldiers.' During the war, the Iraqi government offered children and wives of deceased soldiers with a small piece of land or sum of money to build a house, however the compensation was significantly less than those families were officially entitled to. During the latter years of the war, the Iraqi government launched plans to encourage women to quit their jobs and raise children in response to the death toll. After the end of the war, women's employment decreased as they were pushed out of workplaces to make way for returning soldiers.

The progression of women's education in Iraq was significantly hampered during the war and women's overall literacy rate continued to decline well afterwards, a drop more pronounced in the Southern rural provinces where obtaining an education was already difficult to begin with. Overall school attendance during the Iraq War was 68% amongst young girls compared to 82% of young boys, while girls in rural areas had a mere 25% attendance rate. As necessary items such as food and water started to become more scarce and expensive, women were forced to work in agriculture rather than pursue education. Violence against women, such as rape, became more commonplace during the war period, and was another reason why women did not pursue education.

The war also saw an impact on women in Kurdistan. In August 1979, the Iranian Army launched an offensive to destroy the autonomist movement in Kurdistan. Kurdish organizations such as Komala, which engaged in guerrilla warfare against the Iranian government during the war, recruited hundreds of women into their military and political ranks. Within its own camps, Komala abolished gender segregation and women took part in combat and military training. During the Anfal Campaign in 1988, Kurdish women were kept in concentration camps and rape was used as a form of punishment.

== In popular media ==
According to Laetitia Nanquette of SOAS, despite the fact that "from around the 1990s up to the present day, women have been the primary writers of Iranian fiction," they have mostly been absent from Iranian literature about the war, which "is usually written by men and contains nationalistic discourses, coupled with the discourse of martyrdom as the way to defend the version of Islam promoted as the only truth by the regime."

The book One Woman's War: Da (Mother) by Zahra Hosseini and detailing her experiences during the war won the 2009 Jalal Al-e Ahmad Literary Award. Mateo Farzaneh of Northeastern Illinois University has written about the role of women in the war in his book Iranian Women and Gender in the Iran-Iraq War. In 2019, four books were published in Iran on the role of women in the Battle of Khorramshahr.

Iranian filmmaker Tahmineh Milani has previously stated that she attempted to make a film about the role of women in the war but was denied permission by the Iranian government.

== See also ==
- Women in Iran
- Women in Iraq
- General Federation of Iraqi Women
