= Esfandiar Hosseini =

Iranian naval officer (1942–2023)

Timsar Esfandiar Hosseini
- اسفندیار حسینی
- Born: 1942
- Died: 2023 (aged 80–81)
- Military career
- Allegiance: Pahlavi Iran (1960s–1979); Iran (1979–1986)
- Branch: Imperial Iranian Navy (1960s–1979); Islamic Republic of Iran Navy (1979–1986)
- Service years: 1960s–1986
- Rank: Captain
- Conflicts: Iran–Iraq War

Esfandiar Hosseini (Persian: اسفندیار حسینی; 7 March 1942 – 1 October 2023) was an Iranian military officer who served as the Commander of the Islamic Republic of Iran Navy from 1983 to 1985.

Hosseini was appointed to the position on 30 April 1983 and served in the capacity until 25 June 1985, when he resigned for unknown reasons.

== Personal life ==
Hosseini was a non-religious person and married to an Italian woman.

== See also ==
- Iranian leaders of the Iran–Iraq War

Military offices
Preceded by Bahram Afzali	Commander of the Islamic Republic of Iran Navy; 30 April 1983–27 June 1985	Succeeded by Mohammad-Hossein Malekzadegan
