= Sajjad Kouchaki =

Iranian retired military officer

Amir Sajjad Kouchaki
- سجاد کوچکی
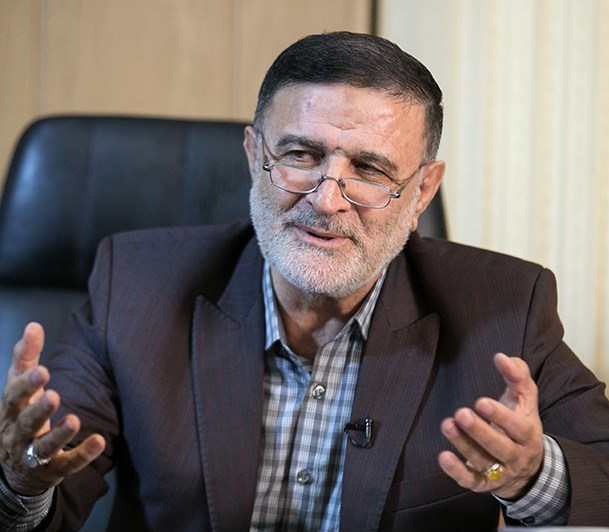
- Sajjad in 2018
- Born: Sajjad Kouchaki Badelani; 1955 (age 70–71)
- Military career
- Allegiance: Iran
- Branch: Navy
- Rank: Commodore
- Conflicts: Iran–Iraq War

Sajjad Kouchaki (Persian: سجاد کوچکی) is an Iranian retired military officer who served as the Commander of the Islamic Republic of Iran Navy from 2005 to 2007.

According to an analysis published by The Washington Institute for Near East Policy, Kouchaki was "one of the architects of the country’s naval doctrine".

Military offices
Preceded by Abbas Mohtaj	Commander of the Islamic Republic of Iran Navy; 2005–2007	Succeeded by Habibollah Sayyari
