= Sabz Ali Khodadad =

Sabz-Ali Khodadad سبزعلی خداداد
- Born: March 1959; Babol
- Died: 30 November 1986 (aged 27); Iran–Iraq War
- Military career
- Allegiance: Islamic Republic of Iran
- Rank: The commander of the Karbala-25 Division and the Malik-Ashtar Brigade
- Nickname: Ali Cherik (علی چریک)
- Conflicts: Iran–Iraq War

Sabz-Ali Khodadad (Persian: سبزعلی خداداد) (born in 1959, Hatkeh Posht village, Babol) was the commander of the 2nd Brigade of Karbala-25 Division and the Malik-Ashtar Brigade (in Kurdistan) during Iran–Iraq War. He died on 30 November 1986 owing to hitting by mortar fragments—in Operation Karbala-4 during the reconnaissance operations in the region. Khodadad was buried in the city of Babol.

Khodadad became an official member of the Islamic Revolutionary Guard Corps in 1980 and joined the Tehran Revolutionary Guard Corps in early 1981. Sabzali Khodadad participated in the Iran–Iraq War, in Operations Quds 1 and Valfajr 8 (liberation of the city of Faw) in February 1986. In 1987, he participated in Operation Karbala 1 (i.e. the liberation of Mehran city). Operation Karbala-4 was considered the last reconnaissance-operation that Sabz-Ali Khodadad participated in, which finally resulted in his death by shrapnel from a 60-mm mortar shell.

== See also ==
- List of Iranian commanders in the Iran–Iraq War
