= Hooshang Samadi =

Iranian military officer

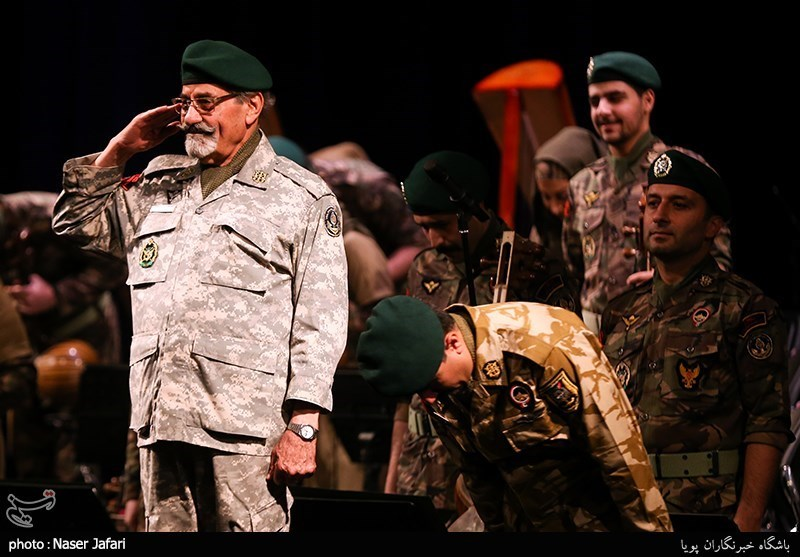
- Samadi in "Cypresses Die While Standing" concert.
- Born: Hooshang Samadi Kalkhurani; 26 January 1940 (age 86); Kalkhuran Sheykh, Ardabil, Imperial State of Iran
- Military career
- Allegiance: Imperial State of Iran (1958–1979); Islamic Republic of Iran (1979–1985)
- Branch: Navy (1975–1985); Ground Force (1958–1975)
- Service years: 1958–1985
- Rank: Captain
- Commands: 1st Takavar Marine Battalion
- Conflicts: Joint Operation Arvand; Second Iraqi–Kurdish War; 1979 Khuzestan insurgency; Iran–Iraq War (WIA); First Battle of Khorramshahr; Operation Pearl; Operation Samen-ol-A'emeh; Second Battle of Khorramshahr

Hooshang Samadi Kalkhurani (Persian: هوشنگ صمدی کلخوران) is a retired Iranian military officer and war hero who served in the Iranian Navy during the Iran–Iraq War.

Samadi was commander of the 1st Marine Battalion, a naval infantry special unit that played a key role in the First and Second Battle of Khorramshahr under his command.
