= Naval Support Facility Kamiseya =

Detachment of U.S. Naval Air Facility

Coordinates: 35°29′11.0″N 139°29′25.6″E

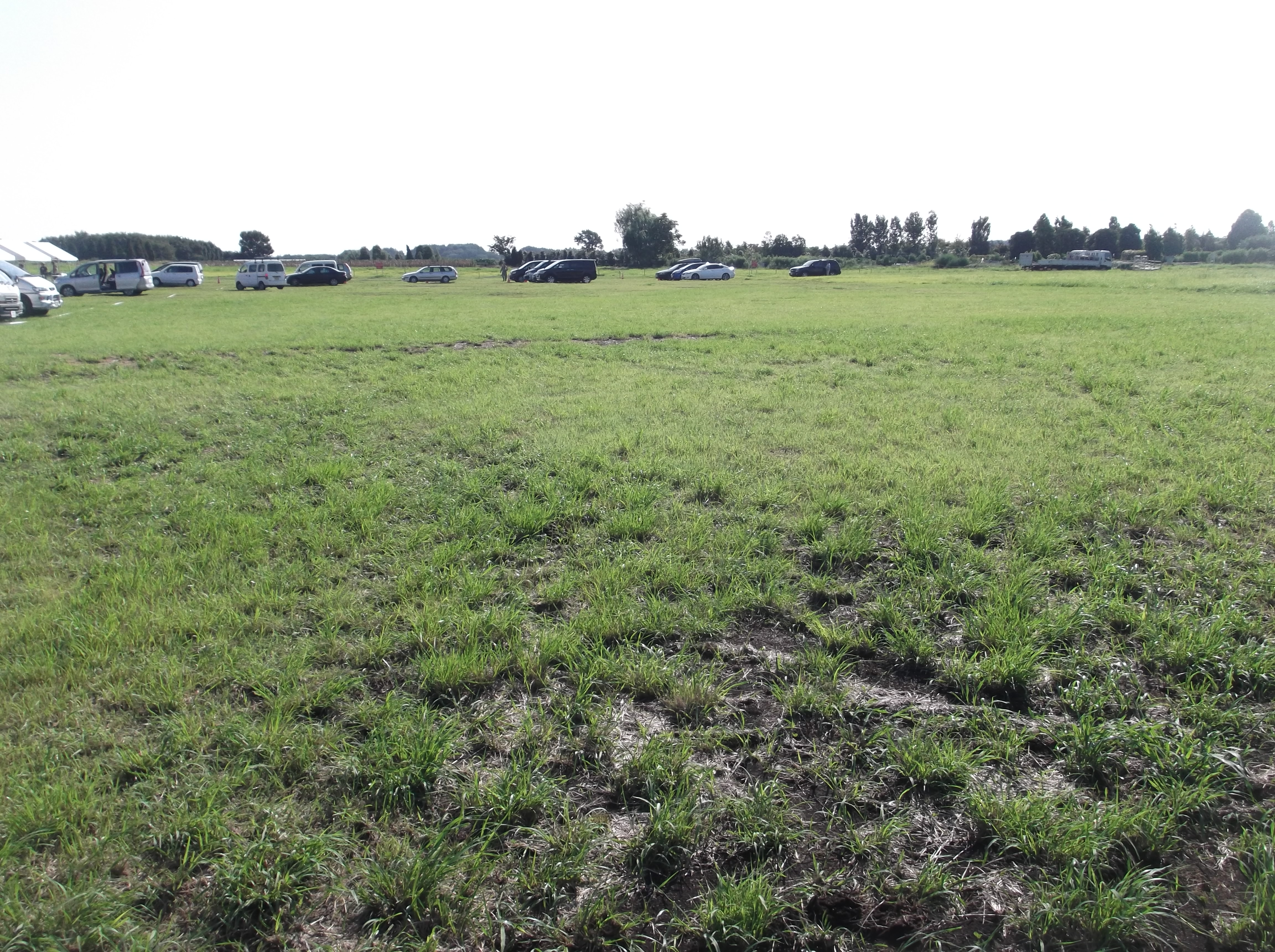

Naval Support Facility Kamiseya (上瀬谷通信施設, Kamiseya Tsūshin Shisetsu) (UIC 0557A) was a detachment of U.S. Naval Air Facility, NAF Atsugi, Japan. The facility is located on the Kantō Plain, approximately three miles (4.8 km) northeast of NAF Atsugi, and 7.55 miles (12.15 km) WNW of Yokohama. The western gate is open during the day to the public. It follows into a field of about 400 meters long, with a helipad in the Northern section. This area is an excellent kite flying location, though remote controlled devices are prohibited.

The base served as a command and control centre for U.S. Navy anti-submarine warfare aircraft, notably Patrol and Reconnaissance Wing 1, before the wing headquarters moved to NAF Misawa circa 2003.

== History ==
After World War II, this former Imperial Japanese Navy torpedo manufacturing facility was used by the United States Navy as a Signals intelligence - radio communications intercept station until it ceased such operations in the late 1990s. On September 24, 1965, a fire broke out in one of the operational buildings, killing twelve United States military personnel. Most of the deaths occurred because the men were unable to escape through a locked exit, and were overcome by the smoke. Although the official investigation listed faulty electrical circuitry as the cause of the fire, some eyewitness accounts attributed it to failure in a recently installed incinerator, used for destruction of classified information / classified material, which had been improperly vented through the wall and subsequently caused the wall to ignite. Many still believe this was an "official" coverup. The incinerator was a fairly recent installation, and was installed after two Navy enlisted men (Ames and Gerfen) discovered that classified materials were being placed in dumpsters which were subsequently emptied by a commercial waste management company, and could have been then been made available to security elements of other countries.

The main operations building, in which the fire took place, was originally built underground. The walls and ceiling were made of reinforced concrete six to eight feet thick. It was theoretically bomb-proof, by WW2 standards. Therefore, with no windows and few doors, a fire was especially dangerous. Many of the men who died had put on respirators, which were stored in a cabinet near the exit. Unfortunately, these were all ABC respirators, and they soon became clogged by the large particulates in the smoke.

During the Vietnam War, Kamiseya was used to main Communications Security (COMSEC) facilities. By the 1990s, all antennas were removed.

=== Return to Japan ===
This facility was turned over to the Japanese government on June 30, 2015. Yokohama City plans to turn it into a new urban development project.

== Facility ==
The base consists of 587 acres (2.38 km^{2}) with 110 acres (0.45 km^{2}) within the fence line. It had 184 buildings (including three bachelor quarters and 68 housing units) and a plant property value of $100 million. Base population consists of 300 sailors, their families and personnel who work on the facility.
