= Patrol and Reconnaissance Wing 1 =

United States Navy submarine base

Site information
- Type: Wing
- Controlled by: United States Navy

Site history
- In use: 1937–present

Garrison information
- Past commanders: Charles P. Mason; William K. Harrill

Patrol and Reconnaissance Wing 1 is a maritime patrol aircraft wing of the United States Navy, responsible to Commander, Naval Air Forces, Pacific. It is located at Misawa Air Base, Japan, a Japan Air Self-Defense Force base.

The wing was established as Patrol Wing 1 in San Diego on 1 October 1937. It relocated to NAS Kaneohe, Hawaii on 16 October 1941. On 19 September 1942 it relocated to Noumea where on 1 November 1942 it was redesignated Fleet Air Wing One (FAW-1). In December 1942 it was relocated to Espiritu Santo; and in March 1943 to Guadalcanal, and in February 1944 to Munda. In July 1944 it was relocated back to Espiritu Santo, and on 11 September 1944 to the Schouten Islands aboard USS Hamlin (AV-15). On 15 October 1944 the wing was relocated to Ulithi, and on 30 December 1944 relocated to Saipan. On 19 February 1945 it was relocated to Iwo Jima during invasion operations, again aboard USS Hamlin; on 10 March 1945 it relocated to NAF Agana, Guam; and on 26 March 1945 to Kerama Rhetto aboard Hamlin. On 14 July 1945 it was relocated to NAF Chimu Wan, Okinawa.

On 16 July 1950 Fleet Air Wing One was relocated to Naval Air Station Agana, Guam, then to NAF Naha, Okinawa. During this period it fought in the Korean War. In the 3rd Quarter 1952 it was relocated to NAS San Diego, Calif. In the 4th Quarter 1954 returned to NAF Naha, Okinawa. In mid-1958 it relocated to Buckner Bay, Okinawa, aboard its assigned flagship. In mid-1965 it again returned to NAF Naha, Okinawa where on 30 June 1973 Fleet Air Wings were redesigned Patrol Wings and the wing once again became Patrol Wing ONE. A month later it relocated to Naval Support Facility Kamiseya, Japan where it assumed the role of a headquarters staff, with no squadrons permanently assigned which exercised operational control of VP squadrons deployed to 7th Fleet as Commander, Task Force 72. In 1995 when U.S. Fifth Fleet was established to conduct operations in the Middle East, PATWING ONE assumed the same role for 5th Fleet as CTF-57. On 1 June 1999 all Pacific Fleet Patrol Wings were redesignated Patrol and Reconnaissance Wings and the wing became Patrol and Reconnaissance Wing ONE.

Patrol and Reconnaissance ONE continued operations from Kamiseya as Commander Task Force 72 for 7th Fleet, and Commander, Task Force 57 for 5th Fleet until September 2003 when the Navy elevated the rank of the Commander from Captain to that of Rear Admiral. At that time the wing ceased being called COMPATRECONWING ONE and it became Commander, Patrol and Reconnaissance Force 5th Fleet and Commander, Patrol and Reconnaissance Force 7th Fleet (COMPATRECONFOR 5TH/7TH Fleet), it also retained the titles Commander, Task Force 72 and Commander Task Force 57. It was also dual hatted as Commander, Fleet Air Western Pacific (COMFAIRWESTPAC). At that time it relocated to Naval Air Facility Misawa which is located aboard Misawa Air Base (USAF/JASDF) in northern Japan. In 2010 part of the COMPATRECONFOR 5th/7th Fleet staff (to include the Commander) was relocated to NAF Atsugi, while the remainder of the staff remained in Misawa. In 2011 the 5th Fleet stood up COMPATRECONWING 57, a Headquarters staff, to function as Commander, Task Force 57 which reported to COMPATRECONFOR 5th/7th Fleet. In 2012 COMFAIRWESTPAC became Commander, Fleet Air Forward. In July 2013 the Rear Admiral commanding COMPATRECONFOR 5th/7th Fleet was replaced with a Captain and at some point after that the COMPATRECONFOR 5th/7th Fleet designation ceased being used and the COMPATRECONWING ONE designation reappeared attached to the Commander, Task Force 72 and Commander, Fleet Air Forward Designations.

The lineage of the wing includes Patrol Wing 1(1st), Fleet Air Wing 1, Patrol Wing 1(2nd), Patrol and Reconnaissance Wing 1.

Meanwhile, at times from August 1950, Commander, Fleet Air Wing One served as Commander, Task Force 72 (CTF-72), the Taiwan Patrol Force. In 1958 the TPF was directing elements of VQ-1, Fleet Air Service Squadrons 119 and 120, VP-4, a VP(S), an AV, an AVP, and a destroyer division. The Taiwan Patrol Force was disestablished in 1979.
