= Reza Pardis =

Iranian retired military pilot

Amir Reza Pardis
- سید رضا پردیس
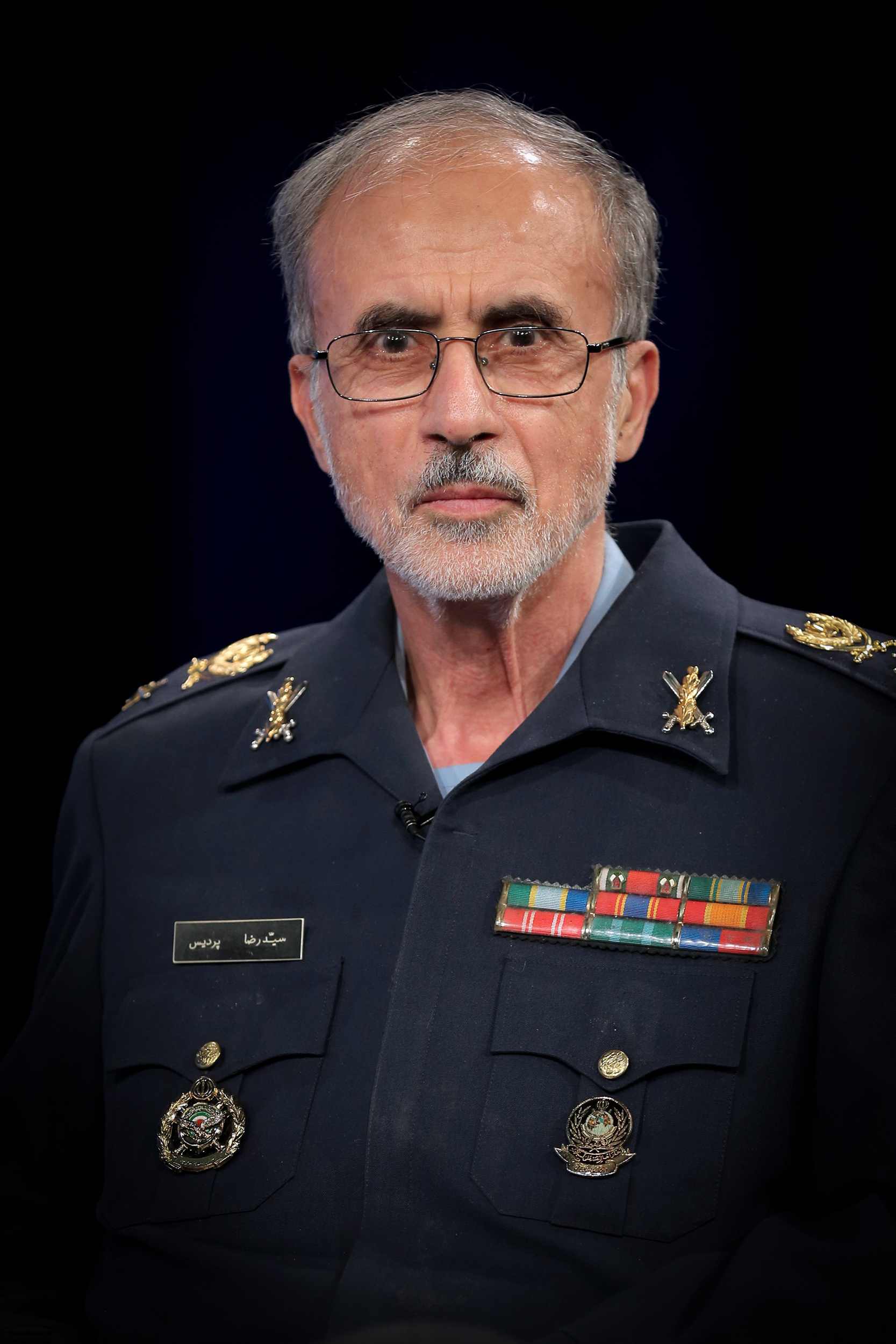
- General Pardis in 2021
- Born: 1946 (age 79–80); Qazvin, Pahlavi Iran
- Alma mater: Supreme National Defense University
- Military career
- Allegiance: Pahlavi Iran (1965–1979); Iran (1979–present)
- Branch: Air Force
- Service years: 1965–present
- Rank: Brigadier General
- Commands: Senior Military Adviser to the Commander-in-Chief (2004–2010); Deputy Commander of Air Defense (2002–2004); IRIA Air Force (1994–2001); Deputy for Operations, Islamic Republic of Iran Air Force, and Deputy for Operations, Khatam al-Anbia Air Defense Headquarters. (1996–2001); Director of Operations, Deputy for Operations of the Air force (1992–1996); 3rd Tactical Air Base (1984–1996); Deputy Commander of the 3rd Tactical Air Base (1983); Deputy for Operations of the 10th Tactical Air Base (1980)
- Conflicts: Iran–Iraq War
- Awards: Order of Fath

Reza Pardis (Persian: سید رضا پردیس; born 1946 in Qazvin) was a Brigadier General, an F-4 Phantom II pilot in the Islamic Republic of Iran Air Force and its commander from 27 May 2001 to 14 October 2004.

He joined the Imperial Iranian Air Force in 1965. In 1967 he completed a F-4 Phantom 2 radar course in the United States. In 1969 he completed a F-4 Phantom 2 radar instructor course in the United States. In 1970 he was appointed head of the Air Force's technical and pilot training.

he was an air force pilot during the Iran–Iraq War, receiving the Order of Fath for his performance in the war.

In 1980 he was appointed Deputy chief of operations for the 10th Tactical Air Base, then deputy commander in 1983, and commander of the 3rd Tactical Air Base from 1984 to 1996. From 1992 to 1996 he served as Director of Operations, Deputy for Operations, of the Air Force. From 1996 to 2001 he served as Deputy for Air Force Operations and Deputy for Operations, Khatam al-Anbia Air Defense Headquarters. From 2002 to 2004 he served as Deputy Commander of Air Defense. From 2001 to 2004 he served as Commander of the Army Air Force. From 2004 to 2010 he served as Senior Advisor to the Commander-in-Chief of the Armed Forces.

In 1996 Obtained a PhD from the Supreme National Defense University. From 1996 to 2000 taught at the university.

Military offices
Preceded by Habib Baghaei	Commander of Islamic Republic of Iran Army Air Force; 27 May 2001–14 October 2004	Succeeded by Karim Qavami
