= Mohammad-Hossein Moeinpour =

Iranian military officer

Timsar Mohammad-Hossein Moeinpour
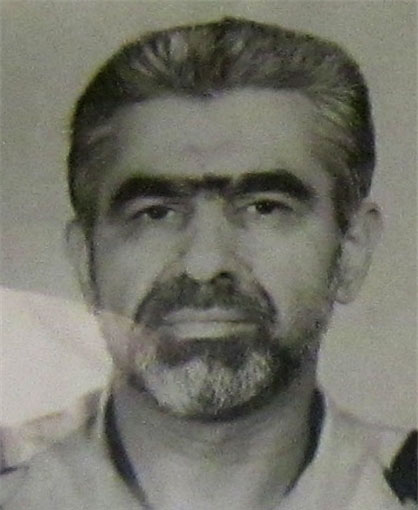
- Born: 29 January 1934; Tehran, Pahlavi Iran
- Died: 22 June 2014 (aged 80); Tehran, Iran
- Military career
- Allegiance: Pahlavi Iran (1952–1979); Iran (1979–2014)
- Branch: Air Force
- Service years: 1952–2014
- Rank: Brigadier General
- Commands: Iranian Air Force (1981–1983)
- Conflicts: Iran–Iraq War

Mohammad-Hossein Moeinpour (Persian: محمدحسین معین‌پور) was an Iranian military officer. He served as the commander of the Air Force from 2 October 1981 to 25 November 1983. He was a Major at the time appointed to the office, however, he was promoted two ranks and became a Colonel to qualify the position. He resigned for health reasons, however according to Pierre Razoux, Moeinpour was dismissed for his "excessive caution" and for a string of defections of pilots under his command.

== See also ==
- Iranian leaders of the Iran–Iraq War

Military offices
Preceded by Javad Fakoori	Commander of the Islamic Republic of Iran Air Force; 2 October 1981–25 November 1983	Succeeded by Houshang Seddigh
