= Commander of the Iranian Navy =

Top naval officer in Iran

- Flag of the Islamic Republic of Iran Navy

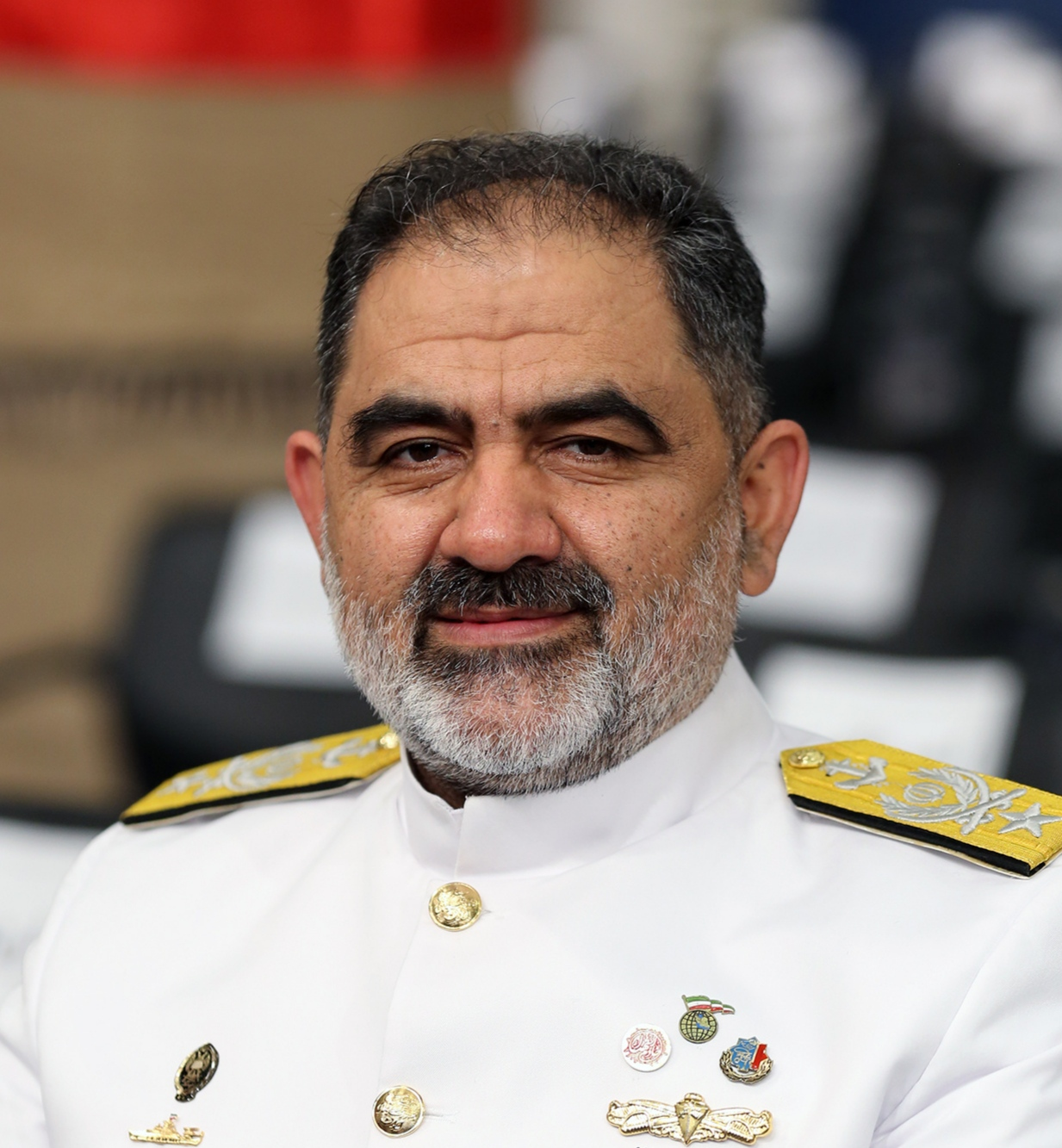
- Incumbent; Commodore Shahram Irani since 17 August 2021
- Islamic Republic of Iran Navy
- Member of: Islamic Republic of Iran Armed Forces
- Reports to: Commander of the Islamic Republic of Iran Army
- Nominator: Commander-in-Chief of the Army
- Appointer: Supreme Leader of Iran
- Formation: 1932; 94 years ago
- First holder: Commodore Gholamali Bayandor
- Deputy: Deputy commander

The Commander of the Iranian Navy (Persian: فرمانده نیروی دریایی ارتش) is the highest-ranking position of the Islamic Republic of Iran Navy, and has operational control and is responsible for overall operations of the navy. The current commander is Shahram Irani.

== List of officeholders ==
No.	Portrait	Commander	Took office	Left office	Time in office	Ref.
Commander of the Imperial Iranian Navy
1	Gholamali Bayandor	Commodore; Gholamali Bayandor (1898–1941)	5 November 1932	25 August 1941 †	8 years	–
2	Abdollah Zelli [fa]	Commodore; Abdollah Zelli	1946	1952	5–6 years	
3	Gholam-Hossein Bayandor [fa]	Commodore; Gholam-Hossein Bayandor	1952	July 1954	1–2 years	
4	Habibollah Shahin [fa]	Rear admiral Habibollah Shahin	July 1954	October 1960	6 years	
5	Farajollah Rasaei	Admiral; Farajollah Rasaei (1908–2002)	October 1960	5 October 1972	11–12 years	
6	Abbas Ramzi Attaie	Rear admiral Abbas Ramzi Attaie	5 October 1972	7 January 1976	3–4 years	
7	Kamal Habibollahi	Vice admiral Kamal Habibollahi (1930–2016)	7 January 1976	11 February 1979	3 years	
Commander of the Islamic Republic of Iran Navy
–	Afsari-Pur	Captain; Afsari-Pur; Acting	11 February 1979	16 February 1979	0 years	
1	Ahmad Madani	Commodore; Ahmad Madani (1929–2006)	16 February 1979	5 January 1980	0–1 years	
2	Mahmoud Alavi	Commodore; Mahmoud Alavi	5 January 1980	26 February 1980	0 years	
–	A. Tabatabaei	Commodore; A. Tabatabaei; Acting	26 February 1980	June 1980	0 years	
3	Bahram Afzali	Captain; Bahram Afzali (1937–1984)	June 1980	30 April 1983	2 years	
4	Esfandiar Hosseini	Captain; Esfandiar Hosseini (born 1937)	30 April 1983	27 June 1985	2 years	
5	Mohammad-Hossein Malekzadegan	Commodore; Mohammad-Hossein Malekzadegan (born 1944)	27 June 1985	30 October 1989	4 years	
6	Ali Shamkhani	Commodore; Ali Shamkhani (1955–2026)	30 October 1989	27 August 1997	7 years	
7	Abbas Mohtaj	Commodore; Abbas Mohtaj	27 August 1997	26 September 2005	8 years	
8	Sajjad Kouchaki	Commodore; Sajjad Kouchaki (born 1955)	26 September 2005	20 August 2007	1 years	
9	Habibollah Sayyari	Commodore; Habibollah Sayyari (born 1955)	20 August 2007	5 November 2017	10 years	
10	Hossein Khanzadi	Commodore; Hossein Khanzadi (born 1967)	5 November 2017	17 August 2021	3 years	
11	Shahram Irani	Commodore; Shahram Irani (born 1968)	17 August 2021	Incumbent	5 years	
