= Mohammad-Hossein Malekzadegan =

Iranian military officer

Timsar Mohammad-Hossein Malekzadegan
- Born: 28 September 1944 (age 82); Ardabil, Pahlavi Iran
- Military career
- Allegiance: Pahlavi Iran (1960s–1979); Iran (1979–1989)
- Branch: Imperial Iranian Navy (1960s–1979); Islamic Republic of Iran Navy (1979–1989)
- Service years: 1960s–1989
- Rank: Commodore
- Commands: Southern Fleet (1983–1985)
- Conflicts: Iran–Iraq War; Operation Praying Mantis

Mohammad-Hossein Malekzadegan (Persian: محمدحسین ملک‌زادگان; 28 September 1944) is an Iranian retired military officer who served as the Commander of the Islamic Republic of Iran Navy from 27 June 1985 to 30 October 1989. As of 2016, he was a board member of Chabahar Free Trade-Industrial Zone.

Malekzadegan ranked captain when he was appointed to the position on 27 June 1985, having previously served as the commander of the south fleet in the Persian Gulf and the Gulf of Oman since June 1983, and a deputy to the navy commander after 10 October 1980. According to Pierre Razoux, his appointment "reinvigorated" Iran's regular naval forces that were in a rivalry with the Navy of the Islamic Revolutionary Guard Corps.

Malekzadegan was in command during the Iranian Navy's second biggest one-day defeat: Operation Praying Mantis, the U.S. military's 18 April 1988 retaliation for the Iranian mining of the guided missile frigate Samuel B. Roberts.

== See also ==
- Iranian leaders of the Iran–Iraq War

Military offices
Preceded by Esfandiar Hosseini	Commander of the Islamic Republic of Iran Navy; 27 June 1985–30 October 1989	Succeeded by Ali Shamkhani
