= Task force =

Group or formation established to work on a single defined task or activity

A task force (TF) is a unit or formation established to work on a single defined task or activity. Originally introduced by the United States Navy, the term has now caught on for general usage and is a standard part of NATO terminology. Many non-military organizations now create "task forces" or task groups for temporary activities that might have once been performed by ad hoc (designated purpose) committees. In non-military contexts, working groups are sometimes called task forces.

== Military ==
=== Naval ===
The concept of a naval task force or simply task force is as old as navies, and prior to that time the assembly of ships for naval operations was referred to as fleets, divisions, or on the smaller scale, squadrons, and flotillas.

Before World War II, ships were collected into divisions derived from the Royal Navy's "division" of the line of battle in which one squadron usually remained under the direct command of the Admiral of the Fleet, one squadron was commanded by a Vice Admiral, and one by a Rear Admiral, each flying a different command flag, hence the terms flagship and flag officer. The names "Vice" (second) and "Rear" might have derived from sailing positions within the line at the moment of engagement. In the late 19th century ships were collected in numbered squadrons, which were assigned to named (such as the Asiatic Fleet) and later numbered fleets.

A task force can be assembled using ships from different divisions and squadrons, without requiring a formal and permanent fleet reorganization, and can be easily dissolved following completion of the operational task. The task force concept worked very well, and by the end of World War II about 100 task forces had been created in the U.S. Navy alone.

=== Army ===
In the army, a task force is a battalion-sized (usually, although there are variations in size) ad hoc unit formed by attaching smaller elements of other units. A company-sized unit with an armored or mechanized infantry unit attached is called a "company team." A similar unit at the brigade level is called a "brigade combat team" (BCT), and there is also a similar "regimental combat team" (RCT).

In the British Army and the armies of other Commonwealth countries, such units are traditionally known as battlegroups.

The 1st Australian Task Force (ATF) was a brigade-sized formation that commanded Australian and New Zealand Army units deployed to South Vietnam between 1966 and 1972. More recently, Australian task forces have been designated to cover temporary support elements such the battalion-sized force which operated in Urozgan Province, Afghanistan from 2006 to 2013. and the Northern Territory Emergency Response Task Force.

=== Other data regarding military US task forces ===
- Some task forces are named after their commander, such as Dunsterforce.
- Task Force Tarawa, the name given the 2nd Marine Expeditionary Brigade during the 2003 invasion of Iraq, Operation Iraqi Freedom. They were a Marine Air-Ground Task Force commanded by Brigadier General Richard Natonski, attached to the I Marine Expeditionary Force.
- Task Force Leatherneck is the name given the 2nd Marine Expeditionary Brigade during their 2009 operations in Afghanistan as part of Operation Enduring Freedom. They are a Marine Air-Ground Task Force commanded by Brigadier General Larry Nicholson, assigned to work under the International Security Assistance Force.
- US Army Task Force Lethal is the name for the 2-12 Infantry Battalion out of Fort Carson, Colorado. Part of the Army's 4th Infantry Division, 4th Brigade Combat Team, 2nd Battalion, 12th Infantry Regiment Task Force Lethal. Some of the heaviest firefights US troops were engaged in were in the Kunar province by teams of Task Force Lethal, there to replace members of the 173rd Airborne units and their outpost, Restrepo. Task Force Lethal is assigned to work as part of the International Security Assistance Force. Task Force Lethal prides itself as one of the Army's premier multi-task light infantry units that has trained at home in the mountainous regions of the Rocky Mountains in Colorado and excels at high-altitude warfare. The commandos of Task Force Lethal has remained one of the US Army's most elite task forces in the global war on terror since the start in 2003.
- Task Force 1-41 Infantry was a U.S. Army heavy battalion task force that took part in the Gulf War of January–March 1991. Task Force 1-41 Infantry was the first coalition force to breach the Saudi Arabian border on 15 February 1991 and conduct ground combat operations in Iraq, engaging in direct and indirect firefights with the enemy on 17 February 1991. It consisted primarily of the 1st Battalion, 41st Infantry Regiment; the 3rd Battalion, 66th Armor Regiment; and the 4th Battalion, 3rd Field Artillery Regiment, all being part of the 2nd Armored Division (Forward), based at Lucius D. Clay Kaserne, 24 kilometers (15 mi) north of Bremen, in the Federal Republic of Germany.

== Government and business ==
In government and business, a task force is a temporary group created to deal with a specific issue. It is usually made up of people chosen for their knowledge or experience in the subject.

A task force typically reviews the situation, identifies the main problems, considers possible ways to address them, and reports its findings to the organization that created it. The task force itself does not usually make final decisions.

In business, task forces are often formed to respond to urgent or time-limited problems. These groups are dissolved once their work is finished.

== See also ==
- Internet Engineering Task Force
- Joint task force
- Kampfgruppe
- Space Task Group
- Task management
