= A. Tabatabaei =

Iranian military officer

Timsar A. Tabatabaei
- Military career
- Allegiance: Iran
- Branch: Navy
- Rank: Commodore

A. Tabatabaei was an Iranian military officer who served as the acting Commander of the Islamic Republic of Iran Navy for a short period of time in summer 1980.

Military offices
Preceded by Mahmoud Alavi	Commander of the Islamic Republic of Iran Navy; 1980	Succeeded by Bahram Afzali
