= Houshang Seddigh =

Iranian fighter pilot (1948–2020)

Timsar Houshang Seddigh
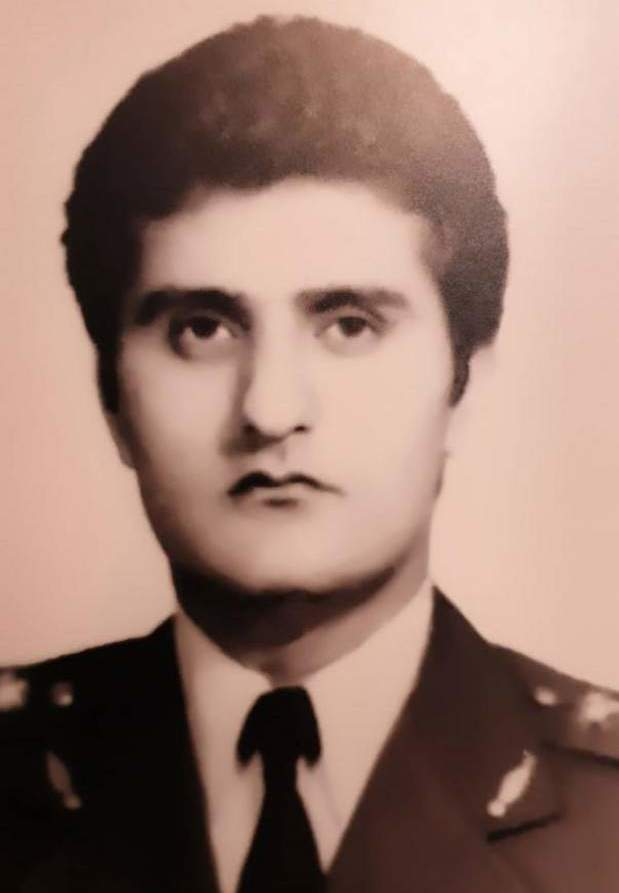
- Born: 8 February 1948; Tehran, Pahlavi Iran
- Died: 8 July 2020 (aged 72); Tehran, Iran
- Military career
- Allegiance: Pahlavi Iran (1970–1979); Iran (1979–2010)
- Branch: Air Force
- Service years: 1970–2010
- Rank: Brigadier General
- Commands: Iranian Air Force (1983–1986)
- Conflicts: Iran–Iraq War

Houshang Seddigh (Persian: هوشنگ صدیق; 8 February 1948 – 8 July 2020) was an Iranian fighter pilot. He served as the commander of the Air Force from 1983 to 1986.

Seddigh ranked colonel when he was appointed to the position on 28 November 1983. According to Pierre Razoux, he was more dynamic than his predecessor Mohammad-Hossein Moeinpour and enjoyed the confidence of the Iranian establishment. Seddigh was replaced by Mansour Sattari in 1986.

He died of COVID-19 in Tehran, Seddigh was 72.

== See also ==
- Iranian leaders of the Iran–Iraq War

Military offices
Preceded by Mohammad-Hossein Moeinpour	Commander of the Islamic Republic of Iran Air Force; 25 November 1983–30 January 1986	Succeeded by Mansour Sattari
Business positions
Unknown	Chief Executive Officer of Caspian Airlines; 2010–2013	Succeeded by Jamshid Torkan
Unknown	Chief Executive Officer of Zagros Airlines; 2013–2017	Succeeded by Abdolreza Mousavi
