= Sattar (disambiguation) =

Sattar or Settar is a given name and a surname.

Sattar or Settar may also refer to:

- Sattar (missile), Iranian missile
- Sattar snowtrout, species of fish
