= Task Force 37 =

Task Force 37 (TF 37) was a United States Navy task force active during World War II. Task Force numbers were in constant use, and there were several incarnations of TF 37 during World War II. The British Pacific Fleet was allocated as TF 37 in 1945.
