= Sattar (missile) =

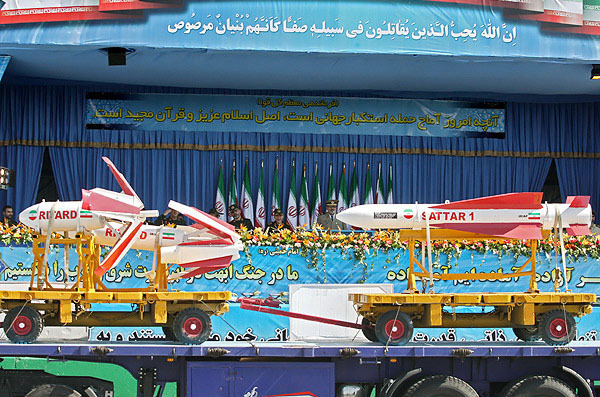
- Sattar 1 at a parade in 2010.
- Type: Laser-Guided Air-to-ground Missile
- Place of origin: Iran

Service history
- Used by: Iran
- Wars: Iran–Iraq War

Production history
- Designer: Islamic Republic of Iran Air Force
- Manufacturer: IRIAF (Islamic Republic of Iran Air Force)
- Variants: Sattar-1, Sattar-2, Sattar-3, and Sattar-4

Specifications
- Warhead: HE
- Warhead weight: 225 kg
- Maximum speed: Unknown
- Guidance system: laser-guided

Sattar (missile) (Persian: موشک ستار) is an Iranian laser-guided air-to-ground missile, which have been mentioned for utilizing on the fighters of "F-4 and F-5" in Islamic Republic of Iran Air Force, and is said "have been a sort of complement of the weapons of Islamic Republic of Iran's bomber fighters. This missile's name have been applied based on the name of Mansour Sattari, who was the Commander-in-Chief of the Islamic Republic of Iran Air Force. This missile is considered as the first laser guided Iran-made missile.

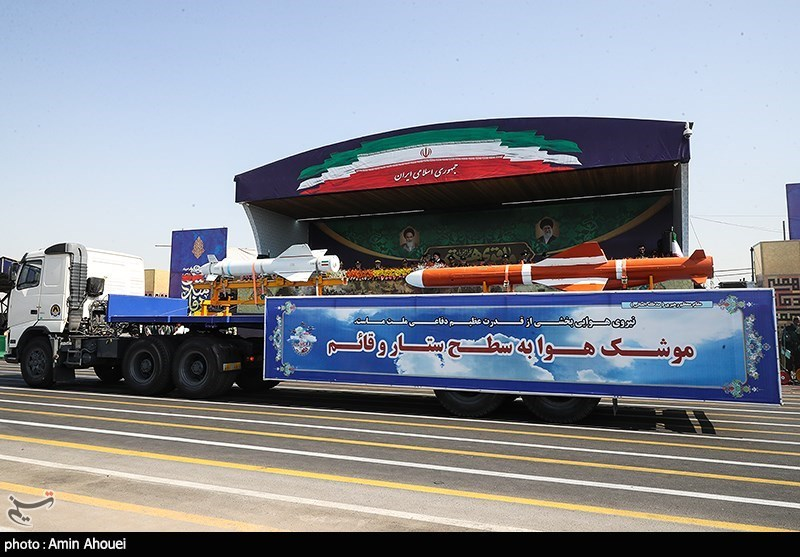
Sattar-4 in white

This air-to-ground missile consists of 4 types, namely: Sattar-1, Sattar-2 Sattar-3, and Sattar-4 (as the project of Asr-67). The Sattar-1 missile has a range of 15 to 20 km, but there is no information concerning its speed. Sattar-2 is a significantly improved form of its previous version; Sattar-3 is another improved version of Sattar laser-guided missile, which is said to have a warhead with 225 kg. Sattar-4 is the newest variant looks very similar to the GBU-12 Paveway II in appearance. It includes a laser guidance kit and is powered by a rocket engine.

== See also ==
- List of military equipment manufactured in Iran
- Islamic Republic of Iran Air Force
