= Mahmoud Alavi (military officer) =

Iranian military officer

Timsar Mahmoud Alavi
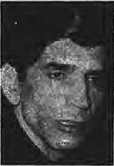
- Alavi in 1979
- Born: Seyyed Mahmoud Alavi
- Military career
- Allegiance: Iran
- Branch: Navy
- Service years: Before 1976; 1979–1980
- Rank: Commodore

Seyyed Mahmoud Alavi (Persian: محمود علوی) was an Iranian military officer who served as the Commander of the Islamic Republic of Iran Navy from 1979 to summer 1980. He was retired in 1976 under Kamal Habibollahi but was recalled to duty after Iranian Revolution. In July 1980, he was detained on charges of conspiracy and maintaining secret connections to the American officials. He was sentenced to eight years of imprisonment in February 1981 but was released on 27 July 1982.

== Personal life ==
Alavi was a non-religious person.

Military offices
Preceded by Ahmad Madani	Commander of the Islamic Republic of Iran Navy; 1979–1980	Succeeded by A. Tabatabaei
