= Naval task force =

Naval formation

The concept of a naval task force or simply task force is as old as navies, and prior to that time the assembly of ships for naval operations was referred to as fleets, divisions, or on the smaller scale, squadrons, and flotillas.

Before World War II, ships were collected into divisions derived from the Royal Navy's "division" of the line of battle in which one squadron usually remained under the direct command of the Admiral of the Fleet, one squadron was commanded by a Vice Admiral, and one by a Rear Admiral, each flying a different command flag, hence the terms flagship and flag officer. The names "Vice" (second) and "Rear" might have derived from sailing positions within the line at the moment of engagement. In the late 19th century ships were collected in numbered squadrons, which were assigned to named (such as the Asiatic Fleet) and later numbered fleets.

A task force can be assembled using ships from different divisions and squadrons, without requiring a formal and permanent fleet reorganization, and can be easily dissolved following completion of the operational task. The task force concept worked very well, and by the end of World War II about 100 task forces had been created in the U.S. Navy alone.

== United States Navy ==
In the United States Navy, task forces are generally temporary organizations composed of particular ships, aircraft, submarines, military land forces, or shore service units, assigned to fulfill certain missions. The emphasis is placed on the individual commander of the unit, and references to "Commander, Task Force" ("CTF") are common.

== History ==
In the U.S. Navy, task forces as part of numbered fleets have been assigned a two-digit number since March 1943, when Commander-in-Chief, United States Fleet, Admiral Ernest J. King assigned odd fleets to those in the Pacific, and even fleets to those in the Atlantic.

The Second Fleet was assigned the Atlantic Fleet, with the Fourth Fleet being assigned to the South Atlantic Force, the Eighth Fleet being assigned to Naval Forces, Northwest African waters, and the Twelfth Fleet assigned to the Naval Forces, Europe.

The United States Navy has used numbered task forces in the same way since 1945. The U.S. Department of Defense often forms a Joint Task Force if the force includes units from other services. Joint Task Force 1 was the atomic bomb test force during the post–World War II Operation Crossroads.

In naval terms, the multinational (Australia, United States, United Kingdom, Canada, and New Zealand) Combined Communications Electronics Board mandates through Allied Communications Publication 113 (ACP 113) the present system, which allocated numbers from 1 to 834. For example, the Royal Navy's Illustrious battle group in 2000 for Exercise Linked Seas, subsequently deployed to Operation Palliser, was Task Group 342.1. The French Navy is allocated the series TF 470–474, and Task Force 473 has been used recently for an Enduring Freedom task force deployment built around the French aircraft carrier Charles de Gaulle (R91). Task Force 142 is the U.S. Navy's Operational Test and Evaluation Force.

== Designation ==
The first digit of a task force designation is that of its parent fleet while the second is sequential. A task force may be made up of groups, each made up of units. Task groups within a force are numbered by an additional digit separated from the TF number by a decimal point. Task units within a group are indicated by an additional decimal. For example, "the third task unit of the fifth task group of the second task force of the Sixth Fleet would be numbered 62.5.3." This system extends further to task elements, individual ships in a task group. This arrangement was typically abbreviated, so references like TF 11 are commonly seen. Task units are sometimes nicknamed "Taffy", as in "Taffy 3" of Task Force 77, formally Task Unit 77.4.3. There is no requirement for uniqueness over time (e.g., the United States Seventh Fleet used TF 76 in World War II, and off Vietnam, and continued to use TF 70–79 numberings throughout the rest of the twentieth century, and up to 2012).

List

- Task Force 1 in the U.S. Atlantic Fleet. Used as Army/Navy Joint Task Force 1 during Operation Crossroads and then as Task Force 1 during Operation Sea Orbit (solely U.S. Navy).
- Task Forces 2–10 in the U.S. Atlantic Fleet.
- Task Force 11
- Task Force 16
- Task Force 17
- Task Force 18
- Task Force 19, the reinforcement of Iceland, in July 1941.
- Task Force 31
- Task Force 34
- Task Force 37, a Carrier battle group of the British Pacific Fleet redesignated from Task Force 57 in May 1945 conducting operations in the South China Sea, Ryukyu Islands and Japanese Inland Sea during World War II
- Task Force 38, a Carrier Battle Group of the US Navy which served in the Central Pacific during World War II
- Task Force 44, a combined USN and RAN force formed as a part of the South West Pacific Area (command) following the disbandment of the ANZAC Squadron.
- Task Force 57, a Carrier Battle Group of the British Pacific Fleet established in March 1945 as detailed above
- Task Force 58, a Carrier Battle Group of the US Navy which served in the Central Pacific during World War II
- Task Force 61
- Task Force 77—including "Taffy 3", or Task Unit 77.4.3, which gained fame during the Battle off Samar during the Battle of Leyte Gulf. Task Force 77 continued in existence, and was deployed to the Sea of Japan during the Korean War, and in the Gulf of Tonkin during the Vietnam War.
- Task Force 80
- Task Force 88
- Task Force 129, during the Bombardment of Cherbourg, 1944

== Royal Navy ==
Earlier in the Second World War, the British Royal Navy had already devised its own system of Forces. Letter rather than number designations were usually used.

== Lettered task forces ==
- Force A

Originally stationed at Malta took part in the Battle of Calabria in 1940 it transferred Trincomalee and was a component of the (fast force) of the Eastern Fleet during the Indian Ocean raid April to May 1942.

- Force B

Originally stationed at Malta, took part in the Battle of Calabria on 9 July 1940, took part in the Battle of Cape Spartivento, 27 November 1940, was involved in the First Battle of Sirte, 17 December 1941 it then moved to Trincomalee in March 1942 was a component (slow force) of the Eastern Fleet during the Indian Ocean raid April to May 1942.

- Force H

Formed as part of a number of hunting task groups on 5 October 1939 as a prelude to Battle of the River Plate, 13 December 1939 and part of the South America Division after which it was stationed at, Gibraltar, took part in Operation Catapult, 3 July 1940, took part in Operation Rheinübung 19 May – 15 June 1941.

- Force K

Part of a number of hunting task groups on 5 October 1939 as a prelude to Battle of the River Plate, 13 December 1939 based in Freetown it was then stationed at, Malta, took part in the Battle of the Tarigo Convoy, 16 April 1941, was involved in the First Battle of Sirte, 17 December 1941 then moved to Freetown in December 1941.

- Force Z, was stationed at Singapore, known for the destruction of its two capital ships in the Sinking of Prince of Wales and Repulse.

== Numbered task forces ==
- Force 1

Formed to deal with the Tirpitz Sortie against convoys PQ 12 and QP8, 6–13 March 1942.

- Force 62

Formed 13 May 1945 and took part in the Battle off Penang – the Battle of the Malacca Strait.

- Task Force 57, later renamed Task Force 37 (USN-allocated names for a Carrier Battle Group of the British Pacific Fleet in 1945).

== Post-World War II ==
During Operation Corporate of the Falklands War in 1982 Royal Navy forces assembled as Task Force 317, often referred to in general use as "The Task Force", to achieve sea and air supremacy in the Falklands Total Exclusion Zone, before the amphibious forces arrived.

== French Navy ==
The French Navy uses the name Task Force 473 to designate any power projection by the sea. This Task Force can be composed of a carrier battle group articulated around the aircraft carrier Charles de Gaulle, or it can be composed of an amphibious group articulated around a Mistral-class amphibious assault ship.

== Other ==
In Argentina, Navy Task Units of Task Group (Grupo de Tareas) G.T.3.3 were responsible for thousands of instances of forced disappearance, torture and illegal execution of Argentine civilians, many of whom were incarcerated in the Higher School of Mechanics of the Navy detention center during the 1976–1983 military dictatorship.

During the Falklands War in 1982 the Argentine Navy formed three smaller Grupos de Tareas (Task Groups) for pincer movements against the Royal Navy.

== See also ==
- Joint task force
