= Mansour Sattari =

Former commander of Iranian Air Force

Timsar Mansour Sattari
- Born: 16 June 1948; Qarchak, Pahlavi Iran
- Died: 5 January 1995 (aged 46); Isfahan International Airport, Isfahan, Iran
- Burial place: Behesht-e Zahra Cemetery
- Military career
- Allegiance: Pahlavi Iran (1967–1979); Iran (1979–1995)
- Branch: Imperial Iranian Air Force (1967–1979); Islamic Republic of Iran Air Force (1979–1995)
- Service years: 1967–1995
- Rank: Brigadier General
- Commands: Iranian Air Force (1986–1995); Deputy for Planning and Programs, of the air force (1985–1986); Deputy Commander for Air Defense Operations (1983–1985)
- Conflicts: Iran–Iraq War
- Awards: Order of Fath (1st class)
- Website: https://sattari.ir/

Mansour Sattari (Persian: منصور ستاری; also Romanized as Mansoor Sattari; 19 May 1948 – 5 January 1995) was an Iranian Air Force Brigadier general.

After serving his compulsory military service in the Army Artillery branch, he joined the Iranian Military Academy and entered the Imperial Iranian Air Force in 1965 in the Ground Force branch. In 1971 he was sent to United States to attend a course in Advanced Radar Control and Battle Management. Upon his return to Iran he was employed as a Radar Defence Control Officer. He implemented many innovative plans to improve radar and counterattack systems that was learnt from the United States Air Force, which proved helpful in disabling offensive capacities of the Iraqi Air Force during the Iran-Iraq War. In 1983 Mansour Sattari was appointed Deputy Operations Officer for the Islamic Republic of Iran Air Force counterattack headquarters, and in 1985, as the Deputy Planning Officer of IRIAF. In 1986, after reaching the rank of Colonel, he was appointed the Commander-in-Chief of the Islamic Republic of Iran Air Force. He held this position until his death. On January 5, 1995 an Islamic Republic of Iran Air Force (IRIAF) Lockheed JetStar crashed near Isfahan during an emergency landing, killing all 12 on board including General Mansour Sattari, commander of the IRIAF. He was 46 years old.

The Iranian Sattar missile and Shahid Sattari Aeronautical University were named after him.

== Childhood ==
He was born on 16 June 1948 in the village of Valiabad Qarchak in a middle-class family. His father's name was Hasan Sattari and a poet. His father died when he was nine years old. Mansour Sattari's father established a school and a Husayniyya.

== Film ==
Mansour's film with the former name of Ouj 110 is a film directed and written by Siavash Sarmadi and produced by Jalil Shabani, produced in 2009 and released in 2021. This film is participating in the 39th Fajr Film Festival. This film narrates the life of Mansour Sattari.

== Book ==
The most important books published on the biography of Air Marshal Mansour Sattari, are as follows:

- The Devotee of Love, a collection of memoirs, a review of Air Marshal Mansour Sattari's life, IRIAF Organization for Islamic Ethics in Politics 1996
- Legends, collected by Khalil abdolhoseini, Shahed Publication, 2001
- Eternal Models, by Abasalt rasooli, Shahed Publication 2006
- A Man Clothed with Clouds (based on the life of Mansour Sattari), by Hamid Tawabi Lawasani, Office of Resistance Literature and Art of the Shahed Publication, 2006
- Velvet of the Heavenly, by Shahed Publications, 2007
- The Man, by Shamsi Khowsrawi, NAHAJA Publications

Military offices
Preceded by Houshang Seddigh	Commander of the Islamic Republic of Iran Air Force; 30 January 1986–5 January 1995	Succeeded by Habib Baghaei
