= Imam Khomeini Naval University of Noshahr =

Military university in Nowshahr, Iran

Imam Khomeini Naval University
- دانشگاه علوم و فنون دریایی امام خمینی
- Seal of the University
- Type: Military Academy
- Established: 1980
- Affiliations: Islamic Republic of Iran Navy
- Commandant: Second Flotilla Admiral AboTaleb Motallabi
- Location: Noshahr, Mazandaran, Iran; 36°39′31″N 51°29′49″E
- Website: ekh.aja.ir

- Location within Iran

Imam Khomeini Naval University of Noshahr is the military academy of Islamic Republic of Iran Navy located in Noshahr, Mazandaran Province. Cadets of the academy achieve ensign rank upon graduation and join the Navy.

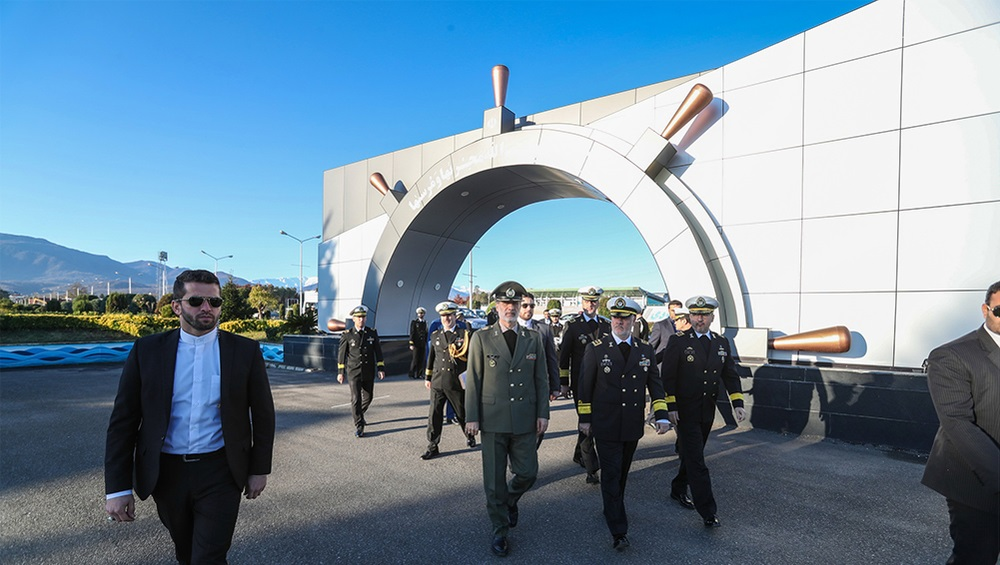
Naval University of Noshahr 2019
