= Omidiyeh Air Base =

- IATA: OMI; ICAO: OIAJ

Summary
- Airport type: Military
- Owner: Iranian Air Force; Islamic Revolutionary Guard Corps
- Operator: Islamic Republic of Iran Air Force; Islamic Revolutionary Guard Corps; Islamic Republic of Iran Air Defense Force
- Location: Omidiyeh, Iran
- Elevation AMSL: 85 ft / 26 m
- Coordinates: 30°50′07″N 049°32′06″E
- Interactive map of Omidiyeh Air Base

Runways
Direction	Length		Surface
Direction	m	ft	Surface
12R/30L	4,115	13,500	Asphalt
12L/30R	3,505	11,500	Asphalt

Omidiyeh Air Base (IATA: OMI, ICAO: OIAJ) is an Iranian air force base located near Omidiyeh in the Khūzestān Province.

== See also ==
- List of longest runways
