= Battle of Khorramshahr (1980) =

Iraqi victory in the Iran–Iraq War

First Battle of Khorramshahr
- Part of the Iraqi invasion of Iran in the Iran–Iraq War
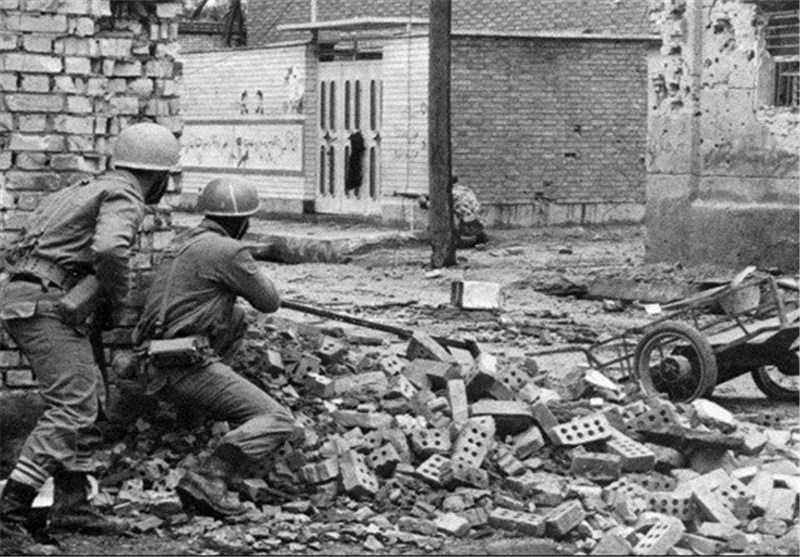
- Iranian soldiers defending Khorramshahr from invading Iraqi troops, 1980
Date	22 September 1980 – 10 November 1980 (1 month, 2 weeks and 5 days)
Location	Khorramshahr, Khuzestan, Iran 30.434°N 48.178°E
Result	Iraqi victory
Territorial changes	Iraq captures Khorramshahr and occupies it until the Second Battle of Khorramshahr.

Belligerents
Iran	Iraq: DRFLA

Commanders and leaders
Abolhassan Banisadr (President of Iran); Mohammad Reza Abbasi (Governor of Khorramshahr); Cpt. Hooshang Samadi (Commander, Takavar Marine Battalion); Gen. Mohammad Jahanara † (Commander, IRGC)	Saddam Hussein (President of Iraq); Izzat Ibrahim al-Douri (Deputy Chairman, Revolutionary Command Council); Gen. Saad Sheetteh (Eastern Command, Iraqi Ground Forces); Lt. Gen. Kamel Sajid (Commander, Iraqi Republican Guard); Col. Ahmad Zeidan (Commander, 3rd Army Division)

Units involved
See: § Order of battle	See: § Order of battle

Strength
3,000–5,000 (initial); 300 (near end)	12,000–20,000

Casualties and losses
7,000 killed and/or wounded overall (including civilians): 1,500 killed in combat; 80 Chieftain tanks destroyed	2,000 killed 6,000 wounded 200 armoured vehicles destroyed
- Location of Khorramshahr within Iran

The First Battle of Khorramshahr was a major battle in the Iran–Iraq War, beginning shortly after the Iraqi invasion of Iran in September 1980. Amidst the gruelling urban warfare in and around the city, Khorramshahr came to be referred to by the Iranians as Khuninshahr (Persian: خونین شهر, lit. 'City of Blood'), as both sides had suffered heavy casualties in combat. It was the single largest urban battle of the Iran–Iraq war.

Though Iraq ultimately captured the city, it had come at a high cost; the offensive into Khorramshahr, which took 34 days, drew an immense investment of troops, far beyond what Iraqi war plans had envisaged. The incredible delay allowed Iran to stabilize the frontlines at Dezful, Ahvaz, and Susangerd, consequently enabling the relatively swift mobilization of Iranian reinforcements into oil-rich Khuzestan, which Iraq had sought to annex. At the time of the Iraqi offensive, Khorramshahr was mainly being defended by the heavily outnumbered Takavaran, some units of the 92nd Armoured Division, the Pasdaran, and local civilian militias.

After two years under Iraqi occupation, the city was recaptured by Iran in the Second Battle of Khorramshahr, as part of Operation Beit ol-Moqaddas. Iraq's loss of Khorramshahr coincided with a larger Iranian offensive that would mark a turning point in the conflict, as Iran regained nearly all Iraqi-occupied territory and subsequently decided to continue the war with a counterinvasion.

== Prelude ==
Following the Islamic Revolution in 1979, elements of Arab anti-government groups began plotting in the Khuzestan province in an effort to have Khuzestan secede from Iran. Between October and September 1980, the city saw several incidents of bombings and terrorism amongst the population. This period also saw frequent border violations between Iran and Iraq. In fact, these violations and episodes of violence became so frequent, some locals believed the first days of the war were the result of worsening clashes.

Finally, on September 17, Iraqi president Saddam Hussein declared the 1975 Algiers Agreement null and void, thus setting the countdown to war, which would begin a few days later.

In the defense of Khorramshahr, the Iranians prepared a series of dikes on the city outskirts. The first dike held regular soldiers and the second dike held tanks, artillery, and anti-tank weapons. The Dej garrison of the Iranian Army was responsible for much of the city’s outer defences with a single company of British-made Chieftain tanks at their disposal.

== Combat ==
=== First phase ===
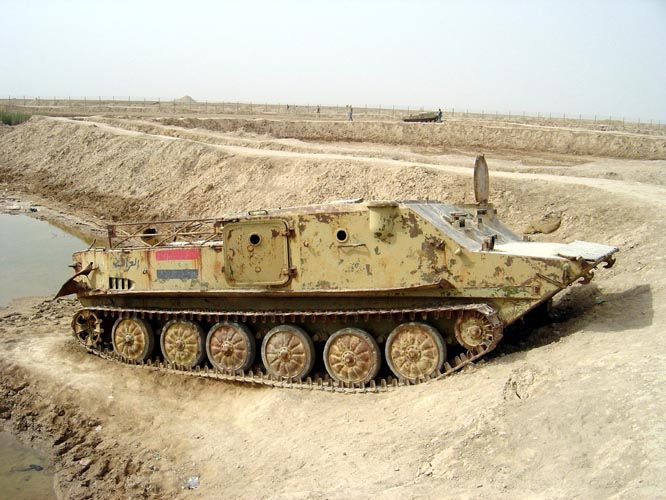
A knocked out Iraqi BTR-50 at Khorramshahr, Khuzestan

Overnight, 500 Iraqi tanks moved in towards the Khorramshahr-Ahvaz road. Outposts surrounding the city fell, but Iranian defenders managed to hold back several Iraqi tanks using recoilless rifles. While most of these outposts fell to Iraqi mechanized divisions by early morning, September 23, they gave the Iranians enough time to prepare defences in and around the city.

The Iraqis then proceeded to surround Khorramshahr in a crescent-like formation. The third and fourth day of the invasion consisted of Iraqi forces trying to capture and hold the Khorramshahr-Ahvaz road. However, the Iraqis faced a difficult enemy by the Iranian forces returning incessantly with rocket-propelled grenades and 106-millimeter guns. A large part of the Dej garrison was wiped out, but the battle contributed to the slow advance of the Iraqi forces.

According to Cdr. Hooshang Samadi, commander of the Iranian Navy's Takavar Battalion, the main problems during the initial days of the battle was the lack of unity in command, as well as lack of heavy weapons, ammunition, and ambulances.

By September 30, however, the Iraqis had cleared most of the dikes and captured the area around the city, cutting it off from both Abadan and the rest of the Khuzestan province. With this in their hands, the Iraqis stood at the gates of Khorramshahr. Up until that point, the Iranian forces consisted of the Dej Battalion soldiers, 700 Takavar Marines, 30 Pasdars and Basijis, and 185 personnel from Gendarmerie and Shahrbani. After September 30, 260 Officers' School cadets, 175 personnel from Havanirooz, 33 officers from other Army units, 25 Basijis from Tehran and 300 local people joined the fight. Pasdaran forces reportedly had to rely on G3s and M1 Garands, and the Gendarmerie's battalion was merely equipped with Brno vz. 24 bolt-action rifles.

At sunrise, a unit of sixty commandos became the first of thousands of Iraqi forces to enter Khorramshahr via the southernmost port. This force was repulsed by a number of Pasdaran defenders, eight of whom were killed. Even with this news, tanks and mechanized units of the Iraqi 3rd Armoured Division moved into the city later that day. One force moved in to occupy a slaughterhouse, another to take the railway station, and another to secure the Dej barracks in the Taleqani district. The Pasdaran awaited the Iraqis at these positions with light weapons, rocket propelled grenades, and Molotov cocktails. It was in the suburbs that the Iraqi attack stalled when they encountered Chieftain tanks. Local counterattacks by Pasdaran anti-tank teams turned back the Iraqi forces at several points. Later reports indicated in-fighting amongst Iraqi units, a sign of weakness for poorly trained conscripts. The sheer weight of the Iraqi tank force was effective against the anti-tank teams, but when Iranian armour was encountered, it stopped attacks cold. After fierce fighting, the Iraqis briefly occupied the slaughterhouse and the railway station, but were pushed back to previous positions on the outskirts of the city.

=== Second phase ===
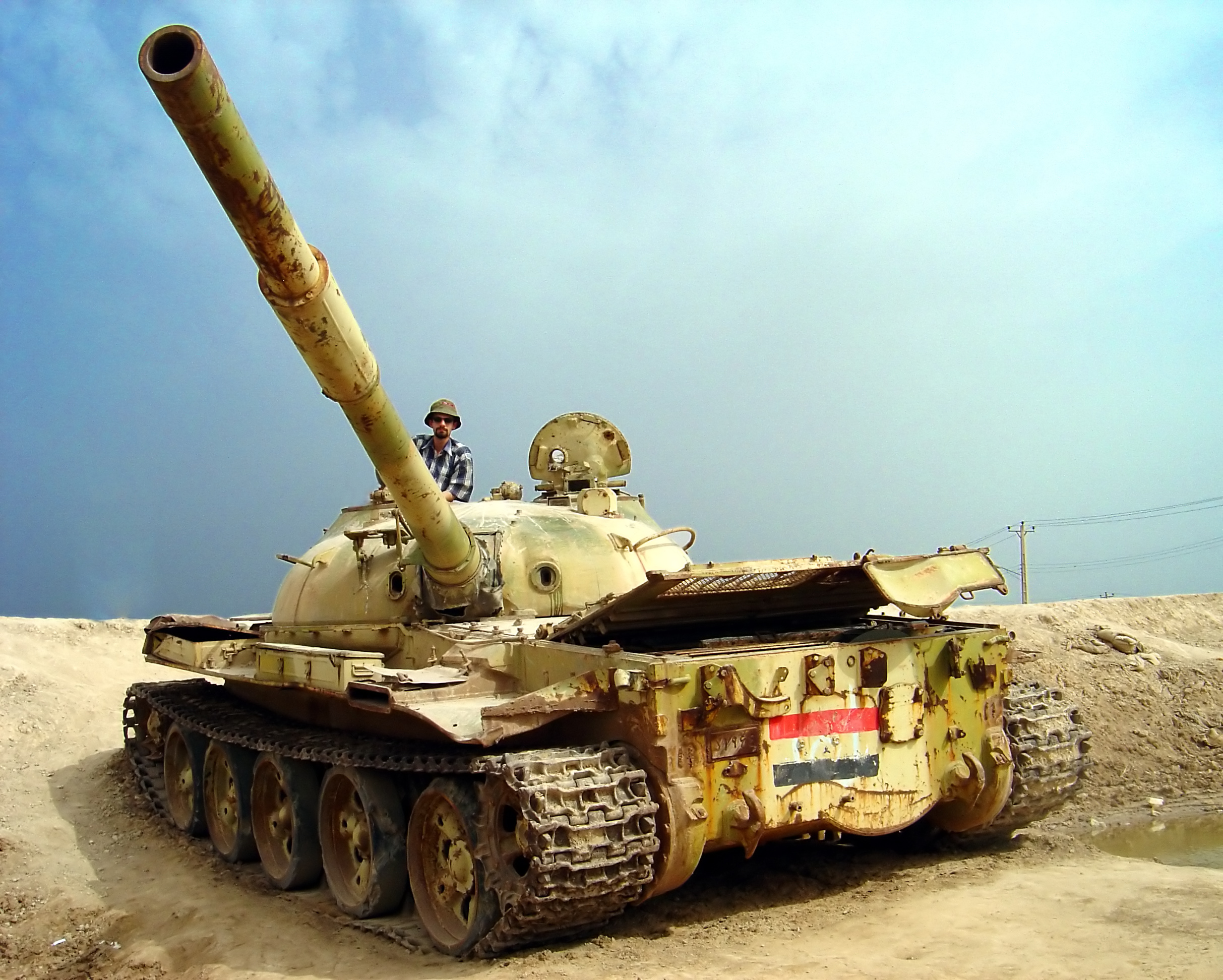
Iraqi T-62 tank wreckage at Khorramshahr, Khuzestan

In response to the first assault's heavy losses, the Iraqis recuperated on the outskirts of the city until their next attack on October 11. During that time, the Iraqis mercilessly shelled the city, under orders from Iraqi Colonel Ahmad Zeidan. The high command decided to send in additional commando units with armour providing backup.

On October 14, the Iraqis moved in once again, using the element of night attacks to advance troops, gain surprise, and place observation points in tall buildings. The Iranians would often use snipers at night, which slowed down the invading Iraqis. Due to repeated assaults of combined arms, the Iraqis managed to overtake the Iranian Chieftain tanks and Pasdaran units.

According to Hooshang Samadi, heavy Iraqi shelling occurred on 16 October, using BM-21s, Katyushas, 130 mm artillery and airstrikes.

With these tactics, the Iraqis achieved significant results with Special Forces and Commando units seizing the port and traffic police station. Armoured brigades seized the Dej barracks in the Taleqani district and gained control of the main highway leading to the Grand Mosque. Battles were often fought house-to-house, floor-to-floor, and room-to-room. Reports indicate that Iraqis would at times encounter Pasdaran and Basij units armed with anything from assault rifles to sticks and knives.

=== Third phase ===
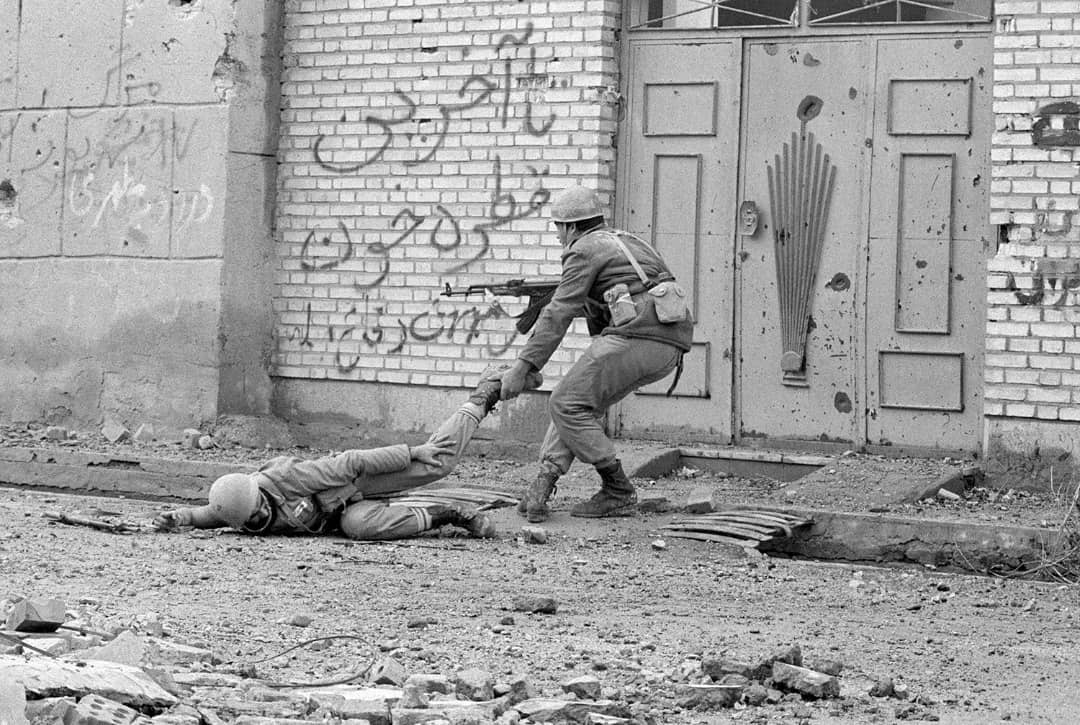
An Iranian soldier rescuing a wounded soldier. The Persian graffiti on the wall reads as "[We] will defend the motherland until the last drop of [our] blood".

The city centre in their sights by October 21, the Iraqis turned their objectives to seizing both the Government building and the bridge linking Khorramshahr to Abadan. In all, five battalions of infantry and Special Forces were to take part in seizing these objectives. The main initiative of the attack was to take these targets within forty-eight hours and effectively take control of Khorramshahr.

The forces dispatched in the early hours of October 24. Iranian forces fought viciously against the Iraqi invaders, but the bridge fell within five hours. Towards the Government building, Iraqi armour encountered heavy resistance in the surrounding streets and neighbourhoods. As the fighting moved closer toward the city center, Iranian Chieftains were reduced to a supporting role, since the tanks could not fire as effectively through the tight and narrow streets. Dwindling ammunition, repeated Iraqi assaults, and exhaustion also began to wear down the Iranian defenders. By the late afternoon of the 24th, the Iraqis briefly seized the Government building. They were surrounded and repulsed by Iranian forces, but attacked again during the night, effectively seizing control of the building.

All that remained was the Grand Mosque and a handful of Pasdaran and youth volunteers, and the remaining Takavar marines, who were 300 overall. Army and Pasdaran commanders began to issue final evacuation orders with warnings of impending airstrikes by the Iranian Air Force. Over the night of October 25 and 26, the remainder of the Iranian defenders proceeded to evacuate towards the Karun River. Iraqi artillery shelled them in their flight, but some youth volunteers stayed behind to cover their retreat. By early morning of November 10, the city of Khorramshahr was effectively under Iraqi control. When the Iraqi army captured the city, they stripped an Iranian civilian woman and hung her corpse from the bridge, and three Takavaran were killed as they retrieved her body.

== Aftermath ==
With the exception of the Iraqi military's presence, the city largely became a ghost town. Immediately after the start of the occupation, Iraqi soldiers looted goods from the Iranian ports and had them transferred to Basra. According to other claims, several Iranian women were raped across the city. Iraqi soldiers also reportedly set up iron beams and upright cars in the event of an airborne assault by Iranian paratroopers.

Due to both the strategically high loss of men and the harsh weather following the battle, the Iraqis were unable to conduct any further offensives against Iran. The city remained under Iraq's control until April 1982, when the Iranians launched Operation Beit ol-Moqaddas to recapture Khuzestan.

Khorramshahr had been completely devastated by Iraq, with very few buildings left intact. Other major urban centres such as Abadan and Ahvaz were also left in ruins, though nowhere nearly as bad as Khorramshahr. Even decades after the war's end, some buildings remain in ruins as a testimony to those who fought. Graffiti remains on the walls in spots, reading in Arabic "We come to Stay Forever." The city of Khorramshahr was one of the primary and most important front lines of the war and was declared a "martyr city" by supreme leader Ruhollah Khomeini.

== Order of battle ==
=== Iraq ===
- 3rd Armoured Division
  - 6th Armoured Brigade
  - 12th Armoured Brigade
  - 8th Mechanized Brigade
- 31st Special Forces Brigade
  - 2nd Battalion
  - 3rd Battalion
- 33rd Special Forces Brigade
  - 8th Battalion
  - 9th Battalion
- 66th Special Forces Brigade
- 5th Mechanized Division
  - 26th Armoured Brigade
    - al-Hassan Tank Battalion (attached to 33rd Special Forces Brigade)
  - 15th Armoured Brigade
    - 3rd Mechanized Battalion (the main body of which was attacking towards Ahwaz on flank of the 3rd AD)
- 49th Infantry Brigade
  - 1st Battalion
- 2nd Infantry Division
  - 4th Commando Battalion
  - 2nd Infantry Brigade
    - 2nd Battalion
    - 3rd Battalion
- 429th Infantry Brigade
  - 1st Battalion
- Jeish-Al-Shabi paramilitaries
  - Two battalions
- 23rd Infantry Brigade
  - 1st Battalion
- Republican Guard
  - 3rd Republican Guards Special Forces Battalion

=== Iran ===
Organized forces

(Commanded by President Abolhassan Banisadr)

- Islamic Republic of Iran Army
  - Ground Forces
    - 92nd Armored Division of Khuzestan
      - 165th Mechanized Battalion
      - 151st Fortress Battalion
    - 77th Infantry Division of Khurasan
      - 2nd Infantry Brigade of Quchan (not engaged)
  - Navy:
    - 1st Takavar Marine Battalion at Khorramshahr Naval Base
      Commanded by Cdr. Hooshang Samadi
- Islamic Republic of Iran Gendarmerie:
  - Coastal Gendarmerie Battalion of Khosroabad
- Islamic Revolutionary Guard Corps:
  - Revolutionary Guards form Shushtar, Abadan, Mahshahr, Omidiyeh and Isfahan
    Commanded by Mohammad Jahanara
- Shahrbani:
  - Shahrbani of Khorramshahr
    Commanded by Mohammad Reza Abbasi (Governor of Khorramshahr)

Volunteer forces

- Organization of Iranian People's Fedaian

== Bibliography ==
1. Khomeini's Forgotten Sons: Child Victims of Saddam's Iraq, by Ian Brown, Grey Seal Books, 1990
2. Essential Histories: The Iran–Iraq War, 1980–1988, by Efraim Karsh, Osprey Publishing, 2002
3. Ghost Town On The Gulf, Time, November 24, 1980
4. A Holy War's Troublesome Fallout, by William E. Smith, Time, June 7, 1982
5. Twarikh Guru Khalsa by Giani Gian Singh
6. Living in Hell: A True Odyssey of a Woman's Struggle in Islamic Iran Against Personal and Political Forces, by Ghazal Omid, Hardcopy, Park Avenue Publishers, Oklahoma, July 30, 2005
7. The Road to Khorramshahr, by William Drozdiak, Time, October 13, 1980
8. The Longest War, Dilip Hiro, Routledge, Chapman, & Hall, 1991

== See also ==
- 23 People
- Liberation of Khorramshahr
- Women in the Iran-Iraq War
