= 1st Marine Brigade (Iran) =

- تیپ یکم تفنگداران دریایی
- Country: Iran
- Allegiance: Supreme Leader of Iran
- Branch: Islamic Republic of Iran Navy
- Type: Takavar marines
- Role: Special operations Amphibious Assault
- Part of: Artesh
- Garrison/HQ: Bandar Abbas, Hormozgan province
- Engagements: Iran–Iraq War; Gulf of Aden Anti-Piracy Operations

1st Marine Imam Hossein Brigade (Persian: تیپ یکم تفنگداران دریایی امام حسین) is a marines brigade of Islamic Republic of Iran Navy based in Bandar Abbas, Hormozgan. The unit is one of top Takavar units among Iranian Armed Forces. The brigade operates in Persian Gulf and is able to operate 3,000 kilometers away from its HQ.

== Mission set ==
According to the US government, Islamic Republic of Iran Navy MARSOF "probably is trained in a variety of capabilities, including combat diving, parachuting, amphibious assault, airborne assault, underwater demolitions, special reconnaissance, and maritime visit, board, search, and seizure (VBSS) operations. IRIN SBS personnel are also capable of covert insertion from the IRIN's midget submarines.

== See also ==
- Special forces of Iran
- Sepah Navy Special Force
- Pakistan- Special Service Group (Navy)
- Turkey- Underwater Offence Group (SAT)
- Russia- Russian commando frogmen
- India- MARCOS
- Israel- Shayetet 13
- Indonesia- KOPASKA
- Indonesia- Taifib
- Vietnam- 126th Naval Special Operations Brigade of the Naval Special Operation Force
- China- 7th Marine Brigade of the PLANMC
- United States of America- Navy SEALS
- United States of America- Marine Raiders
- List of military special forces units
