= Battle of Khorramshahr (1982) =

Second battle of the Iran–Iraq War

Second Battle of Khorramshahr
- Part of the Iran–Iraq War and Operation Beit ol-Moqaddas
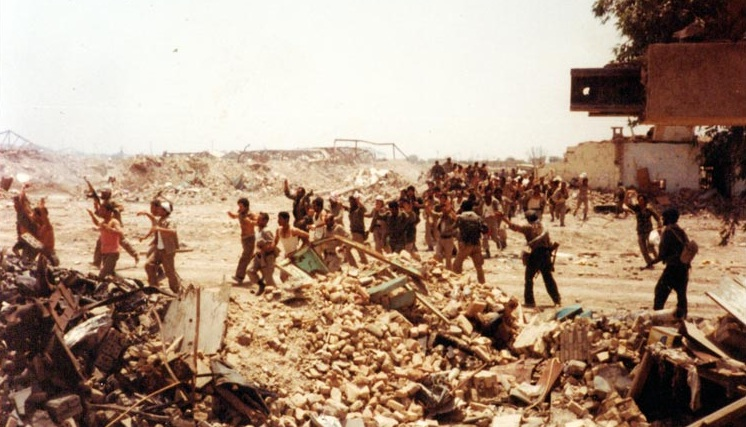
- Iranian forces directing captured Iraqi Army prisoners following the city's return to Iranian control, 1982
Date	24 April – 24 May 1982 (1 month)
Location	Khorramshahr, Khuzestan, Iran 30.434°N 48.178°E
Result	Iranian victory
Territorial changes	Iran retakes the southwestern port city of Khorramshahr and pushes Iraqi forces back to the international border

Belligerents
Iraq	Iran

Commanders and leaders
(Iraq) Ahmad Zeidan †; (Iraq) Salah al-Qadhi †; (Iraq) Juwad Shitnah (executed); (Iraq) Muhsin Abd al-Jalil †; (Iraq) Ali Hassan al-Majid	(Iran) Ali Sayad Shirazi; (Iran) Ahmad Motavaselian; (Iran) Hooshang Samadi; (Iran) Mohsen Rezaee

Strength
80,000 troops 100 tanks	100,000 troops 400 tanks

Casualties and losses
8,000 killed 15,000 wounded 19,000 captured 250 tanks, 300 APCs, 100 artillery pieces destroyed or captured (In all sectors)	12,000–15,000 killed 25,000 wounded 400 tanks destroyed (In all sectors)
- Location of Khorramshahr within Iran

The Second Battle of Khorramshahr, also known in Iran as the Liberation of Khorramshahr (Persian: آزادسازی خرمشهر, romanized: Âzâdsâzī-ye Khorramshahr) was the Iranian recapture of the city of Khorramshahr on 24 May 1982, during the Iran–Iraq War. The city had been captured by the Iraqis earlier in the war, on 26 October 1980, shortly after the Iraqi invasion of Iran. The successful retaking of the city was part of Iran's Operation Beit ol-Moqaddas. It is perceived as a turning point in the war; and the liberation of the city is annually celebrated in Iran on 24 May.

== Battle ==
Following its capture, the Iranian city of Khorramshahr remained under Iraqi control until April 1982, when the Iranians launched Operation Beit ol-Moqaddas to recapture the occupied parts of the province of Khuzestan. The initial phase of the operation took place from 24 April to 12 May 1982 and consisted of approximately 70,000 Iranian Army troops and Revolutionary Guards, who pushed the Iraqi forces out of the Ahvaz–Susangerd area while suffering many casualties. The Iraqis withdrew to Khorramshahr and, on 20 May, launched a vigorous counter-attack against the Iranians that failed. Iran then launched an all-out assault on Khorramshahr and overran two Iraqi defensive lines in the Pol-e Now and Shalamcheh region. The Iranians concentrated near the Shatt al-Arab (known as the Arvand Rud in Iran) waterway, besieged Khorramshahr, and recaptured the city on 24 May 1982, after two days of intense and bloody fighting.

The mobile bridge constructed by the Iraqi army, connecting the islands of Bowarin and Umm Rasas, to the southern shore of the Arvand River, was rendered inoperable by the fighters of the Islamic Republic of Iran and the Iraqi forces were unable to use it.

== Aftermath and legacy ==
In retaking Khorramshahr, the Iranians captured approximately 19,000 soldiers from a now-demoralized Iraqi Army. Saddam Hussein was shocked and infuriated by the defeat. After the defeat, Saddam Hussein executed several of his top generals, such as the commander of the 9th Armoured Division.

Calls for a United Nations-mandated ceasefire in the Iran–Iraq War were made three days after the liberation of Khorramshahr, and officials of both countries began discussing such a possibility.

The anniversary of the liberation of Khorramshahr is annually observed in Iran on 24 May.

Sevom Khordad, an Iranian air defence system, is named after the battle.

2000 rial banknote of Iran, depicting Iranian forces after the liberation of Khorramshahr.
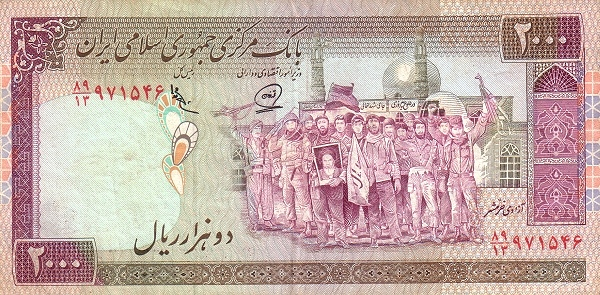

== In popular culture ==
The liberation of Khorramshahr is the subject of a number of wartime films, such as 1982's Another Growth by Homayun Purmand, the Pasdaran Army (Revolutionary Guard) Television Unit's 1983 documentary Recapturing Khorramshahr, and Kiumarth Monazzah's Forty Witnesses – The Second Narrative: Liberation of Khorramshahr (1983).

A popular sad Persian song, "Mammad Naboodi" (ممد نبودی, meaning "Mammad [colloquial variant of Mohammad], you were not there [to see the city liberated]"), by Gholam Koveitipoor, is about Mohammad Jahanara, the Revolutionary Guard commander who was one of the last few Iranians to leave Khorramshahr when it fell to the Iraqis. He subsequently fought in the Siege of Abadan and lead Iranian forces to recapture Khorramshahr; but he died on 24 May, in a plane crash, before the liberation of the city.

== Gallery ==
Pictures from the moments of the liberation of Khorramshahr

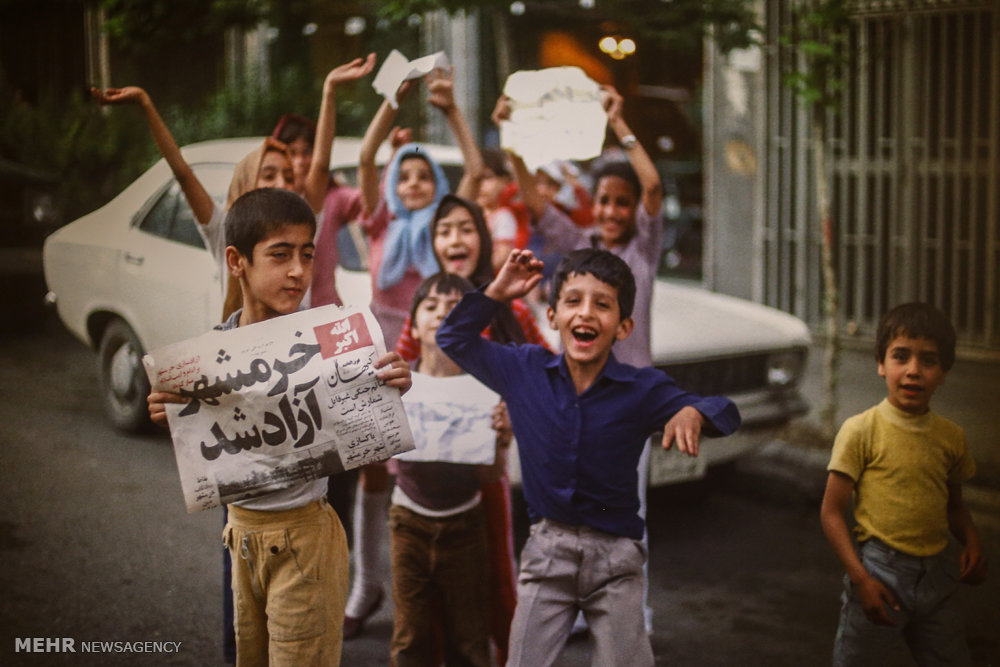
Iranians celebrating the liberation of Khorramshahr

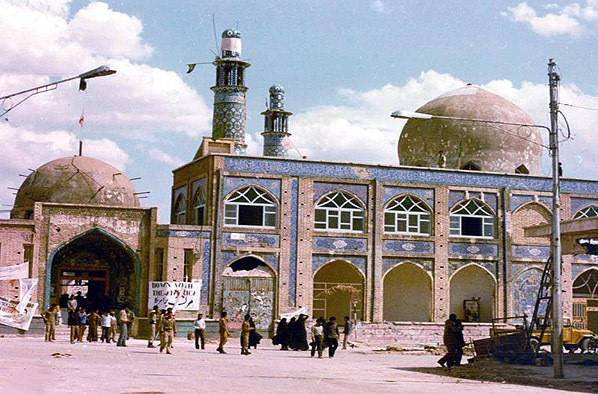
Khorramshahr Grand Mosque after the liberation by Iranian forces

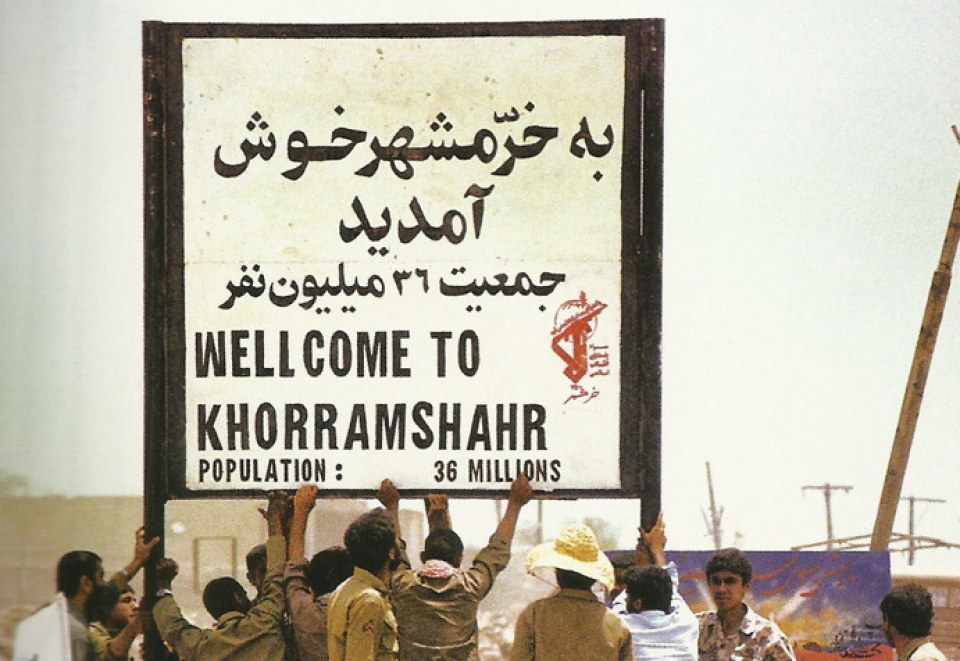
Iranian forces celebrate after liberating Khorramshahr

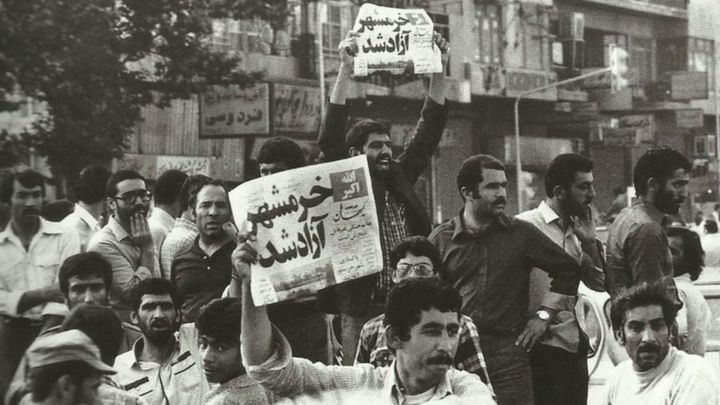
Iranian people commemorating the retaking of Khorramshahr

== See also ==
- Karun River
- Chess with the Doomsday Machine
- Eternal Fragrance
- Noureddin, Son of Iran
- One Woman's War: Da (Mother)
- Liberation of Susangerd
- History of Khuzestan province
- Abadan building collapse
- 2005–06 Ahvaz bombings
- Al-Ahwaz theater (Zanj Rebellion)
- Apollodorus of Susiana
- Battle of the Uxian Defile
- Battle of Ulai
- Operation Beit ol-Moqaddas
- Operation Cedar
- Cinema Rex fire
