= Ali Shahbazi =

Commander-in-chief of the Iranian Army

Timsar Ali Shahbazi
- علی شهبازی
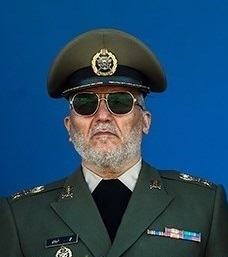
- Shahbazi in 2016

Head of the Military Advisers Group to the Commander-in-Chief of the Armed Forces
- Incumbent
- Assumed office 21 May 2000
- President: Mohammad Khatami; Mahmoud Ahmadinejad; Hassan Rouhani; Ebrahim Raisi; Mohammad Mokhber (acting); Masoud Pezeshkian
- Supreme Leader: Ali Khamenei; Mojtaba Khamenei
- Preceded by: Mohammad Salimi

Commander-in-chief of the Islamic Republic of Iran Army
- In office 30 September 1998 – 21 May 2000
- President: Mohammad Khatami
- Supreme Leader: Ali Khamenei
- Preceded by: Himself
- Succeeded by: Mohammad Salimi

Chief of the Joint Staff of the Islamic Republic of Iran Army
- In office 7 May 1988 – 30 September 1998
- President: Ali Khamenei; Akbar Hashemi Rafsanjani; Mohammad Khatami
- Supreme Leader: Ruhollah Khomeini; Ali Khamenei
- Preceded by: Esmaeil Sohrabi
- Succeeded by: Office Abolished

Chairman of the Board of Trustees of the Supreme National Defense University
- In office 1992–1998
- President: Akbar Hashemi Rafsanjani
- Supreme Leader: Ali Khamenei
- Preceded by: Office Established
- Succeeded by: Hassan Firouzabadi

Coordinating Deputy of the Joint Staff of the Army
- In office 1984–1988
- President: Ali Khamenei
- Prime Minister: Mir-Hossein Mousavi
- Supreme Leader: Ruhollah Khomeini
- Preceded by: ?
- Succeeded by: ?

Personal details
- Born: 25 February 1946 (age 80) Qom, Pahlavi Iran

Military service
- Allegiance: Pahlavi Iran (1968–1979); Iran (1979–2000)
- Branch/service: Ground Forces
- Years of service: 1968–present
- Rank: Major General
- Battles/wars: Dhofar rebellion Iran–Iraq War

Ali Shahbazi (Persian: علی شهبازی; born February 25, 1946) is the former commander-in-chief of the Iranian Army.

== Early life ==
Ali Shahbazi was born in 1946 in the city of Qom. Upon his appointment as Chief of the Joint Staff of the Army in May 1988, he was one of the youngest commanders in the army.

After completing his secondary education, he entered the Officer's Academy. He completed various military courses, including basic military training, advanced training, and the Command and Staff College

== Career ==
He entered the Officer's Academy in 1968 and reached the rank of Colonel in 1984.

Shahbazi was appointed by Rafsanjani as the chief of staff of the Iranian Armed Forces Joint Staff on 7 May 1988. Shahbazi was promoted to Brigadier General in May 1988 and reached the rank of Major General in February 1991. Shahbazi was the first commander-in-chief of the Iranian Army. He was succeeded by major general Mohammad Salimi when he resigned from office in May 2000. Then he became the head of the Trustees Supreme National Defense University and chief military advisor of Ali Khamenei.

== See also ==
- List of Iranian two-star generals since 1979

Military offices
Preceded by Mohammad Salimi	Head of the Military Advisers Group to the Commander-in-Chief of the Armed Forces; 21 May 2000–present	Incumbent
Preceded by Esmaeil Sohrabi	Chief of the Joint Staff of the Islamic Republic of Iran Army; 7 May 1988–30 September 1998	Office demoted
First Office established	Commander-in-Chief of the Islamic Republic of Iran Army; 30 September 1998–21 May 2000	Succeeded by Mohammad Salimi
First Office established	Chairman of the Board of Trustees of the Supreme National Defense University; 1992–1998	Succeeded by Hassan Firouzabadi
Preceded by New Office	Coordinating Deputy of the Joint Staff of the Army; 1984–1988	Succeeded by ?
