= Hassan Firouzabadi =

Iranian military officer (1951–2021)

Sardar Hassan Firouzabadi
- حسن فیروزآبادی
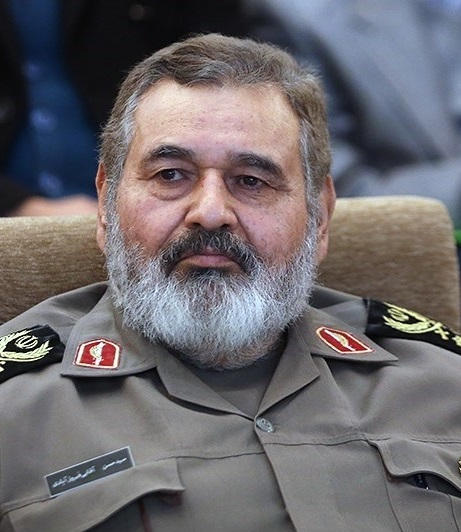
- Firouzabadi in 2019

1st Chief of the General Staff of the Iranian Armed Forces
- In office 26 September 1989 – 28 June 2016
- President: Akbar Hashemi Rafsanjani; Mohammad Khatami; Mahmoud Ahmadinejad; Hassan Rouhani
- Supreme Leader: Ali Khamenei
- Preceded by: Mir-Hossein Mousavi
- Succeeded by: Mohammad Bagheri

1st Deputy Chief of the General Staff of the Iranian Armed Forces
- In office 2 June 1988 – 26 September 1989
- President: Ali Khamenei; Akbar Hashemi Rafsanjani
- Prime Minister: Mir-Hossein Mousavi
- Supreme Leader: Ali Khamenei
- Preceded by: Office Established
- Succeeded by: Mohammad Forouzandeh

Chairman of the Board of Trustees of the Supreme National Defense University
- In office 1996 – 28 June 2016
- President: Akbar Hashemi Rafsanjani; Mohammad Khatami; Mahmoud Ahmadinejad; Hassan Rouhani
- Supreme Leader: Ali Khamenei
- Preceded by: Ali Shahbazi
- Succeeded by: Mohammad Bagheri

Deputy Commander of Khatam al-Anbiya Central Headquarters
- In office ?–?
- Supreme Leader: Ali Khamenei
- Preceded by: ?
- Succeeded by: Gholam Ali Rashid

Chairman of the Center for Strategic Defence Research
- In office 1991–?
- Supreme Leader: Ali Khamenei
- Preceded by: Office Established
- Succeeded by: ?

Deputy Prime Minister of Iran for Defense Affairs
- In office 1985 – 16 August 1989
- President: Ali Khamenei
- Prime Minister: Mir-Hossein Mousavi
- Supreme Leader: Ruhollah Khomeini; Ali Khamenei
- Preceded by: Office Established
- Succeeded by: Office Abolished

President of the Iranian Red Crescent Society
- In office 1981–1983
- Preceded by: Ali Behzadnia
- Succeeded by: Seifollah Vahid Dastjerdi

Personal details
- Born: 3 February 1951 Mashhad, Pahlavi Iran
- Died: 3 September 2021 (aged 70) Tehran, Iran
- Resting place: Imam Reza Shrine
- Awards: Order of Nasr (1st class) Order of Independence

Military service
- Allegiance: Iran
- Branch/service: IRGC
- Years of service: 1988–2016
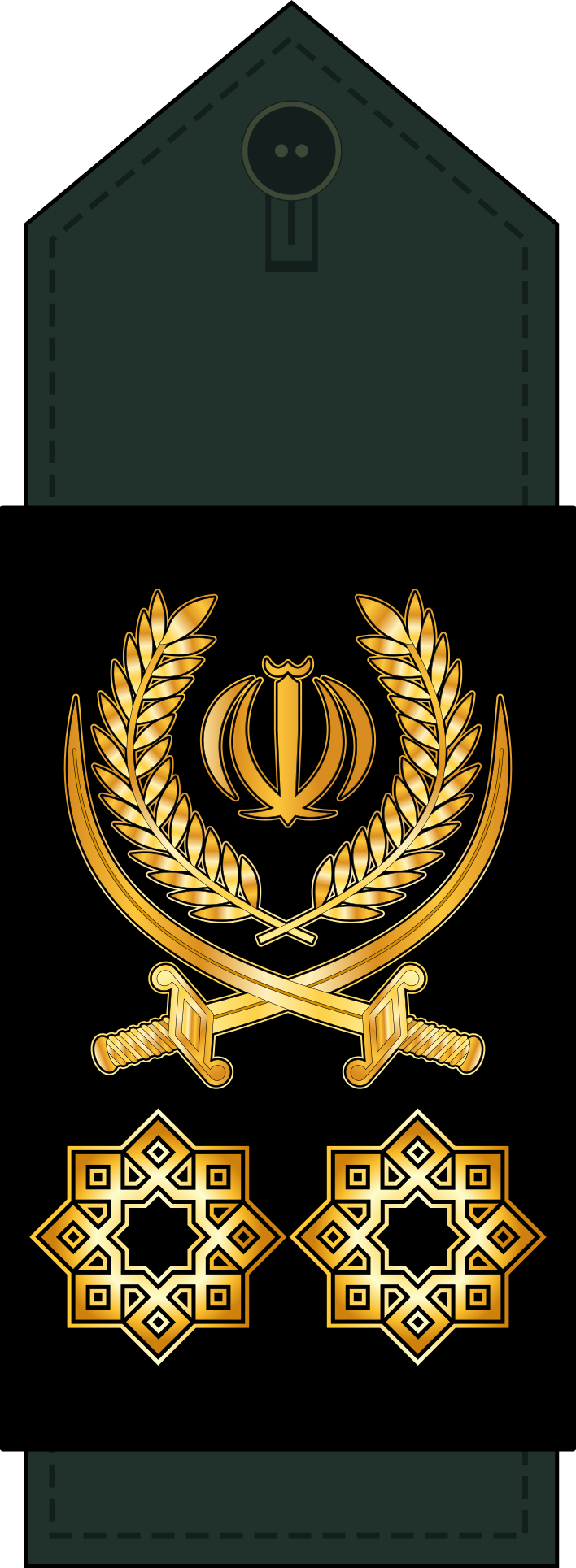
- Rank: Major general
- Battles/wars: Iran–Iraq War; KDPI insurgency (1989–1996); War in Afghanistan (2001–2021); 2001 uprising in Herat; Insurgency in Sistan and Balochistan; Syrian civil war; Iranian intervention in Syria; War in Iraq (2013–2017); Iranian intervention in Iraq; Iran–PJAK conflict; Western Iran clashes

Hassan Aghaee Firouzabadi (Persian: حسن آقایی فیروزآبادی; 3 February 1951 – 3 September 2021) was an Iranian military officer. He served as the Chief-of-Staff of the Iranian Armed Forces—the most senior military authority in Iran—from 1989 to 2016. After that, he was appointed a senior military advisor to the Supreme Leader of Iran and a member of the Expediency Discernment Council.

== Early life ==
Firouzabadi was born on 3 February 1951 in the town of Malabad, in Mashhad, Iran, to religious parents who came from Yazd. He studied at the Ferdowsi University of Mashhad, graduating in 1980, one year after the Iranian Revolution. He then took a part in the Iran–Iraq War and rose in prominence. He was in charge of the industrial war engineering, and the committee for the construction of surface-to-surface missiles. After the end of the war on 25 October 1989, Ali Khamenei appointed him head of the General Staff.

== Military career ==
Before he was appointed the chief-of-staff, Firouzabadi had no previous military experience from either the Islamic Revolutionary Guard Corps (IRGC), or the Islamic Republic of Iran Army (Artesh), and he went by the title Basiji. On 17 April 1995, Supreme Leader Ali Khamenei granted him the rank of major general, practically the highest military rank available in Iran. According to a report published by The Washington Institute for Near East Policy, he was credited with "leading the IRGC from a war-ravaged organization to a hybrid conventional-asymmetric military force overshadowing the still-lagging Artesh. He also oversaw a growing military industry that produced a wide range of products amid international sanctions, from ammunition to space rockets".

=== Controversy ===
Following the death of Kavous Seyed-Emami in custody in 2018, Firouzabadi claimed that “Several years ago, some individuals came to Iran... In their possessions were a variety of reptile desert species like lizards, chameleons... We found out that their skin attracts atomic waves and that they were nuclear spies who wanted to find out where do we (inside the Islamic Republic of Iran) have uranium mines, and where are we engaged in atomic activities”. Several scientists dismissed his remarks as absurd.

In October 2011, he was banned from entering the European Union for alleged violation of human rights.

== Political positions ==
Firouzabadi expressed anti-American sentiment, rejecting a letter sent to him by the US Congress and said that "the scourge of Americans were a threat to the Revolution."

Firouzabadi was a supporter of former president Mahmoud Ahmadinejad's ideology and called on the Higher National Defense University to add to his ideology. Defending the continuation of Ahmadinejad's presidency, he also said in a speech that provoked criticism from most of the presidential candidates: "Now some believe that the distance that groups of politicians have created between the government and the people has been successful and has been able to attract the attention of the people. Therefore, in this presidential election, they can nominate a new presidential candidate and end the issue of Ahmadinejad. But this does not happen, they make mistakes". He further criticized former president Mohammad Khatami. However, towards the end of Ahmadinejad's presidency, he became critical of Ahmadinejad's positions.

== Death ==
According to media reports on 3 September 2021, Firouzabadi died at the age of 70 from COVID-19, amid the COVID-19 pandemic in Iran. A funeral attended by senior military commanders was held in Tehran on Saturday 4 September.

== See also ==
- List of Iranian two-star generals since 1979

Military offices
Preceded by Mir-Hossein Mousavi as Head of Commander-in-Chief Headquarters	Chief-of-Staff of the Iranian Armed Forces; 26 September 1989 – 28 June 2016	Succeeded by Mohammad Bagheri
New title	Deputy Head of Commander-in-Chief's Headquarters; 1988 – 26 September 1989	Succeeded by Mohammad Forouzandeh as Deputy Chief of the General Staff of Iranian Armed Forces
Preceded by Ali Shahbazi	Chairman of the Board of Trustees of the Supreme National Defense University; 1996 – 2016	Succeeded by Mohammad Bagheri
Preceded by ?	Deputy Commander of the Khatam al-Anbiya Central Headquarters ? – ?	Succeeded by Gholam Ali Rashid
Political offices
New title	Deputy Prime Minister for Defense Affairs; 1985 – 16 August 1989	Succeeded by Office Abolished
Academic offices
New title	Chairman of the Center for Strategic Defence Research; 1991–?	Succeeded by ?
Non-profit organization positions
Preceded by Ali Behzadnia	President of the Iranian Red Crescent Society; 1981–1983	Succeeded by Seifollah Vahid Dastjerdi
