= ATV-500 =

The ATV-500 is an all-terrain vehicle (ATV) used by the Iranian ground forces to increase the speed of counteraction.

This four-wheeled vehicle has a single-cylinder engine with a volume of 500 cc, four-stroke and liquid-cooled. The suitable features of the ATV-500, including small dimensions, suitable speed and high mobility, and high stability movement capabilities, especially in uneven terrain (due to the deployment of the vehicle on four wheels), have provided it with a variety of applications.

The possibility of using it in rapid response and agile motorized combat patrol units is one of these capabilities, which, considering the asymmetric war environment and the commanders' desire to make operational units agile, this vehicle plays an appropriate role. The ATV-500 can carry a variety of semi-heavy weapons such as 7.62 mm machine guns, light RPG rocket launchers, commando mortars, surface-to-air missiles such as the Missagh and Sahand missiles, as well as anti-tank missiles such as the Dragon and Malyutka, communication and rescue equipment.

These Iranian ATVs are manufactured by the Ministry of Defence and Armed Forces Logistics and have been mass-produced and provided to operational units of the Army and the Revolutionary Guard. ATVs were first publicly displayed in large numbers in the parade and have since become a fixture in parades in Tehran and other cities.

== Features ==
This ATV is equipped with a single-cylinder engine with a volume of 500 cc, four-stroke and liquid-cooled. The various features of the ATV-500, including small dimensions, suitable speed and high mobility, and high stability, especially on uneven terrain (due to the vehicle being mounted on four wheels), have provided it with a variety of applications.
