= Shahla and Nasreen Kaabi =

Two Iranian nurse sisters who were executed

Shahla and Nasreen Kaabi شهلا و نسرین کعبی
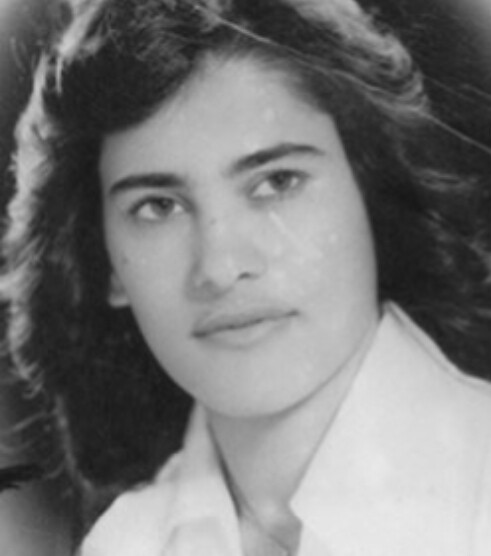
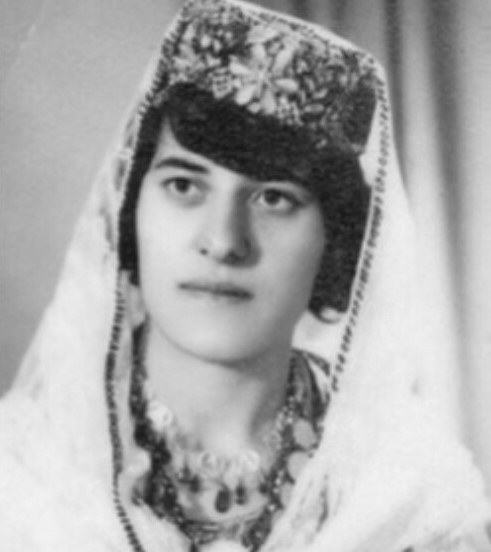
- Shahla (left) and Nasreen (right)
- Born: 1951 and 1946; Saqqez, Kurdistan province, Pahlavi Iran
- Died: August 27, 1980 (aged 34 and 29); Sanandaj, Kurdistan province, Islamic Republic of Iran
- Cause of death: Execution by firing squad
- Other names: Nasreen's other name was "Fereshteh" (فرشته) .
- Occupation: Nursing
- Known for: Execution for providing medical aid to anti-revolutionary patients

Shahla (شهلا) and Nasreen Kaabi (نسرین کعبی) were two Iranian Kurdish sisters from Saqqez who served as nurses. On August 29, 1980, they were executed on charges of "participating in the conflicts in Kurdistan," "collaborating with attackers," and aiding "counter-revolutionaries". Their alleged crime stemmed from providing medical treatment to individuals deemed as counter-revolutionaries at Saqqez Hospital. Their death sentences were decreed by Sadegh Khalkhali and carried out at Sanandaj barracks. At the time of their execution, Shahla was 34 years old, and Nasrin was 29.

== Arrest and exile ==
Shahla and Nasreen Kaabi were initially arrested in autumn 1979 and subsequently exiled to Qazvin. During their time in exile, they also spent some months in Kerman. However, in the spring of 1980, following negotiations between government officials and the Kurdish delegation, they were allowed to return to Kurdistan along with other exiles. Their reprieve was short-lived as they were arrested for the second time on June 14, 1980. They endured three months of imprisonment in Saqqez, Evin, and Sanandaj prisons.

== Execution ==
The death sentence for the Kaabi sisters, along with another group, was delivered on the night of August 27, 1980, at the Sanandaj barracks. No formal court proceedings or defense were conducted. At approximately 4:30 a.m., the execution was carried out at the same location. Recalling the harrowing scene of the Kaabi sisters' execution, one of the prisoners who witnessed the event recounted:

The jailer escorted Nasreen and her elder sister Shahla from the prison without any exchange. The two sisters stood side by side, their hands clasped, pressed against the wall. A guard brought two pieces of black cloth to cover their eyes... Nasreen resisted; she refused to be blindfolded. However, her older sister accepted the blindfold. When the guard taunted her with a scornful laugh, 'You're scared, huh?' she calmly responded, 'Of course not. I simply don't want to witness my sister's death.' At this, Nasreen also requested to be blindfolded.

== Reactions ==
Following the execution, the Islamic Republic newspaper claimed that Shahla and Nasreen Kaabi were charged with "participation in recent conflicts" and "collaboration with attackers." However, their families later revealed that during their arrest, authorities accused them of providing medical treatment to counter-revolutionaries at Saqez Hospital.

On August 31, 2001, Komalah published a tribute to Shahla and Nasreen Kaabi. The Prison Book (edited by Nasser Mohajer, volume 1, page 189) includes a dedicated paragraph to the Kaabi sisters.

== Fate of the Kaabi Family ==
The Kaabi family, along with 26 other families who had Peshmerga children, was deported to the Mohammad-Javad Bahonar Camp in Fuladshahr, Isfahan, on August 18, 1982. After four years, these families were permitted to return to Kurdistan; however, the Kaabi family opted to remain in Sanandaj, the capital of the province, instead of returning to Saqqez.

Several years later, on February 19, 1986, Sediq Kaabi, one of the brothers of Shahla and Nasreen Kaabi, who was a member of the Komalah Party and incarcerated at the time of their execution, was killed in an armed conflict with the forces of the Islamic Republic. Another brother of the family, Mohammad Kaabi, faced numerous imprisonments and endured lengthy periods of incarceration.
