= Mohammad Hossein Jalali =

Iranian military official

- محمدحسین جلالی

Deputy for Logistics and Industrial Research of the General Staff
- In office 1997–2000
- President: Mohammad Khatami
- Supreme Leader: Ali Khamenei
- Preceded by: Hossein Amir-Moayed
- Succeeded by: Mohammad Reza Naqdi

Commander of the IRGC Aerospace Force
- In office 18 January 1992 – 30 October 1997
- President: Akbar Hashemi Rafsanjani; Mohammad Khatami
- Supreme Leader: Ali Khamenei
- Preceded by: Hossein Dehghan
- Succeeded by: Mohammad Bagher Ghalibaf

Minister of Defence
- In office 28 October 1985 – 29 August 1989
- President: Ali Khamenei
- Prime Minister: Mir-Hossein Mousavi
- Supreme Leader: Ruhollah Khomeini
- Preceded by: Mohammad-Reza Rahimi (acting)
- Succeeded by: Akbar Torkan

Commander of the Islamic Republic of Iran Army Aviation
- In office 1983–1987
- President: Ali Khamenei
- Prime Minister: Mir-Hossein Mousavi
- Supreme Leader: Ruhollah Khomeini
- Preceded by: Mansour Shalchi
- Succeeded by: Mohammad Ansari

Personal details
- Born: 1936 (age 89–90) Pahlavi Iran
- Awards: Order of Nasr

Military service
- Allegiance: Pahlavi Iran (1958–1979); Iran (1979–2000)
- Branch/service: Artesh; IRGC
- Years of service: 1958–2000
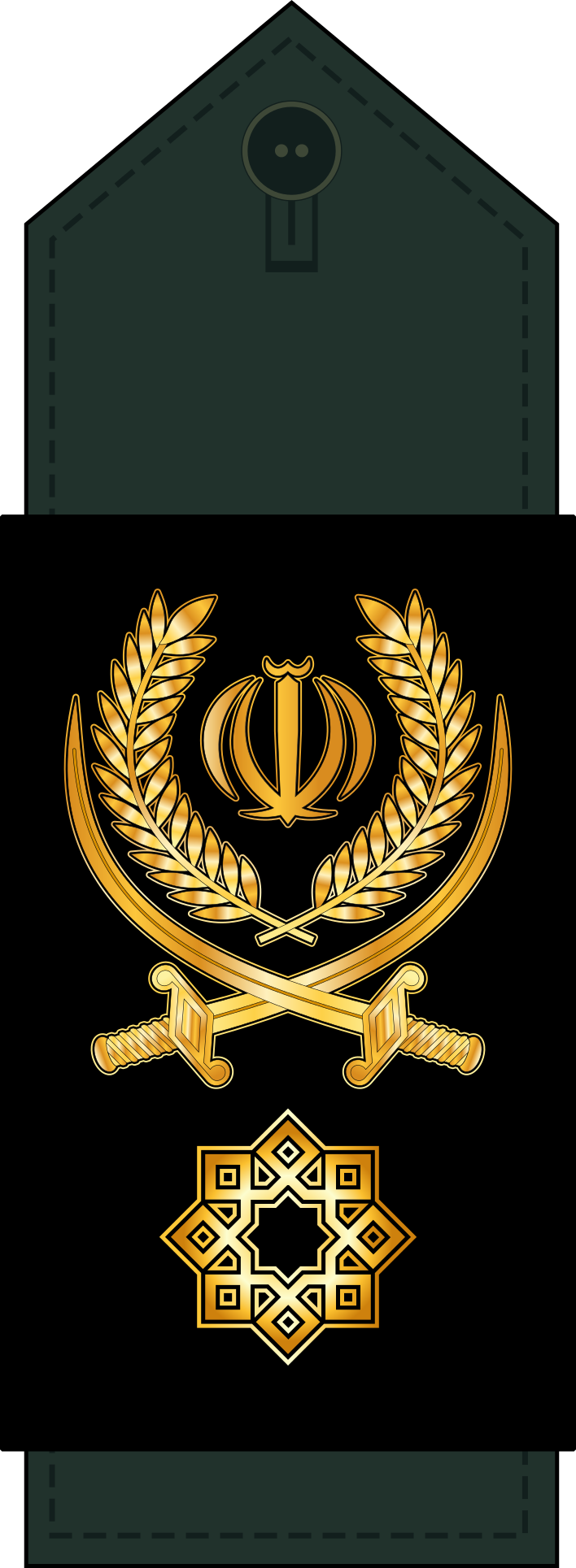
- Rank: Brigadier General
- Battles/wars: Iran–Iraq War

Mohammad Hossein Jalali (Persian: محمدحسین جلالی; 1936) is an Iranian military official who served as minister of defense.

== Career ==
Jalali was appointed minister of defense in October 1985 to the cabinet headed by Prime Minister Mir-Hossein Mousavi. He replaced Mohammad Salimi as defense minister. Jalali was in office until August 1989.

Jalali was the commander of the Air Force of the Islamic Revolutionary Guard Corps. He was appointed to this post in January 1992, replacing Hossein Dehghan. In November 1997, Mohammad Bagher Ghalibaf replaced Jalali as commander of the air wing of the IRGC. Then Jalali was appointed by Ali Khamenei as deputy chief of staff of the armed forces for logistics, research and industry.

Military offices
Preceded by Hossein Amir-Moayad	Deputy of the General Staff of the Armed Forces for Logistics and Industrial Research; 1997–2000	Succeeded by Mohammad Reza Naqdi
Preceded by Hossein Dehghan	Commander of the Islamic Revolutionary Guards Air Force; 18 January 1992 – 30 October 1997	Succeeded by Mohammad Bagher Ghalibaf
Preceded by Mansour Shalchi	Commander of the Islamic Republic of Iran Army Aviation; 1983–1987	Succeeded by Mohammad Ansari
Government offices
Preceded by Mohammad-Reza Rahimi as Acting Minister	Minister of Defence; 28 October 1985 – 29 August 1989	Succeeded by Akbar Torkan
