= Mohammad Salimi =

Iranian Army General (1937–2016)

Timsar Mohammad Salimi
- محمد سلیمی
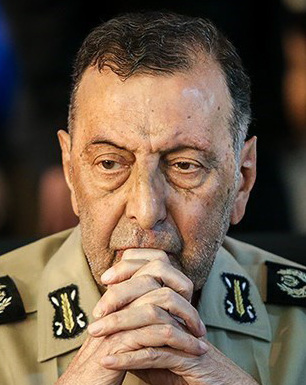

Advisor to the Commander-in-Chief of the Armed Forces on Army Affairs
- In office 11 September 2005 – 30 January 2016
- President: Mohammad Khatami; Mahmoud Ahmadinejad; Hassan Rouhani
- Supreme Leader: Ali Khamenei
- Preceded by: Office Established
- Succeeded by: Ataollah Salehi

Commander-in-chief of the Islamic Republic of Iran Army
- In office 21 May 2000 – 11 September 2005
- President: Mohammad Khatami; Mahmoud Ahmadinejad
- Prime Minister: Mir-Hossein Mousavi
- Supreme Leader: Ali Khamenei
- Preceded by: Ali Shahbazi
- Succeeded by: Ataollah Salehi

Commander of the Khatam al-Anbia Air Defense Headquarters
- In office 21 May 2000 – 11 September 2005
- President: Mohammad Khatami; Mahmoud Ahmadinejad
- Supreme Leader: Ali Khamenei
- Preceded by: ?
- Succeeded by: ?

Acting Head of the Military Advisory Group to the Commander-in-Chief of the Armed Forces
- In office 13 October 1999 – 21 May 2000
- President: Mohammad Khatami
- Supreme Leader: Ali Khamenei
- Preceded by: Qasem-Ali Zahirnejad
- Succeeded by: Ali Shahbazi

Deputy Head of the Military Advisory Group to the Commander-in-Chief of the Armed Forces
- In office 1989–2000
- President: Akbar Hashemi Rafsanjani; Mohammad Khatami
- Supreme Leader: Ali Khamenei
- Preceded by: Office Established
- Succeeded by: ?

Advisor to the Commander-in-Chief of the Armed Forces on Ground Forces Affairs
- In office 1989–2000
- President: Akbar Hashemi Rafsanjani; Mohammad Khatami
- Supreme Leader: Ali Khamenei
- Preceded by: Office Established
- Succeeded by: Nasser Arasteh

Presidential Advisor & Head of the Special Military Inspection
- In office 1984–1989
- President: Ali Khamenei
- Prime Minister: Mohammad-Reza Mahdavi Kani; Mir-Hossein Mousavi
- Supreme Leader: Ruhollah Khomeini
- Preceded by: Office Established
- Succeeded by: Vacant

Chief of the Advisory Office to the Commander-in-Chief of the Armed Forces in the Army
- In office 1980–1981
- President: Mohammad-Ali Rajai
- Prime Minister: Mohammad-Ali Rajai; Mohammad-Javad Bahonar
- Supreme Leader: Ruhollah Khomeini
- Preceded by: Ali Khamenei
- Succeeded by: ?

Secretary of the Supreme Defense Council
- In office 1980–1980
- President: Abolhassan Banisadr
- Prime Minister: Mohammad-Ali Rajai
- Supreme Leader: Ruhollah Khomeini
- Preceded by: ?
- Succeeded by: Mehdi Chamran

Minister of Defense
- In office 2 November 1981 – 14 August 1984
- President: Ali Khamenei
- Prime Minister: Mir-Hossein Mousavi
- Supreme Leader: Ruhollah Khomeini
- Preceded by: Mousa Namjoo
- Succeeded by: Mir-Hossein Mousavi (acting); Mohammad-Reza Rahimi (military officer) (acting); Mohammad Hossein Jalali

Personal details
- Born: 11 August 1937 Mashhad, Pahlavi Iran
- Died: 30 January 2016 (aged 78) Tehran, Iran
- Awards: Order of Nasr (1st class)

Military service
- Allegiance: Pahlavi Iran (1957–1979); Iran (1979–1989); (2000–2005)
- Branch/service: Ground Force
- Years of service: 1957–1989; 2000–2005
- Rank: Major general
- Battles/wars: Iran–Iraq War; War in Afghanistan (2001–2021); 2001 uprising in Herat; Insurgency in Sistan and Balochistan

Mohammad Salimi (Persian: محمد سلیمی; 11 August 1937 – 30 January 2016) was an Iranian military officer who served as Minister of Defense from November 1981 to August 1984 and as commander of the Islamic Republic of Iran Army from 2000 to 2005.

== Biography ==
Salimi was born in Mashhad in 1937. Salimi was the defense minister in the cabinet of Mir-Hossein Mousavi, replacing Javad Fakoori. He was in office from 1981 to August 1984. He was succeeded by Mohammad Hossein Jalali as defense minister.

Although Salimi retired, he was appointed commander-in-chief in May 2000, replacing Ali Shahbazi. Salimi resigned from office in September 2005. He was succeeded by Major General Ataollah Salehi as the commander-in-chief of the Iranian Army. Then Salimi was named as Ali Khamenei's military advisor on the same date.

== See also ==
- List of Iranian two-star generals since 1979

Government offices
Preceded by Mousa Namjoo	Minister of Defense; 2 November 1981–14 August 1984	Succeeded by Mir-Hossein Mousavi
Preceded by ?	Secretary of the Supreme Defense Council; 1980	Succeeded by Mehdi Chamran
Military offices
Preceded by New Office	Advisor to the Commander-in-Chief of the Armed Forces on Army Affairs; 11 September 2005–30 January 2016	Succeeded by Ataollah Salehi
Preceded by Ali Shahbazi	Commander-in-Chief of the Islamic Republic of Iran Army; 21 May 2000–11 September 2005	Succeeded by Ataollah Salehi
Preceded by Ali Khamenei	Chief of the Advisory Office to the Commander-in-Chief of the Armed Forces in the Army; 1980–1981	Succeeded by ?
Preceded by Office Established	Presidential Advisor & Head of the Special Military Inspection; 1984–1989	Succeeded by Vacant
Preceded by Office Established	Advisor to the to the Commander-in-Chief of the Armed Forces on Ground Forces Affairs; 1989–2000	Succeeded by Nasser Arasteh
Preceded by Office Established	Deputy Head of the Military Advisory Group to the Commander-in-Chief of the Armed Forces on Ground Forces Affairs; 1989–2000	Succeeded by ?
Preceded by Qasem-Ali Zahirnejad	Acting Head of the Military Advisory Group to the Commander-in-Chief of the Armed Forces on Ground Forces Affairs; 13 October 1999–21 May 2000	Succeeded by Ali Shahbazi
Preceded by ?	Commander of the Khatam al-Anbia Air Defense Headquarters; 21 May 2000 – 11 September 2005	Succeeded by ?
