= Mehrdad Akhlaghi-Ketabachi =

Iranian defence official (born 1958)

Mehrdad Akhlaghi
- مهرداد اخلاقی
- Akhlaghi in 2026

Minister of Defence and Armed Forces Logistics
- Incumbent
- Assumed office 18 October 2026
- President: Masoud Pezeshkian
- Supreme Leader: Mojtaba Khamenei
- Preceded by: Aziz Nasirzadeh; Majid Ebn-e-Reza (acting)

Head of the Defense Industries Organization
- In office 2013 – 18 October 2026
- President: Hassan Rouhani; Ebrahim Raisi; Mohammad Mokhber (acting); Masoud Pezeshkian
- Supreme Leader: Ali Khamenei; Mojtaba Khamenei
- Preceded by: Mehdi Gogerdchian
- Succeeded by: Vacant

Managing Director of the Aerospace Industries Organization
- In office 2014 – 18 October 2026
- President: Hassan Rouhani; Ebrahim Raisi; Mohammad Mokhber (acting); Masoud Pezeshkian
- Supreme Leader: Ali Khamenei; Mojtaba Khamenei
- Preceded by: Farhad Amiri
- Succeeded by: Vacant

Personal details
- Born: 10 September 1958 (age 68) Rasht, Pahlavi Iran
- Education: Malek-Ashtar University of Technology; Amirkabir University of Technology

Mehrdad Akhlaghi Ketabchi (Persian: مهرداد اخلاقی کتابچی; born 10 September 1958) is an Iranian defence official who has served as Minister of Defence and Armed Forces Logistics since October 2026.

A veteran in the Iranian missile program, he previously headed the Shahid Bagheri Industrial Group, the Aerospace Industries Organization, and the Defence Industries Organization, all involved in Iranian defense manufacturing. He was also close with Hassan Tehrani Moghaddam, and played a role in developing many of Iran's ballistic missiles, including the Fateh-110. For his role in the Iranian missile program, he has been sanctioned internationally, including by the United Nations and the United States.

== Early life and education ==
Akhlaghi was born in Rasht on 10 September 1958. He earned a master's degree in strategic managing at the Malek-Ashtar University of Technology, and a bachelor's degree chemical engineering at the Amirkabir University of Technology.

== Defence career ==
He joined the defence industry 1984, four years into the Iran–Iraq War. He specialized in ballistic missiles, solid-fuel propulsion, and military manufacturing. During his career, he grew close ties to Hassan Tehrani Moghaddam, the founder of the Islamic Revolutionary Guard Corps' missile program, and reportedly approved the purchasing of equipment and facilities for the Fateh-110, amounting to $10 million. According to Iranian Kurdish opposition sources, Akhlaghi helped build Hezbollah's missile arsenal alongside Moghaddam in Lebanon in the 1980s, and after Moghaddam's death in 2011, managed the creation of missile and drone units for Iran-backed Iraqi militias and the Houthis in Yemen. He also helped develop infrastructure for the Imam Khomeini Space Center in Semnan, including space launchers and research rockets, and improved the Sejjil and Zolfaghar missile families, alongside the Almas and the Yasin guided bomb.

By 2007, Akhlaghi was head of the Shahid Bagheri Industrial Group, a ballistic missiles program linked to the Ministry of Defence. On 12 November 2014, he was appointed head of the Aerospace Industries Organization by defence minister Hossein Dehghan. In 2020, he was identified by the United States as director of the Defence Industries Organization, having headed it since 2013.

== Minister of Defence ==
Akhlaghi was nominated as defence minister by president Masoud Pezeshkian on 5 October 2026. The post had been held by acting minister Majid Ebn-e-Reza after the previous defence minister, Aziz Nasirzadeh, was killed by US-Israeli airstrikes on 28 February. On 18 October 2026, the Islamic Consultative Assembly (Majlis) confirmed Akhlaghi as Iran's Minister of Defence and Armed Forces Logistics. Following a debate during a plenary session, Akhlaghi secured a vote of confidence with 237 votes in favor, 15 against, and zero abstentions out of 277 total ballots cast. Another 25 of those present were unable to vote due to a lack of internet access, while eight were absent. Ebn-e-Reza was appointed his deputy.

Akhlaghi presented a 16-point plan to parliament that included reconstructing the nation's military infrastructure, which had been damaged during the war, hastening defence manufacturing, and strengthening cooperation with private-sector corporations. On the day of his appointment, he issued a threat to the United States vowing to inflict "enormous damage" on its interests and its allies if they attacked Iran.

== Sanctions ==
Akhlaghi was sanctioned by the United Nations in 2007 under Resolution 1737. The following year, he was sanctioned by the United States Department of the Treasury for his links to the Iranian missile program; he was sanctioned again under the first Trump administration in 2020. He is also sanctioned by the European Union and the United Kingdom.

Political offices
Preceded by Aziz Nasirzadeh	Minister of Defence and Armed Forces Logistics; 18 October 2026–present	Incumbent
