= Majid Ibn Reza =

Iranian military officer and politician

Sardar Seyyed Majid Ibn Reza
- سید مجید ابن‌الرضا
- Ibn Reza in 2026

Minister of Defence and Armed Forces Logistics Acting
- In office 2 March 2026 – 18 October 2026
- President: Masoud Pezeshkian
- Supreme Leader: Mojtaba Khamenei (Note: Between Ali Khamenei's death on 28 February and Mojtaba Khamenei's election on 8 March, an interim leadership council composed of Pezeshkian, Chief Justice Gholam-Hossein Mohseni-Eje'i, and Alireza Arafi was tasked with handing the duties of the supreme leader.)
- Preceded by: Aziz Nasirzadeh
- Succeeded by: Mehrdad Akhlaghi-Ketabachi

Deputy Minister of Defence and Armed Forces Logistics
- Incumbent
- Assumed office 26 July 2025
- President: Masoud Pezeshkian
- Supreme Leader: Ali Khamenei; Mojtaba Khamenei
- Preceded by: Seyyed Hojatollah Qureishi

Deputy Minister of Defence and Armed Forces Logistics, Head of the Armed Forces Social Security Organization
- In office 2022 – 26 July 2025
- President: Ebrahim Raisi; Mohammad Mokhber (acting); Masoud Pezeshkian
- Supreme Leader: Ali Khamenei
- Preceded by: Farshad Najafipour
- Succeeded by: Saeed Sadeghi Goghari

Deputy Minister of Defence and Armed Forces Logistics for Human Resources
- In office 2017–2022
- President: Hassan Rouhani; Ebrahim Raisi
- Supreme Leader: Ali Khamenei
- Preceded by: Morteza Makhmalbaf
- Succeeded by: Saeed Sadeghi Goghari

Personal details
- Born: 1964 (age 61–62) Pahlavi Iran

Military service
- Allegiance: Iran
- Branch/service: IRGC
- Years of service: 1980s–present
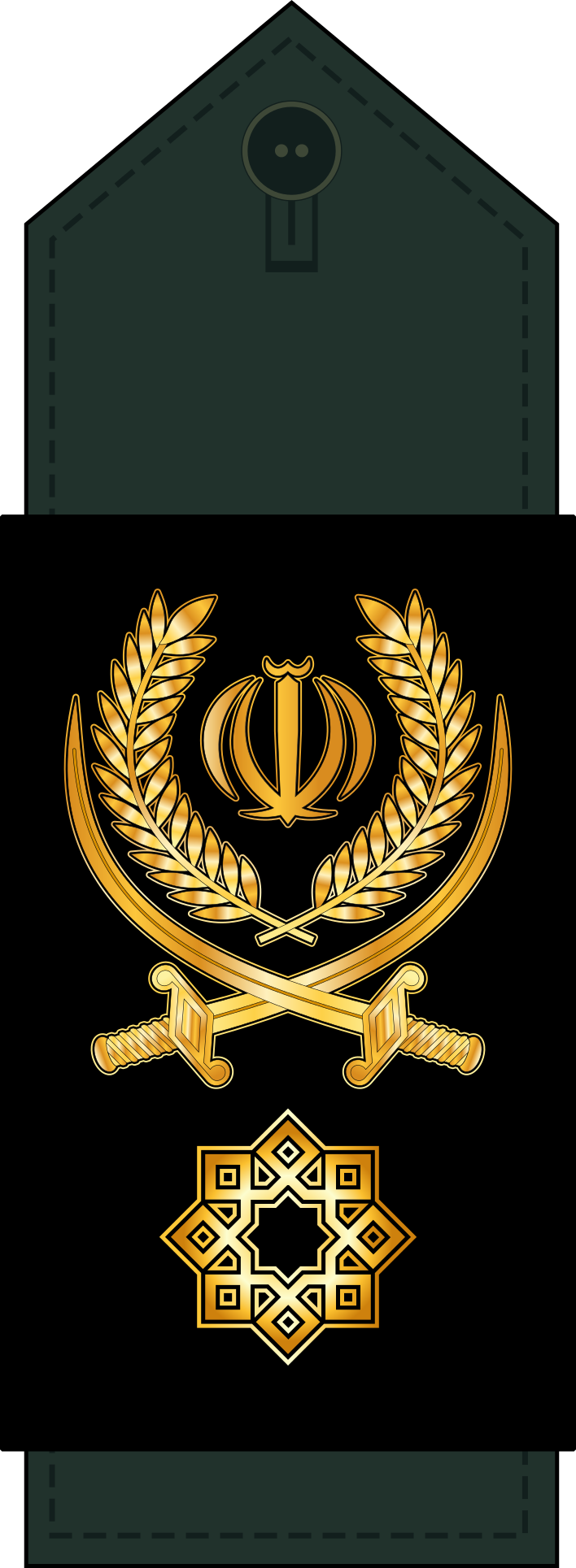
- Rank: Brigadier General
- Battles/wars: Iran–Iraq War; 2024 Iran–Israel conflict; Twelve-Day War; 2026 Iran war

Majid Ibn Reza (Persian: مجید ابن‌الرضا; born 1964) (Note: Claimed as dead; not confirmed by Iran or Israel) is an Iranian military officer and politician who served as the acting minister of defense of Iran from March to October 2026.

According to the Deputy for Communications and Information of the Iranian President's Office, President Masoud Pezeshkian appointed Ebn-e-Reza as the acting Minister of Defense of the Islamic Republic of Iran. Prior to his appointment, he held several strategic positions in the Ministry of Defense, the General Staff of the Armed Forces, and the defense industries, and most recently served as a deputy minister in the ministry.

== Alleged assassination ==
On March 3, 2026, reports circulated claiming Israel had killed him in an airstrike, two days after the death of his predecessor, Aziz Nasirzadeh. However, neither Iran nor Israel has confirmed his death.
