= Esmaeil Sohrabi =

Iranian Military Officer

Timsar Esmaeil Sohrabi
- اسماعیل سهرابی
- General Sohrabi, c. 1960s
- Born: 23 January 1938 (age 88); Kermanshah, Pahlavi Iran
- Military career
- Allegiance: Pahlavi Iran (1959–1979); Iran (1979–1988)
- Branch: Imperial Iranian Army; Islamic Republic of Iran Ground Forces
- Service years: 1959–1988
- Rank: Brigadier General
- Unit: Airborne Infantry
- Commands: Chief of the Joint Staff (1984–1988); Shiraz Infantry Training Center (1983–1984); Fars Operational Headquarters (1983–1984); 81st Armored Division of Kermanshah (1981–1983); 2nd Brigade of Saqqez (1980–1981); 1st Brigade of Islamabad (1979–1980)
- Conflicts: 1979 Kurdish rebellion Iran–Iraq War

Esmaeil Sohrabi (Persian: اسماعیل سهرابی) is an Iranian retired military officer who served as the Chief-of-Staff of the Islamic Republic of Iran Army from 25 October 1984 until 3 May 1988.

He was an infantry staff colonel when appointed by Ayatollah Khomeini to the office.

== Biography ==
Esmaeil Sohrabi was born on January 23, 1938, in Kermanshah. In June 1959, after receiving his high school diploma in mathematics, he entered the Officers' Academy. He began his active service in the Imperial Iranian Army in 1963 with the rank of Second Lieutenant.

After completing his advanced course in September 1975, he served in the 28th Infantry Division of Kurdistan as a Planning and Organization Officer, as well as an Training and Operations Officer for the 3rd Bureau (G-3) of the division. Concurrently, he served as the division's security officer, rising to the rank of Major. In 1976, he was interrogated and placed under surveillance by the Imperial Army's Counterintelligence and subsequently by SAVAK.

Following the 1979 Islamic Revolution, he was introduced to Major General Mohammad-Vali Gharani. In March 1979, he was appointed as the acting head of the 2nd Brigade of Saqqez, a unit under the 28th Division of Kurdistan. In April 1979, he was transferred to the Army Ground Forces' Western Regional Headquarters. By September 1979, holding the rank of Major, he was appointed commander of the 2nd Brigade of Saqqez for a second time. In February 1980, he was promoted to Lieutenant Colonel and took command of the 1st Brigade of Islamabad, part of the 81st Armored Division of Kermanshah.

Sohrabi was promoted to the rank of full Colonel in February 1981. By November 1981, he was appointed Commander of the 81st Armored Division of Kermanshah, leading this division during Operation Matla-ol-Fajr. In mid-March 1983, he assumed command of the Fars Operational Headquarters while concurrently directing the Shiraz Infantry Training Center. During the Iran–Iraq War, he served as the Chief of the Joint Staff of the Army from October 25, 1984, to May 3, 1988. He was succeeded by Brigadier General Ali Shahbazi.

== Education ==
- 1960–1963: Entered the Military Officers' Academy, graduating with a Bachelor's degree and the rank of Second Lieutenant.
- 1964: Completed specialized officers' training courses.
- 1974–1975: Completed the Advanced Infantry Course at the Shiraz Infantry Training Center.
- 1978: Graduated from the Command and General Staff College (DAFOS).
- Higher Education: Holds a Master’s degree in Public Administration from the Faculty of Management, University of Tehran, and a Doctorate (PhD) in Political Relations and International Affairs from the Higher Education Center of the Ministry of Culture and Higher Education.

Military offices
Preceded by Qasem-Ali Zahirnejad	Chief of the Joint Staff of the Islamic Republic of Iran Army; 1984–1988	Succeeded by Ali Shahbazi
