= Hassan Shahsafi =

Iranian Air Force commander

Amir Hassan Shahsafi
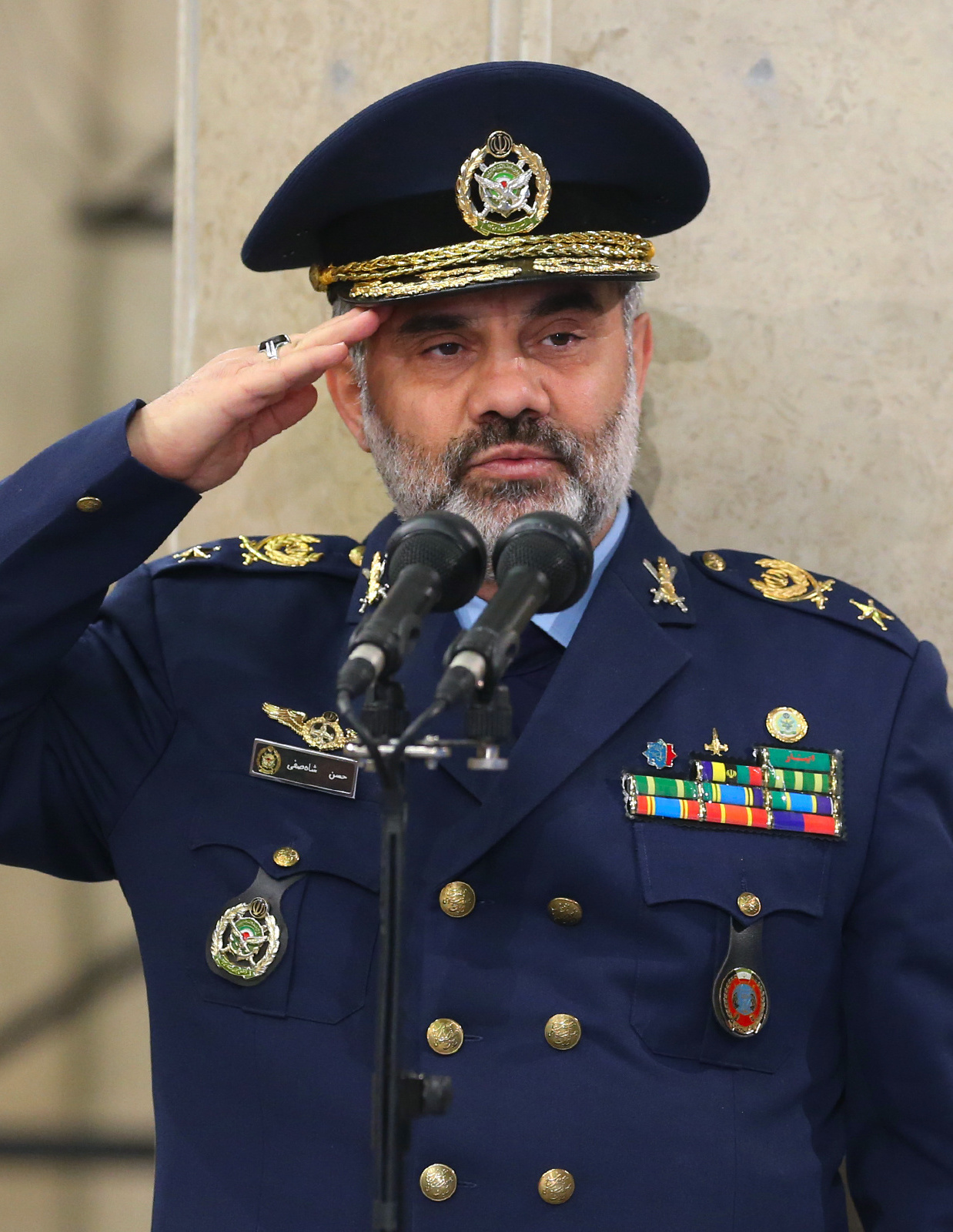
- Shahsafi in 2017
- Born: 7 October 1964; Damavand, Tehran province, Pahlavi Iran
- Military career
- Allegiance: Iran
- Branch: Air Force
- Service years: 1982–present
- Rank: Brigadier General
- Commands: Deputy to the Deputy Coordinator of the Islamic Republic of Iran Army (2018–2025); Iranian Air Force (2008–2018); Deputy Commander of the Iranian Air Force (2006–2008); 4th Tactical Air Base (Dezful) (2005–2006)
- Conflicts: Iran–Iraq War; Syrian civil war; Iranian intervention in Syria; War in Iraq (2013–2017); Iranian intervention in Iraq; Iran–PJAK conflict; Western Iran clashes

Hassan Shahsafi (Persian: حسن شاه‌صفی) was the commander of the Iranian Air Force from August 2008 to August 2018. He used to fly Northrop F-5 and was based in Dezful Air Base before he was appointed as the IRIAF Commander.

== Biography ==
Hassan Shahsafi was born in 1964 in Damavand. After completing his secondary education, he enlisted in the Islamic Republic of Iran Air Force in 1982. Following completion of the required training and graduation from the Air Force Flight Academy, he was commissioned as a Second Lieutenant and began his military career in the IRIAF.

He subsequently served as an F-5 Tiger II fighter pilot at various Air Force bases and participated in several close air support operations during the final years of the Iran–Iraq War.

In 1996, Shahsafi completed the Advanced Branch Officer Course, and in 1999 graduated from the Command and Staff College (DAFOOS) of the Islamic Republic of Iran Army.

== Military career ==
Shahsafi has held the following positions:

- Chief of Tactical Operations, Deputy for Operations, Islamic Republic of Iran Air Force
- Deputy Director of Operations, Deputy for Operations, Islamic Republic of Iran Air Force
- Deputy Commander, 4th Tactical Air Base (Dezful)
- Commander, 4th Tactical Air Base (Dezful)
- Deputy Commander, Islamic Republic of Iran Air Force
- Commander, Islamic Republic of Iran Air Force
- Deputy Chief of the Army Joint Staff

On the recommendation of the Commander-in-Chief of the Army, Shahsafi was appointed Commander of the Islamic Republic of Iran Air Force by Ali Khamenei on 31 August 2008. He remained in office until 19 August 2018, when he was succeeded by Aziz Nasirzadeh. His ten-year tenure made him the longest-serving Commander of the Islamic Republic of Iran Air Force since the 1979 Iranian Revolution.

== Deputy Chief of the Army Joint Staff ==
In September 2018, Shahsafi was appointed Deputy to the Deputy Coordinator of the Islamic Republic of Iran Army, a position equivalent to Deputy Chief of the Army Joint Staff. He serves under Habibollah Sayyari, who is the Deputy Coordinator of the Islamic Republic of Iran Army and former Commander of the Iranian Navy.

Military offices
Preceded by Ahmad Meyghani	Commander of the Islamic Republic of Iran Army Air Force; 31 August 2008–19 August 2018	Succeeded by Aziz Nasirzadeh
