= Military budget of Iran =

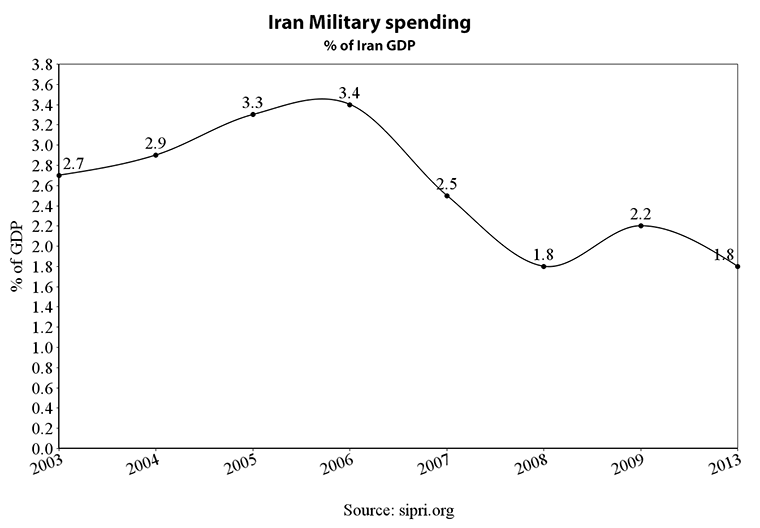

Share of service branches in defence budget of 2020–21, based on calculations by Henry Rome
1. IRGC (34.0%)
2. Regular military (13.0%)
3. Police (19.0%)
4. Defence ministry (7.00%)
5. Social Security (27.0%)

The military budget of Iran is the portion of the country's overall budget that is allocated for the funding of the Iranian Armed Forces and the Ministry of Defense and Armed Forces Logistics.

== Contributing factors ==
Research shows that oil revenue has been a major economic factor on military spending of Iran and in the 1970s led to "petrodollar recycling".

A study investigating the impact of sanctions against Iran on the country's military spending, examining historical record between from 1960 to 2017 and using auto-regressive distributed lag model (ARDL), found that unilateral sanctions by the United States would have insignificant effect on Iran's expenditure while multilateral sanctions (imposed by the United Nations and the European Union in addition to the U.S.) would be statistically significant.

== Estimates ==
=== Sources ===
There are multiple sources estimating the military expenditure of Iran, however differences exist between the numbers. An example is a dispute among U.S. government agencies; while the Arms Control and Disarmament Agency (ACDA) estimated Iranian 1993 expenditure to be $4.9 billion, U.S. intelligence experts believed Iran had spent up to $8 billion that year. In 1995, the Central Intelligence Agency (CIA) concluded that it was unable to make accurate numbers using conversion of Iranian official reports in rial to U.S. dollar, the number in 1993 was 2,507 billion rials. Other sources estimating military budget of Iran include the International Institute for Strategic Studies (IISS) and the Stockholm International Peace Research Institute (SIPRI). Iranian The International Monetary Fund (IMF) also produces its own figures.

=== Under the Shah (until 1979) ===
According to data compiled by Shahram Chubin and Sepehr Zabih, the estimated military expenditure of Iran from 1960 to 1972, in constant price of 1960 and with exchange rate of the same year, would be calculated as the following:

Year	Estimated Spending (mil$. )			% of GDP		
Year	IISS	SIPRI	ACDA	IISS	SIPRI	ACDA
1960		166	182.9			
1961	147.6		181			4.4
1962	125	186	180.1			4.1
1963	170	191	183			3.9
1964	195	233	201.2	4.1		4.6
1965	217	227	250.11	3.8		3.8
1966	255	322	285	3.9		5.0
1967	480	440	366.3	4.9		5.9
1968	495	553	465.7	5.6		6.9
1969	594	648	536.9	5.0		7.1
1970	779	833	619.5	7.1		8.2
1971	1,023		686.7	8.5		
1972	1,915					

Morteza Gharehbaghian has compiled the following table based on Statistical Centre of Iran's consensus and various issues of SIPRI:

Year	Spending (mil$. )	Population (mil.)	Per capita	% of GDP
1950	212	15.8	13.4	
1955	▲291	▲18.7	▲15.6	
1960	▲577	▲21.3	▲27.1	4.3
1965	▲862	▲24.8	▲34.6	▲4.9
1970	▲1,906	▲29.2	▲65.3	▲6.6
1975	▲10,168	▲33.3	▲304.4	▲13.1
1976	▲11,031	▲33.7	▲327.3	▼12.5
1977	▼8,902	▲34.3	▼230.4	▼10.8
1978	▲9,500	▲35.1	▲270.6	▲13.0

=== SIPRI annual estimates since 1960 ===
Source: SIPRI Military Expenditure Database

Year	Current amount ($ mil.)	Constant 2019 amount ($ mil.)	% of GDP	% of Gov Budget
1960	98.7	692	2.3%	
1961	105.9	720	2.3%	
1962	109.9	741	2.3%	
1963	128.7	865	2.6%	
1964	155.4	1006	2.9%	
1965	200.0	1268	3.2%	
1966	256.1	1629	3.8%	
1967	331.0	2073	4.5%	
1968	437.3	2720	5.2%	
1969	566.0	3398	6.0%	
1970	620.1	3662	5.9%	
1971	402.3	2280	3.0%	
1972	371.9	1981	2.3%	
1973	480.9	2121	1.9%	
1974	3877.9	14702	8.8%	
1975	5951.0	19991	12.1%	
1976	7186.3	22527	11.2%	
1977	7617.2	18865	10.2%	
1978	8113.7	17950	11.1%	
1979	4993.8	9999	5.8%	
1980	4874.9	8107	5.3%	
1981	8121.6	12062	8.2%	
1982	9703.5	12960	7.9%	
1983	10550.4	12155	7.1%	
1984	9926.3	10594	6.4%	
1985	10706.4	11070	6.5%	
1986	11741.4	8868	6.1%	
1987	15263.4	8135	5.9%	
1988	18889.0	7520	6.3%	
1989	16301.8	5562	4.6%	
1990	16474.4	4938	2.2%	14.5%
1991	17549.6	4452	2.9%	12.5%
1992	19732.6	3864	1.8%	9.9%
1993	1448.2	4525	1.7%	5.1%
1994	1703.2	5584	2.1%	7.6%
1995	2501.5	5478	2.2%	8.5%
1996	3551.0	6041	2.2%	10.6%
1997	4642.4	6738	2.5%	11.9%
1998	5479.4	6743	2.6%	12.9%
1999	6650.3	6821	2.4%	12.6%
2000	8327.1	7509	2.3%	14.0%
2001	10378.8	8359	2.4%	14.5%
2002	3243.9	8998	2.2%	10.9%
2003	3717.1	10502	2.4%	12.1%
2004	5243.6	13571	2.8%	15.2%
2005	6796.7	16138	3.0%	14.1%
2006	8751.5	19323	3.3%	14.2%
2007	9330.9	17769	2.7%	14.0%
2008	11082.0	17095	2.7%	12.6%
2009	12584.6	17886	3.0%	15.3%
2010	13561.3	18200	2.8%	15.2%
2011	14277.7	15708	2.4%	13.0%
2012	16494.0	16354	2.8%	19.3%
2013	11997.2	13170	2.2%	15.6%
2014	9901.1	13131	2.3%	14.8%
2015	10588.8	13962	2.8%	15.4%
2016	12264.0	16028	3.0%	15.2%
2017	13931.2	18034	3.1%	16.0%
2018	11230.9	15257	2.5%	13.9%
2019	12528.5	12528	2.1%	12.6%
2020	15825.1	12151	2.2%	11.7%
2021	24600			17.32%

== See also ==
- Iran’s public budget
- List of countries by military expenditures
- Past military expenditure by country
- List of countries by military expenditure per capita
