= Mohammad-Reza Rahimi (military officer) =

Iranian military officer (1936–2021)

Timsar Mohammad-Reza Rahimi
- محمدرضا رحيمی

Acting Minister of Defense
- In office 21 October 1984 – 28 October 1985
- President: Ali Khamenei
- Prime Minister: Mir-Hossein Mousavi
- Supreme Leader: Ruhollah Khomeini
- Preceded by: Mohammad Salimi; Mir-Hossein Mousavi (acting)
- Succeeded by: Mohammad Hossein Jalali

Deputy Minister of Defense
- In office 1981–1990
- President: Mohammad-Ali Rajai; Temporary Presidential Council; Ali Khamenei; Akbar Hashemi Rafsanjani
- Prime Minister: Mir-Hossein Mousavi
- Supreme Leader: Ruhollah Khomeini; Ali Khamenei
- Preceded by: ?
- Succeeded by: Mahmoud Pakravan

Personal details
- Born: 1936 Pahlavi Iran
- Died: 3 August 2021 (aged 84–85) Iran
- Awards: Order of Nasr

Military service
- Allegiance: Pahlavi Iran (1950s–1979); Iran (1979–1990)
- Branch/service: Ground Force
- Years of service: 1950s–1990
- Rank: Brigadier General
- Battles/wars: Iran–Iraq War

Mohammad-Reza Rahimi (Persian: محمدرضا رحيمی; 1936 – August 3, 2021) was an Iranian military officer who served as the acting Minister of Defense from 21 October 1984 to 28 October 1985, having also held office of Deputy Minister of Defense from 1981 to 1990, He was a Colonel at the time appointed to the office. Rahimi retired in January 1990 and became an advisor to the then-Minister of Defense, Akbar Torkan, Rahimi then served as one of the advisors to the Commander-in-Chief of the Armed Forces until the 2000s
