= Islamic Republic of Iran Mine Action Center =

Islamic Republic of Iran Mine Action Center (Persian: مرکز مین زدایی جمهوری اسلامی ایران) was formed by Ministry of Defense and Armed Forces Logistics in 2003 for mine clearance.

== See also ==
- Iran–Iraq War
