= Mir-Hossein Mousavi =

Prime Minister of Iran from 1981 to 1989

- میرحسین موسوی
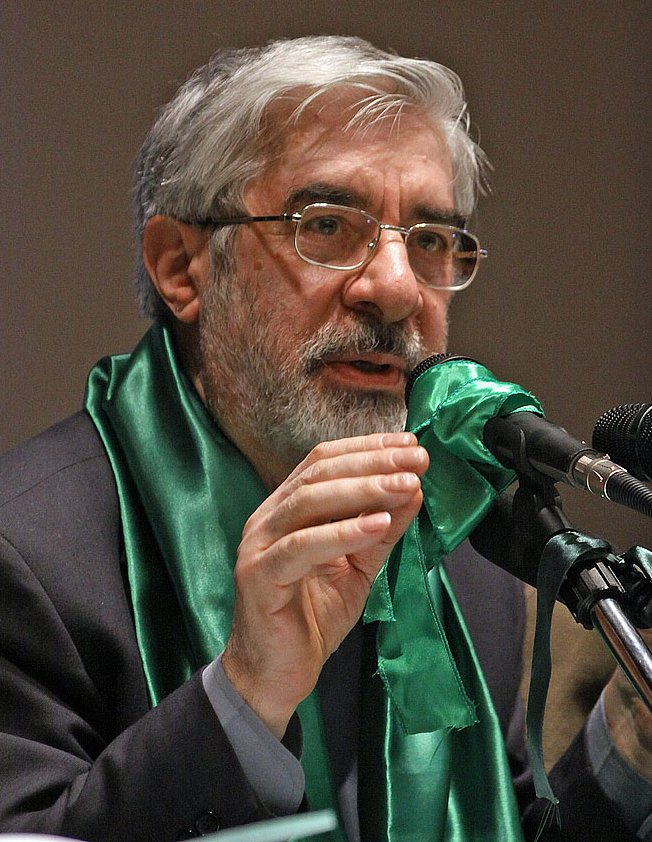
- Mousavi in 2009

Prime Minister of Iran
- In office 29 October 1981 – 16 August 1989
- President: Ali Khamenei
- Supreme Leader: Ruhollah Khomeini; Ali Khamenei
- Preceded by: Mohammad-Reza Mahdavi Kani
- Succeeded by: Office abolished (Note: The post of prime minister was abolished as a result of the 1989 revision of the constitution.)

Minister of Foreign Affairs
- In office 5 July 1981 – 15 December 1981
- Prime Minister: Mohammad-Ali Rajai; Mohammad-Javad Bahonar; Reza Mahdavi Kani (acting); Himself
- Preceded by: Mohammad-Ali Rajai (acting)
- Succeeded by: Ali Akbar Velayati

Head of Mostazafan Foundation
- In office 4 December 1981 – 6 September 1989
- Appointed by: Ruhollah Khomeini
- Preceded by: Mohammad-Ali Rajai
- Succeeded by: Mohsen Rafighdoost

Senior Advisor to the President of Iran
- In office 12 October 1997 – 3 August 2005
- President: Mohammad Khatami
- Succeeded by: Mojtaba Samareh Hashemi
Acting ministerial offices
Chief of the Headquarters of the General Command of Forces
In office 20 August 1988 – 26 September 1989
Preceded by	Akbar Hashemi Rafsanjani
Succeeded by	Hassan Firouzabadi
Minister of Defense Acting
In office 20 August 1984 – 21 October 1984
Prime Minister	Himself
Preceded by	Mohammad Salimi
Succeeded by	Mohammad-Reza Rahimi (acting)
Minister of Mines and Metals Acting
In office 28 August 1983 – 7 December 1983
Prime Minister	Himself
Preceded by	Hossein Mousaviani
Succeeded by	Hossein Nili
Minister of Agriculture Acting
In office 28 August 1983 – 7 December 1983
Prime Minister	Himself
Preceded by	Mohammad Salamati
Succeeded by	Abbas-Ali Zali
Minister of Culture and Islamic Guidance Acting
In office 26 July 1982 – 9 November 1982
Prime Minister	Himself
Preceded by	Majid Moaedikhah
Succeeded by	Mohammad Khatami
Minister of Education Acting
In office 20 August 1984 – 21 October 1984
Prime Minister	Himself
Preceded by	Ali Akbar Parvaresh
Succeeded by	Kazem Akrami
Minister of House and Urban Development Acting
In office 28 August 1983 – 15 August 1984
Prime Minister	Himself
Preceded by	Mohammad Shahab Gonabadi
Succeeded by	Serajeddin Kazerouni

Personal details
- Born: Mir-Hossein Mousavi Khameneh; 2 March 1942 (age 84) Khameneh, Imperial State of Iran
- Party: The Green Path of Hope (2009–present)
- Other political affiliations: Islamic Republican Party (1979–1987); Movement of Militant Muslims (1977–1979)
- Spouse: Zahra Rahnavard (m. 1969)
- Children: 3
- Relatives: Hossein Sharifzadegan (brother-in-law)
- Education: National University of Tehran
- Occupation: Architect, educator
- Awards: Excellent Order of Independence
- Website: kaleme.org

Military service
- Allegiance: Iran
- Branch/service: Iranian Armed Forces
- Years of service: 1988–1989

Mir-Hossein Mousavi Khameneh (Note: Persian: میرحسین موسوی خامنه, pronounced [miːɾhoˈsejne muːsæˈviːje xɒːmeˈne].) (born 2 March 1942) is an Iranian politician, artist, architect, and opposition figure who served as the last prime minister of Iran from 1981 to 1989. He was a reformist candidate for the 2009 presidential election and eventually the leader of the opposition in the post-election unrest. Mousavi served as the president of the Iranian Academy of Arts until 2009, when Iranian authorities removed him. Although Mousavi had always considered himself a reformist and believed in promoting change within the 1979 constitution, on 3 February 2023, in the Mahsa Amini protests, he announced his opposition to the Islamic Republic and asked for a widespread referendum to fully change the constitution and make a fundamental change in Iran's political system.

In the early years of the revolution, Mousavi was the editor-in-chief of Jomhouri-e Eslami, the official newspaper of the Islamic Republican Party, before being elevated to Minister of Foreign Affairs and eventually the post of Prime Minister. He was the last Prime Minister of Iran prior to the elimination of that position in the 1989 constitutional changes; he then went into semi-retirement for the next 20 years. Mousavi was removed from the Expediency Discernment Council when Khamenei renewed its membership without him. and he was omitted from the Supreme Council of Cultural Revolution in June 2011, after being a member since 1996.

For the 2009 Iranian presidential election, Mousavi came out of semi-retirement and ran as one of two Reformist candidates against the administration of then Iranian President, Mahmoud Ahmadinejad. According to official results, he did not win the election, and following alleged vote-rigging and manipulation, his campaign sparked a long protest that eventually turned into a national and international movement against the government and Supreme Leader. Despite the crackdown, he remains the leader of the Green Movement but has been severely restricted by Iranian authorities. He is currently under house arrest along with his wife Zahra Rahnavard.

== Early life, education, and career ==
Seyyed Mir-Hossein Mousavi was born on 2 March 1942 in Khameneh, East Azerbaijan, Iran. He is an ethnic Azerbaijani, whose family originated from Tabriz. His father, Mir-Ismail, was a tea merchant from Tabriz. Mousavi grew up in Khameneh, and moved to Tehran following his graduation from high school in 1958. Mousavi was a relative of Ali Khamenei, who was also a native of Khameneh. Mousavi's grandmother was Khamenei's paternal aunt.

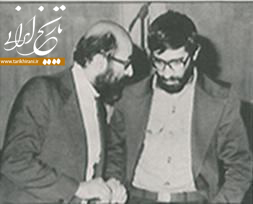
Mousavi with Mostafa Chamran, 1970s

He earned his undergraduate degree in architecture from the National University of Tehran (now Shahid Beheshti University), and in 1969 was awarded his master's degree in architecture from the National University of Tehran, focusing primarily on traditional Iranian architecture. While a student, he was an active member of the leftist Islamic association of students. During his college years, Mousavi had a close relationship with the Freedom Movement of Iran, a religious-nationalist political party founded by Ali Shariati, whom Mousavi admired for many years. Although the party would not be invited to the post-revolution government, many future political leaders of Iran who were affiliated with the party at the time, among them Mehdi Bazargan, Yadolah Sahabi, Mahmoud Taleghani, and Mostafa Chamran would become Mousavi's closest allies. Mousavi was among the student activists who regularly attended Ali Shariati's lectures at Hosseiniyeh Ershad of Tehran, where Mousavi also exhibited his artwork under the pseudonym Hossein Rah'jo.

In 1969, Mousavi married Zahra Rahnavard, a fellow university student who specialized in sculpture, and was among the well-known students of Ali Shariati. Rahnavard later became the Chancellor of Alzahra University as well as political adviser to Iran's former President Mohammad Khatami. The couple have three daughters; all speak Azeri, Persian, English, and Arabic.

== Iranian Revolution (1979–1981) ==
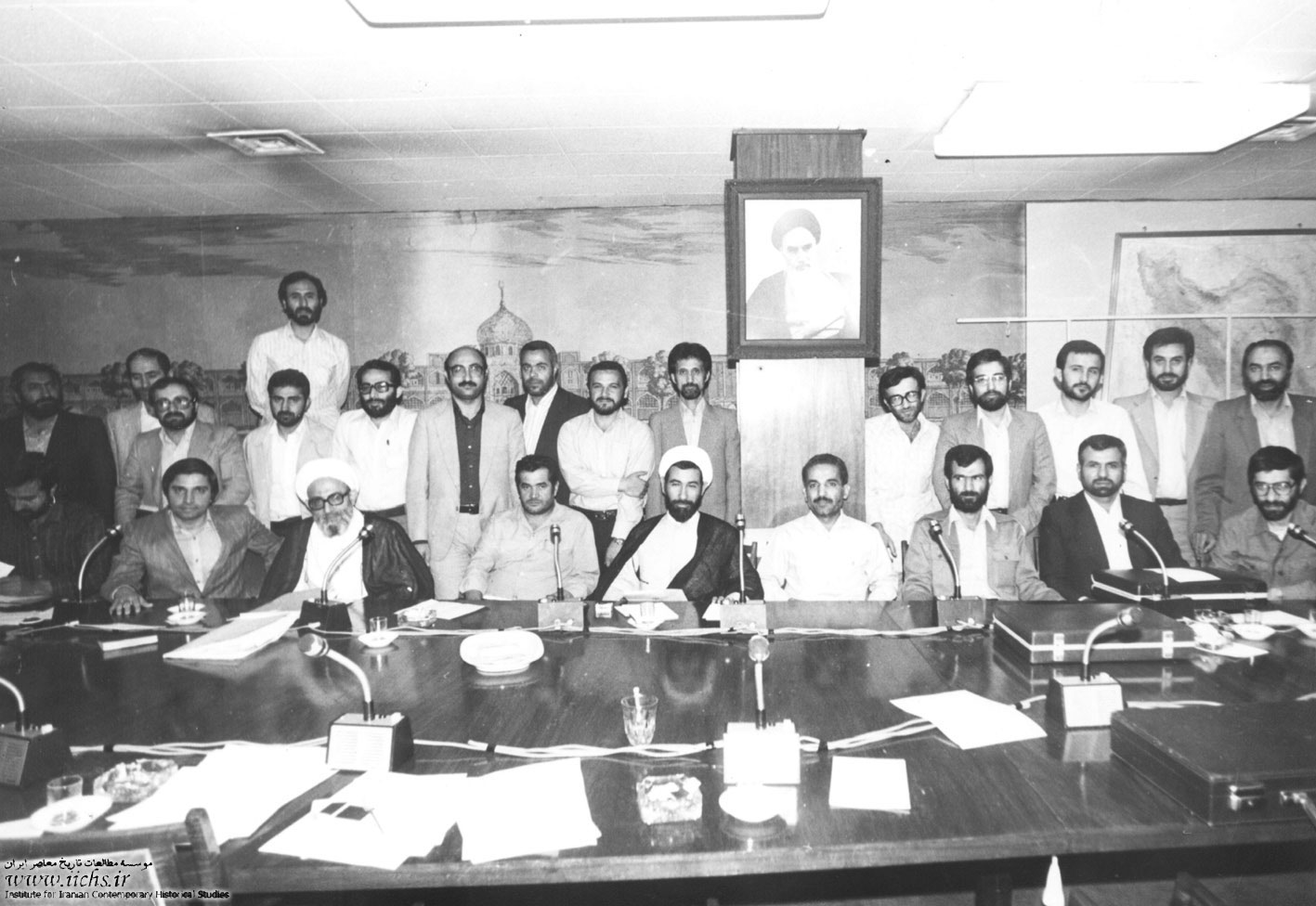
Mousavi (first from right, sitting) as Minister of Foreign Affairs in the cabinet of President Mohammad-Ali Rajai and Prime Minister Mohammad Javad Bahonar, 1981

Mousavi and his wife had an active role in the success of the Iranian Revolution. He was imprisoned for organizing street protests against the monarchy of Shah Mohammad Reza Pahlavi. As the Iranian Revolution neared, Mousavi, whose earliest political hero was Che Guevara, became more actively involved in the struggle. He initially participated in the establishment of the Jonbesh-e Mosalmanan-e Mobarez (Movement of Militant Muslims) alongside Habibollah Peyman which eventually led him to join ranks with Mohammad Beheshti, who was a close associate of the revolution leader, Ruhollah Khomeini, and abandoned his previous connections with Ali Shariati.

Following the collapse of the Shah's regime in 1979, Mousavi helped Mohammad Beheshti found the Islamic Republican Party in 1979 in order to assist the establishment of the Islamic republic in Iran and hasten the overthrow of Iran's monarchy. He became the political secretary of the party, and chief editor of Jomhouri-e Eslami, the party's official newspaper. For this, he is widely viewed as "The Architect" of the Islamic Republic both in Iran and abroad.

In mid-1979, he was appointed by Khomeini to the Council of the Islamic Revolution. As the chief editor of Jomhouri-e Eslami, he was a loud critic and opponent of Abolhassan Banisadr, the first president of the Islamic Republic, until the latter's 1981 flight to France, following a successful impeachment by parliament. During Banisadr's presidency, the prime minister Mohammad Ali Rajai nominated Mousavi as his foreign minister, however Banisadr opposed the nomination and Mousavi was not appointed. On 15 August 1981, as part of the restructuring of the government in Rajai's cabinet, Mousavi was appointed foreign minister. He held the post until 15 December 1981, when he received the higher appointment of prime minister.

== Prime Minister of Iran (1981–1989) ==
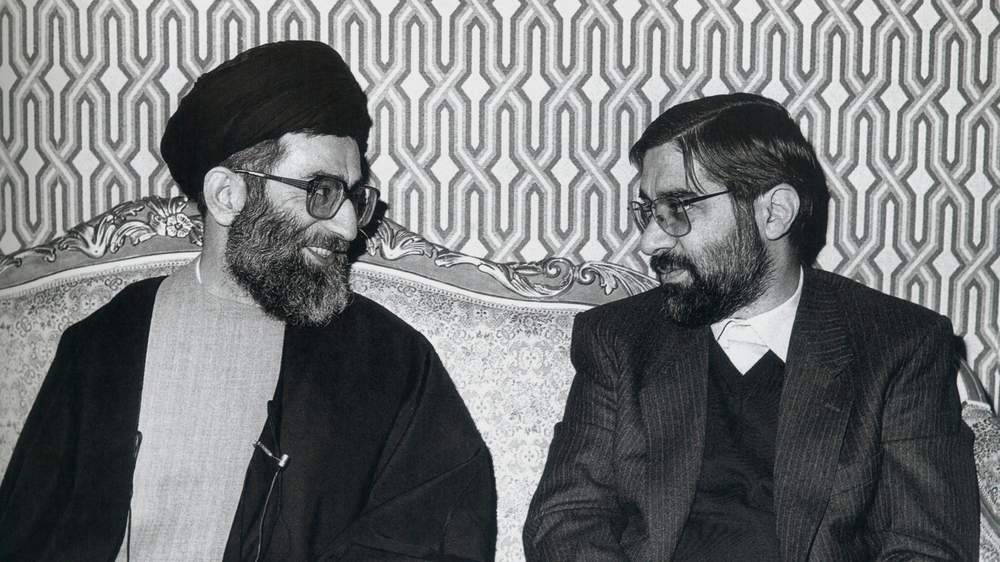
Mousavi (right) with then-President Ali Khamenei (left)

In August 1981, President Mohammad-Ali Rajai and Prime Minister Mohammad-Javad Bahonar were assassinated in an explosion. Ali Khamenei was then elected as the third President of Iran in the October 1981 Iranian presidential election. He put forward Ali Akbar Velayati as his prime minister, but the Iranian parliament did not give him the vote of confidence, and he was defeated with a vote of 80 to 74. Although Khamenei had strong reservations with Mousavi, as a compromise with the left-leaning parliament, agreed to offer Mousavi for the post of premier. On 28 October 1981, with the approval of Khomeini, the parliament approved Mousavi with a vote of 115 to 39 to become the 79th prime minister of Iran on 31 October 1981.

The conflicts between Mousavi (who belonged to the left wing of the Islamic Republic) and Ali Khamenei (a future Supreme Leader of Iran who belonged to the right wing of the Islamic Republic) continued during their eight years of shared governance. However, an escalation in conflicts between the two led to Mousavi's resignation shortly after the end of the Iran–Iraq War in 1988. As the prime minister, Mousavi had the full backing of Ruhollah Khomeini, the supreme leader, and he refused to accept his resignation. While his government was viewed as somewhat liberal, he was still under the pressure of hardliners, though Khomeini generally protected Mousavi from the conservatives and gave him a free rein in deciding actions for the economy. However, his involvement in security matters remained less clear, and it was disputed whether or not Mousavi was involved in the killing of thousands of dissidents and minorities in Kurdistan and Mazandaran during this time. It has generally been accepted that Mousavi and Mohsen Rezaee (who was in charge of the Revolutionary Guards during this time) have never been close, though he was in charge of foreign operations, particularly in Lebanon.

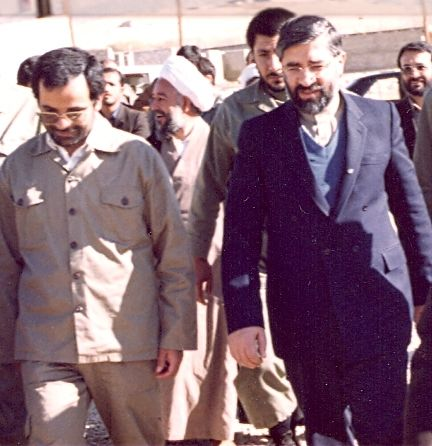
Mousavi and Abbas Mirza Abutalebi during the Iran–Iraq War

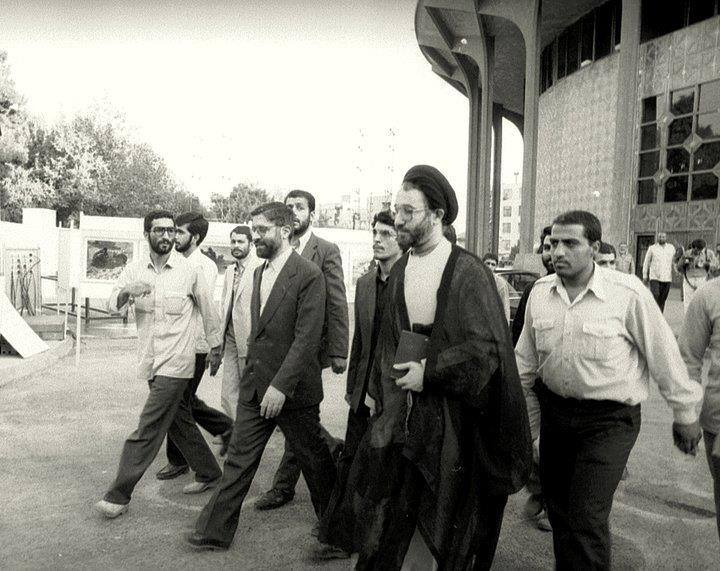
Mousavi with Mohammad Khatami, then Culture Minister, and the next President in 1985

Mousavi's premiership coincided with the Iran–Iraq War. He guided the country through its war with Iraq, and earned popular acclaim for his stewardship of the national economy. He pioneered a bond-based economy, which many believe was responsible for a fair distribution of goods among the people throughout the Iran–Iraq War. Many analysts praise his handling of Iran's economy, his civil and economic leadership during the Iran–Iraq War, and his efforts to end Iran's international isolation. Others remember him as being "unpredictable" and less able to navigate Iran's labyrinthine political system than his rivals. In 1986, Mousavi played a great role in the Iran–Contra affair and secret negotiations and dealing with USA on helping them free the American hostages in Lebanon, in return for sale of the American weapons and spare-parts that Iran's army badly needed for the Iran–Iraq War.

A year after the end of the Iran–Iraq War on 20 August 1988, Ruhollah Khomeini died (June 3, 1989), and Ali Khamenei was elected as the new Supreme Leader by the Assembly of Experts. Following his death, Mousavi and his fellow left-wingers lost their main source of support within the establishment. During the parliament hearing on post-war reconstruction plans, Mousavi had heated arguments with Ali Akbar Hashemi Rafsanjani, the speaker of Iran's parliament at the time, over Rafsanjani's suggestion that Iran accept the offer of western countries to help with post-war reconstruction.

On 28 July 1989, the constitution was amended and approved by Iranian voters in a national referendum with a 97% yes vote. At this time, Mehdi Karrubi had been elected as the new speaker of the parliament, to whom the amended constitution was declared. One of these amendments abolished the position of Prime Minister. Rafsanjani was elected as the fourth president of Iran on 28 July 1989, and became the president on 16 August 1989. Mousavi's premiership ended on the same date. Mousavi was not invited to be a participant in the new government headed by Rafsanjani, and disappeared from the public sphere.

=== Early stance on pre-revolutionary icons ===
Some pre-revolutionary filmmakers have accounts about celebrities who have been hurt by Mousavi's positions in his early years in office. Saeed Motalebi, an established writer and director in the pre-revolutionary era, has one of such accounts that refers to the 1982 film The Imperilled (Barzakhi-ha) which was written by him and had four pre-revolutionary male stars in the lead roles. It was directed by Iraj Ghaderi and, with its patriotic story about resisting foreign invasion, it was a chance for Fardin, Malek-Motiei, Ghaderi and Rad to renew their threatened careers as actors in the post-revolutionary atmosphere. The film was a hit and became the highest grossing Iranian film of all time in its short period of screening in theaters. But it was soon banned and consequently the four actors were banned from working. About how the film's success was turned into disaster, Motalebi says:

One Friday Mr. Mohsen Makhmalbaf gathered a couple of people and they started collecting signatures for a petition which was written on a scroll, stating that "We have made a revolution while these actors are transgressors." They did it right in front of that theater in the Revolution Square near the university of Tehran. They said "Look how theaters are crowded while Friday events are deserted." That's how they stopped my film. Then a reporter who was queued to ask something about our film, went and told the then prime minister (Mir-Hossein Mousavi) "There is a film in theaters whose writer wants to convey that people who are fighting in the fronts are problematic persons." The prime minister replied "These are leftovers of junk intellectuals who will soon go to the dustbin of history." Malek-Motiei became jobless and turned his garage into a pastry shop. Ghaderi put some rice bags in his office and became a rice dealer. Fardin opened a pastry shop too and when I went to visit him, I used to wait outside as long as there were no customers so that he wouldn't feel ashamed when he saw me. These were all caused by those illogical efforts which I will never forgive.

=== 1988 prison massacres ===
On 12 December 2018 Amnesty International published an interview of the Austrian national public service ORF (broadcaster), on 13 December 1988, with Mir Hossein Mousavi. Mousavi was asked about the mass executions inside Iran's prison at the time he was in office. Mousavi replied, “We repressed them”. Amnesty's report criticizes Mousavi's response asserting that “without explaining what he is acknowledging ... he focuses on criticizing the July 1988 armed incursion by the People’s Mojahedin Organization of Iran (PMOI).” The report goes on to say:

Since 2009, when he re-entered politics as a Reformist opposition leader, Mir Hossein Mousavi’s response when asked about the 1988 prison massacres has often been to avoid commenting or to claim that they took place without the knowledge of his government. In this way, he has tried to justify his failure to stop, investigate or at least condemn the killings publicly. However, documents from Amnesty International’s archives show that the organization repeatedly raised its concerns about reports of mass prisoner executions with senior officials in Mir Hossein Mousavi’s government.

== Retirement from politics (1989–2009) ==
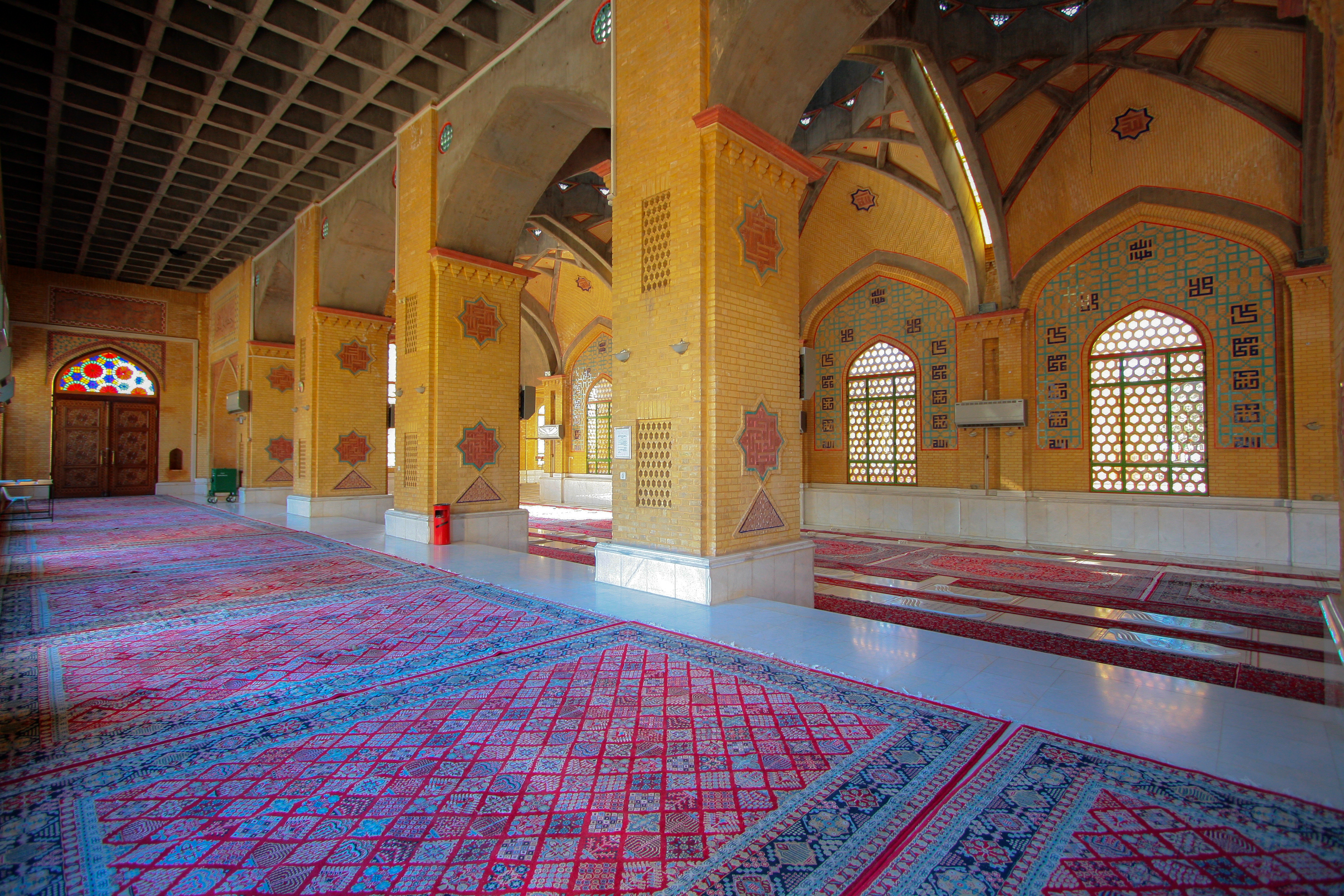
The Hafte Tir bombing victims' mausoleum, which is designed by Mousavi

When Khomeini, the founder of the Islamic Republic, died in 1989, Mousavi was no longer welcome in the government. It was the start of 20 years of an almost total absence from public life for Mousavi, which many considered as a sign of his disapproval of the established government, though he did sit on two high-level government councils.

In 1989, Ali Khamenei named him as a member of the Expediency Discernment Council. He was removed from the council in 2011, when Khamenei renewed the body's membership without him. Mousavi was a member of the Supreme Council of Cultural Revolution from 1996 until June 2011, when Khamenei issued a new membership decree that omitted him. He was also the political adviser of president Akbar Hashemi Rafsanni (1989–1997) and senior adviser of president Mohammed Khatami (1997–2005).

During these years, he partly retired from politics and returned to architecture and teaching, becoming President of the Iranian Academy of Arts, one of the four academies of the Islamic Republic of Iran. The main building of the Academy is designed by him. At the same time, he developed his passion for painting and writing poetry. He was a professor at Shahid Beheshti University and later joined the Academic staff of Tarbiat Modares University. His main field is architecture, and buildings such as Kanoon-e Tohid in Tehran, Beynolharamein Bazaar in Shiraz, Haft-e-tir Martyr's tomb in Tehran's Behesht-e Zahra, and Salman mosque in the presidential residence are examples of his work. In recent years, he has been more active in painting and has participated in many exhibitions.

== Presidential candidacy, result protests and dissent (2009–present) ==
=== Pre-2009 ===
Mousavi refused to run for the presidency in the 1997 elections, which caused the reformists to turn to his former Cabinet Minister, then a little-known cleric, Mohammad Khatami, who was elected by a landslide. During Khatami's administration, Mousavi served as the Senior Adviser to the President.

Mousavi was considered the leading candidate from the reformist alliance to run in the 2005 Iranian presidential election. However, on 12 October 2004, he officially declined the proposal after a meeting with President Mohammad Khatami and the two other top members of one of Iran's main Reformist parties, the Association of Combatant Clerics, Mehdi Karroubi and Mohammad Mousavi-Khoiniha.

=== 2009 presidential candidacy ===
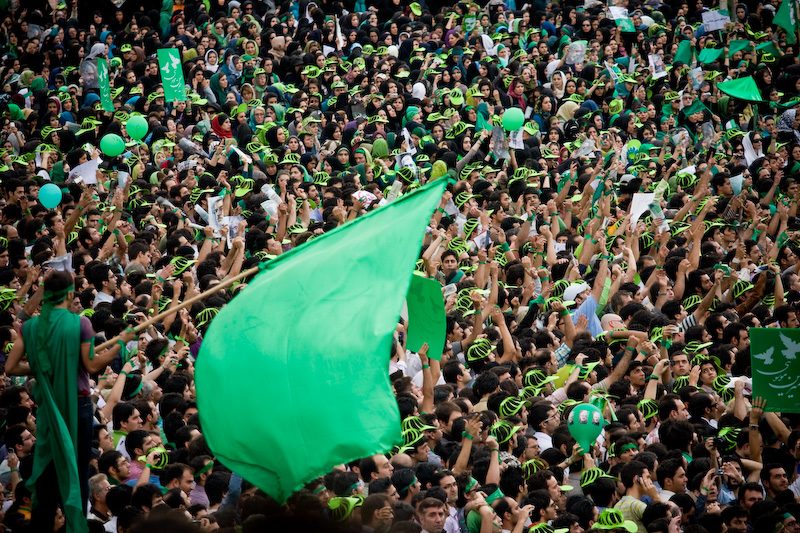
Mousavi supporters in Tehran

After 20 years of political silence, on 9 March 2009, Mousavi announced his intention to run in the 2009 Iranian presidential election. He stated that his main goals were: to institutionalize social justice, equality and fairness, freedom of expression, to root out corruption and to speed up Iran's stagnant process of privatization, and thus move Iran away from what he called "an alms-based economy". Mousavi criticized the then-current conservative President, Mahmoud Ahmadinejad, for his alleged economic mismanagement, asking, when Iran "was making profits from the high prices of oil, did he (Ahmadinejad) envisage a situation when the prices would fall?" On 16 March 2009, the former Iranian President Khatami withdrew from the election in support of Mir-Hossein Mousavi.

==== Platform ====
Mousavi ran as an independent Principled Reformist candidate. Although he is one of the original founders of the Iranian reformist camp, he shares many principles of the conservatives. Many reformist parties, among them reformist Islamic Iranian Participation Front, whose main candidate was Khatami, have supported his candidacy after the latter withdrew from the race. Many supporters of the reformist movement, however, objected to Mousavi's candidacy on the grounds that he was not committed to the principles of the reformist parties. Although Mousavi stated that he was not running as a reformist, he indicated that he welcomed the support of different parties, both reformist and conservative. He started his campaign from the center of Iranian politics; over time, he shifted more towards the left by declaring his support for reforms. Although some active members of the conservative camp, such as Emad Afroogh, as well as the conservative newspaper Jomhouri-e Eslami, supported Mousavi's candidacy, he did not receive the official backing of any major conservative party. His candidacy made it harder for the conservatives to support Mahmoud Ahmadinejad, and large conservative parties, such as the Combatant Clergy Association, did not back the current President for a second term of office.

==== Domestic policies ====
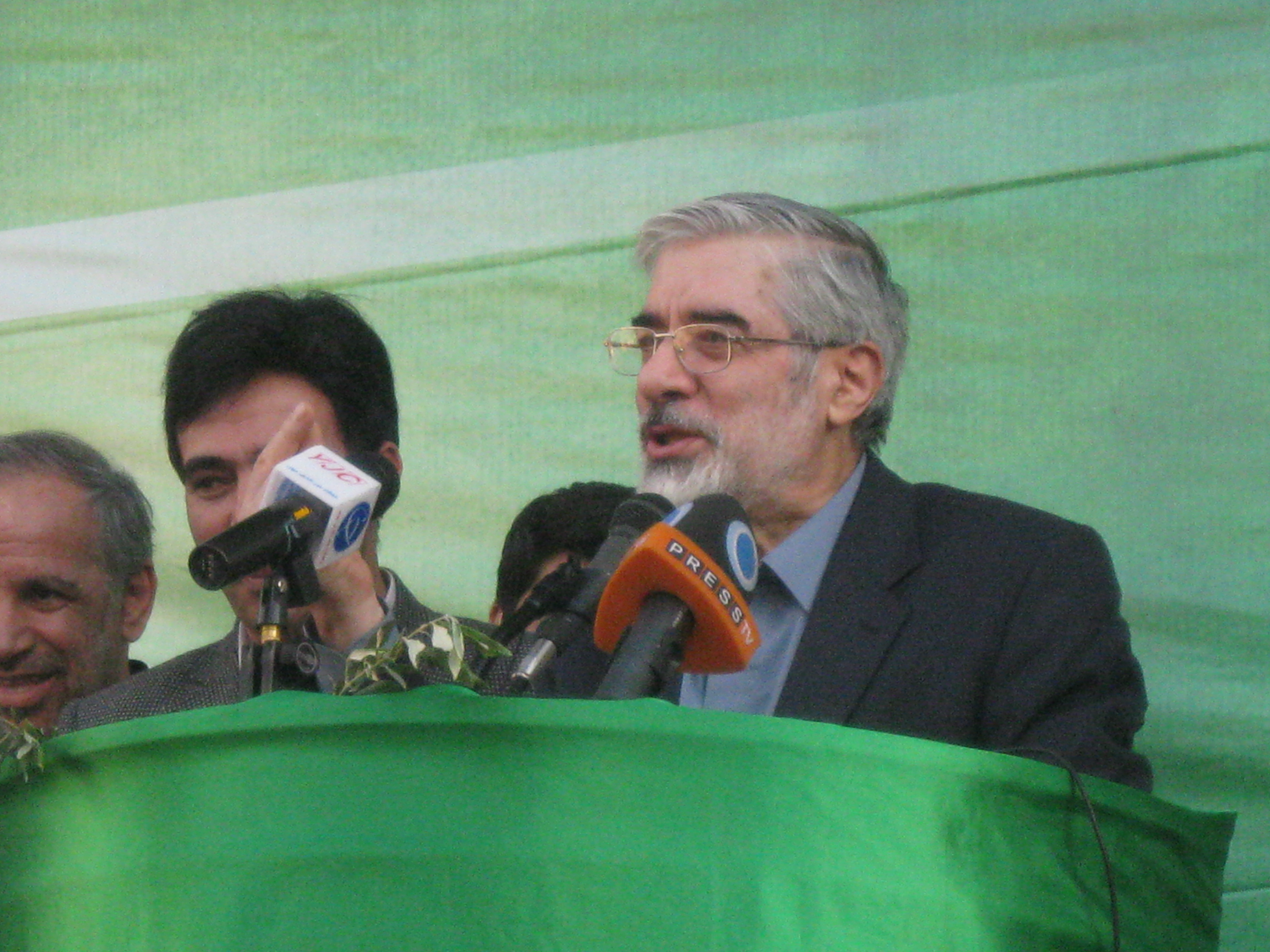
Mousavi speaking in Zanjan during presidential campaign

Mousavi had on numerous occasions indicated his wish to change the constitution in order to remove the existing ban on the private ownership of television stations (currently all Iranian television stations are state-owned), as well as transfer the control of the law-enforcement forces to the President (so that they represent the people, since the people directly elect the President through popular vote) from the Supreme Leader. He said that "the issue of non-compliance with the Iranian rules and regulations is the biggest problem that the country is currently faced with" and that he wished to put in place ways to enforce the laws further, and that it was also important to bring an end to keeping the populace uninformed about government matters. Among his policies were creation of a free environment for the flow of information and corrections to the national budget. He wanted to promote the creation of private, non-governmental TV networks and stop the operation of the "Moral Police". He has spoken about his opposition to massive changes in ministries, which he claims is what Ahmadinejad has done.

The BBC reported that Mousavi "called for greater personal freedoms in Iran and criticized the ban on private television channels", but "refused to back down from the country's disputed nuclear programme, saying it was "for peaceful purposes". Regarding the Iranian nuclear program, his plan includes a reduction of the cost by opposing radical approaches while maintaining what he sees as "Iran's right to civilian nuclear technology". Mousavi has stated that giving up the country's nuclear program would be "irreparable" and that the Iranian people support the nuclear program. "No one in Iran will accept suspension," Mousavi has said, adding that if elected, his policy would be to work to provide "guarantees" that Tehran's nuclear activities would never divert to non-peaceful aims.

On 30 May, Mousavi pledged that if elected he would amend "discriminatory and unjust regulations" against women, and take other measures in favour of women's rights and equality. He said that he would seek to disband the so-called morality police force, and ensure that Iranian women are treated equally, with the ability to attain financial empowerment and to serve at the highest levels of decision making bodies.

==== Foreign policies ====
Mousavi directly addressed activating foreign policy to boost national interest by reducing tensions with other nations. This included negotiating with U.S. President Barack Obama if "his actions are in keeping with his words". He condemned Ahmadinejad's attitude toward The Holocaust (namely, that it was "a myth"), and condemned the killing of Jews in the Holocaust.

=== Protests to the election results ===
The election was held on 12 June 2009. The official results showed Ahmadinejad winning by a landslide, though Mousavi and many others believed the results to be fraudulent, suggesting that the Interior Minister, Sadegh Mahsouli, an ally of Ahmadinejad, interfered with the election and distorted the votes to keep Ahmadinejad in power. Mousavi has claimed victory, and called for his supporters to celebrate it, sparking large protests as a result.

"Previously, he was revolutionary, because everyone inside the system was a revolutionary. But now he's a reformer. Now he knows Gandhi – before he knew only Che Guevara. If we gain power through aggression we would have to keep it through aggression. That is why we're having a green revolution, defined by peace and democracy."

— Mohsen Makhmalbaf, Mousavi's spokesman, 19 June 2009

Due to protests, from the opposition, the Supreme Leader ordered a partial recount of the election results. The recount was a random counting of 10% of the ballots. In order to create transparency, a 12-member council showed the recount on television, and concluded that President Ahmadinejad still led Mousavi after the recount. After the recount, the Guardian council certified the election, and concluded no evidence of irregularities, and closed the dossier on the election.

=== Beginning of the Green Movement ===
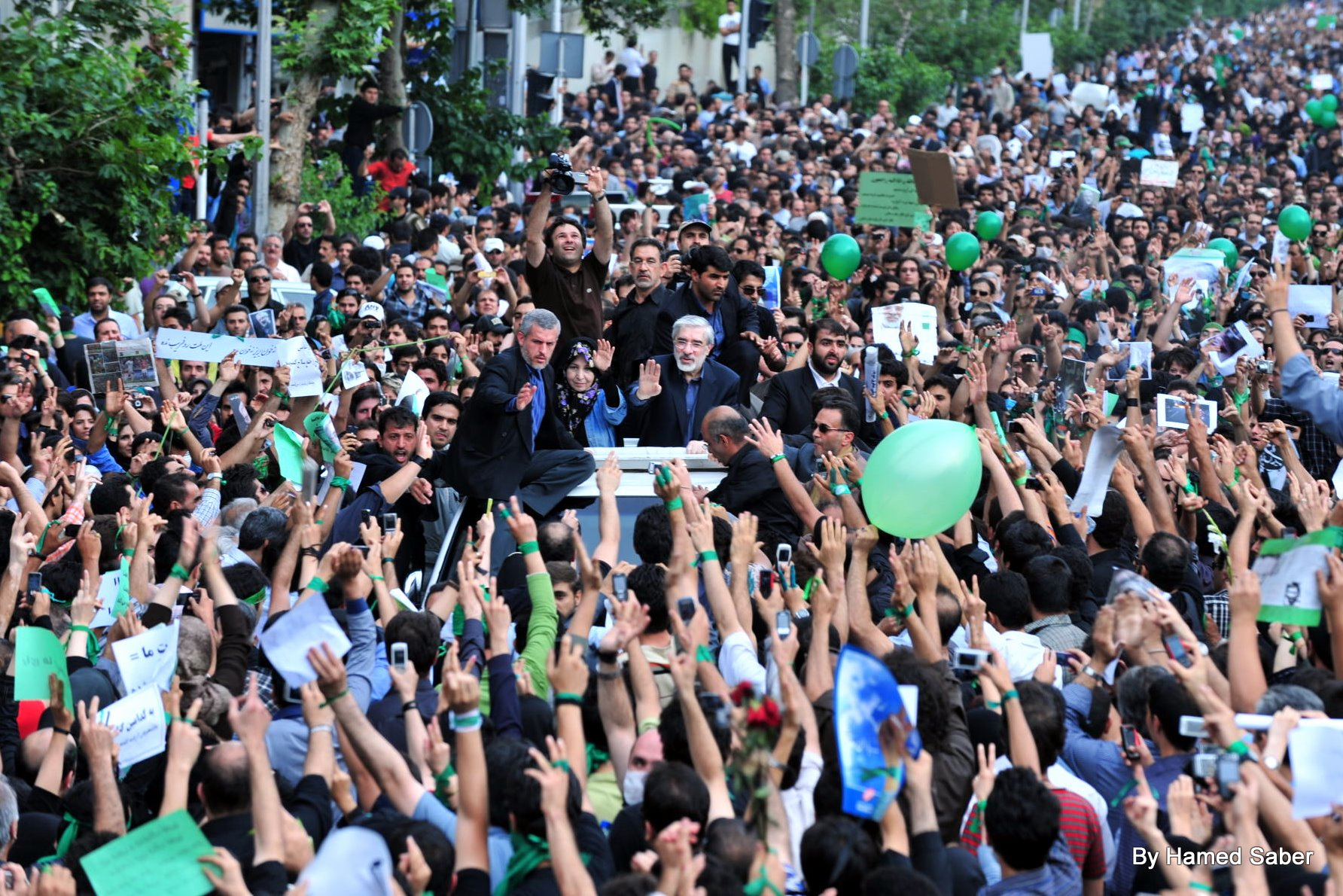
Mousavi at the protests of 2009

The Iranian Green Movement refers to a series of actions after the Iranian presidential election in 2009, in which protesters demanded the removal of Mahmoud Ahmadinejad from office.

Mousavi, Mehdi Karroubi, Hossein-Ali Montazeri and Mohammad Khatami are recognized as leaders of the Green Movement. Where is my vote? (Persian: رای من کجاست؟) was a motto used during the protests. Anti-Ahmadinejad protesters chanted the English-language phrase in numbers not seen since the 1979 Iranian Revolution, in an attempt to receive international attention. The Iranian Government had released results claiming a two-thirds majority for Ahmadinejad, but supporters of Mousavi and Karroubi, the moderate opposition leaders, accused the government of rigging the vote.

In the aftermath of the election and ensuing comments by Ahmadinejad and other conservative leaders, calling the opposition "a pile of dust" (خس و خاشاک), protests were widened and massive peaceful protests were held around the country. Although the Iranian government prohibited any gatherings of protesters in Tehran and across the country, significantly slowed down internet access, and censored any form of media supporting the opposition, hundreds of thousands of Iranians marched in defiance. Large numbers of protesters were arrested, and several were killed by the police and militia forces Basij. Neda Agha-soltan and Sohrab Aarabi were among the victims, and alleged cases of rape in prison (Taraneh Mousavi) were also uncovered.

Since the election, the government has severely restricted the access of foreign and Iranian media to footage and information relating to opposition activities. As a result, scenes of the massive street protests and more frequent student protests have been filmed by participants themselves.

=== Death of Mousavi's nephew ===
Seyed Ali Mousavi was the nephew of Mousavi. Ali Mousavi died on 27 December 2009, during the 2009 Iranian election protests, when he was reportedly shot in either the back or the chest by security forces during demonstrations against Mahmoud Ahmadinejad's contested election win.

Iranian filmmaker Mohsen Makhmalbaf, the official spokesman of Mir-Hossein Moussavi's campaign abroad, told BBC News in an interview that Iranian secret police had called Seyed Ali Mousavi several times, days before he was shot, saying: "We will kill you."

After he died, his body was taken to Ebn-e Sina hospital, where protesters demonstrated outside. The protesters were broken up with tear gas by the Iranian security forces. It was later revealed that the government had removed his body and taken it to an undisclosed location in an attempt to crack down on the protests.

=== The Green Path of Hope ===
Mousavi and other reformist leaders are now working with peaceful and legal methods to widen the influence of their reforms. They have set up a new coalition, named The Green Path of Hope. Iranian political parties and movements need to be authorized by the Interior Ministry. Mousavi neither recognizes the current government as legitimate, nor is likely to receive permission; the movement was named a "path" in order bypass this law.

The Green Path of Hope seeks to continue protests against Ahmadinejad's presidency following lawful and peaceful methods, and the full execution of the constitution, as Mousavi says:

You can't follow some parts of the constitution and throw the rest into a bin.

Mousavi is quoted in describing the movement:

The Green Path of Hope is formed for the sake of people’s rightful demands and for claiming their rights... the color green is the symbol of this movement; its slogan is demanding the impeccable implementation of the constitution, and innumerable self-motivated independent societies form the body of this movement.

According to organization officials, the movement encompasses numerous political parties, NGOs and social networks. Mousavi emphasized that existent, autonomous social networks in the community are part of this movement:

During the election, our mottos supported and remained in the framework of the constitution; today we are devoted to those slogans. We believe that if the people's demands were treated fairly, instead of being distorted by the media and linked to foreigners, and the government promoted truth by fair criticism, our mottos could satisfy the public.

The "Green Path" has six main members on its central council, who are connected to reformist parties, NGOs, and social networks. The main body will be ordinary protesters. The strategy is to connect existent pressures and issues in society in a social network, and to therefore lead protests in a lawful manner.

=== Arab Spring ===
In the wake of the Tunisian and Egyptian revolutions, Green movement leaders in Iran called for demonstrations on 14 February 2011. The government responded by placing leaders of the movement under house arrest, and on 14 February Iranian state TV broadcast images of "some 50 conservative MPs marching through parliament's main hall" chanting "Death to Mousavi, death to Karroubi".

=== House arrest ===
Mousavi and his wife, as well as Mehdi Karoubi, another opposition figure, were put under house arrest after they urged their supporters to organize demonstrations in support of uprisings in the Arab world in February 2011. On 2 February 2013, Iran's security forces arrested Mousavi's two daughters, Zahra and Nargess Mousavi, in their home. The semi-official news agency ILNA reported that they were questioned, and then freed the same day. After the election of Hassan Rouhani as President in 2013, it was announced that Mousavi and Rahnavard would soon be freed from house arrest. However, as of 2021, he was still under house arrest.

In 2019, Mousavi was given the right to exit his home once a week. In addition, his immediate family were also able to visit him anytime. They were also given permission to use a mobile phone and satellite television.

Mousavi's house was reportedly damaged by combined Israeli and American missile strikes on 28 February 2026.

== Political and academic posts ==
- Member of Central Campaign of Islamic Republican Party (1979–1981)
- Head of Political Office of Islamic Republican Party (1980–1981)
- Editor-in-chief of Islamic Republican (1981)
- Minister of Foreign Affairs (1981)
- President of Council of Cultural Revolution (1981)
- Prime Minister of Iran (1981–1989)
- President of Mostazafen Foundation of Islamic Revolution (1981–1989)
- President of Economy Council (1982–1989)
- Political adviser of president Hashemi Rafsanjani (1989–1997)
- Senior adviser of President Khatami (1997–2005)
- Member of Expediency Discernment Council (1989–2012)
- Member of Supreme Council of Cultural Revolution (1996–2012)
- President of Iranian Academy of Arts (2000–2009)
- Leader of Green Movement and The Green Path of Hope (2009– )

== See also ==
- Shia opposition to the Islamic Republic of Iran

== Notes ==
Political offices
Preceded by Mohammad Ali Rajai as Acting Minister	Minister of Foreign Affairs; 1981	Succeeded by Ali Akbar Velayati
Preceded by Mohammad-Reza Mahdavi Kani as Acting Prime Minister	Prime Minister of Iran; 1981–1989	Position abolished
Military offices
Vacant Title last held by Abbas Gharabaghi as Head of the Bozorg Arteshtaran's Headquarters	Head of the Commander-in-Chief's Headquarters; 1988–1989	Succeeded by Hassan Firouzabadi as Chief-of-Staff of the Iranian Armed Forces
Party political offices
New title	Head of Political Bureau of the Islamic Republican Party; 1979–1981	Vacant Unknown
Academic offices
New title Academy established	President of Iranian Academy of the Arts; 1998–2009	Succeeded by Ali Mo'alem Damghani
Media offices
New title Newspaper established	Editor-in-chief of Islamic Republican newspaper 1979–1981	Succeeded by Masih Mohajeri
