= Ministry of Defence and Armed Forces Logistics (Iran) =

Government ministry of Iran

- وزارت دفاع و پشتیبانی نیروهای مسلح; Vezârat-e defa' va poštibâni-ye niruhâ-ye mosallah
- Insignia

- Flag

Agency overview
- Formed: 1858
- Type: Government ministry
- Jurisdiction: Government of the Islamic Republic of Iran
- Annual budget: $1.53 billion (2020–21)
- Minister responsible: Mehrdad Akhlaghi
- Website: http://www.mod.ir/

The Ministry of Defence and Armed Forces Logistics (MODAFL; Persian: وزارت دفاع و پشتیبانی نیروهای مسلح, romanized: vezârat-e defa' va poštibâni-ye niruhâ-ye mosallah) is the defence ministry of Iran and part of the country's executive branch. It thus reports to the President of Iran, not to the Commander-in-Chief of the Iranian Armed Forces.

Unlike many countries, the ministry is not involved with in-the-field military operational command of the armed forces. Instead it is responsible for planning, logistics and funding of the Armed Forces of the Islamic Republic of Iran while the General Staff of the Armed Forces of the Islamic Republic of Iran, a separate institution under command of the supreme leader of Iran, has control over the forces. The MODAFL is also the major player in the defence industry of Iran, with multiple conglomerates and subordinates active in research and development, maintenance and manufacturing of military equipment. It annually exports military equipment manufactured in Iran to forces of countries such as Syria (until 2024), Iraq, Venezuela, and Sudan (the latter ceased in 2019), as well as non-state actors like Hezbollah in Lebanon.

The ministry is considered one of the three "sovereign" ministerial bodies of Iran due to nature of its work at home and abroad.

== History ==
Emblem of the Former Ministry of War

From the mid-1940s, U.S. Army and later Air Force officers of the Army Mission Iran and later Military Assistance Advisory Group Iran (ARMISH-MAAG) were closely involved in providing a range of advice, support, and reorganizational assistance.

=== 1952–53: Reforms under Mossadegh ===
When Mohammad Mosaddegh took over the ministry on 21 July 1952, he initiated a series of reforms in the ministry. He named General Ahmad Wosouq as his deputy and renamed the ministry from 'War' to 'National Defence', cut the military budget by 15%, and vowed to only purchase defensive military equipment. Two investigatory commissions were formed, one for examining previous promotions and the other for materiel procurement. Under Mossadegh, some 15,000 personnel were transferred from the army to the gendarmerie and 136 officers, including 15 general officers, were purged.

=== 1982–89: Two ministries ===
The Islamic Revolutionary Guard Corps had between 1982 and 1989 its own dedicated defence ministry, mirroring the existing ministry of defence which solely supplied the Islamic Republic of Iran Army during this period. Under President Akbar Hashemi Rafsanjani in 1989, the two ministries were merged into one in order to cease parallel work and reduce interservice rivalry.

== Subordinates ==
Iranian military industry, under the command of the Ministry of Defence, is composed of the following main components:

Organization	Field of activity
Iran Electronics Industries (SAIRAN)	Electronics, communications, e-warfare, radars, satellites, etc.
Defence Industries Organization (SASAD)	Tanks, rockets, bombs, guns, armored vehicles, etc.
Aerospace Industries Organization (AIO)	Guided missiles systems, etc.
Aviation Industries Organization (IAIO)	Aircraft, UAV, helicopters, etc.
Marine Industries Organization (MIO)	Ships, hovercraft, submarines, etc.
Organization of Defensive Innovation and Research (SPND)	Defence related research and development.
National Geographical Organization of Iran (NGO)	Matters related to military maps, national borders and geographical services required by the Armed Forces.
Malek-Ashtar University of Technology (MUT)	The ministry's educational institution

In August 2018, the Iranian Ministry of Defence declared it had offloaded its shares in Wagon Pars and Iran Airtour. In November 2020, the head of the Research and Innovation Organisation of the defence ministry, the nuclear physicist Mohsen Fakhrizadeh, was assassinated in an ambush near Tehran.

=== Aerospace Industries Organization ===
Aerospace Industries Organization (AIO, Persian: سازمان صنایع هوافضا) is a subordinate of the Iranian defence ministry and a leading high-tech complex headquartered in Tehran. It is a key player in development and production of space assets of Iran, and has some research center and factory under its control. Shahab ballistic missiles are one of notable products manufactured by the organization.

== Ministers of War (1858–1979) ==
Reign of the Qajar dynasty

- Mirza Mohammad Khan Sepahsalar (1858 – 1866)
- Aziz Khan Mokri (1866 – 1868)
- Firuz Mirza (1868 – 1871)
- Mirza Hossein Sepahsalar (September 1871 – 1873)
- Firuz Mirza (1873 – 1874)
- Mohammad Rahim Khan Ala ad-Dowleh (1874 – 1874)
- Mirza Hossein Sepahsalar (1874 – 1880)
- Kamran Mirza (1880 – July 1896)
- Mohammad Baqir Khan Shoja al-Saltaneh (July 1896 – November 1896)
- Abdol-Hossein Farman Farma (25 November 1896 – October 1897)
- Vajihollah Mirza Sepahsalar (October 1897 – 18 January 1905)
- Kamran Mirza (February 1906 – August 1906)
- Hoseyn Pasha Khan Amir Bahador (August 1906 – 28 August 1906)
- Mohammad Taqi Dabir al-Dawla (28 August 1906 – 10 March 1907)
- Kamran Mirza (21 March 1907 – 3 May 1907)
- Mostowfi ol-Mamalek (3 May 1907 – 22 July 1908)
- Hoseyn Pasha Khan Amir Bahador (22 July 1908 – 2 May 1909)
- Mostowfi ol-Mamalek (2 May 1909 – 17 July 1909)
- Mohammad Vali Khan (17 July 1909 – 28 April 1910)
- Ali-Qoli Khan Bakhtiari (28 April 1910 – 24 July 1910)
- Ahmad Qavam (24 July 1910 – 11 March 1911)
- Abdol-Hossein Farman Farma (11 March 1911 – 11 March 1911)
- Mohammad Vali Khan (11 March 1911 – 18 July 1911)
- Najaf-Qoli Khan Bakhtiari (18 July 1911 – 31 July 1911)
- Gholam Hossein Khan Bakhtiari (31 July 1911 – 18 January 1913)
- Mostowfi ol-Mamalek (18 January 1913 – 17 August 1914)
- Gholam Hossein Khan Bakhtiari (17 August 1914 – 14 March 1915)
- Hassan Pirnia (14 March 1915 – 30 April 1915)
- Abdol Majid Mirza (30 April 1915 – 17 August 1915)
- Mohammad Vali Khan (17 August 1915 – 4 March 1916)
- Jamshid Khan Sardar Kabir (4 March 1916 – 29 August 1916)
- Abolfath Khan Valatabar (29 August 1916 – 5 June 1917)
- Hassan Pirnia (5 June 1917 – 30 April 1918)
- Lotf Ali Khan Bakhtiari (30 April 1918 – 18 June 1918)
- Gholam Hossein Khan Bakhtiari (18 June 1918 – 7 August 1918)
- Qasem Khan Vali (7 August 1918 – 12 October 1918)
- Fathollah Khan Akbar (12 October 1918 – 3 July 1920)
- Mehdi Vosough al-Saltaneh (3 July 1920 – 26 October 1920)
- Abdollah Khan Hamadani (27 October 1920 – 21 February 1921)
- Masood Khan Keyhan (24 February 1921 – 27 April 1921)
- Reza Shah (27 April 1921 – 19 December 1925)

Reign of Reza Shah

- Amir Abdollah Tahmasebi (19 December 1925 – 3 July 1926)
- Mohammad Ali Foroughi (3 July 1926 – 2 June 1927)
- Amir Abdollah Tahmasebi (2 June 1927 – April 1928)
- Jafar-Qoli Asad (April 1928 – October 1934)
- Ahmad Nakhjavan (October 1934 – 14 April 1936) (Acting)
- Esmail Amir-Fazli (14 April 1936 – 26 October 1939) (Acting)
- Ahmad Nakhjavan (26 October 1939 – 28 August 1941) (Acting)

Reign of Mohammad Reza Shah

- Ahmad Nakhjavan (28 August 1941 – 31 August 1941) (Acting)
- Mohammad Ali Foroughi (31 August 1941 – 9 March 1942) (Acting)
- Amanullah Jahanbani (9 March 1942 – 10 August 1942)
- Ahmad Qavam (10 August 1942 – 23 December 1942)
- Ahmad Amir-Ahmadi (23 December 1942 – 27 March 1944)
- Ebrahim Zand (27 March 1944 – 22 September 1944)
- Mohammad Hossein Mirza Firouz (22 September 1944 – 12 October 1944)
- Abdollah Hedayat (12 October 1944 – 26 November 1944) (Acting)
- Ebrahim Zand (26 November 1944 – 4 November 1945)
- Ali Riazi (4 November 1945 – 17 February 1946)
- Ahmad Amir-Ahmadi (17 February 1946 – 27 December 1947)
- Morteza Yazdanpanah (27 December 1947 – 22 June 1948)
- Ahmad Amir-Ahmadi (22 June 1948 – 26 February 1950)
- Morteza Yazdanpanah (26 February 1950 – 2 July 1950)
- Abdollah Hedayat (2 July 1950 – 8 April 1951)
- Ali-Asghar Naghdi (8 April 1951 – 1 December 1951)
- Morteza Yazdanpanah (1 December 1951 – 27 July 1952)
- Mohammad Mosaddegh (27 July 1952 – 19 August 1953)
- Abdollah Hedayat (19 August 1953 – 17 September 1955)
- Ahmad Wosouq (17 September 1955 – 6 May 1961)
- Ali-Asghar Naghdi (6 May 1961 – 30 September 1963)
- Asadollah Sanii (30 September 1963 – 2 January 1971) (Acting: 30 September 1963 – 9 March 1964)
- Reza Azimi (2 January 1971 – 6 January 1979)
- Jafar Shafaghat (6 January 1979 – 11 February 1979)

== Ministers of Defence since 1979 ==
No.	Portrait	Minister	Took office	Left office	Time in office	Defence branch	Cabinet
Minister of National Defence
1	Ahmad Madani	Commodore; Ahmad Madani (1929–2006)	22 February 1979	31 March 1979	37 days	Army (Navy)	Bazargan
2	Taghi Riahi	Brigadier general Taghi Riahi (1911–1989)	31 March 1979	18 September 1979	171 days	Army (Ground Force)	Bazargan
–	Ezatollah Nooraei [fa]	Brigadier general Ezatollah Nooraei; Acting	18 September 1979	8 October 1979	20 days	Army (Ground Force)	Bazargan
3	Mostafa Chamran	Mostafa Chamran (1932–1981)	8 October 1979	10 September 1980	338 days	IWH	Bazargan; Council of the Islamic Revolution; Rajai
4	Javad Fakoori	Colonel; Javad Fakoori (1936–1981)	10 September 1980	17 August 1981	341 days	Army (Air Force)	Rajai
5	Mousa Namjoo	Colonel; Mousa Namjoo (1938–1981)	17 August 1981	29 September 1981 †	43 days	Army (Ground Force)	Bahonar; Mahdavi Kani (interim)
6	Mohammad Salimi	Colonel; Mohammad Salimi (1937–2016)	2 November 1981	14 August 1984	2 years, 286 days	Army (Ground Force)	Mir-Hossein Mousavi I
Minister of Defence
–	Mir-Hossein Mousavi	Mir-Hossein Mousavi (born 1942); Acting	20 August 1984	21 October 1984	32 days	None	Mir-Hossein Mousavi I
–	Mohammad-Reza Rahimi	Colonel; Mohammad-Reza Rahimi (1936–2021); Acting	21 October 1984	28 October 1985	1 year, 37 days	Army (Ground Force)	Mir-Hossein Mousavi I
7	Mohammad Hossein Jalali	Colonel; Mohammad Hossein Jalali (born 1936)	28 October 1985	29 August 1989	3 years, 305 days	Army (Ground Force)	Mir-Hossein Mousavi II
Minister of Defence and Armed Forces Logistics
8	Akbar Torkan	Akbar Torkan (1952–2021)	29 August 1989	16 August 1993	3 years, 352 days	None	Rafsanjani I
9	Mohammad Forouzandeh	Brigadier general Mohammad Forouzandeh (born 1960)	16 August 1993	20 August 1997	4 years, 4 days	IRGC	Rafsanjani II
10	Ali Shamkhani	Rear admiral Ali Shamkhani (1955–2026)	20 August 1997	24 August 2005	8 years, 4 days	IRGC (Navy) ↓ Army (Navy)	Khatami I Khatami II
11	Mostafa Mohammad-Najjar	Brigadier general Mostafa Mohammad-Najjar (born 1956)	24 August 2005	3 September 2009	4 years, 10 days	IRGC (Ground Force)	Ahmadinejad I
12	Ahmad Vahidi	Brigadier general Ahmad Vahidi (born 1958)	3 September 2009	15 August 2013	3 years, 346 days	IRGC (Quds Force)	Ahmadinejad II
13	Hossein Dehghan	Brigadier general Hossein Dehghan (born 1957)	15 August 2013	20 August 2017	4 years, 5 days	IRGC (Aerospace Force)	Rouhani I
14	Amir Hatami	Brigadier general Amir Hatami (born c. 1965/1966)	20 August 2017	25 August 2021	4 years, 5 days	Army (Ground Force)	Rouhani II
15	Mohammad-Reza Gharaei Ashtiani	Brigadier general Mohammad-Reza Gharaei Ashtiani (born 1960)	25 August 2021	21 August 2024	2 years, 362 days	Army (Ground Force)	Raisi
16	Aziz Nasirzadeh	Brigadier general Aziz Nasirzadeh (1965–2026)	21 August 2024	28 February 2026 †	1 year, 191 days	Army (Air Force)	Pezeshkian
–	Majid Ebn-e-Reza	Brigadier general Majid Ebn-e-Reza (born 1964); Acting	2 March 2026	18 October 2026	230 days	IRGC	Pezeshkian
17	Mehrdad Akhlaghi	Mehrdad Akhlaghi (born 1958)	18 October 2026	Incumbent	14 days	None	Pezeshkian

== See also ==
- Islamic Republic of Iran Mine Action Center (2003)
- Military budget of Iran
- Aerospace Industries Organization
- Ammunition Industries Group
- Organization of Defensive Innovation and Research

== Further readings ==
- Ministry of Defense and Armed Forces Logistics (MODAFL)
- Anthony H. Cordesman, Iran's military forces in transition
