= Aziz Nasirzadeh =

Iranian general (1964–2026)

Amir Aziz Nasirzadeh
- عزیز نصیرزاده
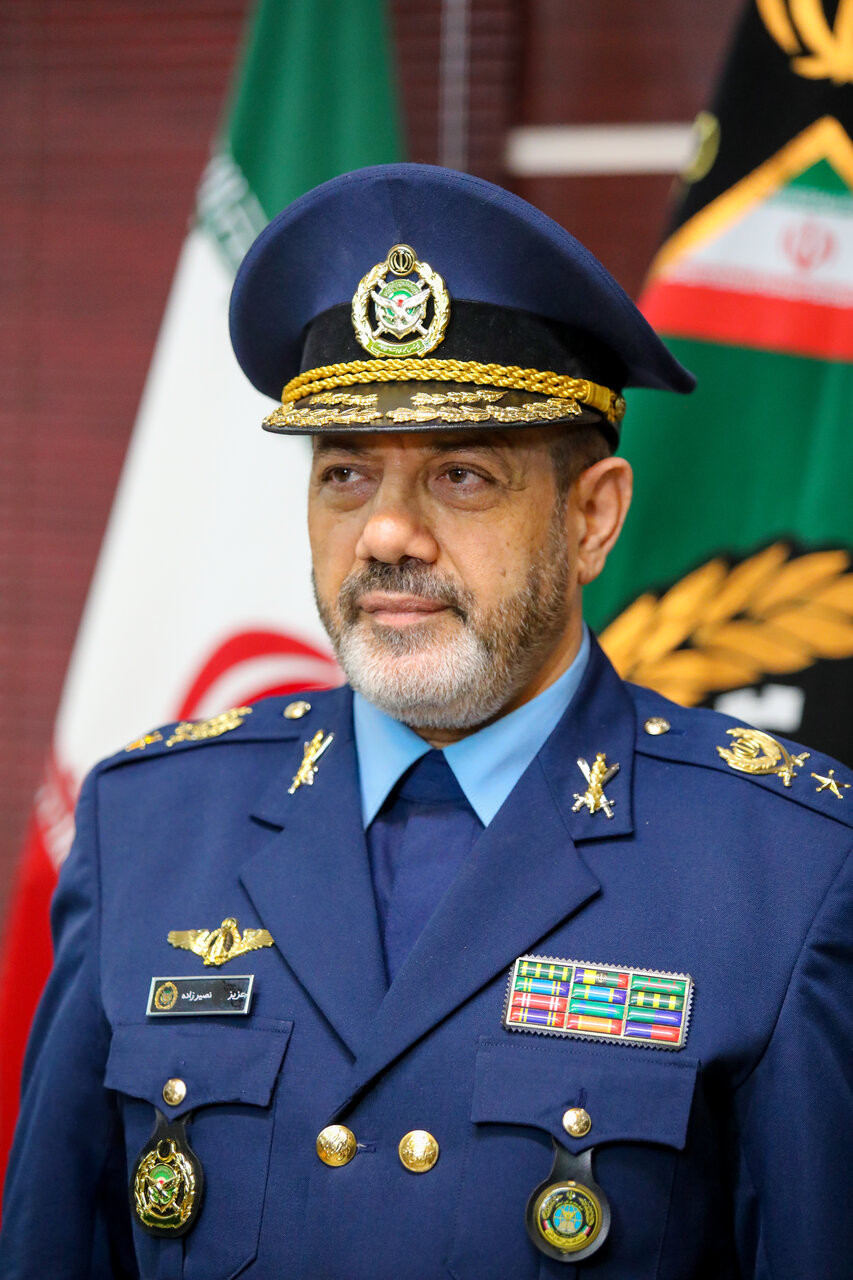
- Nasirzadeh in 2024

Minister of Defence and Armed Forces Logistics
- In office 21 August 2024 – 28 February 2026
- President: Masoud Pezeshkian
- Supreme Leader: Ali Khamenei
- Preceded by: Mohammad-Reza Gharaei Ashtiani
- Succeeded by: Majid Ibn Reza (acting)

Deputy Chief of the General Staff of the Iranian Armed Forces
- In office 19 September 2021 – 21 August 2024
- President: Ebrahim Raisi; Mohammad Mokhber (acting); Masoud Pezeshkian
- Supreme Leader: Ali Khamenei
- Preceded by: Mohammad-Reza Gharaei Ashtiani
- Succeeded by: Mohammad-Reza Gharaei Ashtiani

Commander of the Iranian Air Force
- In office 19 August 2018 – 19 September 2021
- President: Hassan Rouhani; Ebrahim Raisi
- Supreme Leader: Ali Khamenei
- Preceded by: Hassan Shahsafi
- Succeeded by: Hamid Vahedi

Deputy Commander of the Iranian Air Force
- In office 2017–2018
- President: Hassan Rouhani
- Supreme Leader: Ali Khamenei
- Preceded by: Alireza Barkhor
- Succeeded by: Hamid Vahedi

Deputy Coordinator of the Iranian Air Force
- In office 2009–2017
- President: Mahmoud Ahmadinejad; Hassan Rouhani
- Supreme Leader: Ali Khamenei
- Preceded by: Abolqasem Ebrahimdoost
- Succeeded by: Mohammad Qarabaghi

Personal details
- Born: 25 May 1964 Sarab, East Azerbaijan, Pahlavi Iran
- Died: 28 February 2026 (aged 61) Tehran, Iran
- Cause of death: Airstrike
- Resting place: Behesht-e Zahra

Military service
- Allegiance: Iran
- Branch/service: Islamic Republic of Iran Air Force
- Years of service: 1982–2026
- Rank: Brigadier General; Major General (posthumous)
- Battles/wars: Iran–Iraq War; Syrian civil war; Iranian intervention in Syria; War in Iraq (2013–2017); Iranian intervention in Iraq; Iran–PJAK conflict; Western Iran clashes; Iran–Israel conflict; 2024 Iran–Israel conflict; Twelve-Day War; 2026 Iran war X

Aziz Nasirzadeh (Persian: عزیز نصیرزاده; 25 May 1964 – 28 February 2026) was an Iranian military officer who served as the Minister of Defence of Iran from 2024 to 2026. He previously served as the Deputy of Chief of Staff for the Iranian Armed Forces from September 2021 to August 2024, and was the commander of the Iranian Air Force (IRIAF) from August 2018 to September 2021, prior to that position. A veteran of the Iran–Iraq War, he graduated as a certified F-14 pilot, but never saw any combat. On 28 February 2026, the Israel Defense Forces announced that he had been killed during the 2026 Iran war.

== Biography ==
Aziz Nasirzadeh was born in the year 1964 in the city of Sarab and completed his Secondary education in Tehran. Nasirzadeh began his military career in 1982 and after graduating from the Air Force Academy and completing training courses in Iran and Pakistan, he joined a tactical squadron as an F-14 Tomcat pilot During the Iran–Iraq War, Over the years, he served in key positions in the Islamic Republic of Iran Air Force, such as chief of staff and acting commander before his appointment as full commander in 2018 to 2021.

From September 2021 to 2024, Nasirzadeh was Deputy Chief of Staff of the Armed Forces of the Islamic Republic of Iran, a position that reflected significant strategic responsibility across Iran's entire military establishment. In August 2024, he was appointed the Iranian Minister of Defense.

After becoming defence minister in August 2024, Nasirzadeh made a number of public statements on Iran's military posture amid rising tensions with the United States and Israel. In May 2025, he said that Iran would target U.S. and Israeli interests, bases and forces if either country attacked Iran, adding that U.S. bases in the region would also be considered targets. Ahead of the sixth round of Iran–United States nuclear talks in June 2025, he said that if the negotiations failed and military conflict was imposed on Iran, U.S. bases across the region would be within Iran's reach. During the same press briefing, he also said that Iran had recently tested a missile with a two-ton warhead and would not accept limitations on its missile programme.

Nasirzadeh was involved in national-level security planning, including chairing Iran's National Organization for Passive Defense, responsible for safeguarding Iran's critical civilian, military, and nuclear infrastructure from potential U.S. or Israeli strikes. His international security engagements included defense cooperation with Armenia and joint military exercises with Azerbaijan, aimed at countering Israeli, Turkish, and Western influence in the South Caucasus.

Following June 2025 Israeli strikes on Iran, several opposition and foreign media outlets claimed that Nasirzadeh had been killed in the attacks targeting the Iranian Ministry of Defence headquarters in Tehran. However, pro-government journalist Dara Nassari said that "Amir Nasirzadeh is in full health and continues to serve the honorable people of Iran."

== Death ==
Nasirzadeh was killed during the 2026 Iran war, on 28 February 2026, by the Israel Defense Forces. The Iranian government reported his death in official news websites and television channels on IRIB.

== See also ==
- 2026 Iran war
- List of Iranian officials killed during the 2026 Iran war
- Ebrahim Zolfaghari

Political offices
Preceded by Mohammad-Reza Gharaei Ashtiani	Minister of Defence and Armed Forces Logistics; 21 August 2024 – 28 February 2026	Succeeded by Majid Ebn-e-Reza
Military offices
Preceded by Mohammad-Reza Gharaei Ashtiani	Deputy Chief of the General Staff of the Armed Forces; 19 September 2021–28 August 2024	Succeeded by Mohammad-Reza Gharaei Ashtiani
Preceded by Hassan Shahsafi	Commander of the Islamic Republic of Iran Army Air Force; 19 August 2018 – 19 September 2021	Succeeded by Hamid Vahedi
Preceded by Alireza Barkhor	Deputy Commander of the Islamic Republic of Iran Army Air Force; 2017 – 2018	Succeeded by Hamid Vahedi
Preceded by Abolqasem Ebrahimdoost	Deputy Coordinator of the Islamic Republic of Iran Army Air Force; 2009 – 2017	Succeeded by Mohammad Qarabaghi
