= Islamic Republican (newspaper) =

Iranian newspaper

- The 18 June 2009 front page of Jomhouri-e Eslami
- Type: Daily newspaper
- Owner: Islamic Republican Party (1979–1987)
- Publisher: Jomhouri-e Eslami Newspaper
- Founded: 30 May 1979; 47 years ago
- Political alignment: Conservatism (Iranian)
- Language: Persian
- Headquarters: Tehran, Iran
- Website: www.jepress.ir

Jomhouri-e Eslami (Persian: جمهوری اسلامی) is an official Iranian newspaper, which started its work on 30 May 1979, as the newspaper of Islamic Republic Party. In the beginning it was under the grantee of Islamic Republic Party and its managing director was Ali Khamenei. Mir-Hossein Mousavi was its editor-in-chief.

Even after the closure of Islamic Republic Party, the Jomhouri-e Eslami newspaper continued its work. The paper is one of the state-sponsored publications together with Ettela'at and Kayhan of which publishers are directly appointed by the Supreme Leader. As of 2013 the paper was described as "reputedly close to" Ali Akbar Hashemi-Rafsanjani.

Islamic Republican has a daily circulation of over 100,000 copies and is considered to be one of the most influential newspapers in Iran. The newspaper has been the subject of controversy over the years, with some critics accusing it of promoting the Iranian government's propaganda and censoring dissenting views.

== See also ==
- List of newspapers in Iran
