= Commander-in-Chief of the Iranian Armed Forces =

Ultimate authority of the Iranian military

Commander-in-Chief of the Armed Forces of the Islamic Republic of Iran
- فرمانده کل نیروهای مسلح جمهوری اسلامی ایران (Persian)
- Emblem of Iran

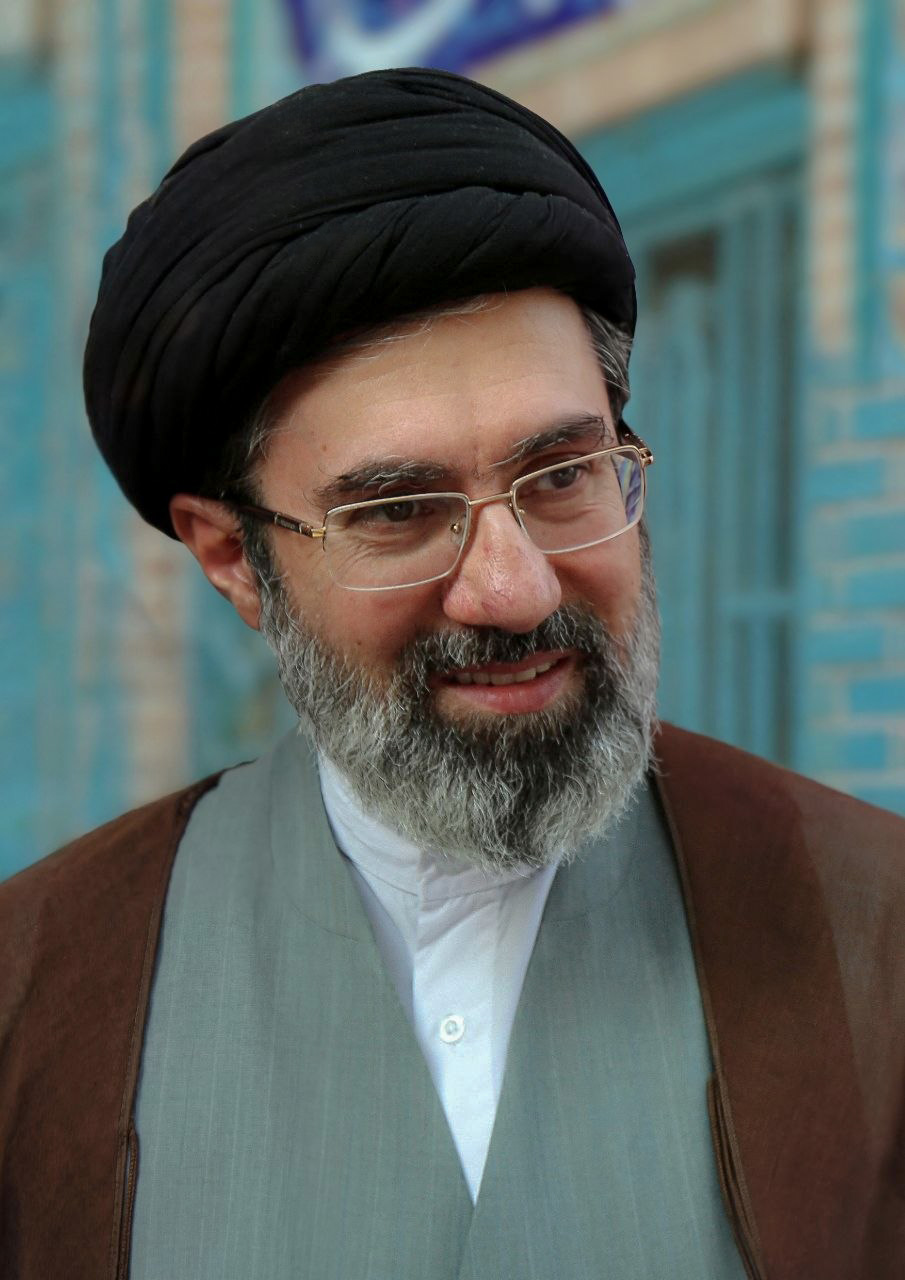
- Incumbent; Mojtaba Khamenei since 8 March 2026
- Islamic Republic of Iran Armed Forces
- Seat: Tehran, Iran
- Appointer: Assembly of Experts
- Constituting instrument: Persian Constitution of 1906
- Formation: 6 August 1906; 120 years ago
- First holder: Mozaffar ad-Din Shah

The position of Commander-in-Chief (Persian: فرمانده کل قوا, romanized: Farmândeh-ye Kol-e Qova), formerly known as Bozorg Arteshtârân (Persian: بزرگ ارتشتاران, lit. 'Great Army Leader'), is the ultimate authority of all the Islamic Republic of Iran Armed Forces, and the highest possible military position within the Islamic Republic of Iran. The position was established during the Persian Constitutional Revolution. According to the Constitution of Iran, the position is vested in the Supreme Leader of Iran and is held since 1981.

== Islamic Republic of Iran ==
After the 1979 Iranian Revolution and 15 days after the inauguration of the first president Abolhassan Banisadr in February 1980, Ayatollah Ruhollah Khomeini delegated him as the Commander-in-Chief. According to Akbar Hashemi Rafsanjani, this was due to the illness of Ayatollah Khomeini and his concerns about the future of the revolution (in his absence). In the decree from Khomeini to Banisadr it is mentioned:

At this critical stage where the need to concentrate forces is greater than any stage, you are appointed as my representative to the position of the Commander-in-Chief of the Armed Forces in the manner determined by the Constitution of the Islamic Republic of Iran.

Following the impeachment of Banisadr in June 1981, the title of Commander-in-Chief was not transferred to the next president Mohammad-Ali Rajai, and is kept to this day by the Supreme Leader of the Islamic Republic of Iran.

== List of commanders-in-chief ==
No.	Portrait	Name (Birth–Death)	Term of office			Military rank	Military branch
No.	Portrait	Name (Birth–Death)	Took office	Left office	Time in office	Military rank	Military branch
(Qajar Iran) • Sublime State of Persia (1906–1925) •
1	Mozaffar ad-Din Shah	Shah; Mozaffar ad-Din Shah (1853–1907)	6 August 1906	3 January 1907 #	150 days	N/A	N/A
2	Mohammad Ali Shah	Shah; Mohammad Ali Shah (1872–1925)	3 January 1907	16 July 1909	2 years, 194 days	N/A	N/A
–	Ali Reza Khan	Regent; Ali Reza Khan (1847–1910)	16 July 1909	22 September 1910 #	1 year, 56 days	N/A	N/A
–	Abolqasem Khan	Regent; Abolqasem Khan (1856–1927)	22 September 1910	21 July 1914	3 years, 314 days	N/A	N/A
3	Ahmad Shah	Shah; Ahmad Shah (1898–1930)	21 July 1914	14 February 1925	11 years, 147 days	N/A	N/A
4	Reza Khan	Prime Minister; Reza Khan (1878–1944) (Note: Appointed by the Parliament of Iran.)	14 February 1925	15 December 1925	304 days	Brigadier general	Persian Cossack Brigade (1894–1921)
(Pahlavi Iran) • Imperial State of Iran (1925–1979) •
1	Reza Shah	Shah; Reza Shah (1878–1944)	15 December 1925	16 September 1941	15 years, 275 days	Brigadier general	Persian Cossack Brigade (1894–1921)
2	Mohammad Reza Shah	Shah; Mohammad Reza Shah (1919–1980)	16 September 1941	21 July 1952	10 years, 309 days	Captain	Imperial Iranian Army (1936–1941)
3	Mohammad Mosaddegh	Prime Minister; Mohammad Mosaddegh (1882–1967) (Note: Mosaddegh was granted emergency powers by Shah of Iran to rule by decree. While holding office as the Prime Minister and Minister of War (renamed to "Ministry of National Defence") simultaneously, Mossadegh went over the authority of Shah, the Commander-in-Chief vetted in the Persian Constitution of 1906, and appointed commanders in Imperial Iranian Army and Police.)	21 July 1952	19 August 1953	1 year, 29 days	N/A	N/A
(2)	Mohammad Reza Shah	Shah; Mohammad Reza Shah (1919–1980)	19 August 1953	11 February 1979	25 years, 176 days	Captain	Imperial Iranian Army (1936–1941)
• Islamic Republic of Iran (1979–present) •
1	Abolhassan Banisadr	President; Abolhassan Banisadr (1933–2021) (Note: Delegated by the Supreme Leader of Iran.)	19 February 1980	10 June 1981	1 year, 111 days	N/A	N/A
2	Ruhollah Khomeini	Supreme Leader; Ruhollah Khomeini (1902–1989) (Note: Akbar Hashemi Rafsanjani acted as the de facto commander-in-chief since mid-1980s, and was later officially appointed as the deputy commander-in-chief on 2 June 1988. Hassan Rouhani served as deputy to second-in-command since 1988.)	10 June 1981	3 June 1989 #	7 years, 358 days	N/A	N/A
3	Ali Khamenei	Supreme Leader; Ali Khamenei (1939–2026) (Note: Acting: 4 June – 6 August 1989)	4 June 1989	28 February 2026 X	36 years, 269 days	N/A (Note: He was caretaker of the Islamic Revolutionary Guard Corps, the highest position in the corps. At the time military ranks were not used.)	Islamic Revolutionary Guard Corps (24 November 1979–24 February 1980)
–	Interim Leadership Council	Interim Leadership Council (Note: Members: Masoud Pezeshkian, Gholam-Hossein Mohseni-Eje'i and Alireza Arafi.)	5 March 2026	8 March 2026	3 days	N/A	N/A (Mohseni-Eje'i and Arafi); Islamic Revolutionary Guard Corps (Pezeshkian)
4	Mojtaba Khamenei	Supreme Leader; Mojtaba Khamenei (born 1969)	8 March 2026	Incumbent	231 days	N/A	Islamic Revolutionary Guard Corps (1987–1988, 2009–2026)

== List of deputy commanders-in-chief ==
No.	Portrait	Name (Birth–Death)	Term of office			Military rank	Military branch
No.	Portrait	Name (Birth–Death)	Took office	Left office	Time in office	Military rank	Military branch
• Islamic Republic of Iran (1979–present) •
–	Valiollah Fallahi	Brigadier General; Valiollah Fallahi (1931–1981)	11 June 1981	29 September 1981 †	110 days	Brigadier General	Army
–	Qasem-Ali Zahirnejad	Brigadier General; Qasem-Ali Zahirnejad (1924–1999)	1 October 1981	?	N/A	Brigadier General	Army
1	Akbar Hashemi Rafsanjani	Akbar Hashemi Rafsanjani (1934–2017)	2 June 1988	20 August 1988	79 days	N/A	N/A

== See also ==
- Islamic Republic of Iran Armed Forces
  - General Staff of the Islamic Republic of Iran Armed Forces
- Islamic Republic of Iran Army
  - List of Chiefs of Staff of the Islamic Republic of Iran Army
  - Joint Staff of the Islamic Republic of Iran Army
- Islamic Revolutionary Guard Corps
  - List of commanders of the Islamic Revolutionary Guard Corps
  - Islamic Revolutionary Guard Corps Joint Staff
