= Structure of the Iranian Army =

Organization of the Iranian Army

The following article lists four Orders of Battle for the Iranian Army at different periods. Note, that this is not the order of battle of the Iranian Revolutionary Guard Corps but of the regular ground forces (Artesh).

== Army Order of Battle (Localities) ==
| First Army Headquarters | Tehran |
| Second Army Headquarters | Esfahan |
| Third Army Headquarters | Shiraz |
| 28th Mechanized Division | Kerman |
| 35th Mechanized Division | Khorramabad |
| 84th Mechanized Division | Shiraz |
| 2nd Armoured Division | Dezful |
| 16th Armoured Division | Qazvin, Qasr-e Shirin region |
| 18th Armoured Division | Tehran |
| 81st Armored Division | Kermanshah |
| 88th Armoured Division | Ahvaz |
| 92nd Armoured Division | Khuzestan |
| 30th Infantry Division | Tehran |
| 40th Infantry Division | Hamadan |
| 21st Infantry Division | Azerbaijan |
| 64th Infantry Division | Urumia |
| 77th Infantry Division | Khorasan |
| 1st Marine Brigade | Bandar Abbas |
| 79th Infantry Division | Tabriz |
| 84th Infantry Division | Lorestan |
| 23rd Special Forces Division | Tehran |
| 55th Parachute Division | Shiraz |
| 351st SSM Brigade | Tehran |
| 75th Logistics Brigade | |
| 22nd Artillery Division | |
| 23rd Artillery Division | |
| 44th Artillery Division | Esfahan |
| 55th Artillery Division | Esfahan |

== Army Order of Battle, c. 1998 ==
| Southern Operations Sector (Dezful) | Northern Operations Sector (Rezaiyeh) | Western Operations Sector (Kermanshah) |
| 81st/92nd? Armored Division | 28th Mechanized Infantry Division | 16th/18th? Armored Division |
| 45th Commando Brigade | 64th Infantry Division | 81st Armored Division |
| | 40th Infantry Brigade | 84th Mechanized Infantry Division |
| | 25th Commando Brigade | 23rd Commando Division |
| | 11th Artillery Division | 35th Commando Brigade |
| | | 58th Commando Brigade |
| | | 22nd Artillery Division |
| | | 23rd Artillery Division |
| | | 44th Artillery Division |
| | | 55th Artillery Division |
| | | 411th Engineer Division |
| Eastern Operations Sector (Birjand) | Airmobile Forces Group | |
| 88th Armored Division | 29th Commando Division (Airmobile) | |
| 30th Infantry Division | 55th Airborne Division | |
77th Infantry Division
Sources: Bomba, Ty "Back to Iraq: Speculations on Gulf War II" (Issue 50, 1998).; Liebl, Vern "The Iranian Armed Forces Today. (Issue 41, 1998).

== Imperial Army Order of Battle, c. 1970s ==
| 16th Armored Division | Ghazvin | |
| 81st Armored Division | Kermanshah | |
| 92nd Armored Division | Khuzestan | |
| 88th Armored Division | Sistan | |
| 1st Infantry Imperial Guard Division | E. Azarbaijan | (21st Infantry Div. after the Revolution) |
| 2nd Imperial Guard Division | E. Azarbaijan | (21st Infantry Div. after the Revolution) |
| 28th Infantry Division | Kurdestan | |
| 30th Infantry Division | Golestan | |
| 64th Infantry Division (Iran) | W. Azerbaijan | |
| 77th Infantry Division | Khorasan | |
| 84th Infantry Division | Lorestan | |
| 55th Airborne Brigade | Fars | (Division during the war with Iraq) |
| 65th Airborne Brigade | Tehran | (Division during the war with Iraq) |
| 23rd Airborne Brigade (NOHED) | Tehran | (Division during the war with Iraq) |
| 37th Armored Brigade | Fars | |
| 11th Artillery Group | E.Azarbaijan | |
22nd Artillery Group
| 33rd Artillery Group | Tehran | |
44th Artillery Group
55th Artillery Group
99th Air Defence Group
4 Hawk missiles Battalions
Source: Imperial Iranian Ground Forces at Sarbazan

== Divisions of the Ground Forces, 1941 ==
Source: https://fa.wikipedia.org/wiki/نیروی_زمینی_شاهنشاهی_ایران The divisions of the Ground Forces at the time of the Allied invasion of 1941 were as follows:

- Central 1st Division: Includes 4 infantry regiments, 3 cavalry regiments, 2 mountain artillery regiments, and several engineering battalions. The talent of 13,000 people.
- 2nd Central Division: includes 3 infantry regiments, 3 cavalry regiments, 2 artillery regiments, and several engineering battalions. Talent: 12,000.
- Tehran Independent Mechanized Brigade. Includes a light tank battalion with a capacity of 50 tanks. A medium tank battalion with a capacity of 50 tanks.
- 3rd Northeast Division: Includes 3 infantry regiments, 2 cavalry regiments, 1 artillery regiment, and 1 air regiment. Talent: 9,500 people.
- 4th Northwest Division: 1 infantry regiment, 2 cavalry regiment, 1 artillery regiment. Talent 4500.
- 5th Kurdistan Division: includes 3 infantry regiments, 1 cavalry regiment. 5,000 people
- 6th Division of Khuzestan: includes 3 infantry regiments, 1 cavalry regiment, 1 artillery regiment, and 1 air regiment. 8,000 people.
- 7th Fars Division: including 3 infantry regiments, 1 mixed artillery regiment, and 1 cavalry regiment. The talent of 5,000 people.
- 8th Division of Kerman: includes 1 infantry regiment, 1 cavalry regiment, and 1 mixed artillery regiment. The talent of 4,500 people.
- 9th Khorasan Division: Includes 2 infantry regiments, 2 cavalry regiments, 1 mixed artillery regiment, and 1 air regiment. Talent: 6,000 people.
- 10th Gorgan Division: Includes 1 infantry regiment, 1 cavalry regiment, and 1 artillery regiment. The talent of 4,500 people.
- The 11th Division of Gilan: It includes 3 infantry regiments. Totalled 4,000 people.
- 12th Division of Kermanshah: 1 infantry regiment, 1 cavalry regiment, 1 field artillery regiment, 1 mixed mountain regiment. Totalled 4,000 people.
- Isfahan 13th Division: Commanded by Fazlollah Zahedi. Includes 1 infantry regiment, 1 cavalry regiment, and 1 artillery regiment. The talent of 4,000 people.
- The 14th Makran Division: Includes 2 infantry regiments, 1 cavalry regiment, 1 artillery regiment, and 1 Jammaz (camel) battalion. The talent of 4,000 people. Former Makran Brigade
- 15th Division of Ardabil: 2 infantry regiments, 1 cavalry regiment. The talent of 4,000 people.
- 16th Lorestan Division: 1 infantry regiment, 1 cavalry regiment, 1 artillery battalion. The talent of 4,000 people.
- 17th Khoy Division: 1 infantry regiment, 1 cavalry regiment. The talent of 3,000 people.
- 18th Torbat-e-Jam Division: 3 infantry regiments. The talent of 4,000 people.

Total: 94,000 soldiers.
