= Training Center 05 Kerman =

Military Training Center

The Shahid Ashraf Ganjouei Training Center 05 Kerman (Persian: مرکز آموزشی ۰۵ شهید اشرف گنجویی کرمان) known as Training Center 05 Kerman or 05 Kerman is one of the most important military training centers of the Islamic Republic of Iran Army Ground Forces. It is located in the Kerman, Iran. This center accepts soldiers with educational backgrounds ranging from below high school to PhD levels. Center 05 Kerman is considered one of the oldest military units in the Iranian Army. Initially, it was not a training unit but a combat unit, and it was later converted into a training center.

Official logo

This center operates under the motto Faith, Discipline, Training. It was established in 1933 by the Imperialism Iranian Army and is currently managed under the supervision of the Islamic Republic of Iran Army. The center plays a vital role in the education and development of soldiers and has consistently worked to enhance combat readiness and organizational discipline. The current commander of the center is Second brigadier general Mansour Rahmani.

== History ==
In 1933, representatives from the Engineering Department of the Imperialism Iranian Army Ground Forces were sent to Kerman to establish a military garrison. They purchased a suitable location in the village area of Saraasiab Farsangi, which included a large garden called "Shatergaloo" and vast surrounding lands. In 1934, a unit named the Mounted Cavalry was established and stationed at the garrison. In 1945, the unit was renamed the 7th Kerman-Makran Infantry Division. Then in 1954, it was renamed again to the 11th Kerman Infantry Division and continued under that title until 1962, when the 11th Division was relocated to Khorasan. In its place, an independent brigade was formed in Kerman, which operated until 1965. In 1965, the unit was renamed Training Center 305 Kerman, and in 1968, it became known as Training Center 05 Kerman. In 2009, the center was renamed after Martyr Major General Alireza Ashraf Ganjouei.

== Role in the Iran–Iraq War ==
In March 1981, Combat Battalion 808 was formed with full equipment. On April 15, 1981, the unit, including 67 permanent personnel, 14 conscript officers, and 700 soldiers under the command of Colonel Aghebati, was deployed to the frontlines. They were stationed at the Dokuhe Barracks in Andimeshk and began combat operations in the Tappeh Sabz area under the Major general of the 21st Division, led at the time by then-Colonel Hossein Hassani Sa'di. In total, 57 personnel from this center were killed during the war.

During the Iran–Iraq War, Training Center 05 Kerman trained over 190,000 soldiers and dispatched them to the frontlines, making it one of the most active centers for basic combat training.

== Controversies ==
=== Strictness ===
Although this center is known as one of the toughest places to undergo military training, some conscripts describe it as a nightmare. In a 2014 interview, former commander Colonel Saeed Askari responded to these views: "Keep in mind, a center known for strictness for 30 to 40 years can't change its reputation overnight. It takes time. We are now using every resource we have to ensure that, along with military training, soldiers become stronger both physically and mentally and learn valuable life lessons. When a soldier leaves here, he no longer holds a negative view; rather, he believes that during his two years of service, he fulfilled his duty to his country and learned how to stand on his own feet."

=== COVID-19 ===
In 2020, during the COVID-19 pandemic, Commander Colonel Mansour Rahmani stated: "We implemented preventative measures including temperature checks, hand sanitizing before entry, distribution of hygiene kits, and counseling sessions. Living quarters are disinfected daily, and any suspected cases of COVID-19 are quarantined in a recovery center. If necessary, they are transferred to Imam Hossein Army Hospital."

== Facilities ==
One of the key features of this center is its literacy program. Since 1982, more than 8,000 undereducated or illiterate young men have received education at the Soldier School of the garrison.

Other facilities include a cultural store, juice and ice cream stand, sandwich shop, and Cooperative Store 808.

== Personnel ==
- Battalion 051 Fajr consists of soldiers with educational levels below high school diploma, high school diploma, and associate degree.
- Battalion 052 Fath is composed of Companies 21, 22, 23, and 24, and includes soldiers holding below high school diploma, high school diploma, and associate degree.
- Battalion 053 Nasr includes Companies 31, 32, 33, and 34, and its soldiers also hold below high school diploma, high school diploma, and associate degree.
- The Fifth Battalion is likewise made up of personnel with educational levels below high school diploma, high school diploma, and associate degree.
- Battalion 054 Zafar consists of Companies 41 and 42, and its soldiers hold bachelor's, master's, and doctoral degrees.
- Battalion 056 Kheibar is composed of Companies 61, 62, 63, and 64, and its soldiers hold bachelor's, master's, and doctoral degrees.
