= Nasser Mohammadifar =

Iranian brigadier general (1945–2026)

Amir Nasser Mohammadifar
- ناصر محمدی‌فر
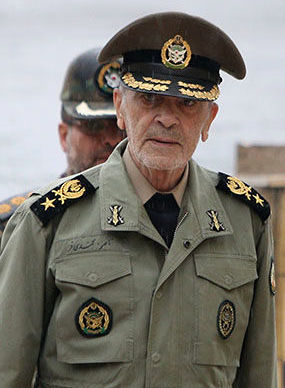
- Mohammadifar in 2018
- Born: 30 May 1945; Mian Rudan, Pahlavi Iran
- Died: 22 February 2026 (aged 80); Tehran, Iran
- Military career
- Allegiance: Pahlavi Iran (1967–1979); Iran (1979–2026)
- Branch: Ground Force
- Service years: 1967–2026
- Rank: Brigadier General
- Commands: Iranian Army Ground Forces (2001–2005); Deputy Coordinating Deputy of the Joint Staff of the Army (1992–1998); Deputy Coordinating Deputy of the Iranian Army Ground Forces (1991–1992); South-West Regional Headquarters (1991–?); 81st Armoured Division; 16th Armoured Division; 88th Armored Division; 35th Ranger Brigade; 2nd Brigade of the 88th Armored Division; 234th Armored Battalion; 88th Armored Division (As Operations Officer) column from the 234th Armored Battalion platoon commander in the 237th Tank Battalion of the 37th Armored Brigade of Shiraz
- Conflicts: 1979 Kurdish rebellion in Iran; Iran–Iraq War; KDPI insurgency (1989–1996); War in Afghanistan (2001–2021); 2001 uprising in Herat; Insurgency in Sistan and Balochistan

Nasser Mohammadifar (Persian: ناصر محمدی‌فر; 30 May 1945 – 22 February 2026) was a brigadier general of the Islamic Republic of Iran Army who served as the Supreme Military Advisor to the Commander-in-Chief of the Armed Forces of Iran and Supreme Leader, Ali Khamenei. He was the 14th Commander-in-Chief of the Iranian Army Ground Forces from 7 February 2001 to 26 September 2005.

Mohammadifar began his military career in the Imperial Iranian Ground Forces in 1967. During the Iran–Iraq War, he commanded the 2nd Brigade of the 88th Armoured Division, the 35th Ranger Brigade, the 16th Armoured Division of Qazvin, the 81st Armored Division of Kermanshah, and the Southern Headquarters.

== Biography ==
Nasser Mohammadifar was born on 30 May 1945 in the village of Mian Rudan, Khalkhal County. He entered the military academy in 1967 and after completing his undergraduate and preparatory armor courses in Shiraz in 1972, he worked as a platoon commander in the 237th Tank Battalion of the 37th Armored Brigade of Shiraz.

After the revolution and the fall of the imperial regime, Mohammadifar voluntarily went to the region as the commander of a column dispatched from the 234th Armored Battalion during the conflict with regional separatist groups in Kurdistan and played an active role in the taking of the Baneh garrison.

During the Iran–Iraq War, Nasser Mohammadifar commanded the 16th and 81st Armored Divisions of the Army Ground Forces. During the war, Mohammadifar commanded the 234th Armored Battalion, the 2nd Brigade of the 88th Armoured Division, the successor to the 88th Division, and the 16th Division. He was the commander of the 81st Armored Division and was appointed as the operations officer of the 88th Armored Division of Sistan and Baluchestan in the Sarpol-e Zahab and Qasr-e-Shirin operational areas. At the same time as he assumed command of the 2nd Brigade of this division in the Somar and West general area, the then commander of the Ground Forces (Amir Maj. Gen. Hossein Hassani Sa'di) informed him of the responsibility of forming and commanding the 35th Ranger Brigade in the Somar area, and Brigadier General Mohammadifar proceeded to form the 35th Ranger Brigade. After that, he assumed command of the 16th Armoured Division in the Mehran and Salehabad areas. He was also responsible for commanding the 81st Armored Division of Kermanshah in the Qasr-e Shirin operational area, the successor to the southern operational headquarters, and later the commander of this headquarters.

After the war, he commanded the southern headquarters of Nezaja, served as the deputy coordinator of Nezaja, advisor to the commander-in-chief of the army, and the commander-in-chief of Nezaja. He was the Commander-in-Chief of the from 2001 to 2005. He was the supreme advisor to the Supreme Leader of Iran on military affairs.

Mohammadifar died on 22 February 2026, at the age of 80.

== Awards ==
Mohammadifar held the Order of Victory. In 2001, he also received the Order of Dedication from the Supreme Leader of the Islamic Republic of Iran. The book "Il, Artesh, Iran" by Mohsen Sadeghnia has been published on the subject of his life.

Military offices
Preceded by Abdolali Pourshasb	Commander of Islamic Republic of Iran Army's Ground Forces; 7 February 2001–26 September 2005	Succeeded by Mohammad-Hossein Dadras
