= Mohammad Amin Beglari =

Iranian military official (1918–1979)

Timsar Mohammad Amin Begleri
- محمدامین بیگلری
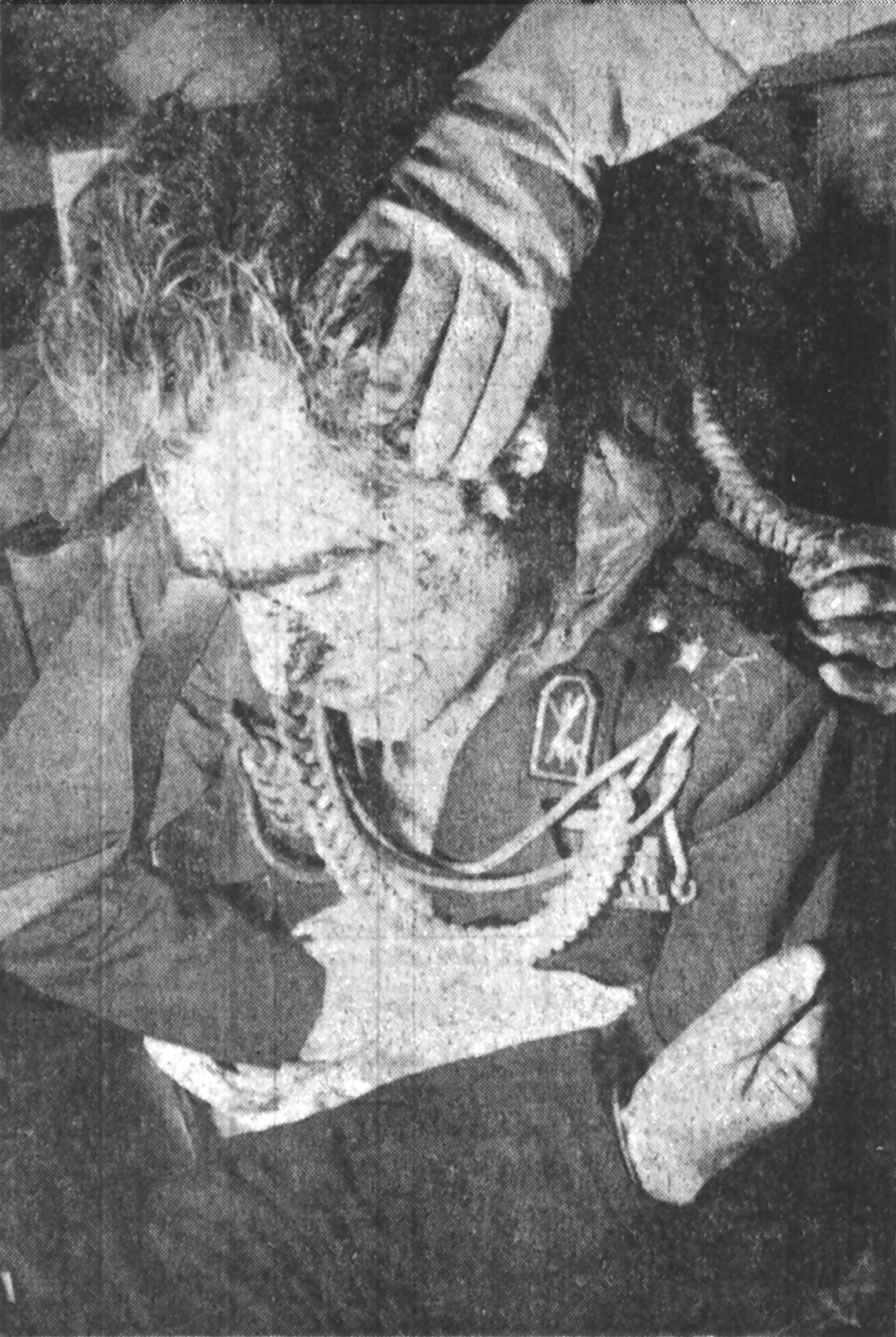
- Born: August 12, 1918; Saqqez, Kurdistan province, Qajar Iran
- Died: February 11, 1979 (aged 60); Tehran, Iran
- Military career
- Allegiance: Pahlavi Iran
- Branch: Imperial Iranian Army
- Service years: 1938–1979
- Rank: Major general
- Commands: deputy commander of the Imperial Guard
- Conflicts: World War II; Anglo-Soviet invasion of Iran; Iran crisis of 1946

Mohammad Amin Beglari (Persian: محمدامین بیگلری; 12 August 1918 – 11 February 1979) was the deputy commander of the Imperial Guard of Mohammed Reza Shah a few months before the collapse of the regime.

He was of Kurdish origin, a deputy commander and loyal to Mohammed Reza Shah. He took part as a guerilla fighter against the Soviet invasion as well as the Mahabad Republic from 1945 to 1947. He was assassinated shortly after General Abdol Ali Badrei in 1979.

"A third high officer, Gen. Mohammed Amin Beglari, deputy commander of the Imperial Guards, was found dead in his home here today with three bullet wounds in his body."

Some other sources claim that he committed suicide when revolutionary guards stopped his car .
