= Neshat (name) =

Neshat (Persian: نشاط) is a surname which is also used as a feminine given name. It was derived from Arabic and means joyful in Persian. Notable people with the name are as follows:

== Surname ==
- Ali Neshat (1923–1979), army general in the Imperial Iran
- Shirin Neshat (born 1957), Iranian visual artist

== Given name ==
- Neshat Jahandari (born 1989), Iranian pilot
