= Ahmad Dadbin =

Iranian general

Amir Ahmad Dadbin
- احمد دادبین
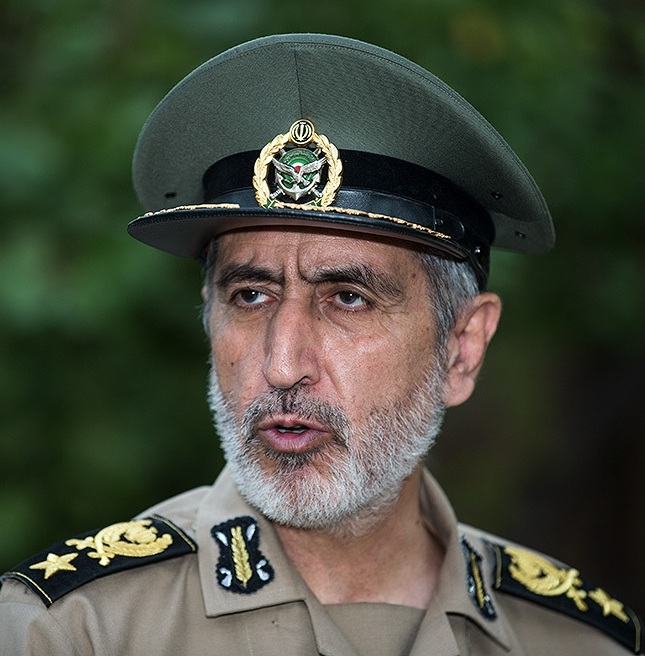
- Dadbin in 2017
- Born: 1955 (age 70–71); Shiraz, Pahlavi Iran
- Military career
- Allegiance: Pahlavi Iran (1974–1979); Iran (1979–2005)
- Branch: Ground Forces
- Service years: 1974–2005
- Rank: Brigadier General
- Commands: Iranian Army Ground Forces (1994–1997); 28th Infantry Division of Kordestan
- Conflicts: Iran–Iraq War

Ahmad Dadbin (Persian: احمد دادبین; born 1955) is a Brigadier General of the Islamic Republic of Iran Army, currently serving as an advisor to the Commander-in-Chief of the Army. He was the Commander-in-Chief of the Iranian Army Ground Forces from 1994 to 1997.

== Biography ==
Ahmad Dadbin was born in 1955 in Shiraz. His father was an officer in the Imperial Iranian Army. He entered the Army Officers' Academy in 1974 and officially joined the Imperial Iranian Army. In 1977, he completed his infantry training at the Shiraz Infantry Center and the following year joined the 23rd Nohed Division (Army Special Forces) as a second lieutenant. Years later, he assumed command of the 28th Infantry Division of Kordestan and was appointed Commander-in-Chief of the Iranian Army Ground Forces in 1994.

After that, he took over the management of the Iranian Helicopter Support and Modernization Company "Penha". In 2005, according to his own account, he fell from Mount Damavand and was seriously injured due to wearing unsuitable shoes. He then went into a coma and recovered a short time later. Among his notable works during his time as commander of the Nazaja were improving the army's budget and economy, as well as the Zolfaqar strategic maneuver "Great Velayat Maneuver" in the deserts of Qom province.

Military offices
| Preceded by Abdollah Najafi | Commander of Islamic Republic of Iran Army's Ground Forces; 25 October 1994–1 October 1997 | Succeeded by Abdolali Pourshasb |
