= Ali Neshat =

Iranian general (1923–1979)

Timsar Ali Neshat
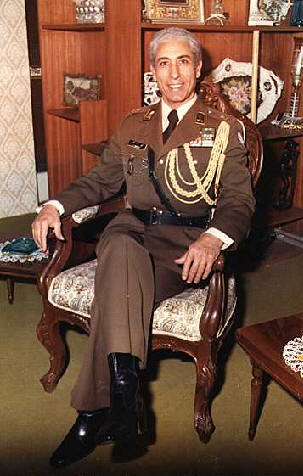
- Native name: علی نشاط
- Born: 1923; Tehran, Qajar Iran
- Died: April 11, 1979 (aged 55–56) Tehran, Iran
- Allegiance: Pahlavi Iran
- Branch: Imperial Iranian Army
- Service years: 1950s–1979
- Rank: Major general
- Commands: Imperial Guard (1979)
- Children: Shirin Neshat

Ali Neshat (Persian: علی نشاط; 1923 – 11 April 1979) was a general of the Imperial Iranian Army and the last commander of the Imperial Guard during the reign of Mohammad Reza Pahlavi. He was one of the sons of Neshat Esfahani (Motamed Doleh). Major General Neshat was a graduate of Nezam High School and Officer University.

Ali Neshat was one of the commanders, who closed the Mehrabad International Airport to Seyyed Ruhollah Khomeini during the events of the Revolution of 1979, when he returned to Iran. had Command in the Armed Forces and the increasing escape of personnel, on the initiative of Abdol Ali Badrei, the then Commander of the Land Forces of the Imperial Army, on the morning of February 1, 1979, in a snowy weather, a limited number of units.

Abbas Gharabaghi During the events of February 13, 1979, he refused the order to use the forces under his command in the Immortal Guard against the revolutionaries under the pretext of a "special mission of the Immortal Guard" to protect the royal buildings and family. He was accused of "betrayal and disobedience to the superior order."

In the radio tape attributed to Neshat, he introduces himself as "the full solidarity of the Eternal Guard with the revolutionaries and obedience to the command of the neutrality of the army." According to his daughter, he is a Muslim and a believer in prophethood. Muhammad and Imamate were Ali ibn Abi Talib. After the victory of the Revolution, General Neshat was convicted of corruption and treason in the courts of the Islamic Revolution and was executed on April 11, 1979, in Qasr Prison. His burial place is in Zahir Al-Dawla Cemetery.
