= Abdollah Najafi =

Iranian general

Amir Abdullah Najafi
- عبدالله نجفی
- Born: 1951 (age 74–75); Hamadan, Pahlavi Iran
- Military career
- Allegiance: Pahlavi Iran (1969–1979); Iran (1979–2004)
- Branch: Ground Forces
- Service years: 1969–2004
- Rank: Brigadier General
- Commands: Chairman of the Commission for Managing Foreign Prisoners of War (1994–2004); Head of the General Office of Information Protection of the General Staff of the Armed Forces (1994–2004); Iranian Army Ground Force (1991–1994); Coordinator Deputy of the Iranian Army Ground Force (1990–1991); Coordinator Deputy of the Joint Staff of the Army (1990); Deputy to the Coordinator Deputy of the Iranian Army Ground Force (1988–1990)
- Conflicts: Iran–Iraq War; KDPI insurgency (1989–1996); Insurgency in Sistan and Balochistan

Abdullah Najafi (Persian: عبدالله نجفی; born 1951) is a Brigadier General of the Islamic Republic of Iran Army, who was the Commander-in-Chief of the Iranian Army Ground Forces from May 8, 1991, to October 25, 1994.

He entered the Army's Ground Forces Officers' Academy in 1969. After the 1979 Revolution, Najafi became a member of the Military Committee and the Office of Military Advisor to Ruhollah Khomeini. He headed the Presidential Military Working Group from 1988 to 1998. Between 1998 and 1991, Najafi served as Deputy Coordinator of the Army's Ground Forces, Deputy Coordinator of the Army's Joint Staff, and Deputy Coordinator of the Army's Ground Forces. In 1991, he was appointed Commander of the Army's Ground Forces, a position he held until 1994. He served as head of the General Office for Information Protection of the General Staff of the Armed Forces of the Islamic Republic of Iran from 1994 to 2004 before being replaced by Hesam Hashemi.

== Biography ==
Abdullah Najafi was born in Hamadan in 1951. He entered the Army High School in 1967 and then the Army Officers' Academy in 1969. After graduating, he was sent to the Isfahan Artillery Training Center to complete the artillery training course. After that, he was transferred to the Third Brigade of Hamedan in 1974 and served as an artillery commander in that unit until 1978.

After the revolution, he became a member of Ruhollah Khomeini's military committee in the army. Then, in 1979, he was transferred to the Officers' University for a short time as a company commander. With the outbreak of the Iran-Iraq War, he was actively present in operational areas on several occasions.

He worked at the Abadan Operational Headquarters, providing reconnaissance and map reading training to the popular forces, Basij, and the Revolutionary Guards. After a few months, he returned to Tehran in 1980 and worked for 7 years in the Presidential Military Working Group. In 1988, he assumed the position of Deputy Coordinator of the Ground Forces of the Islamic Republic of Iran Army, and subsequently served as Deputy Coordinator of the Army Joint Staff and then Deputy Coordinator of the Army Ground Forces.

Najafi was appointed Commander-in-Chief of the Ground Forces of the Islamic Republic of Iran Army on May 8, 1991, and held this position until October 25, 1994. Then, on October 25, 1994, he assumed the position of Director of the General Office for Information Protection of the General Staff of the Armed Forces of the Islamic Republic of Iran, and chairman of the Prisoners of War and Missing Persons Commissions, he held both until November 2004. Najafi retired from the army in December 2004 with the rank of Brigadier General, and after that, he worked for a while in the Social Affairs Department of the Judiciary, then in the Headquarters for Encouraging Good and Preventing Evil.

Military offices
Preceded by Hossein Hassani Sa'di	Commander of Islamic Republic of Iran Army's Ground Forces; 8 May 1991–25 October 1994	Succeeded by Ahmad Dadbin
