= Sadi, Kerman =

Sadi سعدی
- Village
- Location within Iran
- Coordinates: 30°12′32″N 56°43′01″E
- Country: Iran
- Province: Kerman
- County: Kerman
- Bakhsh: Central
- Rural District: Baghin

Population (2006)
  - Total: 1,382
- Time zone: UTC+3:30 (IRST)
  - Summer (DST): UTC+4:30 (IRDT)

Sadi (Persian: سعدی, also Romanized as Sa‘dī; also known as Sa‘dīābād) is a village in Baghin Rural District, in the Central District of Kerman County, Kerman Province, Iran. At the 2006 census, its population was 1,382, in 377 families.

Iranian General Hossein Hassani Sa'di is from here.
