= Gholam Ali Oveissi =

Iranian general (1918–1984)

Timsar Gholam Ali Oveissi
- غلامعلی اویسی
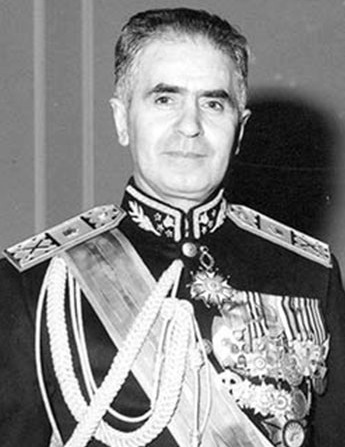
- General Oveissi, c. 1970s

Minister of Labour and Social Affairs
- In office 6 November 1978 – 22 November 1978
- Monarch: Mohammad Reza Pahlavi
- Prime Minister: Gholam Reza Azhari
- Preceded by: Kazem Wadi'i
- Succeeded by: Bagher Katouzian

Commander of the Imperial Iranian Ground Forces
- In office 17 November 1972 – 10 January 1979
- Monarch: Mohammad Reza Pahlavi
- Prime Minister: Amir-Abbas Hoveyda; Jamshid Amouzegar; Jafar Sharif-Emami; Gholam Reza Azhari; Shapour Bakhtiar
- Preceded by: Fathollah Minbashian
- Succeeded by: Abdol Ali Badrei

Commander of the Iranian Gendarmerie
- In office 1969–1972
- Monarch: Mohammad Reza Pahlavi
- Prime Minister: Amir-Abbas Hoveyda
- Preceded by: Mohammad Hossein Zargham
- Succeeded by: Mohammad Moazzi

Director of the Fourth Bureau
- In office 1950–1951
- Monarch: Mohammad Reza Pahlavi
- Prime Minister: Ali Razmara; Khalil Fahimi; Hossein Ala'

Personal details
- Born: 16 April 1918 Fordo, Qom province, Qajar Iran
- Died: 7 February 1984 (aged 65) Paris, France
- Cause of death: Assassination by gunshot
- Party: Iranian Salvation Movement
- Awards: see Medals
- Nickname: Hero of Iran

Military service
- Allegiance: Pahlavi Iran
- Branch/service: Imperial Iranian Ground Forces
- Years of service: 1934–1979
- Rank: General
- Commands: 1st Guard Division (1962–1967); Imperial Guard (1960–1965); Chief of Staff of the Imperial Guard (1955–1958); 3rd Infantry Battalion of the 1st Infantry Division (1954); 16th Regiment of the Kazerun Brigade (1953–1954); 52nd Military Police Regiment (1952–1953); deputy commander of the Military Police (Gendarmerie/Garrison) regiment of the 2nd Division (1941–1943); company commander in the 2nd Division (1940–1943); acting company commander in the 6th Division (1939–40); platoon commander in the 1st Division (1938–1939)
- Battles/wars: 1963 demonstrations in Iran; 1967 Kurdish revolt in Iran

Gholam-Ali Oveissi (Persian: غلامعلی اویسی; 16 April 1918 – 7 February 1984) was an Iranian general and the Chief Commander of the Imperial Iranian Ground Forces under Mohammad Reza Pahlavi. He is regarded as one of the most powerful and adept military generals in Iran's modern history.

== Early life ==
Oveissi's family from his father's lineage goes back to Shah Qara Yusuf Muhammad, the ruler of the Ghara Ghoyonlu dynasty (Black Sheep Turkomans) and descends through Uzun Hasan. He is a direct descendant of Eskandar Beik Torkaman, the minister, head of army (Iraq campaign) and personal advisor to Shah Abbas the Great. On his mother's side he was the grandson of Hossein Ali Mirza, the eldest son of Mohammad Ali Shah Qajar. In 1937, Oveissi married Sharafat Baniadam, the daughter of Sharif Doleh Baniadam, and granddaughter of Sharif Doleh Bozorg. They were married until her death in 1972. The Baniadams were members of the Ghaffari family of Kashan.

== Education and career ==
Oveissi received his diploma from Iran's Military High School. He attended the Officers Faculty in the same class as Mohammad Reza Pahlavi continuing his military training in the Military Academy in Tehran where he graduated first in his class. The top graduates of the class were selected by Reza Shah to go straight to the Imperial Guard, an honour given only to the top five graduates. Oveissi sought permission from Reza Shah to be stationed at Khuzestan instead where the government was involved in battle with rebel groups. He attended the Military organization in Fort Myers, Virginia and Fort Leavenworth (Kansas) in 1959.

- From 1938 to 1939 he was chosen to command the Military Section of the 7th and 13th regiments positioned in Fars province and replaced the commander of the 6th regiment from 1940 to 1941.
- From 1941 to 1943 he replaced the military commander of Fars province, section 13.
- From 1940 to 1960 he was chief of the military faculty in Tehran.

After 1955 his military career progressed rapidly.

- On 12 September 1954, he became a full colonel and served with that rank until 1960 when he was promoted to general in the Imperial Iranian Army.
- From 1954 to 1955 he participated actively in the military court prosecution of communist officers.
- He continued his military studies in the United States periodically from 1960 to 1965, and became a full commander of the Imperial Guard.

Four Star General of the Army. From 1960 to 1965 Oveissi became a four star general of the Army, being the youngest of his peers to achieve the rank of four stars.

- In 1965 General Oveissi became the Chief Commander of the security divisions of the Policy Academy.
- In 1966 he served in the Committee of Information of the Imperial Iranian Army.
- In 1969 he obtained the highest military rank.

In addition, Oveissi served as the military governor of Tehran.

== CIA and Iraqi connections ==
During his exile in Paris after 1979, Oveissi continued his dialog with both the CIA as well as Saddam Hussein. To Saddam, Oveissi was a welcome connection with Iranian sources after the Iranian revolution. As the Shah's last general, he supplied Iraq with essential information on Iranian tactics under the new leadership of Iranian clerics. According to a historical article by the Brookings Institution, "both sides engaged in conspiracies and plots to subvert the other". In 1980, Oveissi foresaw weaknesses in the defence strategy of Iran, a fact that was warmly welcomed by Saddam. The same year, Oveissi travelled to NYC where he met with U.S. intelligence officials, who then concluded that a war between Iran and Iraq was imminent.

== Medals ==
General Oveissi received many military medals for his honourable and distinguished services in the Iranian Armed Forces, including:

1) Medals 1, 2, and 3 for his aptitude;
2) Medal of Honor 1, 2, and 3;
3) He was honored with a medal (level 2) for his exceptional effort in the counter coup d'état of 1953 (28 Mordad);
4) He received a medal for being a master marksman;
4) He received the medal of (Taj) crown level 3 Medal of Homayoun level 3;
5) Medal of appreciation and acknowledgement levels 1 and 2;
6) Medal for his tireless efforts and highly praised work levels 1, 2, and 3;
7) Medal for his services level 3;
8) Medal for his distinguished education.

Oveissi additionally obtained medals from various countries' military organizations. He received medals from Italian, British, Lebanese, German, and Ethiopian militaries as well.

== Personal life ==
Oveissi married twice. His first wife was Sherafat Oveissi with whom he had three children, Mohammad-Reza, Ali Reza and Fereshteh. She died of cancer in 1971. Oveissi married again in 1973. General Oveissi married Sharareh Oveissi with whom he had two children, Hossein and Shahryar Oveissi.

== Later years ==
In January 1979, Oveissi was pressured to resign and leave the country. He settled in France just before the Iranian Revolution on 11 February. In the immediate aftermath of the revolution, Ayatollah Sadegh Khalkhali, a religious judge and then chairman of the Islamic Revolutionary Court, informed the press that the death sentence was passed on the members of the Pahlavi dynasty and former Shah officials, including Oveissi.

== Death ==
Oveissi was shot dead, along with his brother, Gholam Hossein, on 7 February 1984 in Paris, Rue de Passy. He was 66 years old. The Islamic Jihad Organization claimed responsibility for the assassination. His death was considered by many as the blow that dealt the most setback to opposition groups poised to overthrow the revolutionary regime in Tehran. Two days before his assassination he was expected to fly back to the border of Iran to lead a counter revolutionary army of officers and men from elite divisions of the late Shah's military that was quartered in 22 makeshift barracks in eight Turkish villages and at five clandestine bases inside Iran. Since Oveissi had strong ties and the support of powerful members of the clergy including Grand Ayatollahs Mohammad Kazem Shariatmadari and Abu al-Qasim al-Khoei his elimination was priority number one for the newly established revolutionary government.

Military offices
| Preceded by Fathollah Minbashian | Commander of the Imperial Iranian Ground Force; 1972–1979 | Succeeded by Abdol Ali Badrei |
