= Karrar (tank) =

Iranian main battle tank

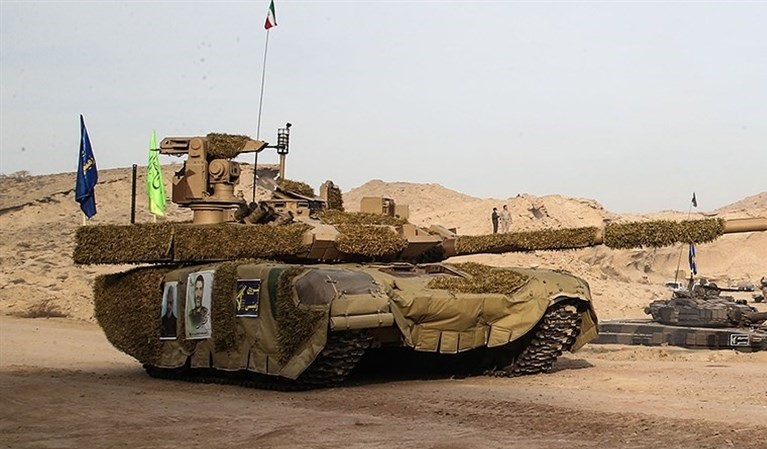
- Karrar main battle tank of the IRGC-GF participating in the Great Prophet 17 military exercise
- Type: Main battle tank
- Place of origin: Iran

Service history
- In service: 2020–present
- Used by: Iran

Production history
- Manufacturer: Bani Hashim Defense Industrial Complex
- Produced: 2017–present
- No. built: 150 ordered in 2017, another 650 ordered in 2018 which is to be finished by late 2020s. 800 total.

Specifications
- Mass: 51 tons / 51,000 kg
- Length: 6.8 m (hull) / 9.5 m / 9.78 m (total)
- Width: 3.68 m / 3.5 m 3.7 m
- Height: 2.5 m / 2.3 m
- Crew: 3 (driver, commander and gunner)
- Armor: Composite armor for the turret, with ERA (Explosive Reactive Armor) armor for the hull (possibly Relikt ERA "copy" for turret) and wire cage armor
- Main armament: 125 mm 2A46M/M-2/M-5 smoothbore gun (of the Russian design 2A46M) with stabilizer
- Secondary armament: coaxial 7.62mm machine gun and a remotely controlled 12.7mm machine gun (copy of the Soviet DShKM) / 14.5mm machine gun
- Engine: diesel
- Suspension: Torsion bar
- Operational range: Possibly around 500-550 km (plus with 200-280 km more from fuel tank)
- Maximum speed: ~70 km/h (43 mph)

The Karrar (Persian كرار lit. Striker or "Attacker") is an Iranian main battle tank. The tank was announced in 2016. At the announcement, it was stated that it possessed an electro-optical fire control system, a laser rangefinder, a ballistic computer and could fire at both stationary and mobile targets in day or night.

The Karrar was announced following failed negotiations to obtain a licence and the technology to produce Russian T-90MS tanks. It is based on the Soviet-made T-72, and attempts to incorporate elements of the T-90, American M1 Abrams, and British Challenger 2. However, it is believed to be inferior, and has been described as "little more than an upgraded T-72 with some additional indigenous components and aesthetic flourishes modeled after the T-90MS".

It is being manufactured at the Bani Hashim Defense Industrial Complex.

== History ==
In December 2015, the commander of the Iranian Army, Brigadier General Ahmad Reza Pourdastan, announced plans to buy T-90 tanks.

In early February 2016, Pourdastan stated that "since we can manufacture similar models within the country and we plan to do so in the near future, the deal is now off". According to some sources, Pourdastan also said they would potentially seek to acquire them through licensed production in Iran with assistance from manufacturer Uralvagonzavod.

The next day, Russian News Agency TASS reported that the Russian manufacturer of the T-90 expressed interest working with Iran "in the areas of T-90S MBT licensed production, T-72S MBT modernization and the upgrade of related facilities" after restrictions on military cooperation with Iran are lifted. A few days later the Iranian Defense Minister also mentioned the Karrar, claiming: "The defense industry designed and built the new battle tank from scratch. If not better, it's still as deadly as the Russian T-90".

In mid-February, the Lieutenant Commander of the Iranian Ground Forces stated that the Army had been ordered not to purchase the military gear unless Russia agreed to share the (production) technology, and that Iran was still hoping Russia would agree to such a deal. He also claimed that "Karrar tanks have been delivered to the combat units of the Ground Force."

In August 2016, video footage from Iranian Television "Telewebion" was published on YouTube showing the Karrar main battle during trials in the desert. In November 2016, the RIA news agency reported that Russia and Iran were still in talks regarding the T-90 tanks.

In early March 2017, Pourdastan stated that a domestically manufactured battle tank would be unveiled in the coming days and soon join the army, but added that Iran still planned to purchase T-90s.

On 12 March 2017, after the Karrar was unveiled to the public, Tehran announced that it would undergo mass production. Although at the time it was not clear if pre-production, or production models were being constructed.

Speaking to the Tasnim News Agency, Brigadier General Kiomars Heidari mentioned that the Karrar would be delivered in 2018.

In July 2018, the IRGC plans to procure up to 800 Karrar main battle tanks. On November 20, 2020, production models of the Karrar were deemed ready to enter service with the Iranian Army.

== Design ==
=== Armament ===
The main armament of the Karrar consists of a 125mm 2A46 smoothbore gun fitted with a fume extractor and a thermal sleeve. A remotely operated weapon station armed with a 12.7 mm machine gun is mounted on the roof of the turret. The main gun is able to fire anti-tank laser-guided missiles. A carousel autoloader is also present, removing the need of a loader.

=== Protection ===
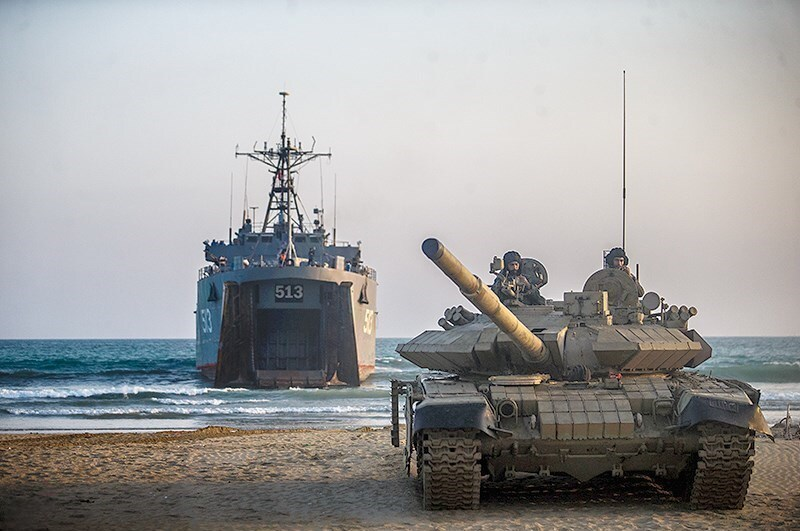
Karrar Main Battle Tank in service with the Islamic Republic of Iran Army Ground Forces.

The Karrar is supposedly fitted with latest generation of Iranian composite armor and with explosive reactive armor panels mounted on the hull and turret. There are also armour plates on the sides and slat armour at the rear of the hull and turret. The Karrar has three main types of ERA present. The first is what appears to be an Iranian copy of Relikt on the sideskirts and turret front, an unknown ERA on the top of the turret, and an extremely thick ERA on the front of the hull & turret sides previously seen on Iranian M60 tanks.

=== Countermeasures ===
The Karrar features four dazzlers, each containing an electro-optical jammer and 3 laser warning receivers as part of its soft-kill active protection system. Alternative configurations remove the dazzlers, and have a single 360° PLDS-S-1 laser warning receiver on top. The same 360° laser warning receiver is present on Iranian M-60 tanks. Once a laser lock is detected, the tank can use its 12 81mm launchers to deploy a smoke or aerosol screen.

=== Mobility ===
Karrar is equipped with a 1000 hp engine. This has not been officially stated but signs mounted on Karrar tanks present in Bani Hashem factory, Iran's main AFV factory alongside Shahid Zainuddin, had the words "hp 1000" written on them. Karrar's power to weight ratio is about 20 hp per tonne as a result, and its speed is stated to be around 70 km/h.

External fuel tanks can be attached to the rear in order to extend its range. The range without fuel drums is 500–550 km, but at least 200–280 km further with fuel drums.

=== Variants ===
On November 22, 2020, a service variant was shown. It lacked the metal sheet on the barrel, was painted in a tan color scheme, some tiny differences to the gunner's sights, upgraded optical systems, and an electro-optical jamming system.

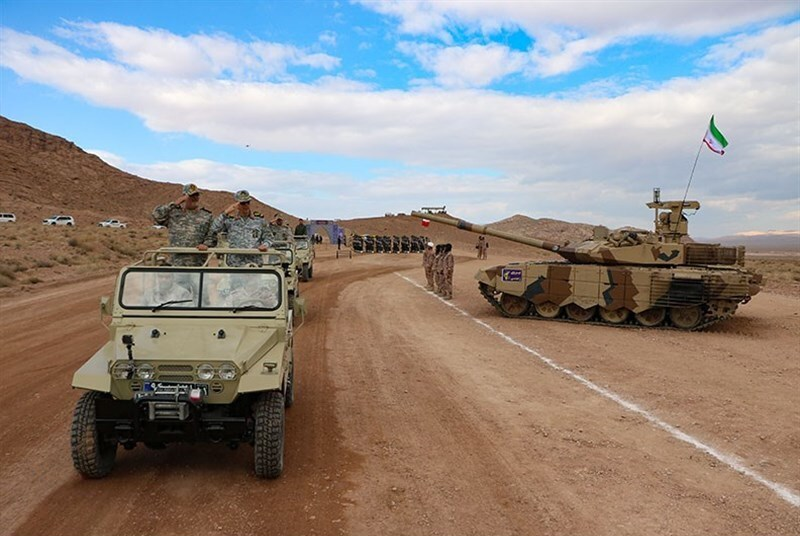
Karrar Main Battle Tank in service with the Islamic Revolutionary Guard Corps Ground Force.

=== Similarity to Russian tanks ===
"It is no coincidence that specialists regard the Karrar as some kind of a copy of the Russian-made T-90MS, the most advanced modification of the T-90 platform", according to retired Maj. Gen. Vladimir Bogatyrev, chair of the Board of the Russian National Association of Retired Military Officers. He also added that "It is based on the T-72 platform, but it also has something from the American Abrams and M60 tanks. Some elements are borrowed from the M48 and the British Chieftain tank. They took all these elements and tried to design their own tank."

Pictures of the composite array of the Karrar tank show it uses reflecting plates, identical to those in Russian T-90 and T-72B/S tanks. The turret utilizes of a design that resebles to that of the Russian T-90M/MS tank, albeit with a thicker front.

== Operators ==
- Iran
  - Islamic Revolutionary Guard Corps Ground Forces
  - Islamic Republic of Iran Army Ground Forces

== Gallery ==
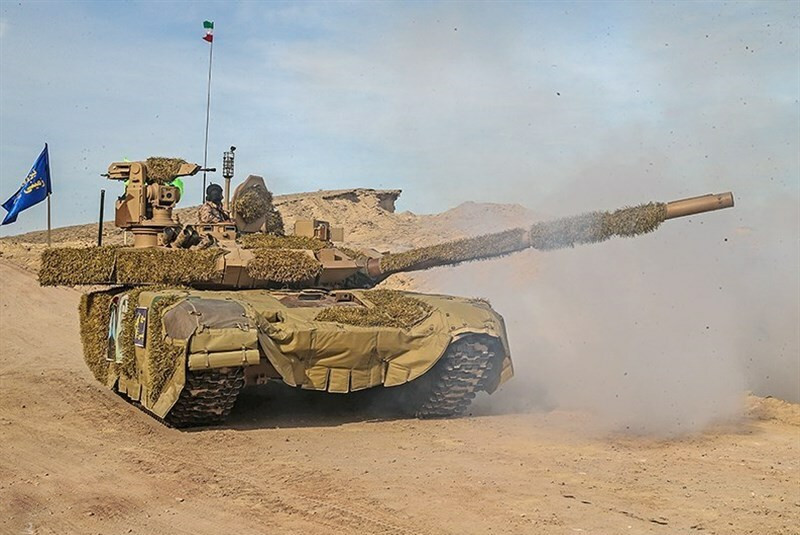

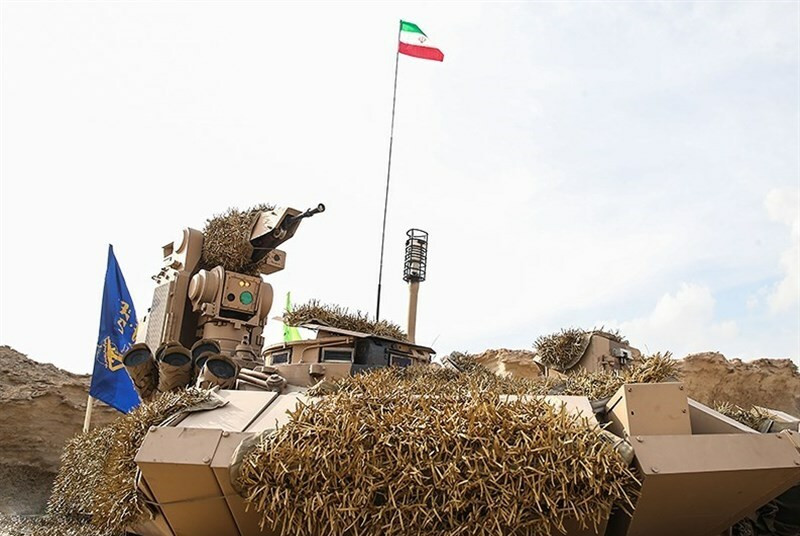

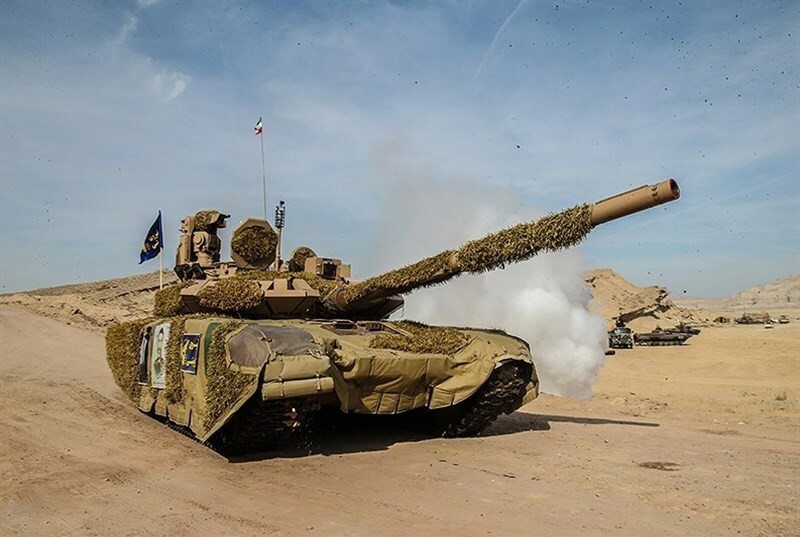

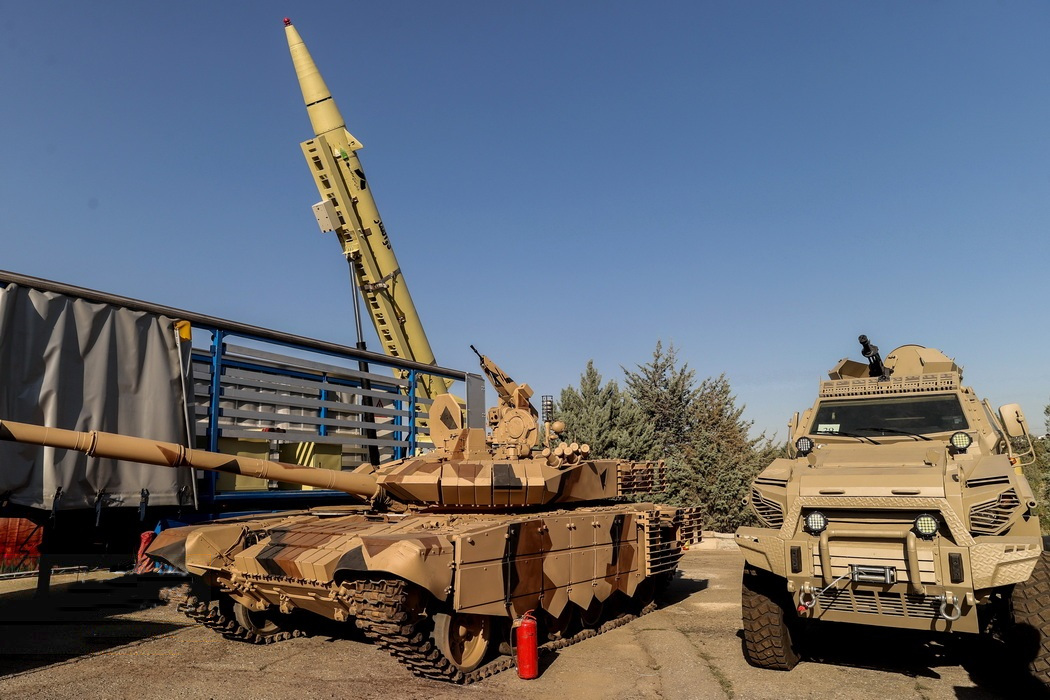

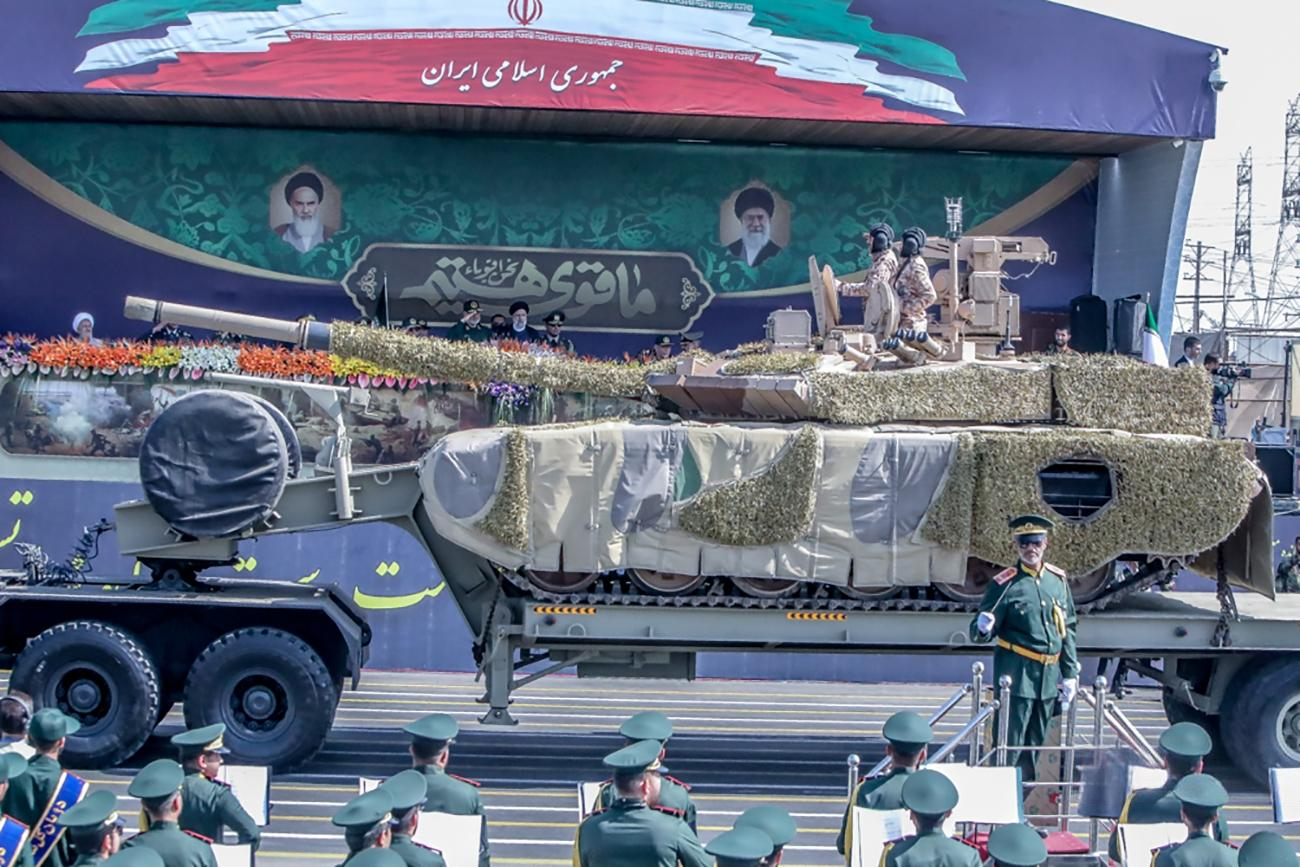

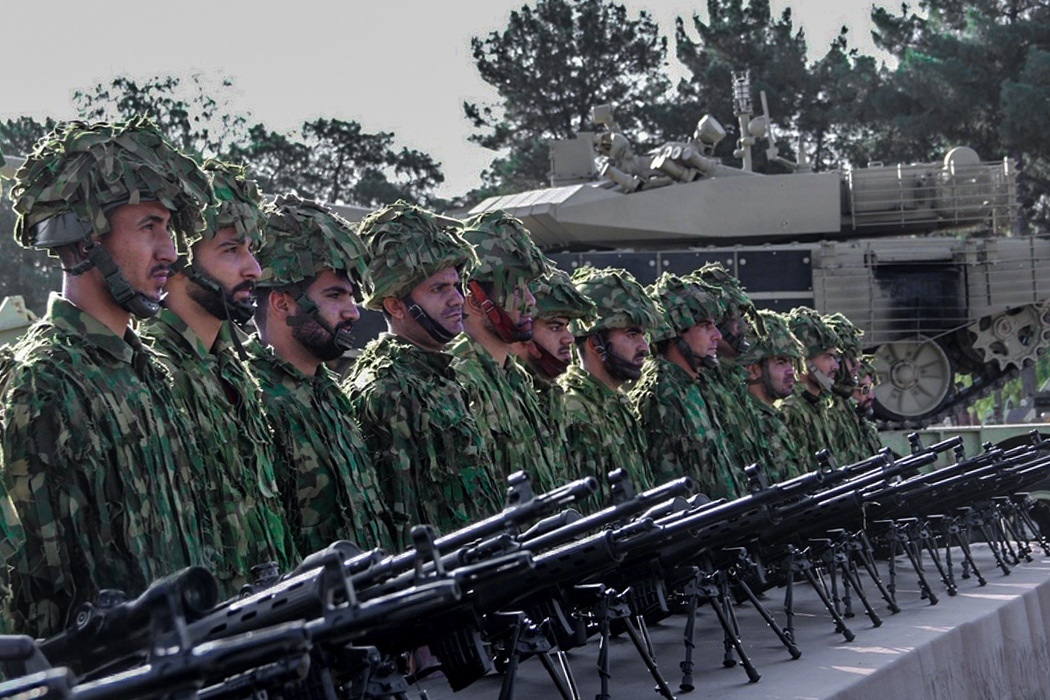

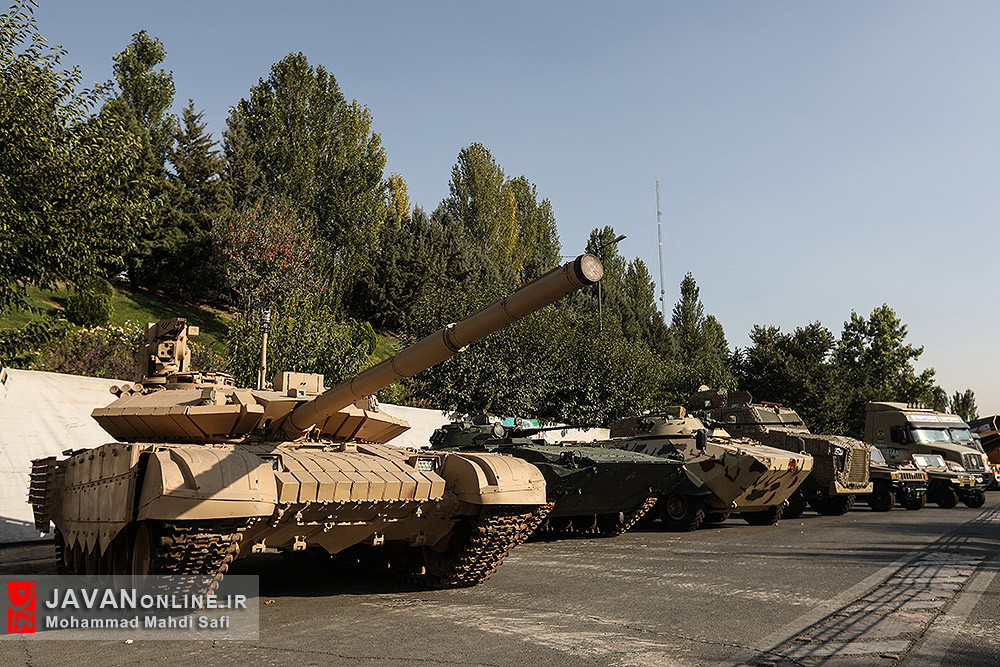
