= Neshat Jahandari =

Iranian airline pilot

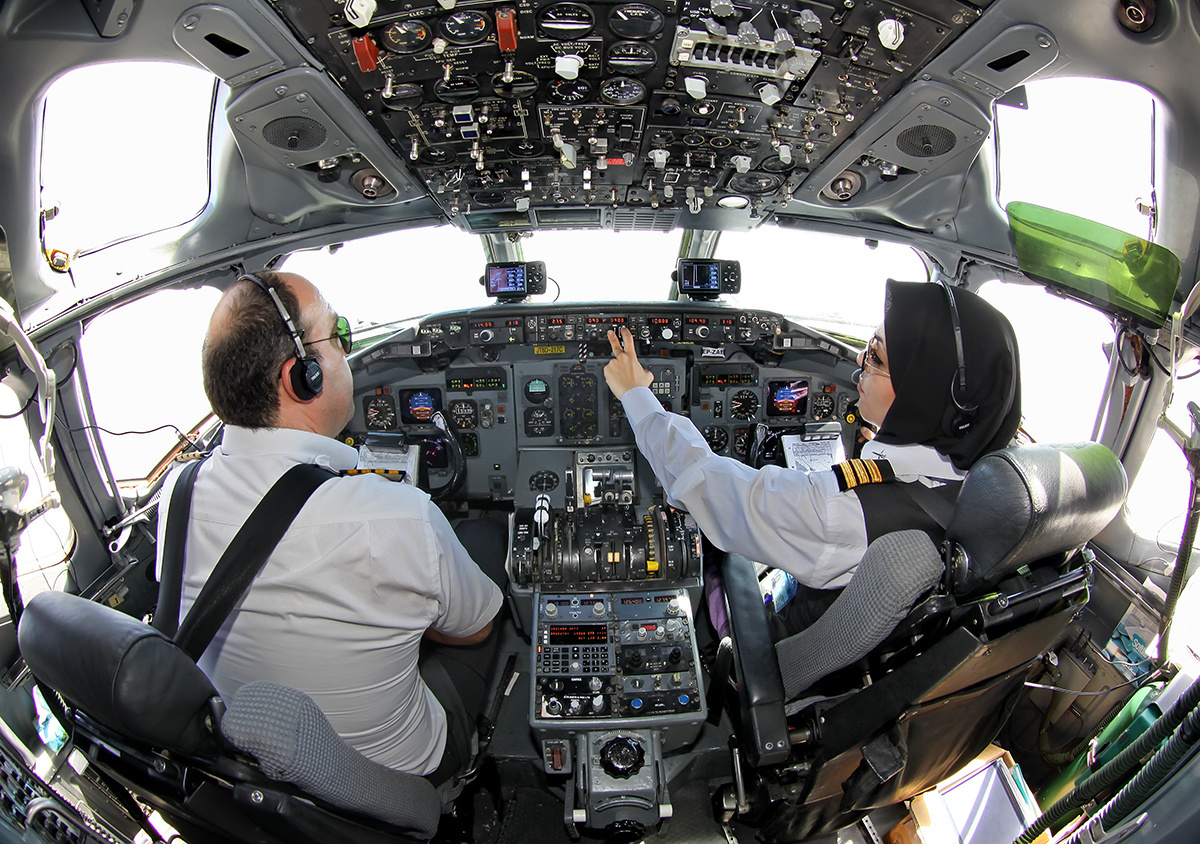
- Neshat Jahandari in 2015
- Born: November 22, 1989 (age 36); Tehran, Iran
- Education: University of Tehran
- Occupation: Pilot
- Years active: 2019–present
- Spouse: Farbod Shahpasandi
- Website: Instagram

Neshat Jahandari (Persian: نشاط جهانداری; born 22 November 1989) is an Iranian pilot. She is the second Iranian female pilot on a passenger airliner, after Ania Avshid, and the first since the 1979 Iranian Revolution.

She is the second female Iranian airline pilot, the first female pilot since the 1979 Iranian Revolution, and a member of the first all-female crew flight in Iran.

Ania Avshid was the first female airline pilot of Iran and the first woman to be officially employed as an airline pilot in Iran. She was employed by Iranian Airways in 1946 and flew a Douglas DC-3 as a first officer/co-pilot. Jahandari was the second female airline pilot overall in Iran and the first since the Iranian Revolution.

She flies the MD-80. She became famous after her inaugural video went viral. She has flown 3,000 hours and is the youngest and only female MD-80 captain of the airline.

== Early life ==
Jahandari began her pilot classes at age 17, while studying for her degree in aviation flight engineering technology. In an interview, Jahandari said that she got her pilot's licence before getting her driver's licence.

== Career ==
While no law in the Iranian Constitution prevents women from becoming pilots, Jahandari said that many considered it a male profession. She became a pilot for Zagros Airlines, and used her social media platform to encourage women to follow their passions, especially in countries where the law segregates jobs by gender.

Jahandari became internationally known as the first Iranian female pilot since the Iranian Revolution. She became Iran's first female certified captain since the Revolution in July 2019, when she was awarded four stripes, qualifying her to take full control of an aircraft, either on her own or supported by a co-pilot. In October 2019, Jahandari and Forouz Firouzi became the first all-female crew in Iran. They were congratulated by IranAir CEO Farzaneh Sharafbafi.

== Personal life ==
Jahandari married Farbod Shahpasandi, whom she says was one of the few people who inspired her and encouraged her to become a pilot. The couple live in Tehran and Mashhad. Jahandari is prominent on social media following her two major accomplishments, and many of her videos went viral on Zagros Airlines' social media. She uses her free time to encourage young Iranian women to pursue their dreams.
