= Hossein Hassani Sa'di =

Iranian military officer

Amir Hossein Hassani Sa'di
- حسین حسنی سعدی
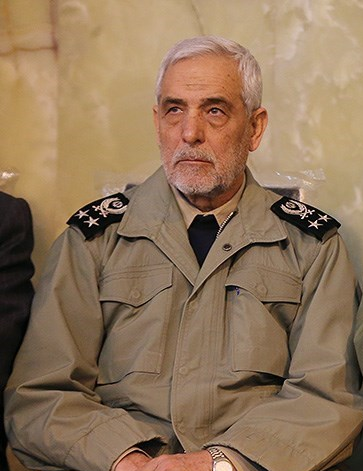
- Sa'di in 2016
- Born: c. 1940 or 1941 (age 85–86); Sa'di, Kerman, Pahlavi Iran
- Military career
- Allegiance: Pahlavi Iran (1961–1979); Iran (1979–2025)
- Branch: Ground Forces
- Service years: 1961–2025
- Rank: Major General
- Commands: Deputy Commander of the Khatam al-Anbiya Central Headquarters (2016–2025); Deputy Coordinator of the General Staff of the Armed Forces (1999–2016); Iranian Army Ground Forces (1986–1991); Deputy of Education of the Iranian Army Ground Forces (1985–1986); Southwest Regional Headquarters of the Ground Forces (1983–1985); Deputy Commander of the Southwest Regional Headquarters of the Ground Forces (1982–1983); 21st Infantry Division (1981–1982); Cadet Brigade of the Officer's School (1980–1981); Abadan Operations Headquarters (1980)
- Conflicts: Second Iraqi–Kurdish War; 1974–1975 Shatt al-Arab conflict; Iran–Iraq War; Operation Fatholmobin; Operation Beitolmoqadas; Battle of al-Faw; KDPI insurgency (1989–1996); War in Afghanistan (2001–2021); 2001 uprising in Herat; Insurgency in Sistan and Balochistan; Syrian civil war; Iranian intervention in Syria; War in Iraq (2013–2017); Iranian intervention in Iraq; Iran–PJAK conflict; Western Iran clashes; 2019–2021 Persian Gulf crisis; 2024 Iran–Israel conflict; Twelve-Day War
- Awards: Order of Fath

Hossein Hassani-Sa'di (Persian: حسین حسنی سعدی) is an Iranian regular military (Artesh) officer who served as commander of the Iranian Army Ground Forces from 1986 to 1991 and later as deputy commander of the Khatam al-Anbiya Central Headquarters from 2016 to 2025.

== Military career ==
Hossein Hasani Saadi was born in 1941 and completed his primary education up to his high school diploma. He officially began his service in the Imperial Iranian Army in 1961 and served at the 81 Armored Division of Kermanshah during early years of his career. Following the Iranian Revolution, he was appointed as the commander of the cadets Brigade at the Officers' School. During the Iran–Iraq War, he fought in the Operation Fatholmobin and Operation Beitolmoqadas.

Subsequently, he received two promotions for his impressive performance in the battlefield, and was appointed the commander of the 21st Division. He became commander of Iran's southern front (Nasr HQ) and directed much of the Battle of Faw. He replaced Ali Sayad Shirazi as the Artesh Ground Force commander in the spring of 1986, for his success in the latter operation. At the time, he was a 45-year-old officer with the rank of colonel.

Hassani-Sa'di was later promoted to brigadier general and, after leaving his post as Ground Forces commander in 1991, was appointed a military advisor to the Supreme Leader of Iran. He later served as deputy for interoperability and coordinating affairs in the General Staff of the Armed Forces of the Islamic Republic of Iran, during which he was promoted to the rank of major general. In 2016, he was replaced by Ali Abdollahi.

He served as deputy commander of the Khatam al-Anbiya Central Headquarters from 2016 to 2025, when he was replaced by Kioumars Heydari.

== See also ==
- List of Iranian two-star generals since 1979

Military offices
Preceded by Gholam Ali Rashid	Deputy Commander of the Khatam al-Anbiya Central Headquarters; 5 July 2016–25 November 2025	Succeeded by Kioumars Heydari
Preceded by Gholam Ali Rashid	Deputy Coordinator of the General Staff of the Armed Forces; 1999–5 July 2016	Succeeded by Ali Abdollahi
Preceded by Ali Sayad Shirazi	Commander of the Islamic Republic of Iran Army Ground Forces; 2 August 1986–8 May 1991	Succeeded by Abdollah Najafi
Preceded by ?	Deputy of Education and Training for Army Ground Forces; 1985–2 August 1986	Succeeded by Mohammad Kalarestaghi
Preceded by Himself as Deputy Commander	Commander of the Southwest Regional Headquarters of the Ground Forces; 1983–1985	Succeeded by Behrouz Soleimanjah
Preceded by Masoud Monfared Niyaki	Deputy Commander of the Southwest Regional Headquarters of the Ground Forces; 1982–1983	Succeeded by Himself
Preceded by Heshmatollah Dehkordi	Commander of the 21st Infantry Division; 1981–1982	Succeeded by Behrouz Soleimanjah
Preceded by Mohammad-Mehdi Katiba	Commander of the Cadet Brigade of the Officer's School; 1980–1981	Succeeded by Seyyed Ali-Akbar Hashemi
New title	Commander of the Abadan Operations Headquarters; 1980	Succeeded by Nasir Shokarriz
