= Syed Sulaiman Husaini =

Retired Iranian general (born 1962)

Sardar Syed Sulaiman Husaini
- ซัยยิด สุไลมาน ฮูซัยนี سید سلیمان حسینی

Religious Leader of the Shia Islamic community in Thailand
- Incumbent
- Assumed office 2005
- Monarchs: Bhumibol Adulyadej; Vajiralongkorn
- Preceded by: Unknown

Personal details
- Born: 15 September 1962 (age 63) Pahlavi Iran
- Party: Kla Tham Party
- Other political affiliations: Bhumjaithai Party (2025–2026); Prachachat Party (2023–2025); Socialist Workers Thailand
- Occupation: Politician, Scholar, Religious leader, Military officer

Military service
- Allegiance: Iran
- Branch/service: Islamic Revolutionary Guard Corps
- Years of service: 1982–2020
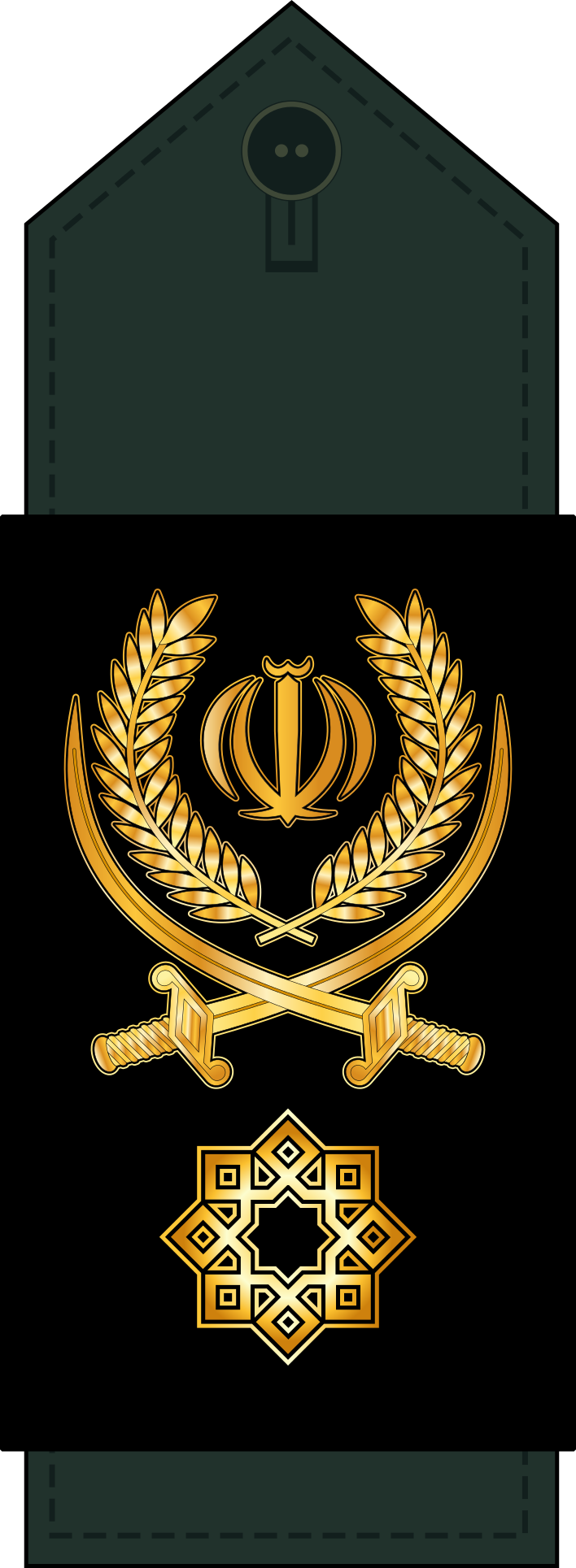
- Rank: Brigadier General
- Battles/wars: Iran–Iraq War; War in Afghanistan (2001–2021); 2001 uprising in Herat; 2006 Lebanon War

Syed Sulaiman Husaini (Thai: ซัยยิด สุไลมาน ฮูซัยนี; Persian: سید سلیمان حسینی; born September 15, 1962) is a retired general of Islamic Revolutionary Guard Corps and currently serves as the religious leader of the Shia Islamic community in Thailand. He is an advocate for the dissemination of the ideological teachings of Ayatollah Khomeini, the former Supreme Leader of the Islamic Republic of Iran. Husaini has notably engaged in diplomatic negotiations with Hamas to secure the release of Thai hostages in Israel. Additionally, he has led protests advocating for peace in the Middle East, specifically opposing the violence in Gaza.

Husaini has also been a vocal critic of United States’ influence in the Middle East, supporting the establishment of Palestine as a sovereign state, and participating in protests in front of the Israeli embassy in Thailand. His expertise extends to religious scholarship, particularly in the exegesis of the Al-Quran.
