= 21st Division (Iran) =

Iranian army ground forces infantry unit

21st Infantry Division of Azarbaijan
- لشکر ۲۱ پیاده
- Country: Iran
- Branch: Iranian Army
- Type: Infantry
- Size: Division
- Garrison/HQ: Tabriz, East Azerbaijan province
- Nickname: "Hamzeh" (حمزه)
- Engagements: Iran–Iraq War

Commanders
- Current commander: 2nd Staff Brig. Gen. Nader Najafi

21st "Hamzeh" Division of Azarbaijan (Persian: لشکر ۲۱ حمزه آذربایجان), based in Tabriz, East Azerbaijan province, established as combination of the 2nd Guards Brigade and the 1st Infantry Division in Tehran, with total of four mechanized formations (including brigades of the former 1st Guards Division and Independent Guards Brigade, and 141st Infantry Battalion.

The Iranian Imperial Guard was disbanded after the outbreak of the Revolution, and with the outbreak of the Iran-Iraq War, the 21st Hamzeh Division was formed from the merger of the brigades of the 1st Central Division and the 2nd Central Division, as well as the 144th Battalion of the Immortal Guard. As a Guards division, it was first formed in 1965.

The division has participated in various operations of Iran–Iraq War, including Operation Beit ol-Moqaddas.
