= Farzaneh Sharafbafi =

Iranian manager and academic

Farzaneh Sharafbafi فرزانه شرفبافی
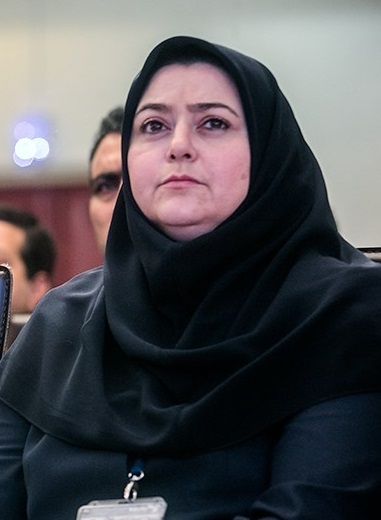
- Sharafbafi in 2017
- Born: 1973 (age 52–53); Tehran, Iran
- Education: Sharif University of Technology
- Occupations: CEO and Chairwoman of Iran Air

Farzaneh Sharafbafi (Persian: فرزانه_شرفبافی, born 1973) is an Iranian manager and academic who was the Chairwoman and was the CEO of Iran Air.

She has taught at Amirkabir University of Technology and Shahid Sattari Aeronautical University.
