= Imperial Guard (Iran) =

Imperial Iranian Army unit (1942–1979)

Imperial Guard of Iran
- گارد شاهنشاهی ایران
- Logo of the Iranian Imperial Guard
- Active: 1942–1979
- Country: Pahlavi Iran
- Allegiance: Shah of Iran
- Size: 18,000
- Garrison/HQ: Tehran
- Nickname: Immortals
- Colors: light red, blue and silver
- Engagements: 1963 demonstrations in Iran; Iranian Revolution

Commanders
- Commander: Ali Neshat
- Deputy Commander: Mohammad Amin Beglari

The Imperial Guard of Iran (Persian: گارد شاهنشاهی ایران, romanized: gârd-e-šâhənšâhi-ye irân), also known as Imperial Guard (Persian: گارد شاهنشاهی, romanized: gārd-e šāhanšāhi), was both the personal guard force of Mohammad Reza Pahlavi, the last Shah of Iran, and an elite combat branch of the Imperial Iranian Army. It was created in 1942 and disbanded in 1979 following the Iranian Revolution. It was named after the Immortals, an elite unit of 10,000 Persian soldiers in the army of the Achaemenid Empire.

== Origins ==
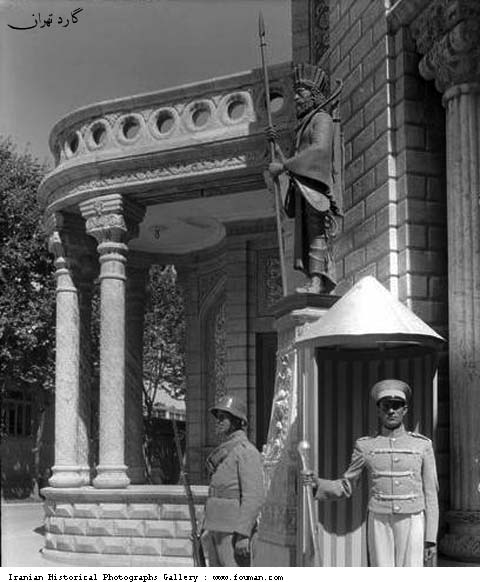
Imperial Guard Headquarters in Tehran

In 1921 a Persian Royal Guard was in existence comprising 20,000 men. A Guard Division was raised in 1925 by Reza Shah, incorporating both cavalry and infantry units.

Originally formed in 1942 with 700 volunteers, its early design was overseen by General Jafar Shafaghat. It was modeled after the French Republican Guard and the British Household Cavalry and foot guards.

Following the 1953 coup d'état, the unit was expanded to a division under Brigadier General Teymur Bakhtiar.

In 1963, a division of the Imperial Guard under Oveisi was reported to have been deployed to quell the 1963 demonstrations in Iran (in Tehran).

In 1972, the Guard was substantially expanded to a corps level, consisting of two divisions. This expansion was achieved by incorporating the Lashkari Guard Division and a conscript brigade.

The second-to-last commander of the Imperial Guard was General Abdol Ali Badrei, who served until the 1979 Iranian Revolution, after which it was disbanded.

== Structure ==
=== Javidan Guard ===
The core of the Imperial Guard was the all volunteer Javidan Guard (Gârd e Jâvidân, Persian: Guard), sometimes known as the "Immortals" after the ancient Immortals of the Achaemenid Empire. The Javidan Guard was based in the Lavizan Barracks in northern Tehran. By 1978 this elite force comprised a brigade of 4,000–5,000 men, including a battalion of Chieftain tanks. It was responsible for the internal and external security of the royal palaces. A special plain-clothes unit was called Ma'mourin Makhsous (Special Agents)

Prior to the 1967 Imperial Coronation a Pahlavi Cavalry Guard was formed, giving the Guard a Household Cavalry type mounted escort unit for ceremonial occasions. According to differing accounts this detachment was 30 to 50-strong.

=== Commanders ===
- Abbas Gharabaghi (1942–1946)
- Jafar Shafaghat (1946–1950)
- Iraj Mahvi (?–?)
- Mohsen Hasheminejad (1961–1974)
- Yusuf-i-nijad (1974–1979)

=== Main Imperial Guard ===
By the late 1970s the entire Imperial Guard (including conscripts outside the Javidan units) was 18,000 strong, with artillery, armored and helicopter units. The entire Guard comprised some 6% of the army, and were the only troops stationed permanently in the capital Tehran.

== Recruitment ==
A recruit to the Imperial Guard had to pass a series of proficiency tests, varying in subjects and difficulty. Reportedly one of the prerequisites for initiation was to be able to recite one's family history back for 23 generations from memory alone.

== Uniforms and insignia ==
Imperial Guard units were distinguished by salmon (light red) coloured insignia. The Pahlavi Cavalry Guard had special blue and red ceremonial uniforms, including silver cuirasses and crested helmets.

== Islamic Revolution ==
The Imperial Guard remained loyal to Mohammad Reza Pahlavi until his departure for exile in January 1979. After two days of fighting from the 9th through 11 February, against armed civilians and dissident Air Force and Ground Forces personnel, the Imperial Guard was withdrawn to its bases. The Guard was disbanded on 17 February 1979. The Javidan Guard was formally dissolved by the new Iranian state, although some portions of the wider conscript based Imperial Guard continued in existence. These remaining units were stripped of their historical privileges and duties before being integrated into the Islamic Revolutionary Guard Corps. As such they saw action in the Iran–Iraq War.

== Commanders ==
The last commander of the Imperial Guard at the time of the 1979 Iranian Revolution was Lieutenant General Ali Neshat. One of the former Guard commanders was General Gholam Ali Oveissi (1960–1965). One of the original commanders, General Jafar Shafaghat, during the last months prior to the fall of the monarchy in 1979 was appointed by the Shah as the minister of defense (the literal translation of this post from Persian is minister of war) under Shapour Bakhtiar Cabinet until the fall of the government.

Commanders of the unit were:

- Capt. Jafar Shafaghat and Capt. Bayandor (commanders of two rival companies with rotating responsibility)
- Lt. Col. Iraj Mahvi (two companies unified and expanded to a brigade)
- Col. Nematollah Nassiri (1951–1960)
- Maj. Gen. Gholam Ali Oveissi (1960–1965)
- Lt. Gen. Mohsen Hasheminejad (1965–1974)
- Maj. Gen. Abdol Ali Badrei (1974–1979)
- Maj. Gen. Ali Neshat (1979)

== See also ==
- Military history of Iran
