= 55th Airborne Brigade =

Brigade of the Islamic Republic of Iran Army

- Tippe 55 Hawābord
- The official insignia of 55th Airborne Brigade
- Active: 1970s-present
- Country: Iran
- Branch: Ground Forces of Islamic Republic of Iran Army
- Type: Airborne
- Role: Airborne infantry
- Size: Brigade
- Part of: Islamic Republic of Iran Army
- Garrison/HQ: Shiraz, Fars province
- Engagements: Iran–Iraq War: Operation Samen-ol-A'emeh; Operation Beit-ol-Moqaddas

Commanders
- Current commander: Akbar Shahverdi

55th Airborne Brigade of Shiraz (Persian: (تیپ ۵۵ نوهد) تیپ ۵۵ هوابرد, romanized: Tīp-e 55-e Hawābord) is an airborne separate brigade of Ground Forces of Islamic Republic of Iran Army based in Shiraz, Fars province. It was engaged in the Iran-Iraq War.

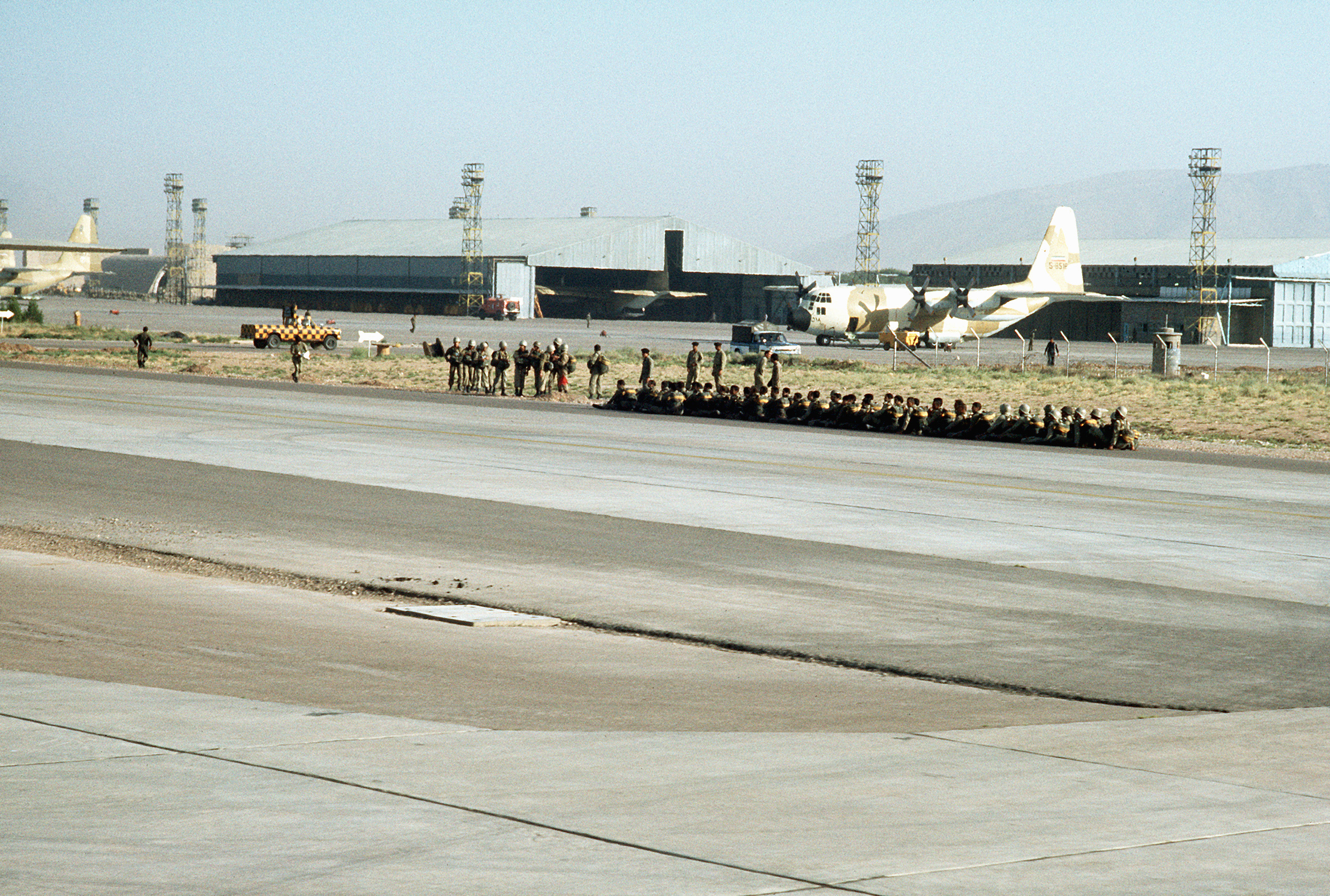
Paratroopers wait at Shiraz Air Base to board a Lockheed C-130 Hercules aircraft for a training mission during Exercise CENTO on 1 August 1977

== See also ==
- 65th Airborne Special Forces Brigade
- Special Services Wing
