= 16th Armoured Division (Iran) =

16th Armoured Division of Qazvin
- لشکر 16 زرهی قزوین
- Country: Iran
- Branch: Ground Forces of Islamic Republic of Iran Army
- Type: Armored
- Size: Division
- Garrison/HQ: Qazvin, Qazvin province
- Tanks: Chieftain
- Engagements: Iran–Iraq War

Commanders
- Current commander: Hossein Mohammad Shafiei
- Notable commanders: Siroos Lotfi; Abdolreza Shahri

The 16th Armoured Division of Qazvin is an armoured division of the Iranian Army, the Artesh, first formed during the reign of the Shah.

The 16th Qazvin Armoured Division was established in 1342 [1963-64] by the Imperial Iranian Ground Forces. The 16th Armoured Division of Qazvin was formed by the Imperial Army of Iran with a number of units that were abstracted from the Isfahan Brigade, Maragheh Brigade and Kermanshah Brigade. The unit officially started its activities in 1349 [1970-71].

During the Iran-Iraq war, the division was considered one of the army's operating units and participated in the operations of Nasr, Samen al-Aimah, Al-Quds, Jerusalem and Fatah al-Mubin, Ramadan, Valfajr Preparatory, Valfajr 1 and Khyber. Currently, the second Brigadier General Ali Karimi is in command of the 16th Armoured Division of Qazvin.
