= 88th Armoured Division =

The 88th Armoured Division (Persian: 88 Armoured Division of Zahedan) is an armoured division of the Iranian Army (NEZAJA).

The division traces its history to the Sistan Brigade of 1941; the 14th Makran Brigade after 1948; the Chabahar 88th Brigade of 1966–1968; and the 88th Armoured Brigade of Zahedan from 1976. From circa 1980 it was expanded into a division. It was listed in a Western survey of formations in 1983.

It serves in the Iranian province of Sistan and Baluchistan on the Pakistani-Iranian border, based in the city of Zahedan. This division, along with the 77th Infantry Division (Iran), serves in the eastern regions of Iran bordering Pakistan and Afghanistan. This division participated in hostilities during the Iran–Iraq War and killed 2400 soldiers, and the most prominent operations in which this division participated were Operation Karbala-6 and Operation Mersad.
