= 28th Infantry Division of Kordestan =

- لشکر 28 پیاده کردستان
- Country: Iran
- Branch: Ground Forces of Islamic Republic of Iran Army
- Type: Infantry
- Size: Division
- Garrison/HQ: Sanandaj, Kordestan Province
- Engagements: Iran–Iraq War

Commanders
- Commander in Chief: Governor-General Esmaeil Zarei Kosha
- Current commander: 2nd Brig. Gen. Abolfazl Barzegari
- Notable commanders: 2nd Brig. Gen. Kiyoomars Sharafi

28th Infantry Division of Kordestan (Persian: لشکر 28 پیاده کردستان), based in Sanandaj, Kordestan Province, is a division of Ground Forces of Islamic Republic of Iran Army. The division was established in 1300 SH (1921-22 AD).

Reports from the British side during the Anglo-Soviet invasion of Iran indicate that the 5th Kurdistan Division of the Imperial Iranian Army was headquartered in Sennah (Sanandaj) in what is now Kurdistan Province in October 1940.

The division participated in several operations of the Iran–Iraq War. It suffered losses of over 3,500 people and 800 prisoners.
