= Abdol Ali Badrei =

Assassinated army commander in Iran (1921–1979)

Timsar Abdol Ali Badrei
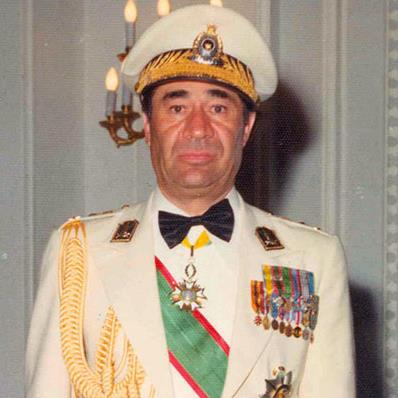
- Born: 29 March 1921; Kermanshah, Qajar Iran
- Died: 11 February 1979 (aged 57); Tehran, Islamic Republic of Iran
- Cause of death: Assassination
- Military career
- Allegiance: Pahlavi Iran
- Branch: Imperial Iranian Army
- Service years: 1941–1979
- Rank: Lieutenant general
- Commands: Imperial Ground Forces (1979); Imperial Guard (1973–1979)
- Conflicts: Iran crisis of 1946

Abdol Ali Badrei (Persian: عبدالعلی بدره‌ای) (29 March 1921 – 11 February 1979) was an Iranian lieutenant general and the last commander of the Imperial Iranian Army and the Imperial Guard. He was one of the hardline senior military officers and was assassinated during the course of the regime change in Iran.

== Early life and education ==
Badrei was born in Kermanshah on 29 March 1921. He graduated from the military academy in Kermanshah and Tehran.

== Career ==
After graduation, Badrei joined the Imperial army as lieutenant in the Mounted Infantry. His first mission was in 1946 to fight against rebels in Azerbaijan and Kurdistan province. Then he joined the imperial guards in 1946. in 1954, with the rank of Major, he became an adjutant to Mohammad Reza Pahlavi and served as a battalion commander in the immortal guards. In 1961, after completing staff college with the rank of Colonel, he was assigned to the Imperial Guard Staff, In 1967, he was promoted to the rank of brigadier general and served as second in command in the guards. In 1971, he was promoted to major general and was appointed commander of the immortal guards in 1973. In 1975, he was promoted to lieutenant general and was awarded the imperial order 1st class in 1976.

Badrei publicly stated that the army would not follow the orders of Prime Minister Shahpour Bakhtiar. Instead of being reprimanded by the Shah due to these remarks, he was named commander of the ground forces on 10 January, succeeding Gholam Ali Oveissi, who had resigned from office and left Iran. Badrei formed a group to carry a military coup on 10 February, just before the Iranian revolution. He served in the post of the Imperial Ground Forces commander until his death on 11 February.

== Death ==
Badrei was assassinated on 11 February 1979 on the Sultanabad barracks which was the army headquarters in Tehran. He was leading the troops of the Imperial Ground Forces loyal to the Shah which were fighting against armed civilians who were the supporters of Ayatollah Khomeini when he was murdered. Scheherezade Faramarzi argued in 2019 that the killer of Badrei was a teenager who was not aware of his identity. Upon his assassination the Imperial army was easily disintegrated by the Islamic government.

Military offices
Preceded by Gholam Ali Oveissi	Commander of the Imperial Iranian Ground Force; 1979	Succeeded by Valiollah Fallahi as Commander of the Islamic Republic of Iran Army Ground Force
