= 2001 uprising in Herat =

Insurrection and uprising in the Afghan city of Herat

2001 Battle of Herat
- Part of the Afghan conflict and the War in Afghanistan (2001–2021)
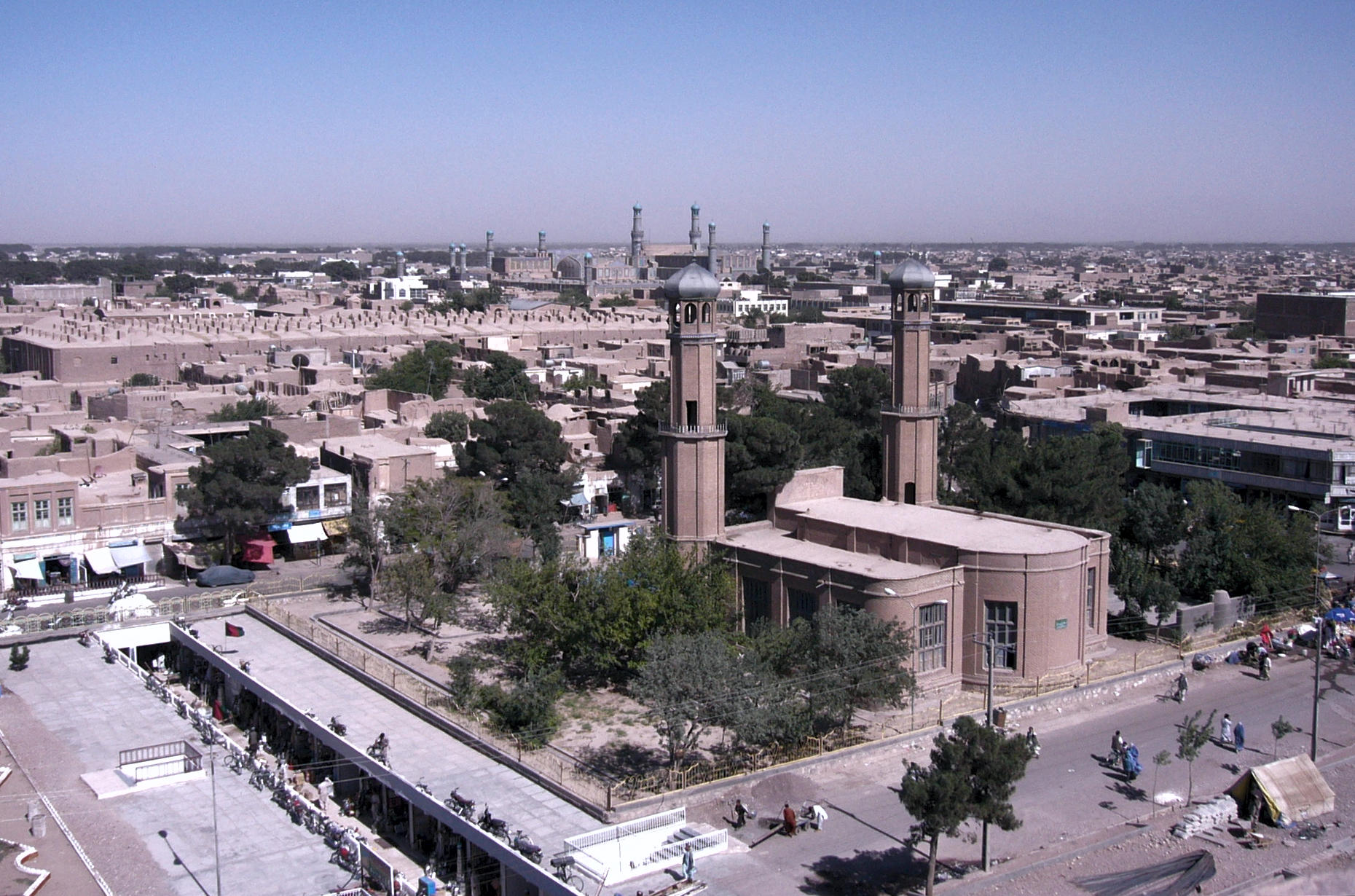
Date	November 12, 2001
Location	Herat, Afghanistan
Result	Northern Alliance victory

Belligerents
Islamic Emirate of Afghanistan al-Qaeda	(Afghanistan) Northern Alliance; United States; United Kingdom; Iran

Commanders and leaders
(Afghanistan) Mullah Omar (al-Qaeda) Osama bin Laden	(Afghanistan) Ismail Khan (Iran) Mohammad Salimi (Iran) Nasser Mohammadifar (Iran) Yahya Rahim Safavi (Iran) Mohammad Ali Jafari (Iran) Qasem Soleimani (Iran) Syed Sulaiman Husaini (Afghanistan) Mohammad Mohaqiq (United States) Tommy Franks

The 2001 uprising in Herat was a coordinated insurrection and uprising in the Afghan city of Herat as part of the United States war in Afghanistan. The city was captured on November 12 by Northern Alliance forces as well as Special Forces of the United States, the United Kingdom and Iran.

== Combatants ==
The U.S. Special Operations teams consisted of U.S. Army Rangers and Delta Force under the command of CENTCOM General Tommy Franks. Iranian forces consisted of agents of the Quds Force under the command of Major General Yahya Rahim Safavi, commander of the IRGC, and Major General Qasem Soleimani, the commander of Iran's Quds Force. The Northern Alliance faction consisted of over 5,000 militiamen under the command of Ismail Khan, a commander in the previous Soviet Invasion of Afghanistan and former governor of Herat before the Taliban came into power in 1995.

UK Special Forces remained anonymous for reasons of national security and did not reveal their formal command structure.

== Plan ==
The plan, organized by General Franks and General Safavi, was for Iranian Special Forces to discreetly enter the city and form an insurrection against the Taliban. This sudden event was to coincide with the entrance of Ismail Khan's band of Northern Alliance militia members into the city. Meanwhile, a team of U.S. Special Forces and CIA agents would oversee the operation in Tehran alongside Iranian military intelligence.

== Operation ==
Combat operations began on October 7, 2001. Towards the end of the month, U.S. air strikes hit targets in and around Herat, including tanks, communications facilities, and tunnel complexes. This also includes the Herat airport, where Russian-made fighters were destroyed.

On 11 November 2001, U.S. Special Forces Operational Detachment Alpha 554 ("Tiger 08") was inserted by helicopter near Herat. As planned, Iranian commandos secretly entered Herat to begin the insurrection on November 12, which successfully gave way to what Ismail Khan claimed to be, the local uprising against the Taliban leaders. The Northern Alliance, Shi'ite Hazara factions, and a small group of U.S. Special Forces then entered the city. Herati residents also took part in the uprising with sticks, knives, and guns hidden throughout the populace. The city fell as the Taliban fled towards the mountains along the Iranian border, leaving behind several abandoned tanks. Prisoners, including Chechen and Arab volunteers, were taken to undisclosed locations.

== Aftermath ==
The uprising was met with celebratory gunfire from residents. Iranian media even went as far as to report widespread celebration including 'dancing on the rooftops' and honking car horns. Ismail Khan consolidated his power as Amir of western Afghanistan, reportedly accepting truck loads of money from Iran over the following month to secure loyalty of his forces. Khan granted amnesty for former Taliban fighters, but warned of repercussions if said fighters were to take up arms once again.

Khan remained governor of Herat until 2004, when he was dismissed by Afghan President Hamid Karzai. Khan's dismissal was met with violent protests.

== See also ==
- Balkhab uprising
