= Islamic Republic of Iran Ground Forces =

Land service branch of the Islamic Republic of Iran Army

- نیروی زمینی ارتش جمهوری اسلامی ایران
- Founded: 1923
- Country: Iran
- Size: 350,000
- Part of: Artesh
- Headquarters: Tehran, Iran
- Mottos: All for one, One for all, All for Iran
- Anniversaries: 18 April
- Engagements: World War II; Anglo-Soviet invasion; Azerbaijan crisis; Joint Operation Arvand; Seizure of Abu Musa and Tunbs; Dhofar rebellion; Second Iraqi–Kurdish War; 1974–1975 Shatt al-Arab conflict; Iran–Iraq War; KDPI insurgency (1989–1996); Iraqi Kurdish Civil War; War in Afghanistan (2001–2021); 2001 uprising in Herat; Insurgency in Sistan and Balochistan; Syrian civil war; Iranian intervention in Syria; Iran–PJAK conflict; Western Iran clashes; Twelve-Day War; 2026 Iran War

Commanders
- Commander: Brigadier General Ali Jahanshahi

Insignia
- Flag

The Islamic Republic of Iran Ground Forces (Persian: نیروی زمینی ارتش جمهوری اسلامی ایران, romanized: Niruye Zaminiye Arteše Jomhuriye Eslâmiye Irân) (Persian: نزاجا, NEZAJA) are the conventional ground forces of the Islamic Republic of Iran Armed Forces. In Iran, it is also called Artesh, (ارتش) which is Persian for "army."

In 2025, the Central Intelligence Agency estimated that the regular Iranian Army ground forces had 350,000 personnel. Conscripts serve for 21 months as of 2015. Iran has two parallel land forces with some integration at the command level: the regular Artesh (Army), and the Islamic Revolutionary Guard Corps, also known as the Sepâh (IRGC). Thus the IRGC Ground Forces parallel the Artesh's regular ground forces.

== History ==
=== Antiquity ===
A national army of sorts has existed in Iran since the establishment of the Persian Empire. National armies usually appeared throughout the country's points of strength, while in times of weakness mercenaries and conscript armies were recruited temporarily from fiefdoms. The original core of full-time troops and imperial body guards were called the Immortals, these were established in 580 BC by Cyrus the Great. These were replaced by the Junishapur Shâhanshâh (King of Kings) in the Sassanid Dynasty after a period of disunity and chaos in the country. Following the Islamic invasion of Iran and eventual resurgence of Iranian dynasties a new full-time army was formed by the name of Qezelbash in the Safavid dynasty.

=== Qajar era ===
The Qajar period saw several attempts to re-model the traditional Iranian military based on western models. These were met with limited success.

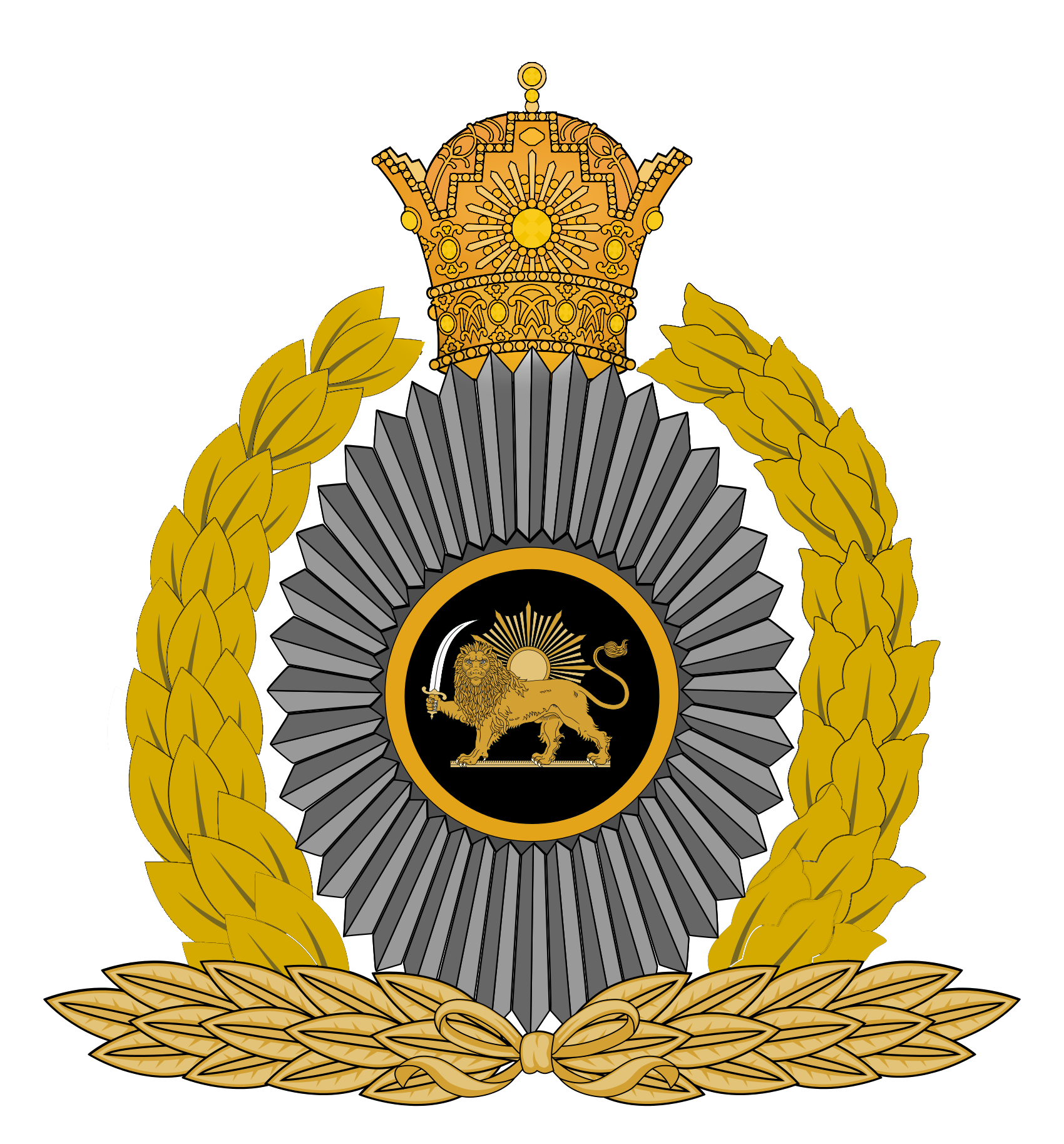
The insignia of the Imperial Iranian Army Ground Force

"In 1918 the Qajar armed forces consisted of four, separate, foreign-commanded military units. Several provincial and tribal forces could also be called on during an emergency, but their reliability was highly questionable. More often than not, provincial and tribal forces opposed the government's centralisation efforts, particularly because Tehran was perceived to be under the dictate of foreign powers. Having foreign officers in commanding positions over Iranian troops added to these tribal and religious concerns."

"Loyal, disciplined, and well trained, the most effective government unit was the 8,000-man Persian Cossack Brigade. It was created in 1879 and commanded by Russian Imperial Army officers until the 1917 Russian Revolution. After that date its command passed into Iranian hands, and the brigade represented the core of the new, Iranian armed forces. Swedish officers commanded the 8,400-man Gendarmerie, organised in 1911 as the first, internal security force. The 6,000-man South Persia Rifles was financed by Britain and commanded by British officers from its inception in 1916. Its primary task was to combat tribal forces allegedly stirred up by German agents during the First World War. The Qajar palace guard, the Nizam, commanded by a Swedish officer, was a force originally consisting of 2,000 men, although it deteriorated rapidly in numbers because of rivalries. Thus, during the First World War, the 24,400 troops in these four, separate, military units made up one of the weakest forces in Iranian history." After the First World War, the army had shrunk, but not much on paper, ostentiably numbering 25,000 in total. By 1920 it consisted of the Persian Cossacks; the Gendarmerie, expanded from two regiments that had stayed loyal; and the South Persia Rifles and the regular army, reduced to the Central Brigade in Tehran, with a theoretical strength of 2,200.

=== Pahlavi era ===
From 1922-26, Reza Shah as he would become introduced a series of reforms to unify the disparate forces. After unification of the forces, the Army was reorganized into five divisions to be based in the country's five largest cities.

Following the rise of the Pahlavi dynasty in 1925, the new Imperial Iranian Army became a priority. Azizollah Zarghami served as the chief of staff of the Imperial Army in 1934–1941. By 1941, it stood at 125,000 troops—five times its original size—and was considered well trained and well equipped. However, the army was focused on internal security operations, rather than, Farrokh says, fighting the "well-led and equipped Western and Soviet armies."

Ward writes that the 'army's sixteen divisions were spread across the country in their home garrisons, and only some of the western divisions had received any significant reinforcements of infantry and artillery. Maj. Gen. Hassan Mogaddam, the 5th Division commander, was put in charge of all western forces." The defence of the Khorramshahr-Ahvaz area was put under the navy's Rear Admiral Gholamali Bayandor, with his sailors plus a brigade of the army's 6th Division.

In August 1941 the Soviets and British launched the Anglo-Soviet invasion of Iran, which began on 25 August and lasted until 17 September. London and Moscow had insisted that the Shah expel Iran's large German population and allow shipments of war supplies to cross the country en route to the Soviet Union. Both of these proved unacceptable to Reza Shah; he was sympathetic to Germany, and Iran had declared its neutrality in the Second World War. Iran's location was so strategically important to the Allied war effort, however, that London and Moscow chose to violate Tehran's neutrality. From the south came the British Paiforce, under the command of Lieutenant-General Edward Quinan. Paiforce was made up of the 8th and 10th Indian Infantry Divisions, plus three other brigades. Meanwhile, the Soviets invaded from the north. Three armies, the 44th, 47th and 53rd Armies of the Transcaucasian Front under General Dmitry Timofeyevich Kozlov, occupied Iran's northern provinces.

Against the Allied forces, the army was overwhelmed in three days, while the fledgling Imperial Iranian Air Force and Imperial Iranian Navy suffered heavy damage. Conscripts deserted by the thousands. The army was reduced from 16 to nine divisions in the last week of August 1941, and Iran accepted the British/Soviet terms for an end to the war on August 31, 1941.

Reza Shah's institutional power base had been ruined. He therefore abdicated in favour of his young son, Mohammad Reza Shah Pahlavi. In the absence of a broad political power base and with a shattered army, Mohammad Reza Shah faced an almost impossible task of rebuilding. There was no popular sympathy for the army in view of the widespread and largely accurate perception that it was a brutal tool used to uphold a dictatorial regime. The young shah also wanted to distance Tehran from European military contacts. In 1942, he invited the United States to send an Army Mission, Iran to advise in the reorganisation effort. With American advice, emphasis was placed on quality rather than quantity.

In mid-1943, Colonel Ali Akbar Derakhshani was sent to restore order in Rezaieh and its vicinity. In October 1943, Derakshani presented a report to Mohammad Reza Shah at Marmar Palace, where the Shah expressed gratitude for his efforts. On October 26, 1943, Derakhshani was awarded a military medal personally by the Shah and, less than a week later, was promoted to the command of the 3rd Division with its headquarters in Tabriz, covering military forces in both East and West Azerbaijan provinces, despite still holding the rank of colonel.

The small but more confident army that resulted from American training was capable enough to participate in the 1946 campaign in Azarbaijan to put down a Soviet-inspired, separatist rebellion. During the three years of occupation, Stalin had expanded Soviet political influence in Azerbaijan and the Kurdish area in northwestern Iran. On 12 December 1945, after weeks of violent clashes, a Soviet-backed separatist People's Republic of Azerbaijan was founded. The Kurdish People's Republic was also established in late 1945. Iranian troops sent to re-establish control were blocked by Soviet Red Army units. When the deadline for withdrawal arrived on 2 March 1946, six months after the end of hostilities, the British began to withdraw, but Moscow refused, "citing threats to Soviet security," sparking the Iran crisis of 1946. Soviet troops did not withdraw from Iran proper until May 1946, following Iran's official complaint to the newly formed United Nations Security Council and intense pressure from the United States.

In 1944-1945 a U.S. financial advisory mission led by Arthur Millspaugh had produced potential future army size figures that clashed with the Shah's wishes, but after Millspaugh had been dismissed, the Majlis agreed to expand the army once more, and by autumn 1945 was proposing a 12,000 man increase to an existing plan for 90,000. But unlike its 1925 counterpart, the succeeding 1946 Majlis was suspicious of the shah's plans for a strong army. Many members of the parliament feared that the army would once again be used as a source of political power. To curtail the shah's potential domination of the country, they limited his military budgets. After the Second World War a U.S. Army Mission was placed on a more regular basis under General Robert W. Grow, and gradually grew in size. A host of western advisors slowly arrived.

In 1948 and 1951, British and U.S. reporting mentioned the 2nd Division of the Central Garrison [Tehran]; 3rd Division at Tabriz; 4th Division at Rezaiyeh; 6th Division at Fars; 7th Division at Kerman; 8th Division at Meshad and the 9th Division at Isfahan. Gholam Reza Azhari commanded the 11th Infantry Division in 1959-60. In 1959-60, with the implementation of a new army plan, the 6th Division was reorganized on a Western pattern with three brigades, and renamed the 8th Armoured Division. In 1964, with a perceived lesser threat from the Soviet Armed Forces, military attention was refocused on the south, and in February 1966 the Shah ordered formation of a new Third Corps, including parachute units, to be based at Shiraz.

From the 1966–67 edition to the 1969–70 edition, the IISS Military Balance listed the Iranian Army with one armoured division, possibly the 16th, seven infantry divisions, and one independent armoured brigade. By the 1971–72 edition, two armoured divisions, five infantry divisions, the independent armoured brigade, and other independent brigades were listed. Within two years after that, the listing quickly changed to three armoured divisions and three infantry divisions.

The 16th Armoured Division of Qazvin was established in 1963, "operational by 1970" according to its Farsi Wikipedia article. An infantry brigade at Charbahr became the 88th Armoured Brigade of Zahedan from 1976.

The returning chief of the U.S. Army Section, ARMISH-MAAG, Colonel Theo C. Mataxis, wrote in June 1970:

The IIGF has undergone six reorganizations since 1962. As a result, before one reorganization has been completed, another has been initiated. None have been carried through to completion. This is especially true of the IIGF Logistical System since combat unit force goals have changed so frequently that the development of a logistical unit plan to support them has never got off the ground.

The army was to become the world's fifth largest by 1979. Throughout the 1970s the Imperial Iranian Ground Forces, as they were then known, underwent a rapid transformation and increase in strength. During this period, Iran established the Imperial Iranian Army Aviation (IIAA). It was mainly equipped with American aircraft types.

However, the rapid, top-down modernization efforts could not overcome deep-seated political and structural issues, creating a force that was technologically advanced but fundamentally brittle. Too many sophisticated weapons were acquired too quickly for the Iranian Armed Forces to absorb and maintain them. The lack of adequately trained or trainable Iranian manpower, combined with competition for technical talent from the civilian sector, created a bottleneck for effective use and maintenance of the advanced systems. Thousands of US technicians and advisors were required to operate and maintain equipment.

The Shah deliberately ensured the Army's loyalty was to the throne above all else, deliberately suppressing independent political tendencies. The Shah personally had the post of commander of the 1st Corps in Tehran for a period. This resulted in the Army being primarily viewed and utilized as a tool for internal security against domestic opposition rather than a cohesive, externally focused conventional fighting force. Senior officers became "tightly-knit" around the Shah, discouraging initiative. This attitude spread to middle-ranking officers, and patronage and loyalty became more important than professional military competence. This resulted in structural weaknesses and a high degree of demoralization in the force by the late 1970s.

Despite the high-cost, high-tech arsenal, observers questioned the Army's actual combat competence and effectiveness in its conventional role. The speed and size of the buildup masked underlying organizational and training issues. In addition, the huge arms purchases, while initially affordable due to oil revenues, placed a substantial strain on the national budget and contributed to economic instability and inflation in the late 1970s.

In the early 1970s the Sultan of Oman was fighting the Dhofar Rebellion with British support. As a result of Sultan Qaboos's diplomatic initiatives, the Shah sent a brigade of troops numbering 1,200 and with its own helicopters to assist the Sultan's Armed Forces in 1973. The Iranian brigade first secured the Salalah-Thumrait road. In 1974, the Iranian contribution was expanded into the Imperial Iranian Task Force, numbering 4,000. They attempted to establish another interdiction line, codenamed the "Damavand Line", running from Manston, a few miles east of Sarfait, to the coast near the border with South Yemen (the PDRY). Heavy rebel opposition, which included artillery fire from within South Yemen, thwarted this aim for several months. Eventually, the town of Rakhyut, which the PFLO had long maintained as the capital of their liberated territory, fell to the Iranian task force. The IITF remained in Oman in December 1975, then at a strength of 3,000.

The Library of Congress Country Studies volume for Iran issued in 1978 wrote that:

"During the 1970s ..the Imperial Iranian Ground Forces was undergoing a rapid increase in strength; that year [sic] it was a largely mechanized and armoured force of about 220,000. In late 1977 its former organization into three army corps, with headquarters in Kermanshah, Tehran, and Shiraz, was dropped; divisional commanders subsequently reported directly to the army commander. The army contained three armoured divisions, each with six tank battalions and five mechanised infantry battalions; four infantry divisions; four independent brigades (two infantry, one airborne and 1 special force); and the Army Aviation Command (one infantry division and one independent infantry brigade formed the Imperial Guard). These combat units.. were said to be 85 per cent operational, though some outside observers doubted this claim. During the mid-1970s, fully 80 per cent of Iran's ground forces were deployed along the Iraqi border, though official sources maintained that a large portion could be sent anywhere in the country.. by means of air force transports. Troop deployment was expected to shift south in the late 1970s with the opening of the Chah Bahar facility."

"The rapidly growing Army Aviation Command, whose major operational facilities were located at Isfahan, was largely equipped with American aircraft, though some helicopters were of Italian manufacture. In 1977 army aviation operated some sixty light fixed-wing aircraft, though its strength lay in its fleet of some 700 combat helicopters."

Two years later, Gabriel listed the major formations of the Imperial Iranian Ground Forces in the final year of the Shah, 1979, as including the 16th (Hamadan), 81st, 88th (Zahedan/Chah Bahar), and 92nd Armoured Divisions. Other data suggests one division was being organised in Sistan Baluchestan, presumably the 88th Armoured Division. He also listed three infantry divisions, the 2nd in Tehran, the 28th Infantry Division at Sanandaj, and the 77th Infantry Division at Mashad; two infantry brigades (the 64th at Mahabad and the 84th at Khorramabad), the 55th Airborne Brigade at Shiraz and the Special Forces Brigade HQ in Tehran.

=== Islamic Republic of Iran ===
Military Ranks of the Iranian Army
Islamic Republic of Iran Army
Ground and Air Forces	Navy Forces
ArteshBod	DaryaBod
SepahBod	DaryaSalar
SarLashkar	DaryaBan
SarTip	DaryaDar I
SarTip Dovvom	DaryaDar II
SarHang	NaKhoda I
SarHang II	NaKhoda II
SarGord	NaKhoda III
SarVan	NavSarvan
SotVan I, II and III	Navban I, II and III
OsTovar I and II	NavOstovar I and II
GoroohBan I, II and III	MahNavy I, II and III
SarJookheh	SarNavy
SarBaz I and II	Navy I and II
SarBaz	Navy

Immediately after the 1979 revolution a series of purges gutted the core of the army's Western trained senior commanders. These included numerous executions ordered by Sadegh Khalkhali, the new Revolutionary Court judge. Between February and September 1979, Iran's government executed 85 senior generals and forced all major-generals and most brigadier-generals into early retirement. By September 1980, the government had purged 12,000 army officers. These purges resulted in a drastic decline in the Iranian military's operational capacities. Their regular army (which, in 1978, was considered the world's fifth most powerful) had been badly weakened. A shortage of spare parts for Iran's U.S.-made and British-made equipment began to cripple Iran's military forces. The desertion rate reached 60%, and the officer corps was devastated. The most highly skilled soldiers and aviators were exiled, imprisoned, or executed.

The last general to head the Imperial Iranian Army was General Gholam Ali Oveissi, who was assassinated in Paris along with his brother in 1984. He was replaced by General Abbas Gharebaghi, as armed forces chief of staff, who allied with the Islamic Republic and dismantled the Imperial Iranian Army, which was renamed the Islamic Republic of Iran Army.

The two Iranian Imperial Guard divisions were combined into the 21st Infantry Division.

The purges left the Army poorly prepared when Iraq invaded Iran at the beginning of the Iran–Iraq War. A Central Intelligence Agency assessment of 7 November 1979 said that Iranian military capabilities '..had not recovered significantly since the collapse of the armed forces in the February revolution. Ground forces capabilities remain limited despite some improvement in discipline and operational readiness in recent months.'

==== Iran–Iraq War ====
Iraq invaded Iran, beginning the Iran–Iraq War, on 22 September 1980. Throughout the war, Iran never managed to fully recover from the post-revolutionary flight of military personnel. Continuous sanctions prevented Iran from acquiring many heavy weapons, such as tanks and aircraft. When the invasion occurred, many pilots and officers were released from prison, or had their executions commuted to combat the Iraqis. In addition, many junior officers were promoted to generals, resulting in the army being more integrated as a part of the regime by the war's end, as it is today. Iran still had at least 1,000 operational tanks, and could cannibalize equipment to procure spare parts.

From July 1985, the IISS started attributing an estimated three army headquarters to the Iranian Army where previously no headquarters above division level has been identified. These were identified by other sources later as the 1st Army (HQ Kermanshah), 2nd Army (HQ Tehran) and 3rd Army (HQ Shiraz).

In 1987, and on the verge of the end of the Iran–Iraq War, the Artesh was organised as follows:

- Three mechanised divisions,
  - Each of which composed of three armoured and six mechanised battalions organised into three brigades
- Seven infantry divisions (seemingly including the 21st, 64th and 77th Infantry Divisions),
- One special forces division composed of four brigades,
- One airborne brigade (55th Airborne Brigade?)
- One air support command,

and some independent armoured brigades including infantry and a "coastal force."

The war finally ended in 1988.

==== Post Iran–Iraq War ====
A new cadre of commanders, shaped by their experiences in the war, drastically reduced reliance on foreign supplied equipment and training. Following the war the military pursued a dramatic restructuring, much of it under total secrecy. While still only a mere shadow of its pre-revolutionary self, the Artesh rapidly re-asserted its abilities and started to grow again.

The IISS determined that at some point between 1992 and 1995 an additional army headquarters was raised (making a total of four). Later, some time between mid-1997 and mid-1999, the listing changed to that of four corps. The Jaffee Center's Middle East Military Balance 99-00 also lists the four corps the IISS had attributed.

Jane's reported in 2006 that the Army was commanded via three army level headquarters with 15 divisions. The IISS reported in the Military Balance 2008 that there 12 Corps level regional headquarters, five armoured divisions with some independent brigades, seven infantry divisions with some independent brigades, one special forces brigade, two commando divisions with some independent brigades, plus an airborne brigade. There were also six artillery groups, and aviation forces. The number of divisions reported has not changed for some years. Often reported formations include the 23rd Special Forces Division, established in 1993–94, and the 55th Paratroop Division. Jane's Sentinel Security Assessments reports that the 23rd Special Forces Division is amongst the most professional formations in the Iranian Army, with at least 6,000 personnel, all of whom are believed to be regulars.

The regular armoured divisions, including the 92nd Armored Division, are sub-divided into three brigades.

== Structure ==
=== 2012 ===
Globalsecurity.org said on its page on the Iranian Army:

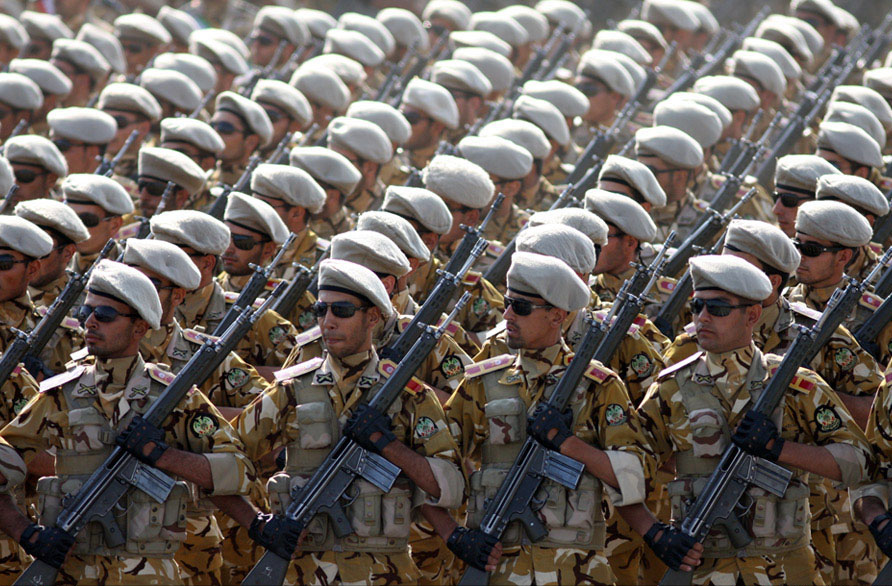
IRIA Soldiers marching in formation

- "The regular army.. has a number of independent brigades and groups, though there is almost no reliable data on the size and number of these smaller independent formations. These include one logistics brigade, an infantry brigade, an airborne brigade, special forces (Takavar) brigades, and five artillery brigades/regiments. There are also coastal defence units, a growing number of air defence groups, between four and six army aviation units, and a growing number of logistics and supply formations."
- "There are a variety of other reports of doubtful veracity. Some sources claim that small light formations in the regular army include an Airmobile Forces Group created after the Iran–Iraq War. This formation is said to include the 29th Special Forces Division, which was formed in 1993-1994, and the 55th Paratroop Division. Other sources claim that the commando forces of the regular army and IRGC are integrated into a Corps of about 30,000 soldiers, with integrated helicopter lift and air assault capabilities. These airborne and special forces troops are said to train together at Shiraz."

Many of these assessments appear to be copyright violations from research conducted by the Burke Chair in Strategy at the Center for Strategic and International Studies, Washington DC, for example, an updated military balance report dated 2012.(see also CSIS Iran and Gulf Military Balance, 11 July 2012, p51

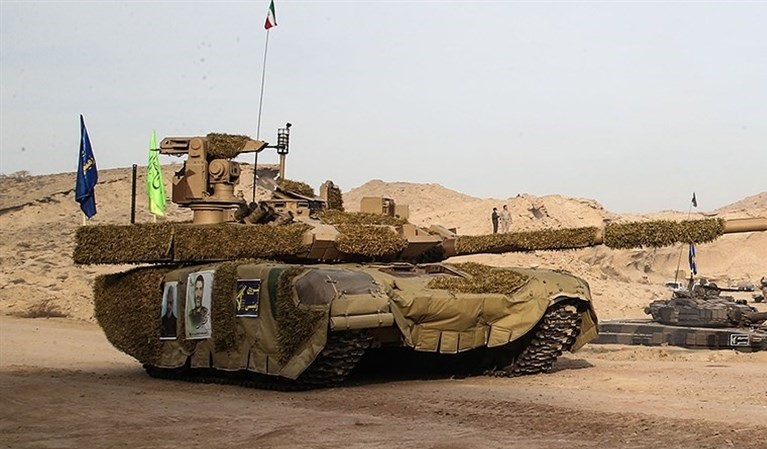
Karrar Main Battle Tank, The most advanced Iranian tank in service

Since 2010 the Iranian Army has undergone a reorganization process called the "Thamen alaeme general structure plan" (طرح جامع ساختاری ثامن الائمه). This plan has refocused the Army on a brigade-centered model, and involved a re-positioning of Army bases, the adding of new units and an increase in mobility of existing army units. To that effect, it has sheered off some brigades from existing divisions as well as establishing new brigades alongside of them. By March 2012 31 new independent brigades have been established throughout the army.

The International Institute for Strategic Studies' Military Balance 2026 estimated that the regular army had five corps-level regional headquarters; four armoured division headquarters; two mechanised infantry division headquarters; four infantry division headquarters; a commando division headquarters with three commando brigades associated with it; three additional commando brigades; a special forces brigade; eight armoured brigades; 14 mechanised infantry brigades; 12 infantry brigades; an airborne brigade; some aviation groups; and five artillery groups.

== Iranian Army commissioned officers and enlisted ranks ==
Officers

Rank group	General / flag officers					Senior officers			Junior officers
Iranian Ground Forces
Iranian Ground Forces	ارتشبد; Arteshbod	سپهبد; Sepahbod	سرلشکر; Sarlashkar	سرتیپ; Sartip	سرتیپ دوم; Sartip dovom	سرهنگ; Sarhang	سرهنگ دوم; Sarhang dovom	سرگرد; Sargord	سروان; Sarvān	ستوان یکم; Sotvān yekom	ستوان دوم; Sotvān dovom	ستوان سوم; Sotvān sevom

Enlisted

Rank group	Senior NCOs					Junior NCOs		Enlisted
Iranian Ground Forces
Iranian Ground Forces	استوار یکم; Ostovar yekom	استوار دوم; Ostovar dovom	گروهبان یکم; Goruhban yekom	گروهبان دوم; Goruhban dovom	گروهبان سوم; Goruhban sevom	سرجوخه; Sarjukheh	سرباز یکم; Sarbaz yekom	سرباز دوم; Sarbaz dovom	سرباز; Sarbaz

== Equipment ==
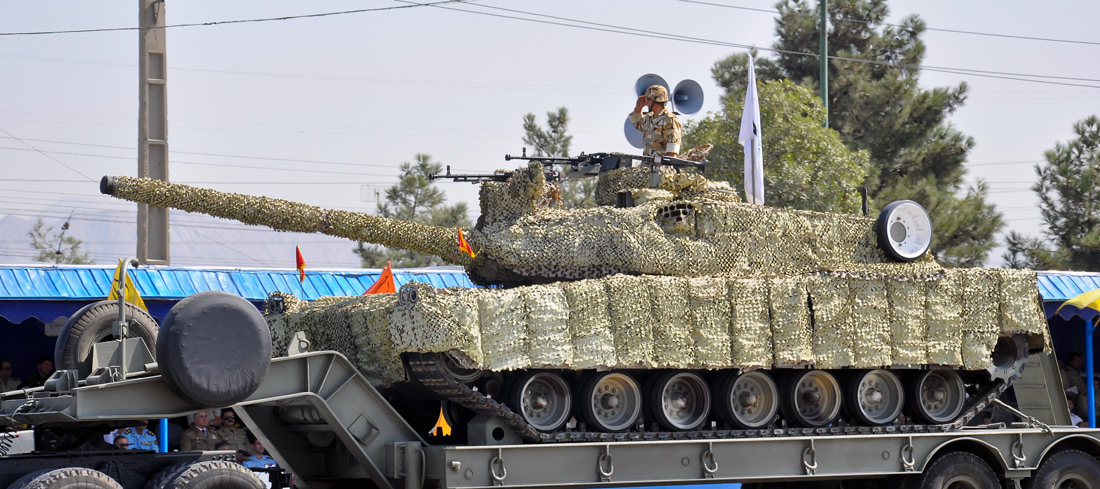
An Iranian-made Zulfiqar tank

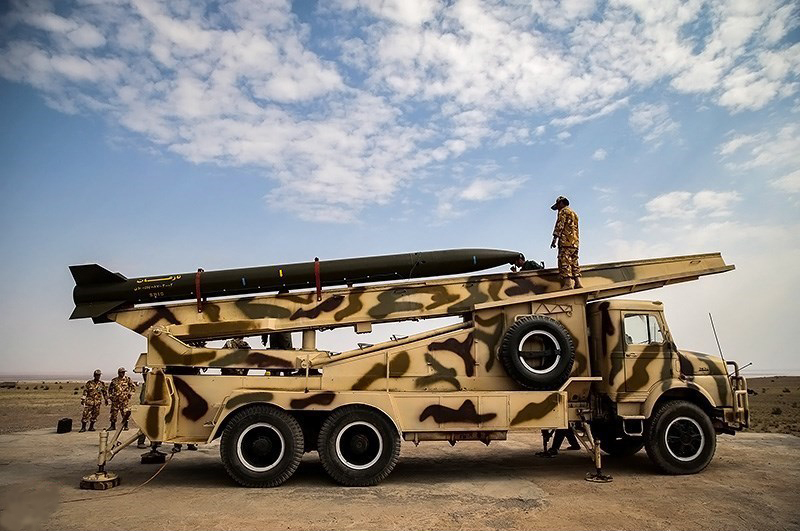
Naze'at long-range artillery rockets

Most soldiers of the Iranian Army are well trained and determined, but their equipment tends to be outdated. They primarily use outdated Western-style equipment or newer, locally produced equipment, which is lower quality, along with foreign-imported Chinese and Soviet/Russian weapons and equipment.

Iran's main battle tanks include an estimated ~1500 or possibly more, indigenous Zulfiqar MBTs, 480 T-72S, 150 M-60A1s, 75 T-62s, 100 Chieftain Mk 3/Mk 5 MBTs, 540 T-54/T-55/Type 59s, and 150 M-47/M-48s. Separately reported are Karrar tanks.

The Zulfiqar is the defence industry of Iran's most recent main battle tank, named after the twin-pointed legendary sword of Ali. Born as the brainchild of Brigadier General Mir-Younes Masoumzadeh, deputy ground force commander for research and self-sufficiency of the armed forces, the vehicle has been developed from major components of the American M-60 tank. One of the features which has drawn the attention of the Defense Ministry is that indigenously made parts have been used in it. The prototypes of the tank were tested in 1993. Six semi-industrial prototypes were produced and tested in 1997. The IISS estimates that around 150 Zulfiqar 1's are now in service.

The main attack helicopter of the Islamic Republic of Iran Army is the AH-1J Sea Cobra. The number of AH-1Js in service was estimated by the IISS in 2009 as 50, though 202 were delivered before the 1979 Iranian Revolution. Iran also operates an unknown number of the Panha 2091, which is an unlicensed, locally made upgrade of the AH-1J.

The main transport helicopter of the Islamic Republic of Iran Army is the CH-47C Chinook. The number of CH-47Cs in service was estimated as 20 though 57 were delivered before the 1979 Iranian Revolution. Islamic Republic of Iran Army lost one of them in 2011.

== Commanders ==
No.	Portrait	Commander-in-Chief	Took office	Left office	Time in office	Ref.
Commander of the Imperial Iranian Ground Force
–	Mohammadreza Shahandeh	Major General; Mohammadreza Shahandeh; Acting	23 August 1955	30 October 1955	0 years	
1	Bahram Aryana	General; Bahram Aryana (1906–1985)	30 October 1955	11 February 1958	2–3 years	
2	Abdol Hossein Hejazi	General; Abdol Hossein Hejazi (1904–1969)	11 February 1958	15 March 1961	2–3 years	
3	Reza Azimi	General; Reza Azimi (1909–1999)	15 March 1961	1965	3–4 years	
4	Ezzatollah Zarghami	General; Ezzatollah Zarghami	1965	11 May 1969	3–4 years	
5	Fathollah Minbashian	General; Fathollah Minbashian (1916–2007)	11 May 1969	17 November 1972	2–3 years	
6	Gholam Ali Oveissi	General; Gholam Ali Oveissi (1918–1984)	17 November 1972	10 January 1979	6–7 years	
7	Abdol Ali Badrei	Lieutenant General; Abdol Ali Badrei (1919–1979)	10 January 1979	11 February 1979 †	0 years	
Commander of the Islamic Republic of Iran Army Ground Forces
1	Valiollah Fallahi	Brigadier general Valiollah Fallahi (1931–1981)	11 February 1979	19 June 1980	0–1 years	
2	Qasem-Ali Zahirnejad	Brigadier general Qasem-Ali Zahirnejad (1924–1999)	19 June 1980	1 October 1981	0–1 years	
3	Ali Sayad Shirazi	Colonel; Ali Sayad Shirazi (1944–1999)	1 October 1981	2 August 1986	4 years	
4	Hossein Hassani Sa'di	Colonel; Hossein Hassani Sa'di (born 1940 or 1941)	2 August 1986	8 May 1991	4 years	
5	Abdollah Najafi	Brigadier general Abdollah Najafi (born 1951)	8 May 1991	25 October 1994	3 years	
6	Ahmad Dadbin	Brigadier general Ahmad Dadbin (born 1955)	25 October 1994	1 October 1997	2–3 years	
7	Abdolali Pourshasb	Brigadier general Abdolali Pourshasb (born 1948)	1 October 1997	7 February 2001	3–4 years	
8	Nasser Mohammadifar	Brigadier general Nasser Mohammadifar (1945–2026)	7 February 2001	26 September 2005	3–4 years	
9	Mohammad-Hossein Dadras	Brigadier general Mohammad-Hossein Dadras	26 September 2005	25 August 2008	2–3	
10	Ahmad Reza Pourdastan	Brigadier general Ahmad Reza Pourdastan (born 1961)	25 August 2008	19 November 2016	7–8	
11	Kioumars Heydari	Brigadier general Kioumars Heydari (born 1964)	19 November 2016	22 November 2025	9 years, 3 days	
12	Ali Jahanshahi	Brigadier general Ali Jahanshahi	22 November 2025	Incumbent	358 days	

== See also ==
- International armed forces/military rankings of Iran
- List of armies by country
- Ebrahim Zolfaghari
