= Deaths in September 1981 =

The following is a list of notable deaths in September 1981.

Entries for each day are listed alphabetically by surname. A typical entry lists information in the following sequence:

- Name, age, country of citizenship at birth, subsequent country of citizenship (if applicable), reason for notability, cause of death (if known), and reference.

== September 1981 ==
=== 1 ===
- Ann Harding, 79, American actress, she was nominated for the Academy Award for Best Actress for her role in the romantic comedy film Holiday (1930)
- Albert Speer, 76, German architect and Nazi Party politician, he served as the Reich Minister of Armaments and War Production from 1942 until 1945, he briefly served as the Minister of Industry and Production of the Flensburg Government in May 1945,he was one of the defendants at the International Military Tribunal and was sentenced to 20 years of imprisonment in 1946,he revised his prison writings into two autobiographical books, Inside the Third Reich and Spandau: The Secret Diaries, he later published a biographical work about Heinrich Himmler and Himmler's Schutzstaffel (SS) under the English title The Slave State: Heinrich Himmler's Masterplan for SS Supremacy, stroke while visiting London to participate in the BBC show Newsnight

=== 2 ===
- Enid Lyons, 84, Australian politician she served as the Vice-President of the Executive Council from 1949 until 1951, becoming the first woman to serve in cabinet, she opposed the cabinet's decision to commit Australian troops to the Korean War.
- Andrija Maurović, 80. Croatian comic book writer and illustrator, a pioneer of pornography, at a time when pornography was mostly absent from the mainstream media, Maurović published a series of drawings alluding to extramarital and marital relations

=== 3 ===
- Rafael Albaicín, 62, Spanish matador, actor, pianist, and violinist
- Ella Hall, 84, American actress, mother to fellow actors Ellen Hall and Richard Emory,stroke (Note: Death certificate - Ella Augusta Hall death certificate is available for purchase from the Registrar-Recorder/County Clerk for Birth, Death & Marriage Records in Norwalk, California Certificate of Death 0190 040428; Ella Hall Died: September 3, 1981, 07:07; Born New Jersey March 17, 1897, Age – 84 yrs old; Father – Unk; Mother – Mary Muller, New York Occupation – Housemaker Usual residence: 22437 Victory Blvd, Los Angeles Informant H. Edward Moxley, Son-in-law, same address Death Certificate signed September 3, 1981 Death caused by massive cardiovascular accident Stroke)

=== 5 ===
- Donald Sinclair, 72, English naval officer and hotel owner, World War II veteran of the Battle of the Atlantic, the Battle of Madagascar, and Operation Torch, co-proprietor of the Gleneagles Hotel in Torquay, he was caricatured as the character Basil Fawlty in the television sitcom Fawlty Towers, inspired by Sinclair's allegedly stuffy, snobbish and eccentric treatment of his guests, including the members of the Monty Python cast. Death due to complications from a stroke which he had suffered in August, when disgruntled workmen vandalised both Sinclair's patio furniture and Sinclair's car

=== 6 ===
- Maria Palmer, 64, Austrian-born American actress, she emigrated to the United States in 1938, she gained attention for her stage performances with the 1942 production of The Moon Is Down, cancer

=== 7 ===
- Christy Brown, 49, Irish writer and painter, he was born with severe cerebral palsy, he learned to write and draw with his left leg, the only limb over which he had effective control,he is primarily known for the autobiographical work My Left Foot (1954),choking death while having dinner
- Edwin Albert Link, 77, American inventor, entrepreneur, and pioneer in the fields of aviation, underwater archaeology, and submersibles, he commercialized the flight simulator known as the "Link Trainer" in 1929, starting a multibillion-dollar industry, he died in his sleep while undergoing cancer treatment

=== 8 ===
- Roy Wilkins, 80, American civil rights activist, he served as the Executive Secretary of the National Association for the Advancement of Colored People (NAACP) from 1955 until 1963, and as the executive director of the same organization from 1964 until 1977, heart problems related to his pacemaker. Wilkins encouraged African-Americans to volunteer for military service in the Vietnam War, emphasizing the financial benefits of serving in the military along with the importance of African-American citizens participating in the first integrated American army
- Hideki Yukawa, 74, Japanese theoretical physicist, in 1935, Yukawa published his theory of mesons, which explained the interaction between protons and neutrons, and was a major influence on research into elementary particles, he also worked on the theory of K-capture, in which a low-energy electron is absorbed by the nucleus

=== 9 ===
- Robert Askin, 74, Australian politician and alleged organised crime figure, he served as the Premier of New South Wales from 1965 until 1975,heart failure. There have been persistent allegations that Askin oversaw the creation of a lucrative network of corruption and bribery that involved politicians, public servants, police, and the nascent Sydney organised crime syndicates. Askin reportedly offered protection to the Sydney crime boss Abe Saffron and pressed him into service as "bagman" for Sydney's illegal liquor and prostitution rackets, and most illegal gambling activities. Saffron collected payoffs that were then passed to Askin and his associates.
- Jacques Lacan, 80, French psychoanalyst, psychiatrist and alleged charlatan,Lacan's phallocentric analysis is viewed as providing a useful means of understanding gender biases and imposed roles, Lacan was criticised for being aggressive with his clients, often physically hitting them, sometimes sleeping with them, (Note: In her biography, Roudinesco clarifies that this would happen "always away from the place where the analysis was taking place.") and charging "exorbitant amounts of money" for each session.

=== 11 ===
- Harold Bennett, 82, English actor, primarily remembered for roles in the sitcoms written and produced by David Croft, he portrayed the elderly, frail, miserly, and oversexed department store owner "Young" Mr. Grace in Are You Being Served? and Sidney Bluett in Dad's Army, the secret lover of Mrs Yeatman
- Frank McHugh, 83, American actor, he became a contract player for First National Pictures in 1930, he was a member of the clique of primarily Irish-American actors known as the "Irish Mafia"

=== 12 ===
- Eugenio Montale, Italian poet, prose writer, editor and translator, he was awarded the Nobel Prize in Literature in 1975

=== 14 ===
- Furry Lewis, 82 or 88, American country blues guitarist and songwriter, originally active in the 1920s, he came out of retirement during the American folk music revival of the 1960s, he opened twice for the Rolling Stones, performed on The Tonight Show Starring Johnny Carson, had a part in a Burt Reynolds feature film (W.W. and the Dixie Dancekings, 1975), and was profiled in Playboy magazine,heart failure, caused by pneumonia
- Charles L. Melson, 77, American naval officer, he held the rank of a vice admiral of the United States Navy, he served as the commander of the United States Taiwan Defense Command from 1962 until 1964

=== 15 ===
- Sara Haden, 82, American actress, she was a contract player for Metro-Goldwyn-Mayer (MGM) in the late 1930s, primarily known for portraying the spinster Aunt Milly Forrest in the film series Andy Hardy
- Rafael Méndez, 75, Mexican virtuoso solo trumpeter, he started his music career as a child, performing as a cornetist for the guerrilla leader Pancho Villa, he served as the leader of the brass instrument section in the studio orchestra of Metro-Goldwyn-Mayer (MGM)

=== 17 ===
- Milton Allen, 93, Saint Kitts and Nevis journalist and politician, he served as the governor of Saint Christopher, Nevis and Anguilla from 1969 until 1975
- Joyce Selznick, 56, American talent agent, casting director, and screenwriter, she worked as the eastern talent scout for Colpix Records,breast cancer

=== 18 ===
- Lyle Goodhue, 77, American inventor, research chemist, and entomologist, he started working on the concept of an aerosol propellant in 1929–1930, he is considered the "Father of the Aerosol Industry"

=== 21 ===
- Nigel Patrick, 69, English actor and stage director, in 1952, exhibitors voted Patrick as the seventh most popular British film star with the public in 1953, he was ranked as the ninth most popular British star, lung cancer

=== 22 ===
- Harry Warren, 87, American composer and songwriter, he wrote over 800 songs between 1918 and 1981, and he published over 500 of them, his songs eventually appeared in over 300 films and 112 of the Looney Tunes and Merrie Melodies cartoons by Warner Bros.

=== 23 ===
- Chief Dan George, 82. Canadian actor, musician, and poet, he served as the band chief of the Tsleil-Waututh Nation from 1951 until 1963, he received several honours for his role in the Revisionist Western film Little Big Man (1970), including a nomination for the Academy Award for Best Supporting Actor.

=== 24 ===
- Patsy Kelly, 71, Irish-American actress, her New York entertainment debut came as a member of a vaudeville chorus at age 12, she portrayed the wisecracking sidekick of Thelma Todd in a series of comedy shorts of the 1930s, and she was subsequently cast as a sidekick for both Pert Kelton and Lyda Roberti, Kelly's film career had stalled in the 1940s after being blackballed by the studios for outing herself as a lesbian, cancer

=== 26 ===
- Ray Kellogg, 61, American actor, he portrayed Deputy Ollie in the western television series The Life and Legend of Wyatt Earp
- Fred Trump Jr., 42, American airplane pilot and maintenance worker, he served in the Air National Guard as a second lieutenant,he worked as a pilot for the Trans World Airlines, heart attack caused by alcohol use (Note: His death certificate states that he died on September 29 of "natural causes".)

=== 27 ===
- Robert Montgomery, 77, American actor, film director, and film producer, he was twice nominated for the Academy Award for Best Actor for his roles in the films Night Must Fall (1937) and Here Comes Mr. Jordan (1941), a pioneering media consultant, Montgomery took an unpaid position as a consultant and coach to President Dwight D. Eisenhower in 1954, advising him on how to look his best on television and maintaining an office in the Eisenhower White House, cancer.

=== 28 ===
- Rómulo Betancourt, 73, Venezuelan politician, he served two terms as the president of Venezuela (1945–1948, 1959–1964), his Betancourt Doctrine denied Venezuelan diplomatic recognition to any regime, right-wing or left-wing, that came to power by military force, as he opposed the influence of military strongmen
- Edward Boyle, Baron Boyle of Handsworth, 58, British Conservative Party politician, he served as the Minister of Education from 1962 until 1964, the Shadow Home Secretary from 1964 until 1965, and the Shadow Secretary of State for Education and Science from 1965 until 1969,cancer

=== 29 ===
- Javad Fakoori, 45, Iranian military officer and politician, he served as the Minister of Defence from September 1980 until August 1981, he was one of the victims of the 1981 Iranian Air Force C-130 crash
- Valiollah Fallahi, 49–50, Iranian military officer, he served as the joint chief of staff from 1980 until 1981, one of the victims of the 1981 Iranian Air Force C-130 crash
- Mousa Namjoo, 42, Iranian military officer and politician, he briefly served as the Minister of Defence from August to September 1981, death in office, he was one of the victims of the 1981 Iranian Air Force C-130 crash
- Bill Shankly, 68, Scottish footballer, manager of Liverpool F.C. from 1959 until 1974,cardiac arrest.

=== 30 ===
- Yousef Kolahdouz, 34, Iranian general during the Iran–Iraq War, co-founder and deputy commander of the Islamic Revolutionary Guard Corps, former basketball player, one of the victims of the 1981 Iranian Air Force C-130 crash
- Cuckoo Moray, 52–53, Anglo-Indian dancer and actress, she was among the highest-paid dancers of the Indian cinema during the 1950s,cancer.

== Sources ==
- Blair, Gwenda (2015) [2000]. The Trumps: Three Generations of Builders and a Presidential Candidate. New York: Simon & Schuster. ISBN 978-1501139369.
- Fest, Joachim (1999), Speer: The Final Verdict, translated by Ewald Osers and Alexandra Dring, Harcourt, ISBN 978-0-15-100556-7
- Hancock, Ian (2006). Clune, David; Turner, Ken (eds.). The Premiers of New South Wales 1856–2005: Volume 2, 1901–2005. Sydney: Federation Press. pp. 347–372. ISBN 978-1-86287-551-7.
- Jaskot, Paul B. (2002). The Architecture of Oppression: The SS, Forced Labor and the Nazi Monumental Building Economy. London and New York: Taylor & Francis. ISBN 978-1-13459-462-7.
- Jordan, Anthony J. (1998). Christy Brown's Women: A Biography Drawing on His Letters. Westport Books. ISBN 978-0-9524447-3-2.
- Henderson, Anne (2008). Dame Enid Lyons: Leading Lady to a Nation. Pluto Press. ISBN 978-1925826050.
- Kelly, Stephen F. (1997). Bill Shankly: It's Much More Important Than That. London: Virgin Books. ISBN 0-7535-0003-5.
- Kolahdouz, Hamed (2011). مژه های سوخته [The burned eyelashes] (in Persian). Tehran: center of studies on holy defense. ISBN 978-600-5443-24-0.
- Pead, Brian (1986). Liverpool A Complete Record. Derby: Breedon Books Sport. ISBN 0-907969-15-1.
- Sereny, Gitta (1995), Albert Speer: His Battle with Truth, Knopf, ISBN 978-0-394-52915-8
- Trump, Mary L. (2020). Too Much and Never Enough. New York: Simon & Schuster. ISBN 978-1-9821-4146-2. OCLC 1164093746.
- van der Vat, Dan (1997), The Good Nazi: The Life and Lies of Albert Speer, Internet Archive, George Weidenfeld & Nicolson, ISBN 978-0-297-81721-5 – via Internet Archive
