= Ali Sayad Shirazi =

Iranian military general (1944–1999)

Timsar Ali Sayyad Shirazi
- علی صیاد شیرازی
- Shirazi pictured during the Iran–Iraq War

Head of the War Studies Board
- In office 1995 – 10 April 1999
- President: Akbar Hashemi Rafsanjani; Mohammad Khatami
- Supreme Leader: Ali Khamenei
- Preceded by: Office Established
- Succeeded by: Nasser Arasteh

Deputy Chief of the General Staff
- In office 11 September 1993 – 10 April 1999
- President: Akbar Hashemi Rafsanjani; Mohammad Khatami
- Prime Minister: Mir-Hossein Mousavi
- Supreme Leader: Ali Khamenei
- Preceded by: Mohammad Forouzandeh
- Succeeded by: Gholam Ali Rashid

Deputy Chief of Inspection of the General Staff of the Armed Forces
- In office 1989 – 10 April 1999
- President: Ali Khamenei
- Prime Minister: Mir-Hossein Mousavi
- Supreme Leader: Ruhollah Khomeini; Ali Khamenei
- Preceded by: Office Established
- Succeeded by: Hedayat Lotfian

Representative of the Supreme Leader in the Supreme National Security Council
- In office 1986–1989
- President: Ali Khamenei; Akbar Hashemi Rafsanjani
- Prime Minister: Mir-Hossein Mousavi
- Supreme Leader: Ruhollah Khomeini; Ali Khamenei
- Preceded by: Qasem-Ali Zahirnejad
- Succeeded by: Hassan Rouhani

Commander of the Ground Force
- In office 1 October 1981 – 2 August 1986
- President: Mohammad-Ali Rajai; Ali Khamenei
- Prime Minister: Mohammad-Reza Mahdavi Kani; Mir-Hossein Mousavi
- Supreme Leader: Ruhollah Khomeini
- Preceded by: Qasem-Ali Zahirnejad
- Succeeded by: Hossein Hassani Sa'di

Director of Imam Ali Officers' Academy
- In office 1981–?
- President: Mohammad-Ali Rajai; Ali Khamenei
- Prime Minister: Mohammad-Javad Bahonar; Mohammad-Reza Mahdavi Kani; Mir-Hossein Mousavi
- Supreme Leader: Ruhollah Khomeini
- Preceded by: Mousa Namjoo
- Succeeded by: Hossein Hatami

Personal details
- Born: 13 June 1944 Kaboudgonbad, Khorasan, Pahlavi Iran
- Died: 10 April 1999 (aged 54) Tehran, Iran
- Cause of death: Assassination
- Resting place: Mausoleum of Ruhollah Khomeini
- Education: Officers' Academy
- Awards: Order of Fath (two 1st Classes)
- Nickname: Butcher of Kurdistan

Military service
- Allegiance: Pahlavi Iran (1964–1979); Iran (1979–1999)
- Branch/service: Ground Forces
- Years of service: 1964–1999
- Rank: Major General; Lieutenant General (posthumously)
- Commands: Western Regional Headquarters (1980); Northwestern Regional Headquarters (1981)
- Battles/wars: 1979 Kurdish rebellion in Iran; Iran–Iraq War; Operation Fath ol-Mobin; Operation Beit ol-Moqaddas; Second Battle of Khorramshahr; Operation Ramadan; Operation Zafar 7; Operation Nasr 4; Operation Mersad; KDPI insurgency (1989–1996)

Ali Sayyad Shirazi (Persian: علی صیاد شیرازی, 13 June 1944 – 10 April 1999) was an Iranian military officer. He was a key military commander of the Iranian Ground Forces during the Iran–Iraq War. Shirazi was assassinated by Mojahedin-e Khalq in 1999 while serving as the deputy chief of the Iranian Armed Forces General Staff.

== Early life ==
Shirazi was born in Dargaz, Kabud Gonbad Rural District, Iran, on 13 June 1944. He was of Afshar descent, and his ancestors were from Estahban and Neyriz in Fars province. His grandfather, originally from Khorasan, settled in Dargaz. Shortly after his birth, his family moved to Mashhad, where they lived for two years, and later moved to the region of Mazandaran, living in the cities of Gorgan, Amol and Gonbad-e Kavus. He graduated from Amirkabir High School in Tehran. His father, being a non-commissioned officer in the Iranian military, inspired and motivated him to join the army, and in 1964 he joined as a cadet.

== Career ==
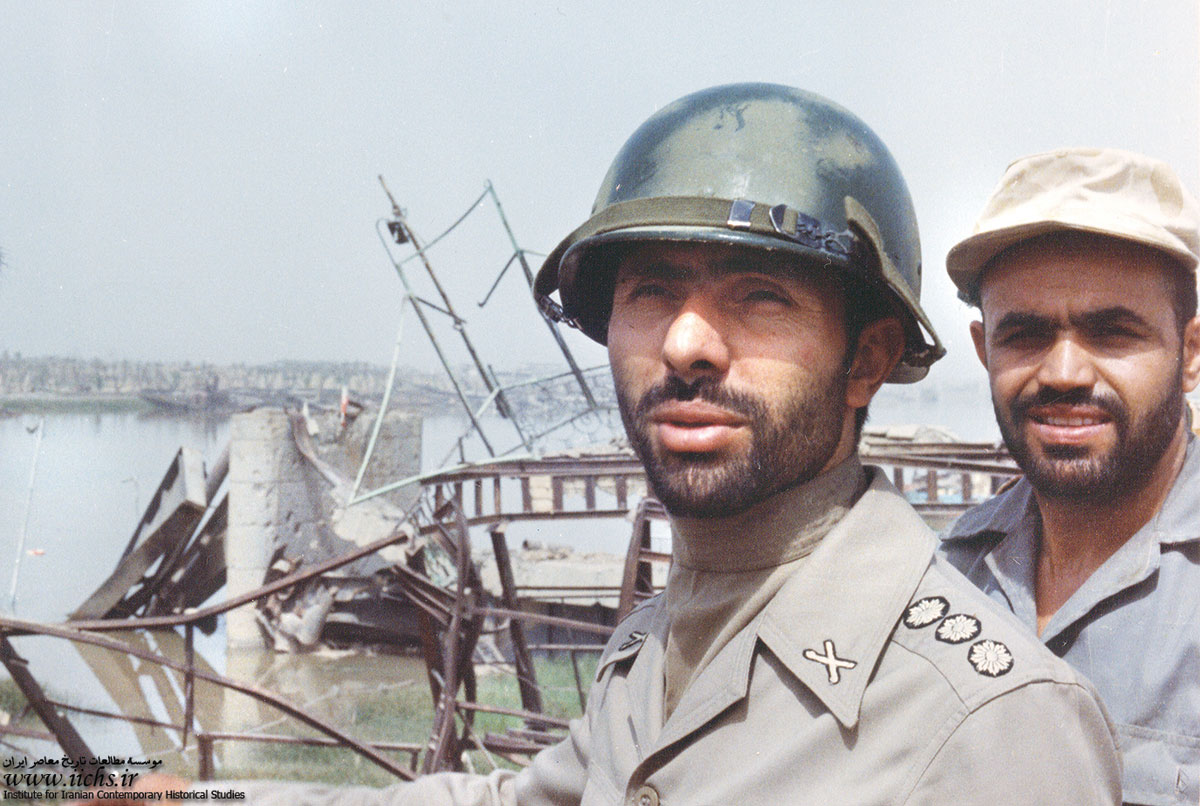
Ali Sayad Shirazi following the Liberation of Khorramshahr in May 1982

Shirazi was commissioned as a second lieutenant in the artillery and in 1974, he was sent to the United States for further military education. When he returned to Iran he showed opposition to the policies of the Pahlavi government and participated in some street demonstrations. He then joined the opposition movement against the Shah after the 1978 Qom protest. During the Iranian revolution, he served in the 64th Infantry Division in Urmia, in northwestern Iran. He was later awarded the rank of lieutenant general.

During the Iran–Iraq War, Shirazi became one of the most important generals of Iran. In 1981, his role in Kurdistan led him to be appointed him commander of the Iranian Army. In 1982, he led the Iranian Revolutionary Guards and Basij paramilitaries to victory in Operation Undeniable Victory. This was the first time Iran was able to defeat Iraq in a major battle, as Iranian forces broke through Iraq's "impenetrable" defense lines and expelled Iraqi forces from the Dezful-Shush area. This operation is considered by many as the turning point in the war. After the bulk of Iraqi forces in Iranian Kurdistan had retreated, Shirazi led several devastating attacks on KDPI bases. The MEK, which had established a presence there, was also defeated. By the end of June 1983, he had cleared Iranian Kurdistan and prepared to cross the border.

In 1986, he was named member of the Supreme Defense Council. However, three weeks after this appointment Shirazi was relieved of his post as commander of the ground forces.

In July 1988, the People's Mujahedin of Iran (MEK) attempted to topple Khomeini's government by advancing its National Liberation Army in Kermanshah. The IRP's counter offensive, Operation Mersad (led by Shirazi), defeated MEK forces. He also led other successful military operations against Iraq, such as, Operation Zafar 7; and Operation Nasr-4. In 1989, Shirazi was awarded the highest military distinction in the Iranian armed forces, the Fath (Conquest) medal.

When the war concluded, Shirazi was not promoted to major general (unlike his counterparts), but was instead given various staff assignments.

=== Controversy ===
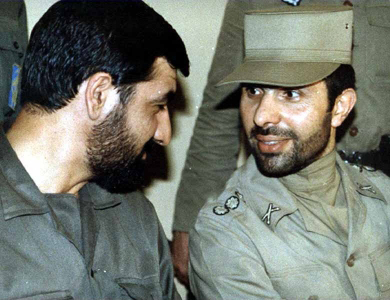
Ali Sayad Shirazi (right) with Mohsen Rezaee (left), pictured sometime in the mid-1980s

Ali Sayyad Shirazi (with Mohsen Rezaee, and Ali Akbar Hashemi Rafsanjani) was seen as among "the most hawkish of Iran’s military and civilian leaders, and those who most clearly advocated for continuing the war into Iraq."

In July 1986, Shirazi and Mohsen Rezaee, the commander of the IRGC at the time, clashed "violently" over what policy and military strategy should be adopted in the Iran–Iraq War. When this rivalry became public, the supreme leader met them in his residence on 19 July 1986 and urged them to "seek unity", telling them "You must endeavor, not to think in terms of being members of the Armed Forces or those of the Guards Corps or of the Basij forces. ... We must understand that if there were to be any disputes among you ... not only are we doomed here and now, but we also are guilty before God." Both Shirazi and Rezaie were appointed to the Supreme Defense Council; however, within three weeks, Shirazi was dismissed from his position as commander of the ground forces, while Rezaie maintained his operational command responsibilities.

== Assassination ==
On 10 April 1999, 6:45 local time, Shirazi was assassinated outside his house while on his way to work by an assailant from MEK. His assassin was disguised as a street sweeper. Ali Khamenei issued a message on Shirazi's martyrdom. A MEK spokesman said that Shirazi had been targeted because of "purging and executing military personnel and for the deaths of hundreds of thousands of child soldiers during the Iran–Iraq War, in which he commanded Iran's ground forces."

== Legacy ==
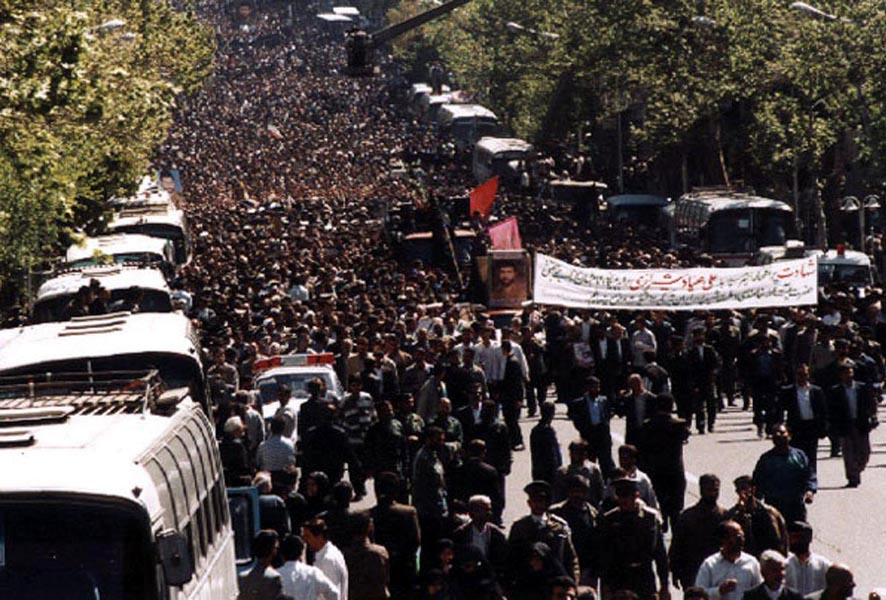
Funeral of General Ali Sayad Shirazi

Thousands of people attended his state funeral. Shirazi has had several streets, buildings and military complexes named after him, including a subway station and a highway in Tehran.

== See also ==
- List of Iranian two-star generals since 1979
- Sayad (2025 film)

Military offices
Preceded by vacant	Commandaner of Western Regional Headquarters; 1980	Succeeded by Houshang Attarian
Preceded by vacant	Commandaner of Northwestern Regional Headquarters; 1981	Succeeded by Hassan Abshenasan
Preceded by Mousa Namjoo	Commandant of Imam Ali Officers' Academy; 1981–?	Succeeded by Hossein Hatami
Preceded by Qasem-Ali Zahirnejad	Commander of the Islamic Republic of Iran Army Ground Forces; 1 October 1981–2 August 1986	Succeeded by Hossein Hassani Sa'di
New title	Vice Chief of the General Staff of Iranian Armed Forces for Inspection; 1989–10 April 1999	Vacant Title next held by Hedayat Lotfian
Preceded by Mohammad Forouzandeh	Deputy Chief of the General Staff of Iranian Armed Forces; 11 September 1993–10 April 1999	Succeeded by Gholam Ali Rashid
New title	Head of the War Studies Board; 1995–10 April 1999	Succeeded by Nasser Arasteh
Political offices
Preceded by Qasem-Ali Zahirnejad	Supreme Leader's Representative at Supreme National Defence Council; 1986–1989; With: Mohsen Rafighdoost	Succeeded by Hassan Rouhani
