= Qasem-Ali Zahirnejad =

Iranian military officer (1924–1999)

Timsar Qasem-Ali Zahirnejad
- قاسمعلی ظهیرنژاد
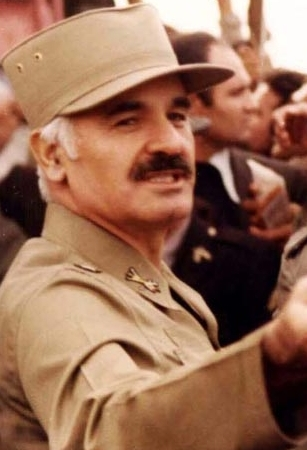
- Zahirnejad c. 1981

Head of the Military Advisory Group to the Commander-in-Chief of the Armed Forces
- In office 6 November 1989 – 13 October 1999
- President: Akbar Hashemi Rafsanjani; Mohammad Khatami
- Supreme Leader: Ruhollah Khomeini
- Preceded by: Office Established
- Succeeded by: Mohammad Salimi

Representative of the Supreme Leader in the Supreme National Security Council
- In office 1984–1986
- President: Ali Khamenei
- Prime Minister: Mir-Hossein Mousavi
- Supreme Leader: Ruhollah Khomeini
- Preceded by: Vacant
- Succeeded by: Ali Sayad Shirazi

Deputy Commander-in-Chief of the Armed Forces
- In office 1 October 1981 – ?
- President: Temporary Presidential Council; Ali Khamenei
- Prime Minister: Mir-Hossein Mousavi
- Supreme Leader: Ruhollah Khomeini
- Preceded by: Valiollah Fallahi
- Succeeded by: ?

Chief of the Joint Staff
- In office 1 October 1981 – 25 October 1984
- President: Temporary Presidential Council; Ali Khamenei
- Prime Minister: Mir-Hossein Mousavi
- Supreme Leader: Ruhollah Khomeini
- Preceded by: Valiollah Fallahi
- Succeeded by: Esmaeil Sohrabi

Commander of the Ground Force
- In office 19 June 1980 – 1 October 1981
- President: Abolhassan Banisadr; Temporary Presidential Council; Mohammad-Ali Rajai; Temporary Presidential Council
- Prime Minister: Interim Government of Iran (1979–80); Mohammad-Ali Rajai; Mohammad-Javad Bahonar; Mohammad-Reza Mahdavi Kani
- Supreme Leader: Ruhollah Khomeini
- Preceded by: Valiollah Fallahi
- Succeeded by: Ali Sayad Shirazi

Commander of the Gendarmerie
- In office 16 March 1980 – September 1980
- President: Abolhassan Banisadr
- Prime Minister: Interim Government of Iran (1979–80); Mohammad-Ali Rajai
- Supreme Leader: Ruhollah Khomeini
- Preceded by: Elias Daneshvar
- Succeeded by: Hassanali Forouzan

Personal details
- Born: 9 October 1924 Ardabil, Qajar Iran
- Died: 13 October 1999 (aged 75) Tehran, Iran
- Education: Officers' Academy
- Awards: Order of Nasr

Military service
- Allegiance: Pahlavi Iran; Iran
- Branch/service: Ground Forces
- Years of service: 1951–1973; 1979–1999
- Rank: Lieutenant Colonel Major General
- Commands: 64th Infantry Division (1979)
- Battles/wars: 1979 Kurdish rebellion in Iran; Iran–Iraq War; KDPI insurgency (1989–1996)

Qasem-Ali Zahirnejad (Persian: قاسمعلی ظهیرنژاد; 9 October 1924 – 13 October 1999) was an Iranian military officer.

== Biography ==
Qasem-Ali Zahirnejad Ershadi was born in 1924 in the city of Ardabil. Zahirnejad began his studies in the Officers' School in 1951. After graduation, he began his career in the Imperial Iranian Army in 1954 with the rank of Second Lieutenant in the 7th Division of Urmia. He retired from the army in 1973 with the rank of Lieutenant Colonel. He returned following the Iranian Revolution in 1979 to prevent a rebellion in Kurdistan and was promoted to Colonel, becoming the commander of 64th Infantry Division. In 1980, Zahirnejad was promoted to Brigadier General, leading the gendarmerie, before being promoted a year later to the position of Chief of the Joint Staff. Throughout the Iran–Iraq War, his insistence on regular military commanders and conventional tactics led to clashes with the Iranian Revolutionary Guard Corps (IRGC).

from 1984 to 1986, he served as the Representative of the Supreme Leader in the Supreme National Security Council.

Zahirnejad retired on 6 November 1989 with the rank of Major General and then he led the Military Advisory Group to the Commander-in-Chief of the Armed Forces from 1989 until 1999. He died of a stroke in Tehran on 13 October 1999.

== See also ==
- List of Iranian two-star generals since 1979

Military offices
New title	Head of the Military Advisory Group to the Commander-in-Chief of the Armed Forces; 6 November 1989–13 October 1999	Succeeded by Mohammad Salimi
Preceded by Valiollah Fallahi	Chief of the Joint Staff of the Islamic Republic of Iran Army; 1 October 1981–25 October 1984	Succeeded by Esmaeil Sohrabi
Preceded by Valiollah Fallahi	Commander of the Islamic Republic of Iran Ground Forces; 19 June 1980–1 October 1981	Succeeded by Ali Sayad Shirazi
Preceded by Valiollah Fallahi	Deputy Commander-in-Chief of the Iranian Armed Forces; 1 October 1981–?	Succeeded by ?
Preceded by Elias Daneshvar	Commander of the Gendarmerie; 16 March 1980–September 1980	Succeeded by Hassanali Forouzan
Preceded by Farhang Kowsar	Commander of the 64th Infantry Division; 1979	Succeeded by Mohammad Zaki Zakiani
Government offices
Preceded by Vacant last held by Mousa Namjoo	Supreme Leader's Representative at Supreme National Defence Council; 1984–1986; With: Akbar Hashemi Rafsanjani	Succeeded by Ali Sayad Shirazi
