= 1981 Iranian Air Force C-130 crash =

Aviation crash in Iran

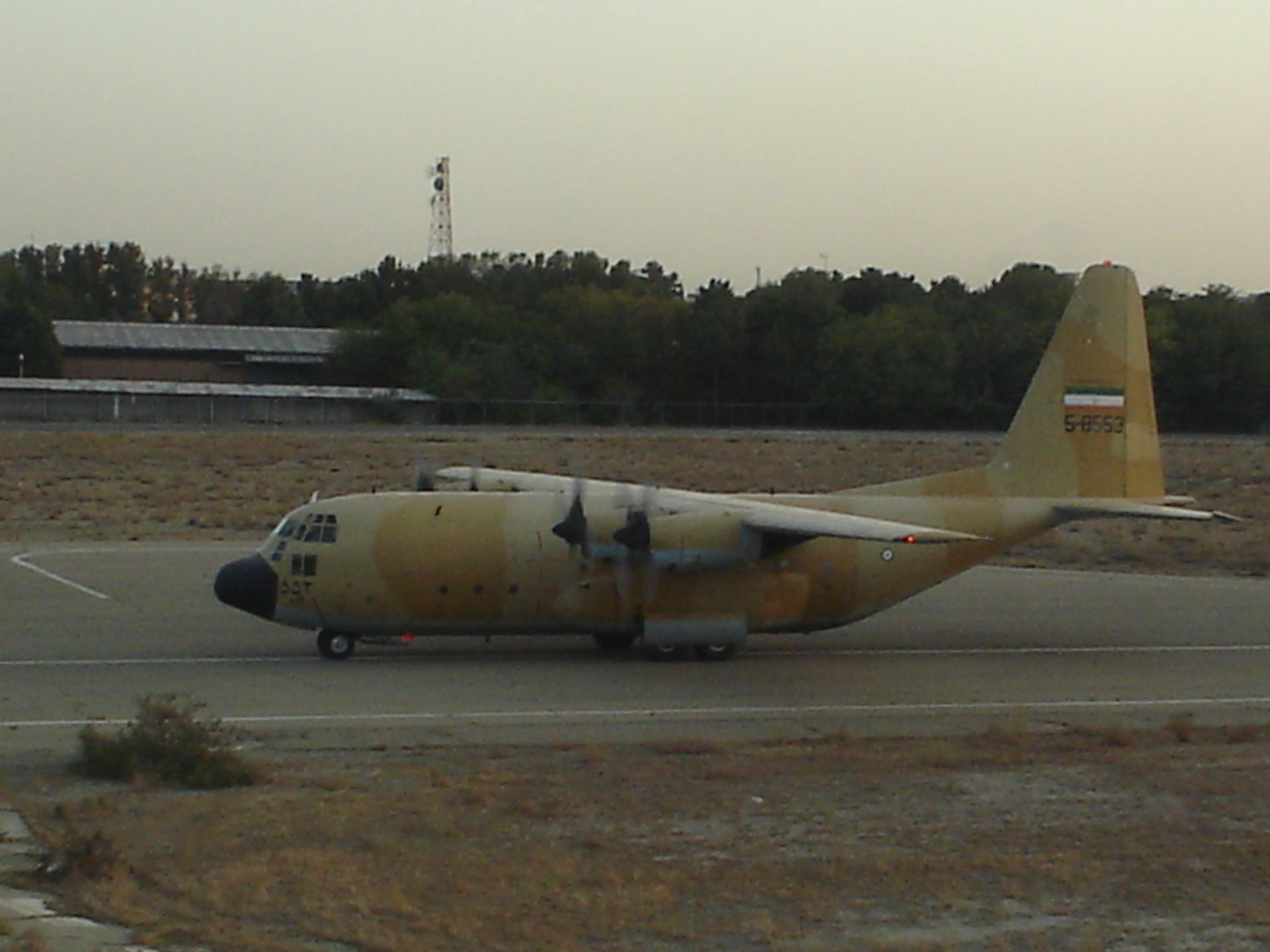
- An Iranian Air Force C-130E Hercules similar to the aircraft that crashed

Crash
- Date: 29 September 1981
- Summary: Crashed into structure
- Site: Firing range near Kahrizak, Iran
- Total fatalities: 80

Aircraft
- Aircraft type: Lockheed C-130 Hercules
- Operator: Iranian Air Force
- Registration: 5-8552
- Flight origin: Ahvaz, Khuzestan province
- Destination: Tehran
- Occupants: 60
- Fatalities: 60
- Survivors: 0

Ground casualties
- Ground fatalities: 20

On 29 September 1981, an Iranian Air Force C-130 military cargo aircraft crashed into a firing range near Kahrizak, Iran. The plane was flying from Ahvaz, Khuzestan province to Tehran, while returning from an inspection tour of Iranian military gains in the Iran–Iraq War.

The crash killed 80 people, including former Defence Minister Javad Fakoori, then-Defence Minister Mousa Namjoo, then-Chief-of-Staff of the Army Valiollah Fallahi, and then-commander of the Islamic Revolutionary Guard Corps Mohammad Jahanara.

== Background ==
In order to break the Siege of Abadan, the Operation Samen-ol-A'emeh was performed from 27 to 29 September 1981. To transfer the report of the Operation Samen-ol-A'emeh to Tehran, it was decided that several Iranian military leaders were to return to Tehran by a Lockheed C-130 Hercules aircraft.

== Crash ==
At 19:00 local time (15:30 UTC) on 29 September 1981, the C-130 cargo aircraft crashed into a firing range near Kahrizak, Iran. The plane was flying from Ahvaz in southwestern Khuzestan province to Tehran, while returning from an inspection tour of Iranian military gains in the Iran–Iraq War.

=== Casualties ===
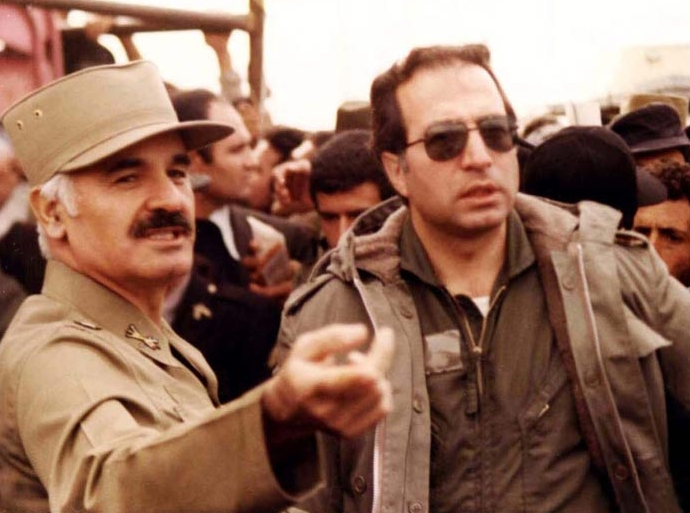
Former Defence Minister and Air Force commander Javad Fakoori

The crash killed all 60 people on board, including former Defence Minister Javad Fakoori, then-Defence Minister Mousa Namjoo, Iranian General Valiollah Fallahi, and then-commander of the Islamic Revolutionary Guard Corps Mohammad Jahanara. The four had played vital roles in the Iran–Iraq War, and the plane was carrying casualties of the war. The crash also killed 20 on the ground, bringing the death toll to 80.

Initially, there was no official explanation for what caused the crash. The crash caused Iran to lose several military leaders, who were trying to break the Siege of Abadan. An undetermined number of Iranians who were wounded from the war were also in the plane.

== Causes ==
There was no official explanation given for reasons of the crash, and just one source called it the result of a "technical fault". On the other hand, in a speech following the incident Ayatollah Ruhollah Khomeini made a reference to Mujahedeen Khalq as the perpetrator without clearly condemning the leftist group.

== See also ==
- Aviation accidents and incidents
- Iran–Iraq relations
- Transport in Iran
