= Assassination of Ali Sayyad Shirazi =

1999 Iranian political killing by the MEK

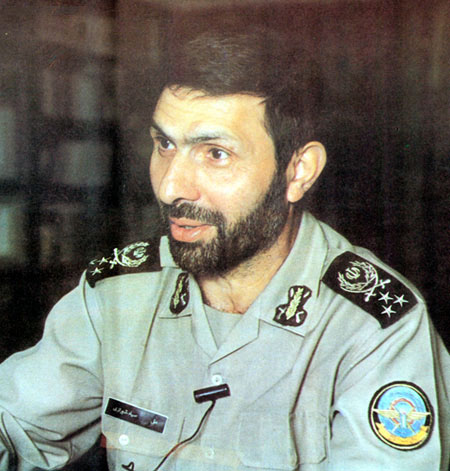
- Ali Sayyad Shirazi
- Location: Tehran, Iran
- Date: April 10, 1999; 27 years ago 6:45 a.m. local time
- Target: Ali Sayyad Shirazi
- Attack type: Assassination by gunshot
- Deaths: Ali Sayyad Shirazi
- Perpetrator: Mojahedin-e Khalq (claimed responsibility)

On 10 April 1999, 6:45 a.m local time, Ali Sayyad Shirazi, the deputy chief of staff of the Iranian Armed Forces, was assassinated while leaving his home for work. He was killed by an Mojahedin-e Khalq (MEK) assailant, an Iranian opposition group, who was disguised as a street cleaner and handed Shirazi a letter just before shooting him.

== Background ==
There had been several attacks on senior officials in Iran in the months before Sayyad Shirazi's assassination, among them a senior judge, Ali Razini, the head of Iran's largest charity organisation, and Mohsen Rafighdoost, who were injured during separate assassination attempts. According to a spokesman for Mojahedin-e Khalq, an Iranian opposition group which advocates the end of Iran's government and adheres to marxism durning the iranian revolution several of the group's units had carried out the killings in northern Tehran. Mojahedin-e Khalq claimed the responsibility for the assassination of Asadollah Lajevardi, a former Iranian chief prosecutor and head of Iran's Prisons Organization, who was assassinated on 23 August 1998.

Ali Sayyad Shirazi had personally commanded several of Iran's major offensives in the Iran–Iraq War, earning him the nickname "Iron Man".

== Assassination ==
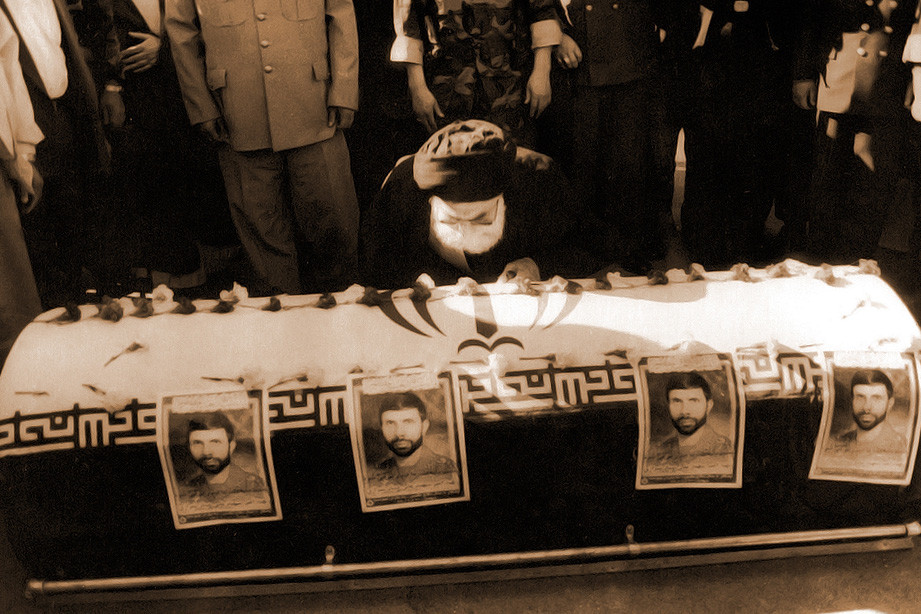
Ayatollah Ali Khamenei showing respect to Sayyad Shirazi's coffin

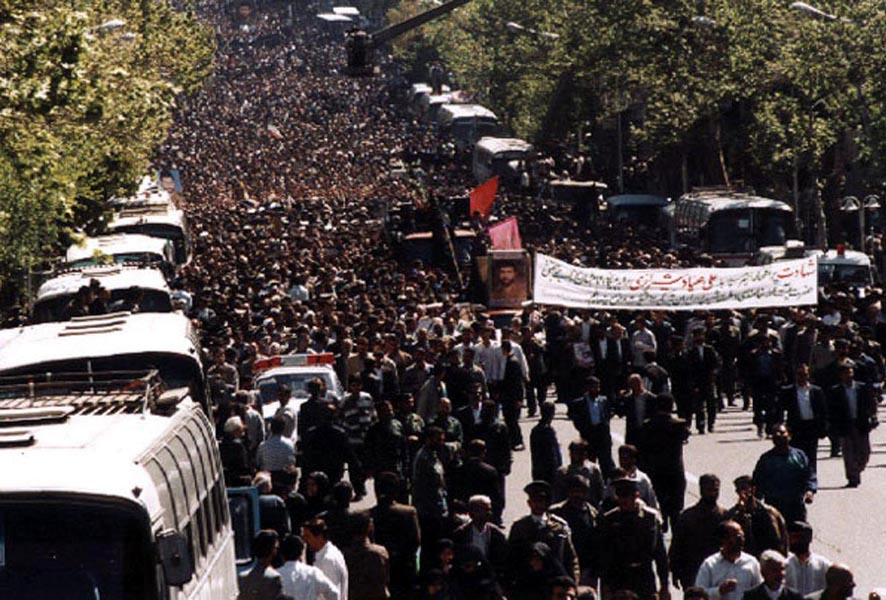
Funeral of Sayyad Shirazi in Tehran

Ali Sayyad Shirazi was fatally shot by an unknown assailant while leaving home for work. He was taken to Farhang hospital where he was pronounced dead at 54. The assailant was disguised as a municipality street sweeper. According to witnesses, Sayyad Shirazi received three bullets. His son, Mahdi, who was present at the assassination scene, described the incident:

" On the terror day, me and my brother were ready for going to school and our father were supposed to take us there...I opened the parking door and my father drove the car out of the parking lot at 6:30 a.m and waited for my brother to join us. I was closing the parking door when I witnessed a masked man wearing the orange clothes of the municipality street sweepers approach my father while sweeping the street and hand a letter to him. When my father began reading the letter, the guy pulled out the gun he was hiding under his clothes and fired four bullets at my father's head. The assassin then ran away to the alley located before ours; then I heard a motorbike, hence he was not alone most probably."

Shirazi was assassinated in retribution for his role in Operation Mersad during the Iran-Iraq War, where the MEK forces were defeated by Iranian forces under his command. According to Rahim Safavi, commenting 11 years after Sayyad Shirazi's death, the assassination operation was allegedly carried out at Saddam Hussein's order.

A MEK spokesman said that Shirazi had been targeted because for "purging and executing military personnel and for the deaths of hundreds of thousands of child soldiers during the Iran-Iraq War, when he commanded Iran's ground forces."

=== Perpetrator ===
Shahin Gobadi, the spokesman for MEK in Paris, told the Associated Press in Cairo via a telephone call that "the group's units inside Iran were responsible for the killing." Zahra Ghaemi was described by the Iranian media as being in the charge of the assassination team.

=== Aftermath ===
Shirazi's funeral was held the day after his assassination. Iranian supreme leader, Ali Khamenei, was present at Shirazi's funeral. According to Shirazi's son, Mahdi, the assassination file was being prosecuted by a court in France, and he was summoned in 2009 by the court to detail the incident.
