= Ali Shamkhani =

Iranian naval officer and politician (1955–2026)

Amir Ali Shamkhani
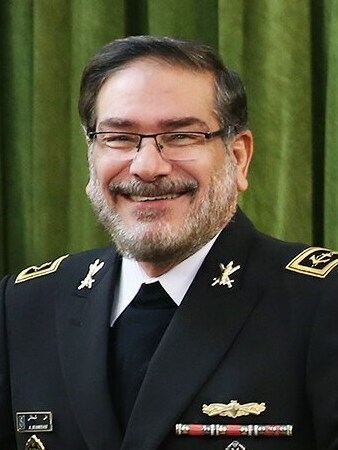
- Shamkhami in 2016

Member of Expediency Discernment Council
- In office 22 May 2023 – 28 February 2026
- Appointed by: Ali Khamenei
- President: Ebrahim Raisi; Mohammad Mokhber (acting); Masoud Pezeshkian
- Supreme Leader: Ali Khamenei
- Chairman: Sadiq Larijani

4th Secretary of the Supreme National Security Council
- In office 10 September 2013 – 22 May 2023
- President: Hassan Rouhani Ebrahim Raisi
- Supreme Leader: Ali Khamenei
- Preceded by: Saeed Jalili
- Succeeded by: Ali Akbar Ahmadian

Minister of Defence and Armed Forces Logistics
- In office 20 August 1997 – 24 August 2005
- President: Mohammad Khatami
- Supreme Leader: Ali Khamenei
- Preceded by: Mohammad Forouzandeh
- Succeeded by: Mostafa Mohammad-Najjar

Commander of the IRGC Navy
- In office 23 December 1990 – 27 August 1997
- President: Akbar Hashemi Rafsanjani; Mohammad Khatami
- Supreme Leader: Ali Khamenei
- Preceded by: Hossein Alaei
- Succeeded by: Ali Akbar Ahmadian

Commander of the Artesh Navy
- In office 30 October 1989 – 27 August 1997
- President: Akbar Hashemi Rafsanjani; Mohammad Khatami
- Supreme Leader: Ali Khamenei
- Preceded by: Mohammad-Hossein Malekzadegan
- Succeeded by: Abbas Mohtaj

Minister of Revolutionary Guards
- In office 20 September 1988 – 21 August 1989
- President: Ali Khamenei; Akbar Hashemi Rafsanjani
- Prime Minister: Mir-Hossein Mousavi
- Supreme Leader: Ruhollah Khomeini; Ali Khamenei
- Preceded by: Mahmoud Pakravan (acting); Mohsen Rafighdoost
- Succeeded by: Ministry dissolved

Deputy for Intelligence and Operations of the General Staff
- In office 1988–1989
- President: Ali Khamenei
- Prime Minister: Mir-Hossein Mousavi
- Supreme Leader: Ruhollah Khomeini
- Preceded by: Office Established
- Succeeded by: Gholam Ali Rashid

Commander of the IRGC Ground Forces
- In office 30 April 1986 – 20 September 1988
- President: Ali Khamenei
- Prime Minister: Mir-Hossein Mousavi
- Supreme Leader: Ruhollah Khomeini
- Preceded by: Yahya Rahim Safavi
- Succeeded by: Yahya Rahim Safavi

Deputy Commander of the Islamic Revolutionary Guard Corps
- In office June 1982 – 24 September 1989
- President: Ali Khamenei
- Prime Minister: Mir-Hossein Mousavi
- Supreme Leader: Ruhollah Khomeini
- Preceded by: Yousef Kolahdouz
- Succeeded by: Yahya Rahim Safavi

Personal details
- Born: 29 September 1955 Ahvaz, Pahlavi Iran
- Died: 28 February 2026 (aged 70) Tehran, Iran
- Cause of death: Assassination by airstrike
- Resting place: Imamzadeh Saleh
- Party: Mojahedin of the Islamic Revolution Organisation (1979–1981)
- Spouse: Azarmidokht Tabatabaei
- Children: 5, including Hossein
- Education: Shahid Chamran University of Ahvaz
- Awards: Order of Fath (3); Order of King Abdulaziz

Military service
- Allegiance: Iran
- Branch/service: Islamic Revolutionary Guard Corps; Islamic Republic of Iran Navy
- Years of service: 1981–2026
- Rank: Rear Admiral; Vice Admiral (posthumously)
- Unit: Navy
- Commands: Commander of the IRGC in Khuzestan province (1979–1981)
- Battles/wars: Iran–Iraq War; KDPI insurgency (1989–1996); War in Afghanistan (2001–2021); 2001 uprising in Herat; Insurgency in Sistan and Balochistan; Syrian civil war; Iranian intervention in Syria; War in Iraq (2013–2017); Iranian intervention in Iraq; Iran–PJAK conflict; Western Iran clashes; 2019–2021 Persian Gulf crisis; 2024 Iran–Israel conflict; Twelve-Day War (WIA); 2026 Iran war X

Ali Shamkhani (Note: Persian: علی شمخانی, romanized: ʿAlī Shamkhānī; Arabic: علي شمخاني) (29 September 1955 – 28 February 2026) was an Iranian naval officer and politician who served as the secretary of the Supreme National Security Council of Iran from 2013 to 2023. He had previously served as commander of both the IRGC Navy and the Artesh Navy. Shamkhani was a member of the Expediency Discernment Council of Iran and political advisor of the supreme leader of Iran from 2023. He was also one of the political appointees overseeing the Iran–United States negotiations aimed at reaching a nuclear peace agreement.

In June 2025, Shamkhani was severely injured in an Israeli airstrike during the Twelve-Day War. Initial reports mistakenly claimed he had been killed, but he later reappeared in public. However, Shamkhani was killed eight months later in February 2026, during the 2026 Iran war.

== Early life and education ==
Shamkhani was born on 29 September 1955 in Ahvaz, Khuzestan, Iran. His family is of Iranian Arab origin. After completing high school, Shamkhani's family relocated to Los Angeles in the United States, where his two brothers remained, one pursuing studies in medicine and the other in mechanical engineering. Shamkhani, however, returned to Iran, citing cultural reasons for his decision, and studied engineering at Shahid Chamran University of Ahvaz. While at college, before the Iranian Revolution, Shamkhani was member of a clandestine Islamist guerilla group named Mansouroun (lit. 'The Victors'), engaging in armed struggle against the Pahlavi dynasty. After the revolution, he joined the Islamist Mojahedin of the Islamic Revolution Organisation.

== Career ==
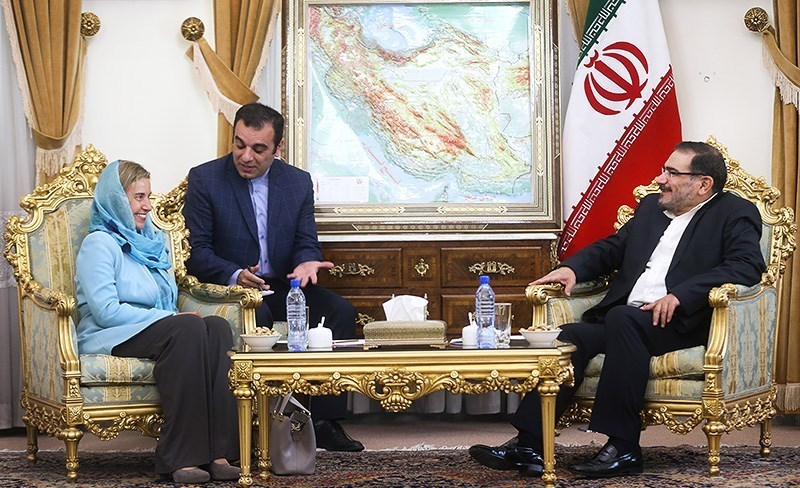
Shamkhani next to EU Foreign Policy chief Federica Mogherini in 2016

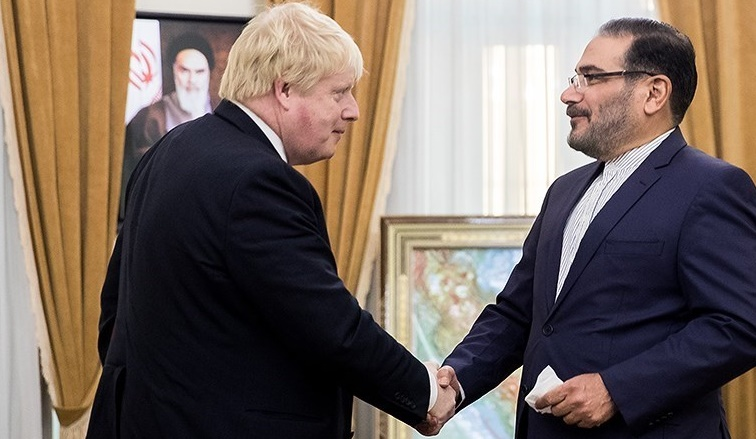
Shamkhani with then-UK Foreign Secretary Boris Johnson on 10 May 2017

Shamkhani served as commander of the Islamic Revolutionary Guard Corps Navy with the rank of rear admiral and later also commanded the Islamic Republic of Iran Navy, overseeing both naval forces simultaneously for eight years after the Iran–Iraq War, during which he had been deputy commander-in-chief of the IRGC. He was appointed the Minister of Revolutionary Guards in 1988.

He held the post of the Minister of defence and Armed Forces Logistics from August 1997 until August 2005 in the government of Mohammad Khatami. Shamkhani was replaced by Mostafa Mohammad-Najjar in the post. Shamkhani also ran for office in the 2001 Iranian presidential elections, coming in third.

He was the director of the Iranian think tank Center for Strategic Studies from 2005 to 2013. He was also military advisor to the supreme leader of Iran, Ayatollah Ali Khamenei.

On 10 September 2013, Shamkhani was appointed secretary of the Supreme National Security Council (SNSC) by president Hassan Rouhani, a position that he held for nearly 10 years until May 2023. During his time in the SNSC, he was known for his critical stance on the Iran nuclear deal, with reports indicating he opposed efforts to revive the agreement between Iran and the United States.

After the US airstrike on 3 January 2020 killed the head of IRGC's Quds Force Qasem Soleimani as he travelled in Baghdad, Iraq, Shamkhani said on 6 January that Iran's response would be a "historic nightmare" for the US: "Even if the weakest of these scenarios gains a consensus, the implementation of it can be a historic nightmare for the Americans... The entirety of the resistance forces will retaliate," he said to the Fars News Agency. The SNSC was assessing 13 revenge scenarios.

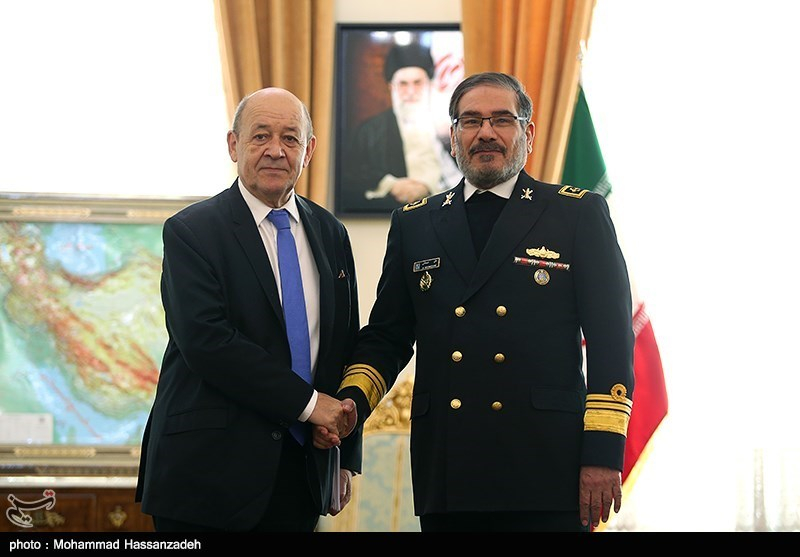
Shamkhani with French Foreign Minister Jean-Yves Le Drian on 5 March 2018

At a Baghdad news conference after meeting with Iraqi politicians on 7 March 2020, Shamkhani said "Zionists are against regional security."

Shamkhani resigned as the country's top security official in May 2023. The New York Times disclosed that the Iranian government removed Shamkhani from his position as a national security official following scrutiny over his close ties with a senior British spy. Speculation about his departure arose in January after his former ally, Iranian-British politician and military officer Alireza Akbari, was executed for espionage on behalf of the UK. Iran International claimed that Shamkhani was forced to resign after his involvement as a key member of the government circle linked to Naji Sharifi-Zindashti, who allegedly headed a cartel engaged in kidnapping and drug trafficking in collaboration with the IRGC, was made public.

In 2025, Shamkhani was overseeing the Iran–United States negotiations aimed at reaching a nuclear peace agreement. Following the Twelve-Day War, he became the secretary of the Iranian Defence Council.

On 28 February 2026, he was killed during the 2026 Iran war in targeted strikes on the Iranian Defense Council meeting.

== Views ==
Shamkhani was a vocal critic and opponent of the JCPOA, and as the Secretary of the Supreme National Security Council he was reported to have blocked the revival of the nuclear agreement in 2020. Reports suggest that his opposition to the agreement stemmed from his family's stake in the Admiral Shipping Company, which profited from bypassing Western sanctions that the deal would have lifted.

He was also quoted as promoting Iranian development of nuclear weapons, as in an October 2025 interview he stated "If I returned to the defence portfolio, I would move toward building an atomic bomb", and declared that if he could return to the 1990s, "we would definitely build the atomic bomb".

== Controversies ==
On 30 July 2020, the US Department of the Treasury announced a sweeping Iran-related sanctions action targeting the Admiral global shipping network, believed to have been founded by Ali Shamkhani—the name referring to his rank of rear admiral, and controlled by his sons, Mohammad Hossein and Hassan. According to the Treasury report, Ali Shamkhani took advantage of his political influence at the highest levels of the Iranian regime and through corrupt practices assisted his sons in building and operating a fleet of tankers and containerships moving Iranian and Russian petroleum and other cargo worldwide, shipments allegedly included Iranian missiles, drone parts and other military goods, sent to Russia in exchange for petroleum. The network, comprising front companies, ship managers, and frequently reflagged vessels, controls a "significant portion of Iran's crude oil exports" and generates a profit of tens of billions of dollars, benefiting the Iranian regime and the Shamkhani family. The Treasury noted that the Shamkhani family's ill-gotten wealth enables access to exclusive privileges unavailable to ordinary Iranians, including international property ownership and foreign passports, allowing them to travel the world undetected while hiding their connection to Iran. Scott Bessent, Secretary of the Treasury, is quoted as saying "The Shamkhani family's shipping empire highlights how the Iranian regime elites leverage their positions to accrue massive wealth and fund the regime's dangerous behavior".

=== Daughter's wedding ===
In October 2025, a leaked wedding video of Shamkhani's daughter Setayesh (Fatemeh) prompted sharp criticism for hypocrisy and ostentation. In the video, the bride is seen wearing a low-cut, strapless dress which shows her cleavage, her mother is shown in a similarly revealing blue lace evening gown with bare back and sides, other women at the event are seen not wearing a Hijab. Contrasting the video with Shamkhani's history of enforcing strict Islamic rules on women and girls and violently cracking down on the 2022 Hijab protests, critics have accused Shamkhani with practising an immodest lifestyle, while preaching and enforcing piety in public. Commentators also noted the event's opulence, reportedly a $20,000 affair at a luxury Tehran hotel, even as the Islamic Republic faces inflation and an economic crisis. The behaviour in the video was said to be a display of "disregard for conservative Islamic values" as well as adoption of Western-style wedding traditions. Allies of Shamkhani claimed the footage came from a women-only segment and defended Shamkhani's conduct. According to The New York Times, Iranian political journalist and editor, Amir Hossein Mosalla, said the video exhibited that "the regime officials themselves have no belief in their own laws that they support, they only want to make people's lives miserable". In the aftermath of the video leak, a Clubhouse discussion of political commentators and veterans of the Iran-Iraq War demanded his full resignation and a public apology. Critics further cited accusations of corruption and sanctions-evasion networks linked to his family.

In October 2025, after the wedding video leak, allegations surfaced regarding the participation of Shamkhani in the murder of Malek Boroujerdi, director of the state-owned Iranian National Oil Company, who was shot dead by gunmen in the city of Ahvaz in December 1978. The murder was perpetrated by two gunmen, who were never named until allegations were made tying it to Shamkhani, who was an organizer in Iran's underground Islamist movements at the time, and Mohsen Razaei, former commander of the IRGC. According to Boroujerdi's son, Mehrzad, dean of the School of Humanities at the University of Missouri, Malek was on a list of ten individuals targeted for their resistance to the revolution, and he was executed by the two, who came to the hospital later to confirm that he was dead. Mehrzad Boroujerdi addressed Shamkhani in an Instagram post and stated "You are the same person who assassinated my father, Malek Mohammad Boroujerdi, in Ahvaz in January 1978, along with your accomplice Mohsen Rezaei". He added: "The masks have fallen; what remains is your true face, the face of hypocrisy, power-seeking, and crime... In my eyes, you, who got your hands stained with blood at the age of 23, are just as despicable at the age of 70. May your shame be eternal, Admiral Murderer".

== Sanctions ==
On 10 January 2020, the US State Department extended its sanctions under Executive Order 13876 to Shamkhani and seven other individuals, and "twenty-two entities and three vessels pursuant to Executive Order 13871" as well as a Chinese steel trading organisation under the Iran Freedom and Counter-Proliferation Act. According to secretary Steven T. Mnuchin, Shamkhani and other senior Regime Officials were sanctioned for "their involvement and complicity in Tuesday's ballistic missile strikes". according to the statement, the sanctions will continue until all terrorist support and promotion by the Iranian regime ends.

== Personal life ==
Ali Shamkhani was the father of Hossein Shamkhani, said to successfully manage international oil trading operations despite U.S. sanctions targeting Iranian oil. According to U.S. officials, Hossein is a major figure in the supply of Iranian arms to Russia.

== Assassination attempt and death ==
On 13 June 2025, during the early stages of the Iran–Israel war, the Israel Defense Forces (IDF) reportedly carried out an airstrike targeting senior Iranian officials, including Ali Shamkhani. Some early Iranian media reports claimed that Shamkhani had been killed in the strike, but on 20 June 2025, Iranian media confirmed that Shamkhani had survived the attack and was in stable condition after sustaining severe injuries. Shamkhani was later seen, with a cane, attending a funeral ceremony honouring Iranian military commanders and nuclear scientists killed during the conflict.

On 28 February 2026, the Israel Defense Forces announced that they had killed Shamkhani and six other Iranian military leaders in airstrikes in Tehran, Iran. The Iranian government confirmed his death the following day.

His funeral was held in the Imamzadeh Saleh shrine in northern Tehran, and he was reportedly buried without a head.

== Writings ==
Help Us, published in 2011, is a collection of Shamkhani's letters written early in the Iran–Iraq War addressing shortages in ammunition and weaponry. It also consists of interviews. Compiled by Ahad Gudarziani, the book was published by Sureh Mehr Publication, and the title comes from the opening sentence of a letter.

== Awards and honours ==
In 2003, Shamkhani received the Shoja'at Medal, the highest military medal from President Mohammad Khatami. He was also honoured for his eight years service as minister of defence in 2005. In 2004, Shamkhani received the Order of King Abdulaziz, the highest award in Saudi Arabia from King Fahd for his prominent role in the design and implementation in developing relations with Arabic countries in the Persian Gulf. He was the first Iranian minister to receive the medal and received medals from the presidents of Syria and Lebanon in February 2004.

== Notes ==
Military offices
Preceded by Yousef Kolahdouz	Deputy Commander-in-Chief of the IRGC; June 1982 – 24 September 1989	Succeeded by Yahya Rahim Safavi
Preceded by New Office	Deputy for Intelligence and Operations of the General Staff; 1988 – 1989	Succeeded by Gholam Ali Rashid
Preceded by Yahya Rahim Safavi	Commander of the IRGC Ground Forces; 30 April 1986 – 20 September 1988	Succeeded by Yahya Rahim Safavi
Preceded by Mohammad-Hossein Malekzadegan	Commander of the Islamic Republic of Iran Navy; 30 October 1989 – 27 August 1997	Succeeded by Abbas Mohtaj
Preceded by Hossein Alaei	Commander of the IRGC Navy; 23 December 1990 – 27 August 1997	Succeeded by Ali Akbar Ahmadian
Government offices
Preceded by Mohsen Rafighdoost	Minister of Revolutionary Guards; 20 September 1988 – 21 August 1989	Ministry dissolved
Preceded by Mohammad Forouzandeh	Minister of Defense; 20 August 1997 – 24 August 2005	Succeeded by Mostafa Mohammad-Najjar
Preceded by Saeed Jalili	Secretary of the SNSC; 10 September 2013 – 22 May 2023	Succeeded by Ali Akbar Ahmadian
