= Hasan Aghareb Parast =

Iranian commander

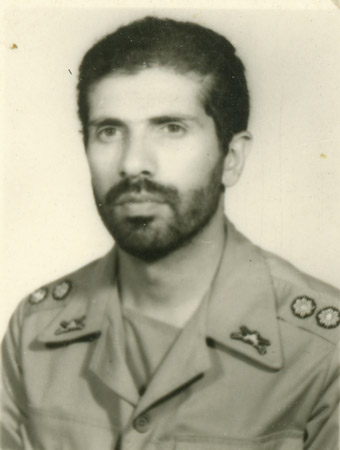
- Born: 21 April 1946; Isfahan, Pahlavi Iran
- Died: 17 October 1984 (aged 38); Majnoon Island, Ba'athist Iraq
- Military career
- Allegiance: (Pahlavi Iran) Imperial State of Iran (1965–1979); Islamic Republic of Iran (1979–1984)
- Service years: 1965–1984
- Rank: Colonel
- Unit: 92nd Armored Division
- Conflicts: Iran–Iraq War †

Hasan Aghareb Parast (Persian: حسن اقارب پرست) (1946 – 1984) was an Iranian military officer in the Iranian Army Ground Forces. He was the deputy commander of the 92nd Armored Division during the Iran-Iraq War and was killed in action in the war.

== Biography ==
Hassan Aghareb Parast was born in Isfahan, Iran in the religious family on 21 April 1946. His father was Mohammad Rahim. He married on 1971 and has four sons.

== Education ==
Hassan spent his education in Isfahan and achieved high school diploma in 1964. Then he enrolled in exam of Officers' Academy and accepted on 1965. Hassan passed primary course in the Tehran and after that went to Shiraz on 1968. He married on 1971 and on this year went to England for educating Chieftain (tank) course. Two years later went to America and passed chemical warfare period. When returned to Iran, he established chemical and microbial warfare course in Iran for the first time.

== In the Iranian Revolution ==
Hassan and Yousef Kolahdouz had revolutionary activities against Mohammad Reza Pahlavi in the Army. They received statements and cassette of Ruhollah Khomeini and then dispersed between military forces.

== In the Iran-Iraq war ==
When the Iran-Iraq War started, he went to the 92nd Armored Division in Khorramshar and was deputy commander of the division. Also, he was a candidate for commander of joint staff and defense minister.

== Death ==
On 17 October 1984, he along with other commanders were killed on Majnoon Island by a mortar shell.

== Bibliography ==
- Until the life of love: The biography of military rank martyr Hasan Aghareb Parast Cultural unit of Martyr Foundation (1996)

== See also ==
- List of Iranian commanders in the Iran–Iraq War
