= Mostazafan Foundation =

State-owned charitable organization in Iran

Islamic Revolution Mostazafan Foundation
- Type: Bonyad
- Predecessor: Pahlavi Foundation
- Founded: 21 February 1980; 46 years ago
- Founder: Ruhollah Khomeini
- Headquarters: Tehran, Iran
- Key people: Hossein Dehghan (CEO)
- Subsidiaries: List: Sina Bank; Alavi Foundation; Behran Oil Company
- Website: Official website

The Mostazafan Foundation of Islamic Revolution (Persian: بنیاد مستضعفان انقلاب اسلامی), formerly Bonyad-e Mostazafan va Janbazan (Foundation of the Oppressed and Disabled or "MFJ") is a charitable bonyad, or foundation, in the Islamic Republic of Iran, the second-largest commercial enterprise in Iran behind the state-owned National Iranian Oil Company and the biggest holding company in the Middle East. The foundation was formerly directly run by Ruhollah Khomeini.

It was founded in 1979 as a successor to the Pahlavi Foundation. As an economic, cultural, and social welfare institution, the foundation controls manufacturing and industrial companies, whose profits are used—according to the foundation—to promote "the living standards of the disabled and poor individuals" of Iran and to "develop general public awareness with regards to history, books, museums, and cinema."

According to one of the foundation's former directors, Mohsen Rafighdoost, Mostazafan allocates 50 percent of its profits to providing aid to the needy in the form of low-interest loans or monthly pensions, while it reinvests the remaining 50 percent its various subsidiaries. The Mostazafan Foundation is associated with the Islamic Revolutionary Guard Corps , from which some of its head officials have come, and controlled by the Khamenei family.

== History ==
=== Pahlavi Foundation ===
Mohammad Reza Pahlavi established the Pahlavi Foundation as a tax-exempt charity in 1958. This foundation held the assets of Reza Shah, his predecessor, and many of his family, who later served on the corporate board and received commissions. The Pahlavi Foundation's wealth was estimated at $3 billion at its height. The Pahlavi Foundation was dogged by accusations of corruption.

The Pahlavi Foundation was said to have owned four leading hotels in Iran: the Hilton, the Vanak, the Evin and the Darband. The foundation gained international attention for purchasing the DePinna building on Fifth Avenue, New York, valued in 1975 at $14.5 million. Such investment in a foreign market by the Pahlavi Foundation gained media attention because in order to do such foreign investment the foundation had to register as an American charitable foundation with the declared aim of using the rental to pay for Iranian students studying in the United States.

The advantage of such charitable status was that the US authorities could not investigate the books of the Pahlavi Foundation in Iran.

=== Mostazafan Foundation ===
Following the Islamic Revolution, the Pahlavi Foundation was renamed the Bonyad-e Mostazafan (Foundation of the Oppressed), and its economic assets increased by more than double after the property of fifty millionaires was confiscated and added to the endowment.

A decade after the Revolution, the foundation's assets totaled more than $20 billion, and included "some 140 factories, 470 agrobusinesses, 100 construction firms, 64 mines, and 250 commercial companies." By 1994, the foundation conducted six trillion rials' worth of business transactions, compared with 5.5 trillion rials collected by the government in taxes. By 1996 the foundation began taking government funds to cover welfare disbursements.

Because of the Iran–Iraq War, the foundation was given the responsibility to supervise and aid veterans wounded in the war and the name Janbazan (disabled) added to it. Sometime before December 2005 the foundation changed its name back to Bonyad Mostazafan as the "Martyrs and War Veterans Foundation" took over war veterans affairs.

Important Revolutionary Guards who have headed the foundation include Mohsen Rafighdoost, who served as Minister of the Revolutionary Guards from 1982 to 1989 before heading the foundation until 1999; and Mohammad Forouzandeh, the chief of staff of the Revolutionary Guard in the late 1980s and later Defense Minister, who was head of the foundation from 1999 to 2014.

The United States imposed sanctions and blacklisted the Bonyad Mostazafan, an organization controlled by Khamenei. The sanctions froze U.S. assets and barred Americans from doing business with them. The foundation controls hundreds of properties confiscated since the 1979 revolution.

== Status ==
Legally, the Mostazafan Foundation, is neither a public entity, nor a private one. It is classified as a nonprofit organization, in which the government cannot interfere in its affairs. The foundation only answers to the Supreme Leader.

== Economic activity ==
The foundation is involved in numerous sectors of the economy, including shipping, metal, petrochemicals, construction materials, dams, towers, farming, horticulture, tourism, transportation, hotels, and commercial services. It controls 40% of Iran's production of soft drinks, including Zamzam Cola which it owns and produces; the newspapers Ettelaat and Kayhan. It "controls 20% of the country's production of textiles ... two-thirds of all glass products and a dominant share also in tiles, chemicals, tires, foodstuffs." Its total value was estimated by one source at "as much as $12 billion," by another as "in all probability exceed[ing] $10 billion."

Mostazafan's largest subsidiary is the Agricultural and Food Industries Organization (AFIO), which owns more than 115 additional companies. Some of the foundation's contract work also includes large engineering projects, such as the construction of Terminal One of the Imam Khomeini International Airport.

Mostazafan also has a history of soliciting contract work abroad. It currently maintains economic connections with countries in the Middle East, Europe, Africa, and South Asia, as well as in Russia and other former states of the Soviet Union.

According to one of the foundation's former directors, Mohsen Rafighdoost, Mostazafan allocates 50 percent of its profits to providing aid to the needy in the form of low-interest loans or monthly pensions, while it invests the remaining 50 percent in its various subsidiaries. With over 200,000 employees, it owns and operates approximately 350 subsidiary and affiliate companies in numerous industries including agriculture, industry, transportation, and tourism. Bonyad-e Mostazafan va Janbazan represented approximately 10 percent of the Iranian government's annual budget in 2003. The MJF has an estimated value of more than $3 billion.

== Controversies ==
As employers of approximately five million Iranians and providers of social welfare services to "perhaps several million more", bonyads such as Mostazafan" have a large constituency and are able to build support for the government among the working and lower classes." Nonetheless, the foundation has been subject to a number of controversies common to other bonyads in the years since its inception. The foundation and other bonyads are "exempt from official oversight as key religious leaders and former or current government officials control them. They enjoy virtual tax exemption and customs privileges, preferential access to credit and foreign exchange, and regulatory protection from private sector competition".

In 2003, there was talk of the foundation "spinning off its social responsibilities" and becoming "a purely commercial conglomerate," leaving open the question of who would own it and why it should exist as a foundation.

In April 2025, an explosion at an Iranian port, which killed approximately 70 people and injured over 1,000 others, had its epicenter at a facility owned by Mostazafan Foundation. The port where the blast happened, named Shahid Rajaei, allegedly took in a chemical component needed for solid fuel for ballistic missiles.

== See also ==
- Bonyad
- Economy of Iran
- Foundation for the Preservation and Publication of Sacred Defense Works and Values
