= Ministry of Revolutionary Guards =

Iranian government ministry (1982–1989)

Ministry overview
- Formed: November 9, 1982
- Dissolved: August 21, 1989
- Superseding Ministry: Merged into Ministry of Defence and Armed Forces Logistics
- Jurisdiction: Islamic Revolutionary Guard Corps
- Annual budget: $700 million (1987)

Ministry of Guards (Persian: وزارت سپاه, romanized: Vezārat-e Sepāh) was a government ministry in Iran between 1982 and 1989, which mainly acted as a ministry of defence dedicated to logistically supply the Islamic Revolutionary Guard Corps. By having its own ministry, the Corps were able to acquire a powerful voice in the cabinet of Iran. It also implied greater regulation and supervision over the Corps by placing its acquisitions and purchases under and the audit and purview of the government.

It mirrored the existing parallel Ministry of National Defence (the word "National" was dropped in 1984) which solely supported and addressed the administrative affairs of the Regular Armed Forces (Artesh) during these years. In 1989, it was dissolved and reintegrated into the Ministry of Defence and Armed Forces Logistics (MODAFL), in order to centralize military logistics among the Iranian Armed Forces.

== Ministers ==
No.	Portrait	Minister	Took office	Left office	Time in office	Ref.
1	Mohsen Rafighdoost	Mohsen Rafighdoost (born 1940)	9 November 1982	13 September 1988	5 years, 317 days	
–	Mahmoud Pakravan [fa]	Mahmoud Pakravan; Acting	13 September 1988	20 September 1988	7 days	
2	Ali Shamkhani	Ali Shamkhani (1955–2026)	20 September 1988	21 August 1989	335 days	

== See also ==
- Economic activities of the Iranian Revolutionary Guard Corps
- Islamic Revolutionary Guard Corps
- Pasdar (IRGC)
