= Mohammad Forouzandeh =

Iranian politician

Sardar Mohammad Forouzandeh
- محمد فروزنده
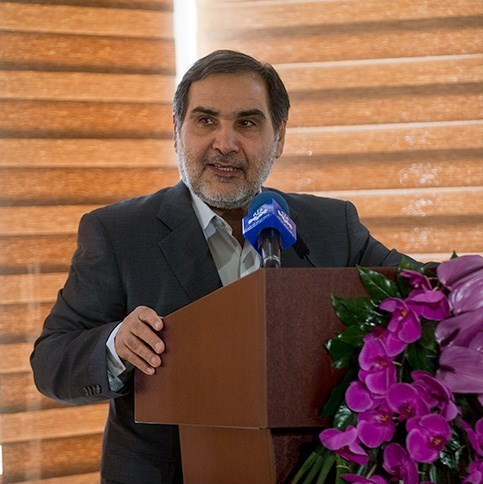
- Forouzandeh in 2014

Member of Expediency Discernment Council
- Incumbent
- Assumed office 27 February 2007
- Appointed by: Ali Khamenei
- President: Mohammad Khatami; Mahmoud Ahmadinejad; Hassan Rouhani; Ebrahim Raisi; Mohammad Mokhber (acting); Masoud Pezeshkian
- Supreme Leader: Ali Khamenei
- Chairman: Akbar Hashemi Rafsanjani; Ali Movahedi-Kermani (Acting); Mahmoud Hashemi Shahroudi; Sadeq Larijani

Head of Mostazafan Foundation
- In office 22 July 1999 – 22 July 2014
- Appointed by: Ali Khamenei
- President: Mohammad Khatami; Mahmoud Ahmadinejad; Hassan Rouhani
- Supreme Leader: Ali Khamenei
- Preceded by: Mohsen Rafighdoost
- Succeeded by: Mohammad Saeedikia

Minister of Defence and Armed Forces Logistics
- In office 16 August 1993 – 20 August 1997
- President: Akbar Hashemi Rafsanjani
- Supreme Leader: Ali Khamenei
- Preceded by: Akbar Torkan
- Succeeded by: Ali Shamkhani

2nd Deputy Chief of the General Staff of the Iranian Armed Forces
- In office 30 September 1989 – 11 September 1993
- President: Akbar Hashemi Rafsanjani
- Supreme Leader: Ali Khamenei
- Preceded by: Hassan Firouzabadi
- Succeeded by: Ali Sayad Shirazi

Chief of the General Staff of the IRGC
- In office 1987 – 22 September 1989
- President: Ali Khamenei; Akbar Hashemi Rafsanjani
- Supreme Leader: Ali Khamenei
- Preceded by: Alireza Afshar
- Succeeded by: Mohammad Bagher Zolghadr

Personal details
- Born: 1960 (age 65–66) Tehran, Iran

Military service
- Allegiance: Iran
- Branch/service: IRGC
- Years of service: 1979–2007
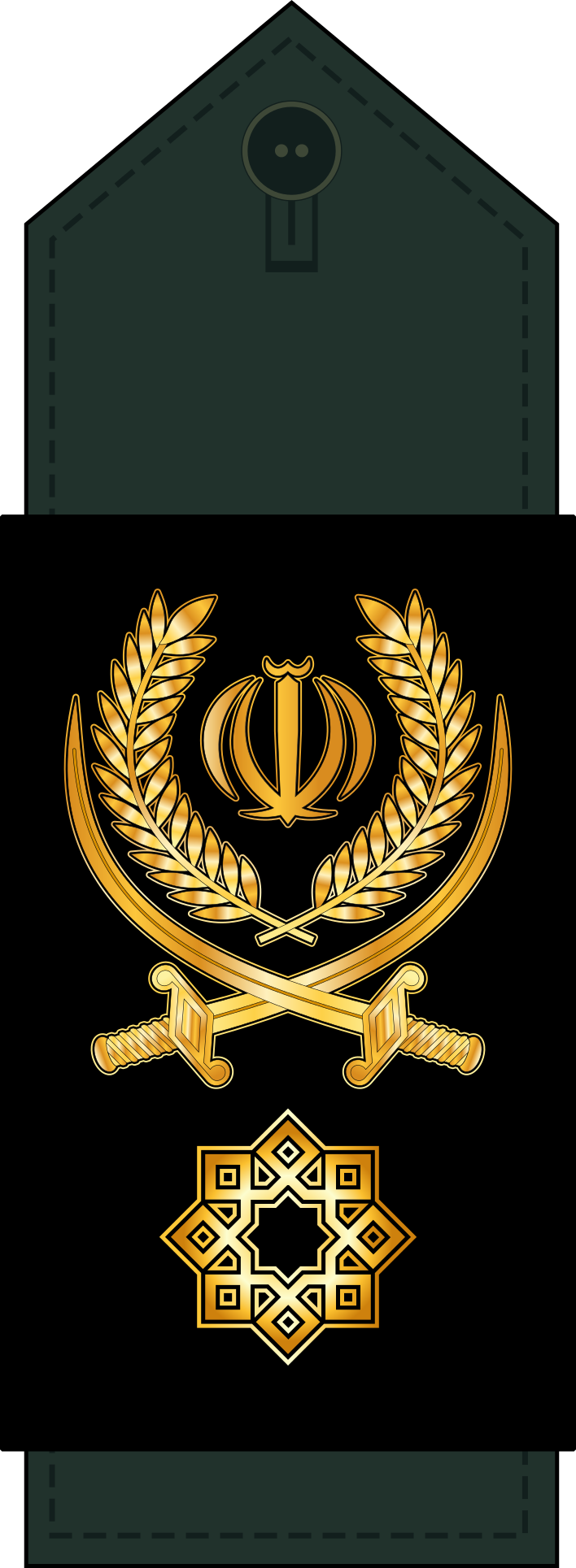
- Rank: Brigadier General
- Battles/wars: Iran–Iraq War

Mohammad Forouzandeh Behbahani (Persian: محمد فروزنده بهبهانی; born in 1960) is an Iranian politician and security figure. He is currently member of the Expediency Discernment Council.

He was the former head of the Bonyad-e Mostazafen va Janbazan (Foundation of the Oppressed and Disabled). His tenure as head of the foundation began on December 3, 2004, and was renewed for another five years on December 2, 2009. He resigned from his post on July 22, 2014, and was replaced by Mohammad Saeedikia. He served as chief of staff of the Revolutionary Guard from late 1987 to 1989 and later as Minister of Defence and Armed Forces Logistics of Iran.

Military offices
Preceded by Hassan Firouzabadi as Deputy Head of Commander-in-Chief Headquarters	Deputy Chief of the General Staff of Iranian Armed Forces; 30 September 1989 – 11 September 1993	Succeeded by Ali Sayad Shirazi
Preceded by Alireza Afshar	Chief of the General Staff of the IRGC; 1987 – 22 September 1989	Succeeded by Mohammad Bagher Zolghadr as Chief of the Joint Staff
Political offices
Preceded by Akbar Torkan	Minister of Defence; 16 August 1993 – 20 August 1997	Succeeded by Ali Shamkhani
