= Hossein Shamkhani =

Iranian oil magnate

- حسین شمخانی
- Born: Mohammad Hossein Shamkhani; Tehran, Iran
- Other names: Hector, H, Hugo Hayek
- Citizenship: Iran
- Education: Lebanese American University
- Occupation: Businessman
- Relatives: Ali Shamkhani (father)

Hossein Shamkhani is an Iranian oil magnate.

His Dubai-based company, Milavous Group Ltd., is accused of illegally generating billions of dollars by selling Iranian and Russian crude globally. According to an Iranian researcher, "The Shamkhani network can be considered one of the three largest oil traders in Iran."

In July 2025, he was targeted with sanctions by the United States and European Union for allegedly generating billions of dollars in oil revenue for the regimes in Tehran and Moscow. He and his brother own real estate in Dubai under aliases in Caribbean passports.

== Early life and education ==
Hossein Shamkhani was born in Tehran shortly after the 1979 Islamic Revolution. He is the son of Ali Shamkhani, a former commander of the IRGC Navy and Iranian Navy, and a long-serving figure in Iran's security establishment. He appeared on the Iranian television programme Glass Triangle in 2012 as a young man, during which his father publicly advised him to stay out of government work. He earned a degree from the Lebanese American University in Beirut, where his younger brother Abolfazl also studied.

Shamkhani previously held Dominican citizenship, acquired through the country's citizenship by investment programme, under the name "Hugo Hayek". His younger brother, Abolfazl Shamkhani, who is also alleged by U.S. prosecutors to manage parts of the network, holds a Dominica passport under the name "Sami Hayek" and has also used the name "Hassan Shamkhani" in business dealings.

== Career ==
=== Oil sales investigation ===
Bloomberg L.P. reported that Shamkhani controls an oil empire that accounts for a significant portion of Iranian and Russian crude oil exports. The report links him to the Dubai-registered Milavous Group Ltd., which has generated billions of dollars by selling goods from Iran, Russia, and other countries. He is said to have utilized citizenship-by-investment schemes to gain entry into the global banking system.

Shamkhani is said to control a network of companies that facilitate the export of oil and petroleum products from Iran and Russia through countries that have not imposed Western sanctions. His companies operate a fleet of dozens of vessels, including tankers and cargo ships.

=== Weapons sales investigation ===
According to U.S. officials, Shamkhani is a key figure in the supply of Iranian weapons to Russia. Through a network of companies, including the Dubai-based Crios Shipping LLC, he is accused of transporting missiles, drone components, and dual-use goods.

=== JPMorgan investigation ===
The U.S. Treasury Department is investigating JPMorgan Chase's relationship with a hedge fund reportedly connected to Iranian oil trader Hossein Shamkhani's network. According to Bloomberg LP, capital from Shamkhani's oil deals is being funneled to Ocean Leonid through shell companies, with Western lenders like JPMorgan reportedly providing financial support. This has raised concerns about the fund’s potential compliance with sanctions.

== Sanctions and legal actions ==
On 21 July 2025, the European Union added Shamkhani, Milavous Group Ltd. and Admiral Group to its sanctions list as part of its 18th sanctions package against Russia, describing him as "a central player" in Russia's "shadow fleet". On 30 July 2025, the U.S. Treasury's Office of Foreign Assets Control (OFAC) designated more than 50 individuals and entities and identified over 50 vessels in what it described as its largest Iran-related action since 2018, naming Shamkhani as the controller of the network. On 21 August 2025, the United Kingdom imposed matching designations on Shamkhani, Milavous Group, Admiral Shipping Group, Ocean Leonid Investments and the Petrochemical Commercial Company.

An investigation by the Organized Crime and Corruption Reporting Project in March 2026 reported that Shamkhani and his brother Abolfazl had acquired four luxury villas in Dubai's Golf Place and Jumeirah Bay Island developments worth about US$29 million at the time of purchase, held under their Dominica identities as "Hugo Hayek" and "Sami Hayek". Dominica later revoked Shamkhani's passport after the U.S. sanctions.

On 6 March 2026, the United States Department of Justice filed two civil forfeiture complaints in a federal court in Washington, D.C., seeking to seize more than US$15.3 million allegedly connected to wire transfers by front companies in the Shamkhani network. The U.S. Treasury has also opened an investigation into JPMorgan Chase's dealings with Ocean Leonid Investments over potential sanctions exposure.
