= Operation Mersad =

1988 Iranian operation in the Iran–Iraq War

Operation Forough Javidan/Mersad
- Part of the Iran–Iraq War
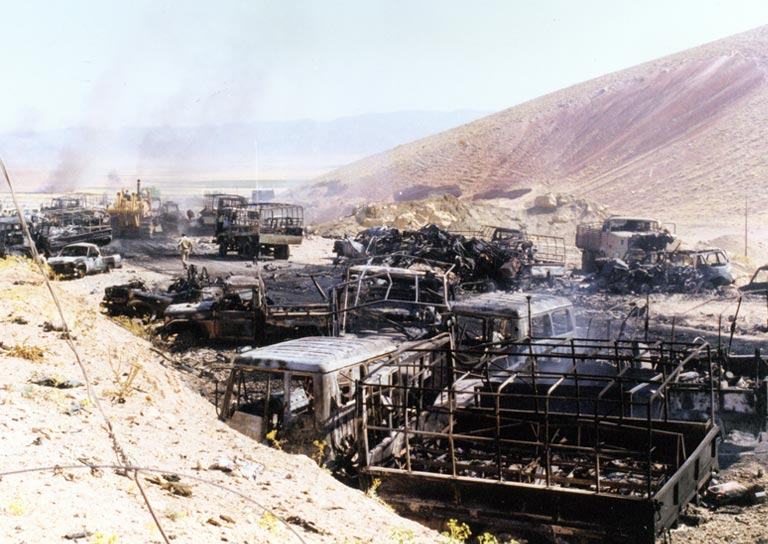
- Burned-out vehicles in the aftermath of Operation Mersad
| Date | 26–30 July 1988 (4 days) |
| Location | Kermanshah province |
| Result | Iranian victory: Defeat of the Mojahadeen-e-Khalq (MEK); 1988 executions of Iranian political prisoners |
| Territorial changes | Status quo ante bellum: The Shatt al-Arab and other disputed territories along the border (3000sq.km) remain under unilateral Iraqi control until 16 August 1990 when both parties signed a formal peace agreement, after which Iraq and Iran re-ratified the 1975 Algiers Agreement. |

Belligerents
| Mojahedin-e-Khalq | Iran |

Commanders and leaders
| Massoud Rajavi | (Iran) Ruhollah Khomeini; (Iran) Ali Sayad Shirazi; (Iran) Mohsen Rezaee |

Units involved
| National Liberation Army of Iran | 27th Muhammad Rasulullah Division; 81st Armoured Division of Kermanshah; 35th Takavar Separate Brigade of Kermanshah; Havanirooz 1st Combat Base |

Strength
| 7,000 MEK troops 300 tanks unknown number of artillery pieces and aircraft | 210,000 Iranian forces engaged 1,200,000 total 365 tanks unknown number of artillery pieces and aircraft |

Casualties and losses
| 1,500 to 2,506 KIA (Iranian claim); 1,263 KIA, WIA, MIA, POW (MEK claim); 2,000 KIA (independent estimate) several thousand hanged for treason 200 Tanks destroyed (Iranian claim); 400 APCs; 90 pieces of 80mm mortar 150 pieces of 60mm mortar 30 pieces of 106mm recoilless rifles | 480 KIA (Iranian claim) |

Operation Mersad (Persian: عملیات مرصاد, lit. 'Operation Ambush') was the Iranian counteroffensive against the People's Mujahedin of Iran (MEK)'s July 1988 incursion into western Iran, which the MEK code-named Operation Forough Javidan (عملیات فروغ جاویدان, 'Operation Eternal Light'). These operations were among the last major military actions of the Iran–Iraq War.

In July 1988, 7,000 MEK militants launched Operation Eternal Light, a major offensive from Iraqi territory that began on 26 July and aimed to capture key cities such as Kermanshah and ultimately topple the Iranian government. The ensuing Iranian counteroffensive, known as Operation Mersad and led by Lieutenant-General Ali Sayad Shirazi of the Iranian Armed Forces, defeated the MEK within a few days.

== Prelude and objectives ==
United Nations Security Council Resolution 598 was adopted on 20 July 1987. By July 1988, Iran had suffered major defeats in southern Iraq during the Second Battle of Al Faw and Operation Tawakalna ala Allah as well as along the central portion of the border within Iran. Tehran formally accepted the resolution on 18 July 1988. The MEK operation code-named "Eternal Light" took place on 26 July 1988, six days after Ayatollah Khomeini publicly announced that decision.

Following Operation Mersad, Iranian officials ordered the mass execution of prisoners said to support the MEK. Hussein-Ali Montazeri said the Ministry of Intelligence used Operation Mersad as a pretext to carry out the mass killings, which "had been under consideration for several years".

== Operations Eternal Light and Mersad ==
The MEK's offensive, code-named Operation Eternal Light, began on 26 July 1988. The ensuing Iranian counteroffensive was known as Operation Mersad. Iranian forces evacuated Qasr-e Shirin and Sarpol-e Zahab as a result.

These two towns were to be used by the MEK to push further into Iran. On 26 July, the MEK advanced further into Iran and captured Kerend-e Gharb and Islamabad-e Gharb. They also captured key strongholds along the Baghdad-Tehran highway. The MEK met scant resistance from the limited numbers of Revolutionary Guards, which were promptly defeated, pushing 145 km (90 mi) deep into Iran towards the provincial capital city of Kermanshah. Iran's Kurdish fighters did slow the advance, allowing time for the Iranians to prepare their counteroffensive.

The MEK's next target was the provincial capital city of Kermanshah, with a population of 500,000. The Iranian regime allowed the MEK to advance to the city but had prepared an ambush. This counterattack, called Operation Mersad, was led by Lieutenant General Ali Sayad Shirazi. Iran cut off MEK's supply lines.

As the Iraqi air force did not venture beyond Islamabad-e Gharb, Iranian air force attacked the MEK forces. Iranian Air Force F-4 Phantoms bombed MEK convoys on the Kermanshah highway, followed by Army Aviation helicopters using anti-tank missiles. Most enemy armour was destroyed, in a miniature version of the Highway of Death during the Persian Gulf War.

On 31 July, Iran drove MEK forces out of Qasr-e-Shirin and Sarpol Zahab, though the MEK claimed to have "voluntarily withdrawn" from the towns. Iran estimated that 4,500 MEK soldiers were killed, while 400 Iranian soldiers died. Many senior MEK commanders were killed, and many MEK militants were not given quarter. Iranian officials claimed they destroyed 200 tanks and 700 other vehicles.

The Iranian successes during Operation Mersad were partially because of effective coordination between the Army and the Revolutionary Guard.

== Aftermath ==
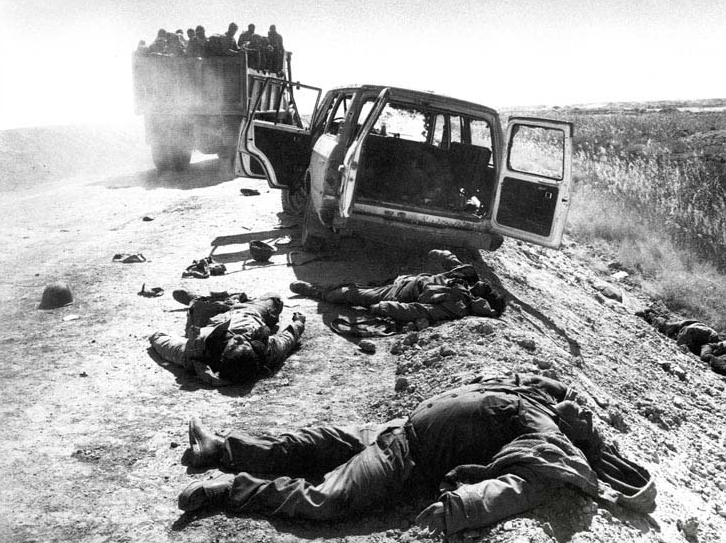
MEK militants killed in Operation Mersad by IRGC in Kermanshah

Operation Mersad was the last land battle of the Iran–Iraq War.

The last notable combat actions of the war took place on 3 August 1988, in the Persian Gulf when the Iranian navy fired on a freighter and Iraq launched chemical attacks on Iranian civilians, killing an unknown number of them and wounding 2,300.

On 8 August 1988, the UN Secretary-General announced that Iran and Iraq had agreed to a ceasefire with effect from 20 August 1988 under Resolution 598. By 20 August 1988, the ceasefire had come into effect, and UN peacekeepers belonging to the UNIIMOG mission were present in Iran and Iraq, remaining on the Iran–Iraq border until 1991. While the war was now over, Iraq spent the rest of August and early September clearing the Kurdish resistance. Using 60,000 troops along with helicopter gunships, chemical weapons (poison gas), and mass executions, Iraq hit 15 villages, killing rebels and civilians, and forced tens of thousands of Kurds to relocate to forced settlements. Many Kurdish civilians immigrated to Iran. By 3 September 1988, the anti-Kurd campaign ended, and all resistance had been crushed. 400 Iraqi soldiers and 50,000 Kurdish civilians and soldiers had been killed.

Following the operation, Iran executed several thousand political prisoners across the country, mainly members of the MEK, but also members of the Tudeh Party (Communist Party) and other opposition groups. The estimates for number of executions vary from 5,000 to 30,000 people. The death toll may have been higher for those MEK executed by frontline courts-martial or dying in prison.

Ali Sayad Shirazi was the Iranian commander responsible for the coordination between the Revolutionary Guard and the Iranian army. In April 1999, an MEK operative posing as a roadsweeper killed Shirazi outside his home.

== Bibliography ==
- Farrokh, Kaveh (20 December 2011). Iran at War: 1500–1988. Osprey Publishing. p. 609. ISBN 978-1-78096-221-4.
- "The Lessons of Modern War - Volume II - The Iran–Iraq War (Chapter 10: The Combination Of Iraqi Offensives And Western Intervention Force Iran To Accept A Cease-Fire: September 1987 To March 1989) - May, 1990 - 9005lessonsiraniraqii-chap10.pdf" (PDF). Archived from the original (PDF) on 7 June 2013.

== See also ==
- People's Mujahedin of Iran
- Massoud Rajavi
- Operation Forty Stars
