= List of choking deaths =

This is a list of notable people who have died by choking.

- 405 BC: Sophocles (aged 91): Diodorus Siculus claims Sophocles choked on a grape seed in a cup of wine.
- circa 200: Lucius Fabius Cilo: Pliny the Elder claims "Chilo" perished from choking on a single hair in a draught of milk.
- 453: Attila the Hun (aged 47), although cause of death is disputed.
- 1065: Godwin, Earl of Wessex (aged ~55), reported (by Aelred of Rievaulx) to have choked to death at a Winchester banquet with Edward the Confessor after asking God to witness his claimed innocence in the death of Edward's brother.
- 1946: Alexander Alekhine (aged 53), autopsy indicates heart attack, but supposed witness claimed choking.
- 1956: Tommy Dorsey (aged 51)
- 1957: Raymond Griffith (aged 62)
- 1960: Air Marshal Subroto Mukerjee (aged 49), first Chief of the Air Staff of the Indian Air Force (IAF), died on 8 November 1960 at Tokyo by choking on a piece of food lodged in his windpipe.
- 1963: Skinnay Ennis (aged 55)
- 1967: Jimmie Foxx, famous Major League Baseball player, died by choking on a bone on 21 July 1967 aged 59.
- 1970: Jimi Hendrix (aged 27), choked on his aspirated vomit while unconscious with barbiturates.
- 1971: T. V. Soong (aged 76), former premier of Republic of China
- 1978: Dingle Foot (aged 72), well known British politician and brother to future Labour Party Leader Michael Foot died in a Hong Kong hotel after choking on bone in a chicken sandwich.
- 1980: John Bonham (aged 32), Led Zeppelin drummer. Bonham had consumed around 40 shots (1–1.4 litres) of 40% ABV vodka in a 24 hour period, after which he vomited and choked (a condition known as pulmonary aspiration). The finding was accidental death.
- 1980: Bon Scott (aged 33), the lead vocalist and lyricist of the hard rock band AC/DC. The official report of the coroner concluded that Scott had died of "acute alcohol poisoning (which made him choke to death on his own vomit)" and classified it as "Death by misadventure".
- 1981: Christy Brown (aged 49)
- 2009: Christopher Nolan (aged 43), Irish poet and author
- 2017: American rapper Prodigy of Mobb Deep, died by accidental choking (aged 42).
- 2020: Ronny Van Sweevelt (aged 57), Belgian cyclist, died by accidental choking

== In popular culture ==
- Singer "Mama Cass" Elliott did not die from choking on a ham sandwich, as has been alleged.
- In the mockumentary film This is Spinal Tap, the band's former drummer, Eric "Stumpy Joe" Childs, is said to have died after he "choked on vomit" and that "it was actually someone else’s vomit". (This is almost certainly a parody of the deaths of real-life rock stars John Bonham and Bon Scott, as cited above.)
