= Iran Freedom and Counter-Proliferation Act =

US law authorizing sanctions against Iran

The Iran Freedom and Counter-Proliferation Act (IFCA) (passed as part of National Defense Authorization Act for Fiscal Year 2013 Pub. L. 112–239 (text) (PDF)) is an Act of the US Congress which was signed into law by Barack Obama in 2012.

== History ==
In November 2019, Mike Pompeo "made two determinations with sanctions implications pursuant to Section 1245 of the Iran Freedom and Counter-Proliferation Act of 2012 (IFCA): One identifying the construction sector of Iran as being controlled directly or indirectly by the Islamic Revolutionary Guard Corps (IRGC); and one identifying four strategic materials as being used in connection with Iran’s nuclear, military, or ballistic missile programs." The Trump administration "determined that the following materials are used in connection to Iran's nuclear, military or ballistic missile programs: stainless steel 304L tubes; MN40 manganese brazing foil; MN70 manganese brazing foil; and stainless steel CrNi60WTi ESR + VAR (chromium, nickel, 60 percent tungsten, titanium, electro-slag remelting, vacuum arc remelting)."

In June 2020, the Port of Chabahar was spared sanctions because Donald Trump recognized the influence of the port on the stability of Afghanistan.

In July 2020, it caused Iran to drop India from a rail project.

== See also ==
- Iran–United States relations during the Obama administration
