= Yousef Kolahdouz =

Former commander of the Iranian Revolutionary Guards

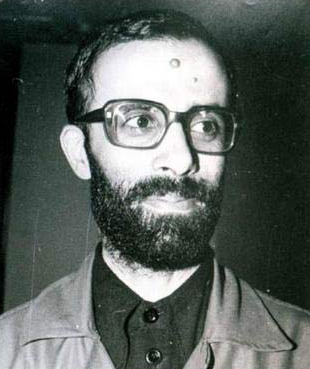
- Born: 22 December 1946; Quchan, Pahlavi Iran
- Died: 30 September 1981 (aged 34) near Kahrizak, Iran
- Spouse: Zahra Mouzerani (married 1973)
- Military career
- Allegiance: Pahlavi Iran (1964–1979); Iran (1979–1981)
- Branch: Imperial Iranian Ground Force; Islamic Revolutionary Guard Corps
- Service years: 1964–1981
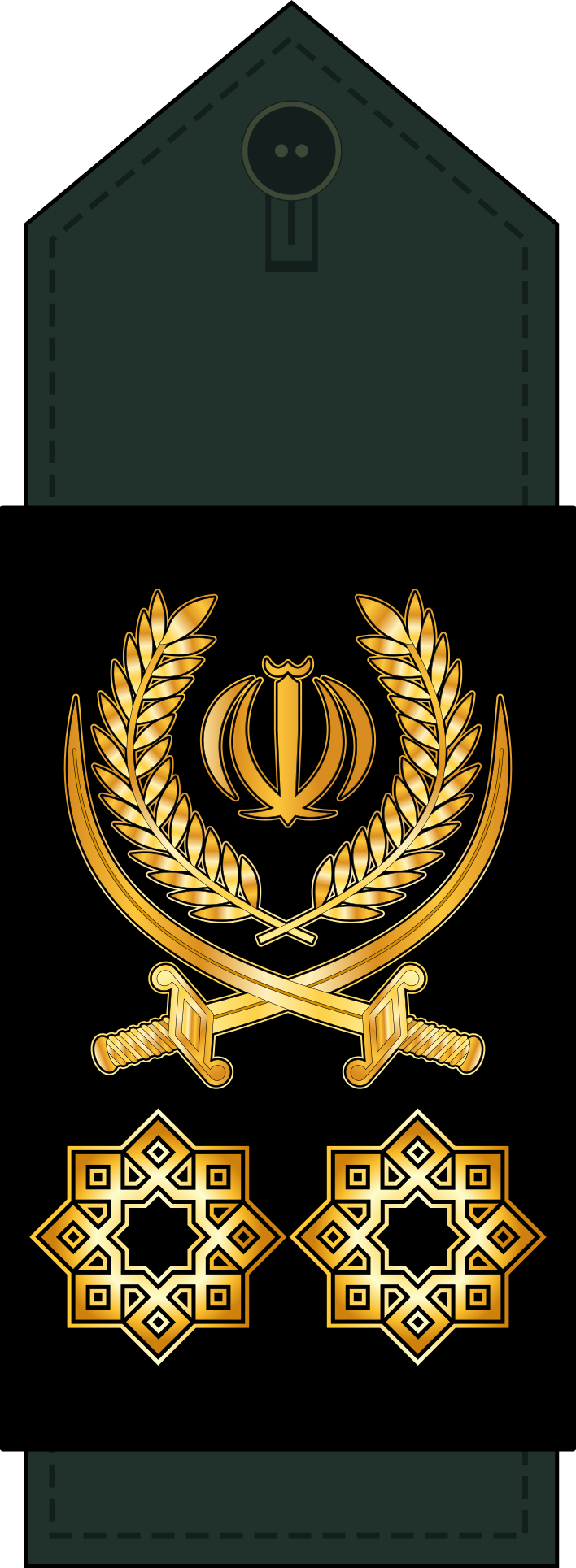
- Rank: Major; Major General (posthumously)
- Unit: Imperial Guard (1974–1979)
- Commands: Deputy Commander of the IRGC (1980–1981); Chief of the Training Department of the Islamic Revolutionary Guard Corps (1979–1980)
- Conflicts: Iran–Iraq War

Yousef Kolahdouz (December 22, 1946 – September 30, 1981; Persian: یوسف کلاهدوز) was an Iranian general during the Iran–Iraq War. He is also counted as one of the founders of the Islamic Revolutionary Guard Corps. He became deputy commander of what was then known as the "Iranian Revolutionary Guards" shortly after the Iranian Revolution.

Kolahdouz was killed in the 1981 Iranian Air Force C-130 crash, when the Iranian Air Force Lockheed C-130 he was in crashed, near Tehran, in 1981; also killed in the crash of C-130H 5-8552 were the Minister of Defense and other high-ranking officers. In his memory, a street in Tehran is named after him.

== Birthday ==
He was born in Quchan, Mashhad. His mother's family originally were from Armenia and immigrated to Iran in 1923. Azizeh, the mother of Yousef, was the third child in her family. Hasan, the father of Yousef, had a store in Ghouchan. When Yousef went to join high school, since he was interested in regularity and orders in nature, he chose the major of Mathematics-physics in high school. He was interested in art and painting. Yousef was very active in cultural affairs since he was a child. Also, he participated in a theater group. He was a basketball player. After getting a diploma, he went to enroll in the faculty of Army officers.

== Officer faculty ==
He went to officer faculty in 1964. He familiarized himself there with Hasan Aghareb Parast. Yousef and Hasan established a council by the name of " nobility council" in Persian"sherafat". They deal with problems such as the conditions of Masters of faculty and also students. They also considered the place of military men in society, obeying, ethics in the army, the virtue of dying for the sake of the country, etc. Yousef became familiar with Master Mousa Namjoo. Namjoy suggested to Hasan Aghareb Parast to participate in a hidden organization. This organization was one of the most complex and fought before the revolution of Iran. according to the memoires of Muhammad Ali Sharif, Mousa Namjoo insisted to cause Yousef to go to Imperial Guard. Kolahdouz was missioned to form the group of ones who are loyal to Ruhollah Khomeini in the Army organization.

== Shiraz ==
Yousef went to shiraz to spend the armorial initial center in 1965. After a while, Hasan married the sister of Yousef. Yousef trained for an about two-month period in England Chieftain tank. He also accepted the responsibility of spying and reporting on Hasan Aghareb Parast because the intelligence service of that time was suspicious to him. . "There is no miscase and the first lieutenant Hasan Aghareb parast is so loyal to his country and Shah" said by first lieutenant Yousef kolahdouz. He married Zahra Mouzarani in the summer of 1973.

== Tehran-Imperial Guard (Iran) ==
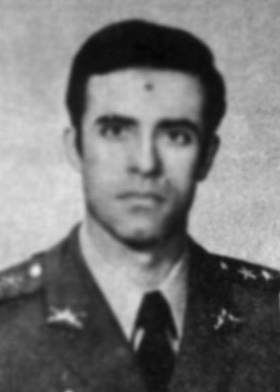
Kolahdouz in Imperial Army uniform

Yousef went to Tehran in 1974. he was selected as a member of Imperial Guard there. He was familiar with Ali Zabetian, a religious man and officer. Yousef and his family, by guiding of Ali Zabetain, could rent an apartment in Tehran. the intelligence service of that time, described Yousef as Dianthus, in Persian by the name of "Gole Mikhak". Later, Yousef along with Toutiani participated more in political activity against shah regime by the aim of overthrow of the Pahlavi dynasty. He also was familiar with Hassan Ayatan Iranian Shia theologian and politician. During the Ashura days in 1979 Iran, Kolahdouz took part in political activity against Shah such that was designed as schema against the operation of repressing of demonstrators. This schema was to execute forcing group in Imperial Guard. This group also designed a plan for assassinating the high rank officers of shah. During the Lavizan event, killed approximately seventy of officers by corporation of Kolahdouz and his old men namely Hasan Zadeh and Omidi abed. the news on this important event was distributed by Kolahdouz amongst media. This enterprise led to lose the repressing operation. Kolahdouz along with Namjoo and Hasan Aghareb Parast comprised the first committee in welcoming to Ruhollah Khomeini. They also talked about conditions of Army in committee. One of the most important discussion was on disbandment of Army.

== Revolution and victory ==
It was near the victory of Revolution of Iran. Yousef was assigned to preserve of arsenal of Lavizan infrastructure. Since that time, establishment of the revolutionary Guard of Iran had been planned. The first place of plannig establishment of Islamic Revolutionary Guard Corps was welcome committee of Khomeini in early days of revolution. After that, a military committee managed to disestablish the Army.

== Establishment of the Islamic Revolutionary Guard Corps ==
Kolahdouz believed that despite the Army, Iran needs to a revolutionary force which preserve of Khomeini and revolution. according to Khomeini's order to Lahouti, the Islamic Revolutionary Guard Corps was established. Yousef early was in charge of training of forces in the IRGC. First he designed three programs on training: three-month program for laymen, one-year program for ones who intend to manage, three-year program for ones who intend to be masters and staffs. Three years programs led to the establishment of Imam Hussein university. Kolahdouz later tried to write the doctrine of IRGC with the help of three ones.

== Sources ==
- Kolahdouz, Hamed (2011). مژه های سوخته [The burned eyelashes] (in Persian). Tehran: center of studies on holy defense. ISBN 978-600-5443-24-0.

Military offices
New title	Deputy Commander-in-Chief of the IRGC; July 1980–29 September 1981	Succeeded by Ali Shamkhani
New title	Chief of the Training Department of the Islamic Revolutionary Guard Corps; 1979–1980	Succeeded by Abbas Duzduzani
