= 64th Infantry Division of Urmia =

- لشکر ۶۴ پیاده ارومیه
- Country: Iran
- Branch: Ground Force
- Type: Infantry
- Role: Combined arms
- Size: Division
- Garrison/HQ: Urmia
- Nicknames: Division of Urmia & 64th Infantry Division
- Engagements: 1979 Kurdish rebellion Iran–Iraq War

Commanders
- Commander in Chief: Governor-General Mohammad-Sadegh Motamedian
- Current commander: Mohsen Nabipour
- unit: 64th Infantry Division of Urmia (Field administrative); 164th Infantry Brigade of Piranshahr; 264th Infantry Brigade of Salmas; 364th Infantry Brigade of Mahabad
- Notable commanders: Qasem-Ali Zahirnejad

The 64th Infantry Division of Urmia (Persian: لشکر ۶۴ پیاده ارومیه) is an infantry division of the Ground Forces of Islamic Republic of Iran Army based in Urmia. Over the 2011–2012 period, it may have become an Operations Headquarters, retaining command of its previous three brigades.

Its dates back to 1921, when it was established by the Imperial Iranian Ground Force and began its activities under the name of the Rezaieh Division.

It was active during the Imperial Iranian regime during the 1970s, as a brigade. During the Iran–Iraq War it was reported at Piranshahr.

Representatives of the Democratic Party of Iranian Kurdistan (DPIK) in New York told the Immigration and Refugee Board of Canada on 16 October 1996 that the 64th Infantry Division of Urmia (and, the Brigade of Salmas) were involved in human rights violations against Kurdish civilians between 1983 and 1988.
