= Valiollah Fallahi =

Iranian general (1931–1981)

Timsar Valiollah Fallahi
- ولی‌الله فلاحی
- General Fallahi c. 1979
- Born: April 30, 1931; Kulej, Taleqan County, Pahlavi Iran
- Died: September 29, 1981 (aged 50); Kahrizak District, Iran
- Military career
- Allegiance: Pahlavi Iran (1951–1979); Iran (1979–1981)
- Branch: Imperial Iranian Ground Force; Islamic Republic of Iran Ground Forces
- Service years: 1951–1981
- Rank: Brigadier General; Major General (posthumously)
- Unit: 92nd Armored Division
- Commands: Deputy Commander-in-Chief of the Iranian Armed Forces (1981–1981); Chief of the Joint Staff (1980–1981); Deputy Chief of the Joint Staff (1980–1981); Ground Forces (1979–1981); Deputy Commander of the Shiraz Infantry, Armored, and Airborne Training Center (1978–1979)
- Conflicts: 1979 Iranian ethnic unrest; 1979 Kurdish rebellion in Iran; Battle of Paveh; 1979 Turkmen rebellion in Iran; 1979 Khuzestan insurgency; 1979 Azeri rebellion in Iran; Nojeh coup plot; Iran–Iraq War; Iraqi invasion; First Battle of Khorramshahr; Operation Fath ol-Mobin; Operation Tariq al-Quds; Operation Samen-ol-A'emeh
- Awards: Order of Nasr

Valiollah Fallahi (Persian: ولی‌الله فلاحی) (1931 – 29 September 1981) was an Iranian military officer and prominent figure during the Iran–Iraq War.

== Early life ==
Valiollah Fallahi was born in 1931 in Village of Kulej, where he completed his primary education before attending the Nezam High School in Tehran.

== Career ==
In October 1951, he entered the Officers' Academy, graduating as a Second Lieutenant in the armored branch. He began his military service in the 92nd Armored Division of Khuzestan.

Due to his opposition to the Pahlavi government, Fallahi was imprisoned four times between 1951 and 1973. Despite this, his strategic intellect and high expertise made him an elite, highly respected officer within the Imperial Iranian Army, earning constant esteem from senior commanders. Holding the rank of Lieutenant Colonel, he served as a United Nations peace monitor for the Vietnam ceasefire from 1972 until mid-1974 alongside a group of Iranian officers. On October 4, 1978, after achieving the rank of Brigadier General, he was transferred to Shiraz to serve as the Deputy Commander of the Shiraz Infantry Center.

=== Deputy Command of the Shiraz Infantry Center ===
The presence of Valiollah Fallahi in Shiraz coincided with the peak of public protests against the Pahlavi regime; consequently, martial law had been declared in most Iranian cities, including Shiraz. Due to Fallahi's efforts, martial law in Shiraz was lifted, army troops were withdrawn from the streets, and the responsibility for maintaining public order was handed over to the Shahrbani.

=== Command of the Army Ground Forces ===
Fallahi served as commander ground forces Following the victory of the 1979 Iranian Revolution. by June 1980 he was the deputy commander of joint staff. He was appointed by Abolhassan Banisadr as joint chief of staff in June 1980.

=== Chief of the Joint Staff ===
Holding the rank of Brigadier General, Valiollah Fallahi was appointed Chief of the Joint Staff of the Army on 19 June 1980, succeeding Major General Shadmehr.

Initially, in the summer of 1980, the Nojeh coup plot emerged within the Air Force and Ground Forces. Alongside countering and suppressing the coup, a widespread purge and clearance of the coup elements were carried out.

With the outbreak of the Iran–Iraq War, due to a lack of combat and operational readiness in the degraded Army units and the chaotic domestic political environment, a major portion of the forces' combat capability had to be expended simply to stall the Iraqi military and halt its advance in the western part of the country and Khuzestan. However, this strategy—which can be summarized as "fighting calmly and deliberately based on military science"—did not sit well with many revolutionaries of that era. Consequently, young revolutionaries accused Fallahi of inaction and a lack of expertise.

== Death ==
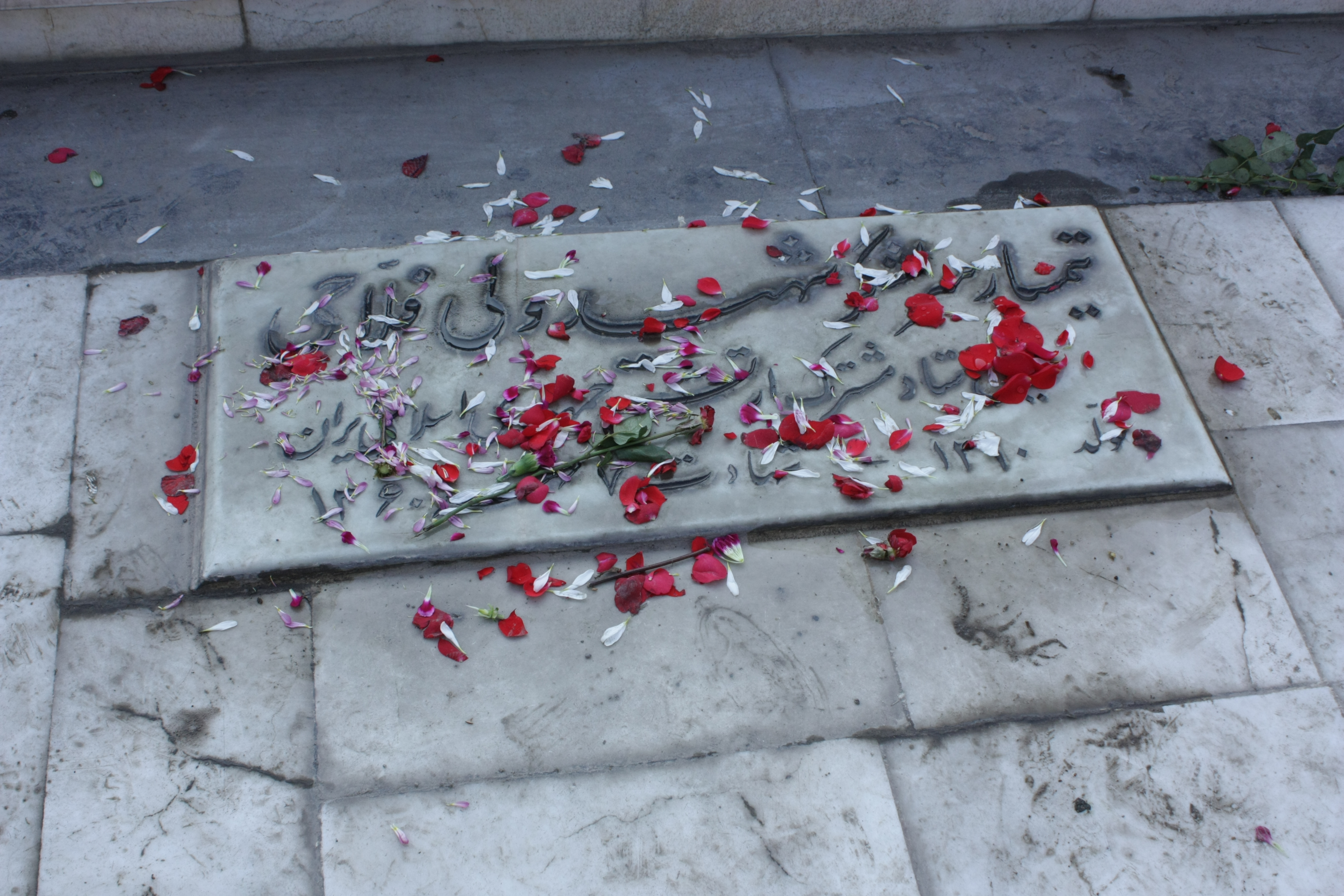
Fallahi's grave

On 29 September 1981, he died along with several other top commanders, including General Javad Fakouri (Air Force Commander), General Yousef Kolahdouz (Acting Commander of the Revolutionary Guards), Colonel Sayyid Mousa Namjoo (Defence Minister) and Commander Jahanara in a plane crash that was due to land in Tehran after takeoff from Ahvaz.

Ayatollah Ruhollah Khomeini made a speech following the incident and made a reference to Mujahedeen Khalq as the perpetrator without clearly condemning the leftist group.

Military offices
Preceded by ?	Deputy Commander of the Shiraz Infantry Center; 4 October 1978–11 February 1979	Succeeded by Mohammad Kalarestaghi
Preceded by Abdol Ali Badrei as Commander of the Imperial Iranian Ground Force	Commander of the Islamic Republic of Iran Ground Forces; 11 February 1979–19 June 1980	Succeeded by Qasem-Ali Zahirnejad
Preceded by Reza Amindari	Deputy Chief of the Joint Staff of the Islamic Republic of Iran Army; 19 June 1980–29 September 1981	Succeeded by Ali-Mardan Khazai
Preceded by Mohammad-Hadi Shadmehr	Acting Chief of the Joint Staff of the Islamic Republic of Iran Army; 19 June 1980–29 September 1981	Succeeded by Qasem-Ali Zahirnejad
Preceded by Office Established	Deputy Commander-in-Chief of the Iranian Armed Forces; 11 June 1981–29 September 1981	Succeeded by Qasem-Ali Zahirnejad
