= Javad Fakoori =

Iranian officer (1936–1981)

Timsar Javad Fakoori
- جواد فکوری
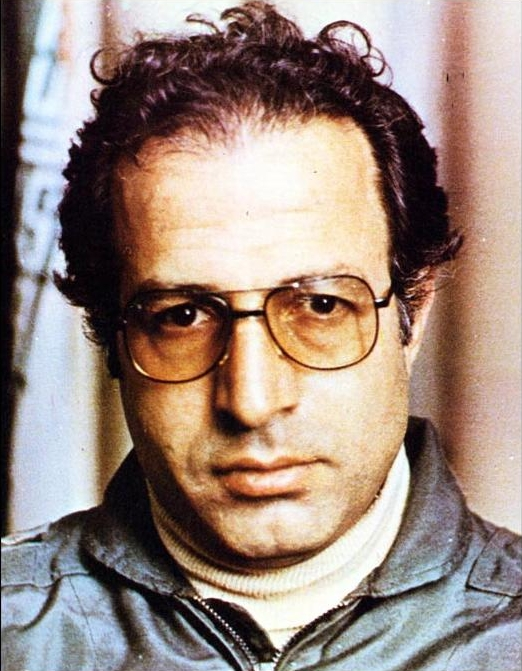
- Fakoori c. 1981

4th Minister of Defense
- In office 10 September 1980 – 17 August 1981
- President: Abolhassan Banisadr; Temporary Presidential Council; Mohammad-Ali Rajai
- Prime Minister: Mohammad-Ali Rajai; Mohammad Javad Bahonar
- Supreme Leader: Ruhollah Khomeini
- Preceded by: Mostafa Chamran
- Succeeded by: Mousa Namjoo

Commander of the Iranian Air Force
- In office July 1980 – 29 September 1981
- President: Abolhassan Banisadr; Temporary Presidential Council; Mohammad-Ali Rajai; Temporary Presidential Council
- Prime Minister: Interim Government of Iran (1979–80); Mohammad-Ali Rajai; Mohammad-Javad Bahonar; Mohammad-Reza Mahdavi Kani
- Supreme Leader: Ruhollah Khomeini
- Preceded by: Amir-Bahman Bagheri
- Succeeded by: Mohammad-Hossein Moeinpour

Deputy Commander of Operations of the Iranian Air Force
- In office June 1980 – July 1980
- President: Abolhassan Banisadr
- Prime Minister: Interim Government of Iran (1979–80)
- Supreme Leader: Ruhollah Khomeini
- Preceded by: ?
- Succeeded by: Mahmoud Gheydayan

Personal details
- Born: 5 February 1938 Tabriz, Imperial State of Iran
- Died: 29 September 1981 (aged 43) Kahrizak, Islamic Republic of Iran
- Spouse: Zhila Zarrekhak
- Children: 3
- Awards: Order of Nasr

Military service
- Allegiance: Pahlavi Iran (1958–1979); Iran (1979–1981)
- Branch/service: Air Force
- Years of service: 1958–1981
- Rank: Colonel; Major General (posthumous)
- Commands: 2nd Tactical Air Base (1979–1980); 1st Tactical Air Base (1980)
- Battles/wars: 1979 Azeri rebellion in Iran; Iran–Iraq War; Operation Kaman 99; H-3 airstrike; Operation Scorch Sword

Javad Fakoori (Persian: جواد فکوری; 5 February 1938 – 29 September 1981) was an Iranian military colonel who served as defense minister of Iran from September 1980 to August 1981.

== Career ==
Fakoori joined the Imperial Iranian Air Force in 1958 as a F-100 fighter pilot. He later led a squadron of F-4 aircraft. By 1978, he was promoted to colonel and stationed in Tehran as a staff officer.

After the Iranian Revolution, he was kidnapped during the Azerbaijani uprising in 1979 but was released two days later. it was found out that one of Fakoori's cousins was a prominent member of the outlawed People's Mojahedin Organization of Iran, and had sought asylum in Sweden. Regardless, then-president Abolhassan Banisadr appointed Fakoori as the minister of national defense in 1980, with the reported consent of Supreme Leader Ruhollah Khomeini. He commanded the newly-formed Islamic Republic of Iran Air Force during the Iran–Iraq War.

== Death ==
Fakoori, alongside senior military officials Valiollah Fallahi and Mousa Namjoo, was killed in an aviation crash near Tehran on 29 September 1981. Khomeini made a speech following the incident, in which he implied the People's Mojahedin Organization to be the perpetrators.

Fakoori was posthumously promoted to the rank of major general.

Military offices
Preceded by Amir-Bahman Bagheri	Commander of the Iranian Air Force; July 1980–29 September 1981	Succeeded by Mohammad-Hossein Moeinpour
Preceded by ?	Deputy Commander of Operations of the Iranian Air Force; June 1980–July 1980	Succeeded by Mahmoud Gheydayan
Government offices
Preceded by Mostafa Chamran	Minister of Defense; 10 September 1980–17 August 1981	Succeeded by Mousa Namjoo
