= Mousa Namjoo =

Iranian military officer and government minister (1938–1981)

Seyyed Timsar Mousa Namjoo
- موسی نامجو

5th Minister of Defence
- In office 17 August 1981 – 29 September 1981
- President: Mohammad-Ali Rajai
- Prime Minister: Mohammad-Javad Bahonar; Mohammad-Reza Mahdavi Kani
- Supreme Leader: Ruhollah Khomeini
- Preceded by: Javad Fakoori
- Succeeded by: Mohammad Salimi

Supreme Leader's Representative at Supreme National Defence Council
- In office 1981–1981
- President: Mohammad-Ali Rajai
- Prime Minister: Mohammad-Ali Rajai; Mohammad-Javad Bahonar; Mohammad-Reza Mahdavi Kani
- Supreme Leader: Ruhollah Khomeini
- Preceded by: Office Established
- Succeeded by: Qasem-Ali Zahirnejad

Director of Imam Ali Officers' Academy
- In office 1979–1981
- President: Abolhassan Banisadr; Mohammad-Ali Rajai
- Prime Minister: Mehdi Bazargan; Mohammad-Ali Rajai; Mohammad-Javad Bahonar; Mohammad-Reza Mahdavi Kani
- Supreme Leader: Ruhollah Khomeini
- Preceded by: Sadegh Mahmoudi
- Succeeded by: Ali Sayad Shirazi

Personal details
- Born: 17 December 1938 Bandar-e Anzali, Imperial State of Iran
- Died: 29 September 1981 (aged 42) Kahrizak, Islamic Republic of Iran
- Education: Officers' School
- Awards: Order of Nasr

Military service
- Allegiance: Pahlavi Iran (1958–1979); Iran (1979–1981)
- Branch/service: Ground Force
- Years of service: 1958–1981
- Rank: Colonel; Major General (posthumously)
- Battles/wars: Iran–Iraq War

Mousa Namjoo (Persian: موسی نامجو; 17 December 1938 – 29 September 1981) was an Iranian military officer who served as the minister of defence from 17 August to 29 September 1981.

== Biography ==
Namjoo was born in Bandar-e Anzali on 17 December 1938. He graduated from Officers' School. He was married and had three children.

He worked at the National Military Academy with the rank of colonel. He was instrumental in developing a cooperation between the Islamic Revolutionary Guard Corps and Army before and during the Iran–Iraq War. He also fought in the war. He was appointed minister of defence and armed forces logistics to the interim government led by Prime Minister Mohammad-Reza Mahdavi Kani on 2 September 1981.

== Death ==
Namjoo was killed in a plane crash together with 80 other people on 29 September 1981 near Tehran. The aircraft was a US-made C-130 Hercules transport plane. Other leading military figures killed in the crash were Valiollah Fallahi, Javad Fakoori and Yousef Kolahdouz. They were returning to Tehran from southwestern battlefront with Iraq. On 1 October 1981, a funeral service was held for Namjoo and other victims at the military academy in Tehran.

Ayatollah Ruhollah Khomeini made a speech following the incident indicating the Mujahedeen Khalq as the perpetrator without clearly condemning the leftist group.

== Legacy ==
Namjoo's biography entitled A Man with Orange Color was published by Ezzatollah Alvandi in 2005.

Military offices
Preceded by Sadegh Mahmoudi; Acting	Commander of the Officer Academy; 1979 – 1981	Succeeded by Ali Sayad Shirazi
Government offices
New title	Supreme Leader's Representative at Supreme National Defence Council; 1981; Served alongside: Ali Khamenei	Vacant Title next held by Qasem-Ali Zahirnejad
Political offices
Preceded by Javad Fakoori	Minister of Defense; 17 August 1981 – 29 September 1981	Succeeded by Mohammad Salimi
