= Interim Presidential Council =

- شورای موقت ریاست‌جمهوری
- Emblem of the Islamic Republic of Iran

- Flag of the Islamic Republic of Iran
- Type: Third time: Arranger of new presidential elections First and second time: Temporarily took over the duties of the President, (Note: Until 1989, the President wasn't the head of government) duing vacancy of the President and arranger of new presidential elections
- Term length: 50 days in which the new President is elected and appointed
- Formation: 22 June 1981 (first time); 30 August 1981 (second time); 19 May 2024 (third time)
- Abolished: 2 August 1981 (first time); 9 October 1981 (second time); 28 July 2024 (third time)

In the Islamic Republic of Iran, an Interim Presidential Council, (Note: Persian: شورای موقت ریاست‌جمهوری) also known as Presidential Council, is formed when the office of President of Iran is prematurely vacated by either death, resignation or for other reasons. The body is tasked with arranging presidential elections within a maximum period of fifty days,

The council consists of the Speaker of the Islamic Consultative Assembly, the Chief Justice, and the first vice president (until 1989 the Prime Minister). If one of these positions is vacant at the time the Presidential Council is formed, the Supreme Leader appoints another person in his place,

The first vice president also performs the duties President during the vacancy. Before the establishment of that office, the Presidential council performed the Presidential duties during the vacancy, on the other hand one source claims that during the second council the prime minister took over the duties of the president.

== Members ==
First council

- Prime Minister: Mohammad-Ali Rajai
- Speaker of the Islamic Consultative Assembly: Akbar Hashemi Rafsanjani
- Chief Justice:
  - Mohammad Beheshti (assassinated on 28 June 1981)
  - Abdul-Karim Mousavi Ardebili

Second council

- Prime Minister:
  - vacant
  - Mohammad-Reza Mahdavi Kani appointed
- Speaker of the Islamic Consultative Assembly: Akbar Hashemi Rafsanjani
- Chief Justice: Abdul-Karim Mousavi Ardebili

Third council

- First Vice President (Acting President): Mohammad Mokhber
- Speaker of the Islamic Consultative Assembly: Mohammad Bagher Ghalibaf
- Chief Justice: Gholam-Hossein Mohseni-Eje'i

== See also ==
- List of Presidents of Iran
- Interim Leadership Council
