= Mohsen Rafighdoost =

Iranian politician

Sardar Mohsen Rafighdoost
- محسن رفیقدوست
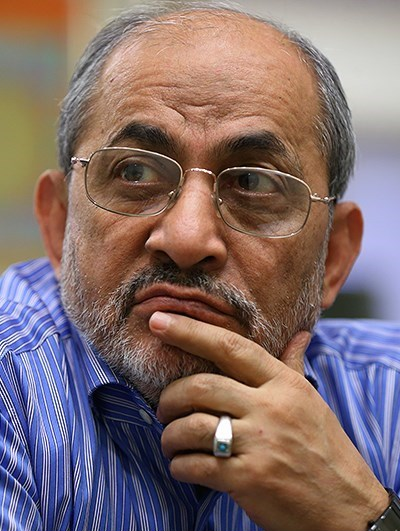
- Rafighdoost in 2015

Head of Mostazafan Foundation
- In office 6 September 1989 – 22 July 1999
- Appointed by: Ali Khamenei
- President: Akbar Hashemi Rafsanjani; Mohammad Khatami
- Supreme Leader: Ali Khamenei
- Preceded by: Mir-Hossein Mousavi
- Succeeded by: Mohammad Forouzandeh

Minister of Revolutionary Guards
- In office 9 November 1982 – 13 September 1988
- President: Ali Khamenei
- Prime Minister: Mir-Hossein Mousavi
- Supreme Leader: Ruhollah Khomeini
- Preceded by: Ministry founded
- Succeeded by: Mahmoud Pakravan (acting); Ali Shamkhani

Personal details
- Born: 1940 (age 85–86) Tehran, Pahlavi Iran
- Party: Islamic Coalition Party
- Awards: Order of Nasr

Military service
- Allegiance: Iran
- Branch/service: Islamic Revolutionary Guard Corps
- Years of service: 1979–present
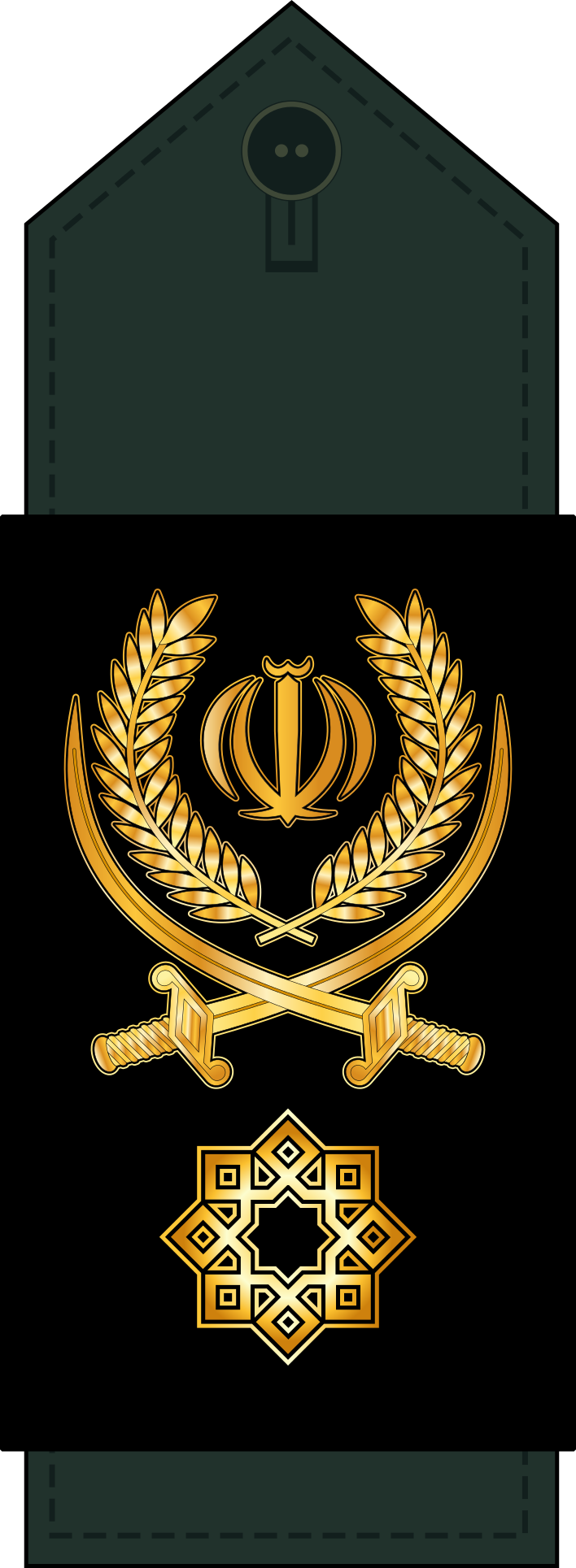
- Rank: Brigadier General
- Battles/wars: Iran–Iraq War

Mohsen Rafighdoust (also Rafiqdoust, Persian: محسن رفیقدوست) is an Iranian military officer in the Revolutionary Guards and conservative politician. He is a member of the Islamic Coalition Party.

== Early life ==
Rafighdoost was born around 1940 in south Tehran. His family background is that of a bazaari, the traditional class of people who work in the bazaar. His father was a fruit and vegetable merchant at the Tehran bazaar. His family was very religious and close to Ruhollah Khomeini. In 1953, Rafighdoost was expelled from secondary school due to his pro-Mosaddegh activities.

== Military career ==
Mohsen Rafighdoost was the head of Ruhollah Khomeini's security detail in 1979 during the Iranian Revolution, and helped found the Revolutionary Guards who helped eliminate opposition to theocratic rule in the Islamic Republic.

He drove Ruhollah Khomeini, the leader of the (Iranian) Revolution, from Tehran international airport into Tehran, during Khomeini's triumphant return to Iran from France, while hundreds of Iranians crowded the road to welcome Khomeini back. He later said that this was the most important day of his life and "crowds were all over the car, touching and hanging on to it."

He served from 1982 to 1988 as Minister of the Revolutionary Guards, during which time he put down internal dissent and obtained weapons from foreign countries for the Iran–Iraq War.

Rafighdoost said in a 2014 interview that he twice suggested to Ali Khamenei that Iran develop weapons of mass destruction to counter their use by Saddam Hussein. Rafighdoost claimed that both times Ali Khamenei rejected the idea, reasoning that it would be against Islam.

== Business career ==
In 1989 he was appointed head of the Mostazafan Foundation or Bonyad-e Mostazafen va Janbazan (Foundation of the Oppressed), "the second-largest commercial enterprise" in Iran behind the state-owned National Iranian Oil Company where he remained until 1999.

Since 1999, Mohsen Rafighdoost has been the Director of the Noor Foundation. The Foundation reportedly owns apartment blocks and "makes an estimated $200 million importing pharmaceuticals, sugar and construction materials."

== Interviews ==
In a television interview, conducted on 8 March 2025, the former minister of the Iranian Revolutionary Guard Corps (IRGC), admitted that Iran was responsible for assassinating dissidents abroad, confirming that he personally oversaw some of these operations. He revealed that the funding for these assassinations came from profits made through arms trade during the Iran-Iraq War.

Some of the key figures targeted included:

- General Gholam-Ali Oveisi, former military governor of Tehran during the September 1978 protests, assassinated in Paris in 1984.
- Fereydoun Farrokhzad, a poet and television presenter during the Shah’s era, assassinated in Germany in 1992.
- Shapour Bakhtiar, the last Prime Minister under the Shah, assassinated in Paris in 1991.

These revelations shed light on the IRGC’s involvement in international assassinations against Iranian opposition figures.

== Personal life ==
In 1995, Mohsen Rafighdoost's brother, Morteza Rafighdoost, was sentenced to ten years imprisonment for bank fraud. After this, Supreme Leader Ali Khamenei appointed a board of trustees and made the Bonyad-e Mostazafen va Janbazan subject to parliamentary scrutiny.

Rafighdoost's personal fortune is said to be worth the equivalent of many millions of dollars. When asked about his personal wealth, Rafighdoost has responded: "I am just a normal person, with normal wealth, but if Islam is threatened, I will become big again."
