= Badges of honor in Iran =

This is a list about all badges of honor in Iran. The list contains badges and medals of the monarchy and government of the Qajar dynasty, Pahlavi dynasty and Government of the Islamic Republic of Iran which have special ratings and classes.

== Qajar dynasty badges ==
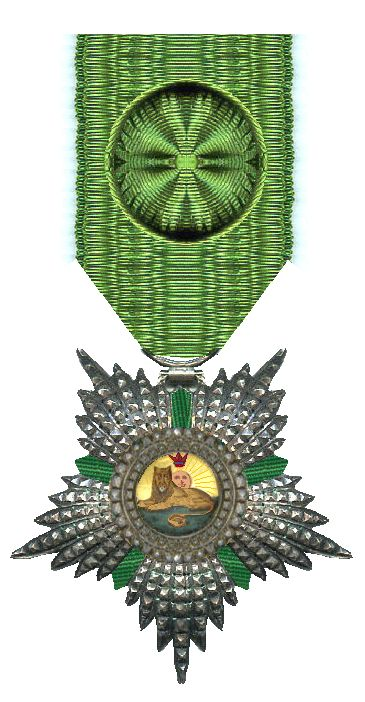
Order of the Lion and the Sun

The Qajar dynasty was an Iranian royal dynasty of Turkic origin, specifically from the Qajar tribe, ruling over Iran from 1789 to 1925. These badges used in the Qajar period and can be divided into two categories:

1. Badges of swordsmen (Persian: نشان‌های شمشیربندان)
2. Badges of prominents (Persian: نشان‌های سرشناسان)

The swordsmanship badges had eight levels in the following order:

1. Noyan A'zam badge (Persian: نشان نویان اعظم, For Lords)
2. Amir Tumani badge (Persian: نشان امیرتومانی, For Major-generals)
3. Sartippi badge (Persian: نشان سرتیپی, For Brigadier-generals)
4. Sarhangi badge (Persian: نشان سرهنگی, For Colonels)
5. Yavari badge (Persian: نشان یاوری, For Majors)
6. Soltani badge (Persian: نشان سلطانی, For Captains)
7. Nayebi badge (Persian: نشان نایبی, For Lieutenants)
8. Vakil badge (Persian: نشان وکیل, For Sergeants)

The badges were in the form of a baldric with colored ribbons, at the bottom of which a medal with the image of Lion and Sun was hung. The importance of the badge was recognized by their color. The blue colors belonged to the kings and the green colors belonged to Lords (Noyan A'zam), red to Major-generals (Amir Tumani) and Brigadier-generals (Sartippi) and white to the colonels (Sarhangi).

From another badges that used in this period include:

- Order of the effigy of Amir al-Mu'minin (Persian: نشان تمثال امیرالمؤمنین, Especially for Qajar kings and princes)
- Order of Aqdas in three classes:
  - Order of Aqdas (Most Sacred - 1st class, Persian: نشان اقدس, Called first class Lion and Sun badge until 1893,)
  - Order of Qods (Very Sacred - 2nd class, Persian: نشان قدس, Called second class Lion and Sun badge until 1893,)
  - Order of Moghaddas (Sacred - 3rd class, Persian: نشان مقدس, Called third class Lion and Sun badge until 1893,)
- Order of the effigy of Homayoun (Persian: نشان تمثال همایون, For First-class foreign officials)
- Order of the Crown (Persian: نشان تاج, In two classes until 1926,)
- Order of the Lion and the Sun (Persian: نشان شیر و خورشید ایران, In 5 classes from 1893,)
- Order of Aftab (Persian: نشان آفتاب, For women in two classes,)
- Order of Zolfaghar (Persian: نشان ذوالفقار, Military order,)
- Order of Jaladat (Persian: نشان جلادت, Military order in three classes,)
- Order of Sepah (Persian: نشان سپه, In three classes)
- Order of Science (Persian: نشان علمی)
- Order of Toopkhaneh (Persian: نشان توپخانه)
- Order of 10 Tumani Tala (Persian: نشان ده توماني طلا)
- Order of Noghreh (Persian: نشان نقره)
- Order of Bombaran Majles (Persian: نشان بمباران مجلس)
- Order of Reshadat (Persian: نشان رشادت)
- Gold Order with the image of Ahmad Shah (Persian: نشان طلا با تصوير احمد شاه)
- Military Order of Bronze (Persian: نشان نظامي برنز)
- Order of Officers (Persian: نشان افسران جزء)
- Gold Order for Commanders (Persian: نشان طلا مخصوص امراء)
- Orders of Mashroutiat (Persian: نشان‌های مشروطيت)

== Badges of the Pahlavi dynasty ==
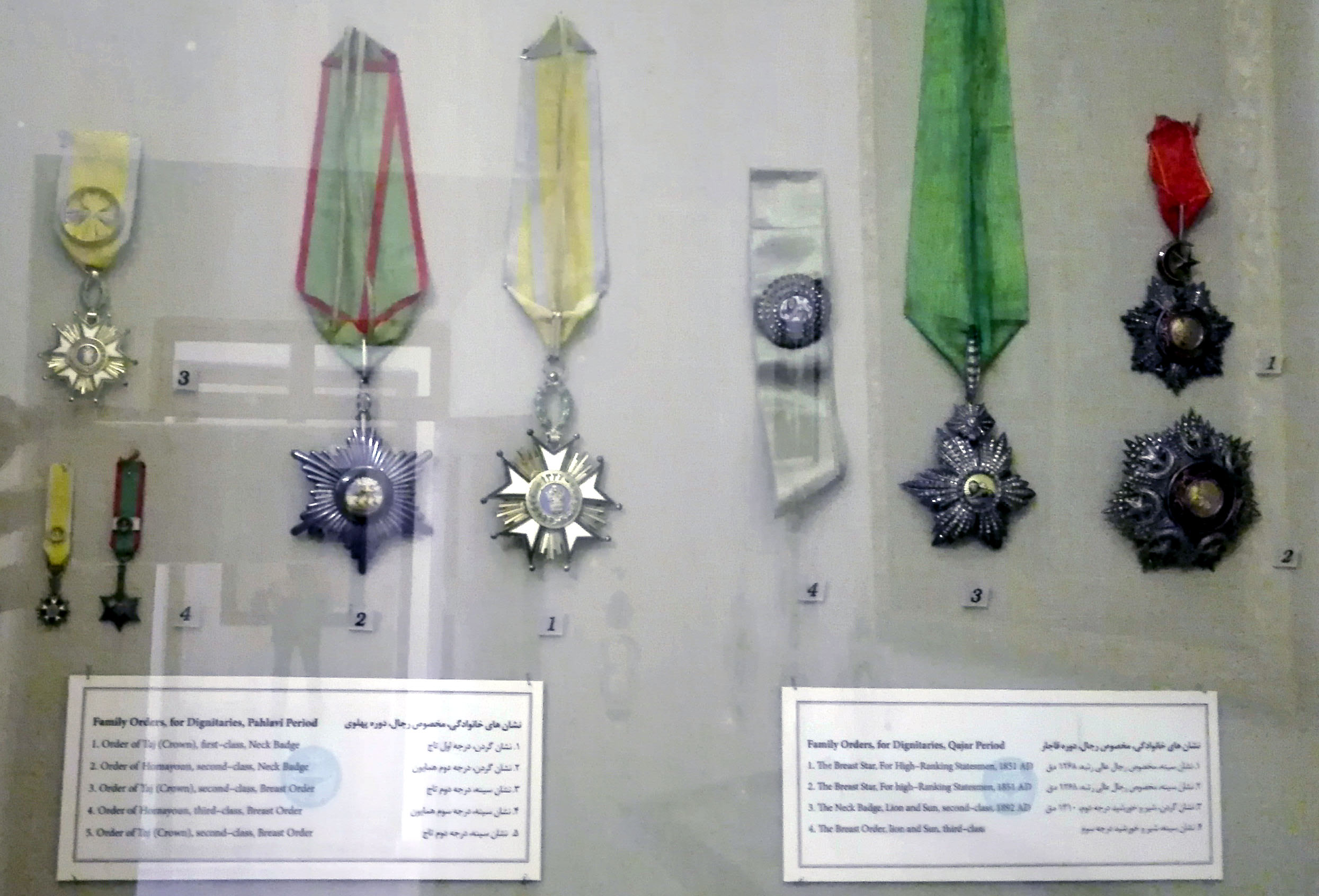
Some badges from Pahlavi dynasty and Qajar dynasty in Moghaddam Museum

The Pahlavi dynasty, the last ruling house of Iran, from 1925 until 1979, used these badges:

- Order of Pahlavi (Persian: نشان پهلوی, In two classes,)
- Order of Zolfaghar (Persian: نشان ذوالفقار, Military order,)
- Order of Aryamehr (Persian: نشان آریامهر, For the ladies of the royal family in two classes,)
- Order of the Crown (Persian: نشان تاج, In five classes,)
- Order of the Pleiades (Persian: نشان هفت‌پیکر, For women in three classes,)
- Order of Homayoun (Persian: نشان همایون, In four classes,)
- Order of Third Isfand (Persian: نشان سوم اسفند, Only one class,)
- Order of the Red Lion and the Sun (Persian: نشان شیر و خورشید سرخ ایران, In five classes,)
- Order of Sepah (Persian: نشان سپه, In three classes,)
- Order of Paas (Persian: نشان پاس, In three classes,)
- Order of Avicenna (Persian: نشان ابن‌سینا, For medical staff of army in three classes,)
- Military Order of Merit (Persian: نشان لیاقت نظامی, Military order in two types and three classes include medals,)
- Order of Eftekhar (Persian: نشان افتخار, Military order in three classes,)
- Military Order of Service (Persian: نشان خدمت نظامی, Military order in three classes include medals,)
- Order of Splendor (Persian: نشان درخش, For urban protection staff in three classes,)
- Order of Knowledge (Persian: نشان دانش, In three classes,)
- Order of Art (Persian: نشان هنر,)
- Order of Javid (Persian: نشان جاوید, For bodyguard staff,)
- Order of Azarabadegan (Persian: نشان آذرآبادگان, For fighters in Azerbaijan crisis of 1946,)
- Order of 28th Mordad (Persian: نشان ۲۸ مرداد, For fighters in 1953 Iranian coup d'état,)
- Order of Effort (Persian: نشان کوشش, For urban protection staff in three classes include medals,)
- Medal of Bravery (Persian: مدال شجاعت, For non-military gunmen who cooperated with the army,)
- Order of Three Stars of Service (Persian: نشان سه ستاره خدمت, For urban protection staff in three classes,)
- Order of Razi (Persian: نشان رازی, Special order of the army medical staff in two classes,)
- Order of Years of Service (Persian: نشان سنین خدمت, For urban protection staff in three classes,)
- Order of Glory (Persian: نشان سربلندی, For the family of the martyrs,)
- Medal of Reward (Persian: مدال پاداش, For good service with special conditions,)
- Medal of Corpsman (Persian: مدال سپاهی, For good technical service with special conditions,)
- Medal of Farr (Persian: مدال فرّ, For good service with special conditions,)
- Grand Order of Tir (Persian: نشان عالی تیر, For best experts in shooting competitions in three classes,)
- Order of Marksmanship (Persian: نشان تیراندازی, For championship position in shooting competitions with three types and three classes,)
- Order of Sport Services (Persian: نشان خدمات ورزشی, For good sport services in three classes,)
- 25th Anniversary of the Mohammad Reza Shah's Reign Medal (Persian: نشان ۲۵امین سالگرد سلطنت محمدرضا پهلوی, Order of Persepolis,)
- 2,500 Year Celebration of the Persian Empire Medal (Persian: نشان جشن‌های ۲۵۰۰ ساله,)
- Coronation Commemorative Order (Persian: نشان یادگار تاج‌گذاری, To commemorate the coronation day,)
- Order of Rastakhiz Party (Persian: نشان حزب رستاخیز, In three classes,)
- Order of Land Reforms (Persian: نشان اصلاحات ارضی, In three classes,)
- Order of Endeavor (Persian: نشان تلاش, For urban protection staff,)
- Order of Cooperation (Persian: نشان همکاری, In three classes,)
- Order of Tir (Persian: نشان تیر,)
- Order of P.T.T. Ministry (Persian: نشان وزارت پ.ت.ت,)

== Badges of the Islamic Republic ==
=== Government Orders of the Islamic Republic of Iran ===
The Government of the Islamic Republic of Iran is the ruling state and current political system in Iran, in power since the Islamic revolution and fall of the Pahlavi dynasty in 1979.

Government Orders of the Islamic Republic of Iran are state badges (country) that are awarded to qualified individuals, whether citizens of Iran or foreign nationals, in accordance with the provisions of the by-laws. The order of the "Order of Islamic Revolution" as the highest badge of the Islamic Republic of Iran is for the then President. Other badges are given by the President on the proposal of the relevant ministers and with the approval of the Council of Ministers. The badges of the Islamic Republic in order of precedence are as follows:

A - Excellence Orders

1. Order of Islamic Revolution (Persian: نشان انقلاب اسلامی, The highest honorary order in the Islamic Republic of Iran given to the President at the ceremony of the presidential inauguration,)
2. Order of Independence (Persian: نشان استقلال, For who playing a key role in achieving high goals of the Islamic Republic of Iran,)
3. Order of Freedom (Persian: نشان آزادی, For who hold one of the first order of General or Expertise awards and continue to be qualified to serve the sacred aims of the Islamic system,)
4. Order of Islamic Republic (Persian: نشان جمهوری اسلامی, For the heads and other officials of foreign countries, In three classes,)

B - Expertise Orders

1. Order of Knowledge (Persian: نشان دانش, For individuals who have made significant and unprecedented efforts to improve the country's scientific performance, In three classes,)
2. Order of Research (Persian: نشان پژوهش, For individuals who have been the origin of fundamental transformation or rare service, In three classes,)
3. Order of Merit and Management (Persian: نشان لیاقت و مدیریت, For who achieve "an exceptional success in management, distinguished activities, aiding the oppressed and deprived people and/or beneficiary use of utilities and/or offering exquisite ways, In three classes,)
4. Order of Justice (Persian: نشان عدالت, For who have contributed to the enforcement of divine decrees and the establishment of law and justice in society, In three classes,)

C - General Orders

1. Order of Construction (Persian: نشان سازندگی, For who have made significant efforts in country's development, In three classes,)
2. Order of Service (Persian: نشان خدمت, For who achieving distinguished success, In three classes,)
3. Order of Work and Production (Persian: نشان کار و تولید, For who have achieved remarkable results in industry or agriculture, In three classes,)
4. Order of Courage (Persian: نشان شجاعت, For courage, a high characteristic of human in achieving distinguished success, In three classes,)
5. Order of Altruism (Persian: نشان ایثار, For who have distinguished effort and self-sacrifice for the sacred aims of the Islamic system, In three classes,)
6. Order of Education and Pedagogy (Persian: نشان تعلیم و تربیت, For who have demonstrated competence in educational fields, In three classes,)
7. Order of Culture and Art (Persian: نشان فرهنگ و هنر, For who "facilitate theirs thinking, passions and emotions to express deep Islamic and humanitarian concepts and to spread culture", In three classes,)
8. Order of Mehr (Persian: نشان مهر, For women who are source of valuable works in social, economic and political affairs, In three classes,)
9. Order of Persian Politeness (Persian: نشان ادب پارسی, For who have significant attributes or efforts in literary fields, In three classes,)

==== National medals ====
- National Medals of Appreciation (Persian: نشان ملی سپاس, The National Medal of Appreciation is to honor scientists who have shown significant contributions to the development of the country, In Golden and Silver classes)
- National Medals of Memorial (Persian: نشان ملی یادمان, The National Medal of Memorial is to honor those who lost their lives defending the country, In Golden and Silver classes)

=== General Staff of the Armed Forces of the Islamic Republic of Iran ===
Supreme Orders

- Order of Fath (Persian: نشان فتح, For the warriors with remarkable victory, In three classes,)
- Order of Nasr (Persian: نشان نصر, For good support of the effective forces in combat services, support activities and veterans, In three classes,)
- Order of Shafa (Persian: نشان شفا, For aid workers who have risked their lives to save lives)

General Orders

- Order of Zolfaghar (Persian: نشان ذوالفقار, Iran's highest military order for great commanders,)
- Order of Sacrifice (Persian: نشان ایثار, Awarded for courage in battles,)
- Order of Veteran (Persian: نشان جانبازی, Awarded for courage in battles,)
- Order of Courage (Persian: نشان شجاعت, Awarded for courage in battles,)
- Order of Jihad (Persian: نشان جهاد, Merit and Skill award,)
- Order of Glory (IRIA) (Persian: نشان سربلندی, For the family of the martyrs,)
- Order of Merit (IRIA) (Persian: نشان لیاقت, Merit and Skill award,)
- Order of Knowledge (IRIA) (Persian: نشان دانش, Merit and Skill award,)
- Order of Razi (IRIA) (Persian: نشان رازی, Merit and Skill award,)
- Order of Art (Persian: نشان هنر, For activists of the Armed Forces in cultural and artistic affairs, In three classes,)
- Order of Sport (IRIA) (Persian: نشان ورزش, For good sport services in army, Only one class,)

== See also ==
- List of national symbols of Iran
- Iranian Army Branch Insignia
- Islamic Revolutionary Guard Corps Branch Insignia
- Iranian Police Branch Insignia
