= Order of Islamic Revolution =

Highest honorary order in Iran

Excellent Order of Islamic Revolution
- Type: National order
- Established: by Council of Iran Ministers on November 21, 1990
- Country: Islamic Republic of Iran
- Ribbon
- Awarded by: Supreme Leader of Iran

The Order of Islamic Revolution (Persian: نشان عالی انقلاب اسلامی) is the highest order of the honorary orders in the Islamic Republic of Iran, established by "Council of Iran Ministers" on November 21, 1990. According to "Article 2" of the "Regulations on the Awarding of Government Orders" of Iran, the "Order of Islamic Revolution" is one number for each presidential term which is being given to the President of Iran at the ceremony of the presidential inauguration.

== Recipients ==
- Mohammad Khatami (1997)
- Mahmoud Ahmadinejad (2005)
- Hassan Rouhani (2013)
- Ebrahim Raisi (2021)
- Masoud Pezeshkian (2024)

== See also ==
- Order of Merit and Management
- Order of Freedom (Iran)
- Order of Altruism
- Order of Work and Production
- Order of Research
- Order of Mehr
- Order of Justice (Iran)
- Order of Construction
- Order of Knowledge
- Order of Education and Pedagogy
- Order of Persian Politeness
- Order of Independence (Iran)
- Order of Courage (Iran)
