= Order of Research =

Iranian award of honor

- Iran National Order

Awarded by President of Iran
- Type: Expertise Award, Badge of honor
- Established: By Council of Iran Ministers in November 21, 1990
- Country: Iran
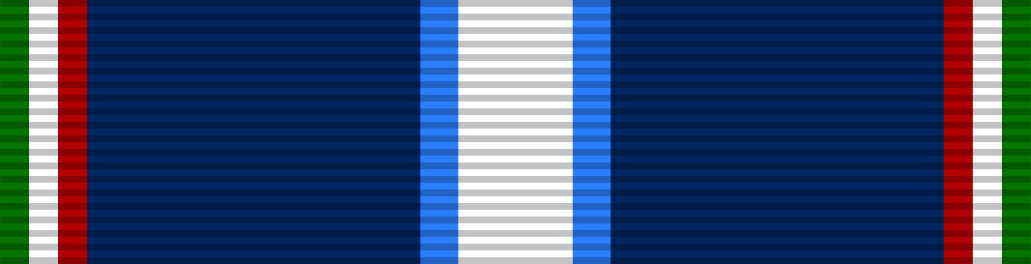
- Ribbon
- Grades: First Order; Second Order; Third Order

Order of Research (Persian: نشان پژوهش) is one of the badges of honor in Iran, established by "Council of Iran Ministers" on November 21, 1990. According to "Article 8" of the "Regulations on the Awarding of Government Orders" of Iran, the "Order of Research" is awarded to individuals who have been the origin of fundamental transformation or rare service in the following ways:

1. Introducing new research methods and techniques
2. Studies and research that are the source of scientific change
3. Finding new research methods
4. Transfer of fundamental research to applied fields
5. Every important innovation, originality, invention, and discovery

== Recipients ==
No.	Recipient Name	Badge	Type	Donator	Date
1.	Manouchehr Manteghi	Order of Research	Third Order	Akbar Hashemi Rafsanjani	February 24, 1995
2.	Fereydoon Azizi	Order of Research	Third Order	Akbar Hashemi Rafsanjani	May 1, 1995
3.	Hossein Mirshamsi	Order of Research	First Order	Akbar Hashemi Rafsanjani	May 29, 1995
4.	Azim Akbari	Order of Research	Third Order	Akbar Hashemi Rafsanjani	June 20, 1995
5.	Ahang Kowsar	Order of Research	Third Order	Akbar Hashemi Rafsanjani	June 24, 1996
6.	Fathollah Moztarzadeh	Order of Research	Third Order	Akbar Hashemi Rafsanjani	November 27, 1996
7.	Majid Abbaspour Tehrani	Order of Research	Third Order	Akbar Hashemi Rafsanjani	January 9, 1997
8.	Vafa Ghaffarian	Order of Research	Third Order	Akbar Hashemi Rafsanjani	January 28, 1997
9.	Abbas Owlia	Order of Research	Second Order	Akbar Hashemi Rafsanjani	June 17, 1997
10.	Mehdi Sohrabi	Order of Research	Third Order	Akbar Hashemi Rafsanjani	June 17, 1997
11.	Nasrin Moazami	Order of Research	Third Order	Akbar Hashemi Rafsanjani	June 17, 1997
12.	Abbas Shafiee	Order of Research	Second Order	Mohammad Khatami	June 9, 1999
13.	Mojtaba Shamsipour	Order of Research	Third Order	Mohammad Khatami	January 9, 2003
14.	Gholamreza Rajabi	Order of Research	Third Order	Mohammad Khatami	January 9, 2003
15.	Jafar Ershad	Order of Research	Third Order	Mohammad Khatami	August 3, 2004
16.	Mohammadhossein Alimohammadian	Order of Research	Third Order	Mohammad Khatami	August 3, 2004
17.	Fereshteh Motamedi	Order of Research	Third Order	Mohammad Khatami	August 3, 2004
18.	Reza Hashemi Fesharaki	Order of Research	Second Order	Mohammad Khatami	June 6, 2005
19.	Jaber Safdari	Order of Research	Third Order	Mohammad Khatami	June 7, 2005
20.	Mohammad Ghanadi Maragheh	Order of Research	Third Order	Mohammad Khatami	June 7, 2005
21.	Nahid Khodabandeh	Order of Research	Third Order	Mohammad Khatami	June 7, 2005
22.	Hamidreza Mohajerani Araqi	Order of Research	Third Order	Mahmoud Ahmadinejad	August 27, 2006
23.	Mohammad Ghanadi Maragheh	Order of Research	Second Order	Mahmoud Ahmadinejad	August 27, 2006
24.	Javad Karimi Sabet	Order of Research	Third Order	Mahmoud Ahmadinejad	August 27, 2006
25.	Haleh Bakhtiari	Order of Research	Third Order	Mahmoud Ahmadinejad	August 27, 2006
26.	Mohammad Ali Zolfigol	Order of Research	Second Order	Mahmoud Ahmadinejad	October 7, 2011
27.	Mahdi Balali-Mood	Order of Research	Second Order	Mahmoud Ahmadinejad	October 26, 2011
28.	Ali Akbar Ghoreishi	Order of Research	First Order	Mahmoud Ahmadinejad	March 6, 2012
29.	Homayoon Hemmati	Order of Research	Second Order	Mahmoud Ahmadinejad	March 6, 2012
30.	Adel Azar	Order of Research	Second Order	Mahmoud Ahmadinejad	March 6, 2012

== Types ==
The "Order of Research" has three types of medal:

First Order Medal

Second Order Medal

Third Order Medal

== See also ==
- Order of Freedom (Iran)
- Order of Altruism
- Order of Work and Production
- Order of Mehr
- Order of Justice (Iran)
- Order of Construction
- Order of Knowledge
- Order of Education and Pedagogy
- Order of Persian Politeness
- Order of Independence (Iran)
- Order of Service
- Order of Courage (Iran)
- Order of Culture and Art
- Order of Merit and Management
- Order of Fath
- Order of Islamic Republic
- Order of Nasr
