= Order of Justice (Iran) =

Iranian award of honor

- Iran National Order

Awarded by President of Iran
- Type: Expertise Award, Badge of honor
- Established: By Council of Iran Ministers in November 21, 1990
- Country: Iran
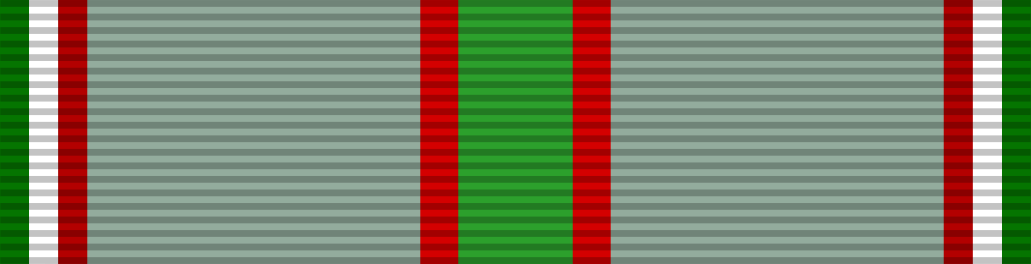
- Ribbon
- Grades: First Order; Second Order; Third Order

Order of Justice (Persian: نشان عدالت) is one of the badges of honor in Iran, established by " The Council of Iran Ministers" on November 21, 1990. According to "Article 10" of the "Regulations on the Awarding of Government Orders" of Iran, the "Order of Justice" is awarded to those who have contributed to the enforcement of divine decrees and the establishment of law and justice in society or who have a good judicial and aptitude record, in some of the following ways:

1. Scientific and technical work on the formulation of laws
2. Brilliant history in judiciary or legislative
3. Defending truth, justice, and the rights of people
4. Detection and prosecution of crimes

== Recipients ==
No.	Recipient Name	Badge	Type	Donator	Date
1.	Abbasgholi Ahmadi	Order of Justice	Third Order	Akbar Hashemi Rafsanjani	July 26, 1997
2.	Abbas Alizadeh Bayeki	Order of Justice	Third Order	Akbar Hashemi Rafsanjani	July 26, 1997
3.	Mohammad Mohammadi Gilani	Order of Justice	First Order	Mahmoud Ahmadinejad	June 27, 2009

== Types ==
The "Order of Justice" has three types of medal:

First Order Medal

Second Order Medal

Third Order Medal

== See also ==
- Order of Freedom (Iran)
- Order of Altruism
- Order of Work and Production
- Order of Research
- Order of Mehr
- Order of Construction
- Order of Knowledge
- Order of Education and Pedagogy
- Order of Persian Politeness
- Order of Independence (Iran)
- Order of Service
- Order of Courage (Iran)
- Order of Culture and Art
- Order of Merit and Management
- Order of Fath
- Order of Islamic Republic
- Order of Nasr
