= Order of Mehr =

Iranian award of honor

- Iran National Order

Awarded by President of Iran
- Type: General Award, Badge of honor, Women Award
- Established: By Council of Iran Ministers in September 13, 1994
- Country: Iran
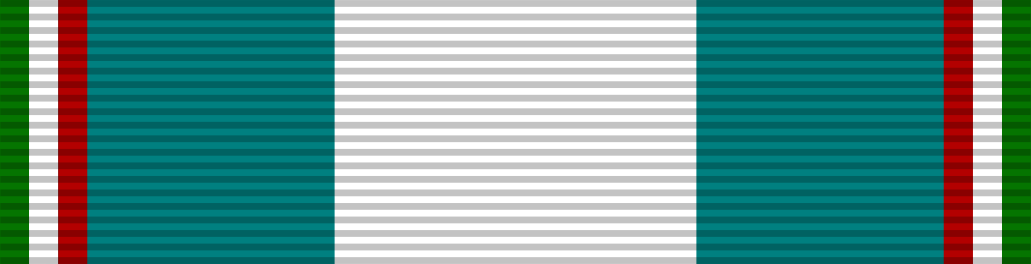
- Ribbon
- Grades: First Order; Second Order; Third Order

Order of Mehr (Persian: نشان مهر) is one of the badges of honor in Iran, established by "Council of Iran Ministers" on September 13, 1994. According to "Article 18" of the "Regulations on the Awarding of Government Orders" of Iran, in addition to the women can having other badges, the "Order of Mehr" due to honor the status and the position of women in the Islamic Republic of Iran, is awarded to women who are source of valuable works in one of the following ways:

1. Constructive and active participation in social, economic and political affairs
2. Introducing the exemplary of Muslim woman in society and trying to explain and promote its ideological and social foundations
3. Practical presentation of the exemplary of excellent mother or spouse, especially among mothers and wives of martyrs, veterans and freedmans who with dedication in maintaining and strengthening the family, have provided outstanding service in cultural, educational, or research areas
4. Expressing competence in the international arena in a way that honors the country and represents the woman personality in the Islamic Republic of Iran

== Recipients ==
No.	Recipient Name	Badge	Type	Donator	Date
1.	Fatemeh Nourizadeh	Order of Mehr	Third Order	Akbar Hashemi Rafsanjani	December 11, 1996
2.	Manijeh Jamshidi Fard	Order of Mehr	Third Order	Akbar Hashemi Rafsanjani	December 11, 1996
3.	Ashraf Boroujerdi	Order of Mehr	Third Order	Mohammad Khatami	January 9, 2003
4.	Monireh Gorji	Order of Mehr	Third Order	Mohammad Khatami	June 7, 2005
5.	Faezeh Azimzadeh Ardabili	Order of Mehr	Third Order	Mahmoud Ahmadinejad	December 24, 2011

== Types ==
The "Order of Mehr" has three types of medal:

First Order Medal

Second Order Medal

Third Order Medal

== See also ==
- Order of Freedom (Iran)
- Order of Altruism
- Order of Research
- Order of Work and Production
- Order of Justice (Iran)
- Order of Construction
- Order of Knowledge
- Order of Education and Pedagogy
- Order of Persian Politeness
- Order of Independence (Iran)
- Order of Service
- Order of Courage (Iran)
- Order of Culture and Art
- Order of Merit and Management
- Order of Fath
- Order of Islamic Republic
- Order of Nasr
