= Medal of Persian Literature =

Iranian award of honor

- Iran National Order

Awarded by President of Iran
- Type: Literary Award, Badge of honor
- Established: By Council of Iran Ministers in November 21, 1990
- Country: Iran
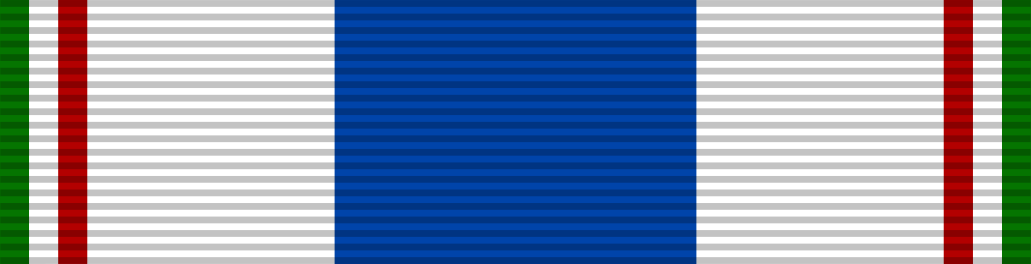
- Ribbon
- Grades: First Order; Second Order; Third Order

Medal of Persian Literature (Persian: نشان ادب پارسی Nešān-e Adab-e Pārsī) is one of the badges of honor in Iran, established by Council of Iran Ministers on November 21, 1990. According to Article 19 of the Regulations on the Awarding of Government Orders of Iran, the Medal of Persian Literature is awarded to persons who have significant attributes or efforts in one of the following fields:

1. Creation of exquisite literary works (whether order or prose)
2. Revival of Iran's literary reserves through analysis or proper presentation of those works
3. Introducing past lecturers and speakers in a way that is effective in the ability to express Persian language and literature
4. Providing acquaintance way to people of the world with Persian language and literature

== Recipients ==
Recipient Name	Badge	Type	Donator	Date
Mehdi Mohaghegh	Order of Persian Politeness	First Order	Mohammad Khatami	March 13, 2004
Salim Neisari	Order of Persian Politeness	First Order	Mahmoud Ahmadinejad	March 2, 2010
Abdolmohammad Ayati	Order of Persian Politeness	First Order	Mahmoud Ahmadinejad	December 24, 2011
Esmaeel Sa'adat	Order of Persian Politeness	First Order	Mahmoud Ahmadinejad	December 24, 2011
Badrozzaman Gharib	Order of Persian Politeness	First Order	Mahmoud Ahmadinejad	December 24, 2011
Fathollah Mojtabaei	Order of Persian Politeness	First Order	Mahmoud Ahmadinejad	December 24, 2011

== Types ==
The Order of Persian Politeness has three types of medal:

First Order Medal

Second Order Medal

Third Order Medal

== See also ==
- Order of Freedom (Iran)
- Order of Altruism
- Order of Work and Production
- Order of Research
- Order of Mehr
- Order of Justice (Iran)
- Order of Construction
- Order of Knowledge
- Order of Education and Pedagogy
- Order of Independence (Iran)
- Order of Service
- Order of Courage (Iran)
- Order of Culture and Art
- Order of Merit and Management
- Order of Fath
- Order of Islamic Republic
- Order of Nasr
