= Order of Art =

Iranian Army award of honor

- The Army order of Art
- Type: National Army Order
- Country: Islamic Republic of Iran
- Ribbon
- Awarded by: Supreme Leader of Iran
- Grades: First Order; Second Order; Third Order

Order of Art (Persian: نشان هنر) is one of the most honorable and customary badges in the Islamic Republic of Iran Armed Forces, which is awarded to encourage activists of the Armed Forces in cultural and artistic affairs.

== The old "Order of Art" ==
In the Pahlavi period (1925 to 1935), Order of Art was a star-shaped symbol with eight feathers around it and a lion and sun sitting in the center of a circle. The background of the central circle was painted with green and blue enamel. The ribbon of the order was also green.

== The "Order of Art" in the Islamic Republic ==
The Order of Art is awarded to activists of the Armed Forces in cultural and artistic affairs in the Islamic Republic of Iran. Among those who received this award is Sorena Sattari, the son of Mansour Sattari, former commander of the Islamic Republic of Iran Air Force, for designing the HESA Azarakhsh jet fighter aircraft.

== See also ==
- Awards and decorations of the Islamic Republic of Iran Armed Forces
- Order of Zolfaghar
- Order of Fath
- Order of Nasr
