= Order of Education and Pedagogy =

Iranian award of honor

- Iran National Order

Awarded by President of Iran
- Type: Education Award, Badge of honor
- Established: By Council of Iran Ministers in November 21, 1990
- Country: Iran
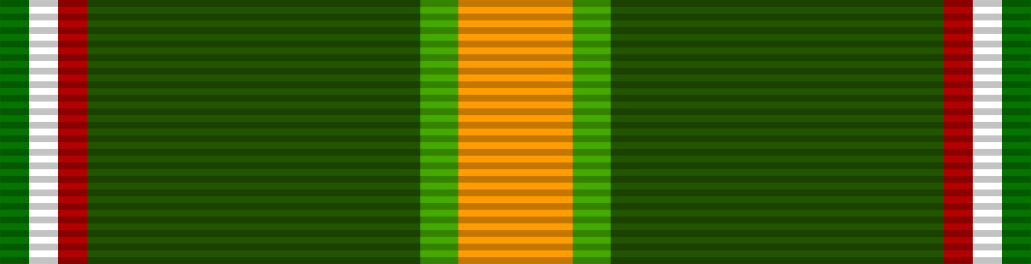
- Ribbon
- Grades: First Order; Second Order; Third Order

Order of Education and Pedagogy (Persian: نشان تعلیم و تربیت) is one of the badges of honor in Iran, established by " The Council of Iran Ministers" on November 21, 1990. According to "Article 16" of the "Regulations on the Awarding of Government Orders" of Iran, the "Order of Education and Pedagogy" due to emphasizes the importance of learning science and the necessity of transferring Islamic education in society, awarded to persons who have demonstrated competence in the following fields:

1. Development and transfer of science, technology, and profession
2. Designing and implementing innovative and successful ways of teaching and nurturing
3. An impressive and successful endeavor to make trainees polite and ethical in Islamic rituals and social desirable ethics

== Recipients ==
| Recipient Name | Badge | Type | Donator | Date |
|---|---|---|---|---|
| Gholam-Ali Haddad-Adel | Order of Education and Pedagogy | Second Order | Akbar Hashemi Rafsanjani | August 9, 1995 |
| Ja'far Alaghemandan | Order of Education and Pedagogy | Third Order | Akbar Hashemi Rafsanjani | August 21, 1996 |
| Ali Shariatmadari | Order of Education and Pedagogy | First Order | Mohammad Khatami | June 17, 1997 |
| Mohsen Chiniforoushan | Order of Education and Pedagogy | Third Order | Mohammad Khatami | August 2, 1997 |
| Mohsin Qara'ati | Order of Education and Pedagogy | Second Order | Mohammad Khatami | June 9, 1999 |
| Fakhroddin Hejazi | Order of Education and Pedagogy | Second Order | Mohammad Khatami | August 4, 2003 |
| Hamid-Reza Haji Babaee | Order of Education and Pedagogy | First Order | Mahmoud Ahmadinejad | June 12, 2013 |

== Types ==
The "Order of Education and Pedagogy" has three types of medal:

First Order Medal

Second Order Medal

Third Order Medal

== See also ==
- Order of Freedom (Iran)
- Order of Altruism
- Order of Work and Production
- Order of Research
- Order of Mehr
- Order of Justice (Iran)
- Order of Construction
- Order of Knowledge
- Order of Persian Politeness
- Order of Independence (Iran)
- Order of Service
- Order of Courage (Iran)
- Order of Culture and Art
- Order of Merit and Management
- Order of Fath
- Order of Islamic Republic
- Order of Nasr
