= Order of Knowledge =

Iranian award of honor

- Iran National Order

Awarded by President of Iran
- Type: Expertise Award, Badge of honor
- Established: By Council of Iran Ministers in November 21, 1990 (in Islamic Republic)
- Country: Iran
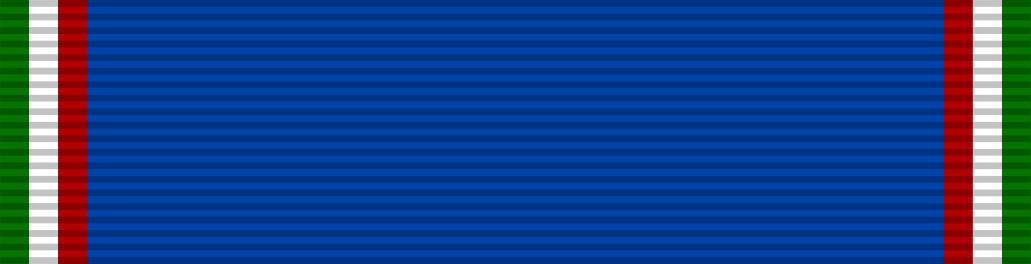
- Ribbon
- Grades: First Order; Second Order; Third Order

Order of Knowledge (Persian: نشان دانش) is one of the badges of honor in Iran. Its establishment dates back to the Qajar dynasty era under the name of "Order of Science"; later in the Pahlavi dynasty the name was changed to "Order of Knowledge". Finally, it was reestablished in Islamic Republic era by "Council of Iran Ministers" on November 21, 1990.

== Qajar dynasty version ==
The Qajar dynasty ruling over Iran from 1789 to 1925. The founding history of this order dates back to Qajar era. The order was known at that time by the name of "Order of Science".

== Pahlavi dynasty version ==
The Pahlavi dynasty was the reigning constitutional monarchy ruling over Iran from 1925 to 1979. In Pahlavi era the "Order of Science" was renamed to "Order of Knowledge" which to this day remains the same name.

That "Order of Knowledge" medal was made of silver and had an eight-pointed stellar design. At the center of it was a Pahlavi Crown of gold in a blue enamel background. It was located around the central part of those olive theme branches. It had a diameter of 53 mm and a ribbon with two red stripes and one white stripe alternately.

== Islamic Republic version ==
According to "Article 7" of the "Regulations on the Awarding of Government Orders" of Iran approved on November 21, 1990, the "Order of Knowledge" is awarded to individuals who have made significant and unprecedented efforts to improve the country's scientific performance in the following ways:

1. Presenting valuable scientific works and essays
2. Sincere effort and service to promote the scientific level of scholars by teaching at universities in the country

== Recipients ==
Recipient Name	Badge	Type	Donator	Date
Jafar Shahidi	Order of Knowledge	First Order	Akbar Hashemi Rafsanjani	May 9, 1995
Abolghasem Gorji	Order of Knowledge	First Order	Akbar Hashemi Rafsanjani	October 15, 1996
Mahmoud Bolourchian	Order of Knowledge	Second Order	Mohammad Khatami	June 17, 1997
Mohammad-Taqi Ja'fari	Order of Knowledge	First Order	Mohammad Khatami	October 5, 1997
Ja'far Sobhani	Order of Knowledge	First Order	Mohammad Khatami	September 30, 1999
Jalaleddin Ashtiani	Order of Knowledge	First Order	Mohammad Khatami	September 30, 1999
Mehdi Mohaghegh	Order of Knowledge	Second Order	Mohammad Khatami	January 30, 2001
Mohammad Reza Hakimi	Order of Knowledge	First Order	Mohammad Khatami	August 4, 2003
Ali Shariatmadari	Order of Knowledge	First Order	Mohammad Khatami	March 13, 2004
Abbasgholi Daneshvar	Order of Knowledge	First Order	Mohammad Khatami	March 13, 2004
Hossein Safayi	Order of Knowledge	Second Order	Mohammad Khatami	August 3, 2004
Mohammad Hashemi	Order of Knowledge	Second Order	Mohammad Khatami	August 3, 2004
Jamshid Momtaz	Order of Knowledge	Second Order	Mohammad Khatami	August 3, 2004
Amirnaser Katouzian	Order of Knowledge	First Order	Mohammad Khatami	August 3, 2004
Naser Simforoush	Order of Knowledge	Second Order	Mohammad Khatami	August 3, 2004
Afsaneh Safavi	Order of Knowledge	Third Order	Mohammad Khatami	August 3, 2004
Reza Baradaran	Order of Knowledge	Second Order	Mohammad Khatami	August 3, 2004
Hossein Zomorshidi	Order of Knowledge	Third Order	Mohammad Khatami	August 3, 2004
Mohammad Ashouri	Order of Knowledge	Second Order	Mohammad Khatami	June 7, 2005
Ezzatollah Araqi	Order of Knowledge	Second Order	Mohammad Khatami	June 7, 2005
Akbar Komijani	Order of Knowledge	Third Order	Mohammad Khatami	June 7, 2005
Hassan Habibi	Order of Knowledge	First Order	Mohammad Khatami	June 7, 2005
Iradj Fazel	Order of Knowledge	First Order	Mohammad Khatami	June 7, 2005
Reza Davari Ardakani	Order of Knowledge	First Order	Mohammad Khatami	June 7, 2005
Kazem Motamednejad	Order of Knowledge	First Order	Mohammad Khatami	June 7, 2005
Mohammad Ebrahim Bastani Parizi	Order of Knowledge	First Order	Mohammad Khatami	June 7, 2005
Ali Mohammad Hanjani	Order of Knowledge	Second Order	Mohammad Khatami	June 7, 2005
Hossein Mehrpoor	Order of Knowledge	Second Order	Mohammad Khatami	June 12, 2005
Ali Akbar Velayati	Order of Knowledge	First Order	Mahmoud Ahmadinejad	March 2, 2010
Mehdi Golshani	Order of Knowledge	First Order	Mahmoud Ahmadinejad	March 2, 2010
Mohammad Hassan Ganji	Order of Knowledge	First Order	Mahmoud Ahmadinejad	October 26, 2011
Parviz Davami	Order of Knowledge	First Order	Mahmoud Ahmadinejad	December 24, 2011
Abbas Sharifi Tehrani	Order of Knowledge	First Order	Mahmoud Ahmadinejad	December 24, 2011
Bahman Yazdi Samadi	Order of Knowledge	First Order	Mahmoud Ahmadinejad	December 24, 2011
Mehdi Rajabalipoor	Order of Knowledge	First Order	Mahmoud Ahmadinejad	December 24, 2011
Abbas Shafiee	Order of Knowledge	First Order	Mahmoud Ahmadinejad	December 24, 2011
Fereydoon Azizi	Order of Knowledge	First Order	Mahmoud Ahmadinejad	December 24, 2011
Karim Vessal	Order of Knowledge	First Order	Mahmoud Ahmadinejad	December 24, 2011
Esmail Yazdi	Order of Knowledge	First Order	Mahmoud Ahmadinejad	December 24, 2011

== Types ==
The "Order of Knowledge" has three types of medal:

First Order Medal

Second Order Medal

Third Order Medal

== See also ==
- Order of Freedom (Iran)
- Order of Altruism
- Order of Work and Production
- Order of Research
- Order of Mehr
- Order of Justice (Iran)
- Order of Construction
- Order of Education and Pedagogy
- Order of Persian Politeness
- Order of Independence (Iran)
- Order of Service
- Order of Courage (Iran)
- Order of Culture and Art
- Order of Merit and Management
- Order of Fath
- Order of Islamic Republic
- Order of Nasr
