= Order of Construction =

Iranian award of honor

- Iran National Order

Awarded by President of Iran
- Type: General Award, Badge of honor
- Established: By Council of Iran Ministers in November 21, 1990
- Country: Iran
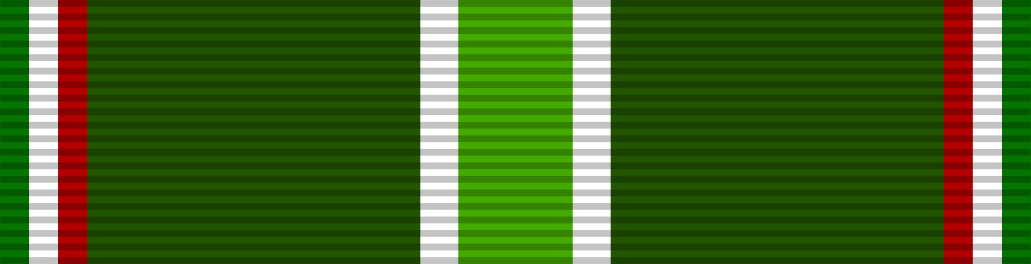
- Ribbon
- Grades: First Order; Second Order; Third Order

Order of Construction (Persian: نشان سازندگی) is one of the badges of honor in Iran, established by "The Council of Iran Ministers" on November 21, 1990. According to "Article 11" of the "Regulations on the Awarding of Government Orders" of Iran, the "Order of Construction" due to praising the efforts being made to reconstruction the country, is awarded to people who have made significant efforts in one of the following ways:

1. Development of civil and building of the country, especially in deprived areas
2. Reconstruction of war and disaster-affected areas
3. Presenting designs and successful civil development plans
4. Increasing the quantity and quality of products that are essential to the country's economic prosperity

== Recipients ==
Recipient	Badge	Type	Donor	Date
Ali Asghar Jalalzadeh	Order of Construction	Third Order	Akbar Hashemi Rafsanjani	March 6, 1995
Behzad Mohaghegh Hazrati	Order of Construction	Third Order	Akbar Hashemi Rafsanjani	March 6, 1995
Mohammad Saeedikia	Order of Construction	First Order	Akbar Hashemi Rafsanjani	April 9, 1995
Mohammad Jafar Bahrami	Order of Construction	Third Order	Akbar Hashemi Rafsanjani	June 24, 1996
Hamdollah Mohammadnejad	Order of Construction	Third Order	Akbar Hashemi Rafsanjani	June 24, 1996
Abolghasem Ashouri	Order of Construction	Third Order	Akbar Hashemi Rafsanjani	June 25, 1996
Mohammad Malaaki	Order of Construction	Third Order	Akbar Hashemi Rafsanjani	August 14, 1996
Ata Ahmadi	Order of Construction	Third Order	Akbar Hashemi Rafsanjani	August 14, 1996
Mahmoud Shiri	Order of Construction	Third Order	Akbar Hashemi Rafsanjani	August 14, 1996
Karim Farajzadeh Halvayi	Order of Construction	Third Order	Akbar Hashemi Rafsanjani	October 15, 1996
Mahmoud Ghaeli	Order of Construction	Third Order	Akbar Hashemi Rafsanjani	October 16, 1996
Mohammad-Hossein Moghimi	Order of Construction	Third Order	Akbar Hashemi Rafsanjani	December 11, 1996
Bohloul Amiri	Order of Construction	Third Order	Akbar Hashemi Rafsanjani	December 11, 1996
Mohammad Taghi Soleimani	Order of Construction	Third Order	Akbar Hashemi Rafsanjani	December 11, 1996
Mohammad Kiafar	Order of Construction	Third Order	Akbar Hashemi Rafsanjani	January 21, 1997
Gholam Hossein Abdollahi	Order of Construction	Third Order	Akbar Hashemi Rafsanjani	January 28, 1997
Gholam Hossein Nejaabat	Order of Construction	Third Order	Akbar Hashemi Rafsanjani	January 28, 1997
Ali Vakili	Order of Construction	Second Order	Akbar Hashemi Rafsanjani	February 16, 1997
Jalil Besharati	Order of Construction	Second Order	Akbar Hashemi Rafsanjani	March 9, 1997
Habib Aminfar	Order of Construction	Third Order	Akbar Hashemi Rafsanjani	June 17, 1997
Abolhassan Khamoushi	Order of Construction	Third Order	Akbar Hashemi Rafsanjani	June 17, 1997
Mohammad Hossein Habibian	Order of Construction	Third Order	Akbar Hashemi Rafsanjani	June 17, 1997
Gholamreza Manouchehri Ardestani	Order of Construction	Third Order	Akbar Hashemi Rafsanjani	August 2, 1997
Masoud Faanian	Order of Construction	Third Order	Mohammad Khatami	June 9, 1999
Abolghasem Mozaffari	Order of Construction	Third Order	Mohammad Khatami	January 30, 2001
Ali Akbar Zahmatkesh	Order of Construction	Third Order	Mohammad Khatami	January 9, 2003
Vafa Tabesh	Order of Construction	Third Order	Mohammad Khatami	January 9, 2003
Mostafa Sabaq Torkan	Order of Construction	Third Order	Mohammad Khatami	August 3, 2004
Mohammad Ali Habib Agahi	Order of Construction	Third Order	Mohammad Khatami	August 3, 2004
Farhad Izadjoo	Order of Construction	Third Order	Mohammad Khatami	August 3, 2004
Mohammad-Hossein Moghimi	Order of Construction	Second Order	Mohammad Khatami	June 7, 2005
Mohammad-Ali Afshani	Order of Construction	Second Order	Mohammad Khatami	June 7, 2005
Ali Nikzad	Order of Construction	First Order	Mahmoud Ahmadinejad	June 12, 2013
Ali Akbar Mehrabian	Order of Construction	Second Order	Mahmoud Ahmadinejad	June 12, 2013
Karam Reza Piriyayi	Order of Construction	Third Order	Mahmoud Ahmadinejad	August 3, 2013

== Types ==
The "Order of Construction" has three types of medal:

First Order Medal

Second Order Medal

Third Order Medal

== See also ==
- Order of Freedom (Iran)
- Order of Altruism
- Order of Work and Production
- Order of Research
- Order of Mehr
- Order of Justice (Iran)
- Order of Knowledge
- Order of Education and Pedagogy
- Order of Persian Politeness
- Order of Independence (Iran)
- Order of Service
- Order of Courage (Iran)
- Order of Culture and Art
- Order of Merit and Management
- Order of Fath
- Order of Islamic Republic
- Order of Nasr
