= Order of Sepah =

- First, Second, and Third Classes of the Order of Sepah

Awarded by Shah of Iran
- Type: Order
- Royal house: Pahlavi dynasty
- Status: Obsolete
- Shah: Mohammad Reza Pahlavi
- Grades: Three classes
- First Class Second Class Third Class Ribbon bars

Medal of Sepah
- First, Second, and Third Classes of the Medal of Sepah

Awarded by Shah of Iran
- Type: Medal
- Royal house: Pahlavi dynasty
- Status: Obsolete
- Shah: Mohammad Reza Pahlavi
- Grades: Three classes

The Order of Sepah (Persian: نشان سپه, romanized: Neshan-e Sepah) was one of the orders of honor of Iran. It was established during the final years of the Qajar dynasty by Reza Khan, while he still held the title of Sardar Sepah (Commander of the Army), and partially replaced the Order of Zolfaghar.

== History ==
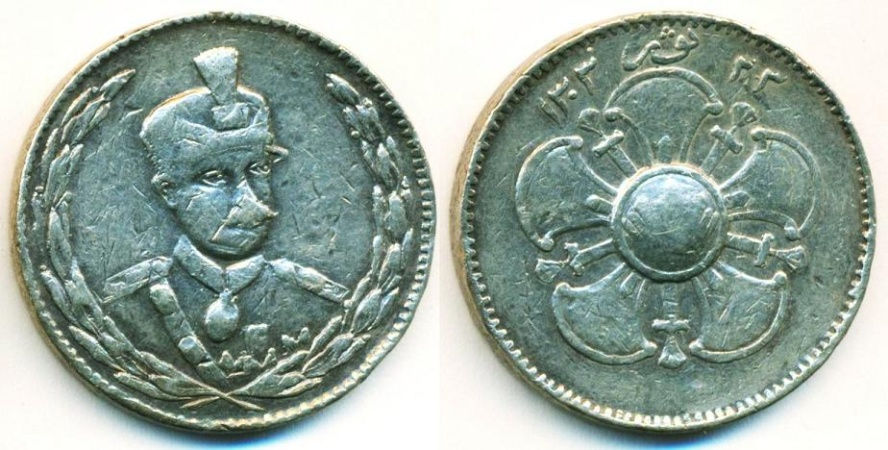
The original Medal of Sepah (Sardar Sepah) upon its establishment.

The Order of Sepah was first instituted on 19 April 1924 by Reza Khan Sardar Sepah. It was awarded to those who demonstrated exceptional military bravery or who were wounded in the line of duty. In effect, it replaced the Order of Zolfaghar. Reza Shah reserved the Order of Zolfaghar for himself and a small number of senior military commanders throughout his reign, while other recipients were awarded the Order of Sepah.

== Design ==
When first introduced, the decoration was circular. The obverse bore a portrait of Sardar Sepah (Reza Khan) in military uniform, surrounded by olive branches. The reverse depicted a five-pointed shield crossed by five swords. At the center was a raised circular medallion bearing a rising sun. The date of institution, 23 Sawr 1303 AHSh (13 May 1924), was inscribed at the top. The medal weighed 16.31 grams and measured 31 mm in diameter. Because the date was written using the month name Sawr (Thawr), the decoration is sometimes mistakenly referred to by Iranian collectors as the "Reza Khan Thawr Medal."

The order consisted of three classes and was intended for those who displayed bravery during internal military operations. During the reign of Mohammad Reza Pahlavi, the name of the order was retained, but its design was completely revised. The original circular, double-sided medal was replaced with a five-rayed order. The new design was inspired by the reverse of the original medal and featured red and blue enamel. The five rays were enameled in red, while the central medallion was enameled blue. The rising sun at the center was rendered in gold.

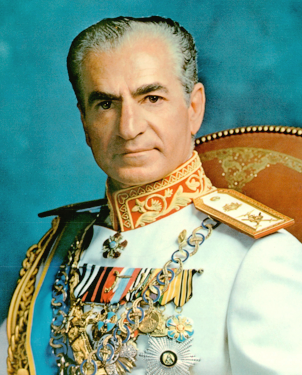
The Order of Sepah worn around the neck of Mohammad Reza Pahlavi.

The order was abolished following the Iranian Revolution of 1979.

== Gallery ==
=== Classes of the Order ===
First Class of the Order of Sepah

Second Class of the Order of Sepah

Third Class of the Order of Sepah

=== Classes of the Medal ===
First Class Medal of Sepah

Second Class Medal of Sepah

Third Class Medal of Sepah
