= Dariush Navidgouyi =

- Born: Shiraz, Iran
- Occupations: Writer and publisher
- Years active: 1969–present
- Awards: Order of Culture and Art · 19-time National Top Publisher · 27-time Top Publisher of Fars Province

Dariush Navidgouyi (In Persian language: داریوش نویدگویی) is a publisher and author from Shiraz, Iran. He is the recipient of the First-Class Order of Culture and Art and has been selected 19 times as the National Top Publisher and 27 times as the Top Publisher of Fars Province.

== Career ==
He has been a member of the board of directors of various charitable and cultural foundations in Fars province and nationally. He is also the head of the Association of Philanthropists for the Development of Libraries and Promotion of Reading in Fars Province.

== Cultural Contributions ==
Navidgouyi has donated tens of thousands of valuable books, manuscripts, and historical documents to academic, cultural, and educational institutions. He has organized national and international ceremonies honoring prominent cultural figures from Shiraz and Fars and has received over 1,000 plaques of appreciation from top officials in the past forty years. He established a cultural house and book museum near the Esfahan Gate (Shiraz), adjacent to the historic Iran and India Company building, which serves as a meeting place for intellectuals and culture lovers. In 2000, he donated 104 rare manuscript and lithographed books to Shiraz University's Central Library and Archives. He also donated 163 historical documents to the National Library of Southern Iran.

Navidgouyi, during a visit with the Shiraz Islamic Council and other officials, donated 600 books from Navid Shiraz Publications to the people of Kurdistan. He has also organized poetry contests and gatherings to promote Persian language and literature.

He has donated over 530 rare books to Mirza-ye Shirazi Library and an extensive collection of documents dating back 200 years to establish a document museum in Shiraz.

== Publications ==
Since 1970, he has directed Navid Shiraz Publications, publishing distinguished works with the collaboration of calligraphers and scholars. His publications rank among the top six publishers in Iran after the 1979 Revolution.

== Recognition ==
On October 24, 2024, a ceremony was held in Shiraz honoring Navidgouyi for fifty years of cultural work. He has published over 4,300 book titles and received 900 appreciation plaques. In the 2001 Shiraz flood, he lost around 700,000 books.

Poet and researcher Dr. Mohammad Amin Jafari said during the event: “Calling Master Navidgouyi a faculty of humanities would not be an exaggeration.”

== Criticism of the Publishing Sector ==
Navidgouyi has repeatedly criticized the state of publishing in Iran, from poor distribution to delays in publication approvals by the Ministry of Culture and Islamic Guidance.

== Open Library ==
He established the first open library in Shiraz, across from the Department of Culture and Islamic Guidance near the Tomb of Hafez, without librarians or guards, encouraging public access.

== Anthropology Museum and Book Exhibition ==
He established an anthropology museum and a permanent exhibition of Navid Shiraz publications, highlighting the culture of Shiraz and Fars as a center of tourism.
