= Order of Independence =

Order of Independence may refer to:

- Order of Independence (Jordan), knighthood order of the Kingdom of Jordan
- Order of Independence (Iran), Iranian state order
- Order of Independence (Vietnam), Vietnamese decoration

== See also ==
- Order of Independence and Freedom
