= Mir Ebrahim Seyyed Hatami =

Iranian Ayatollah (1924-2019)

- میر ابراهیم سیدحاتمی
- The late Ayatollah Mir Ebrahim Seyyed Hatami

Member of Assembly of Experts
- In office 2001–2016
- Constituency: Ardabil Province

Personal details
- Born: 1924 Ardabil, Iran
- Died: January 6, 2019 (aged 94–95) Qom, Iran
- Education: Qom Hawza
- Awards: Order of Service (1st class)

Mir-Ebrahim Seyyed Hatami (Persian: میرابراهیم سیدحاتمی;) born in Ardabil, (1924 – 6 January 2019) was one of the high rank Ayatullahs of Ardabil province, and a member of the Assembly of Experts. He was a member of 3rd and 4th Assembly of Experts of Iran. Hatami died on January 6, 2019, and was buried the following day.

== See also ==
- List of ayatollahs
