= Order of Culture and Art =

Iranian award of honor

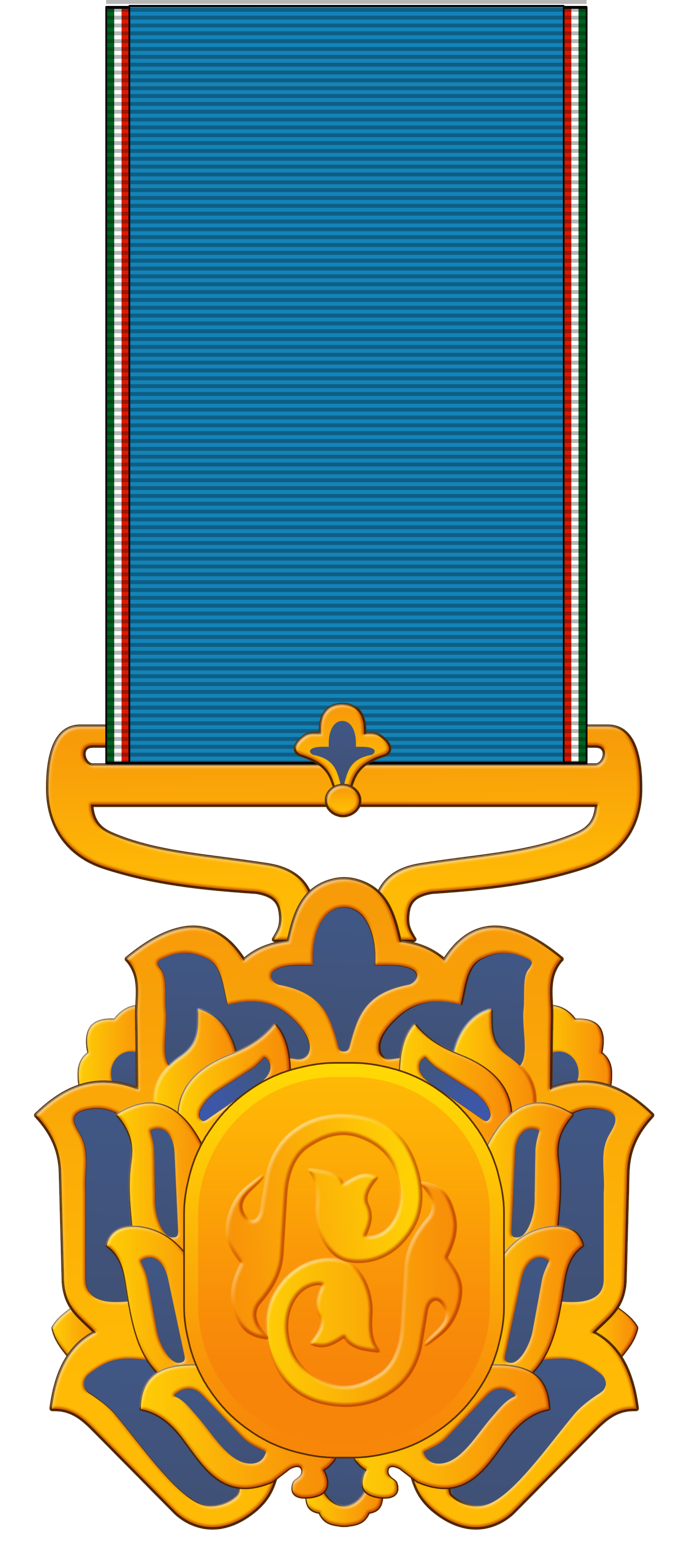
- First Order Medal of Culture and Art
- Type: National order
- Established: By Council of Iran Ministers on 21 November 1990 and modified on 27 June 2007
- Country: Islamic Republic of Iran
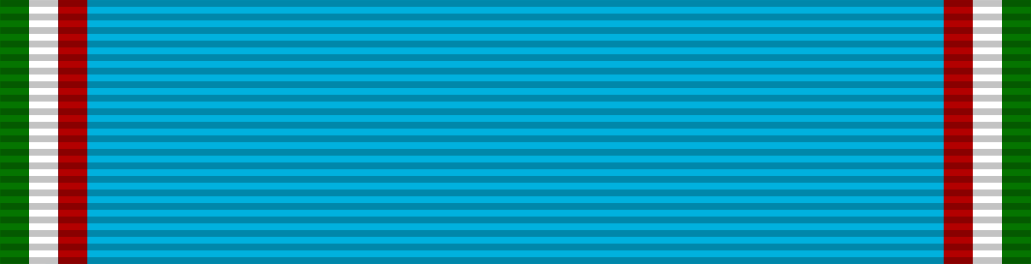
- Ribbon
- Awarded by: President of Iran
- Grades: First Order; Second Order; Third Order

Order of Culture and Art (Persian: نشان فرهنگ و هنر) is an Iranian state general order established by "Council of Iran Ministers" on 21 November 1990 and modified on 27 June 2007. The order has three classes and awarded by President of Iran. According to Article 17 of the Regulations on the Awarding of Government Orders of Iran, the Order of Culture and Art is awarded to those who "facilitate theirs thinking, passions and emotions to express deep Islamic and humanitarian concepts and to spread culture" in one of the following ways:

1. Disseminating rich Islamic culture and eliminating society from foreign decadent culture
2. Expanding the theoretical and disciplinary foundations of religious education
3. Expanding national culture and revitalizing valuable social traditions
4. Expressing creativity and presenting exquisite works of art or literature
5. Pay particular attention to the country's cultural, artistic or literary heritage, so as to be effective in its restoration, preservation and utilization
6. Introducing, describing, explaining, critiquing and presenting one of the artistic or literary disciplines internationally
7. Inventing a new style in one of the artistic or literary disciplines
8. Promote a culture of sacrifice and martyrdom in the community
9. Creating remarkable and valuable artworks to convey the ideals and values of the Islamic Revolution and the Sacred Defense to future generations

== Recipients ==
No.	Recipient Name	Badge	Type	Donated by	Date
1.	Hossein Momtaheni	Order of Culture and Art	First Order	Akbar Hashemi Rafsanjani	2 August 1992
2.	Mahmoud Farshchian	Order of Culture and Art	First Order	Akbar Hashemi Rafsanjani	14 June 1995
3.	Ahmad Masjed-Jamei	Order of Culture and Art	Third Order	Akbar Hashemi Rafsanjani	2 August 1997
4.	Gholam Hossein Amirkhani	Order of Culture and Art	First Order	Mohammad Khatami	29 September 1999
5.	Hassan Kassai	Order of Culture and Art	First Order	Mohammad Khatami	29 September 1999
6.	Ali Akbar Sanati	Order of Culture and Art	First Order	Mohammad Khatami	29 September 1999
7.	Haj Ghorban Soleimani	Order of Culture and Art	Second Order	Mohammad Khatami	30 January 2001
8.	Fathollah Mojtabaei	Order of Culture and Art	First Order	Mohammad Khatami	4 August 2003
9.	Tahereh Saffarzadeh	Order of Culture and Art	Second Order	Mohammad Khatami	4 August 2003
10.	Sakineh Emami	Order of Culture and Art	Third Order	Mohammad Khatami	4 August 2003
11.	Ali Akbar Tajvidi	Order of Culture and Art	First Order	Mohammad Khatami	13 March 2004
12.	Hadi Mirmiran	Order of Culture and Art	First Order	Mohammad Khatami	2 January 2005
13.	Morteza Momayez	Order of Culture and Art	First Order	Mohammad Khatami	2 January 2005
14.	Naser Katouzian	Order of Culture and Art	First Order	Mohammad Khatami	2 February 2005
15.	Farhad Fakhreddini	Order of Culture and Art	First Order	Mohammad Khatami	7 June 2005
16.	Mohammad Ehsai	Order of Culture and Art	First Order	Mohammad Khatami	7 June 2005
17.	Ali Nassirian	Order of Culture and Art	First Order	Mohammad Khatami	7 June 2005
18.	Zahra Rahnavard	Order of Culture and Art	Second Order	Mohammad Khatami	7 June 2005
19.	Gholam Hossein Amirkhani	Order of Culture and Art	First Order	Mahmoud Ahmadinejad	29 September 2009
20.	Morteza Sadaat Fatemi	Order of Culture and Art	First Order	Mahmoud Ahmadinejad	13 August 2011
21.	Rahim Khaki	Order of Culture and Art	Second Order	Mahmoud Ahmadinejad	13 August 2011
22.	Shahriar Parhizgar	Order of Culture and Art	Second Order	Mahmoud Ahmadinejad	13 August 2011
23.	Karim Mansouri	Order of Culture and Art	Second Order	Mahmoud Ahmadinejad	13 August 2011
24.	Ahmad Abolghasemi	Order of Culture and Art	Second Order	Mahmoud Ahmadinejad	13 August 2011
25.	Hashem Roghani	Order of Culture and Art	Second Order	Mahmoud Ahmadinejad	13 August 2011
26.	Mohammad Hossein Saeedian	Order of Culture and Art	Second Order	Mahmoud Ahmadinejad	13 August 2011
27.	Abbas Emamjomeh	Order of Culture and Art	Second Order	Mahmoud Ahmadinejad	13 August 2011
28.	Mohammad Abbasi	Order of Culture and Art	Third Order	Mahmoud Ahmadinejad	13 August 2011
29.	Hassan Rezayian	Order of Culture and Art	Third Order	Mahmoud Ahmadinejad	13 August 2011
30.	Mansour Ghasrizadeh	Order of Culture and Art	Third Order	Mahmoud Ahmadinejad	13 August 2011
31.	Mohammad Javad Panahi Toosi	Order of Culture and Art	Third Order	Mahmoud Ahmadinejad	13 August 2011
32.	Mohammad Abolghasemi	Order of Culture and Art	Third Order	Mahmoud Ahmadinejad	13 August 2011
33.	Ali Asghar Sherbaf	Order of Culture and Art	First Order	Mahmoud Ahmadinejad	24 December 2011
34.	Majid Kiani	Order of Culture and Art	First Order	Mahmoud Ahmadinejad	24 December 2011
35.	Jalil Shahnaz	Order of Culture and Art	First Order	Mahmoud Ahmadinejad	24 December 2011
36.	Ebrahim Pourfarzib	Order of Culture and Art	First Order	Mahmoud Ahmadinejad	24 December 2011
37.	Mohammad-Ali Keshavarz	Order of Culture and Art	First Order	Mahmoud Ahmadinejad	19 September 2012
38.	Davoud Rashidi	Order of Culture and Art	First Order	Mahmoud Ahmadinejad	31 January 2013
39.	Ezzatolah Entezami	Order of Culture and Art	First Order	Mahmoud Ahmadinejad	31 January 2013
40.	Jamshid Mashayekhi	Order of Culture and Art	First Order	Mahmoud Ahmadinejad	31 January 2013
41.	Zhaleh Olov	Order of Culture and Art	First Order	Mahmoud Ahmadinejad	31 January 2013
42.	Esfandiar Rahim Mashaei	Order of Culture and Art	First Order	Mahmoud Ahmadinejad	10 March 2013
43.	Akbar Abdi	Order of Culture and Art	First Order	Mahmoud Ahmadinejad	22 June 2013
44.	Dariush Arjmand	Order of Culture and Art	First Order	Mahmoud Ahmadinejad	22 June 2013

== Classes ==
It comes in three classes:

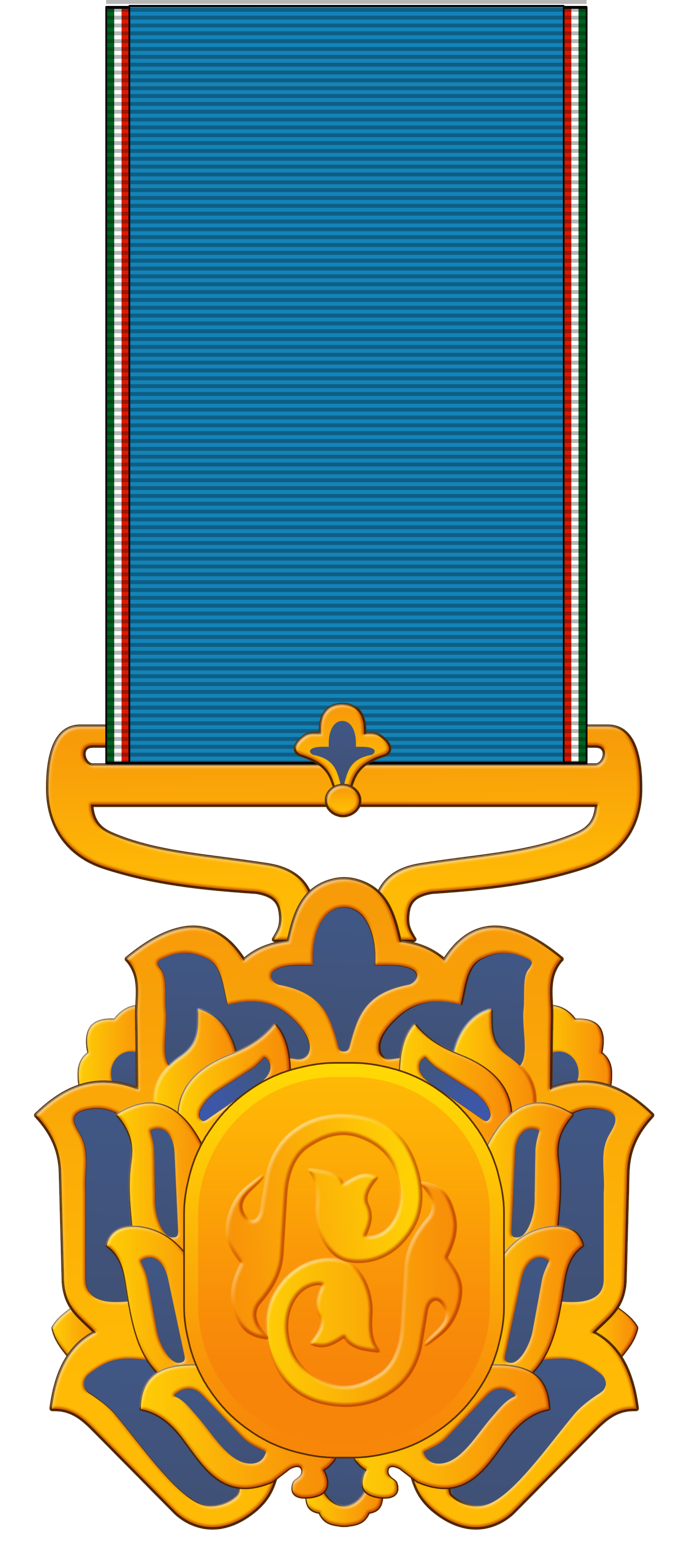
1st Order

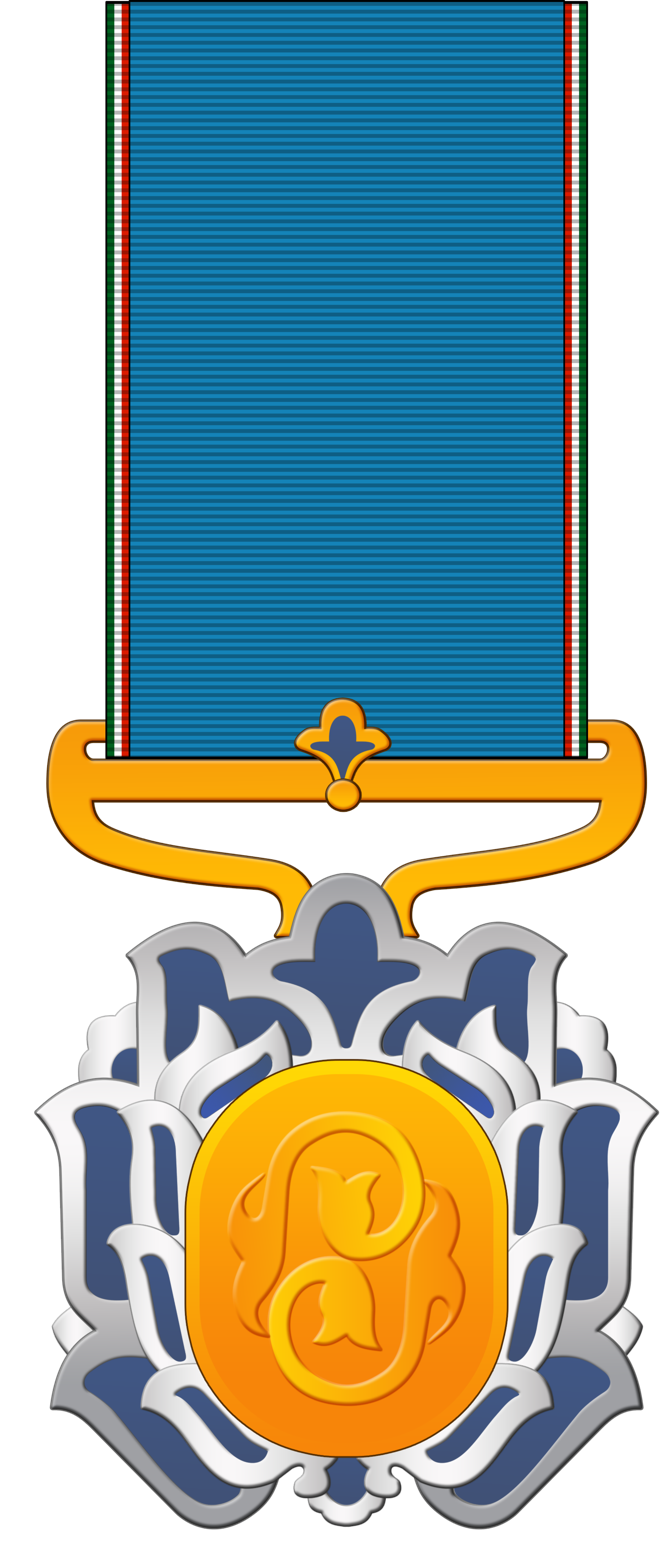
2nd Order

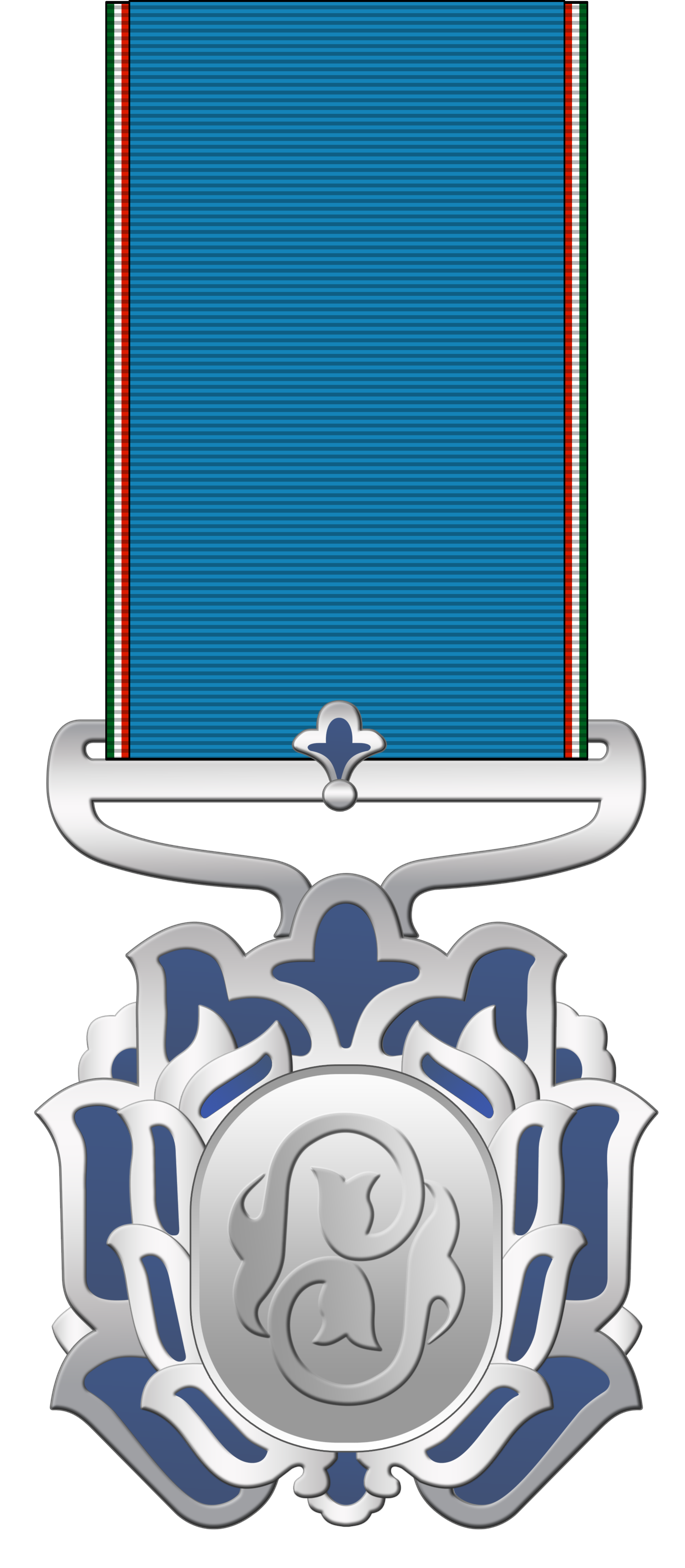
3rd Order

== See also ==
- Order of Merit and Management
- Order of Freedom (Iran)
- Order of Altruism
- Order of Work and Production
- Order of Research
- Order of Mehr
- Order of Justice (Iran)
- Order of Construction
- Order of Knowledge
- Order of Education and Pedagogy
- Order of Persian Politeness
- Order of Independence (Iran)
- Order of Service
- Order of Courage (Iran)
