= National Medals of Appreciation and Memorial =

- Awarded for: Outstanding contributions to the advancement of country
- Country: Iran
- Presented by: President of Iran
- First award: 2010

The National Medals of Appreciation and Memorial is an honor bestowed by the President of Iran to individuals who have made important contributions to the advancement of knowledge in various fields of science or have lost their lives defending the country. The presidential Committee on the National Medals is responsible for selecting award recipients and is administered by the Presidential Office.

== History ==
The National Medals of Appreciation and Memorial were established on November 21, 2010, by an act of the Cabinet of Iran. The National Medal of Appreciation is to honor scientists who have shown significant contributions to the development of the country. The National Medal of Memorial is to honor those who lost their lives defending the country. The National Medals of Appreciation and Memorial are classified as Golden and Silver Medals.

== National Medal of Appreciation ==
- 2010 Meisam Tabatabaei
- 2010 Hamed Sani Khanin
- 2010 Mohammad Rashidian
- 2015 Esmail Baghaei
- 2015 Behzad Saberi
- 2015 Mohammad Amiri
- 2015 Mohammad Hassan Daryayi

The awards ceremony is organized by the Office of President of Iran. It is presided by the sitting President of Iran.
