= Order of Work and Production =

Iranian award of honor

- First Order Medal of Work and Production; Iran National Order

Awarded by President of Iran
- Type: General Award, Badge of honor
- Established: By Council of Iran Ministers in November 21, 1990
- Country: Iran
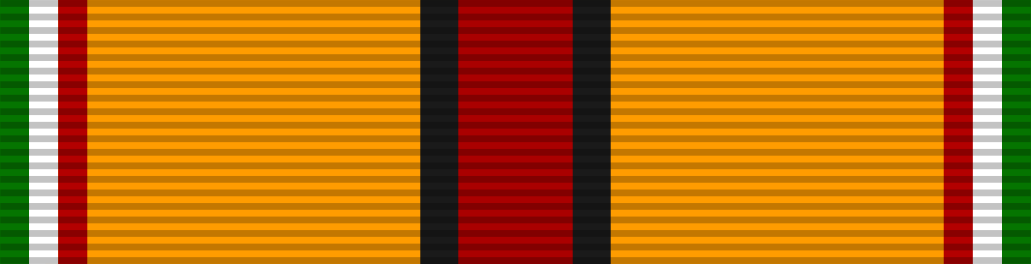
- Ribbon
- Grades: First Order; Second Order; Third Order

The Order of Work and Production (Persian: نشان کار و تولید) is one of the badges of honor in Iran, established by "Council of Iran Ministers" on November 21, 1990. The order has three classes, and is awarded by President of Iran. According to "Article 13" of the "Regulations on the Awarding of Government Orders" of Iran, the "Order of Work and Production" is awarded to persons who have achieved remarkable results in industry or agriculture in one of the following areas:

1. Increasing the production capacity of the country in terms of quantity and quality
2. Proper use of technical facilities and economic resources
3. Designing or implementing important industrial and agricultural projects
4. Innovations and inventions to improve working and production practices and increase productivity
5. Raising the level of technical and professional knowledge
6. Creating the best Islamic and human relations in the workplace

== Recipients ==
No.	Recipient Name	Badge	Type	Donator	Date
1.	Ahmad Rahgozar	Order of Work and Production	Third Order	Akbar Hashemi Rafsanjani	January 15, 1995
2.	Rasoul Lahijanian	Order of Work and Production	Third Order	Akbar Hashemi Rafsanjani	January 15, 1995
3.	Ahmad Rahgozar	Order of Work and Production	Second Order	Akbar Hashemi Rafsanjani	April 22, 1995
4.	Gholamali Kiani	Order of Work and Production	Second Order	Akbar Hashemi Rafsanjani	January 21, 1997
5.	Mohammad Jafar Malakouti	Order of Work and Production	Third Order	Akbar Hashemi Rafsanjani	January 21, 1997
6.	Ahmad Bagher Yazdli	Order of Work and Production	Third Order	Akbar Hashemi Rafsanjani	January 21, 1997
7.	Abbas Taghipour	Order of Work and Production	Third Order	Akbar Hashemi Rafsanjani	January 21, 1997
8.	Mohammad Shahabi	Order of Work and Production	Third Order	Akbar Hashemi Rafsanjani	June 17, 1997
9.	Nezamoddin Sajjadi	Order of Work and Production	Third Order	Akbar Hashemi Rafsanjani	August 2, 1997
10.	Mostafa Mohammad-Najjar	Order of Work and Production	Third Order	Akbar Hashemi Rafsanjani	August 2, 1997
11.	Manouchehr Gharavi	Order of Work and Production	Third Order	Mohammad Khatami	June 9, 1999
12.	Seyfollah Ebrahimi	Order of Work and Production	Third Order	Mohammad Khatami	June 9, 1999
13.	Mohammad Alipour Fetrati	Order of Work and Production	Third Order	Mohammad Khatami	June 9, 1999
14.	Mostafa Alinasab	Order of Work and Production	First Order	Mohammad Khatami	January 30, 2001
15.	Reza Viseh	Order of Work and Production	Third Order	Mohammad Khatami	January 30, 2001
16.	Mohammad Aghayi Tabrizi	Order of Work and Production	Third Order	Mohammad Khatami	January 30, 2001
17.	Jalil Khebreh	Order of Work and Production	Second Order	Mohammad Khatami	August 4, 2003
18.	Davoud Abedi Amoli	Order of Work and Production	Third Order	Mohammad Khatami	August 4, 2003
19.	Mahmoud Eslamian	Order of Work and Production	Third Order	Mohammad Khatami	August 3, 2004
20.	Mohammad Hossein Shariatmadar	Order of Work and Production	Second Order	Mohammad Khatami	June 7, 2005
21.	Abdozzahra Vatandoost	Order of Work and Production	Third Order	Mohammad Khatami	June 7, 2005
22.	Mohsen Khalili Araqi	Order of Work and Production	Second Order	Mahmoud Ahmadinejad	July 7, 2013

== Types ==
The "Order of Work and Production" has three types of medal:

First Order Medal

Second Order Medal

Third Order Medal

== See also ==
- Order of Freedom (Iran)
- Order of Altruism
- Order of Research
- Order of Mehr
- Order of Justice (Iran)
- Order of Construction
- Order of Knowledge
- Order of Education and Pedagogy
- Order of Persian Politeness
- Order of Independence (Iran)
- Order of Service
- Order of Courage (Iran)
- Order of Culture and Art
- Order of Merit and Management
