= Order of Merit and Management =

Iranian award of honor

- First class of the Order
- Type: National order
- Established: By Council of Ministers of Iran on November 21, 1990
- Country: Islamic Republic of Iran
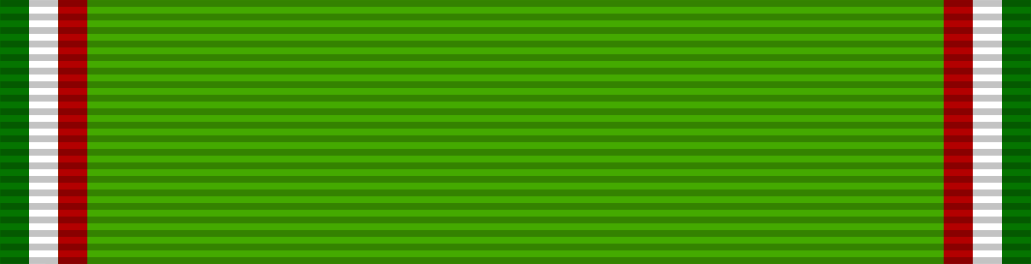
- Ribbon
- Awarded by: President of Iran
- Grades: First Order; Second Order; Third Order

Order of Merit and Management (Persian: نشان لياقت و مديريت) is an Iranian state expertise order established by "Council of Ministers of Iran" in November 21, 1990. The order has three classes, and awarded by President of Iran. According to Article 9 of the Regulations on the Awarding of Government Orders of Iran, the Order of Merit and Management is awarded to people who achieve "an exceptional success in management, distinguished activities, aiding the oppressed and deprived people and/or beneficiary use of utilities and/or offering exquisite ways".

== Recipients ==
| No. | Recipient Name | Badge | Type | Donator | Date |
|---|---|---|---|---|---|
| 1. | Mohammad Ali Abadizadeh | Order of Merit and Management | Third Order | Akbar Hashemi Rafsanjani | March 25, 1995 |
| 2. | Abdollah Jassbi | Order of Merit and Management | Second Order | Akbar Hashemi Rafsanjani | May 9, 1995 |
| 3. | Jamal Pouramrollahi | Order of Merit and Management | Third Order | Akbar Hashemi Rafsanjani | August 3, 1995 |
| 4. | Mohammad Ebrahim Taherian Fard | Order of Merit and Management | Third Order | Akbar Hashemi Rafsanjani | August 3, 1995 |
| 5. | Hassan Shafti | Order of Merit and Management | Third Order | Akbar Hashemi Rafsanjani | June 19, 1996 |
| 6. | Hossein Shahaboddin | Order of Merit and Management | Third Order | Akbar Hashemi Rafsanjani | October 6, 1996 |
| 7. | Mehdi Karbasian | Order of Merit and Management | Second Order | Akbar Hashemi Rafsanjani | January 16, 1997 |
| 8. | Ali Kolahdooz Esfahani | Order of Merit and Management | Third Order | Akbar Hashemi Rafsanjani | January 16, 1997 |
| 9. | Mohammad Taghi Amanpour | Order of Merit and Management | Second Order | Akbar Hashemi Rafsanjani | January 22, 1997 |
| 10. | Ahmad Sadeghi | Order of Merit and Management | Second Order | Akbar Hashemi Rafsanjani | January 22, 1997 |
| 11. | Mohsen Safayi Farhani | Order of Merit and Management | Third Order | Akbar Hashemi Rafsanjani | January 22, 1997 |
| 12. | Mohammad Hossein Habibian | Order of Merit and Management | Third Order | Akbar Hashemi Rafsanjani | June 11, 1997 |
| 13. | Ali Shekarriz | Order of Merit and Management | Third Order | Akbar Hashemi Rafsanjani | June 11, 1997 |
| 14. | Mehdi Tafazzoli | Order of Merit and Management | Third Order | Akbar Hashemi Rafsanjani | June 11, 1997 |
| 15. | Mohammad Hassan Erfanian | Order of Merit and Management | Third Order | Akbar Hashemi Rafsanjani | June 16, 1997 |
| 16. | Ahmad Ali Karbalayi Havati | Order of Merit and Management | Third Order | Akbar Hashemi Rafsanjani | June 17, 1997 |
| 17. | Behrouz Boushehri | Order of Merit and Management | Third Order | Akbar Hashemi Rafsanjani | August 2, 1997 |
| 18. | Masoud Fanian | Order of Merit and Management | Third Order | Mohammad Khatami | June 2, 1999 |
| 19. | Amin Haj Rasouliha | Order of Merit and Management | Third Order | Mohammad Khatami | January 10, 2001 |
| 20. | Mousa Refan | Order of Merit and Management | Third Order | Mohammad Khatami | January 10, 2001 |
| 21. | Mohammad Hadi Khazayi | Order of Merit and Management | Third Order | Mohammad Khatami | January 10, 2001 |
| 22. | Mojtaba Khosrotaj | Order of Merit and Management | Third Order | Mohammad Khatami | July 30, 2003 |
| 23. | Mahmoud Jannatian | Order of Merit and Management | Third Order | Mohammad Khatami | July 30, 2003 |
| 24. | Ali Mohammad Noorian | Order of Merit and Management | Third Order | Mohammad Khatami | July 30, 2003 |
| 25. | Sattar Mahmoudi | Order of Merit and Management | Third Order | Mohammad Khatami | July 30, 2003 |
| 26. | Ziaoddin Shojaee Borhan | Order of Merit and Management | Third Order | Mohammad Khatami | February 18, 2004 |
| 27. | Jalal Rasoul Ef | Order of Merit and Management | Third Order | Mohammad Khatami | February 18, 2004 |
| 28. | Masoud Karbasian | Order of Merit and Management | Third Order | Mohammad Khatami | February 18, 2004 |
| 29. | Mohsen Khajeh Noori | Order of Merit and Management | Third Order | Mohammad Khatami | August 3, 2004 |
| 30. | Abdolhossein Sabet | Order of Merit and Management | Third Order | Mohammad Khatami | August 3, 2004 |
| 31. | Seyfollah Aliasghari | Order of Merit and Management | Third Order | Mohammad Khatami | August 3, 2004 |
| 32. | Mohammad Reza Yazdani Khorram | Order of Merit and Management | Third Order | Mohammad Khatami | August 3, 2004 |
| 33. | Mahmoud Amiri | Order of Merit and Management | Third Order | Mohammad Khatami | August 3, 2004 |
| 34. | Nazal Sarrafzadegan | Order of Merit and Management | Third Order | Mohammad Khatami | August 3, 2004 |
| 35. | Fatemeh Karroubi | Order of Merit and Management | Third Order | Mohammad Khatami | August 3, 2004 |
| 36. | Ali Younesi | Order of Merit and Management | First Order | Mohammad Khatami | January 31, 2005 |
| 37. | Mohammad Reza Nematzadeh | Order of Merit and Management | First Order | Mohammad Khatami | June 7, 2005 |
| 38. | Mohammad Bagherian | Order of Merit and Management | First Order | Mohammad Khatami | June 7, 2005 |
| 39. | Mohammad Sattarifar | Order of Merit and Management | First Order | Mohammad Khatami | June 7, 2005 |
| 40. | Nasrollah Jahangard | Order of Merit and Management | Second Order | Mohammad Khatami | June 7, 2005 |
| 41. | Mostafa Moazzenzadeh | Order of Merit and Management | Second Order | Mohammad Khatami | June 7, 2005 |
| 42. | Seyyed Mehdi Hosseini | Order of Merit and Management | Third Order | Mohammad Khatami | June 7, 2005 |
| 43. | Mahmoud Asgari Azad | Order of Merit and Management | Third Order | Mohammad Khatami | June 7, 2005 |
| 44. | Mahmoud Mohaddes | Order of Merit and Management | Third Order | Mohammad Khatami | June 7, 2005 |
| 45. | Ali Ashraf Afkhami | Order of Merit and Management | Third Order | Mohammad Khatami | June 7, 2005 |
| 46. | Majid Ghadami | Order of Merit and Management | Third Order | Mohammad Khatami | June 7, 2005 |
| 47. | Karim Momeni | Order of Merit and Management | Third Order | Mohammad Khatami | June 7, 2005 |
| 48. | Yousef Hojjat | Order of Merit and Management | Third Order | Mohammad Khatami | June 7, 2005 |
| 49. | Mohsen Pourseyyed Aghayi | Order of Merit and Management | Third Order | Mohammad Khatami | July 8, 2005 |
| 50. | Mohammad Dadkan | Order of Merit and Management | First Order | Mohammad Khatami | July 31, 2005 |
| 51. | Jafar Mohammadi | Order of Merit and Management | Second Order | Mahmoud Ahmadinejad | August 27, 2006 |
| 52. | Jaber Safdari | Order of Merit and Management | Second Order | Mahmoud Ahmadinejad | August 27, 2006 |
| 53. | Sowlat Sana | Order of Merit and Management | Second Order | Mahmoud Ahmadinejad | August 27, 2006 |
| 54. | Ali Hajinia Laylabadi | Order of Merit and Management | Third Order | Mahmoud Ahmadinejad | August 27, 2006 |
| 55. | Houshang Nobari | Order of Merit and Management | Third Order | Mahmoud Ahmadinejad | August 27, 2006 |
| 56. | Amir Moayed Alayi | Order of Merit and Management | Third Order | Mahmoud Ahmadinejad | August 27, 2006 |
| 57. | Morteza Behzad | Order of Merit and Management | Third Order | Mahmoud Ahmadinejad | August 27, 2006 |
| 58. | Abdolvahid Kalantari | Order of Merit and Management | Third Order | Mahmoud Ahmadinejad | August 27, 2006 |
| 59. | Mohammad Fadayi Ashyani | Order of Merit and Management | Third Order | Mahmoud Ahmadinejad | August 27, 2006 |
| 60. | Abbas Rashidi | Order of Merit and Management | Third Order | Mahmoud Ahmadinejad | August 27, 2006 |
| 61. | Habibollah Sayyari | Order of Merit and Management | Second Order | Mahmoud Ahmadinejad | October 27, 2012 |
| 62. | Behrouz Moradi | Order of Merit and Management | Second Order | Mahmoud Ahmadinejad | June 12, 2013 |
| 63. | Nasrin Soltankhah | Order of Merit and Management | Second Order | Mahmoud Ahmadinejad | June 12, 2013 |
| 64. | Gholam-Hossein Elham | Order of Merit and Management | Second Order | Mahmoud Ahmadinejad | August 7, 2013 |
| 65. | Mohammad Javad Zarif | Order of Merit and Management | First Order | Hassan Rouhani | February 8, 2016 |
| 66. | Abbas Araghchi | Order of Merit and Management | Second Order | Hassan Rouhani | February 8, 2016 |
| 67. | Majid Takht-Ravanchi | Order of Merit and Management | Second Order | Hassan Rouhani | February 8, 2016 |
| 68. | Hamid Baeidinejad | Order of Merit and Management | Third Order | Hassan Rouhani | February 8, 2016 |

== Classes ==
It comes in three classes:

1st Order

2nd Order

3rd Order

== See also ==
- Order of Freedom (Iran)
- Order of Altruism
- Order of Work and Production
- Order of Research
- Order of Mehr
- Order of Justice (Iran)
- Order of Construction
- Order of Knowledge
- Order of Education and Pedagogy
- Order of Persian Politeness
- Order of Independence (Iran)
- Order of Service
- Order of Courage (Iran)
- Order of Culture and Art
