= Order of Service =

Iranian award of honor

- First class of the Order
- Type: National order
- Established: Established in the reign of Reza Shah; Re-established by Council of Iran Ministers on 21 November 1990 in Islamic Republic
- Country: Islamic Republic of Iran
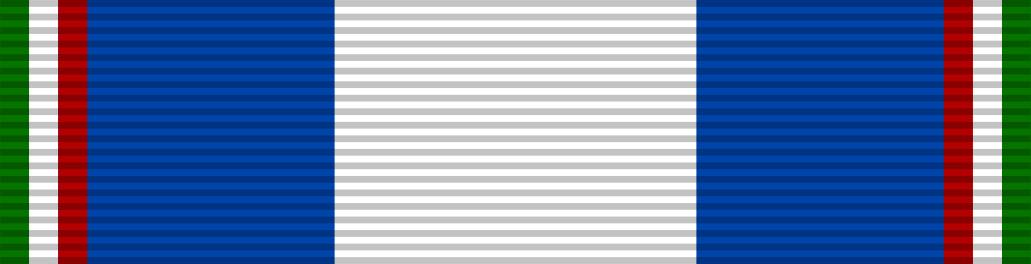
- Ribbon
- Awarded by: President of Iran
- Grades: First Order; Second Order; Third Order

Order of Service (Persian: نشان خدمت) is an Iranian state general order. For the first time, it was established and awarded during the reign of Reza Shah in the Pahlavi era. After the 1979 Iranian Revolution, it was re-established by "Council of Iran Ministers" on 21 November 1990. The order has three classes. According to Article 12 of the Regulations on the Awarding of Government Orders of Iran, the Order of Service awarded by President of Iran to recognize "achieving distinguished success" in one of the following:

1. Truly and consistent efforts in accomplishing responsibility and servitude
2. Aiding the oppressed and deprived people

== Classes ==
It comes in three classes:

1st Order

2nd Order

3rd Order

== Recipients ==
No.	Recipient Name	Badge	Type	Donated by	Date
1.	Reza Rahimi Tari	Order of Service	Second Order	Akbar Hashemi Rafsanjani	February 23, 1995
2.	Abdollah Mohammad Hashem	Order of Service	Third Order	Akbar Hashemi Rafsanjani	February 24, 1996
3.	Mohammad Sadegh Afshar	Order of Service	Third Order	Akbar Hashemi Rafsanjani	April 25, 1996
4.	Abdolmohammad Darab Darbsaz	Order of Service	Third Order	Akbar Hashemi Rafsanjani	July 10, 1996
5.	Ata Ahmadi	Order of Service	Third Order	Akbar Hashemi Rafsanjani	July 27, 1996
6.	Rasoul Zargarpour	Order of Service	Third Order	Akbar Hashemi Rafsanjani	August 28, 1996
7.	Ali Milani Hosseini	Order of Service	Third Order	Akbar Hashemi Rafsanjani	September 16, 1996
8.	Shafiqeh Rahideh	Order of Service	Third Order	Akbar Hashemi Rafsanjani	December 4, 1996
9.	Ahmad Sadegh Bonab	Order of Service	Third Order	Akbar Hashemi Rafsanjani	December 4, 1996
10.	Abolfazl Fatemizadeh	Order of Service	Second Order	Akbar Hashemi Rafsanjani	January 16, 1997
11.	Hossein Ali Shahriari	Order of Service	Third Order	Akbar Hashemi Rafsanjani	January 16, 1997
12.	Ali Akbar Sanatizadeh	Order of Service	Third Order	Akbar Hashemi Rafsanjani	January 16, 1997
13.	Mansour Mousavi Khaligh	Order of Service	Third Order	Akbar Hashemi Rafsanjani	January 16, 1997
14.	Abdolkarim Razavi Ardakani	Order of Service	Third Order	Akbar Hashemi Rafsanjani	January 16, 1997
15.	Mohammad Reza Fatemi	Order of Service	Third Order	Akbar Hashemi Rafsanjani	January 16, 1997
16.	Gholamreza Sahrayian	Order of Service	Third Order	Akbar Hashemi Rafsanjani	June 11, 1997
17.	Mehdi Safari	Order of Service	Third Order	Akbar Hashemi Rafsanjani	June 11, 1997
18.	Majid Maleki Tabaar	Order of Service	Third Order	Akbar Hashemi Rafsanjani	June 11, 1997
19.	Reza Maknoon	Order of Service	Third Order	Akbar Hashemi Rafsanjani	June 17, 1997
20.	Saeed Taghdisian	Order of Service	Third Order	Akbar Hashemi Rafsanjani	June 17, 1997
21.	Shahla Habibi	Order of Service	Second Order	Akbar Hashemi Rafsanjani	August 2, 1997
22.	Asghar Afshari	Order of Service	Third Order	Akbar Hashemi Rafsanjani	August 2, 1997
23.	Habibollah Bourbour Hassan Beigi	Order of Service	Third Order	Akbar Hashemi Rafsanjani	August 2, 1997
24.	Gholam Hossein Bolandian	Order of Service	Third Order	Akbar Hashemi Rafsanjani	August 2, 1997
25.	Majid Bahrami	Order of Service	Third Order	Akbar Hashemi Rafsanjani	August 2, 1997
26.	Ali Mousarreza	Order of Service	Third Order	Akbar Hashemi Rafsanjani	August 2, 1997
27.	Hassan Shahrestani	Order of Service	Third Order	Akbar Hashemi Rafsanjani	August 2, 1997
28.	Alireza Marandi	Order of Service	First Order	Mohammad Khatami	June 2, 1999
29.	Mohammad Reza Nematzadeh	Order of Service	Third Order	Mohammad Khatami	January 10, 2001
30.	Mehdi Karbasian	Order of Service	Second Order	Mohammad Khatami	January 9, 2003
31.	Mahmoud Khosravi	Order of Service	Third Order	Mohammad Khatami	August 4, 2003
32.	Ahmad Ali Noorbala	Order of Service	Second Order	Mohammad Khatami	August 3, 2004
33.	Mohammad Kordbacheh	Order of Service	Third Order	Mohammad Khatami	August 3, 2004
34.	Ali Akbar Samiee	Order of Service	Third Order	Mohammad Khatami	August 3, 2004
35.	Fereydoon Tohidi Moghaddam	Order of Service	Third Order	Mohammad Khatami	August 3, 2004
36.	Ebrahim Asgarian Damavandi	Order of Service	Third Order	Mohammad Khatami	August 3, 2004
37.	Bayazid Mardoukhi	Order of Service	Second Order	Mohammad Khatami	June 7, 2005
38.	Gholamreza Tajgardoon	Order of Service	Third Order	Mohammad Khatami	June 7, 2005
39.	Gholamreza Heydari Kord Zanganeh	Order of Service	Third Order	Mohammad Khatami	June 7, 2005
40.	Mohammad Ali Karimi	Order of Service	Third Order	Mohammad Khatami	June 7, 2005
41.	Hossein Malek-Afzali	Order of Service	Second Order	Mohammad Khatami	June 12, 2005
42.	Gholam Reza Aghazadeh	Order of Service	First Order	Mahmoud Ahmadinejad	August 27, 2006
43.	Abolghasem Khazali	Order of Service	First Order	Mahmoud Ahmadinejad	December 1, 2009
44.	Mir Ebrahim Seyyed Hatami	Order of Service	First Order	Mahmoud Ahmadinejad	September 19, 2011
45.	Mohammad Hashem Gharqi	Order of Service	First Order	Mahmoud Ahmadinejad	May 13, 2012
46.	Eskandar Momeni	Order of Service	First Order	Mahmoud Ahmadinejad	March 6, 2013
47.	Reza Sheykholeslam	Order of Service	First Order	Mahmoud Ahmadinejad	May 9, 2013
48.	Mehdi Safari	Order of Service	Second Order	Mahmoud Ahmadinejad	May 29, 2013
49.	Asadollah Asadian	Order of Service	Third Order	Mahmoud Ahmadinejad	May 29, 2013
50.	Mohammad Behzad	Order of Service	Third Order	Mahmoud Ahmadinejad	May 29, 2013
51.	Shahriar Afandizadeh	Order of Service	Third Order	Mahmoud Ahmadinejad	May 29, 2013
52.	Mohammad Ali Zanjireh-ee	Order of Service	Third Order	Mahmoud Ahmadinejad	May 29, 2013
53.	Mohammad Reza Rahimi	Order of Service	First Order	Mahmoud Ahmadinejad	June 12, 2013
54.	Ali Akbar Salehi	Order of Service	Second Order	Mahmoud Ahmadinejad	June 12, 2013
55.	Rostam Ghasemi	Order of Service	Second Order	Mahmoud Ahmadinejad	June 12, 2013
56.	Mehdi Ghazanfari	Order of Service	Second Order	Mahmoud Ahmadinejad	June 12, 2013
57.	Shamseddin Hosseini	Order of Service	Second Order	Mahmoud Ahmadinejad	June 12, 2013
58.	Mohammad Reza Farzin	Order of Service	Second Order	Mahmoud Ahmadinejad	June 12, 2013
59.	Pejman Rahimian	Order of Service	Third Order	Hassan Rouhani	February 8, 2016
60.	Gholamhossein Mohammadnia	Order of Service	Third Order	Hassan Rouhani	February 8, 2016
61.	Behrouz Kamalvandi	Order of Service	Third Order	Hassan Rouhani	February 8, 2016
62.	Meshkan Mashkour	Order of Service	Third Order	Hassan Rouhani	February 8, 2016
63.	Abdolrasoul Dorri-Esfahani	Order of Service	Third Order	Hassan Rouhani	February 8, 2016
64.	Reza Najafi	Order of Service	Third Order	Hassan Rouhani	February 8, 2016
65.	Mohsen Fakhrizadeh	Order of Service	Second Order	Hassan Rouhani	February 8, 2016

== See also ==
- Order of Merit and Management
- Order of Freedom (Iran)
- Order of Altruism
- Order of Work and Production
- Order of Research
- Order of Mehr
- Order of Justice (Iran)
- Order of Construction
- Order of Knowledge
- Order of Education and Pedagogy
- Order of Persian Politeness
- Order of Independence (Iran)
- Order of Courage (Iran)
