= Azarabadegan Medal =

- Presented by: Iran
- Status: No longer awarded
- Final award: December 1946

The Azarabadegan Medal was founded by Mohammad Reza Shah Pahlavi, the Shah of Iran, on 12 December 1946. In November 1945, the Azerbaijani Democratic Party formed a short-lived Soviet Union puppet state in Iranian Azerbaijan with Ja'far Pishevari as president. However, with the support of the United States and Britain, the Iranian army reentered Tabriz and dissolved the Azerbaijan People's Government. The Shah awarded the medal to the military soldiers involved in the battle.
