= Order of Altruism =

Iranian award of honor

- First Order Medal of Altruism; Iran National Order

Awarded by President of Iran
- Type: General Award, Badge of honor
- Established: By Council of Iran Ministers on November 21, 1990 and modified on June 27, 2007
- Country: Iran
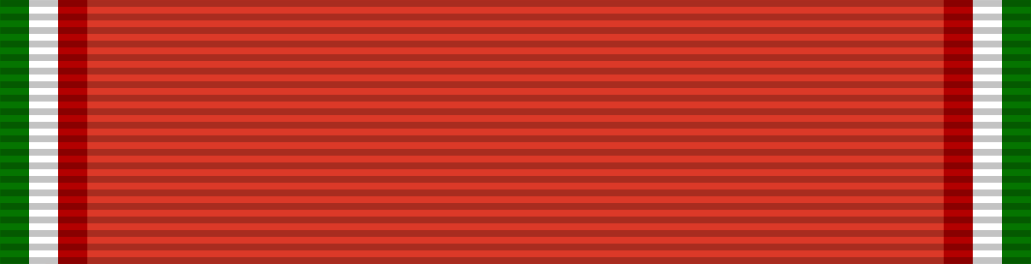
- Ribbon
- Grades: First Order; Second Order; Third Order

The Order of Altruism (Persian: نشان ایثار) is one of the badges of honor in Iran, established by "The Council of Iran Ministers" on November 21, 1990 and modified on June 27, 2007. The order has three classes, and is awarded by President of Iran. According to Article 15 of the Regulations on the Awarding of Government Orders of Iran, the Order of Altruism due to commemorate this valuable trait, is awarded to individuals who are privileged in some of the following respects:

1. Dedication and self-sacrifice for the sacred aims and purposes of the Islamic system, especially the sacrifices during the glorious victory of the Islamic Revolution and the sacred defense, and the provision of outstanding services to upbuild the country or to preserve and enhance the sacred system of the Islamic Republic
2. Enduring material damages to provide critical and essential service
3. Continuance effective social philanthropy and founding charities and establishing scientific, research and educational institutions in the community

== Recipients ==
In addition to Article 15 of the Regulations on the Awarding of Government Orders of Iran (approved on November 21, 1990) stating the conditions for receiving the Order of Altruism, new conditions approved on February 22, 1995, May 23, 2007, October 21, 2009 and January 7, 2017 for granting this order to those injured in the Iran-Iraq war and fathers and mothers those who have lost their children in conjunction with the Iran-Iraq war or process of trying to win the Iranian Revolution, by the Council of Ministers of the time.

According to these decrees, so many people have been eligible to receive the Order of Altruism, that in every term this order was awarded to many of them by the president of the time.

In addition to these, the following people have also received this order:

| No. | Recipient Name | Badge | Type | Donator | Date |
|---|---|---|---|---|---|
| 1. | Shahrbanoo Jalali | Order of Altruism | First Order | Akbar Hashemi Rafsanjani | May 29, 1995 |
| 2. | Fatemeh Dehqannejad | Order of Altruism | First Order | Akbar Hashemi Rafsanjani | May 29, 1995 |
| 3. | Golbas Samie Ghahfarrokhi | Order of Altruism | First Order | Akbar Hashemi Rafsanjani | May 29, 1995 |
| 4. | Soqra Hajalinaghi | Order of Altruism | First Order | Akbar Hashemi Rafsanjani | May 29, 1995 |
| 5. | Kobra Meknatian | Order of Altruism | First Order | Akbar Hashemi Rafsanjani | May 29, 1995 |
| 6. | Effat Aliasgari | Order of Altruism | First Order | Akbar Hashemi Rafsanjani | May 29, 1995 |
| 7. | Setareh Akbari | Order of Altruism | First Order | Akbar Hashemi Rafsanjani | May 29, 1995 |
| 8. | Molki Talebi | Order of Altruism | First Order | Akbar Hashemi Rafsanjani | May 29, 1995 |
| 9. | Halimeh Khatoon Khanian | Order of Altruism | First Order | Akbar Hashemi Rafsanjani | May 29, 1995 |
| 10. | Fatemeh Abbasverdi | Order of Altruism | First Order | Akbar Hashemi Rafsanjani | May 29, 1995 |
| 11. | Sakineh Vaezi | Order of Altruism | First Order | Akbar Hashemi Rafsanjani | May 29, 1995 |
| 12. | Jalal Roghani | Order of Altruism | First Order | Akbar Hashemi Rafsanjani | May 29, 1995 |
| 13. | Mohammadreza Shayeq | Order of Altruism | Second Order | Akbar Hashemi Rafsanjani | August 26, 1995 |
| 14. | Mahnaz Darabi | Order of Altruism | Third Order | Akbar Hashemi Rafsanjani | December 11, 1996 |
| 15. | Abdollah Moradi | Order of Altruism | Third Order | Akbar Hashemi Rafsanjani | January 21, 1997 |
| 16. | Abolfath Lameyi | Order of Altruism | Second Order | Mohammad Khatami | June 9, 1999 |
| 17. | Mehrzad Fathi | Order of Altruism | First Order | Mohammad Khatami | June 9, 1999 |
| 18. | Hassan Omidzadeh Bijarsari | Order of Altruism | Third Order | Mohammad Khatami | January 30, 2001 |
| 19. | Morad Ali Shirani | Order of Altruism | Third Order | Mohammad Khatami | January 30, 2001 |
| 20. | Parviz Shateri | Order of Altruism | Second Order | Mohammad Khatami | January 9, 2003 |
| 21. | Mohammad Hossein Jafari | Order of Altruism | Third Order | Mohammad Khatami | August 4, 2003 |
| 22. | Fatemeh Nahidi | Order of Altruism | Third Order | Mohammad Khatami | August 3, 2004 |
| 23. | Marzieh Hadidchi | Order of Altruism | Third Order | Mohammad Khatami | August 3, 2004 |
| 24. | Alireza Heydari Zare | Order of Altruism | Third Order | Mohammad Khatami | August 3, 2004 |
| 25. | Sediqeh Ajli | Order of Altruism | First Order | Mohammad Khatami | May 24, 2005 |
| 26. | Abdolvahab Shahhosseini | Order of Altruism | First Order | Mohammad Khatami | May 24, 2005 |
| 27. | Alimohammad Barforoush | Order of Altruism | First Order | Mohammad Khatami | May 24, 2005 |
| 28. | Yaqoub Najjarian | Order of Altruism | First Order | Mohammad Khatami | May 24, 2005 |
| 29. | Ali Zakerinejad | Order of Altruism | First Order | Mohammad Khatami | May 24, 2005 |
| 30. | Qolamhossein Jami | Order of Altruism | First Order | Mohammad Khatami | May 24, 2005 |
| 31. | Houshang Taherzadeh | Order of Altruism | Second Order | Mohammad Khatami | May 24, 2005 |
| 32. | Habib Habibzadeh | Order of Altruism | Third Order | Mohammad Khatami | May 24, 2005 |
| 33. | Ahmad Ahmad | Order of Altruism | Third Order | Mohammad Khatami | May 24, 2005 |
| 34. | Davoud Meifour | Order of Altruism | Third Order | Mohammad Khatami | June 7, 2005 |
| 35. | Hossein Qomi | Order of Altruism | First Order | Mahmoud Ahmadinejad | May 13, 2007 |
| 36. | Yadollah Samieenia | Order of Altruism | First Order | Mahmoud Ahmadinejad | May 13, 2007 |
| 37. | Ali Amini Noor | Order of Altruism | First Order | Mahmoud Ahmadinejad | May 13, 2007 |
| 38. | Esmaeel Rezayi | Order of Altruism | First Order | Mahmoud Ahmadinejad | May 13, 2007 |
| 39. | Batoul Janidi Jafari | Order of Altruism | First Order | Mahmoud Ahmadinejad | May 13, 2007 |
| 40. | Hosseinali Manouchehri Najafabadi | Order of Altruism | First Order | Mahmoud Ahmadinejad | May 13, 2007 |
| 41. | Reza Shekarabi | Order of Altruism | First Order | Mahmoud Ahmadinejad | May 13, 2007 |
| 42. | Yousefali Esmaeeli Nodolati | Order of Altruism | First Order | Mahmoud Ahmadinejad | May 13, 2007 |
| 43. | Ebrahim Haji Bagheri Fard | Order of Altruism | Second Order | Mahmoud Ahmadinejad | May 13, 2007 |
| 44. | Khalil Taghavi | Order of Altruism | Second Order | Mahmoud Ahmadinejad | May 13, 2007 |
| 45. | Taghi Saedi | Order of Altruism | Second Order | Mahmoud Ahmadinejad | May 13, 2007 |
| 46. | Manijeh Beyk Esfahani | Order of Altruism | Second Order | Mahmoud Ahmadinejad | May 13, 2007 |
| 47. | Fatemeh Morad Eskandari | Order of Altruism | Second Order | Mahmoud Ahmadinejad | May 13, 2007 |
| 48. | Shamsollah Emam Panahi | Order of Altruism | Second Order | Mahmoud Ahmadinejad | May 13, 2007 |
| 49. | Ali Gharavian | Order of Altruism | Second Order | Mahmoud Ahmadinejad | May 13, 2007 |
| 50. | Hassanali Dehqani Poudeh | Order of Altruism | Second Order | Mahmoud Ahmadinejad | May 13, 2007 |
| 51. | Alireza Bahmaninejad | Order of Altruism | Second Order | Mahmoud Ahmadinejad | May 13, 2007 |
| 52. | Ahmad Sabet | Order of Altruism | Second Order | Mahmoud Ahmadinejad | May 13, 2007 |
| 53. | Sanam Alikhani Vavdarreh | Order of Altruism | Second Order | Mahmoud Ahmadinejad | May 13, 2007 |
| 54. | Abolghasem Jafarzadeh | Order of Altruism | Second Order | Mahmoud Ahmadinejad | May 13, 2007 |
| 55. | Ghahraman Fazeli | Order of Altruism | Second Order | Mahmoud Ahmadinejad | May 13, 2007 |

== Types ==
The Order of Altruism has three types of medal:

First Order Medal

Second Order Medal

Third Order Medal

== See also ==
- Order of Freedom (Iran)
- Order of Work and Production
- Order of Research
- Order of Mehr
- Order of Justice (Iran)
- Order of Construction
- Order of Knowledge
- Order of Education and Pedagogy
- Order of Persian Politeness
- Order of Independence (Iran)
- Order of Service
- Order of Courage (Iran)
- Order of Culture and Art
- Order of Merit and Management
