= Nasrin Moazami =

Iranian scientist

Nasrin Moazami is an Iranian medical microbiologist and biotechnologist. She received her Ph.D. in 1976 from the Faculty of Medicine at Laval University. Moazami is the pioneer of biotechnology and microalgae-based fuels in Iran.

== Career ==
She established a research center in 1987, the only Regional Reference Center for Biotechnology in West and Central Asia. She also founded the Persian Type Culture Collection (PTCC). In 1985, she became an affiliated member of the World Federation for Culture Collections (WFCC), and in 1992, she joined the MIRCEN International Network, a collection of microorganisms with industrial importance.

In 1986, Moazami managed a joint project between the Iranian Research Organization for Science and Technology (IROST), the UNDP, and UNESCO. The project evaluated the feasibility of using Bacillus thuringiensis to control malaria vectors in southern Iran. Their slow-release formulation was patented at the European Patent Office in 2003, and the project was later transferred to a private company, which began production of 1,000 tons per year in 2004.

From 1990 to 2004, she served as Head of the IROST Biotechnology Department and from 2004 to 2010, she was Director of the Institute of Advanced Technology at IROST.

In 1995, she established the Persian Gulf Biotechnology Research Center—now the Qeshm Microalgae Biorefinery— on Qehm Island, Iran. This center has become a key research hub for applied marine biotechnology.

From 2001 to 2010, she was the principal investigator of an Iranian bio-diesel and bio-ethanol-based microalgae project. In 2011, she took on the role of manager for the National Project to scale up microalgae-based diesel, ethanol, and other valuable microalgae products in the Persian Gulf knowledge village.

In 2014, the expertise from this project was transferred to the Iranian private sector under the name "Qeshm MicroAlgae Biorefinery" (QMAB). The first 100 hectares of microalgae cultivation are currently under construction on Qeshm Island, with plans to expand to 1,000 hectares within three years (www.qmabco.com).

In 2016, Professor Moazami was appointed to the Scientific Board of UNESCO's International Basic Sciences Program (IBSP) (http://en.irost.org/content/professor-nasrin-moazami-appointed-member-ibsp-unesco).

In 2022, the International Committee on Taxonomy of Viruses (ICTV) named a new genus, Moazamivirus, which includes three (3) species, in honor of Professor Nasrin Moazami.

== Recognition ==
- On July 27, 1995, Moazami was presented with the "Chevalier de I'Ordre des Palmes Académiques," a citation for outstanding research.
- In 1996, the President of Iran presented her the National Governmental Award for research.
- In 2007, Fourth Pioneer of Excellence recognized her contribution to improving quality of life in Queshm Island during the last 20 years.
- In 2015, the “Allameh Tabatabi Award,” as outstanding professional researcher of country.
- In 2016, the “European Award,” as "Woman Entrepreneur for Business competence licence" and
- the “Alborz Foundation Award,” as outstanding professional scientist of country.

== Selected publications ==
- Moazami, N. (1997). "Large Scale Production of Slow Release Formation of Bacillus thuringiensis M-H-4 in Qeshm Island." Proceeding of Second Technical Meeting & The First Regional Conference on Combating Malaria IROST, UNDP/UNESCO.
- Moazami, N. (2001). "Revival of Saline and Desert Land, Using Biofertilizers, Micorrlizae, Biopolymer Supervater Absorbent and Biosaline Agriculture." The first International Conference on Biotechnology application for the arid regions 9–11 April Kuwait.
- Moazami, N. (2002). "Biopesticides production." In Encyclopedia of Life Support Systems. EOLSS publishers Co. 3- Encyclopedias of Biological Physiological and Health Sciences.
- Moazami, N. (2004). "Application of Synchrotron Radiation System in Nanobiotechnology and Biotechnology." Proceedings of 3-Sesame Users Meeting of Synchrotron-light for Experimental Science and Application in the Middle East, October 11–13, Antalya, Turkey.
- Moazami, N. (2004). "Extremophile Culture Collection from Extreme area of Iran." Proceedings of 2nd International Congress on Traditional Medicine and Materia Media. October 4–7, Tehran, Iran.
- Moazami, N. (2004). "The Role of Bacillus Thuringiensis H-14 In Malaria Control." The Forth Inter-country Meeting of National Malaria Program Manages. 22–25 May, Isfahan, Iran.
- Moazami, N (2005). "Controlling Malaria, The Vampire of the Technological Age". A World of Science. 3 (2): 16–19.
- Moazami, N. (2005). "Overview of Novel Anticancer Drug Targets." Proceedings of the First International Symposium of Molecular Technology: Cell Cycle and Cell Death, Cellular and Molecular Perspectives, Basic and Clinical Aspects. July 2005, Tehran, Iran.
- Moazami, N. (2007). "Biopesticides production, Encyclopedia of Life Support Systems." Industrial Biotechnology, Vol. 6, EOLSS publishers Co.
- Moazami, N. (2011). "Biological Control". Comprehensive Biotechnology. pp. 731–9. doi:10.1016/B978-0-08-088504-9.00235-X. ISBN 978-0-08-088504-9.
- Moazami, Nasrin; Ranjbar, Reza; Ashori, Alireza; Tangestani, Mehrnoush; Nejad, Ali Sheykhi (2011). "Biomass and lipid productivities of marine microalgae isolated from the Persian Gulf and the Qeshm Island". Biomass and Bioenergy. 35 (5): 1935–9. doi:10.1016/j.biombioe.2011.01.039.
- Moazami, N., Ranjbar, R., Ashori, A., Tangestani, M., Eghtesadi, R., Sheykhi Negad, A. (2011) "IROST Green Technology Pilot Plant: Microalgae Based Fuel." Proceeding of International Workshop on Science and Technology policy and sustainable Development.5–7 January, Tehran, IRAN.
- Moazami, N., Ranjbar, R., Ashori, A., Tangestani, M., Sheyki Nejad, A. (2011). "Investigation on Biomass and Lipid Productivity of Iranian Cultivated Microalgae for Large Scale Biodiesel Production." First International Conference on Algal Biomass, Biofuels & Bioproducts, St. Louis, USA
- Moazami, Nasrin; Ashori, Alireza; Ranjbar, Reza; Tangestani, Mehrnoush; Eghtesadi, Roghieh; Nejad, Ali Sheykhi (2012). "Large-scale biodiesel production using microalgae biomass of Nannochloropsis". Biomass and Bioenergy. 39: 449–53. doi:10.1016/j.biombioe.2012.01.046.
- Eurocert Cooperation in Granting European Patent to " A new Microalgae species and its application for Bioenergy production for animal and human consumption, in obtaining bioactive ingredient" http://eurocert.org.uk/Pages/view.aspx?PostID=1281
- Moazami, Nasrin; Ashori, Alireza; Ranjbar, Reza; Tangestani, Mehrnoush; Eghtesadi, Roghieh; Nejad, Ali Sheykhi (2012). "Large-scale biodiesel production using microalgae biomass of Nannochloropsis". Biomass and Bioenergy. 39: 449–453. doi:10.1016/j.biombioe.2012.01.046.
- Moazami, N., Fatemeh Boshagh, and Khosrow Rostami, “Biohydrogen production by immobilized Enterobacter aerogenes on functionalized multi-walled carbon nanotube, International Journal of Hydrogen Energy 44/28 (2019), 14395-14405 https://doi.org/10.1016/j.ijhydene.2018.11.199
- Moazami, N., Fatemeh Boshagh, and Khosrow Rostami, “Immobilization of Enterobacter aerogenes on carbon fiber and activated carbon to study hydrogen production enhancement,” Biochemical Engineering Journal 144 (2019), 64–72. https://doi.org/10.1016/j.bej.2019.01.014
- Moazami, N., Mahroo Seyed Jafari Olia, Mehrdad Azin, Abbas Akhavan Sepahy, “Feasibility of improving carbohydrate content of Chlorella S4, a native isolate from the Persian Gulf using sequential statistical designs,” Biofuels 10 (2019). https://doi.org/10.1080/17597269.2019.1679572
- Moazami, N., Mahroo Seyed Jafari Olia, Mehrdad Azin, Abbas Akhavan Sepahi, “Miniaturized culture method for the statistical study of growth rate and carbohydrate content of Picochlorum sp. D8 isolate from the Persian Gulf,” Renewable Energy 149 (2019) https://doi.org/10.1016/j.renene.2019.12.069
- Moazami, N., Mahboobeh Akbarizare, Hamideh Ofoghi, Mahnaz Hadizadeh, “In Vitro Assessment of the Cytotoxic Effects of Secondary Metabolites from Spirulina Platensis on Heptocellullar Carcinoma,” Egyptian Liver Journal 10/11, 2020 https://doi.org/10.1186/s43066-020-0018-3
- Moazami, N., Salma Karamad Yazdanabad, Abdolreza Samimi, Soheila Shokrollahzadeh, Davood Mohebbi Kalhori, María José Ibánez González, Tania Mazzuca Sobczuk, and Emilio Molina Grima, “Microalgae biomass dewatering by forward osmosis: Review and critical challenges, Algal Research 56, 2021 https://doi.org/10.1016/j.algal.2021.102323
- Moazami, N., Mahroo Seyed Jafari Olia, Mehrdad Azin, Abbas Akhavan Sepahi, “Screening of microalgae isolates of the Persian Gulf and evaluation of their potential as the promising bioethanol feedstock,” International Journal of Green Energy, 2021 https://doi.org/10.1080/15435075.2021.1968872
- Moazami, N., Mahroo Seyed Jafari Olia, Mehrdad Azin, “Application of a statistical design to evaluate bioethanol production from chlorella S4 biomass after acid –Thermal pretreatment,” Renewable Energy 182, 2021 https://doi.org/10.1016/j.renene.2021.10.019
- Moazami, N., Mahbobe Ghanbarzadeh, Mohammad Hassan Shahavi, Saeed Mirdamadi, “Study of bioactive compounds in Arthrospira platensis MGH‑1 fortified with micronutrients of iron, zinc, and manganese,” Journal of Applied Phycology 34, 2022 https://doi.org/10.1007/s10811-022-02797-w
- Moazami, N., Fatemeh Boshagh, Khosrow Rostami, “Dark fermentative hydrogen production in packed-bed bioreactor using the Persian Gulf dead coral, ceramic saddle, and ceramic ball as support matrixes,” International Journal of Hydrogen Energy July 2023 https://doi.org/10.1016/j.ijhydene.2023.06.344

=== Books ===
- Collection of Fungi and Industrial and Infectious Bacteria in Iran (in Persian), Tehran: IROST, 1989.
- Introduction to biotechnology research and development (in Persian), Tehran: Taribat Modares University Press, Tehran, 1990.
- Combating Malaria: A Collection of articles, Tehran: IROST, 1997.
- Biology and Biotechnology of the Sea (in Persian), Tehran: National Institute of Genetic Engineering and Biotechnology, 2011.
- Microalgae-Biotechnology (زیست شناسی و زیست فناوری ریز جلبک ها), Tehran: Iran University Press, 2018.
- Biotechnology of Microalgae (زیست فناوری ماکروالگ ها), Tehran: Entesharat Afrand, 2025.

== Sources ==
- "Countries unite against malaria". UNESCO Natural Sciences Portal (UNESCO). May 2005.
- "Controlling malaria, the vampire of the technological age". A World of Science (UNESCO). April–June 2005.
- "Middle East Connections". Chemical & Engineering News. 28 January 2008.
