= Order of Freedom (Iran) =

Iranian award of honor

- Order of Freedom Medal; Iran National Order

Awarded by President of Iran
- Type: Excellence Award, Badge of honor
- Established: By Council of Iran Ministers on November 21, 1990
- Country: Iran
- Ribbon

The Order of Freedom (Persian: نشان آزادی) is one of the badges of honor in Iran, established by "Council of Iran Ministers" on November 21, 1990. The order is awarded by President of Iran. According to the Article 4 of the Regulations on the Awarding of Government Orders of Iran, the Order of Freedom is awarded to persons who hold one of the first order of General or Expertise awards and continue to be qualified to serve the sacred aims of the Islamic system.

== Details ==
The Order of Freedom is one of the Iran Excellence awards. The order has only one grade and is awarded a maximum of 8 in each term of president office.

== Advantages ==
According to the Article 22 of the Regulations on the Awarding of Government Orders of Iran (approved on November 21, 1990 and modified on December 26, 2001) the advantages of receiving the Order of Freedom are as follows:

- Material advantages
  - Donate 200 Bahar Azadi Coin to the recipients
- Immaterial advantages
  - Attending formal ceremonies and rituals
  - Publish name and profile of order holders in periodic collections
  - Installation of image and memorial plaque in recipients municipality of birthplace or institution and place of service
  - Priority in studying opportunities and getting the facilities needed to carry out research and investigation projects

== See also ==
- Order of Altruism
- Order of Work and Production
- Order of Research
- Order of Mehr
- Order of Justice (Iran)
- Order of Construction
- Order of Knowledge
- Order of Education and Pedagogy
- Order of Persian Politeness
- Order of Independence (Iran)
- Order of Service
- Order of Courage (Iran)
- Order of Culture and Art
- Order of Merit and Management
