= Order of Zolfaghar =

Iranian military honour

- The Star and Ribbon of the Islamic Republic

Awarded by Commander-in-Chief of the Iranian Armed Forces
- Type: Chivalric and dynastic order
- Royal house: House of Pahlavi (formerly)
- Ribbon: IRIA Zolfaghar Ribbon
- Supreme Leader: Mojtaba Khamenei
- Grades: Knight Grand Officer; Knight Officer; Knight

Precedence
- Next (higher): None (highest)
- Next (lower): Order of Fath
- ribbon of the Islamic Republic ribbon of Imperial Iran

The Order of Zolfaghar (Persian: نشان ذوالفقار, romanized: Neshan-e Zolfaghar) is the highest military honour of Iran. It was established in 1856 as the Decoration of the Commander of the Faithful, by Naser al-Din Shah Qajar. In 1925, it was given its current name by Reza Shah. It is the pinnacle of the imperial honours system, limited to the sovereign and those who had performed outstanding acts of patriotism.

== History ==
Founded during the Qajar era in 1856, the Decoration of the Commander of the Faithful was created by Naser al-Din Shah Qajar to commemorate the recapture of Herat. During the Pahlavi era in 1925, Reza Shah made it an exclusively military order and renamed it the Order of Zolfaghar after Zulfiqar, the two-pointed sword of Ali, the son-in-law of prophet Muhammad.

The original Star of the Order comprised an enameled five-pointed star, with an inscription representing Imam Ali on a red boss in the center, mounted over two crossed curved Zolfaghar swords and a sunburst of rays, as seen in the traditional Lion and Sun symbol.

The Star of the Islamic Republic is larger, simpler and more stylised, comprising a golden eight-pointed star within a silver eight-pointed star; stylised inscriptions on the stars provide decoration and contrast.

The Order of Zolfaghar consists of three classes:

- 1st Class: worn with a badge and a sash
- 2nd Class: worn with a collar, as a neck-order
- 3rd Class: worn as a medal.

It was revived in 2019 when Major General Qasem Soleimani received the decoration, the first time it had been awarded since 1979 Iranian revolution.

The Order of Zolfaghar at its foundation

== Recipients ==
=== Knight Grand Officer ===
None

=== Knight Officer ===
None

=== Knight ===
- Qasem Soleimani (2019)

== See also ==
- Order of Aftab
- Neshan-e Aqdas
- Order of the Lion and the Sun
