= Order of Courage (Iran) =

Iranian award of honor

- First class of the Order
- Type: National order
- Established: By Council of Iran Ministers on November 21, 1990
- Country: Islamic Republic of Iran
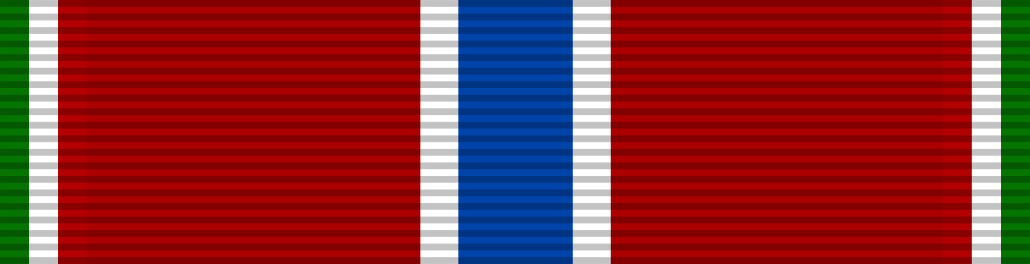
- Ribbon
- Awarded by: President of Iran
- Grades: First Order; Second Order; Third Order

Order of Courage or Bravery (Persian: نشان شجاعت) is an Iranian state general order established by "The Council of Iran Ministers" on November 21, 1990. The order has three classes. According to Article 14 of the Regulations on the Awarding of Government Orders of Iran, the Order of Courage awarded by President of Iran to recognize "courage, a high class characteristic of human in achieving distinguished success" in one of the following:

1. Volunteer to accomplish a difficult task which is critical for the country
2. Accepting a serious state mission or a social duty that is accompanied by potential threats
3. Opportune use of physical power and skills to reach a high goal

== Recipients ==
No.	Recipient Name	Badge	Type	Donator	Date
1.	Rasoul Khadem	Order of Courage	First Order	Akbar Hashemi Rafsanjani	October 6, 1996
2.	Abbas Jadidi	Order of Courage	Second Order	Akbar Hashemi Rafsanjani	October 6, 1996
3.	Amir Reza Khadem	Order of Courage	Third Order	Akbar Hashemi Rafsanjani	October 6, 1996
4.	Mohammad Shahsavari	Order of Courage	Third Order	Akbar Hashemi Rafsanjani	January 16, 1997
5.	Habibollah Nazerian Khabari	Order of Courage	Third Order	Akbar Hashemi Rafsanjani	August 2, 1997
6.	Heydar Bahmani	Order of Courage	Third Order	Mohammad Khatami	January 10, 2001
7.	Hossein Rezazadeh	Order of Courage	First Order	Mohammad Khatami	January 9, 2003
8.	Alireza Dabir	Order of Courage	Second Order	Mohammad Khatami	January 9, 2003
9.	Hadi Saei	Order of Courage	Third Order	Mohammad Khatami	January 9, 2003
10.	Mohammad Taghi Maghoul	Order of Courage	Third Order	Mohammad Khatami	July 30, 2003
11.	Ali Daei	Order of Courage	Third Order	Mohammad Khatami	July 25, 2004
12.	Abolghasem Amangah	Order of Courage	Third Order	Mahmoud Ahmadinejad	April 4, 2007
13.	Mohammadreza Mirzayi Jaberi	Order of Courage	First Order	Mahmoud Ahmadinejad	May 13, 2007
14.	Mokhtar Noorafshan	Order of Courage	First Order	Mahmoud Ahmadinejad	May 13, 2007
15.	Gholamreza Hassani	Order of Courage	First Order	Mahmoud Ahmadinejad	April 3, 2011
16.	Mohammad Bana	Order of Courage	First Order	Mahmoud Ahmadinejad	September 19, 2012
17.	Kourosh Bagheri	Order of Courage	Third Order	Mahmoud Ahmadinejad	September 19, 2012
18.	Ali Akbar Salehi	Order of Courage	First Order	Hassan Rouhani	February 8, 2016
19.	Hossein Dehghan	Order of Courage	First Order	Hassan Rouhani	February 8, 2016
20.	Noorkhoda Mousavi	Order of Courage	First Order	Hassan Rouhani	March 7, 2016

== Classes ==
It comes in three classes:

1st Order

2nd Order

3rd Order

== See also ==
- Order of Merit and Management
- Order of Freedom (Iran)
- Order of Altruism
- Order of Work and Production
- Order of Research
- Order of Mehr
- Order of Justice (Iran)
- Order of Construction
- Order of Knowledge
- Order of Education and Pedagogy
- Order of Persian Politeness
- Order of Independence (Iran)
- Order of Service
- Order of Culture and Art
