= Order of Islamic Republic =

Iranian award of honor

Order of the Islamic Republic
- Type: National order
- Established: by Council of Iran Ministers on November 21, 1990
- Country: Islamic Republic of Iran
- Ribbon
- Eligibility: Foreign nationals
- Awarded by: President of Iran
- Grades: First Order; Second Order; Third Order

The Excellent Order of the Islamic Republic (Persian: نشان عالی جمهوری اسلامی, romanized: Nešān-e Āli-ye Jomhuri-ye Eslāmi) is Iran's state decoration of honour, established by "Council of Iran Ministers" on November 21, 1990. According to Article 5 of the Regulations on the Awarding of Government Orders of Iran, the Order of the Islamic Republic is awarded by the President of Iran to the heads and other officials of foreign countries, the highest executive of international organizations, or to prominent cultural, political, international characters recognized in any of the following respects:

1. The exaltation of the word Islam and the spread of the intellectual foundations of the Islamic Revolution
2. Defending the rights of the world's oppressed peoples
3. Act to liberate their country from cultural, economic and political colonization
4. Protect and preservation of their country from the aggression of superpowers or their subordinates
5. Acquisition of fundamental freedoms and human rights for the people of their country
6. Sensitive and appropriate support for Iran's positions on major international scenes
7. Taking anti-arrogant stances
8. Sincerely cooperate in establishing or developing healthy relations between the Islamic Republic of Iran and the country of in charge character
9. Continuously striving for peace and security and comfort in the world

== Recipients ==
Recipient	Country	Office	Date	Awarded By	Ref
Nelson Mandela (1918–2013)	South Africa	President (1994–1999)	31 January 2001 (1st class)	Mohammad Khatami	
Hugo Chávez (1954–2013)	Venezuela	President (2002–2013)	29 July 2006 (1st class)	Mahmoud Ahmadinejad	
Bashar al-Assad (1965– )	Syria	President (2000–2024)	2 October 2010 (1st class)	Mahmoud Ahmadinejad	
David Nieves Velásquez Caraballo	Venezuela	Ambassador to Iran (2009–2012)	5 September 2012 (3rd class)	Mahmoud Ahmadinejad	

== Classes ==
According to Article 6 of the Regulations on the Awarding of Government Orders of Iran, The Order of the Islamic Republic has three classes, which upon the recommendation of the Minister of Foreign Affairs and endorsed by the Cabinet, are awarded to the following qualified persons:

- First Order: Presidents and prime ministers and aligning characters
- Second Order: Ministers and aligning characters
- Third Order: Ambassadors and aligning characters
1st Order – sash with gold star, for heads of state and prime ministers

2nd Order – with silver star, for other ministers

3rd Order – chest badge with a ribbon, for ambassadors.

== See also ==
- Order of Islamic Revolution
- Order of Independence (Iran)
- Order of Freedom (Iran)
