= Order of Independence (Iran) =

Iranian state order

Excellent Order of Independence
- Type: National order
- Established: by Council of Iran Ministers on November 21, 1990
- Country: Islamic Republic of Iran
- Ribbon
- Awarded by: President of Iran

The Excellent Order of Independence (Persian: نشان عالی استقلال) is an Iranian state order, established by "Council of Iran Ministers" on November 21, 1990. According to "Article 3" of the "Regulations on the Awarding of Government Orders" of Iran, the "Order of Independence" is awarded by President of Iran to recognize "taking important offices and playing a key role in achieving high goals of the Islamic Republic of Iran with all–lateral effort in enlightening positions, distinguished innovations to reach self–sufficiency and independence in different aspects, saving the government from potential threats, helping global proliferation of Islamic revolution principles and other valuable services in critical and decisive periods of time".

The order has no classes, and is awarded by President of Iran, who is able to award 4 orders per term.

== Recipients ==
Recipient	Office	Date	Awarded By	Ref
Hassan Habibi (1937–2013)	First Vice President (1989–2001)	26 July 1997	Akbar Hashemi Rafsanjani	
Mir-Hossein Mousavi (1942– )	Prime Minister (1981–1989)	29 May 2005	Mohammad Khatami	
Hassan Firouzabadi (1951–2021)	Chief of Staff of the Armed Forces (1989–2016)	12 November 2008	Mahmoud Ahmadinejad	

== See also ==
- Order of Freedom (Iran)
- Order of Altruism
- Order of Work and Production
- Order of Research
- Order of Mehr
- Order of Justice (Iran)
- Order of Construction
- Order of Knowledge
- Order of Education and Pedagogy
- Order of Persian Politeness
- Order of Courage (Iran)
