= Order of Nasr =

- Type: Decoration
- Country: Iran
- Presented by: Commander-in-chief Supreme Leader of Iran
- Status: Currently awarded
- Ribbon of the medal

Precedence
- Equivalent: 1st class 2nd class 3rd class

Order of Nasr (Persian: نشان نصر, meaning Divine Support) is a military award of Iranian armed forces which is awarded by Commander-in-chief, Supreme Leader of Iran to recognize distinguished logistics contribution and support of the troops.

== Recipients ==
- Alireza Afshar
- Javad Azimifar
- Mohammad Bagheri
- Mohsen Fakhrizadeh (1st Class)
- Valiollah Fallahi
- Hassan Firouzabadi (1st class)
- Mohammad Hossein Jalali
- Mousa Namjoo
- Mohsen Rafighdoost
- Hassan Rouhani (1st class)
- Mohammad Salimi
- Qasem-Ali Zahirnejad
