= Order of Fath =

Fath Medal
- All grades of Order of Fath
- Type: Decoration
- Country: Iran
- Presented by: Commander-in-chief Supreme Leader of Iran
- Status: Currently awarded
- First award: 27 September 1989
- Ribbon of the medal

Precedence
- Equivalent: Fath grade 1 Fath grade 2 Fath grade 3

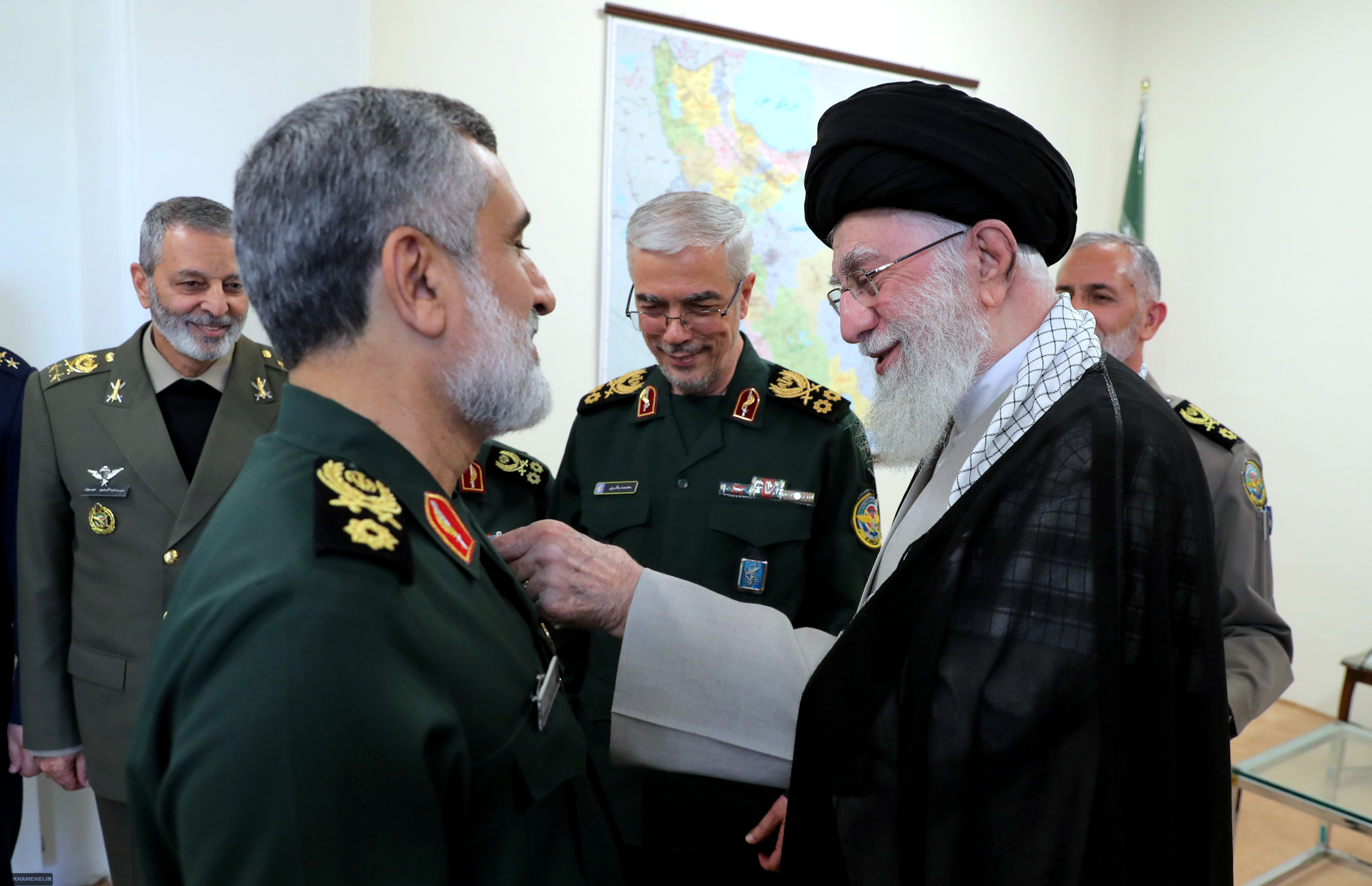
Hajizadeh receiving the Order of Fath from the Supreme Leader of Iran, after October 2024 Iranian strikes against Israel

The Fath Medal (Persian: نشان فتح, lit. 'Conquer Medal') is a military award of the Iranian armed forces which is awarded by the commander-in-chief, the Supreme Leader of Iran.

== History and description ==
First awarded on 27 September 1989, the medal shows three Palm leaves over Khorramshahr's grand mosque (as a symbol of resistance), the flag of Iran, and the word "Fath". It is a military award of the Iranian armed forces and is awarded by the commander-in-chief, the Supreme Leader of Iran.

As of 2008, the medal was awarded in three grades. Senior commanders are typically awarded a first class medal, colonels and brigadiers usually receive a second class award, while third class awards are granted to those ranked at or below lieutenant colonel.

== Recipients ==
=== First recipients (1989) ===
The first Order of Fath medals were conferred on 27 September 1989, after the Iran–Iraq War, with three recipients of the award at First Class level.

- The first recipient of the Order of Fath was Mohammad Hossein Fahmideh. Fahmideh's award was posthumous, as he was killed in November 1980 when, as a 13-year-old boy, he was fighting in the Iran–Iraq War. He disabled an Iraqi tank by jumping under it while wearing a belt of grenades from which he had removed the pins. In so doing, Fahmideh halted the advance of a line of tanks. Khomeini declared Fahmideh a national hero, stating that the "value of [Fahmideh's] little heart is greater than could be described by hundreds of tongues and hundreds of pens" and also calling him "our guide" who "threw himself under the enemy's tank with a grenade and destroyed it, thus drinking the elixir of matyrdom." Khomeini's government went on to provide a knapsack to every school child in Iran that showed "Fahmideh's heroic sacrifice under the tank and the grenades he used to blow himself up," and to include Fahmideh's story alongside that of other "martyrs" in textbooks intended to improve childhood literacy.
- Mohsen Rezaee, commander of Islamic Revolutionary Guard Corps
- Ali Sayad Shirazi, commander of Islamic Republic of Iran Army

Alongside them, 21 people received 2nd class medal and 29 people received the 3rd class medal.

=== 1990 ===
On 4 February 1990, a total of 210 men received the medal. The recipients included:

==== Islamic Republic of Iran Air Force ====
- Abbas Babaei (KIA, 2nd grade)
- Jalil Zandi (2nd grade)
- Mansour Sattari (2nd grade)
- Mohammad Daneshpour (2nd Grade)
- Massoud Monfared Niyaki (KIA, 2nd grade)
- Mostafa Ardestani (KIA, 2nd grade)

==== Army of the Guardians of the Islamic Revolution ====
- Mohammad Ebrahim Hemmat (KIA, 2nd grade)
- Mehdi Bakeri (KIA, 2nd grade)
- Hossein Kharrazi (KIA, 2nd grade)
- Yahya Rahim Safavi (2nd grade)
- Mohammad Ali Jafari (3rd grade)
- Qasem Soleimani (3rd grade)
- Ahmad Kazemi (3rd grade)

==== Both ====
- Ali Shamkhani (2nd grade)

=== 2014 ===
- Mohammad Pakpour, Commander of the Islamic Revolutionary Guard Corps Ground Forces

=== 2016 ===
- Ali Fadavi, deputy commander of Iranian Revolutionary Guards, 1st grade

=== 2018 ===
- Habibollah Sayyari, former commander of the Islamic Republic of Iran Navy

=== 2021 ===
- Kioumars Heydari, commander of the Islamic Republic of Iran Army Ground Forces

=== 2024 ===
- Abdolrahim Mousavi, Commander-in-Chief of the Islamic Republic of Iran Army
- Hossein Salami, Commander-in-Chief of the Islamic Revolutionary Guard Corps
- Amir Ali Hajizadeh, commander of the IRGC Aerospace Forces

=== Unknown date ===
- Akbar Hashemi Rafsanjani (1st grade)
- Hassan Rouhani (2nd grade)
