= Branch insignia =

Branch insignia may refer to:

- Iranian Army Branch Insignia
- Iranian Police Branch Insignia
- Romanian Armed Forces ranks and insignia
- Ukrainian Armed Forces branch insignia
- United States Army branch insignia
