= HDMS Holger Danske =

At least two ships have borne the name HDMS Holger Danske in service with the Royal Danish Navy:

- HDMS Holger Danske (1849), a paddle steamer in service until 1873 that served in the conflict with Austria and Prussia.
- HDMS Holger Danske (F338), a River-class frigate, formerly known as HMS Monnow acquired from the British Royal Navy.

== See also ==
- Holger Danske, an MHV900-class patrol boat in service with the Danish Home Guard.
