= Air Force Home Guard =

Part of the Danish Home Guard

- Flyverhjemmeværnet
- Active: 1953–present
- Country: Denmark
- Branch: Home Guard
- Role: Air force support
- Part of: Home Guard Command

The Air Force Home Guard (Danish: Flyverhjemmeværnet), is part of the Danish Home Guard. Its mission is to support the Royal Danish Air Force, the police and other national authorities in their emergency management by securing airports, performing aerial environmental patrols of national waters.

== Aircraft ==
The Air Force Home Guard operates two leased Britten-Norman Defender BN2A-21 aircraft flown by volunteer civilian pilots. The Defenders entered service in February 2016.

== Organization ==
The Air Force Home Guard is commanded by a full-service air force colonel. The commander is supported by a small staff of full-service personnel.

Municipalities with airfields or in the vicinity of airports have "air force home guard squadrons" – (100–150 riflemen), commanded by volunteer captains.

== Squadrons ==
The Flying Home Guard consists of 28 squadrons and two divisions:

- HVE: Hjemmeværnseskadrille (Home Guard Squadron)
- STHVE: Stabshjemmeværnseskadrille (Staff Home Guard Squadron)
- FSD: Flyverhjemmeværnsdeling (Aircraft Home Defense Division)

Squadron	Emblem	Name	Garrison
FSD231		Stevns	Faxe
HVE242		Sydfyn	Svendborg
HVE220		Nordvestsjælland	Kalundborg
HVE221		Arresø	Radarhoved Multebjerg
HVE223		Værløse	Værløse
HVE225		Roskilde	Roskilde Airport
HVE227		Københavns lufthavn	Copenhagen Airport
HVE228		Københavns lufthavn	Copenhagen Airport
HVE230		Midt- og Vestsjælland	Sorø
HVE232		Sydsjælland-Møn	Næstved
HVE233		Lolland-Falster	Sakskøbing
HVE240		Odense	Højstrup (Odense)
HVE243		Langeland	Torpe
HVE260		Vendsyssel	Understed
HVE261		Skive	Skive
HVE265		Hvidsten	Randers
HVE266		Aalborg	Aalborg Airport
HVE270		Flyvende eskadrille	Aalborg Air Base and Roskilde Airport
HVE272		Vestjylland	Ringkøbing
HVE273		Ikast	Herning
HVE274		Østjylland	Tirstrup Lufthavn
HVE275		Djursland	Tirstrup Lufthavn
HVE277		Karup	Air Base Karup
HVE280		Billund	Vejle
HVE281		Vestjylland	Varde
HVE282		Kongeåen	Brørup
HVE283		Trekanten	Kolding
HVE284		Skrydstrup	Flyvestation Skrydstrup
HVE286		Alssund	Kliplev
STHVE200		-	Flyvestation Aalborg; Flyvestation Karup; Flyvestation Skrydstrup; Jonstruplejren

== See also ==
- Luftmeldekorpset
