= LMK (disambiguation) =

LMK may refer to:

- Late Middle Korean, a period of the Korean language
- LMLK seal, seals used in Judah
- Limkheda railway station in Dahod, Gujarat, India
- Lippo Mall Kemang, a shopping mall in Jakarta, Indonesia
- "LMK" (song), by Kelela, 2017
- Luftmeldekorpset, a unit of the Danish Home Guard (1934–2004)
- Lego Monkie Kid, an animated series (2020-present)
