= Ranks and insignia of the Home Guard (Denmark) =

The Ranks and insignia of the Home Guard follows the NATO system of ranks and insignia, as does the rest of the Danish Defence.

== Historic ==
With the creation of the Home Guard in 1949, it adopted its own rank system, which was also used by the Women's Army Corps (Danish: Lottekorpset).

NATO Code	OF-5	OF-4	OF-3		OR-5	OR-4	OR-1
Insignia							No insignia
Danish (Lottekorpset)	Regionsleder (Lottechef)	Regionsleder (Regionslotte)	Distriktsleder (Distriktslotte)	Kompagnichef (Seniorlotte)	Delingsfører (Juniorlotte)	Gruppefører	Frivillig
English (Women's Army Corps)	Regional leader (Lotte Chief)	Regional leader (Regional lotte)	District leader (District lotte)	Company commander (Senior lotte)	Platoon commander (Junior lotte)	Group commander	Private

== Current ==
On 1 June 1962, the Home Guard adopted the ranks of the rest of the Danish Defence. However, only up to OF-7. In 2018, new ranks were created for the Menig (Volunteer) rank, as to better differentiate between Home Guard and standard forces.

Only the ranks OR-1, OR-4 to OR-7 and OF-1 to OF-3 is used normally by the Danish Home Guard.

=== Officers ===
NATO code	OF-10	OF-9	OF-8	OF-7	OF-6	OF-5	OF-4	OF-3	OF-2	OF-1
(Denmark) Army Home Guard
(Denmark) Army Home Guard				Generalmajor	Brigadegeneral	Oberst	Oberstløjtnant	Major	Kaptajn	Premierløjtnant	Løjtnant
(Denmark) Naval Home Guard
(Denmark) Naval Home Guard				Kontreadmiral	Flotilleadmiral	Kommandør	Kommandørkaptajn	Orlogskaptajn	Kaptajnløjtnant	Premierløjtnant	Løjtnant
(Denmark) Air Force Home Guard
(Denmark) Air Force Home Guard				Generalmajor	Brigadegeneral	Oberst	Oberstløjtnant	Major	Kaptajn	Premierløjtnant	Løjtnant

=== Enlisted ===
NATO code	OR-9		OR-8	OR-7	OR-6	OR-5	OR-4	OR-3	OR-2	OR-1
(Denmark) Army Home Guard
(Denmark) Army Home Guard	Command sergeant major of the Home Guard; Hjemmeværnets chefsergent	Warrant officer class I Chefsergent	Warrant officer class II; Seniorsergent	Sergeant first class Oversergent		Sergeant; Sergent	Corporal; Korporal	Lance corporal Overkonstabel af 1. grad	Private first class Overkonstabel	Private; Konstabel	Volunteer; Menig
(Denmark) Naval Home Guard
(Denmark) Naval Home Guard	Warrant officer of the Naval Home Guard; Marinehjemmeværnets Chefsergent	Master chief petty officer Chefsergent	Senior chief petty officer Seniorsergent	Chief petty officer Oversergent		Petty officer Sergent	Leading seaman Korporal	Able seaman Marinespecialist	Able seaman Marineoverkonstabel	Junior seaman Marinekonstabel	Volunteer; Menig
(Denmark) Air Force Home Guard
(Denmark) Air Force Home Guard	Warrant officer class I Chefsergent		Technical sergeant Seniorsergent	Flight sergeant Oversergent		Sergeant; Sergent	Corporal; Korporal	Lance corporal Flyverspecialist	Junior technician Flyveroverkonstabel	Aircraftman; Flyverkonstabel	Volunteer; Menig

Specialist

Along with the Menig rank, Specialist ranks were also introduced. These ranks were created to remove the need for leadership training at the lower ranks, as the selected functions no longer require actual leadership.

Specialist rank insignia
Army
Navy
Air Force
Danish	Hjemmeværnsspecialist 1	Hjemmeværnsspecialist 2
English	Home Guard specialist 1	Home Guard specialist 2
