= Special Support and Reconnaissance Company =

Coordinates: 55.8742°N 12.4300°E

- Særlig Støtte- og Rekognosceringskompagni
- Special Support and Reconnaissance Company Logo
- Active: 9 April 1959
- Country: Denmark
- Branch: Royal Danish Home Guard
- Type: Long-range reconnaissance patrol
- Role: Special reconnaissance
- Part of: Home Guard Command
- Headquarters: Airbase Skalstrup
- Nickname: SSR
- Website: Official Website

Commanders
- Chief of Defence Region Sjælland: Colonel Peer Sander Rouff
- Chief of SSR: Major Morten Rask

The Special Support and Reconnaissance Company (Danish: Særlig Støtte- og Rekognosceringskompagni), until 1 January 2007 known as the Patrol Company Army Operational Command (Danish: Patruljekompagniet) is the only remaining Long Range Surveillance Company (LRSC) / Long Range Reconnaissance Patrol (LRRP) Coy) in the Danish Armed Forces. The unit is part of the Danish Home Guard, and the only one of its kind, working directly for the Danish Army. It is the only unit in Danish Armed Forces that uses a woven fabric for its cap badge. Like with the other Danish SOFs, the accepted soldiers have one year probation, before they get their beret with the SSR insignia, and can be considered full members.

== History ==
The unit ancestor: the Homeguard Special Intelligence Patrols (SEP) was founded in 1959 during the Cold War. SEP was disbanded in 1994 and Patrol Coy Land Command Zealand was established from the SEP unit in 1995. The unit was first assigned as a Long Range Reconnaissance Patrol Coy to the Land Command Zealand (Corps-level) and later on the Danish Army Operational Command as Patrol Coy AOC. This unit - Patruljekompagniet - was transformed into the SSR on 1 January 2007 under the Homeguard Command. The unit celebrated the 50 year anniversary of Special Intelligence Patrols on 9 April 2009, as the oldest existing patrol unit of the Danish Homeguard and the only Special Reconnaissance unit of the Danish Homeguard.

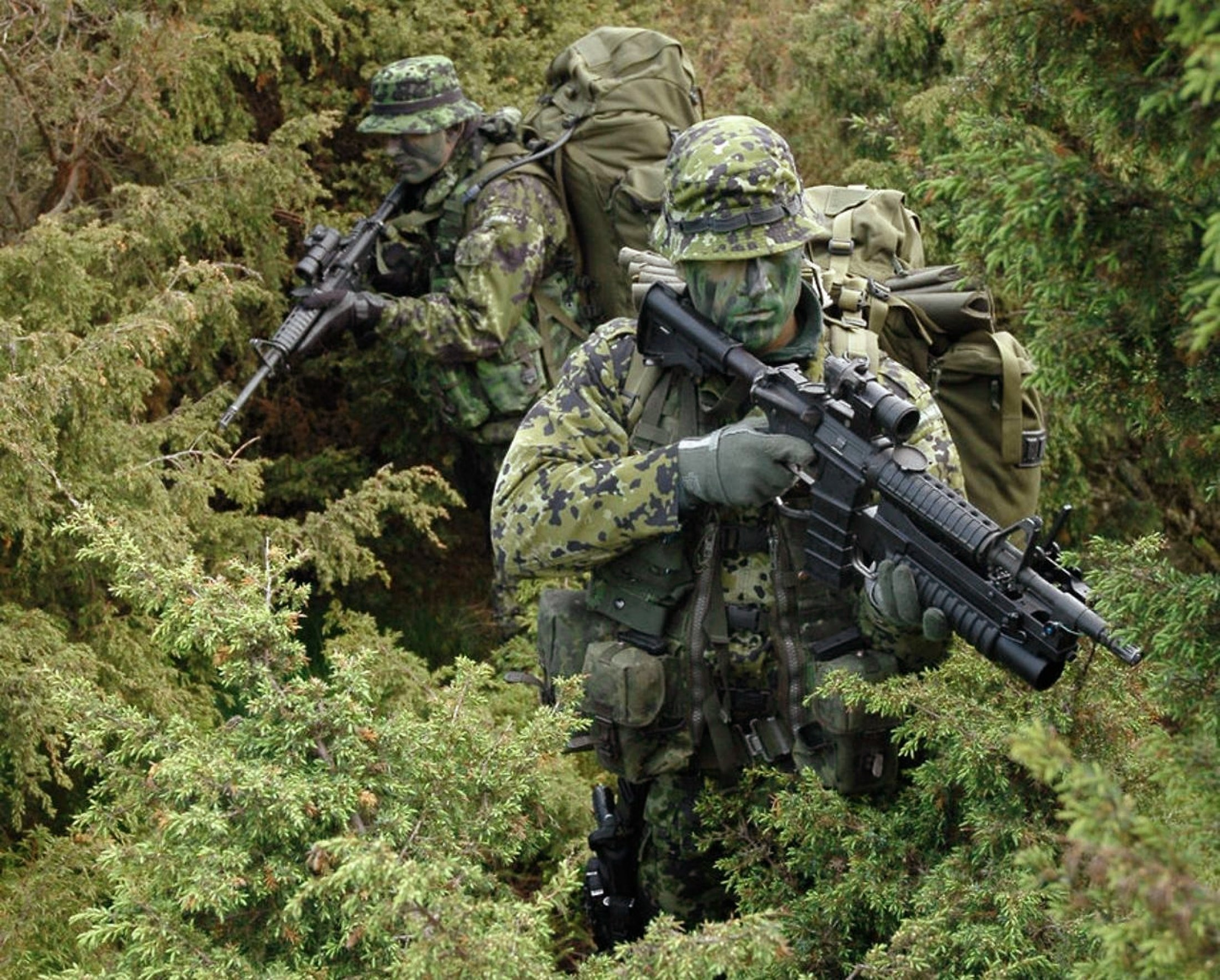
Soldiers from SSR on patrol

== Special Intelligence Patrols (SEP) ==
The Special Intelligence Patrols (Specielle Efterretningspatruljer or SEP) was founded in 1959 during the early cold war years and was specialised in collecting tactical intelligence behind enemy lines. Originally this was done using static observation sites but later on by insertable intelligence patrols operating behind enemy lines.

The legacy of the Special Intelligence Patrols has not been forgotten and the basic skills (LRS/LRRP) and special reconnaissance capabilities have been maintained and developed within Patruljekompagniet. During the cold war and until the turn of the century SEP - and later Patruljekompagniet - cross-trained with British TA Special Air Service units from 21 SAS (V) (Artists' Rifles) and 23 SAS (V) when they visited Denmark during large scale NATO exercises, as well as US Army Special Forces.

== Combat Swimmers ==
Patruljekompagniet has the capability to insert patrols covertly from the sea, due to their training with the Danish Frogman Corps, a naval special forces unit. They are trained as combat swimmers and are capable of various kinds of covert surface insertions.

== Close protection teams ==
In 2006, specially selected soldiers from the SSR, among others, were trained by the Danish Army Special Operations Forces Jægerkorpset as military close protection operators and participated in Danish Army Protection Teams (Protective Services Detail / DA Army PSD) in Iraq.

== SSR ==
At the beginning of 2007 Patruljekompagniet changed names to Hjemmeværnets Særlig- Støtte og Rekognosceringskompagni (SSR) - the Special- Support and Reconnaissance Coy. Patruljekompagniet was no longer available only to the Danish Army Operational Command (DAOC) but opened to all the Danish Defence Commands e.g. the Danish Navy Operational Command. This marked the end of Patruljekompagniet and the beginning of a new era for this historical specialised unit of volunteer soldiers.

NOTE: Some local homeguard scoutplatoons carry the name of "Patruljekompagni" for historical reasons, but has no patrolling capability beyond scoutplatoon-level and has no LRS-capability. Only SSR - the former Patruljekompagniet to the AOC - can be labeled a "Patruljekompagni" (LRSC/LRRP-COY) in military terms.
