= Military ranks of the Kingdom of Romania =

The Military ranks of the Kingdom of Romania were the military insignia used by the Kingdom of Romania. Following the abolition of the monarchy, the ranks were replaced with those of the Socialist Republic of Romania.

== Army ==
=== Commissioned officer ranks ===
The rank insignia of commissioned officers.

Rank group	General / flag officers					Senior officers			Junior officers
1846
1846			General inspector			Polcovnic		Maior	Căpitan	Porucic	Praporșcic
1861
1861			General primar	General de divizie	General de brigadă	Colonel	Locotenent-colonel	Maior	Căpitan	Locotenent	Sublocotenent
1912 (Note: Color for the infantry service branch and generals shown. Each service branch as well as the ten Roșiori regiments had distinct colors for the rank insignia.)
1912			General de corp de armată	General de divizie	General de brigadă	Colonel	Locotenent-colonel	Maior	Căpitan	Locotenent	Sublocotenent
1916
1916			General de corp de armată	General de divizie	General de brigadă	Colonel	Locotenent-colonel	Maior	Căpitan	Locotenent	Sublocotenent
1931
1931	Mareșal	General de armată	General de corp de armată	General de divizie	General de brigadă	Colonel	Locotenent-colonel	Maior	Căpitan	Locotenent	Sublocotenent
Rank group	General / flag officers					Senior officers			Junior officers

=== Other ranks ===
The rank insignia of non-commissioned officers and enlisted personnel.

Rank group	Senior NCOs				Junior NCOs		Enlisted
1846
1846			Feldfebel		Caporal-Subofițer	Subofițer	Caporal-efreitor	Soldat
1912
1912		Plutonier maior	Plutonier		Sergent	Caporal	Fruntaș	Soldat
1931
1931	Plutonier adjutant	Plutonier maior	Plutonier	Sergent maior	Sergent	Caporal	Fruntaș	Soldat

== Navy ==
=== Commissioned officer ranks ===
The rank insignia of commissioned officers.

Rank group	General / flag officers					Senior officers			Junior officers
	Mareșal	Amiral	Viceamiral	Contraamiral	Contraamiral de flotilă	Comandor	Căpitan-comandor	Locotenent-comandor	Căpitan	Locotenent	Aspirant

=== Other ranks ===
The rank insignia of non-commissioned officers and enlisted personnel.

Rank group	Senior NCOs			Junior NCOs		Enlisted
	Plutonier maior	Plutonier	Sergent maior	Sergent	Caporal	Marinar fruntaș	Marinar

== Air force ==
=== Commissioned officer ranks ===
The rank insignia of commissioned officers.

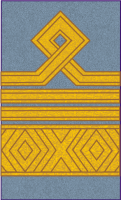
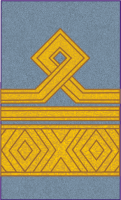
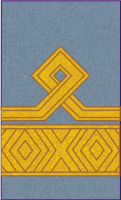
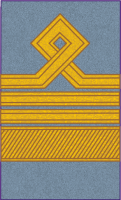
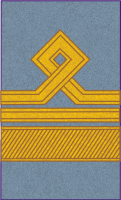
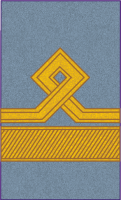
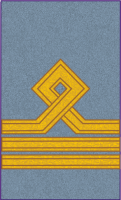
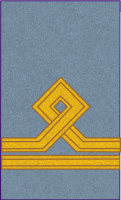
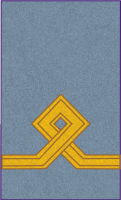
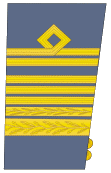
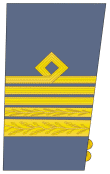
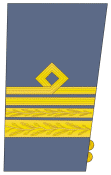
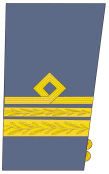
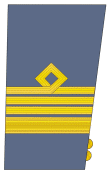
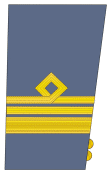
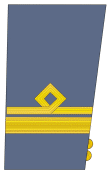
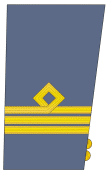
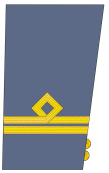
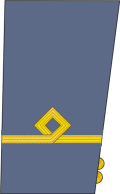
Rank group	General / flag officers				Senior officers			Junior officers
1931
1931		General inspector	General comandant	General de escadră aeriană	Comandor	Căpitan-comandor	Locotenent-comandor	Căpitan	Locotenent	Sublocotenent
Late World War 2
Late World War 2	Mareșal	General inspector	General comandant	General de escadră aeriană	Comandor	Căpitan-comandor	Locotenent-comandor	Căpitan	Locotenent	Sublocotenent
Rank group	General / flag officers				Senior officers			Junior officers

=== Other ranks ===
The rank insignia of non-commissioned officers and enlisted personnel.

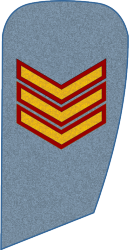
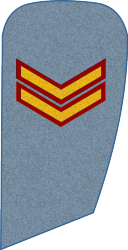
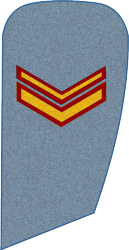
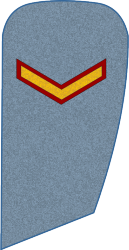
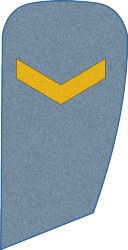
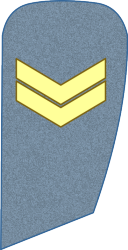
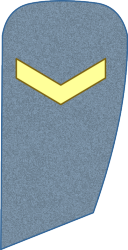
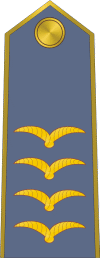
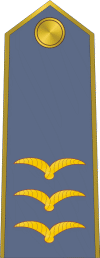
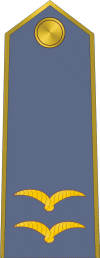
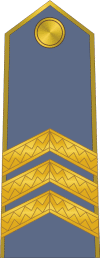
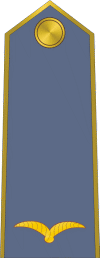
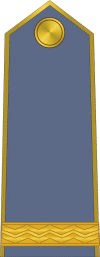
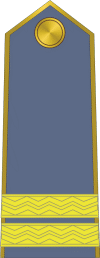
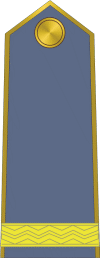
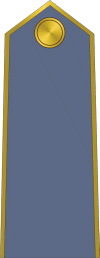
Rank group	Senior NCOs				Junior NCOs		Enlisted
1931
1931	Adjutant șef	Adjutant major	Adjutant	Adjutant stagiar	Sergent	Caporal	Fruntaș	Soldat
Late World War 2
Late World War 2	Adjutant șef	Adjutant major	Adjutant/(ground staff)	Adjutant stagiar	Sergent	Caporal	Fruntaș	Soldat
Rank group	Senior NCOs				Junior NCOs		Enlisted

== See also ==
- Military ranks of the Socialist Republic of Romania
- Romanian Armed Forces ranks and insignia
