= Politihjemmeværnet =

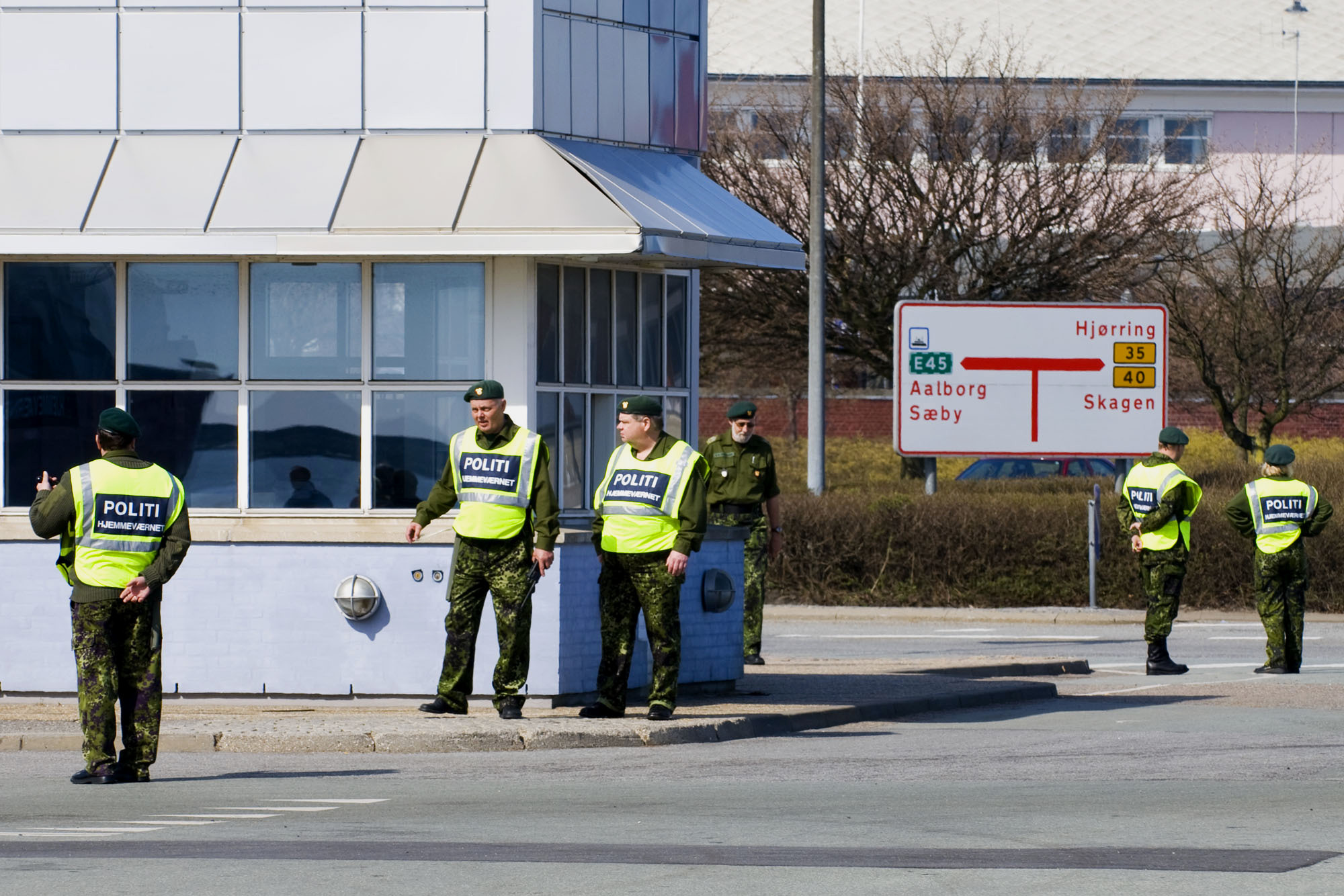
Police home guard performing traffic control duties

Politihjemmeværnet is a Danish Home Guard unit, which can support the Danish police in various tasks.

== Operation ==
The Danish police can call upon the assistance from a section of the Danish home guard; the police home guard. The police home guard consists of 47 companies, each led by professional police officers.

The volunteers are mainly used for traffic control at festivals, searches for victims and guarding community installations and are never used where there are risks of direct confrontation with civilians (riot control or planned arrests). The companies are part of the Army Home Guard.

They are dressed in the branch-common daily battle dress uniforms, green berets and bright yellow wests with the text "POLITI HJEMMEVÆRNET".

The police home guard can have slightly more legal authority than other citizens, when the service they provide calls for it, but are always under the supervision of the civilian police.
