= Military ranks of the Socialist Republic of Romania =

The Military ranks of the Socialist Republic of Romania are the military insignia used by the Army of the Socialist Republic of Romania. (Note: Army of the Romanian People's Republic (1948–1965)) The ranks replaced the Military ranks of the Kingdom of Romania in 1947, following the proclamation of the Republic. The ranks were replaced by the Romanian Armed Forces ranks and insignia, following the Romanian Revolution. Since Romania was a member of the Warsaw Pact, it shared a rank structure to the Soviet Union. However, after the Warsaw Pact invasion of Czechoslovakia, Romania gradually moved towards the pre-war ranks.

== Commissioned officer ranks ==
The rank insignia of commissioned officers.

Rank group	General / flag officers				Senior officers			Junior officers
Romanian Land Forces
Romanian Land Forces	General de armată	General colonel	General-locotenent	General-maior	Colonel	Locotenent-colonel	Maior	Căpitan	Locotenent maior	Locotenent	Sublocotenent
Romanian Naval Forces
Romanian Naval Forces		Amiral	Viceamiral	Contraamiral	Căpitan rangul I	Căpitan rangul II	Căpitan rangul III	Căpitan locotenent	Locotenent maior	Locotenent	Sublocotenent
Romanian Air Force
Romanian Air Force		General colonel	General-locotenent	General-maior	Colonel	Locotenent-colonel	Maior	Căpitan	Locotenent maior	Locotenent	Sublocotenent
Rank group	General / flag officers				Senior officers			Junior officers

== Other ranks ==
The rank insignia of non-commissioned officers and enlisted personnel.

Rank group	Senior NCOs					Junior NCOs		Enlisted
Romanian Land Forces
Romanian Land Forces	Plutonier adjutant	Plutonier-major	Plutonier	Sergent-major	Sergent	Caporal	Soldat fruntaș	Soldat
Romanian Naval Forces
Romanian Naval Forces	Plutonier adjutant	Plutonier-major	Plutonier	Sergent-major	Sergent	Caporal	Soldat fruntaș	Soldat
Romanian Air Force
Romanian Air Force	Plutonier adjutant	Plutonier-major	Plutonier	Sergent-major	Sergent	Caporal	Soldat fruntaș	Soldat
Rank group	Senior NCOs					Junior NCOs		Enlisted

== See also ==
- Military ranks of the Kingdom of Romania
- Romanian Armed Forces ranks and insignia
