= Britten-Norman Defender =

Military series of the BN-2 utility transport aircraft

Defender
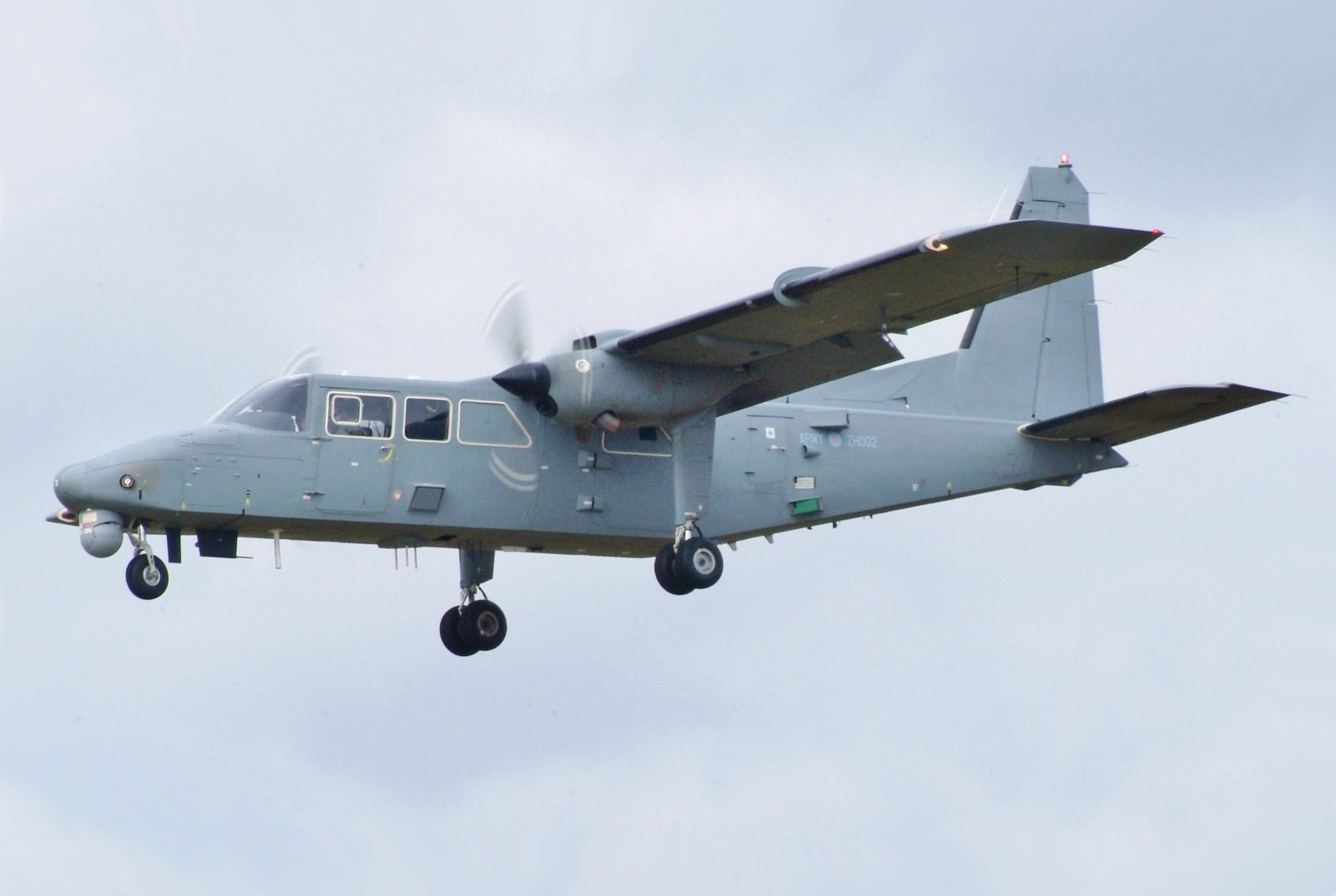
- Britten-Norman Defender AL2 of the British Army Air Corps

General information
- Type: Transport, patrol, reconnaissance
- National origin: United Kingdom
- Manufacturer: Britten-Norman
- Status: In service

History
- First flight: May 1970
- Developed from: Britten-Norman Islander

The Britten-Norman Defender is a multi-role utility transport aircraft, manufactured by Britten-Norman of the United Kingdom. It is the military version of the Britten-Norman Islander, developed for roles such as utility transport, casualty evacuation, counter-insurgency and light attack, forward air control, patrol and reconnaissance. The term 'Britten-Norman Defender' refers to all militarised variants of the BN-2 product line including the BN-2 Piston Defender, the BN-2T Turbine Defender (sometimes known as the Defender 2000), the BN-2T-4R Defender (also known as AEW Defender and highlighted by its large bulbous nose) and the stretched variant BN-2T-4S, designated Defender 4000 (sometimes known as D4K).

== Development ==
First flown in May 1970, the Defender was based on the civilian Islander, and has a larger airframe with four underwing hardpoints for pylons to attach 2,500 pounds (1,100 kg) of fuel tanks, bombs, missiles, 7.62-mm (0.3-inch) machine-gun pods, rocket pods, flares, sensors and other stores.

The BN-2B (piston version) and BN-2T (turbine version) are used in military, coastguard, and police operations in several countries.

=== Defender 4000 ===
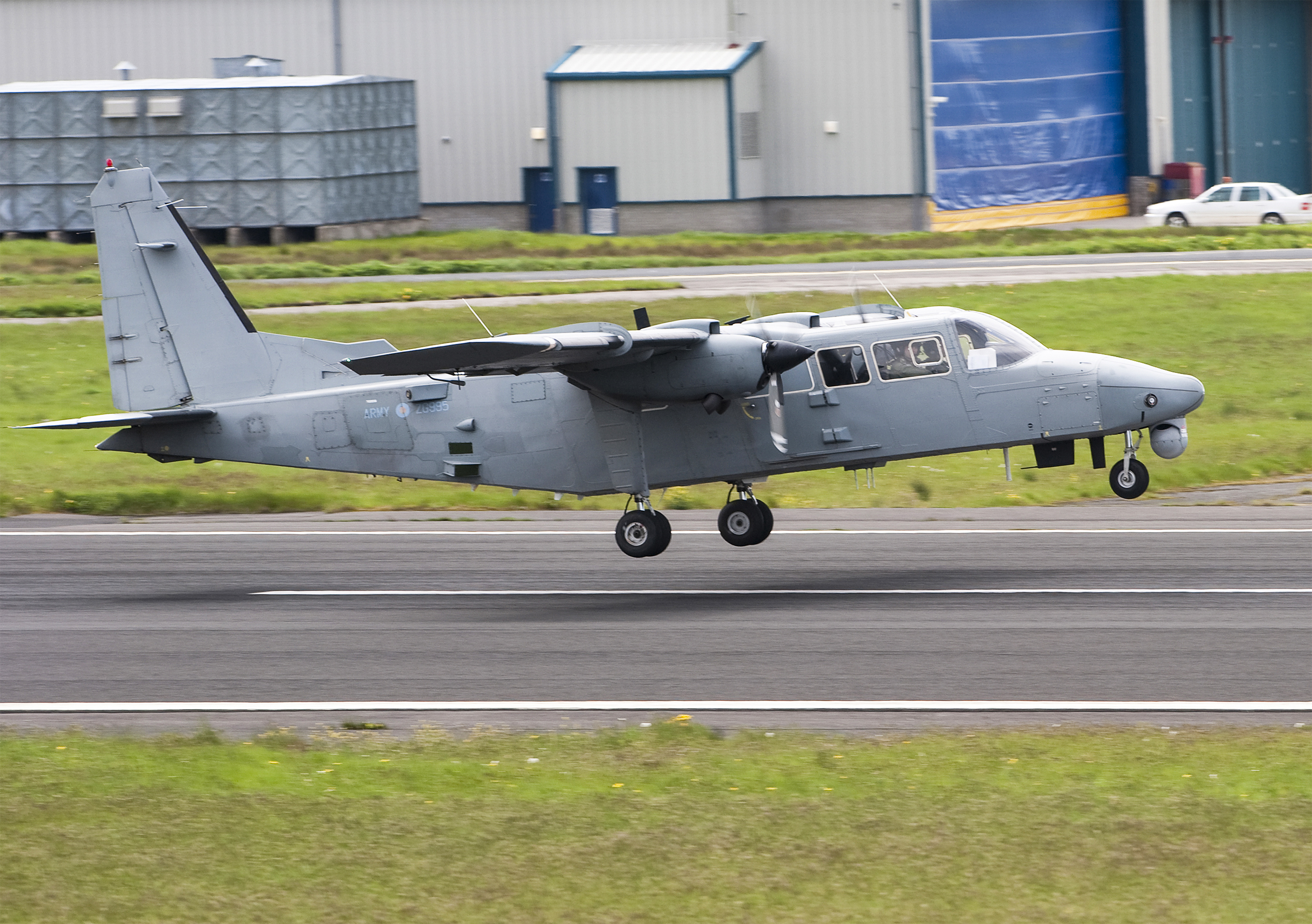
BN-2T-4S Defender 4000 of 5 Regiment Army Air Corps in 2013

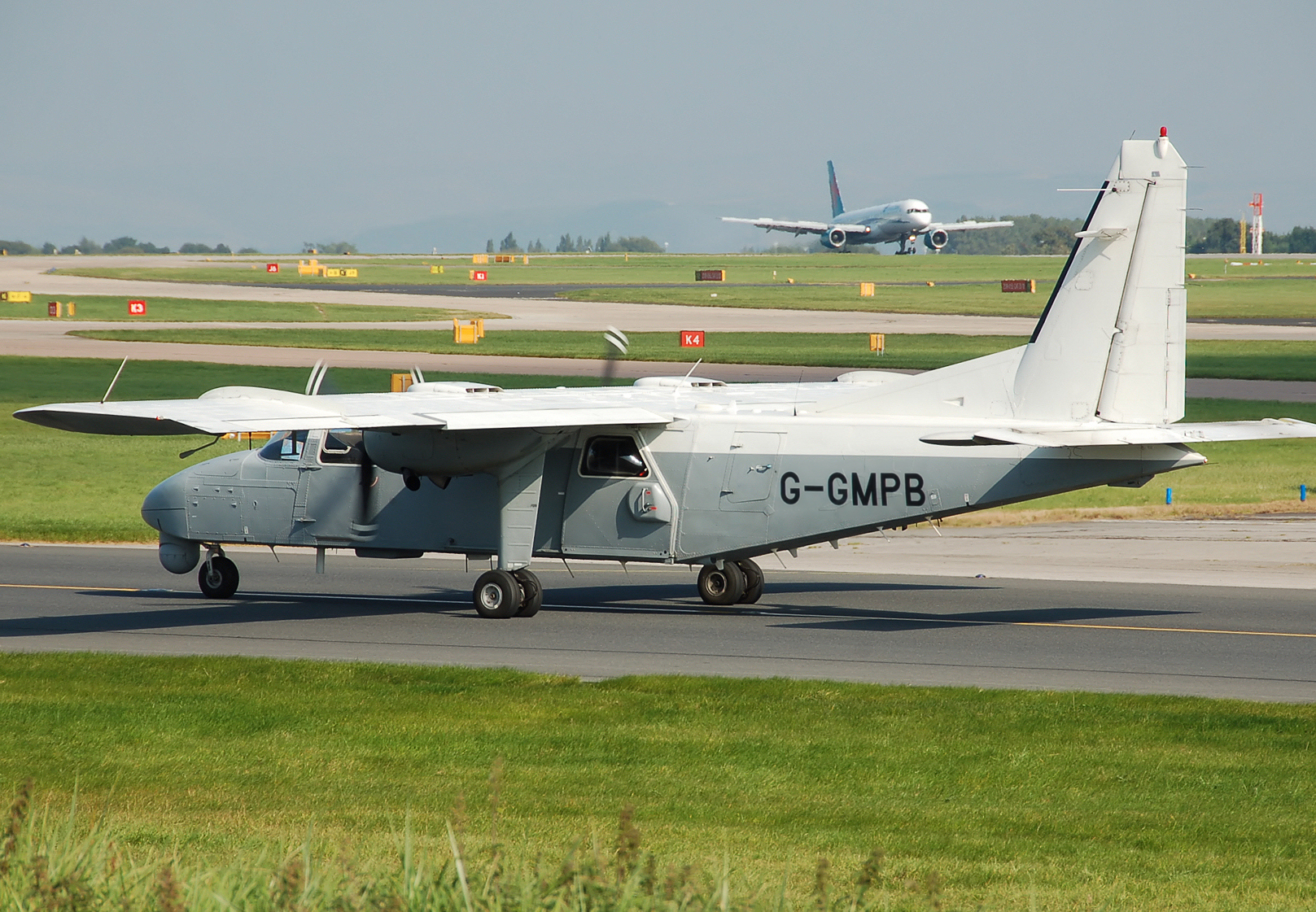
BN-2T-4S Defender 4000 of the Greater Manchester Police

The BN-2T-4S Defender 4000 is an enhanced version of the BN-2T Defender intended for the aerial surveillance role. Compared to earlier Defenders, it has a stretched fuselage, the enlarged wing from the Trislander, a new nose structure capable of accommodating an EO/IR sensor and radar, and an increased payload. The prototype Defender 4000 first flew in 1995 and entered production in 1997.

== Operational history ==
=== Law enforcement use ===
The FBI deployed one Defender for electronic aerial surveillance on the Branch Davidians' compound during the siege of Waco in 1993.

In August 2017, in an attempt to calm a gang war in Copenhagen, the Danish police force used at least one of the Danish National Guard's two Defenders to fly reconnaissance missions over the city.

=== Military use ===
The Mauritanian Air Force employed six BN-2A-21 Defenders in the Western Sahara War against POLISARIO forces in 1976, losing two of them in action.

A Rhodesian Air Force Alouette III, configured as a gunship or 'K-Car' (20mm cannon), shot down a Botswana Defence Force Air Wing Islander on 9 August 1979.

In 1996, the Royal Cambodian Air Force deployed its three BN-2 Defenders in support of the dry season offensive against Khmer Rouge insurgents. The Defenders were armed with machine guns and rockets, and even dropped mortar rounds. One Defender was lost during the operation.

In 2014 the Philippine Navy sent one of its Defenders to assist a multinational search and rescue party led by the government of Malaysia in search of the missing Malaysia Airlines Flight 370.

==== United Kingdom ====
In January 2004, the British Army placed an urgent order for four BN-2T-4S Defender 4000 aircraft designated the AL Mk 1 for ISTAR missions in Iraq. The Defender was to be configured similar to the Army Islander AL Mk 1 and Defenders in use with Hampshire Constabulary and Greater Manchester Police. In October 2004, the first aircraft was delivered to No. 1 Flight AAC and deployed to Iraq that month. The final Mk 1 was delivered in September 2006 to No. 651 Squadron AAC which had been reformed to operate the Defender. The Mk 1 was fitted with a Wescam MX-15 Electro-Optical Infrared (EO/IR) turret under the nose, cabin-mounted cameras, COMINT and C2 equipment. During the fleet's bi-annual return to the UK for in-depth servicing new ISTAR equipment was fitted.

A second order was placed for four fully re-designed aircraft designated the Mk 2 and a trainer. In September 2008, the first Mk 2 aircraft and one Mk 1 upgraded to Mk 2 standard were delivered. The Mk 2 was fitted with TCAS, EGPWS, improved DAS, an improved avionics suite and ISTAR equipment enhancements. The Mk 2 had a longer endurance than the Mk 1, being able to carry more fuel and also being able to operate at a lower height. The training variant was also delivered in September 2008 designated the T Mk 3. The final Mk 2 aircraft was to be delivered by 2012 along with the three Mk 1s upgraded to Mk 2 standard.

In June 2009, the Defender's deployment to Iraq ended with 651 Squadron serving continuously since October 2004 during which time it had provided over 8,000 hours in support of UK Forces. From January to February 2010, the Defender was trialled in the Middle East with a Counter-IED capability for potential use in Afghanistan. Defenders deployed to Afghanistan from November 2010 through to 2012. In 2012, Defenders flew daily missions prior to and during the London 2012 Summer Olympics.

In April 2019, the Defender was transferred from the Army to the Royal Air Force with No. 1 Group. The aircraft was re-designated from AL2 (prefix AL for Army liaison) to R2 (prefix R for Reconnaissance).

In July 2021, it was reported that the Defender was retired from service on 30 June 2021 and that Britten-Norman had acquired the fleet and working with the Defence Equipment Sales Authority will convert the aircraft for civilian sale.

== Variants ==
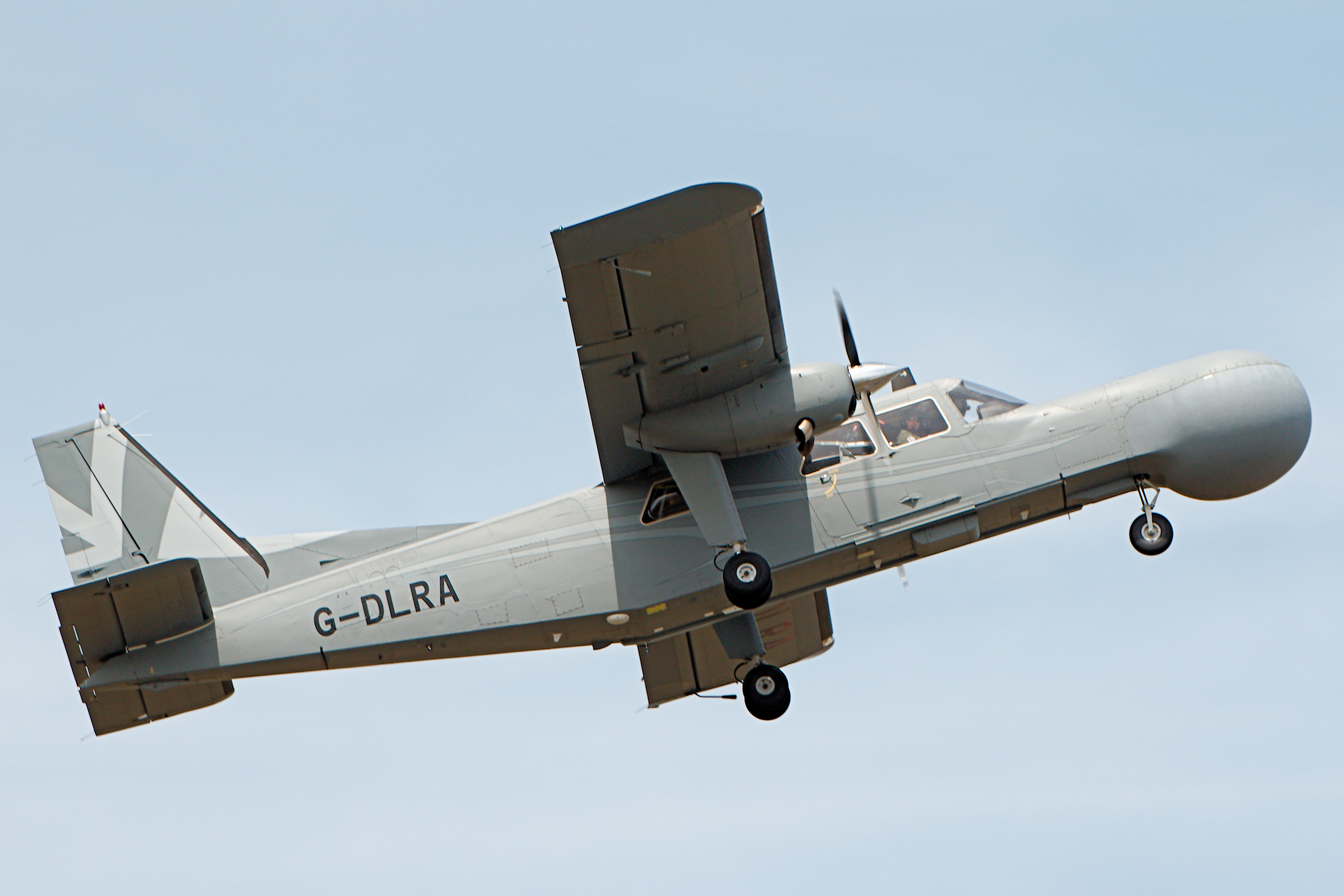
AEW Defender in flight

Defender
Multi-role utility transport aircraft.
Maritime Defender
Armed maritime patrol and reconnaissance aircraft.
Defender 4000
Enhanced Defender for the urban surveillance, counter-terrorism and maritime surveillance roles.
AEW Defender
Airborne Early Warning aircraft

== Operators ==
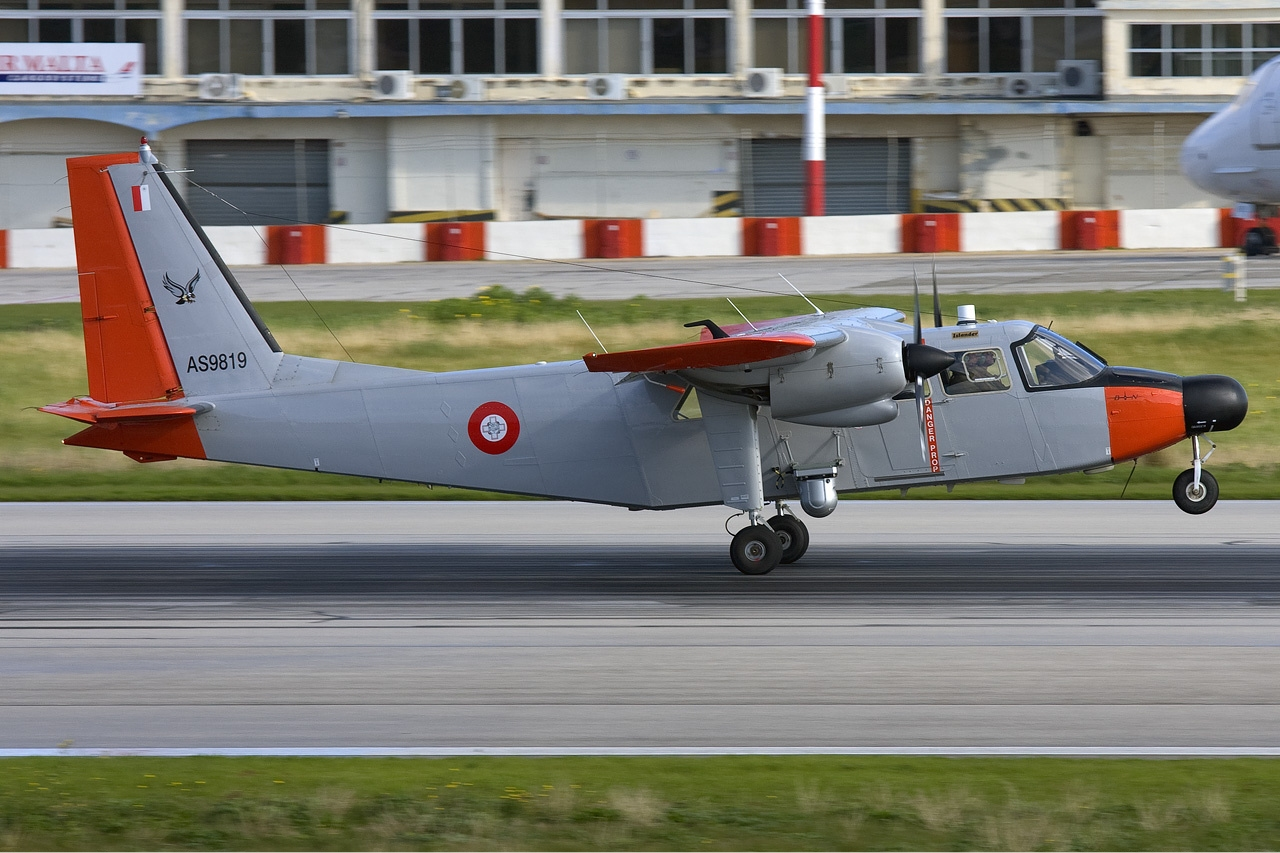
Maltese Air Force Defender

Belize

- Belize Defence Force Air Wing 1 x BN-2B

Denmark

- Air Force Home Guard – 2 x BN-2A-26

Malta

- Armed Forces of Malta 2 x BN-2T

Mauritius

- National Coast Guard – 1 x BN-2T

Morocco

- Royal Moroccan Gendarmerie 13 x BN-2T

Philippines

- Philippine Navy 5 x BN-2

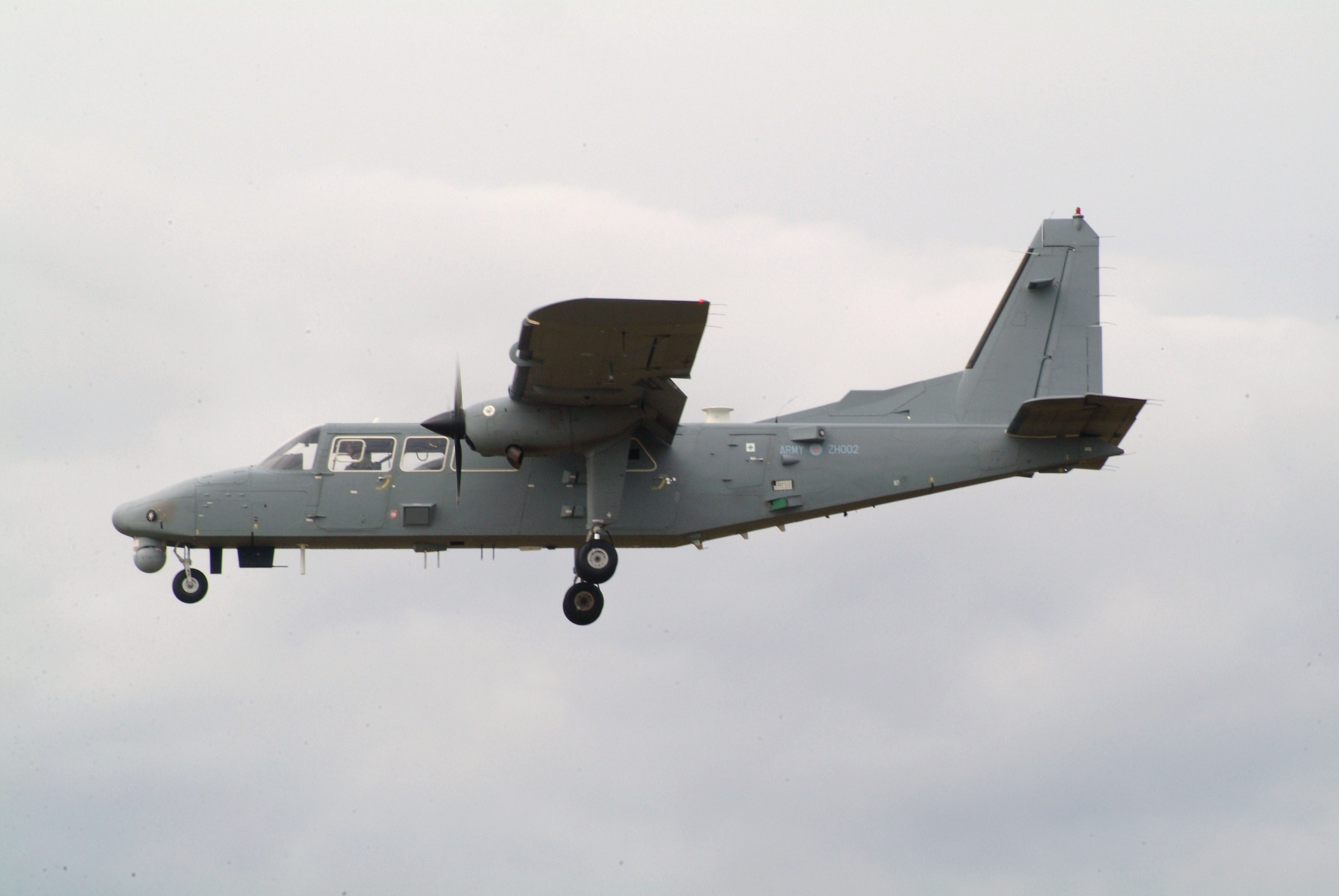
Defender AL2 of 651 Squadron of the Army Air Corps

Pakistan

- Pakistan Maritime Security Agency 3 x BN-2T

United Kingdom

- Police Service of Northern Ireland – 1 × Defender 4000

== Former operators ==
Ireland

- Garda Air Support Unit (operated by Irish Air Corps) – 1 × Defender 4000 1997-2023.

United Kingdom

- Royal Air Force – 8 x R2, 1 x T3 (transferred in 2019 from Army Army Air Corps)
- Army Air Corps - retired in 2021

== Specifications (Defender 4000) ==
Data from Jane's All The World's Aircraft 2003–2004, Britten-Norman

General characteristics

- Crew: 2 (flight crew)
- Capacity: Up to 16 troops in transport role
- Length: 12.20 m (40 ft 0 in)
- Wingspan: 16.15 m (53 ft 0 in)
- Height: 4.4 m (14 ft 5 in)
- Wing area: 32.6 m^{2} (351 sq ft)
- Aspect ratio: 8.0:1
- Airfoil: NACA 23012
- Empty weight: 2,223 kg (4,900 lb) (empty equipped)
- Max takeoff weight: 3,856 kg (8,500 lb)
- Fuel capacity: 1,131 L (299 US gal; 249 imp gal)
- Powerplant: 2 × Rolls-Royce 250 B17F turboprops, 300 kW (400 shp) each

Performance

- Maximum speed: 326 km/h (203 mph, 176 kn) (Max cruise, at 3050 m (10000 ft))
- Cruise speed: 280 km/h (170 mph, 150 kn) (72% power, at 1525 m (5000 ft))
- Stall speed: 87 km/h (54 mph, 47 kn) (flaps down)
- Range: 1,863 km (1,158 mi, 1,006 nmi) (VFR reserves)
- Endurance: 8 hr 30 minutes
- Service ceiling: 7,600 m (25,000 ft) (absolute ceiling)
- Rate of climb: 6.4 m/s (1,250 ft/min)
- Take-off run to 15 m (50 ft): 565 m (1,854 ft)
- Landing run from 15 m (50 ft): 589 m (1,932 ft)

== See also ==
Related development

- Britten-Norman Islander
- Britten-Norman Trislander
