= Romanian Armed Forces ranks and insignia =

The Military ranks of Romania are the military insignia used by the Romanian Armed Forces.

== Branch colors in the Romanian Armed Forces ==
The colors depend on the service branch (armă, literally "weapon") the bearer is a member of. They show on the shoulder slides which hold the rank insignia, on the band of combination caps, and on collar insignia. Because many different branches share a color (for example black or light blue), each branch has distinctive branch insignia (semne de armă), which is worn next to the rank insignia on the shoulder slides. Other militarized institutions, such as the Romanian Gendarmerie and the Military Firefighters Corps, also have branch insignia worn in the same way.

Service branch	Colour
Marshals (all branches); Land Forces Generals (except Military Medicine and Military Justice); Infantry; Military Music	Red
Air force (all staff); Paratroopers; Radar Troops	Light blue
Naval forces (all staff); Artillery; Tanks; Military Automobile Troops; Anti-air Artillery and Missiles; Communication and Informatics structures Engineers Troops; NBC defence	Black
Military Medicine (incl. Generals)	Burgundy red
Mountain Troops	Green
Military Logistics; Administration	Violet
Military Justice (incl. Generals)	Dark Blue/Dark Violet
Military Police	Gray

The same ranks and basic insignia are used in the other militarised institutions. They differ in the color and branch insignia on the shoulder boards.

- Gendarmerie
- Firefighters
- General Inspectorate of Aviation
- Intelligence Service
- Foreign Intelligence Service
- Protection and Guard Service
- Special Telecommunications Service

== Armed forces ==
The rank insignia is worn on the shoulder of the jacket, cloak/coat, overcoat, and shirt. The ranks are displayed with braids (called galoane or trese) of gold color for the commissioned officers and silver for senior non-commissioned and warrant officers. The junior NCOs, enlisted and the navy warrant officers use yellow silk braids. Generals use star insignia. The navy warrant officers use yellow colored star insignia as well. The air force and navy officers also display the ranks on the sleeves. The topmost braids for the air force officer ranks are folded in the shape of a rhombus; for the navy, the braids are in the form of the executive curl; for the parachute units, the braids are folded in the shape of an open parachute.

=== Commissioned officer ranks ===
The rank insignia of commissioned officers.

NATO code	OF-10	OF-9	OF-8	OF-7	OF-6	OF-5	OF-4	OF-3	OF-2	OF-1
Romanian Land Forces
Romanian Land Forces	Mareșal	General	General-locotenent	General-maior	General de brigadă	Colonel	Locotenent-colonel	Maior	Căpitan	Locotenent	Sublocotenent
Romanian Land Forces (Paratroopers)
Romanian Land Forces (Paratroopers)						Colonel	Locotenent-colonel	Maior	Căpitan	Locotenent	Sublocotenent
Romanian Naval Forces
Romanian Naval Forces	Mareșal	Amiral	Viceamiral	Contraamiral	Contraamiral de flotilă	Comandor	Căpitan-comandor	Locotenent-comandor	Căpitan	Locotenent	Aspirant
Romanian Air Force
Romanian Air Force	Mareșal	General	General-locotenent	General-maior	General de flotilă aeriană	Comandor	Căpitan-comandor	Locotenent-comandor	Căpitan	Locotenent	Sublocotenent
NATO code	OF-10	OF-9	OF-8	OF-7	OF-6	OF-5	OF-4	OF-3	OF-2	OF-1

=== Warrant officers ranks ===
NATO rank	OR-9		OR-8	OR-7	OR-6	OR-5
Romanian Land Forces
Romanian Land Forces	Maistru militar principal	Maistru militar clasa I	Maistru militar clasa II	Maistru militar clasa III	Maistru militar clasa IV	Maistru militar clasa V
Romanian Naval Forces
Romanian Naval Forces	Maistru militar principal	Maistru militar clasa I	Maistru militar clasa II	Maistru militar clasa III	Maistru militar clasa IV	Maistru militar clasa V
Romanian Air Force
Romanian Air Force	Maistru militar principal	Maistru militar clasa I	Maistru militar clasa II	Maistru militar clasa III	Maistru militar clasa IV	Maistru militar clasa V
NATO rank	OR-9		OR-8	OR-7	OR-6	OR-5

=== Enlisted/Non-commissioned officers ranks ===
The rank insignia of non-commissioned officers and enlisted personnel.

NATO code	OR-9		OR-8	OR-7	OR-6	OR-5	OR-4			OR-3	OR-2	OR-1
Romanian Land Forces
Romanian Land Forces	Plutonier adjutant principal	Plutonier adjutant	Plutonier-major	Plutonier	Sergent-major	Sergent	Caporal clasa I	Caporal clasa a II-a	Caporal clasa a III-a	Fruntaș	Soldat
Romanian Naval Forces											No insignia
Romanian Naval Forces	Plutonier adjutant principal	Plutonier adjutant	Plutonier-major	Plutonier	Sergent-major	Sergent	Caporal clasa I	Caporal clasa a II-a	Caporal clasa a III-a	Fruntaș	Soldat
Romanian Air Force
Romanian Air Force	Plutonier adjutant principal	Plutonier adjutant	Plutonier-major	Plutonier	Sergent-major	Sergent	Caporal clasa I	Caporal clasa a II-a	Caporal clasa a III-a	Fruntaș	Soldat
NATO code	OR-9		OR-8	OR-7	OR-6	OR-5	OR-4			OR-3	OR-2	OR-1

== Gendarmerie ==
Unlike the Romanian Police, the Gendarmerie is a military force, and uses the same ranking system as the Romanian Land Forces.

=== Commissioned officer ranks ===
The rank insignia of commissioned officers.

NATO code	OF-10	OF-9	OF-8	OF-7	OF-6	OF-5	OF-4	OF-3	OF-2	OF-1
(Romania) Romanian Gendarmerie
(Romania) Romanian Gendarmerie	Mareșal	General	General-locotenent	General-maior	General de brigadă	Colonel	Locotenent-colonel	Maior	Căpitan	Locotenent	Sublocotenent

=== Warrant officers ranks ===
NATO rank	OR-9		OR-8	OR-7	OR-6	OR-5
(Romania) Romanian Gendarmerie
(Romania) Romanian Gendarmerie	Maistru militar principal	Maistru militar clasa I	Maistru militar clasa II	Maistru militar clasa III	Maistru militar clasa IV

=== Other ranks ===
The rank insignia of non-commissioned officers and enlisted personnel.

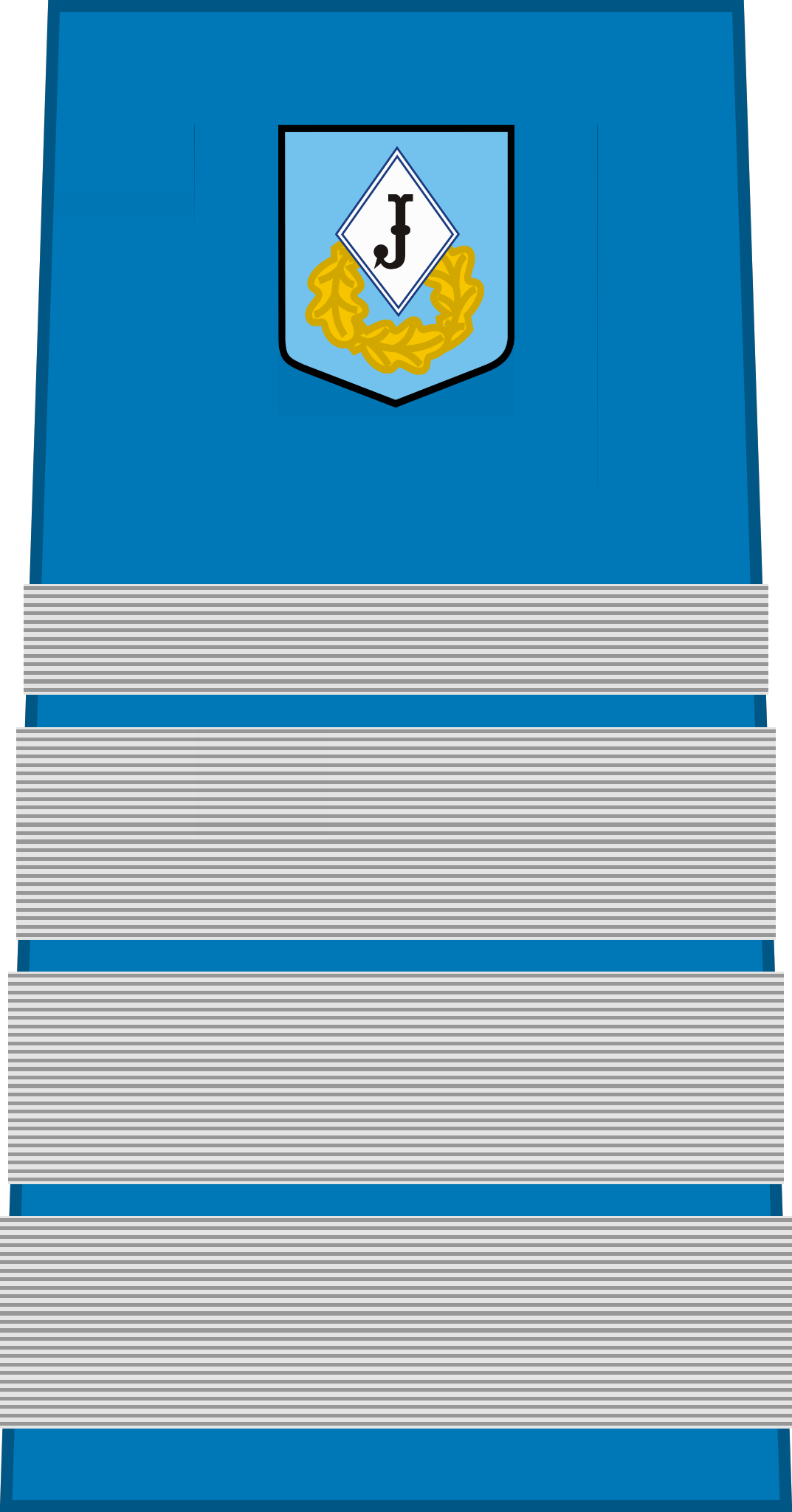
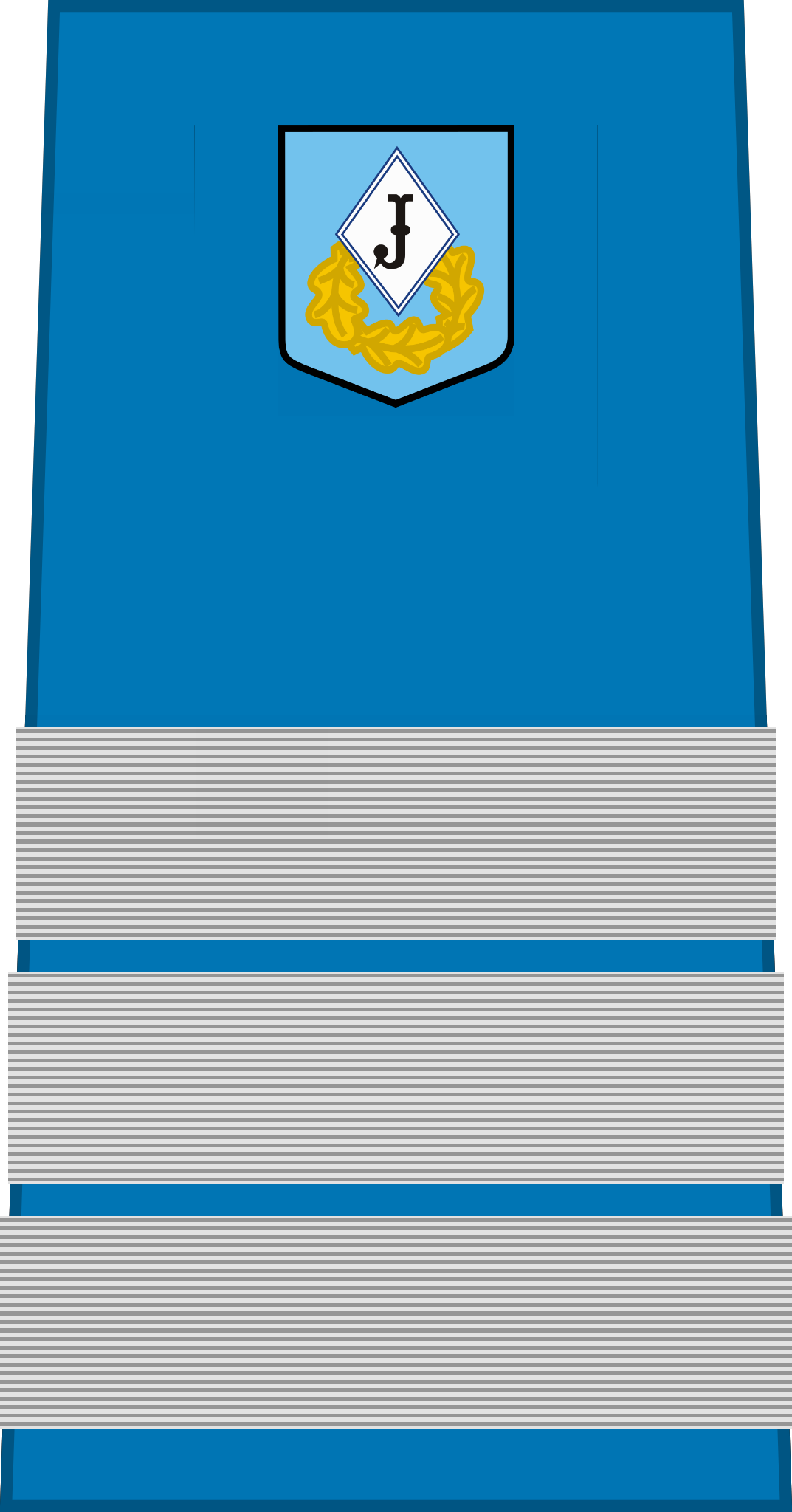
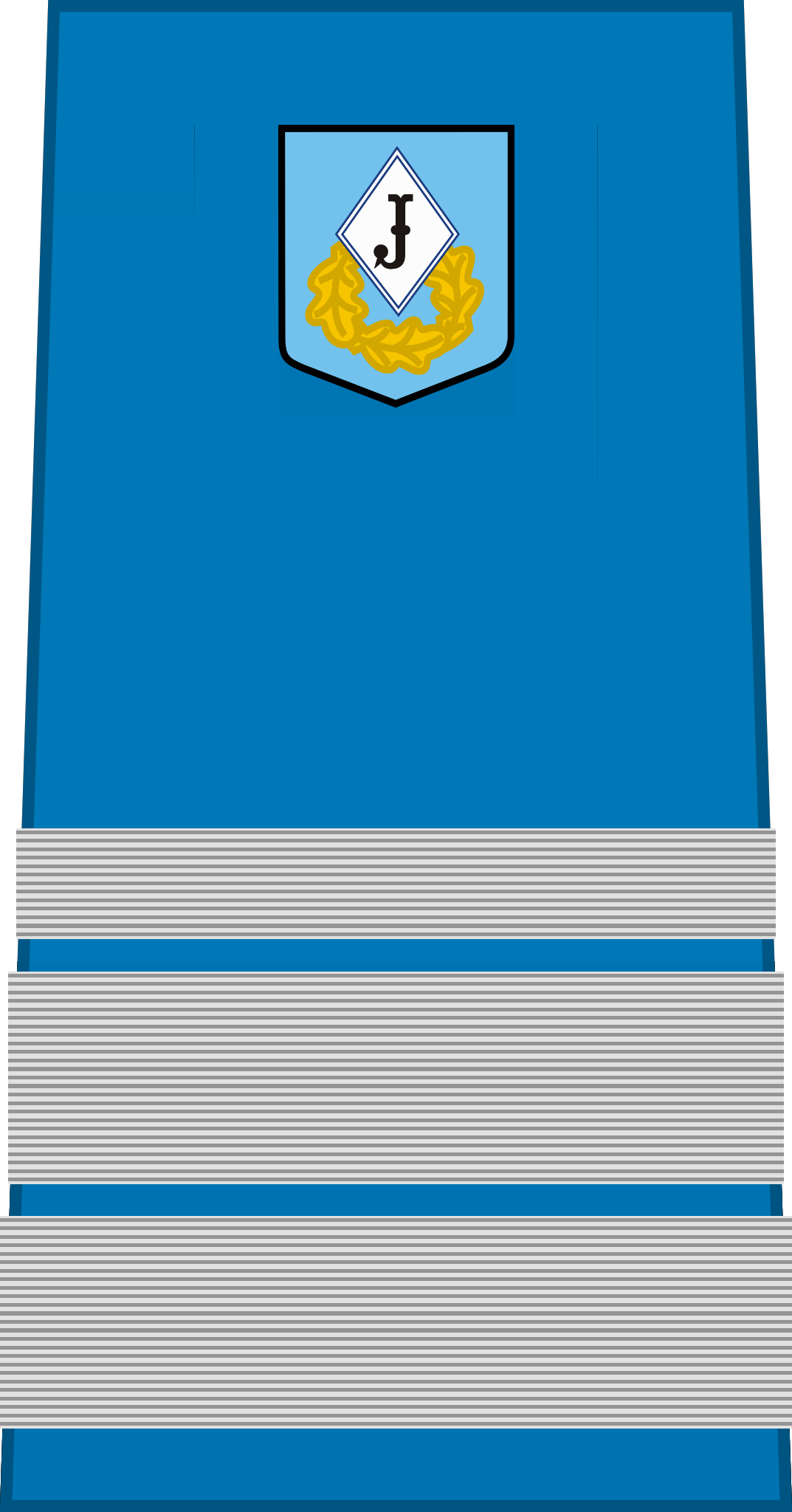
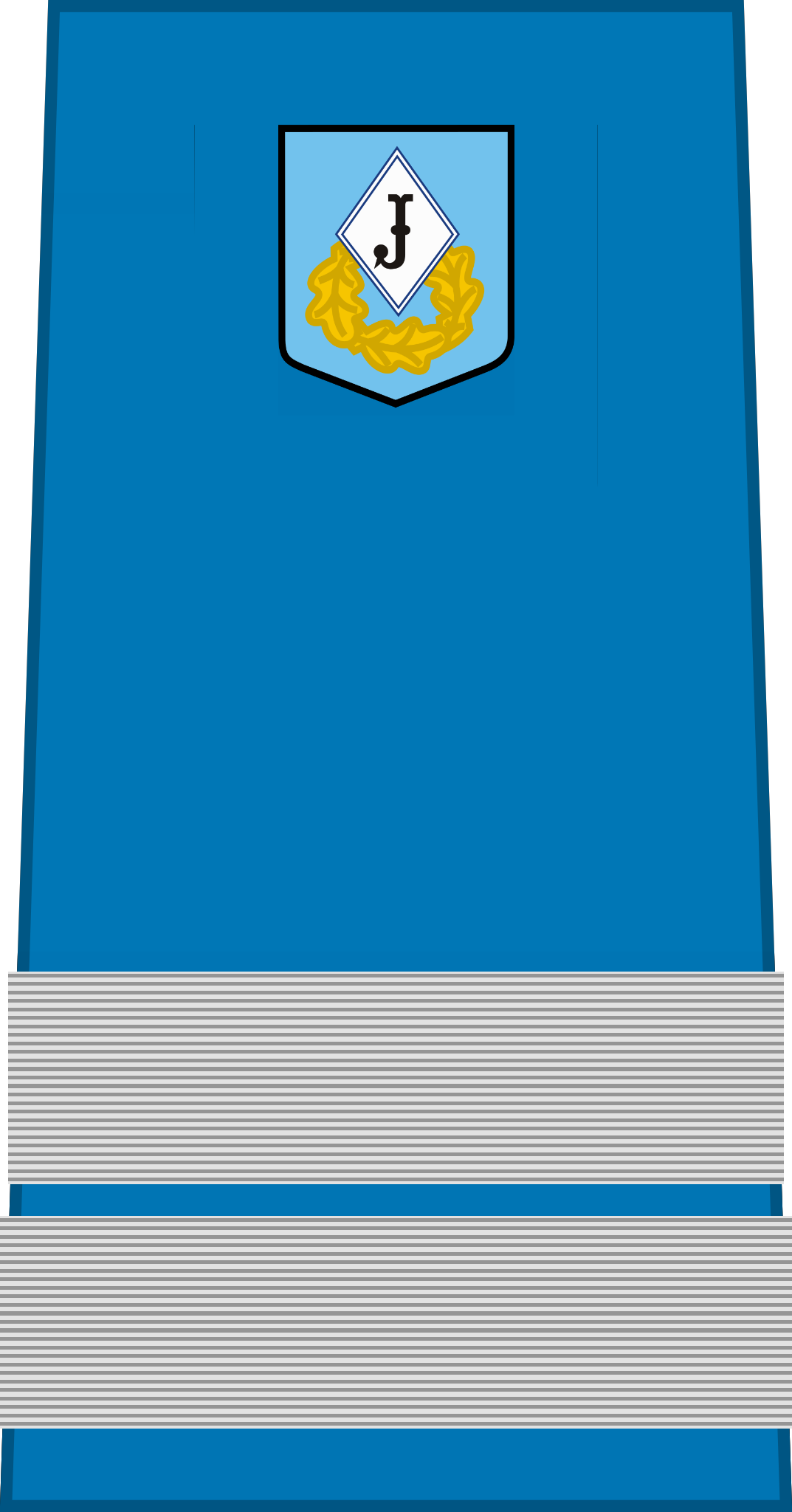
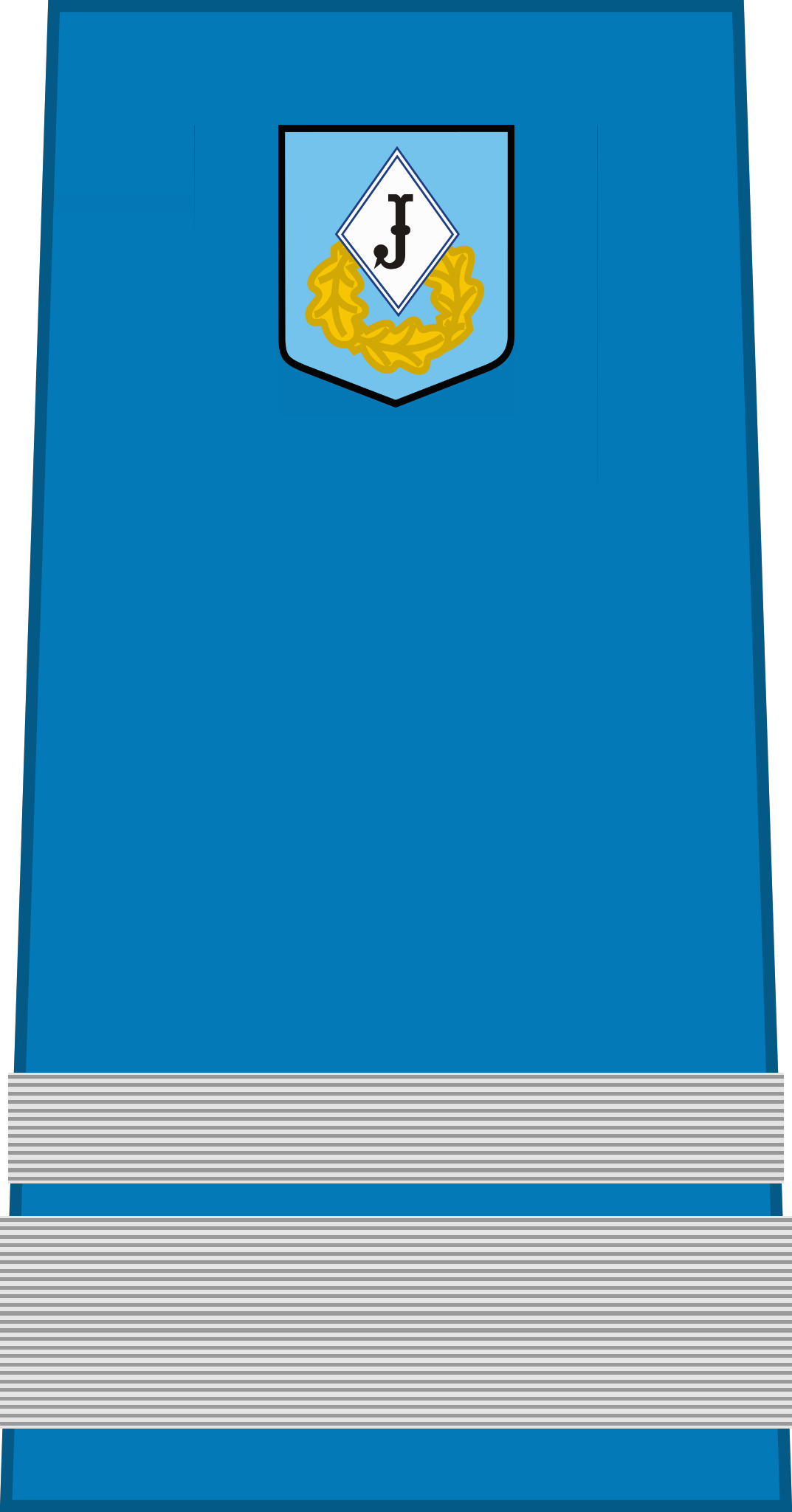
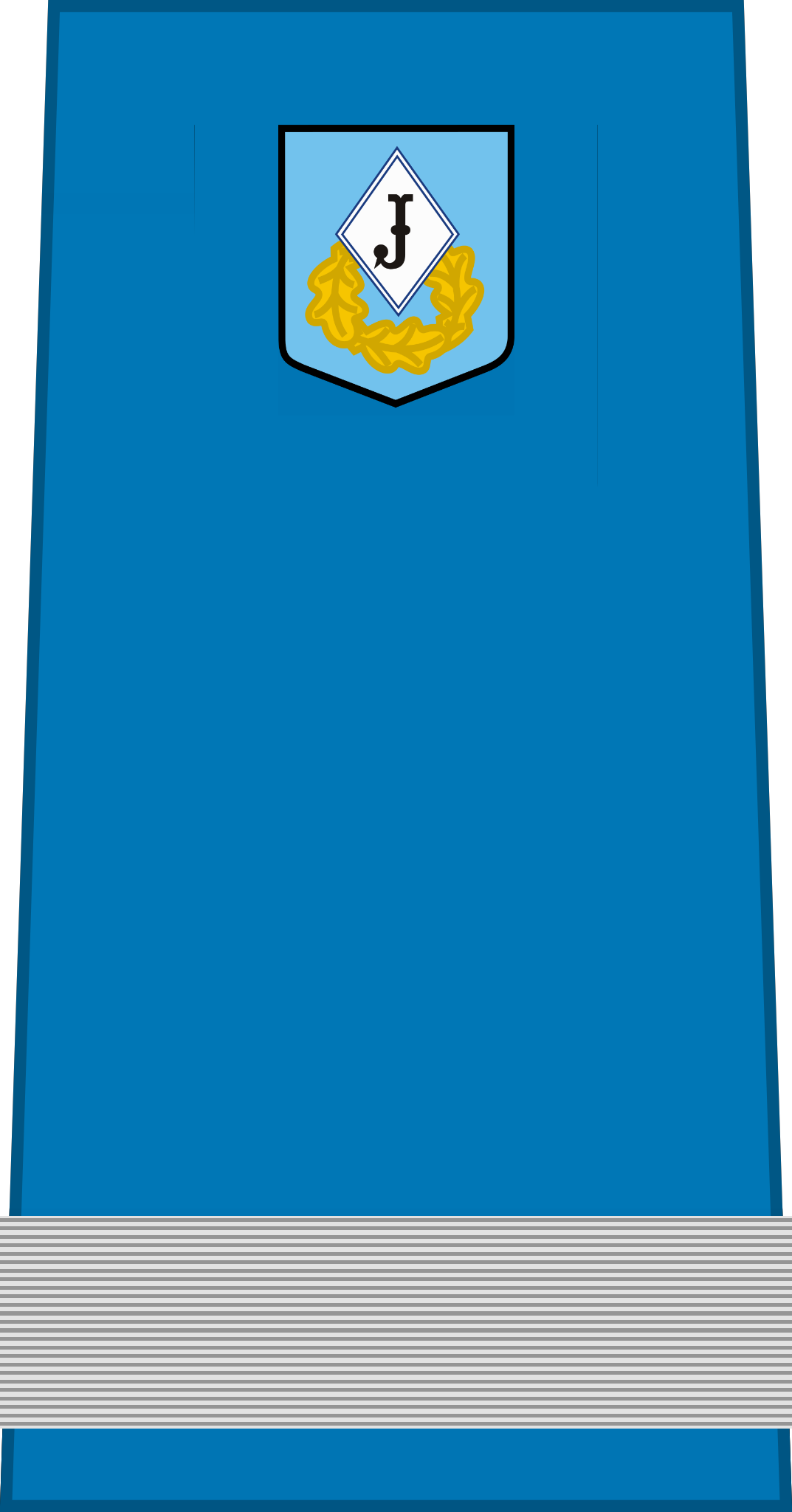
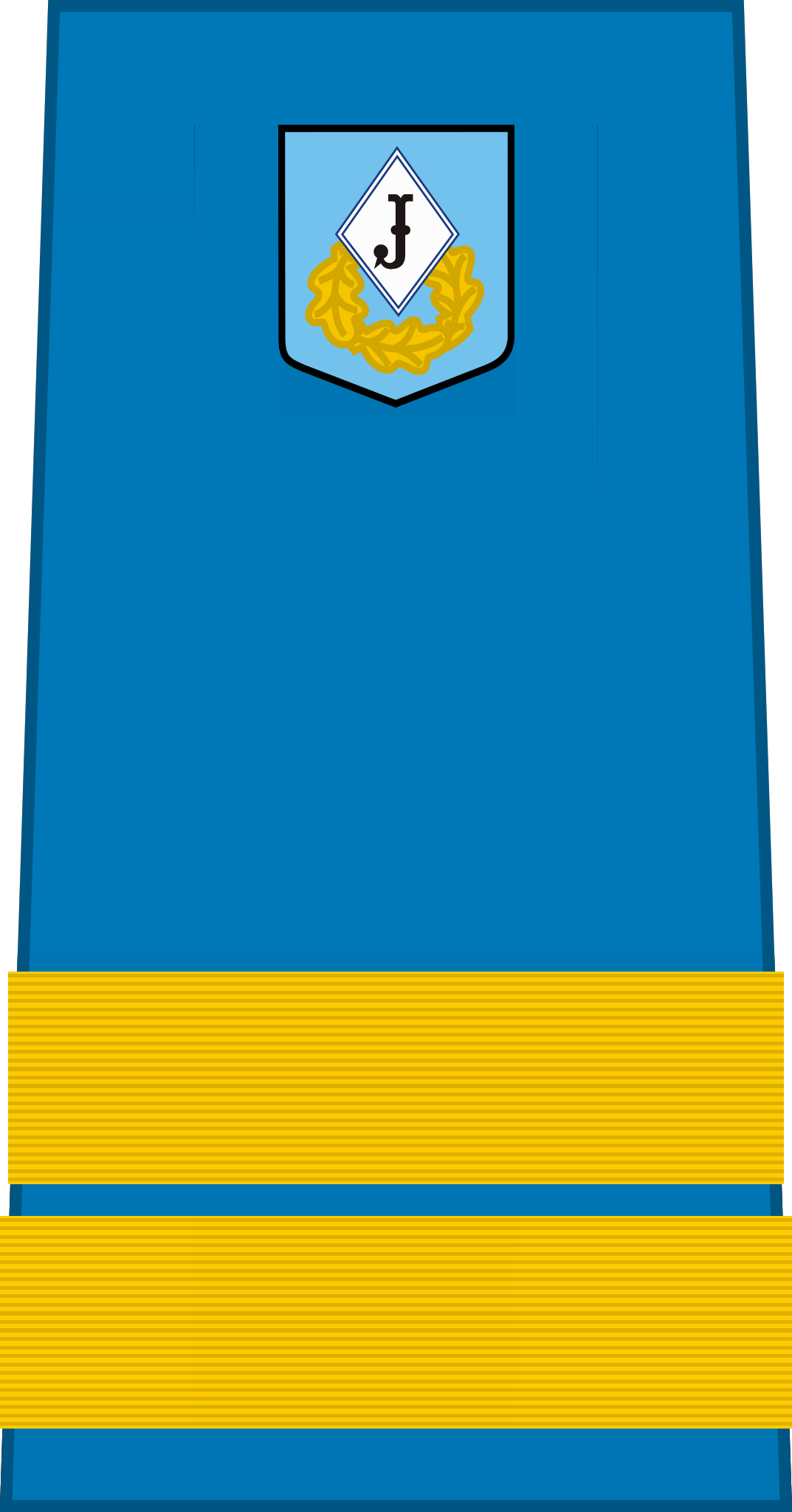
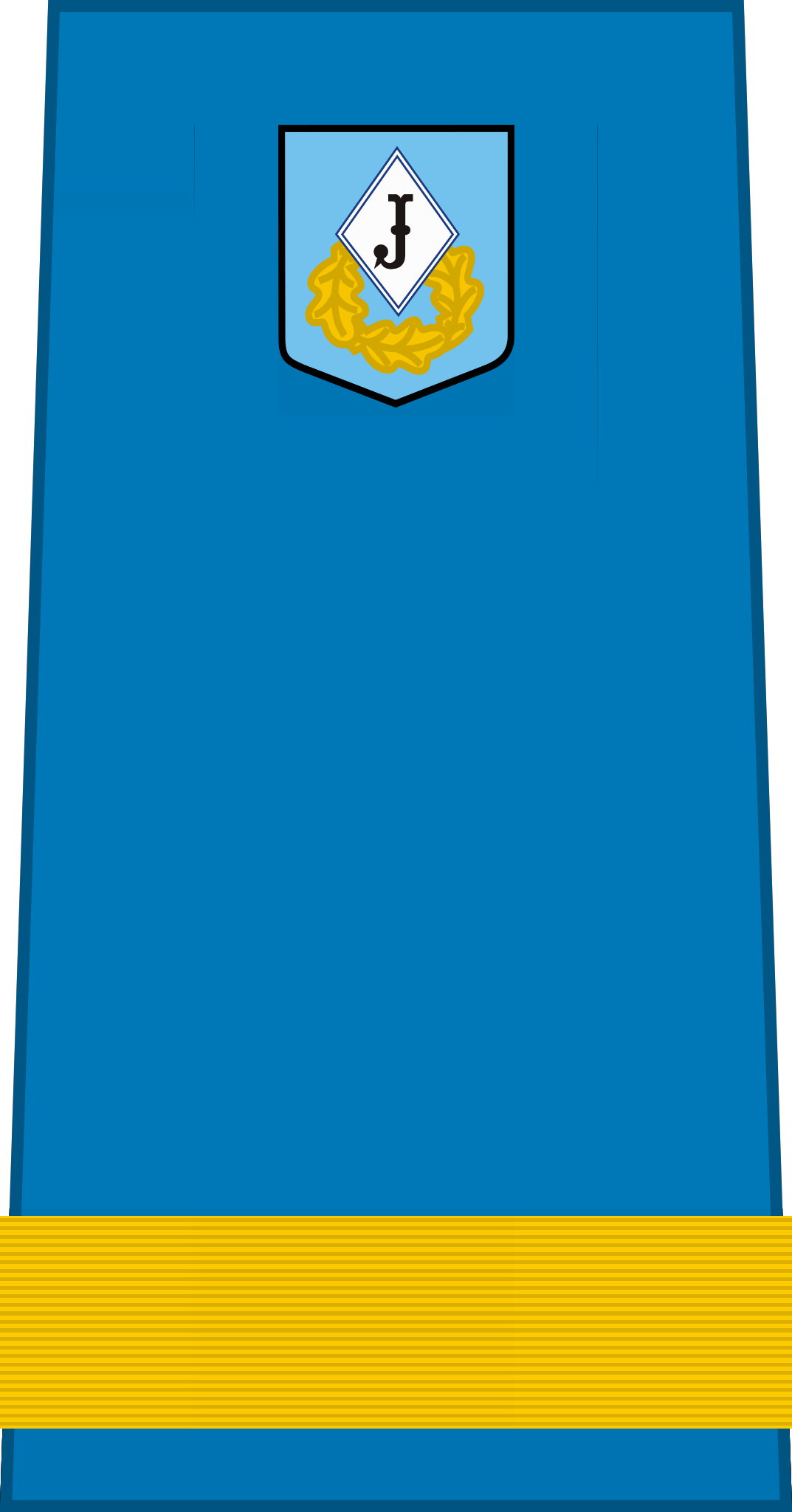
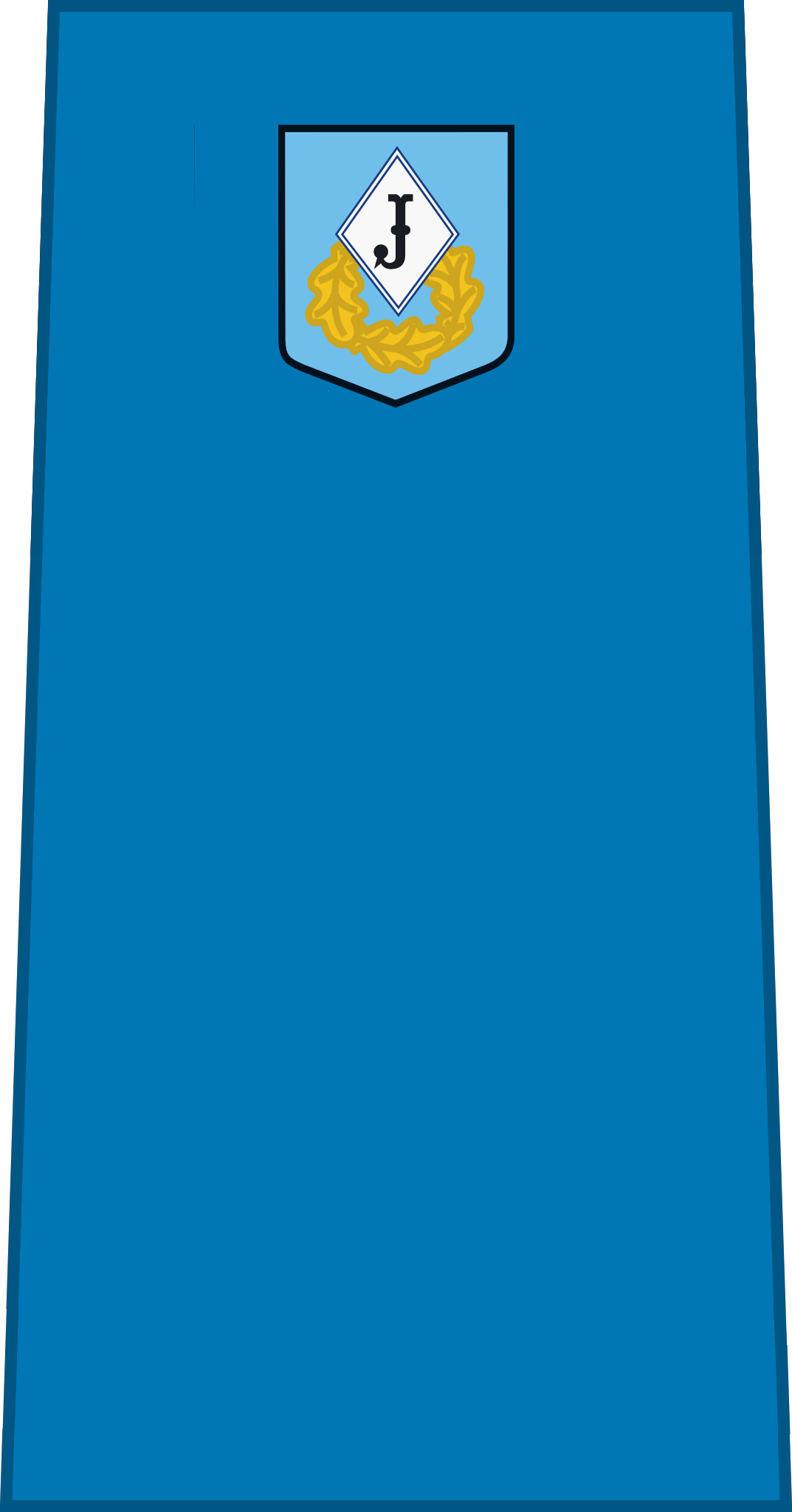
NATO code	OR-9		OR-8	OR-7	OR-6	OR-5	OR-4	OR-3	OR-2	OR-1
(Romania) Romanian Gendarmerie
(Romania) Romanian Gendarmerie	Plutonier adjutant șef	Plutonier adjutant	Plutonier-major	Plutonier	Sergent-major	Sergent	Caporal	Fruntaș	Jandarm

== Military firefighters corps ==
=== Commissioned officer ranks ===
The rank insignia of commissioned officers.

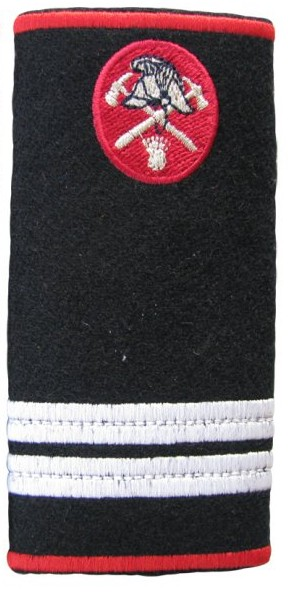
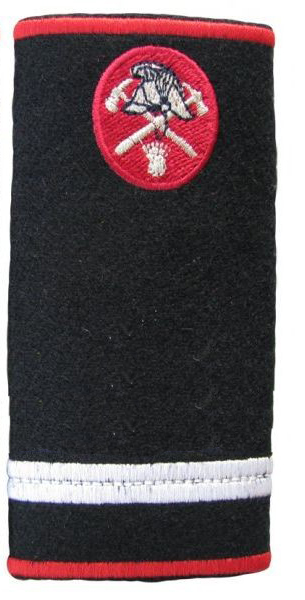
NATO code	OF-10	OF-9	OF-8	OF-7	OF-6	OF-5	OF-4	OF-3	OF-2	OF-1
(Romania) Romanian Military Firefighters Corps
(Romania) Romanian Military Firefighters Corps	Mareșal	General	General-locotenent	General-maior	General de brigadă	Colonel	Locotenent-colonel	Maior	Căpitan	Locotenent	Sublocotenent

=== Other ranks ===
The rank insignia of non-commissioned officers and enlisted personnel.

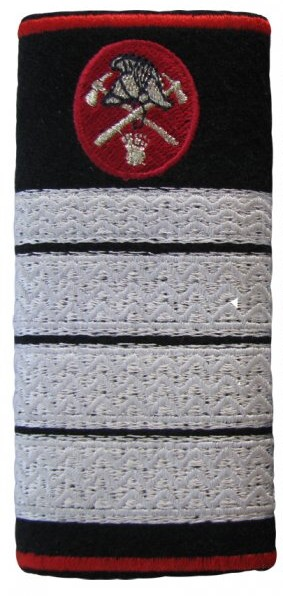
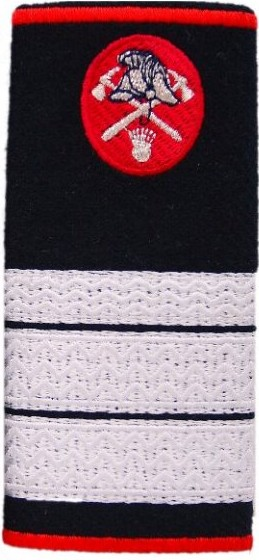
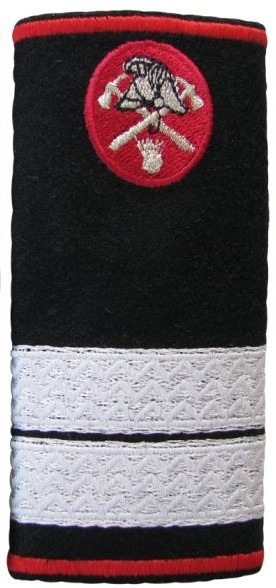
NATO code	OR-9		OR-8	OR-7	OR-6	OR-5	OR-4	OR-3	OR-2	OR-1
(Romania) Romanian Military Firefighters Corps
(Romania) Romanian Military Firefighters Corps	Plutonier adjutant șef	Plutonier adjutant	Plutonier-major	Plutonier	Sergent-major	Sergent

== See also ==
- Military ranks of the Kingdom of Romania
- Military ranks of the Socialist Republic of Romania
