= Islamic Revolutionary Guard Corps branch insignia =

Iranian military emblems

Seal of the Army of the Guardians of the Islamic Revolution

Branch insignia of the Islamic Revolutionary Guard Corps (IRGC) refers to military emblems that may be worn on the uniform of the Iranian Guard Corps to denote membership in a particular area of expertise and series of functional areas.

== General branches ==
Branch Insignia	Branch Description	Branch Insignia	Branch Description	Branch Insignia	Branch Description	Branch Insignia	Branch Description
	General and Staff		Information Technology		Infantry		Flight Protection
	Technical and Engineering		Artillery		Armored		Maintenance
	Intelligence		Publication and Propagation		Logistics		Medical Corps
	Military Police		Modern Warfare		Administrative		Treasury
	Transportation		Telecommunication		IPO (Ideological and Political Org.)		Resistance Force
	Intelligence Protection						

== Naval force branches ==
Branch Insignia	Branch Description	Branch Insignia	Branch Description	Branch Insignia	Branch Description	Branch Insignia	Branch Description
	Naval electrical and electronic		Marine Corps		Navigation		Diving
	Naval Mechanics		Missile and beach to sea artillery				

== Aerospace force branches ==
Branch Insignia	Branch Description	Branch Insignia	Branch Description	Branch Insignia	Branch Description	Branch Insignia	Branch Description
	Aerial electrical and electronics		Ground to ground missile		Air Defense		Flight services
	Pilot		Aerial control		Aerial mechanics		

== See also ==
- Iranian Army Branch Insignia
- Iranian Police Branch Insignia
- Badges of honor in Iran
