= Luftmeldekorpset =

Air Reporting Corps
- Luftmeldekorpset
- Active: 1934–2004
- Country: Denmark
- Branch: Home Guard (from 1952)
- Type: Civil defence organisation
- Role: Aircraft recognition and reporting (1934–1991); Nuclear warfare analysis and fallout warning service (1952–2004)
- Part of: Home Guard Command
- Engagements: Second World War (1939–1945); Cold War (1947–1991)

The Luftmeldekorps (LMK; transl. Air Reporting Corps) was a Danish civil defence organisation which performed aircraft recognition during WWII, and a nuclear warning role from 1952, whilst retaining the aircraft recognition role due to the proximity of Warsaw Pact countries until 1991. The LMK was disbanded in 2004.

== Cooperation with the Royal Observer Corps ==
Following the Second World War, the Danish Home Guard sought to develop the LMK, and looked to an organisation with a similar role, the Royal Observer Corps (ROC) of the United Kingdom.

Aircraft recognition competitions between the LMK and ROC took place annually until 1991, despite the ROC no longer having an operational role of aircraft recognition. Honours remained roughly even over the history of the competitions, with the four man ROC team taking the trophy in the final contest.

Liaison visits were also organised between LMKHQ, located in the basement of the main Carlsberg brewery in Copenhagen, and ROCHQ, based at RAF Bentley Priory.

== See also ==
- Aircraft recognition
- Royal Observer Corps
- Aircraft Identity Corps (Canada)
- Volunteer Air Observers Corps (Australia)
- Ground Observer Corps (USA)
- Civil Air Patrol (USA)
