= Home Guard (Denmark) =

Reserve component of the danish military

Danish Home Guard
- Hjemmeværnet (Danish)
- Logo of the Home Guard
- Motto: Vi stiller op - når det gælder (transl. We show up – when it matters)
- Founded: 11 June 1945; 81 years ago
- Service branches: Army Home Guard; Navy Home Guard; Air Force Home Guard
- Headquarters: Vordingborg Kasserne
- Website: Official website

Leadership
- Commissioner of the Home Guard: MF Hans Andersen (V)
- Chief of the Home Guard: Major General Gunner Arpe Nielsen

Personnel
- Active personnel: 14,800 active volunteers (2025); 550 employees
- Reserve personnel: 30,000 reserve volunteers

Related articles
- Ranks: Ranks and insignia of Home Guard

The Danish Home Guard (Danish: Hjemmeværnet) (HJV) is the fourth service of the Danish Armed Forces. It was formerly concerned only with the defence of Danish territory, but since 2006, it has also supported the Danish military efforts in Afghanistan and Kosovo. The Danish Home Guard has also provided training to Ukrainian soldiers in Ukraine, prior to the Russian invasion of Ukraine. Service is voluntary and unpaid, though members' loss of income from time taken off work, transport expenses and other basic expenses are compensated. However, workshop and depot staff plus clerks and senior officers are all paid. The unarmed Women's Army Corps (Lottekorpset) was merged in 1989 with the then all-male Home Guard to form the present, armed unisex Home Guard.

Its top authority is the Home Guard Command (HJK) which is managed directly by the Danish Ministry of Defence. Only in times of tension and war will the Danish Defence Command assume command over the Home Guard.

The Danish Home Guard is jointly headed by Major General Gunner Arpe Nielsen and a political leader (The Commissioner) who is usually a member of the Danish Parliament. As of February 1, 2024, MF Hans Andersen was named as the new political leader.

== History ==
Created after World War II, the Danish Home Guard was inspired by the Danish Resistance Movement during the war. It was always implied (though never explicitly stated) that the primary objective was defence and guerrilla activity against a potential Soviet invasion.

When founded on 11 June 1945 in the city of Odense, the 250 representatives of resistance movements and those of the government, both had demands to the new Home Guard. The resistance movements were not interested in a people's army run by the government and the government was not interested in a people's army being independent and run solely by a military figure without parliamentary representation. Because of these bi-lateral demands, a compromise was reached in which The Home Guard would have two chief executives: a Major General and a representative chosen by parliament. The organization would be funded by parliament, but organized directly under the Ministry of Defence, so that both sides had control.

With the creation of the Home Guard, the founding members swore to protect the Danish people against all enemies, both foreign and domestic, this referring to the Danish government during the occupation that supported Nazi Germany by handing over Danish citizens to the Gestapo. Despite this, members who had a seat in the government during the occupation claim in their defense that such actions were performed to protect the rest of the people from further war crimes. The Home Guard would be a military wing aiding the defense of Denmark from foreign aggressors and also a constant reminder for politicians who would be tempted by their political powers and influence that they cannot do whatever they please.

With the fall end of the cold war, the Home Guard, with its costly training and equipment, was by many Danes perceived as a useless expense, and an obsolete organization, referring to people's attention that for the past four decades had been drawn outside of Denmark to an enemy that constantly swayed at the back of everyone's mind.

In response to the people's view of the Home Guard, the Danish government entrusted the organization with additional responsibilities in 2004. It should be trained for defense of Danish territory in wartimes but also be able to take on tasks to help civilians during disasters of most kinds, thereby rebalancing the expenses many had thought of as unnecessary.

The Danish government changed the Home Guard organisational structure and is now mainly an organisation to reinforce and to support the Army, the Navy, and the Air Force in fulfilling their missions. It became the fourth branch of the Danish Forces. The Home Guard was being included in the government's Defense Act. In Denmark a public debate raise whether or not this organization now voluntarily owes its loyalty to the government rather than the Danish people.

Also the separation into two basic parts, the active force and the reserve get more obverse. To be eligible for active status, one must serve at least 24 documented hours in a calendar year.

Additionally, a force element called Centre for Stabilization Engagement (CSI) (Danish Home Guard's international) has been created. Centre for Stabilization Engagement is responsible for the Danish Home Guard's international tasks and contributions to Denmark's international stabilization engagement. The Danish Home Guard's contribution includes military capacity building, military support to civilian reconstruction, support to humanitarian efforts, and other international tasks, including security force protection. With a small mission in Iraq, the Home Guard started a number of missions abroad mostly with the Danish forces or allies of Denmark. In 2019 the Home Guard contributed volunteer instructors and one permanent officer to the British-led mission in Ukraine OP ORBITAL. Denmark supported the mission with mobile training teams (MTT) through the peace and stabilization program for Ukraine. The instructors were responsible for teaching approx. 800 Ukrainian soldiers in basic military skills.

An increasing number of qualified Home Guard personnel are being sent abroad on an equal basis with the Army, Navy and Air Force, most notably as Protection Teams under the auspices of Jægerkorpset, and also as guard platoons in Kosovo and Afghanistan.

== Structure ==
=== Structure in the late 1980s ===
In the late 1980s, the Home Guard Command was headquartered in Copenhagen and administered the home guard during peacetime. In case of war, the home guard units would have reinforced the other three armed services.

The Army Home Guard was commanded by a Major General. Home guard units were tasked to secure and guard key infrastructure, and report and delay enemy infiltrations by air or sea in their area of operation. The Army Home Guard divided Denmark into seven territorial regions, which were each commanded by a Colonel.(army reserve unit's are not shown on this list)

- Army Home Guard
  - 1st Territorial Region (Northern Jutland) in Aalborg
    - 6 × Homeguard Districts
    - 6 × Homeguard Staff Companies
    - 31 × Area Companies
    - 6 × Homeguard Military Police Companies
  - 2nd Territorial Region (Middle Jutland) in Viborg
    - 10 × Homeguard Districts
    - 10 × Homeguard Staff Companies
    - 56 × Area Companies
    - 10 × Homeguard Military Police Companies
  - 3rd Territorial Region (Southern Jutland) in Haderslev
    - 11 × Homeguard Districts
    - 11 × Homeguard Staff companies
    - 53 × Area Companies
    - 11 × Homeguard Military Police Companies
  - 4th Territorial Region (Funen) in Odense
    - 5 × Homeguard Districts
    - 5 × Homeguard staff companies
    - 32 × Area Companies
    - 5 × Homeguard Military Police Companies
  - 5th Territorial Region (Zealand) in Ringsted
    - 9 × Homeguard Districts
    - 9 × Homeguard Staff Companies
    - 50 × Area Companies
    - 9 × Homeguard Military Police Companies
  - 6th Territorial Region (Northern Zealand/Copenhagen) in Copenhagen
    - 4 × Homeguard Districts (Northern Zealand)
    - 4 × Homeguard Staff Companies
    - 15 × Area Companies
    - 4 × Homeguard Military Police Companies
  - 7th Territorial Region (Bornholm), responsible for Bornholm
    - 1x Homeguard District
      - Homeguard Staff Company
      - 5x Homeguard Area Companies
      - Homeguard Military Police Company

The Air Force Home Guard would have provided additional ground and air defense personnel to the Air Force, and would have staffed the co-located operating base at which U.S. Air Force reinforcement would have been based.

The Naval Home Guard (Marinehjemmeværnet (MHV)) had a small number of ships for coastal surveillance. These included the MH-90-class cutters: MHV 90 Bopa, MHV 91 Brigaden, MHV 92 Holger Danske, MHV 93 Hvidsten, MHV 94 Ringen, and MHV 95 Speditøren.

=== Structure in 2017 ===
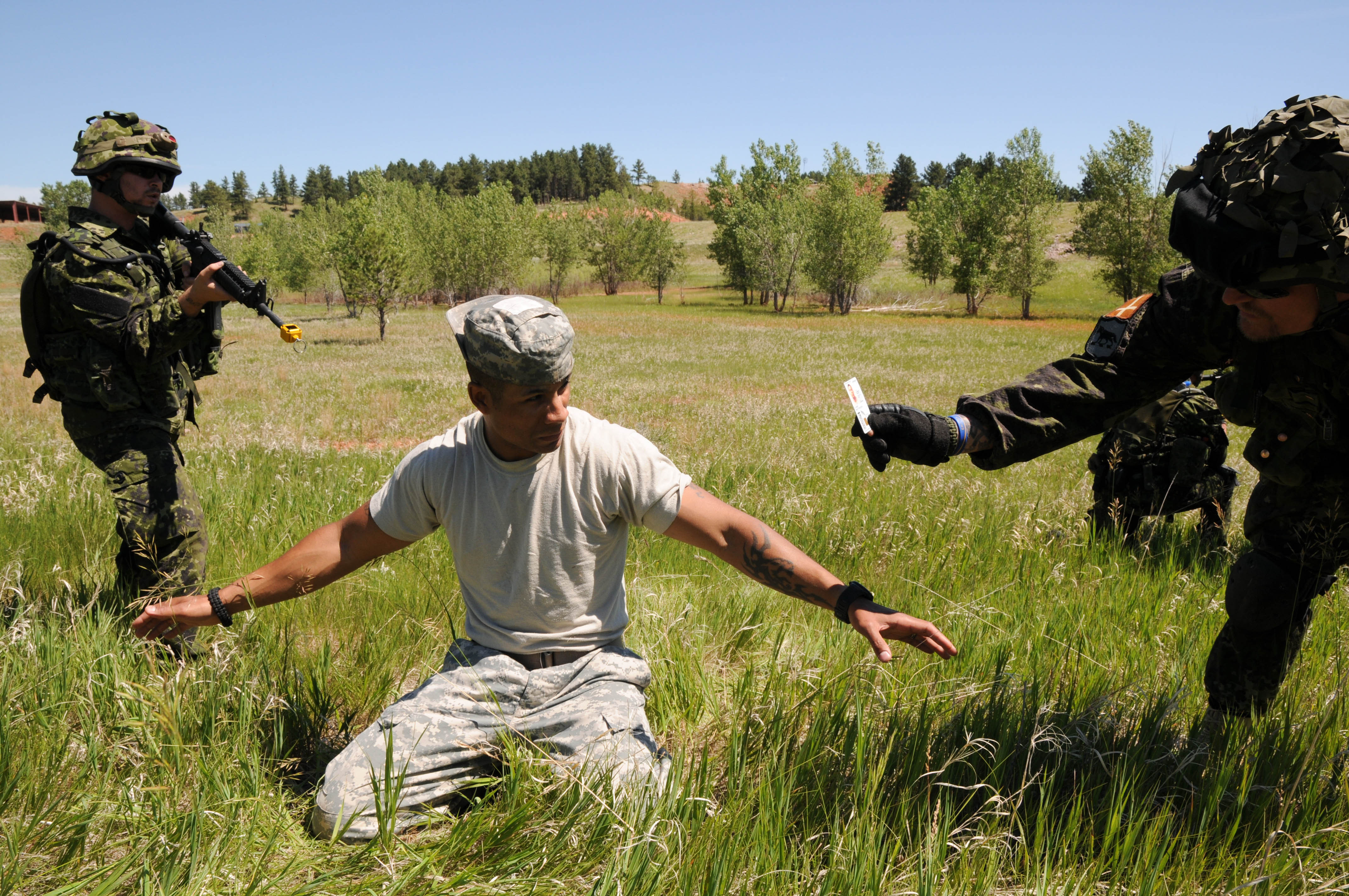
Danish Army Home Guard personnel secure and verify the identity of a subject during US Army National Guard exercise Golden Coyote

As of 2024, the Danish Home Guard consists of approximately 42,800 members, of whom approximately 12,800 are active. It is divided into three branches:

=== Army Home Guard ===
The Army Home Guard (Hærhjemmeværnet) is numerically the largest part of the Home Guard, and works closely with the regular army, police and the civil disaster management authorities.

Denmark is divided into two Regional commands, east and west, commanded by full-service colonels, and subdivided into 12 Army Home Guard Districts commanded by full-service officers.

Every municipality has at least one "army home guard company" commanded by a volunteer captain.

==== Structure ====
- Regional District West
  - Army Home Guard District North Jutland (Aalborg)
  - Army Home Guard District Middle and West Jutland (Skive)
  - Army Home Guard District East Jutland (Aarhus)
  - Army Home Guard District Southeast Jutland (Vejle)
  - Army Home Guard District South Jutland and Schleswig (Søgaard)
  - Army Home Guard District Funen (Odense)
  - Special Support and Reconnaissance Company (parts of the unit)
- Regional District East
  - Army Home Guard District Copenhagen
  - Army Home Guard District South Zeeland and Lolland-Falster
  - Army Home Guard District Middle and West Zeeland
  - Army Home Guard District North Zeeland
  - Army Home Guard District Copenhagen's Western Area
  - Bornholm's Home Guard
  - Special Support and Reconnaissance Company (HQPLT and main part of the unit)

==== Police Home Guard ====
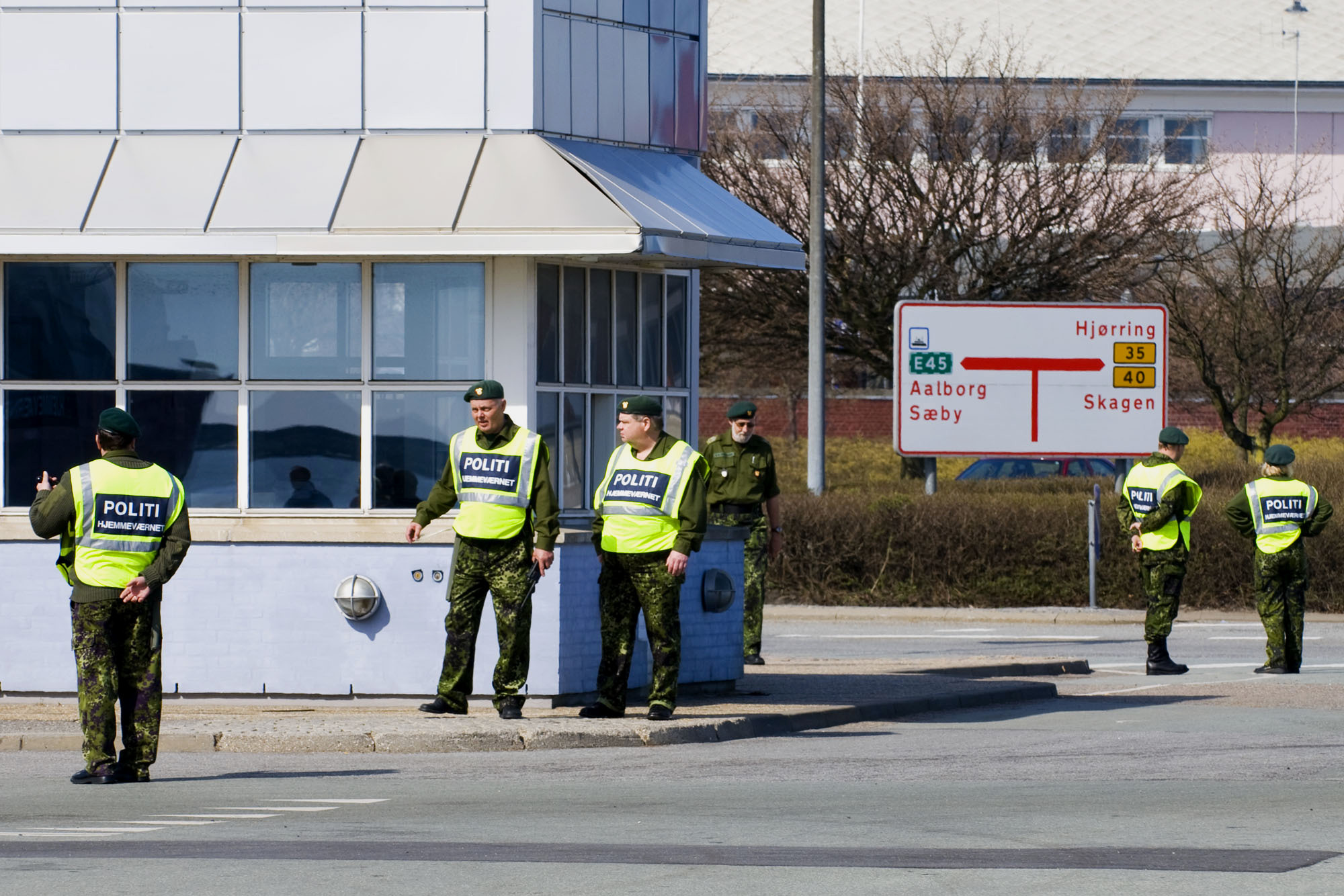
Police Home Guard volunteers during a public event

The Police Home Guard (Politihjemmeværnet) is a branch within the Army Home Guard and consists of 47 Police Home Guard companies, commanded by volunteer captains, often with a professional police career. The volunteers are, during operational service, given the authority to act on behalf of the police with a limited legal authority. Their tasks are, among others, traffic control at festivals, searching for victims, and guarding community installations. In peacetime they are never used where there are risks of direct confrontation with civilians (riot control or planned arrests).

==== Infrastructure Home Guard ====
The Infrastructure Home Guard (Virksomhedshjemmeværnet) is a branch within the Army Home Guard and ensures that civilian companies and authorities continue operating during times of crisis or catastrophe. The Infrastructure Home Guard is divided into five branches:

- Transportation
- Communications
- Power Supply
- Water
- Health

All but mainly employees within the five branches can participate in the nine Infrastructure Home Guard Companies situated all over Denmark.

The members of the companies assist in keeping their places of work intact and prevent sabotage with use of lethal force. In peacetime the companies typically assist in guarding important railway lines or power plants.

Within the Regional Commands are a number of Liaison Officers who are experts in matters concerning the five branches. Manpower from the regular Army Home Guard can then be used with the right guidance in various situations.

=== Naval Home Guard ===
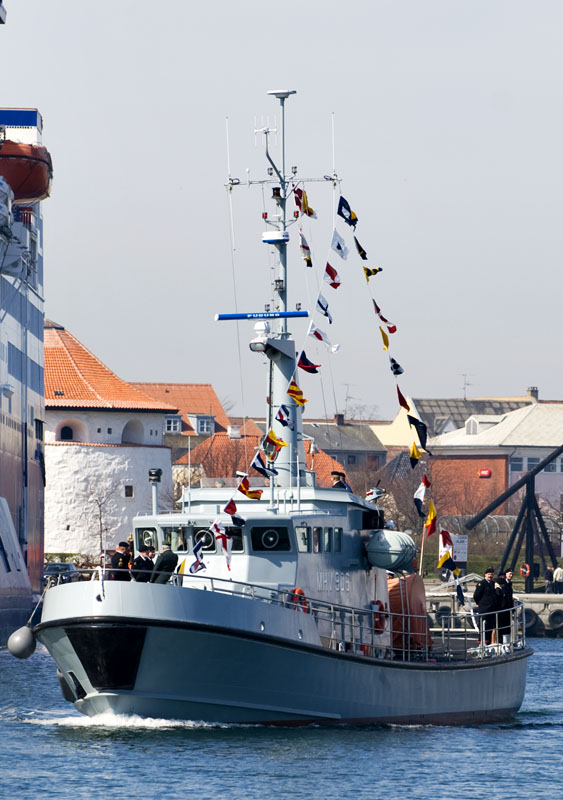
Danish Naval Home Guard vessel MHV906 Fænø

The Naval Home Guard (Marinehjemmeværnet) deals with securing naval installations, patrolling of the Danish territorial waters, and carries out Search and Rescue missions. It supports scientific research for Danish universities, provides vessels for police and customs operations ashore, and supports exercises and training of other military units (navy, special operations forces, etc.).

The Danish Naval Home Guard is commanded by a full service naval captain (kommandør) and a staff of professional full-service personnel. The organisation was totally revised by 1 January 2017. The professional staff is supported by voluntary service staff personnel of experts, planning personnel, advisors, specialists and instructors.

The Navy Home Guard comprises 35 flotillas (company sized units), with 30 "general-purpose" flotillas equipped with 900 klassen and 800 klassen ships, along with one flotilla equipped with 2 trailer-based speedboats and command vehicles. Their primary missions include surveillance, picture building, and security in territorial waters, as well as search and rescue operations.

Additionally, the Navy Home Guard maintains four highly specialized Maritime Force Protection (MFP) flotillas, utilizing speedboats and drones for harbor protection and escorts. These 35 units are always on a 1-hour call for search and rescue, military, and police deployments.

Alongside its operational prowess, the Navy Home Guard has two music corps and a staff unit.

The flotillas are all commanded by volunteer naval lieutenants (kaptajnløjtnanter).

=== Air Force Home Guard ===
The Air Force Home Guard (Flyverhjemmeværnet), supports the Danish air force, the police and other national authorities in their emergency management by securing airports, performing aerial environmental patrols of national waters.

Since 2019 the Air Force Home Guard, has been deployed to the EU and Schengen mission FRONTEX in support of EU/Schengens borders.

- The Air Force Home Guard is commanded by a full-service air force colonel. The commander is supported by a small staff of full-service personnel.
- Municipalities with airfields or in the vicinity of airports have "air force home guard squadrons" – (100–150 riflemen), commanded by volunteer captains.
- The Air Force Home Guard operate two DHC-6 Twin Otter.

== The Home Guard in civil society ==
The Home Guard often gives so-called ordinary help to other authorities, especially the police. It's especially Police Home Guard companies that aid in directing traffic, but also help for searching for missing persons and objects, and guarding crime scenes and such.

During COP15 in 2009, 1200 soldiers from the Home Guard aided the police in Copenhagen. Most of them were guarding and patrolling, but some of them were VIP drivers.

Members of a police company are also trained to give so-called special help to the police, which means tasks that are likely to involve the use of force against civilians (all kinds of police work). This help is to be negotiated between the Secretary of Defense and the Secretary of Justice.

== Equipment ==
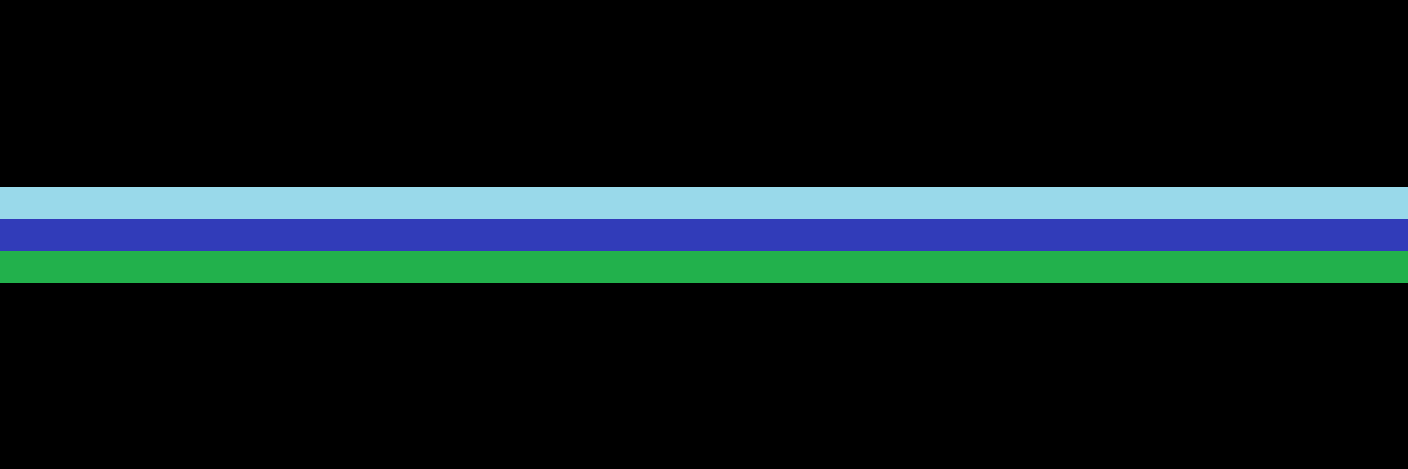
Stable belt worn by the Home Guard.

The basic infantry weapon of the Home Guard is the 5.56mm GV M/95, while motorized units are equipped with the Kb M/96.

Suppressive fire is provided by the M/60 and M/62 machine guns and LSV M/04 light support weapon. Squad level anti-tank capabilities are provided with the M72 LAW.

The Home Guard utilizes a variety of different civilian transport vehicles and a small number of Mercedes GD light utility vehicle.

== See also ==
- Ranks and insignia of Danish Home Guard
- Militia
- Luftmeldekorpset
