= MHV900-class patrol boat =

Class of boats in the Danish Home Guard

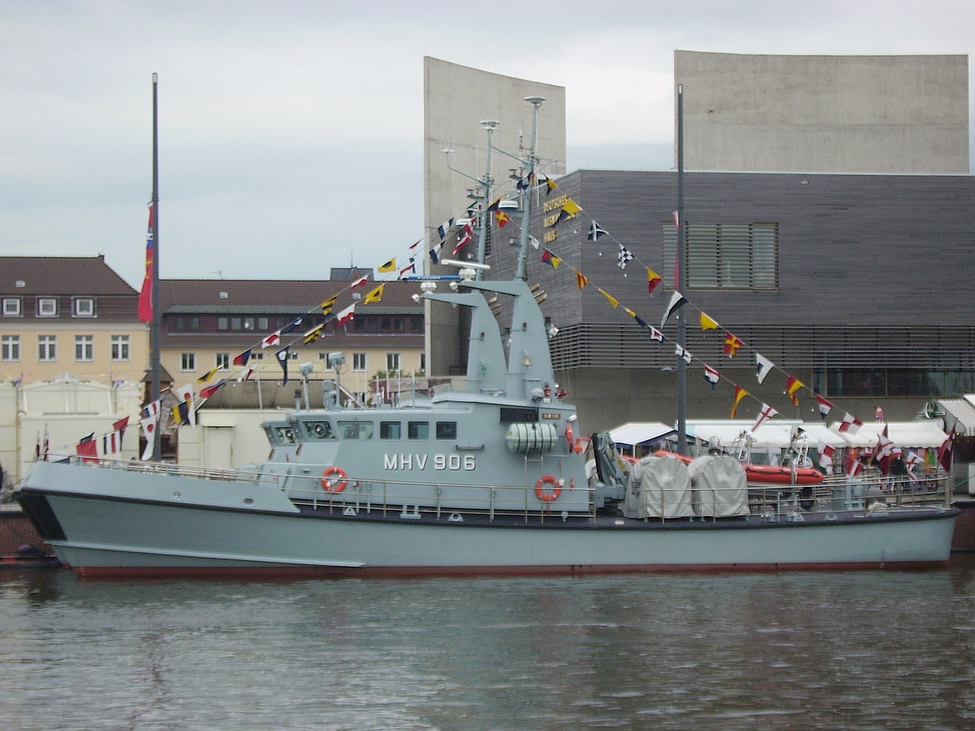
- MHV906

Class overview
- Name: MHV900 class
- Operators: Royal Danish Navy
- In commission: 2003
- Completed: 12
- Active: 12

General characteristics
- Type: Patrol boat
- Displacement: 87 t (86 long tons)
- Length: 27.2 m (89 ft 3 in)
- Beam: 5.6 m (18 ft 4 in)
- Draught: 2.5 m (8 ft 2 in)
- Propulsion: 2× Scania diesel engines; 2 × 500 bhp (370 kW)
- Speed: 13 knots (24 km/h; 15 mph)
- Complement: 12
- Sensors & processing systems: Navigation radar: Furuno; I-band
- Armament: 2 × MG 3 machine guns

The MHV900 class is a series of ships in service with the Danish Home Guard. It is a further development of the MHV800 class. These ships are about 3.5 metres (11 ft 6 in) longer and 10 tons heavier than the preceding class. The ships are primarily used for monitoring at sea, search and rescue, and environmental protection at sea. The increased size allows the ship class to carry two float locks of 180 m (590 ft), which gives the Danish pollution preparedness a noticeable lift upward. In addition, the class is equipped with several fire pumps and a water cannon, which can be used for firefighting.
