= Islamic Republic of Iran Army branch insignia =

Seal of Islamic Republic of Iran Army

Branch insignia of the Islamic Republic of Iran Army refers to military emblems that may be worn on the uniform of the Iranian Army to denote membership in a particular area of expertise and series of functional areas.

== General branches ==
Branch Insignia	Branch Description	Branch Insignia	Branch Description	Branch Insignia	Branch Description	Branch Insignia	Branch Description
	Command and Staff Branch		Armored Branch		Art Branch		Artillery Branch
	Electronics Branch		Engineering and Construction Branch		Administrative Branch		Industries Branch
	Infantry Branch		Intelligence Branch		Ideological and Political Branch		Information Technology Branch
	Judicial and Legal Branch		Logistics Branch		Mechanics Branch		Military Police Branch
	Music Branch		Ordnance Branch		Medical Branch		Services Branch
	Modern Warfare Branch		Telecommunications and Electronic Warfare Branch		Treasury Branch		Transportation Branch

== Naval force branches ==
Branch Insignia	Branch Description	Branch Insignia	Branch Description
	Marine Corps Branch		Ship Commandment Branch

== Air force branches ==
Branch Insignia	Branch Description	Branch Insignia	Branch Description	Branch Insignia	Branch Description
	Air Defense Branch		Air Operations Branch		Air Support Operations Branch

== See also ==
- Badges of honor in Iran
- Islamic Revolutionary Guard Corps Branch Insignia
- Iranian Police Branch Insignia
