= Police Command of the Islamic Republic of Iran branch insignia =

Seal of Iranian Police (NAJA)

Branch insignia of the Iranian Police refers to military emblems that may be worn on the uniform of the Iranian Police to denote membership in a particular area of expertise and series of functional areas.

== Branch of service insignia ==
The following are the branch insignia emblems of the Iranian Police:
as of 2020"

Branch Insignia	Branch Description	Branch Insignia	Branch Description	Branch Insignia	Branch Description
	Command and Staff Branch - worn by IRGC Generals who serve in Police		Command and Staff Branch - worn by Army Generals who serve in Police		Forest and Rangeland Protection Unit
	Art Branch		Border Guard Branch		Criminal Investigation Branch
	Engineering and Construction Branch		Intelligence Branch		Ideological and Political Branch
	Information Technology Branch		Judicial and Legal Branch		Law Enforcement Branch
	Logistics Branch		Naval Branch		Special Force Branch
	Telecommunications Branch		Traffic Branch		Treasury Branch
	Administrative Branch		Aviation Branch		Healthcare Branch
	Cyberspace Police Branch				

== See also ==
- Badges of honor in Iran
- Iranian Army Branch Insignia
- Islamic Revolutionary Guard Corps Branch Insignia
