= Home Guard Command (Denmark) =

- Hjemmeværnskommandoen
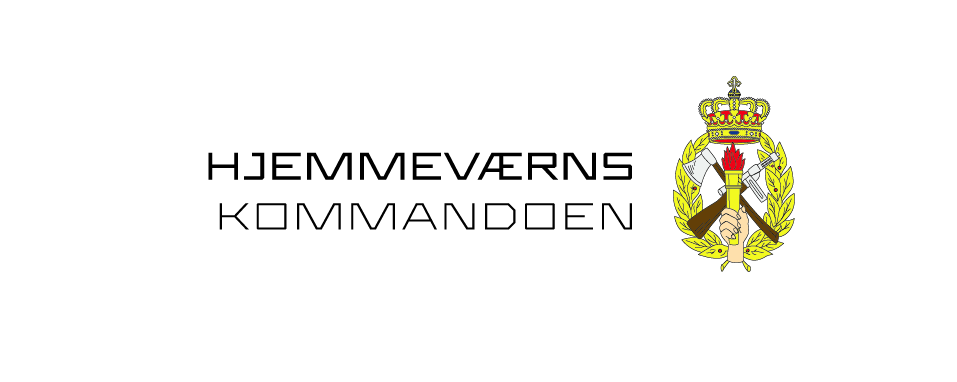
- Danish Home Guard Command logo
- Active: 1 April 1949; 77 years ago
- Country: Kingdom of Denmark
- Branch: Joined/shared
- Part of: Ministry of Defence
- Headquarters: Vordingborg Kaserne
- Website: Official Website

Commanders
- The Commanding General of The Home Guard: Major general Jens Garly
- The Commissioner of The Home Guard: Søren Espersen

Home Guard Command (Danish: Hjemmeværnskommandoen), is the Danish Home Guard's top authority and is a level one authority reporting directly to the Ministry of Defence.

The Home Guard is a volunteer military organization offering a permanent state of readiness. The task of the Home Guard is to support the armed forces - nationally as well as internationally. In addition to this, the Home Guard supports the police, the emergency services, and other civilian authorities. The Home Guard contributes internationally with guard duty, build-up of military capacity, and support to civilian reconstruction.

The Home Guard has a combined military and civilian leadership. The Commanding General of the Home Guard is responsible for the training and posting of units and managing the Home Guard. The Commissioner of the Home Guard is responsible for recruitment and the public support to the Home Guard in Denmark and general defence in the Danish community.

In times of tension and war the Danish Defence Command assume command over the activated Home Guard units.

Until 2014, the Home Guard Command was located at Generalstok in Kastellet, in Copenhagen. It was then temporarily relocated to Søkvæsthuset in central Copenhagen. From August 2015, it will be placed at Vordingborg Barracks.

== Chiefs of the Home Guard ==
No.	Portrait	Name (born–died)	Term of office			Ref.
No.	Portrait	Name (born–died)	Took office	Left office	Time in office	Ref.
1	Erik Johnstad-Møller [da]	Major general Erik Johnstad-Møller (1894–1982) de facto from 1948	1 April 1949	1959	9–10 years	
2	Povl Martin Digmann	Major general Povl Martin Digmann (1900–1969)	1959	1965	5–6 years	
3	Ole-Christian Permin [da]	Major general Ole-Christian Permin (1913–1995)	1965	1977	11–12 years	
4	Jørgen Andreassen	Major general Jørgen Andreassen (1919–1999)	1977	1984	6–7 years	
5	Rud Gottlieb	Major general Rud Gottlieb	1984	1993	8–9 years	
6	Jørgen Sverker Nilsson [da]	Major general Jørgen Sverker Nilsson (born 1938)	1993	28 February 1998	4–5 years	
7	Ulf Scheibye [da]	Major general Ulf Scheibye (born 1944)	1 March 1998	31 July 2004	6 years, 152 days	
8	Jan Norgaard [da]	Major general Jan Norgaard (born 1950)	1 August 2004	30 April 2010	5 years, 272 days	
9	Finn Winkler	Major general Finn Winkler (born 1957)	1 May 2010	31 July 2017	7 years, 91 days	
10	Jens Garly	Major general Jens Garly (born 1962)	1 August 2017	31 December 2024	7 years, 152 days	
11	Gunner Arpe Nielsen [da]	Major general Gunner Arpe Nielsen (born 1967)	1 January 2025	Incumbent	1 year, 144 days	
