= Commander-captain =

Commander-captain or commanding captain is a naval rank, used in several navies, including those of all Scandinavian nations. It is rated OF-4 within NATO forces.

== Scandinavia ==
=== Denmark ===
On 11 February 1693, the rank was codified, by King Christian V, with the publication of the updated Danish order of precedence. Here "Commandeur-Capitain til Søes" was placed below Schout by Nacht, above Capitain and equal to Major. As of 2022, the rank is positioned below Kommandør and above Orlogskaptajn. It holds the grade of M401 within the Ministry of Defence's pay structure. Officially, the rank is translated as "Commander, Senior Grade".

=== Sweden ===
In the Swedish Navy, the rank of Kommendörkapten is ranked below Kommendör and above Örlogskapten. Before 1972, the rank was divided into two ranks: kommendörkapten av 1:a graden/klassen and kommendörkapten av 2:a graden/klassen.

== Gallery ==
Kommandørkaptajn
(Royal Danish Navy)

Komentajakapteeni
(Swedish: Kommendörkapten)
(Finnish Navy)

Komandkapteinis
(Latvian Naval Forces)

Kommandørkaptein
(Royal Norwegian Navy)

Căpitan-comandor
(Romanian Naval Forces)

Kommendörkapten
(Swedish Navy)
