= List of titles and honours of Mohammad Reza Pahlavi =

The Imperial coat of arms of Iran under the Pahlavi dynasty, used from 1925 to 1979.

Mohammad Reza Pahlavi (26 October 1919 – 27 July 1980) held numerous titles and honours, both during and before his time as Shah of Iran.

== Royal titles and styles ==
Styles of Mohammad Reza Shah of Iran
- Reference style: His Imperial Majesty
- Spoken style: Your Imperial Majesty
- Alternative style: Sir, Aryamehr

- 24 April 1926 – 16 September 1941 His Imperial Highness The Crown Prince of Iran
- 16 September 1941 – 26 October 1967 His Majesty The Shah of Iran
- 26 October 1967 – 27 July 1980 His Imperial Majesty The Shahanshah of Iran

From his father's accession to the throne, on 15 December 1925, until his own accession, on 16 September 1941, Mohammad Reza held the style and title of His Imperial Highness The Crown Prince. Mohammad Reza deliberately chose to crown himself as Shah ('King'), rather than Shahanshah ('King of Kings'), pledging that he would not do so until he turned Iran into a prosperous and modernised nation. On the 26th year of his reign, in 1967, his imperial coronation ceremony took place and he was elevated to the title of Shahanshah.

On 15 September 1965, Mohammad Reza was granted the title of Aryamehr ('Light of the Aryans') by an extraordinary session of the joint Houses of Parliament.

== Military ranks ==
Imperial State of Iran

- 1938 – 1938: Second Lieutenant, Imperial Iranian Army
- 1938 – 16 September 1941: Captain, Imperial Iranian Army
- 16 September 1941 – 21 July 1952: Commander-in-Chief of the Iranian Armed Forces (Note: Prime Minister Mohammad Mossadegh was granted emergency powers by the Shah to rule by decree. While holding office as the Prime Minister and Minister of War (renamed to "Ministry of National Defence") simultaneously. Mossadegh went over the authority of the Shah, the Commander-in-Chief vetted in the Persian Constitution of 1906, and appointed commanders in Imperial Iranian Army and police force.)
- 19 August 1953 – 11 February 1979: Commander-in-Chief Iranian Armed Forces

== Honours ==
=== National dynastic honours ===
Appointments

Country	Date	Appointment	
Imperial State of Iran	16 September 1941 – 27 July 1980	Sovereign	of the Order of Zolfaghar
Imperial State of Iran	12 December 1946 – 4 February 1949	Member 3rd Class	of the Order of Zolfaghar
Imperial State of Iran	4 February 1949 – 27 July 1980	Member 2nd Class	of the Order of Zolfaghar
Imperial State of Iran	1932 – 16 September 1941	Member 1st Class	of the Order of Pahlavi
Imperial State of Iran	16 September 1941 – 27 July 1980	Sovereign	of the Order of Pahlavi
Imperial State of Iran	26 September 1967 – 27 July 1980	Sovereign of the Order of Aryamehr	
Imperial State of Iran	16 September 1941 – 26 September 1967	Sovereign of the Order of Aftab	
Imperial State of Iran	16 September 1941 – 27 July 1980	Sovereign of the Order of Aqdas	
Imperial State of Iran	16 September 1941 – 27 July 1980	Sovereign of the Order of the Lion and the Sun	
Imperial State of Iran	24 April 1926 – 16 September 1941	Member 1st Class	of the Order of the Crown
Imperial State of Iran	16 September 1941 – 27 July 1980	Sovereign	of the Order of the Crown
Imperial State of Iran	1957 – 27 July 1980	Sovereign of the Order of the Pleiades	
Imperial State of Iran	1938 – 16 September 1941	Member 3rd Class	of the Military Order of Merit
Imperial State of Iran	1938 – 16 September 1941	Member 1st Class	of the Military Order of Merit
Imperial State of Iran	16 September 1941 – 27 July 1980	Sovereign	of the Military Order of Merit
Imperial State of Iran	1938 – 16 September 1941	Member 3rd Class	of the Military Order of Sepah
Imperial State of Iran	1938 – 16 September 1941	Member 2nd Class	of the Military Order of Sepah
Imperial State of Iran	1938 – 16 September 1941	Member 1st Class	of the Military Order of Sepah
Imperial State of Iran	16 September 1941 – 27 July 1980	Sovereign	of the Military Order of Sepah
Imperial State of Iran	16 September 1941 – 27 July 1980	Sovereign of the Order of the Red Lion and the Sun	
Imperial State of Iran	12 December 1946 – 16 September 1941	Member 1st Class	of the Order of Honor
Imperial State of Iran	16 September 1941 – 27 July 1980	Sovereign	of the Order of Honor
Imperial State of Iran	16 September 1941 – 27 July 1980	Sovereign of the Order of Service	
Imperial State of Iran	16 September 1941 – 27 July 1980	Sovereign of the Order of Three Star Service	
Imperial State of Iran		Member 1st Class	of the Order of Pas
Imperial State of Iran	16 September 1941 – 27 July 1980	Sovereign	of the Order of Pas
Imperial State of Iran	16 September 1941 – 27 July 1980	Sovereign of the Order of Homayoun	
Imperial State of Iran	– 27 July 1980	Sovereign of the Order of Gratitude	
Imperial State of Iran	– 27 July 1980	Sovereign of the Order of Avecinna	
Imperial State of Iran	– 27 July 1980	Sovereign of the Order of Sciences	
Imperial State of Iran	– 27 July 1980	Sovereign of the Order of Splendor	
Imperial State of Iran	– 27 July 1980	Sovereign of the Order of Official Merit	
Imperial State of Iran	– 27 July 1980	Sovereign of the Order of the Military Police	
Imperial State of Iran	– 27 July 1980	Sovereign of the Order of the Police	
Imperial State of Iran	– 27 July 1980	Sovereign of the Order of Razy	
Imperial State of Iran	– 27 July 1980	Sovereign of the Order of Arts	

Decorations and medals

Country	Date	Decoration/Medal	
Imperial State of Iran	15 October 1971	Sovereign recipient of the Persepolis Medal	
Imperial State of Iran	14 October 1971	Sovereign recipient of the Commemorative Medal of the 2,500 year Celebration of the Persian Empire	
Imperial State of Iran	26 October 1967	Sovereign of the Imperial Coronation Medal	
Imperial State of Iran		Sovereign recipient of the Land Reform Medal	
Imperial State of Iran		Sovereign recipient of the Scout Medal	
Imperial State of Iran		Sovereign recipient of the Sport Medal	
Imperial State of Iran	1953	Sovereign recipient of the 1953 Coup d'état Medal	
Imperial State of Iran	1978	Sovereign recipient of the Reza Shah Centennial Medal	
Imperial State of Iran	24 April 1926	Recipient of the Reza Shah Coronation Medal	
Imperial State of Iran	12 December 1946	First Class	of the Azarabadegan Medal
Imperial State of Iran	12 December 1946	Sovereign	of the Azarabadegan Medal
Imperial State of Iran	24 April 1926	Knight of the Imperial Family Decoration of Reza Shah	
Imperial State of Iran		Sovereign of the Decoration of Sorrow	
Imperial State of Iran		Sovereign of the Farr Medal	
Imperial State of Iran		Sovereign of the Marksmanship Medal	
Imperial State of Iran		Sovereign of the Medal for Bravery	
Imperial State of Iran		Sovereign of the Medal of Cooperation	
Imperial State of Iran		Sovereign of the Medal of Avecinna	
Imperial State of Iran		Sovereign of the Medal of Homayoun	
Imperial State of Iran		Sovereign of the Medal of Honor	
Imperial State of Iran		Sovereign of the Medal of Effort	
Imperial State of Iran		Sovereign of the Medal of Military Education	
Imperial State of Iran		Sovereign of the Medal of Military Merit	
Imperial State of Iran		Sovereign of the Medal of Service (Civilian)	
Imperial State of Iran		Sovereign of the Medal of Service (Military)	
Imperial State of Iran		Sovereign of the Medal of Splendor	
Imperial State of Iran		Sovereign of the Medal of the Hero	
Imperial State of Iran		Sovereign of the Medal of the Pleiades	
Imperial State of Iran		Sovereign of the Military Medal	
Imperial State of Iran		Sovereign of the Padash Medal	
Imperial State of Iran		Sovereign of the Physical Education & Recreation and Organization of Iran Medal	
Imperial State of Iran		Sovereign of the Senior Marksmanship Medal	
Imperial State of Iran		Sovereign of the Sepahy Medal	
Imperial State of Iran		Sovereign of the Third Isfand Decoration	
Imperial State of Iran		Sovereign of the Rastakhiz Medal	

== Foreign honours ==
Country	Date	Appointment/Decoration	
(Albania) Albanian Kingdom	1975 – 27 July 1980	Recipient of the Order of Fidelity of the House of Zogu	
(Afghanistan) Afghan Royal Family	before 1942 – 27 July 1980	Member 1st Class	of the Order of the Supreme Sun
(Afghanistan) Afghan Royal Family	26 March 1950	Collar	of the Order of the Supreme Sun
Argentina	17 May 1965 – 27 July 1980	Collar of the Order of the Liberator General San Martin	
Austria	15 March 1958 – 27 July 1980	Grand Star of the Decoration of Honour for Services to the Republic of Austria	
Bahrain	1975 – 27 July 1980	Collar of the Order of Al-Khalifa	
Belgium	15 March 1939 – 27 July 1980	Grand Cordon (Civil division)	of the Order of Leopold
Belgium	11 May 1960 – 27 July 1980	Grand Cordon with Swords (Military division)	of the Order of Leopold
Brazil	4 May 1965 – 27 July 1980	Grand Collar of the Order of the Southern Cross	
Czechoslovakia	22 March 1939 – 27 July 1980	Member 1st Class (Civil division)	of the Order of the White Lion
Czechoslovakia	December 1943 – 27 July 1980	Member 1st Class with Collar (Military division)	of the Order of the White Lion
Republic of China	3 June 1946 – 27 July 1980	Recipient of the Order of Propitious Clouds	
Republic of China	5 May 1958 – 27 July 1980	Recipient of the Order of Brilliant Jade	
Democratic Republic of the Congo	23 February 1974 – 27 July 1980	Grand Cordon of the National Order of the Leopard	
Denmark	14 May 1959 – 27 July 1980	Knight of the Order of the Elephant	
(Egypt) Egyptian Royal Family	16 March 1939 – 27 July 1980	Collar of the Order of Muhammad Ali	
Egypt	7 January 1975 – 27 July 1980	Collar of the Order of the Nile	
(Ethiopia) Ethiopian Imperial Family	14 September 1964 – 27 July 1980	Knight with Collar of the Order of Solomon	
Finland	22 June 1970 – 27 July 1980	Commander Grand Cross of the Order of the Lion of Finland	
France	15 June 1939 – 27 July 1980	Grand Cross of the Legion of Honour	
France	3 August 1948 – 27 July 1980	Croix de Guerre with Palm	
Gabon	22 October 1975 – 27 July 1980	Grand Cross of the Order of the Equatorial Star	
(Greece) Greek Royal Family	1960 – 27 July 1980	Knight Grand Cross of the Royal Order of the Redeemer	
Hungary	September 1967 – 27 July 1980	Member 1st Class of the Order of the Flag of the Republic of Hungary	
(Kingdom of Iraq) Iraqi Royal Family	14 June 1949 – 27 July 1980	Recipient of the Order of the Hashimites of Iraq	
(Kingdom of Iraq) Iraqi Royal Family	March 1939 – 27 July 1980	Grand Cross of the Order of the Two Rivers (Civil division)	
(Iraq) Iraqi Republic	13 February 1967 – 27 July 1980	Grand Cross of the Order of the Two Rivers (Military division)	
Italy	20 August 1948 – 27 July 1980	War Merit Cross	
Italy	26 August 1957 – 27 July 1980	Knight Grand Cross with Collar of the Order of Merit of the Italian Republic	
Holy See	20 August 1948 – 27 July 1980	Knight of the Order of the Golden Spur	
Japan	13 May 1958 – 27 July 1980	Collar of the Order of the Chrysanthemum	
Japan	1957 – 27 July 1980	Golden Pheasant Award of the Scout Association of Japan	
Jordan	28 July 1949 – 27 July 1980	Collar of the Order of al-Hussein bin Ali	
Jordan	28 July 1949 – 27 July 1980	Grand Cordon with Brilliants of the Supreme Order of the Renaissance	
Kuwait	1974 – 27 July 1980	Collar of the Order of Mubarak the Great	
Lebanon	after 1942; before 1926 – 27 July 1980	Member Extraordinary Grade of the National Order of the Cedar	
Lebanon	17 October 1956 – 27 July 1980	Member Extraordinary Grade of the Order of Merit	
(Libya) Libyan Royal Family	13 May 1958 – 27 July 1980	Grand Collar of the Order of Idris I	
Malaysia	16 January 1968 – 27 July 1980	Honorary Member of the Order of the Crown of the Realm	
Mexico	8 May 1975 – 27 July 1980	Collar of the Order of the Aztec Eagle	
Morocco	11 June 1966 – 27 July 1980	Member Special Class of the Order of Muhammad	
(Kingdom of Nepal) Nepal	3 July 1960 – 27 July 1980	Member of the rder of Ojaswi Rajanya	
Netherlands	19 May 1959 – 27 July 1980	Knight Grand Cross of the Order of the Netherlands Lion	
Netherlands	April 30, 1962	Silver Wedding Anniversary Medal of Queen Juliana and Prince Bernhard	
Norway	17 May 1961 – 27 July 1980	Grand Cross with Collar of the Order of St. Olav	
Oman	2 March 1974 – 27 July 1980	Member 1st Class of the Order of Oman (Military division)	
Pakistan	9 November 1959 – 27 July 1980	Recipient of the Order of Pakistan	
Poland	19 September 1967 – 27 July 1980	Grand Cross of the Order of Polonia Restituta	
Portugal	27 July 1967 – 27 July 1980	Grand Collar of the Order of Prince Henry	
Qatar	13 November 1975 – 27 July 1980	Collar of the Order of Independence	
Romania	27 May 1966 – 27 July 1980	Recipient of the Order of the Star of the Romanian People's Republic	
Saudi Arabia	28 April 1975 – 27 July 1980	Great Chain of Badr	
Saudi Arabia	9 August 1955 or 12 March 1957 – 27 July 1980	Recipient of the Order of Abdulaziz al Saud	
House of Savoy	6 July 1976 – 27 July 1980	Knight of the Supreme Order of the Most Holy Annunciation	
House of Savoy	6 July 1976 – 27 July 1980	Knight Grand Cross of the Crown of Italy	
House of Savoy	6 July 1976 – 27 July 1980	Knight Grand Cross of the Order of Saints Maurice and Lazarus	
Somalia	28 December 1977 – 27 July 1980	Recipient of the Order of the Somali Star	
Spain	19 April 1975 – 27 July 1980	Knight of the Collar of the Order of Charles III	
Spain	22 May 1957 – 27 July 1980	Knight of the Collar of the Order of Isabella the Catholic	
Sudan	24 February 1974 – 27 July 1980	Collar of Honour	
Syria	after 1942; before 1926 – 27 July 1980	Member 1st Class of the Order of Umayyad	
Sweden	29 April 1960 – 27 July 1980	Knight (incl. Collar) of the Royal Order of the Seraphim	
Thailand	22 January 1968 – 27 July 1980	Knight of the Order of the Rajamitrabhorn	
Thailand	23 April 1968 – 27 July 1980	Knight of the Order of the Order of the Royal House of Chakri	
Tunisia	15 March 1965 – 27 July 1980	Grand Cordan of the Order of Independence	
United Kingdom	21 July 1948 – 27 July 1980	Recipient of the Royal Victorian Chain	
United States	26 November 1947 – 27 July 1980	Chief Commander of the Legion of Merit	
West Germany	27 February 1955 – 27 July 1980	Grand Cross special class of the Order of Merit of the Federal Republic	
Yugoslavia	3 June 1966 – 27 July 1980	Grand Star of the Order of the Yugoslav Star	
