= Malek Mansur Mirza Shoa as-Saltaneh =

Iranian prince (1880–1922)

Malek Mansur Mirza
- Shoa as-Saltaneh
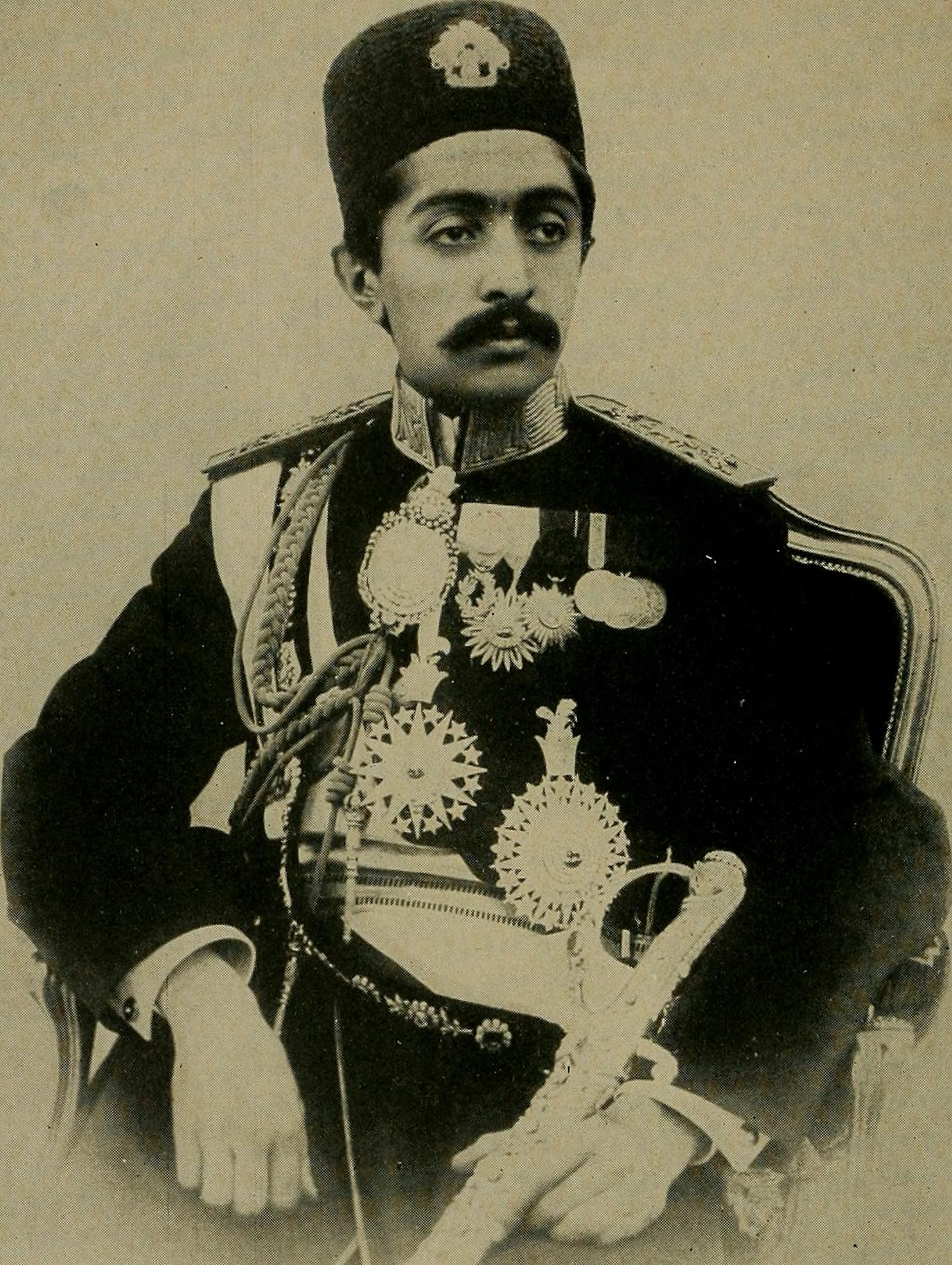
- Born: 30 March 1880; Tabriz, Qajar Iran
- Died: 6 November 1922 (aged 42); Tehran, Qajar Iran
- Spouse: Farah al-Saltaneh
- Dynasty: Qajar
- Father: Mozaffar ad-Din Shah Qajar
- Mother: Khanum Nezhat ol-Molk

Prince Malek Mansur Mirza (Persian: شاهزاده ملک منصور میرزا; 30 March 1880 – 6 November 1922) was an Iranian prince of the Qajar dynasty. He was Mozaffar ad-Din Shah Qajar's second son and a brother of Mohammad Ali Shah Qajar, Abul-fat'h Mirza Salar-ed-Dowleh and Abul-Fazl Mirza.

He was born on 30 March 1880 in Tabriz and educated by private tutors. He was governor in 1897, Governor-General of Fars 1901–1902 and 1904. He received the Decoration of the Imperial Portrait, the Neshan-e Aqdas 2nd class and Order of the Lion and the Sun 1st class from his father. He died on 6 November 1922 in Tehran.

He is the progenitor of Malek-Mansur Family.

== Honours ==
- Order of the Royal Portrait (Temsal-e-Homayoun) of Persia
- 2nd Class of the Order of Neshan-e Aqdas of Persia
- 1st Class of the Order of the Lion and the Sun of Persia
- 1st class of the Order of the Crown of Persia
- Grand cross of the Order of Leopold of Austria
- Exalted Order of Honour (Nishan-i-Ali-Imtiaz) of Turkey
