= Aryamehr =

Title used by Mohammad Reza Pahlavi of Iran

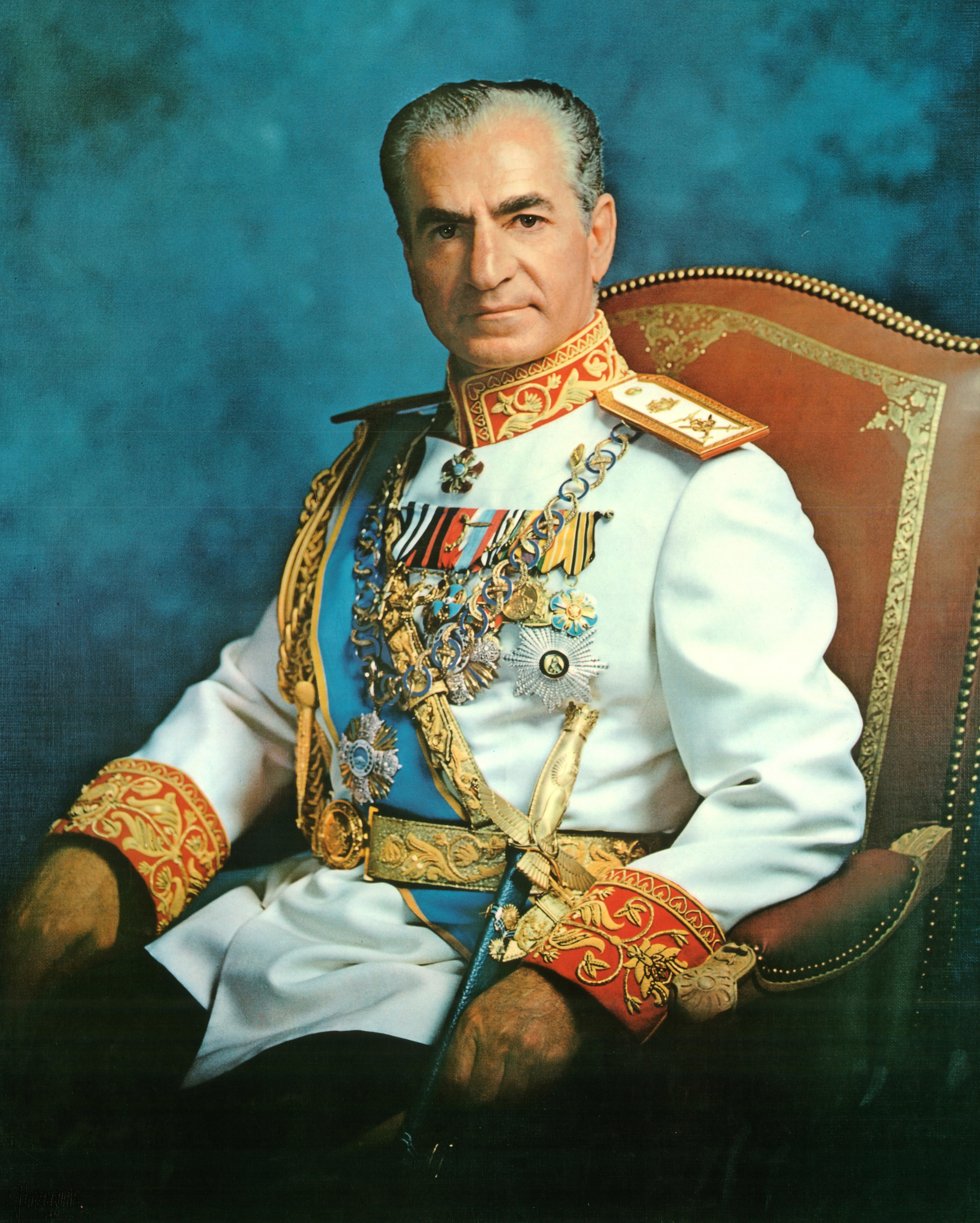
Mohammad Reza Shah in 1973

Aryamehr (Iranian Persian: آریامهر, romanized: Âryâmehr, Iranian Persian pronunciation: [ɒːɾjɒːˈmehɾ], lit. 'Light of the Aryans') was a title used in the Pahlavi era by Shah Mohammad Reza Pahlavi of Iran.

== History ==
Aryamehr was granted as a secondary title by a session of the joint Houses of Parliament (Majles) on 15 September 1965 to Mohammad Reza Pahlavi, the last Shah of Iran (reigning since he took the oath at the Majles on 17 September 1941), before his coronation at Golestan Palace on 26 October 1967. The Pahlavis used it as an idealization of pre-Islamic Iran and foundation for anti-clerical monarchism, while the clerics used it to exalt "Iranian values" vis-à-vis Westernization. Demonstrating affinity with Orientalist views of the alleged "supremacy" of the Aryan peoples and the "mediocrity" of the Semitic peoples, Iranian nationalist discourse idealized pre-Islamic Achaemenid and Sasanian empires, (Note: In a similar fashion the Shah celebrated 2,500-year celebration of the Persian Empire at Persepolis in 1971. One of his other titles was Shahanshah (lit. 'King of Kings'); Ramesh Sanghvi viewed the Shah as an heir to Darius the Great) whilst negating the Islamization of Iran during the Caliphate. Compared to the titles used by the Qajar dynasty, such as "Pivot of the Universe" and "Shadow of God", the Shah's title "Aryamehr" was less pompous in scope, despite critics ridiculing it as "grandiose and bombastic".

In 1965, the Shah ordered Mohammad Ali Mojtahedi to establish Aryamehr University of Technology. However, after the 1979 Iranian Revolution It was renamed and currently known as the Sharif University named after Majid Sharif-Vaghefi.

Things named after Aryamehr include the Aryamehr Sports Complex, the Aryamehr Stadium, and the Shahyad Aryamehr monumental gate.

== Associated order ==
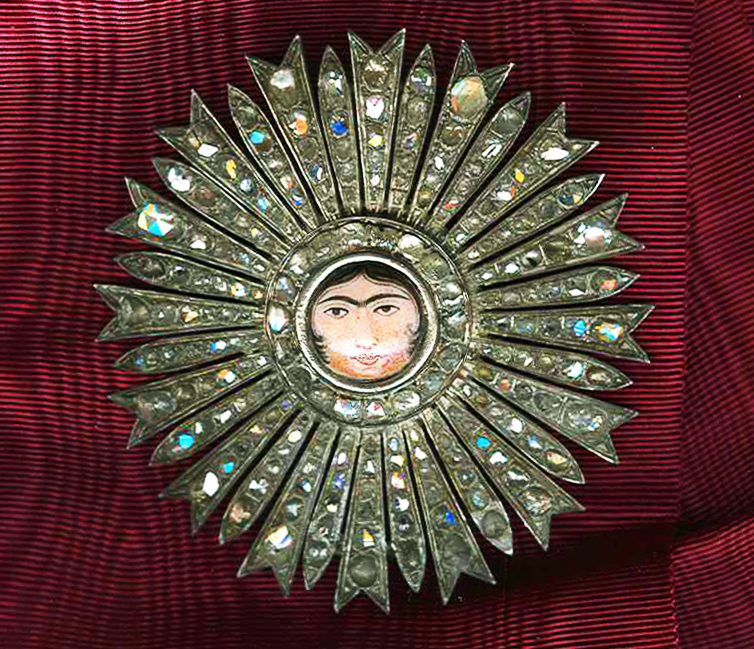
Order of Aftab. This order was transformed into Neshân-e Âryâmehr (lit. 'the order of light of the Aryans') in 1967

In 1873, Naser al-Din Shah of the Qajar dynasty established the Order of Aftab (lit. 'order of the sun'), restricted to female sovereigns or consorts (1st class) and princesses or women of high rank (2nd class). In 1939, the order was renamed Neshân-e Khorshid or Nishān-i Xwarshēd. This was then transformed into Neshân-e Âryâmehr, or Nishān-i Āryāmihr, meaning 'the Order of the Light of the Aryans'. It was the third and last imperial order of knighthood founded by the Shah on 26 September 1967 (Note: This date, given in most publications, is plausibly the date of revival, not of institution: photographs of the imperial wedding celebrations in 1939 show Queen Mother Tadj ol-Molouk wearing an almost identical star; Reza Shah may well have founded the order at the same time as the Order of Pahlavi in 1932) in honour of his consort, Empress Farah Diba, and restricted to ladies only. The first class was restricted to female Sovereigns or consorts of reigning rulers; the second class to princesses.

== See also ==
- Order of Aryamehr
