= Military Order of Oman =

Highest Omani military order

Military Order of Oman وسام عمان العسكري
- Star of the order

Awarded by Sultan of Oman
- Type: Military
- Established: 1970
- Country: Oman
- Royal house: Al Bu Sa'id
- Status: Currently constituted
- Founder: Sultan Qaboos bin Said
- Sovereign: Sultan Haitham bin Tariq
- Classes: Five

Precedence
- Next (lower): Order of the Special Royal Emblem
- Ribbon of the order

The Military Order of Oman (Arabic: وسام عمان العسكري, romanized: Wisam al-Oman al-Easkariu) is the highest military order awarded by Oman.

== History ==
The order was established in 1970 by Sultan Qaboos bin Said as a counterpart to the Civil Order of Oman. It is made up of five classes.

== Insignia ==
The insignia consists of a collar, riband, badge, and star. The ribbon is blue with red stripes depending on the class. The star has six dome shaped points in red enamel with the national emblem of Oman between each point.

Ribbon	Class
	First class
	Second class
	Third class
	Fourth class
	Fifth class

== Notable Recipients ==
=== First class ===
- King Faisal bin Abdulaziz Al Saud of Saudi Arabia
- Shah Mohammad Reza Pahlavi of Iran (1977)
- Prince Philip, Duke of Edinburgh (1979)
- King Juan Carlos of Spain (1983)

=== Second class ===
- Sheikh Mohamed bin Zayed Al Nahyan (2000)
- Major General Sheikh Saif bin Zayed Al Nahyan (2000)
- Lieutenant General Abdulrahman bin Saleh Al-Bunyan (2015)
- Lieutenant General Claudio Grasz (2015)
- Vice Admiral Abdullah bin Sultan Al Sultan (2017)
- Admiral Sir Philip Jones (2018)
- Colonel Nigel Knocker (2018)
- Major General Richard Stanford (2020)
- Major General Felix Gedney (2024)
- Major General Yousef Ahmed Al Hunaiti (2024)
- Sayyid Asa'ad bin Tariq Al Said
- Air Chief Marshal Farooq Feroze Khan
- Air Chief Marshal Tanvir Mahmood Ahmad

=== Third class ===
- Brigadier General Said bin Abdullah bin Humaid Al Hatmi (2022)
