= Khvarenah =

God of glory, splendor and fortune in Zoroastrianism

Khwarrah
- Yazata of glory, good fortune and success
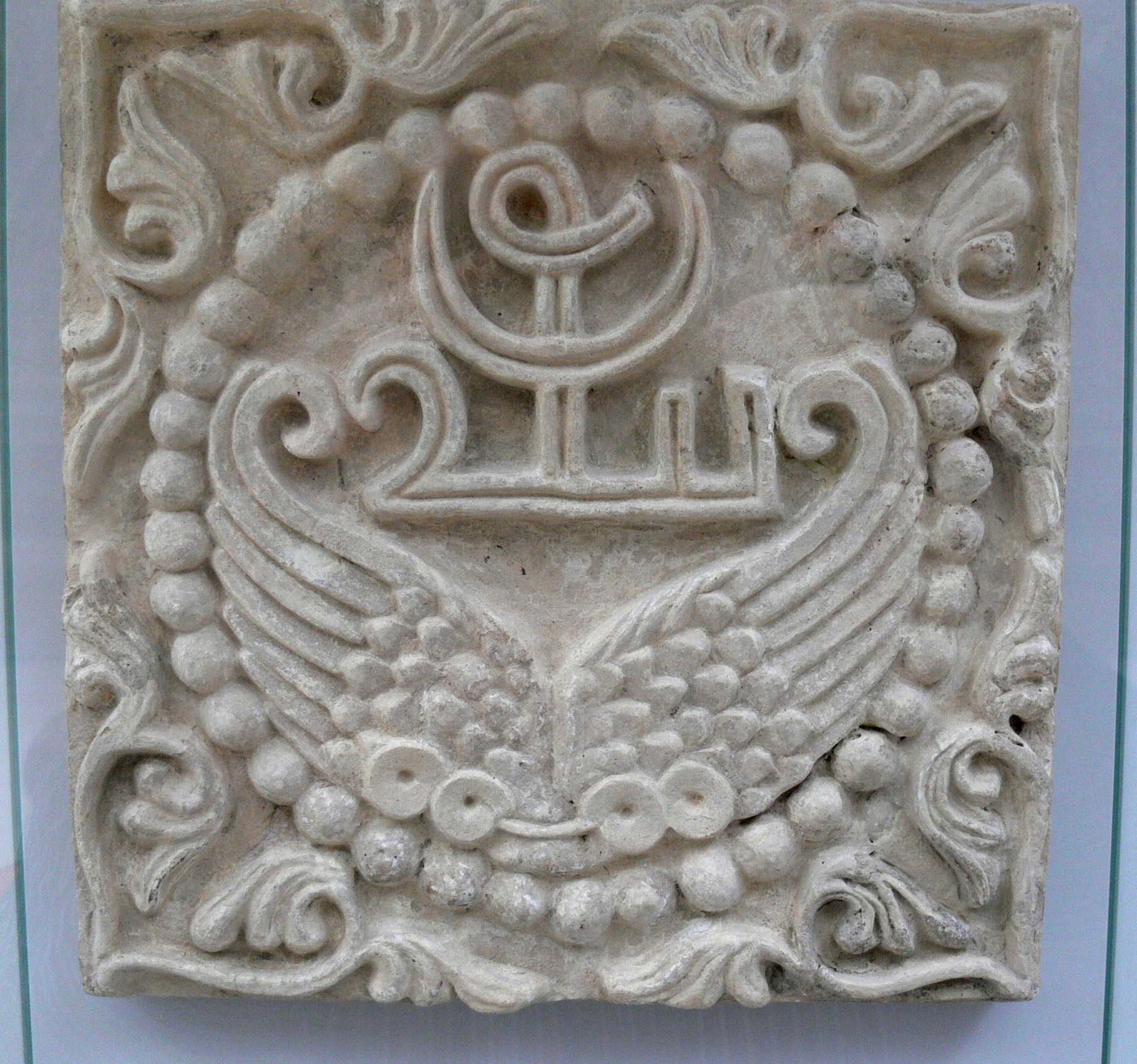
- Relief from the Sasanian period with the word Farr written in a calligraphic style of Middle Persian
- Other names: Xwarrah, Xorreh, Khorr(a), Farn, Farrah, Farr, Pharro, Khwarrah, Farnah, Khvarenah, Farr-e Izadi, Farr-e Kiyani, Farr-e Kayani
- Avestan: 𐬓𐬀𐬭𐬆𐬥𐬀𐬵
- Weapons: Sword, spear, shield (Kushan depictions)
- Animals: Huma bird, ram, eagle, falcon
- Symbols: Royal figure inside a winged disc, radiance, fire, nimbus, shoulder flames, deyhim ribbons, lotus, pearls
- Attributes: Glory, splendor, success, good fortune, victory, royal legitimacy, prosperity
- Texts: Avesta, especially Yasht 19; Kār-nāmag ī Ardaxšīr ī Pābagān
- Gender: Male
- Region: Iran, Central Asia

Khvarenah (Avestan: 𐬓𐬀𐬭𐬆𐬥𐬀𐬵, romanized: xvarənah), also spelled khwarenah, khwarrah, or xwarrah, and known in New Persian as farr or farrah, or farr-e kiyani, is a Zoroastrian magical power, concept and yazata, personifying divine glory, splendor, and good fortune in Iranian religious tradition, and served as the tutelary deity of kingship. Conceived as a radiant spiritual force and a guarantee of success, khwarrah empowers its possessors to achieve victory, prosperity, and the fulfillment of their appointed purposes. In its royal manifestation, it is a divine charisma that legitimizes kingship, bestows the power to rule, and serves as a sign of divine favor. It could accompany a rightful monarch or abandon one who had become unworthy, making its possession both a mark of royal authority and a condition of its continuation. In Zoroastrian scripture, khwarrah is personified as a yazata, a divine being worthy of worship, and is celebrated in the Avesta, particularly Yasht 19. Its powers extend beyond kingship to the preservation of the world and the successful fulfillment of the functions of gods, human beings, and nature. The legend of Jamshid, who loses his glory after departing from righteousness, illustrates its ability to pass between possessors. Closely associated with light and fire, khwarrah could manifest as a blazing radiance or assume the forms of birds and other animals

Khwarrah was a fundamental feature of Iranian royal ideology, embodying a hereditary dynastic charisma that could nevertheless be lost. Associated with the solar aspects of ancient Iranian kingship, it represented not only the powers of sovereignty but also the protective divine presence that legitimized and safeguarded the reigning monarch. Although absent by name from Achaemenid royal inscriptions, its influence has been identified in interpretations of royal investiture and kingship. Its personification was prominently represented under the Kushans, whose coins depicted khwarrah as an armed, radiant male deity, identified by the Bactrian inscription ΦΑΡΡΟ (Pharro), serving as a tutelary divinity of kings and a bestower of royal fortune. The concept remained central to Sasanian royal traditions and imagery, in which divine glory was associated with the ruler's authority, victory, and radiance.

The imagery of khwarrah has been the subject of extensive scholarly debate. Its luminous nature is reflected in representations of figures surrounded by fire or bearing flames upon their shoulders, particularly on Kushan coins. Birds of prey, especially eagles and falcons, also symbolize its presence, recalling the Avestan account in which khwarrah assumes the form of a bird upon abandoning Jamshid. Other proposed emblems include the Achaemenid winged sun disk and the ring of royal investiture, although their identification with khwarrah is subject to controversy.

The concept also influenced neighboring traditions of kingship and royal fortune, with parallels in Greek tychē basileōs and Latin fortuna regia. Such ideas circulated among the Seleucids, the dynasties of Cappadocia and Pontus, Antiochus I of Commagene, and the Kushan rulers. Following the fall of the Sasanian Empire, the traditional notion of royal glory survived in the literature, philosophy, and epics of Islamic Persia, particularly as farr-e elāhī or farr-e īzadī, the glory bestowed by God upon a sovereign. It remained associated with divine favor, legitimate rule, and the glory of Iran.

The concept of farr (khwarrah) has also been invoked in modern Iranian debates concerning legitimate and just leadership. Although the Islamic Revolution formally opposed absolute monarchy, supporters of Ruhollah Khomeini have been described as drawing upon the traditional concept of farr. According to one interpretation, Khomeini relied on the Iranian tradition of a supreme ruler endowed with a divine right to govern when he established a new form of clerical authority. This interpretation characterizes the resulting system as a new monarchical dynasty of Islamic clerics exercising absolute power.

== Etymology ==
The royal khwarrah depicted in an Achaemenid relief in Persepolis

The etymology and concept of Avestan xvarənah- (khwarrah) and its Iranian cognates have long been subjects of debate. The problems involved have been reviewed several times and are well known.

The term farr(ah) or xᵛarənah literally means "glory", according to the most likely etymology and its reconstructed semantic function across different stages of the Iranian languages. Avestan xvarənah- is probably derived from Proto-Avestan *hvar ("to shine"), nominalized with the suffix -nah. Proto-Avestan *hvar is related to Old Indic svar, both descending from Proto-Indo-Iranian *súHr̥ ("to shine") and ultimately Proto-Indo-European *sóhr ("to shine"). An alternative etymology proposed by H. W. Bailey connects Avestan xvarənah- with Persian xvardan ("to eat"), interpreting the root xvar- as "to partake, take". Bailey consequently understood khwarrah as "a thing obtained or desired", extending to "a good thing, a desirable thing, possessions, good things", and regarded it as a concrete expression concerned with the earthly world.

In most Iranian languages, the word appears with an initial f-, as in Median and Old Persian farnah-, from which Middle and New Persian farr(ah) and the adjective farrokh derive. The initial xᵛ- (hṷ-) is found in Avestan xᵛarənah- and Zoroastrian Middle Persian khwarrah, the latter giving rise to New Persian ḵorra. Despite Philippe Gignoux's doubts, khwarrah was probably also the Middle Persian form used in Sasanian inscriptions, where, as in Pahlavi, it was written with the Aramaic ideogram GDE. The difference between these forms was initially explained by a proposed Median sound law changing Proto-Iranian xᵛ- to f-, with Old Persian farnah thought to have been borrowed from Median.

Skjærvø challenged this explanation, arguing that Middle Persian khwarrah and New Persian ḵorra were borrowings from Avestan rather than inherited forms. He also considered it unlikely that an Achaemenid Old Persian form could have spread throughout the Iranian-speaking world, given the widespread occurrence of initial f- compared with the restricted distribution of xᵛ- . The Median sound-law hypothesis has since been rejected, and the Proto-Iranian form is reconstructed as *hu̯, preserved in Avestan as xᵛ- and dissimilated to f- elsewhere. In New Persian, both initial f- and hṷ- (ḵorra) continued to occur, though f- forms were more frequent in literary texts. Farr was a royal and divine attribute, described as kayānī, kayī, šāhī, šāhanšāhī, and īzadī, and occurred in expressions such as farr o awrang (farr and throne), probably derived from an ancient farnah utā abifarnangam ("endowed with majesty").

The word's wider distribution is reflected in its attestation across Iranian languages and neighboring linguistic traditions. It occurs as farnah- in Median personal names from the ninth century BCE and in Old Persian names such as Vindafarnah- ('"he who finds the farnah"), analogous to Avestan Viδaṱ.xᵛarənah-. It is also preserved in parallel Akkadian, Elamite, and Greek traditions.

Among the Middle Iranian languages, cognate forms include Sogdian farn, Bactrian far(r)o, and Khotanese phārra. The word also survives in the Digoron and Iron dialects of Ossetic as farnä and farn, respectively, meaning "peace, happiness, abundance, fortune", and reflecting a Scytho-Sarmatian and Alan cultural background. Among other New Iranian languages, it may be represented by Pashto nwar ("sun"), alongside nmar and lmar, involving dissimilation (n-m > l-m) and possibly explainable through metathesis, nasalization, or both.

== Conceptualization ==
Terracotta figure of Khwarrah

Knowledge of Avestan khwarrah derives primarily from the Yashts, particularly Yasht 19, which distinguishes two forms: kauuaēm khwarrah ("the fortune of the Kavi dynasty") and axvarətəm khwarrah. The former belongs to the gods, enabling them to create and preserve the world, while also accompanying ancient kings and heroes and endowing them with extraordinary powers. The latter is portrayed as an object of desire for divinities and heroes, who continually struggle to obtain it. In Yasht 19.53–54, Ahura Mazda instructs Zoroaster that "every mortal" (kasciṱ maš´iiānąm) should seek khwarrah to obtain advantages and success.

The powers attributed to khwarrah extended beyond kingship and material prosperity. Associated with glory, splendor, and good fortune, it was understood as an empowering force and a guarantee of success, enabling its possessors to accomplish their "own work" and fulfill their "proper function". Several Avestan passages also describe khwarrah as a magical force capable of promoting or stimulating the functions of nature and human beings, associating it with other forms of power such as ama- ("attacking strength"), aojah- ("strength"), vərəθra- ("defensive and attacking strength"), and zavar- ("physical strength") in Yasht 1.22. This notion of fulfilling one's appointed function was fundamental to Zoroastrian cosmology and ethics and was interpreted by H. H. Schaeder as equivalent to Greek autopragía.

This empowering force was also associated with particular dynasties, peoples, and religious traditions. In addition to the khwarrah of the Kayanians (Avestan kauuaēm xᵛarənō), sources refer to that of the Iranians, and to the wuzurg khwarrah ī abēzag rāst dēn, the "great khwarrah-bestowing force of the pure true religion". Its association with royal authority is further illustrated by the Paikuli inscriptions, in which the Sasanian Shahanshah Narseh and his forefathers are described as having received khwarrah and "rulership" from the gods.

Alongside these powers and associations, khwarrah is also described as possessing a luminous and fiery character in Avestan and Middle Persian sources. In Yasht 10.127, the "strong" (uγra-) xᵛarənah- of the kavīs is identified with a "blazing fire" (ātarš yōupa.suxtō) preceding Mithra's chariot. Similarly, in Gignoux's interpretation of the Ardā Wīrāz Nāmag (14.16), khwarrah "burns without interruption" (hamē waxšīd). The Pahlavi Widēwdād (1.21) also glosses bāmīg ("brilliant, glorious") as khwarrahōmand (possessing khwarrah), corresponding to the equivalence of Manichaean Middle Parthian bʾm and Manichaean Sogdian frn. Together, these attestations suggest a close connection between khwarrah, fire, and light, although the concepts are not identical. Translating khwarrah simply as "light" may therefore be misleading, since it is not interchangeable with rošnīh ("light").

Sogdian cup rendering khwarrah with the head of a ram

The relationship between glory, radiance, and fortune has also been the subject of scholarly debate concerning the precise meaning of khwarrah. Traditional interpretations regarded "glory", "splendor", "luminosity", and "shine", associated with the sun and fire, as its primary meanings, while treating prosperity, good fortune, and kingly majesty as secondary developments. H. W. Bailey challenged this interpretation, arguing that "fortune", in the sense of "good things" or "prosperity", was the original meaning. Jacques Duchesne-Guillemin and Gherardo Gnoli subsequently defended the earlier interpretation, which gained renewed scholarly support. In this view, "glory" remains the most appropriate translation, in the sense discussed by Skjærvø.

Scholars who accepted Bailey's proposed etymology also generally understood khwarrah as a magical or elemental force, proposing a semantic development from the "good things of life" through prosperity and fortune to its personification as a luminous yazata, and eventually to meanings comparable to Greek doxa ("glory") and Arabic nūr ("light"). This interpretation has been challenged, particularly where attempts to identify khwarrah with material possessions, an abstract concept, or a physical substance, such as naphtha or amber, were considered to obscure its underlying character as a magical or spiritual force.

The broader meaning of "fortune" was nonetheless also associated with khwarrah, extending beyond royal fortune to prosperity and good fortune more generally. This usage is reflected in the Aramaic ideogram GDE, employed to write the term in Sasanian inscriptions and Pahlavi books, possibly following a practice introduced during the Achaemenid period. A small silver plaque from the Foroughi collection in Tehran, dated to the mid-third century BCE, also appears to associate khwarrah with the Syrian concept of fortune, gd (gdy), through its inscription and iconography. The sense of "(good) fortune", regarded in the traditional interpretation as a secondary semantic development, is further attested in non-Iranian equivalents, including Aramaic gd, Greek tychē, Sanskrit lakṣmī and śrī, and Turkish qut.

== Origins and development ==
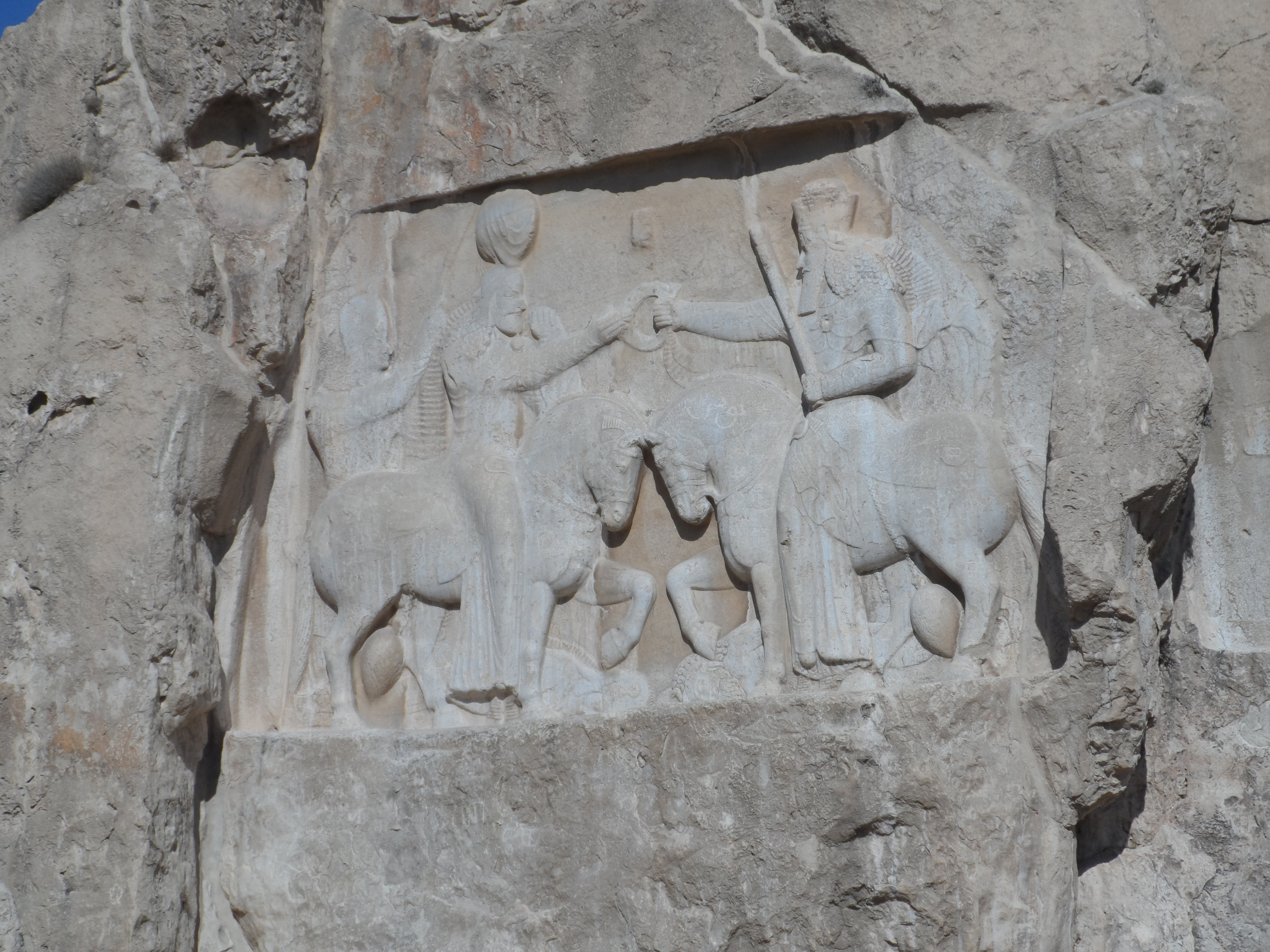
Ohrmazd (right) bestowing the ring of khwarrah upon Ardashir I

At its inception, khwarrah appears to have been a tribal concept, with parallels among the societies of the Eurasian steppes. Its association with the myth of Jamshid suggests that it was initially developed as an expression of royal authority before its incorporation into Zoroastrianism. In this early conception, khwarrah represented a form of charisma associated with kingship, which subsequently acquired a wider religious and spiritual significance.

In Zoroastrian tradition, Avestan xᵛarənah- and Pahlavi khwarrah were understood as spiritual forces existing even before the creation of the physical body or person. As both a guarantee and a sign of success, khwarrah enabled beings to fulfill their particular duties or missions, while also acquiring the meaning of good fortune. The Yasht dedicated to khwarrah (Yasht 19) presents it as a personified yazata, or divine being, and enumerates gods and mortals who accomplish their tasks through the khwarrah belonging to them (yaṱ asti + gen.) or accompanying them. This spiritual power was not limited to kings and heroes. The khwarrah of priests (āsrōnān), for instance, was described as intangible or impalpable (agrīft, agrīftar; Avestan āgərəpta-), and appears to have been acquired through knowledge (dānāgīh) and study (frahang).

The concept also formed part of Iranian traditions of kingship, although its place in Achaemenid royal ideology remains less certain. No explicit reference to khwarrah occurs in Achaemenid royal inscriptions, which instead emphasize the king's authority "by the favor of Ohrmazd" (vašnā Auramazdāha), a formula of divine investiture possibly influenced by Mesopotamian traditions. Nevertheless, elements associated with khwarrah have been identified in Achaemenid royal imagery, including the diadem offered by a winged figure, possibly Ohrmazd, in royal rock reliefs. Further traces have been proposed in the fōs of Darius III (336–331 BCE), interpreted as the king's luminous charisma, the individual "fire" of each sovereign, and the golden eagle said to accompany divine and royal chariots.

Khwarrah on the inverse of a Kushan coin

During the Hellenistic period, the Kayanian conception of khwarrah became increasingly associated with broader ideas of royal fortune through the interaction of Iranian and neighboring religious traditions. Its personified form subsequently received a distinctive visual expression under the Kushans. On Kushan coinage, the Bactrian Farr or Pharro appeared as a male deity in anthropomorphic form, preceding the earliest Sasanian attestations. Although its representation as a masculine being had precedents in the Avesta, where royal glory could assume the forms of eagles, rams, and other male animals and birds, the Kushan portrayal marked an important difference from earlier Avestan and Middle Iranian representations by depicting the deity in human form.

Under the Sasanians, khwarrah continued to serve as a sign of divinely sanctioned kingship, with particular emphasis on the ruler's radiance. According to Soudavar, Sasanian royal ideology employed the expression kē čihr az yazdān, interpreted as "whose radiance comes from the gods", to convey the idea that the king reflected divine power and glory. In this interpretation, čihr represented the visible manifestation of khwarrah, allowing the king's radiance to express his possession of divine glory.

The concept survived the decline of Zoroastrian political authority and continued to influence Islamic Persian ideas of kingship. Older Iranian traditions of God-given sovereignty were adapted to Islamic understandings of justice, legitimate government, and the responsibilities of rulers, persisting through Persian literature, historical writing, and political advice literature (siyāsatnāma). Within this broader continuity of Iranshahri political thought, the notion of farr-e īzadī, or divinely bestowed glory, remained an important expression of royal authority. Its spiritual dimensions also found new interpretations in the philosophical and religious traditions of Islamic Persia.

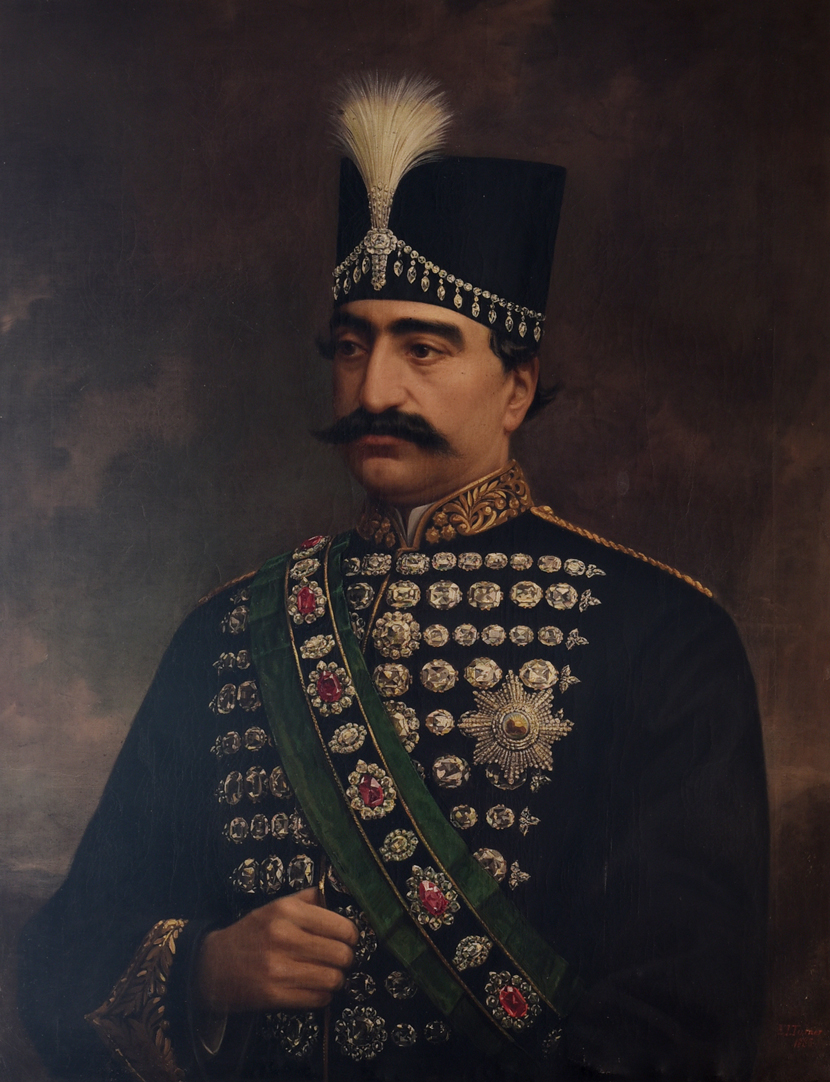
Nasereddin Shah Qajar - Famously bearing the epithet zill Allah

In this later tradition, kingship was portrayed as a divine gift bestowed upon an individual chosen by God, drawing upon the concept of ẓill Allāh (Persian: ظل الله, "the shadow of God") and the mythical bird Huma, whose shadow brings fortune and kingship to the person upon whom it falls. The image, also found in Persian mystical literature such as Attar's Manṭiq al-Ṭayr, expressed the dependence of royal authority upon divine favor: just as a shadow depends upon the object casting it, the ruler's authority was understood to derive from a higher source rather than from the individual himself. In this interpretation, older Iranian traditions of divinely sanctioned kingship were brought together with Islamic ideas of divine vicegerency (khalīfat Allāh) and spiritual development. The association of farr with divine light also acquired a wider mystical significance, particularly in interpretations connected with Suhrawardī, in which illumination, divine favor, and rightful authority were closely related.

Kingship was further understood as a spiritual responsibility rather than an unconditional right to govern. Political authority could enable a ruler to serve God, establish justice, and cultivate virtue, but could also lead to arrogance, selfishness, and tyranny. Drawing upon the example of the Pharaoh, whose worldly power led him to claim divine authority, divine appointment did not itself guarantee righteous conduct. The king was therefore required to govern justly, resist his own desires, and use his position as a means of spiritual development.

== Iconography ==
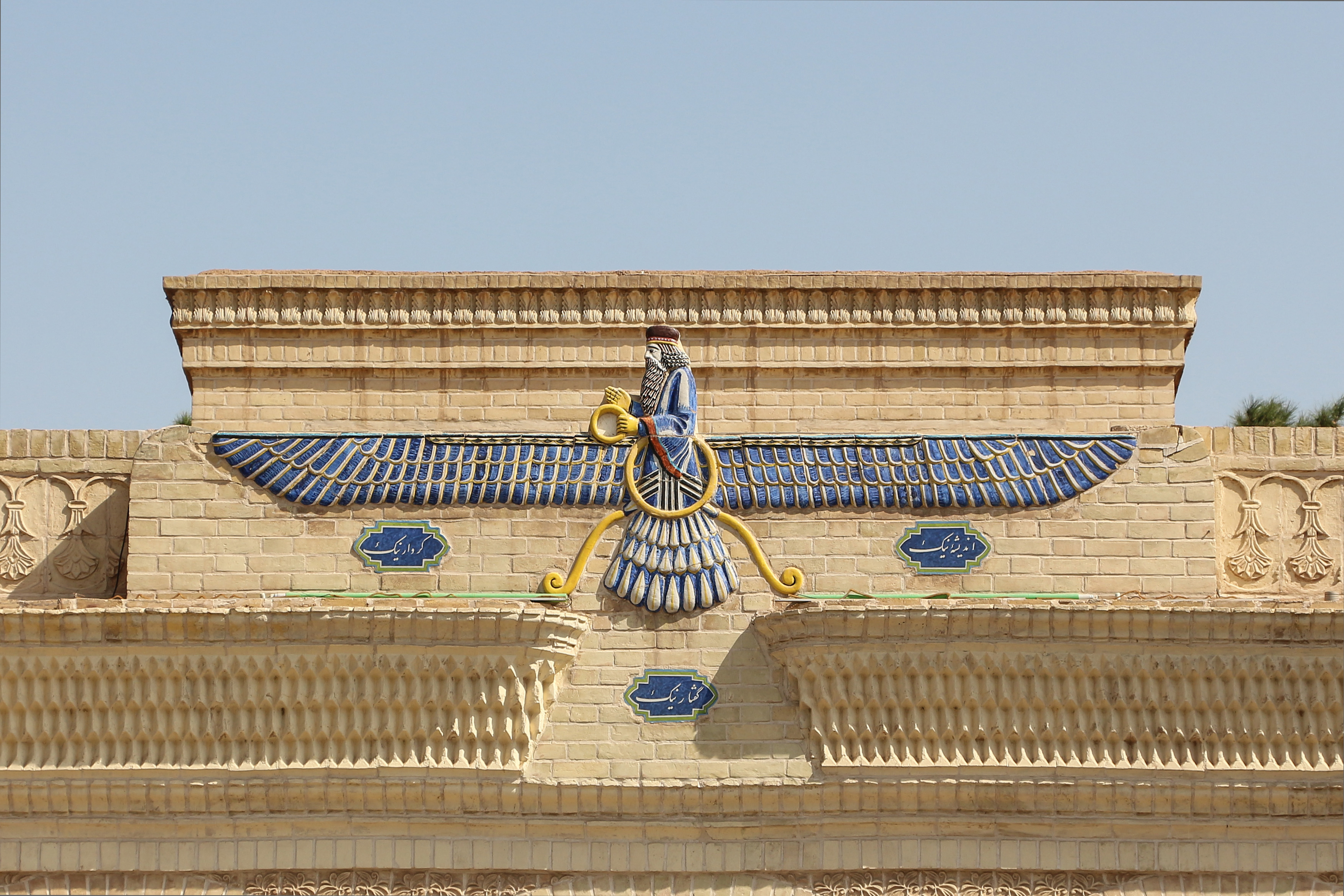
Achaemenid symbol of the Farr-e Kiyani/royal Khwarrah on the entrance of a Zoroastrian temple in Yazd

The winged emblem commonly known as the Farr-e Kiyani is among the most prominent symbols associated with khwarrah, although its identification remains disputed. Its origins lie in the winged sun disk of ancient Egypt and Mesopotamia, transmitted into Iranian royal iconography through Assyrian traditions. Under Darius I, the prominence of Ohrmazd (Ahura Mazdā) brought changes to Achaemenid imagery. According to Soudavar, two related emblems were employed: a bearded figure within a winged ring, modeled after representations of the Assyrian god Ashur, and a modified Egyptian winged disk representing khwarrah. Their visual similarity was intended to establish Ohrmazd as the source of royal glory, reflected in the transition from the squared Mesopotamian wings at Bisotun to the rounded Egyptian-style wings at Persepolis.

Historically, these emblems have variously been identified as Ohrmazd, fravahars (fravashi), or manifestations of khwarrah, interpreted as representations of Kayanian and Iranian glory respectively, but Lecoq challenged this distinction. The interaction between the bearded figure and the king supports its identification as Ohrmazd, whereas the uninhabited winged disk has been interpreted as representing khwarrah itself. The emblem later became an important religious and cultural symbol among Zoroastrians and other Iranians, particularly through its revival under the Pahlavi dynasty and its continued use among Iranian communities.

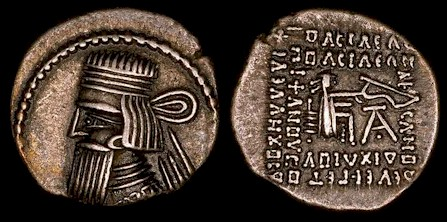
Coin of Artabanus II of Parthia - example of Arsacid-style diadem

During the Hellenistic and Parthian periods, Iranian representations of khwarrah incorporated elements from Greek and Roman imagery. Under the Sasanians, diadems and flying ribbons became prominent symbols of divine glory and royal investiture, possibly developing in part from the double diadem of Arsacid rulers. Soudavar interpreted the windblown ribbons of Shapur I as expressions of Iranian khwarrah, associated with victory and the Strong Wind in Yasht 18.2. The ribbon, or dastār, was also connected with the granting of victory, reinforced by the use of the same Pahlavi ideogram for khwarrah and dast. This association persisted into the Islamic period, when Mas'udi described a ribboned ram as ḵarrah va ḡorm ("khwarrah and ram"). The imagery of divine glory also took luminous forms. Fire could embody or contain khwarrah, which was represented artistically by its radiance through circular nimbuses (halos) and shoulder flames. These conventions continued in sixth- to eighth-century Sogdia, where kings and heroes were depicted with halos or shoulder flames, and deities with flaming nimbuses.

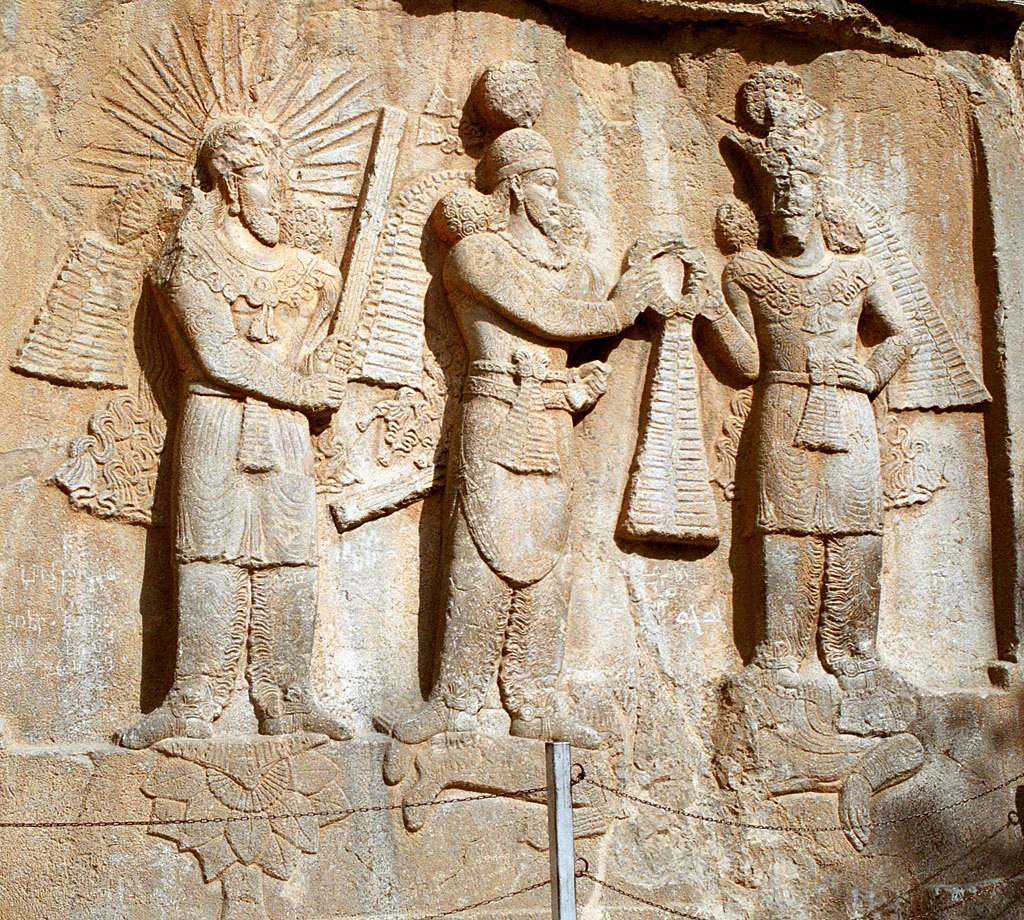
Ohrmazd bestowing the ring of khwarrah to Ardashir II - Mithra (left) stands on a lotus flower

Other symbols of khwarrah included flowers, pearls, and auspicious combinations of motifs. Soudavar traces the sunflower and lotus to Median royal ideology, associating them with Mithra and Apam Napat as representations of the active and dormant states of khwarrah. The Bundahišn identifies the sunflower (hamišeh-bahār) with Mithra, while the lotus was associated with aquatic divinities. In Soudavar's interpretation of the Sasanian relief at Tāq-e Bostān, Mithra standing upon a lotus symbolized the bestowal of Iranian khwarrah in connection with victory over Julian the Apostate. Pearls and spherical roundels similarly represented khwarrah, as suggested by Susa brick panels depicting them amid swirling waters, while three-dot motifs sometimes interpreted as pearls appeared on crowns and textiles. Such emblems were frequently multiplied or combined to express farrah afzun ("may khwarrah be increased"), a wish for greater glory, fortune, and power. This was conveyed through repeated symbols, inscriptions, and hand gestures, notably the lotus held between the extended thumb and index finger, representing the number ten thousand and expressing a wish for abundant khwarrah.

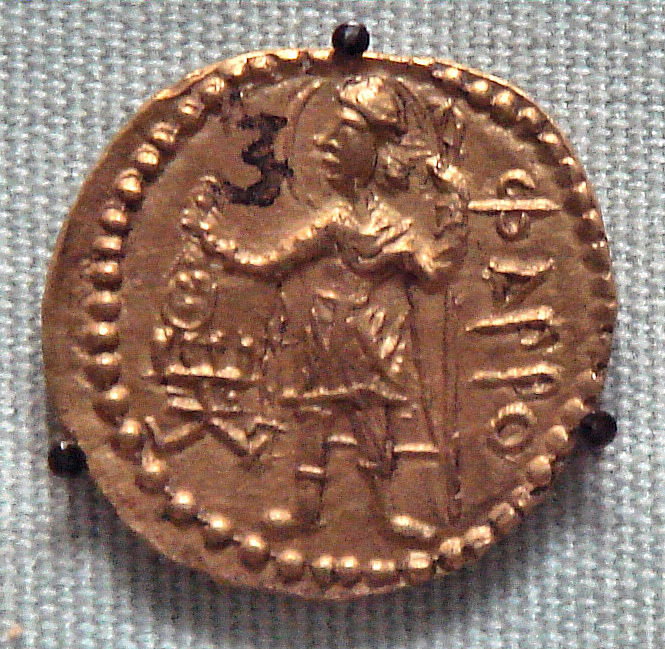
Kushan depiction of khwarrah holding a purse that represents wealth

The personification of khwarrah also found expression in human and animal forms. On Kushan coins, khwarrah (Bactrian: Pharro; ΦΑΡΡΟ) appeared as an armed male figure, sometimes wearing a bird-crested helmet and carrying a sword, shield, lance, purse, or fire bowl. On coins of Huvishka, he could be depicted with a bent forefinger and sheathed sword, or carrying a purse, possibly influenced by Greek representations of Hermes and reflecting his association with wealth and abundance. His nimbus and shoulder flames resembled those of the distinctly represented deity Azar (Bactrian: Aθšo), whose decreasing appearance on later coinage has been interpreted as evidence of khwarrah's growing prominence. Animal representations likewise drew upon Avestan traditions, particularly the eagle or falcon associated with khwarrah in the legend of Jamshid. In the Kār-nāmag ī Ardaxšīr, royal glory accompanies Ardashir in the form of a ram, traditionally read as warrag. The work also recounts an eagle associated with Ardashir's royal fortune and a bird that saves him from poisoning.

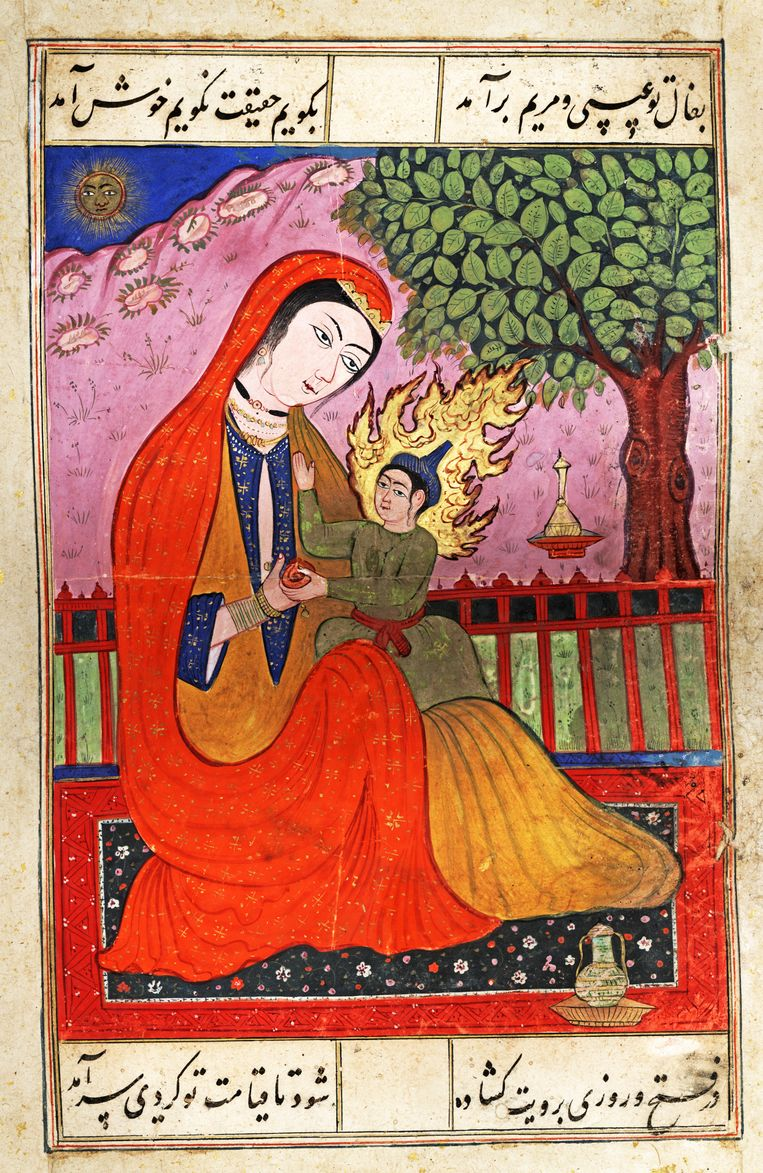
Depiction of baby Jesus burning with khwarrah on a Persian miniature

The imagery of khwarrah continued into the Islamic period, particularly in Persian literature, where numerous allusions in the Shahnameh preserved its traditional symbolism. Its visual use at Perso-Islamic courts, however, became limited and sporadic, often surviving through literary metaphors. The poet Suzani Samarqandi, for instance, likened a ruler's turban (dastār) to the ribbons of Sasanian kingship, interpreting its two flowing ends as symbols of victory and triumph. Although such imagery may have declined partly because of religious conservatism, it experienced a revival under the Mughal emperor Akbar, whose vizier Abul-Fazl Allami made farr (khwarrah) central to royal ideology. The ruler's divine glory was consequently represented by a radiant nimbus (shamsa), a convention that briefly influenced Safavid portraiture under Shah Soleyman. Another enduring expression was the flaming halo or shoulder flames associated with Islamic holy figures, possibly continuing earlier traditions in which Zoroaster's khwarrah descended from heaven and manifested in the form of fire.

== In scripture and mythology ==
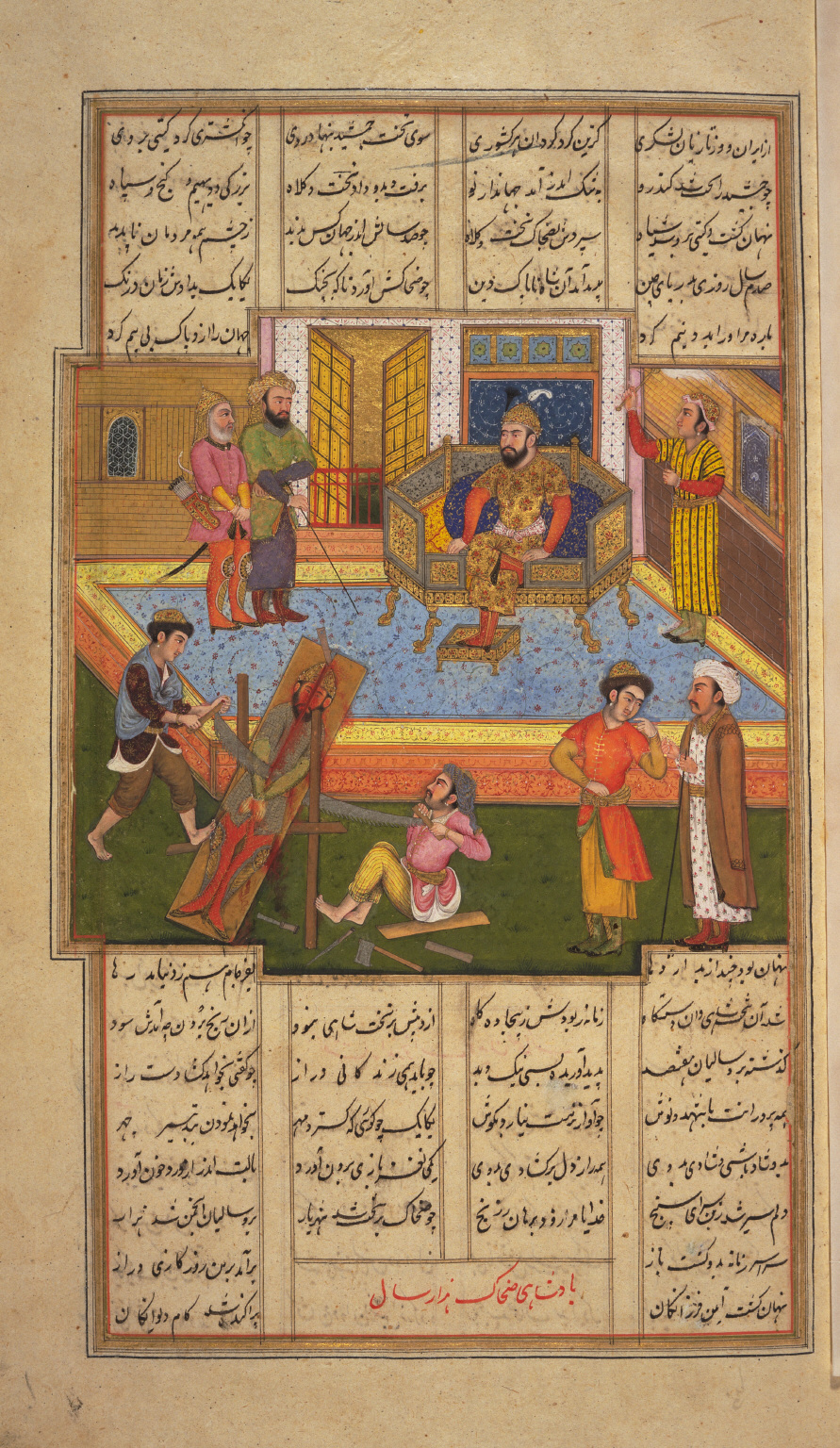
Jamshid being sawed in half by Zahhak after losing his khwarrah - Shahnameh of Ferdowsi

The earliest reference to khwarrah in Zoroastrian scripture occurs in Yasna 51.18 of the Gathas, where it appears to signify royal glory. Its principal mythological accounts, however, are preserved in the Yashts, particularly Yasht 19, the Zamyād Yasht, which celebrates khwarrah as a yazata worthy of worship. The hymn recounts how divine glory accompanies the gods and legendary rulers, beginning with Ahura Mazda (Yasht 19.9–13), the Amesha Spentas (19.14–20), and other yazatas (19.21–24), before passing to ancient heroes and the Kayanian kings. Among its recipients are Haošiiaŋha, Taxma Urupi, Yima, Haosrava, Zoroaster, Vīštāspa, and ultimately the victorious Saoshyant Astvaṱ.ərəta, who will participate in the final renovation of the world.

The central narrative illustrating the nature of farr (khwarrah) is the myth of Jamshid (Avestan Yima), whose possession of divine glory enables him to rule the world. When he departs from the righteous path, however, his khwarrah abandons him on three occasions, passing respectively to Mithra, Thraētaona, and Kərəsāspa (Yasht 19.30–44). In the wider myth, khwarrah assumes the form of a falcon (varəγna) and eventually passes into the protection of Apam Napat, who conceals it in the waters of Lake Vourukasha. There it becomes the object of a struggle involving Azar and Aži Dahāka, associated respectively with the opposing forces of Spənta Mainyu and Ahriman (Yasht 19.45–52). The legend illustrates the impermanence of royal glory: khwarrah may be forfeited through unrighteous conduct, and in its dormant state is concealed beneath the waters until it emerges to empower another possessor.

The association of khwarrah with water extends beyond the legend of Jamshid. In Yasht 19, it is linked to the world-sea Vourukasha (19.51, 56–57) and the Helmand River (19.66 ff.), while the waters of Ardvisur are invoked to bestow radiance and glory in Yasna 68.11. Its role also appears in the cosmic distribution of rainfall: according to the sequence described by Kellens, Tir secures the celestial waters, Satavaesa drives their vapors toward the earth, and the wind gathers the clouds. Apam Napat and khwarrah then distribute the waters among the regions, allowing the Fravashis to bring forth rain. Similarly, Yasht 13.14–16 attributes the flowing of waters, growth of plants, movement of winds and celestial bodies, childbirth, and human prosperity to the rayi and farnah (khwarrah) of the Fravashis.

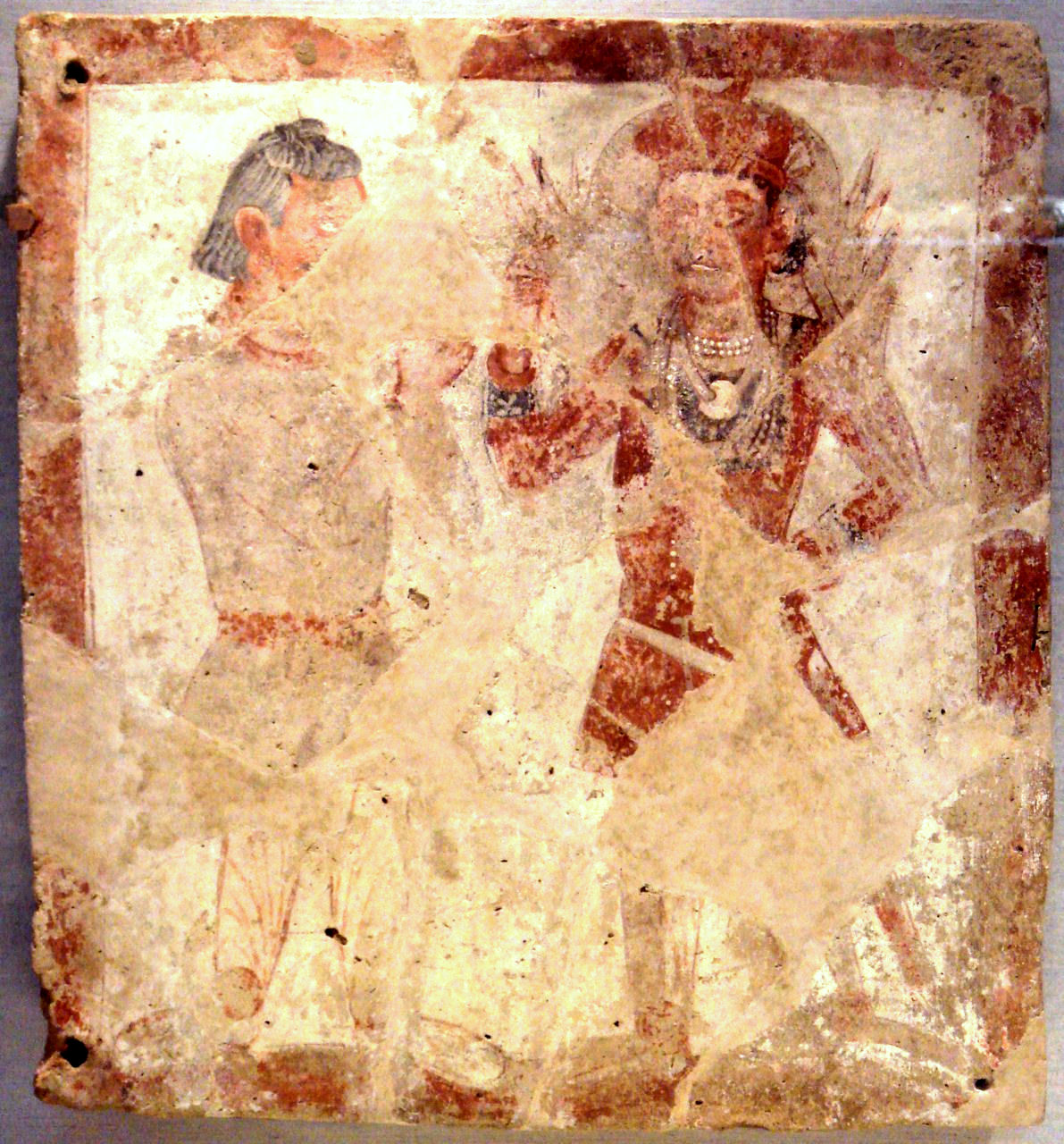
Bactrian rendition of khwarrah (right) and a worshipper

Its fiery character is equally prominent in accounts of sacred power and the prophet Zoroaster. Middle Persian tradition identifies a heavenly khwarrah residing within the sacred Bahram fire, where it is described as dwelling like a householder ruling over his house. Zoroaster's own khwarrah is likewise said to have descended from heaven and manifested itself "in the form of fire" (pad ātaxš ēwēnag) at his birth. Associated with Haoma in traditions concerning the prophet's birth, khwarrah thus combines fiery and life-generating qualities. Its sacred significance also appears in prayer and ritual: Yasna 60.2 requests prosperity, power, and glory for the household, while Mithra is described as a dispenser of khwarrah. Some interpretations further associate farnah with the offering of divine nourishment and the transmission of sacred power through ritual communion, although this explanation primarily concerns its relationship with rayi.

The passage of royal glory from one ruler to another reappears in the Middle Persian Kār-nāmag ī Ardaxšīr ī Pābagān, which recounts the rise of Ardashir I, founder of the Sasanian dynasty. Having escaped the court of the Arsacid ruler Ardavan with his treasure and favored concubine, Ardashir is pursued by the king's forces. During the pursuit, an enormous ram appears and follows the fleeing prince. Ardavān's advisers explain that the animal embodies the royal khwarrah, which has abandoned the Arsacids and is passing to Ardashir; once it reaches him, his victory is assured. Another episode depicts a bird, identified in some interpretations with royal glory and in later tradition with Ādur Farnbāg, saving Ardashir from a poisoned drink. These accounts preserve the older Avestan theme of khwarrah as a divine power that accompanies a rightful ruler and signifies the transfer of kingship.

The divine and protective role of khwarrah also persisted in later Iranian and Central Asian traditions. A Sogdian Manichaean tale recounts how a thief attempted to disguise himself as khwarrah in order to deceive a universal monarch named Kysr ("Caesar"). Although the account is incomplete, its resemblance to a legend recorded by Xuanzang concerning a divine guardian king at Kapisa has been interpreted as evidence for the continuing association of khwarrah with the protection of kings in ninth- or tenth-century Central Asia. This protective role reflects a broader scriptural theme in which possession of khwarrah secures divine favor and enables the fulfillment of one's appointed role, while its loss marks the withdrawal of that support.

== Syncretism and cultural influence ==
The concept of khwarrah influenced neighboring traditions of divine kingship and royal fortune. During the Hellenistic and Roman periods, the Iranian notion of hereditary royal charisma, which could nevertheless be lost, became associated with Greek tychē basileōs and Latin fortuna regia, concepts of royal fortune reflected in the traditions of the Seleucid, Arsacid, and Kushan rulers. These developments occurred alongside the circulation of the Mesopotamian concept of fortune, Aramaic gd(y), whose resemblance to khwarrah suggests possible mutual influence. Conversely, its association with the luminous power of kingship also has parallels in the Indo-Iranian inheritance, particularly Indic tejas, denoting the splendor and power of light and fire.

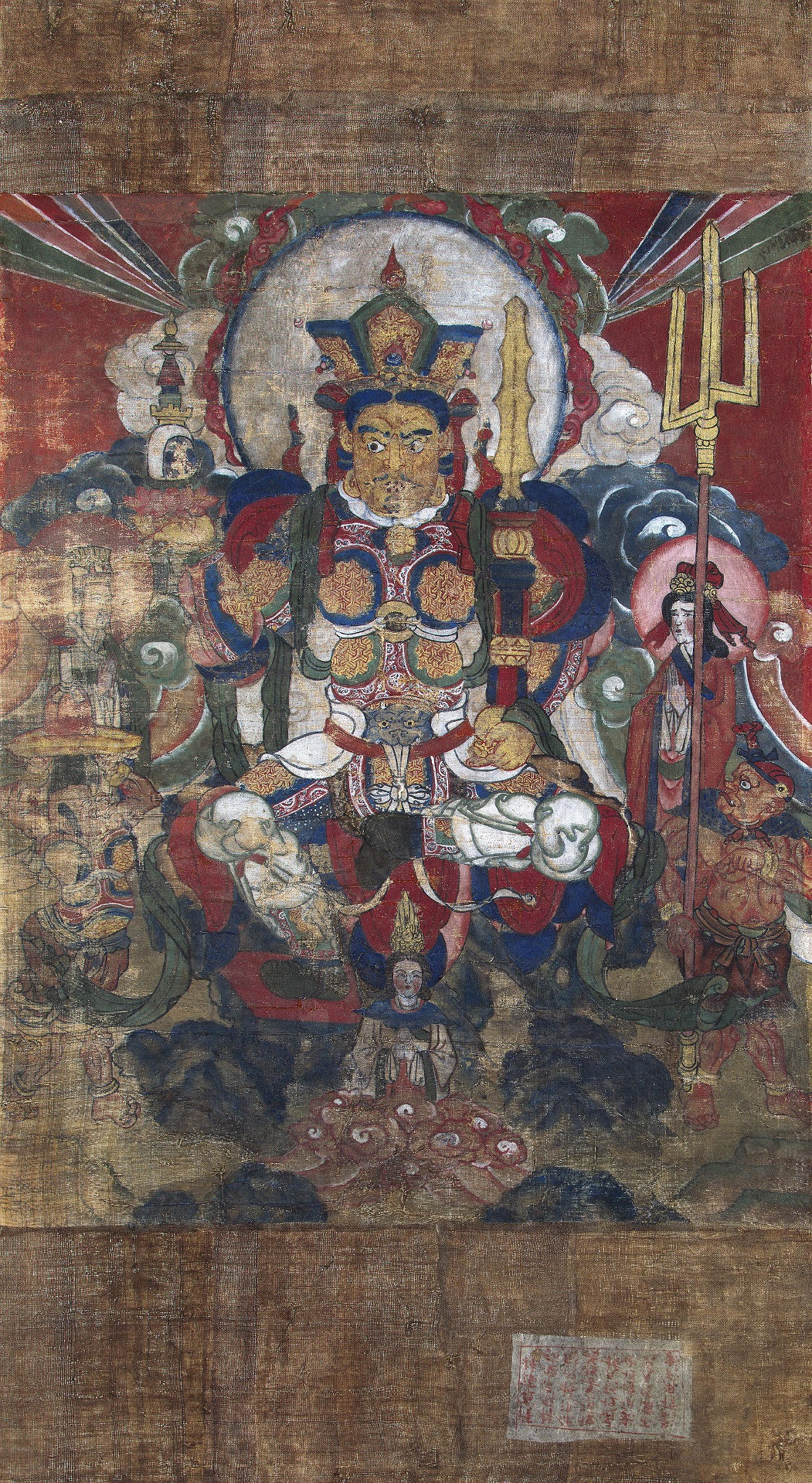
Painting of the deity Vaistravana

The concept also spread through linguistic and religious exchange. In Armenian, the borrowed term pʿaṙkʿ acquired meanings including "glory", "honor", "celebrity", possibly "fortune", and, through its use in translating Greek doxa, "opinion". Related forms are also reflected in Georgian royal tradition, particularly in names such as Pharnavaz, Pharnajom, and Pharasmanes, while accounts of the Pharnavazid dynasty associate divinely granted royal glory with the legitimacy and fate of kings. In Buddhist Sogdian and Khotanese, farn and pharra developed the meaning of a Buddha's dignity or exalted position, which subsequently passed into Tocharian. In Manichaean Sogdian, frn ("luck") designated the first of the five luminaries, corresponding to Syriac haunā, Parthian bʾm, Turkish qut, and Chinese xiàng. It also appeared in expressions for religious glory, such as Sogdian δynyfrn, Parthian δyn frh, and Turkish qutï.

A further proposed development occurred through the interaction of Iranian and Buddhist traditions in Central Asia. Phyllis Granoff suggested that the khwarrah in the Kushan tradition, embodying Iranian royal glory and associated with protection, wealth, and abundance, contributed to a composite divine figure incorporating the Indian deities Pāñcika, Kubera, and Vaiśravaṇa. She identified this composite as a possible prototype of Tobatsu Bishamon, whose cult may have developed from Central Asian associations with divine kingship into a protective and prosperity-granting tradition in China and Japan. The proposed connection is particularly reflected in shared attributes such as military dress, a bird-crested helmet, and the role of the deity as a guardian and giver of wealth.

== In culture ==
- The 1995 Ossetian film "ФАРН" (en:Farn) produced for North Ossetian Television by Murat Dzhusoyty.

== See also ==
- Celtic leaf-crown
- Kut (mythology)
- Senmurv
- Shekinah
