= Order of the Pleiades =

Order of the Pleiades may refer to:

- Order of the Pleiades (Iran), a 1955 founded all-female order of the former Imperial State of Iran
- Order of La Pléiade, a 1976 created award of the Francophonie, an international organization that promotes the ties among all French-speaking nations
