= Order of Aryamehr =

Awarded by Head of the Iranian Imperial Family
- Type: Dynastic order
- Royal house: House of Pahlavi
- Sovereign: Crown Prince Reza

Precedence
- Next (higher): Order of Pahlavi
- Next (lower): Order of Aqdas
- Ribbon

The Order of Aryamehr (Persian: نشان آریامهر, romanized: Neshān-e Āryāmehr, lit. 'Order of the Light of the Aryans') was one of the orders of honor of Iran during the Pahlavi monarchy.

In 1873, Naser al-Din Shah of the Qajar dynasty established the Order of Aftab (order of the sun) restricted to female sovereigns or consorts (1st class) and princess ladies or women of high rank (2nd class). In 1939, the order was renamed Order of Khorshid (Nishan-e Khorshid). This was then transformed into Order of Aryamehr (Neshān-e Āryāmehr, Nešâne Āryāmehr or Nishān-i Āryāmehr). It was the third and last imperial order of knighthood founded by Mohammad Reza Shah on 26 September 1967 (Note: This date, given in most publications, is plausibly the date of revival, not of institution: photographs of the imperial wedding celebrations in 1939 show Queen Mother Tadj ol-Molouk wearing an almost identical star; Reza Shah may well have founded the order at the same time as the Order of Pahlavi in 1932) in honour of his consort, Empress Farah Diba, and restricted to ladies only. The first class was restricted to female Sovereigns or consorts of reigning rulers, the second class to princesses.

== Design ==
The order had two classes (First Class and Second Class). The First Class insignia consisted of a star in the shape of the sun, with sixteen large rays and smaller rays placed between them. The sun was made of platinum and decorated with brilliant-cut diamonds. Each ray radiated outward around a central circle. In the center of the circle was the Pahlavi Crown, made of gold and set with a single brilliant diamond. The Second Class insignia featured a sun made of white gold, while the crown did not contain a diamond. The overall design gave the decoration the appearance of a sun, reflecting its title, "Aryamehr", meaning "Light of the Aryans", "Aryan Sun", or the light and radiance of the Iranian people.

== Purpose ==
The order was established in honor of the National Consultative Assembly on the occasion of the conferral of the title Aryamehr upon Mohammad Reza Pahlavi. As one of the royal family orders, it was also awarded to the women of the royal family. The First Class was awarded to the Empress (Shahbanu), while the Second Class of the Order of Aryamehr was awarded to the Shah's daughters. Following the 1979 Iranian Revolution, the order lost its official status and was abolished.
