= Order of the Red Lion and the Sun =

Iranian state award of the Pahlavi dynasty

Awarded by Head of the Iranian Imperial Family
- Type: Dynastic Order
- Royal house: House of Pahlavi
- Sovereign: Crown Prince Reza of Iran
- Grades: Knight/Dame Grand Cordon, Knight/Dame Grand Officer, Knight/Dame Commander, Knight/Dame Officer, Knight/Dame, Medal

Precedence
- Next (higher): Order of the Crown; Order of the Pleiades
- Next (lower): Order of Zolfaghar

Order of the Red Lion and the Sun (Persian: نشان شیر و خورشید سرخ) was established during the reign of Mohammad Reza Shah Pahlavi by the Iranian Red Lion and the Sun Society. This order is bestowed in order to give recognition for humanitarian services rendered in the interests of the Iranian people and for the saving of life.

The order consists of a white disc with the emblem of the Iranian Red Lion and the Sun society surrounded with golden arrays and a red cross behind it, representing the Red Cross Society.

This order was in use until the revolution of 1979.

== See also ==
- Lion and Sun
- Order of the Lion and the Sun
