= Order of Aftab =

Iranian royal order

Order of Aftab نشان آفتاب
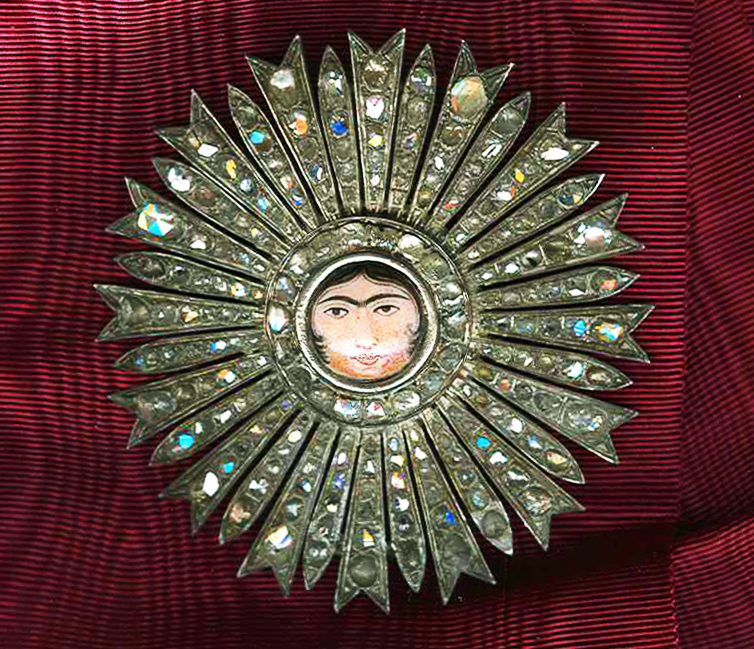
- Star of the Order

Awarded by Head of the Iranian Imperial Family
- Type: Dynastic order
- Royal house: House of Qajar
- Founder: Naser al-Din Shah Qajar
- Grades: Knight Grand Cordon

Precedence
- Next (lower): Order of Aqdas
- The Ribbon of the Order

The Order of Aftab (Persian: نشان آفتاب, romanized: Neshan-e Aftab), also known as the Order of the Sun, was a decoration founded by Naser al-Din Shah Qajar, the Shah of Iran, in February 1873, before his first visit to various European states. The order came in two classes, the first class restricted to female sovereigns or consorts of reigning rulers and the second class to princesses and ladies of high rank, and those deserving of special recognition or signs of conspicuous appreciation by the Shah. In 1967, during the reign of Mohammad Reza Shah, the statutes governing the order were revised. The changes included renaming it the Order of Aryamehr, redesigning its insignia, and revising the eligibility criteria for receiving the order.

== First Class insignia ==
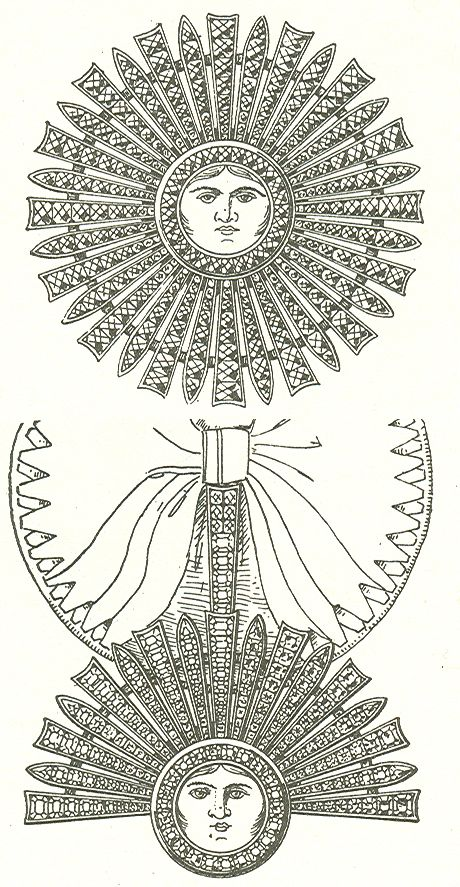
Juwel en star

The insignia of the first class consists of a breast star, sash, and sash badge. The badge is a round disk in platinum, bearing a full-face image of a female sun (aftab), fully enameled in natural colours and surrounded by a narrow raised band of platinum. The platinum band garlanded by a wide circlet completely encrusted in eighteen diamonds, edged by a further narrow raised band in platinum. Around the top half of the platinum band, a sunburst arranged in a fan-like design of seventeen separate rays, eight with tips shaped like Gothic arches and nine swallows tails, all completely encrusted in diamonds. Attached to the uppermost ray of the sunburst, a tie-ring encrusted in brilliants.

The breast star of the first class is very similar to the badge, but larger, and consists of a sunburst with thirty-two separate rays, all encrusted in diamonds and completely surrounding the central disk with its wide platinum band and circlet of diamonds.

Recipients of the first class wore the badge suspended from a grand cordon of pink moiré, edged with narrow border stripes of green, pink, and green. The sash draped over the left shoulder and across the breast, with the badge resting below the right hip.

== Second Class insignia ==
The insignia of the second class also consists of breast star, sash and sash badge. The badge is similar to the first class but in enamel and brilliants, instead of diamonds. Unlike the first class, the breast star of the second class is a closer copy of the badge, but with pendant diamonds from the two horizontal lower arms. The sunburst is semicircular with seventeen rays, surrounding only the top half of the central disk with its wide platinum band and circlet of diamonds.

Recipients of the second class wore the badge suspended from the same grand cordon, and in the same manner, as those of the first class.

== Replacement ==
Following the fall of the Qajar dynasty and during the reign of Reza Shah Pahlavi, this order was replaced by the Order of Khorshid (another Persian word for 'Sun') in 1939. This was then transformed into Neshān-e Āryāmehr, Nešâne Āryāmehr or Nishān-i Āryāmehr, meaning 'the Order of the Light of the Aryans'. It was the third and last imperial order of knighthood founded by Mohammad Reza Shah Pahlavi on 26 September 1967 (Note: This date, given in most publications, is plausibly the date of revival, not of institution: photographs of the imperial wedding celebrations in 1939 show Queen Tadj ol-Molouk wearing an almost identical star; Reza Shah may well have founded the order at the same time as the Order of Pahlavi in 1932) in honour of his consort, Empress Farah Diba, and restricted to ladies only. The first class was restricted to female Sovereigns or consorts of reigning rulers, the second class to princesses.
