= Order of Aqdas =

Iranian royal order

- Star of the Order

Awarded by Head of the Iranian Imperial Family
- Type: Dynastic Order
- Royal house: House of Pahlavi
- Sovereign: Crown Prince Reza of Iran
- Grades: Knight Grand Cordon, Knight Grand Officer, Knight Grand Commander

Precedence
- Next (higher): Order of Aftab
- Next (lower): Order of the Lion and the Sun
- Grand Cordon Grand Officer Grand Commander; The 3 ribbon bars of the Order

The Order of Aqdas (Persian: نشان اقدس, romanized: Neshan-e Aqdas, lit. 'Imperial Order or Most Sacred Order') was an imperial Iranian order founded in 1870 by Naser al-Din Shah Qajar. There were three classes, with two different styles for Iranians (Sardar) and foreigners (Nishan). The Order was dissolved upon the collapse of the Qajar dynasty.

The three classes were:

- Aqdas (Most Sacred, 1st class)
- Qods (Very Sacred, 2nd class)
- Moqaddas (Sacred, 3rd class)

== Recipients ==
- Ahmad Shah Qajar
- Amanullah Khan
- Edward VII
- Khazʽal Ibn Jabir
- Kamran Mirza Nayeb es-Saltaneh
- Malek Mansur Mirza Shoa O-Saltaneh
- Mass'oud Mirza Zell-e Soltan
- Officers
  - Reza Khan Mirpanj, Sardar-e-Aqdas
  - Sheikh Khaz'al Khan, Sardar-e-Aqdas

== Galery ==
Naser al-Din Shah Qajar

Victor Emmanuel III

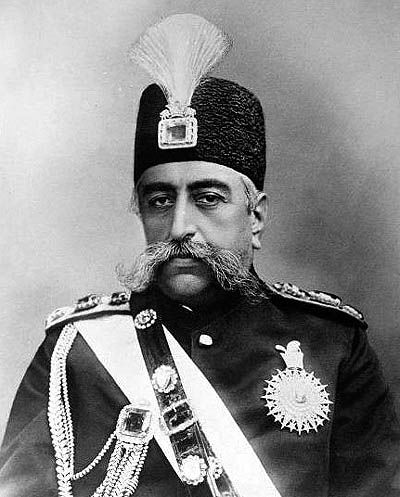
Mozaffar ad-Din Shah Qajar

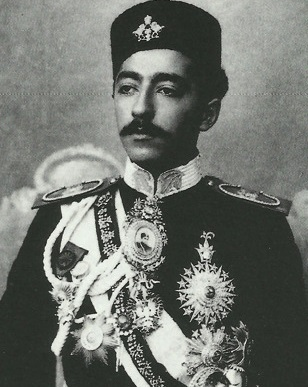
Mohammad Hassan Mirza

== See also ==
- Aryamehr
- Order of the Lion and the Sun
- Order of Aftab
- Order of Zolfaghar
