= Shadow of God =

Pre-Islamic title used by Iranian Muslim rulers

Shadow of God on earth (Arabic: ظل‌الله في الأرض, romanized: ẓill Allāh fi ’l-arḍ) (Note: Also transliterated from Persian as Ẓellollāh) was a title used by some Muslim rulers, expressing a claim to divinely guided kingship. It was adopted by the leaders of the Abbasid Caliphate, Ottoman Empire, Ghaznavid Empire, Safavid Iran, Qajar Iran, and Alawi Morocco.

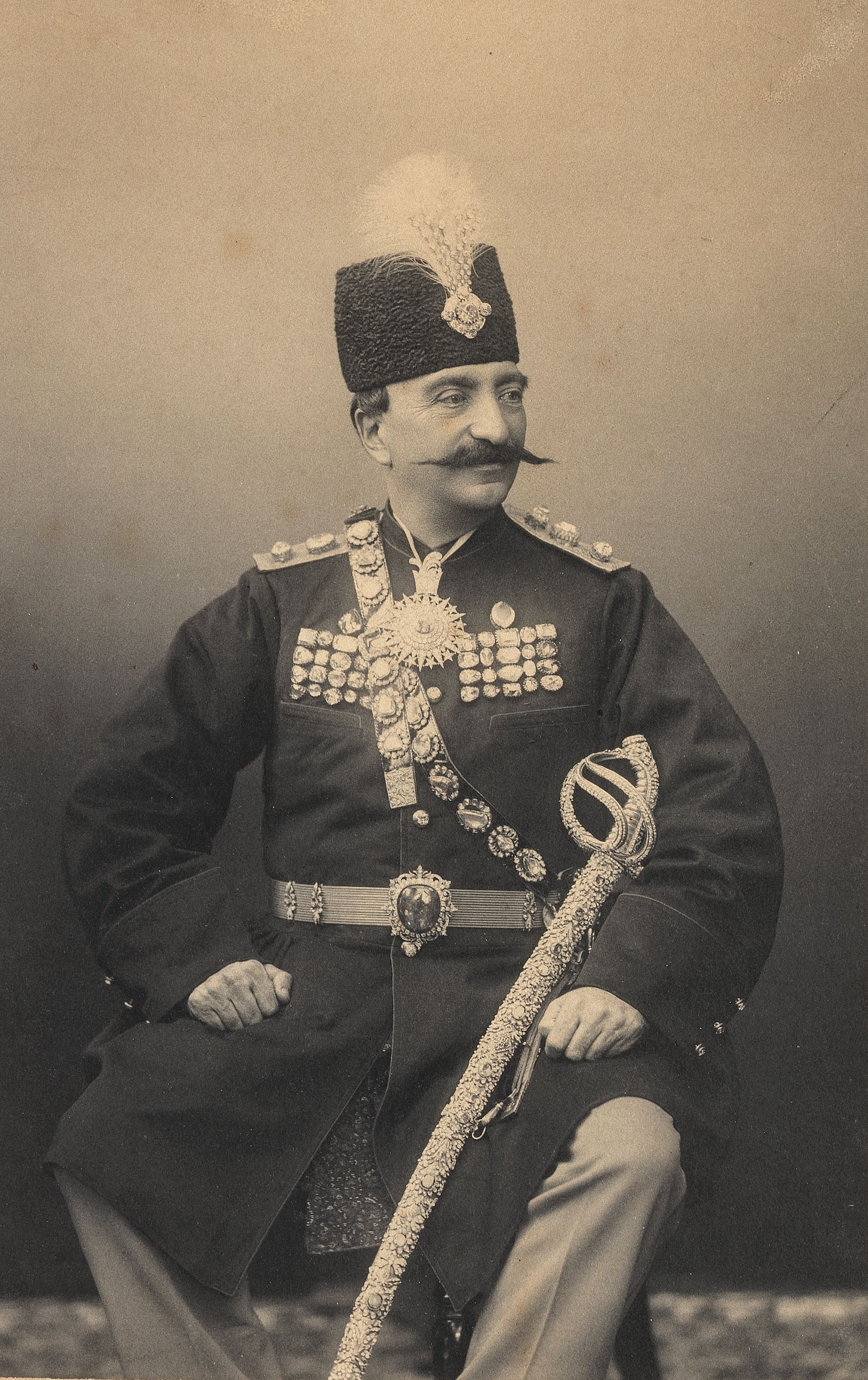
Naser al-Din Shah Qajar famously used the title Zell'ollah.

== In early Islam ==
The ancient Iranians believed in the idea of a divine kingship. During both the Achaemenid (550–330 BC) and Sasanian (224–651 AD) eras, only someone who had received the farr-e izadi (divine grace) was allowed to rule. Following the arrival of Islam to Iran, the Muslims incorporated this idea into their system of governance. Uthman (r. 644–656), the third Rashidun caliph, described the caliphate as "a garment in which he had been dressed by God." Later, Mu'awiya I (r. 661–680), the founder of the Umayyad Caliphate, regarded giving allegiance to his son Yazid as a divine act. The first Abbasid ruler al-Saffah called himself "God's sword and lock", claiming that it was God's will to kill or deprive his opponents of their wealth. The Abbasid caliphs were addressed as the "shadow of God on earth". According to Marshall Hodgson, a "comprehensive cultural pattern" developed in the society connected with the caliphal court, which, in contrast to ideas of the Sharia-minded ulama (scholars of religious law), was "more aristocratic than populistic" and "based in large measure on agrarian traditions such as those which had been kept alive from Sâsânian times among the landed gentry of the Iranian highlands, including Khurâsân." While Sharia-minded Muslims emphasize the equality of all men before God, courtly society assigned a status to the caliph very close to that of the Sasanian monarch, stopping short of using language that would ascribe any actual divinity to the caliph.

== In Safavid and post-Safavid Iran ==
The doctrine of imamah served to uphold divine kingship when Shia Islam was made the official religion of Iran by the Safavid dynasty (1501–1736). Its founder, Shah Ismail I (r. 1501–1524), was regarded as the forerunner of the Hidden Imam, or the Mahdi. By successfully applying the concepts of Mahdism and imamah, the first Safavid rulers were able to claim divinity and incarnation without facing major theological opposition, even though this is prohibited in Islamic doctrine of tawhid.

Although the Persian monarchy became more secular under the Pahlavi dynasty (1925–1979), both Reza Shah and Mohammad Reza Pahlavi increased their authority by utilizing the idea of divine kingship. Mohammad Reza Pahlavi felt that without its customary divine reassurance, the monarchy would fall. Furthermore, he thought that Iranian society was so deeply associated with kingship that the throne would never be vacant.

== See also ==
- Pivot of the Universe (title)

== Sources ==
- Bennison, Amira K. (2 September 2003). Jihad and its Interpretation in Pre-Colonial Morocco: State-Society Relations during the French Conquest of Algeria. Routledge. ISBN 978-1-135-78814-8.
- Dorraj, Manochehr; Mabrook, Ali (2009). "Shadow of God". In John L. Esposito (ed.). The Oxford Encyclopedia of the Islamic World. Oxford University Press.
- Hodgson, Marshall G. S. (1974). The Venture of Islam: Conscience and History in a World Civilization. Vol. 1. University of Chicago Press. ISBN 0-226-34683-8.
- Esposito, John L. (2004). "Shadow of God". The Islamic World: Past and Present. Oxford University Press.
