= Pivot of the Universe (title) =

Royal title used in Qajar dynasty

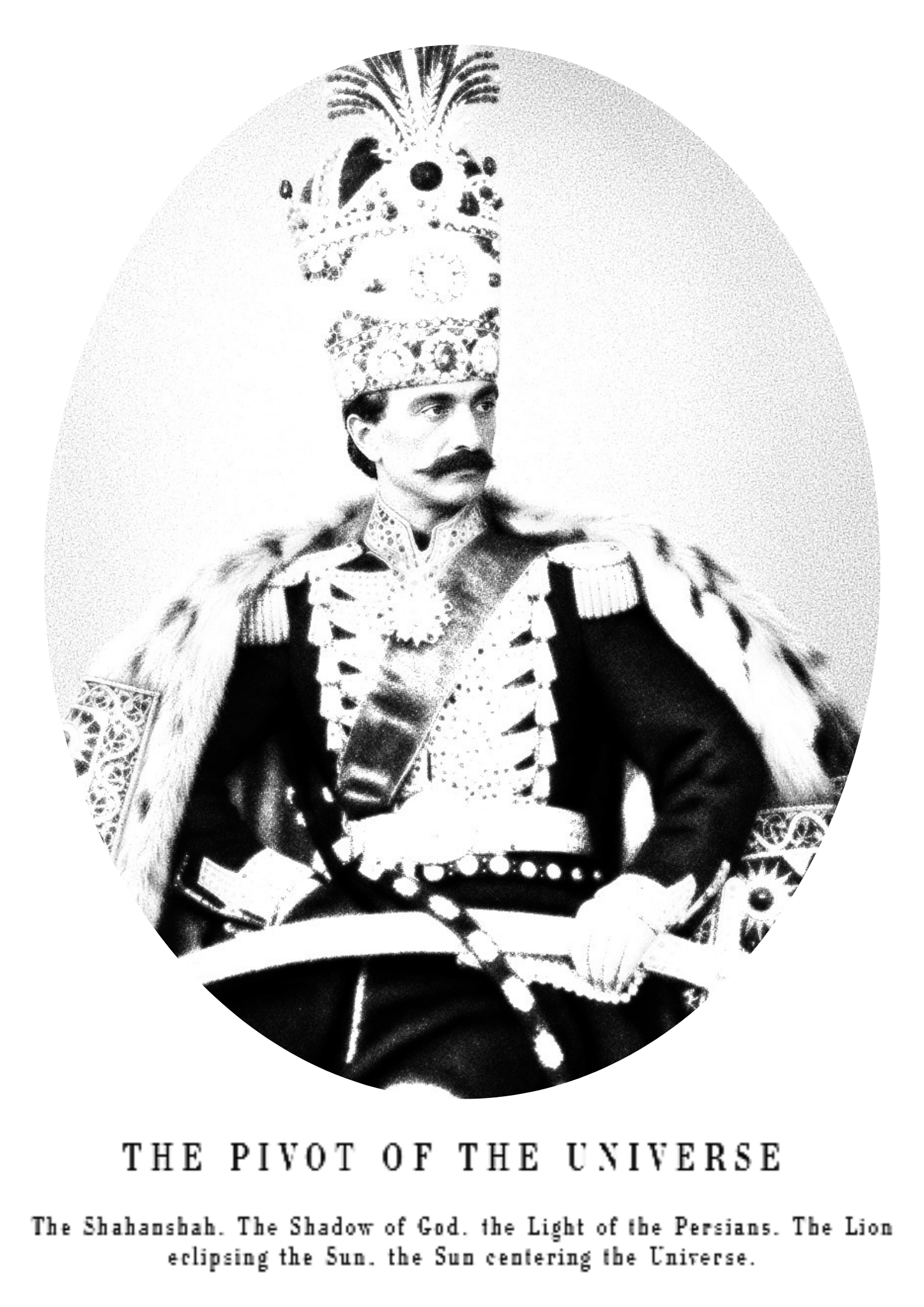
A 19th-century cabinet card depicting Naser al-Din Shah Qajar, styled Pivot of the Universe.

Pivot of the Universe, alternatively Center of the Universe, (Persian: قبله عالم, romanized: Qebleh-ye Ālam) is a Persian royal title and style used by the monarchs of the Qajar dynasty, having been formalized as an official title by Naser al-Din Shah Qajar.

The title continued to be used under Mohammad Reza Pahlavi, having styled himself Center of the Universe.

== See also ==
- Shadow of God
- Pivot of the Universe (book)
