= Khotanian =

Khotanian or Khotanese may refer to:

- Hotan
- The Kingdom of Khotan
- The Khotanese language
