= Order of the Lion and the Sun =

Iranian award (1808–1925)

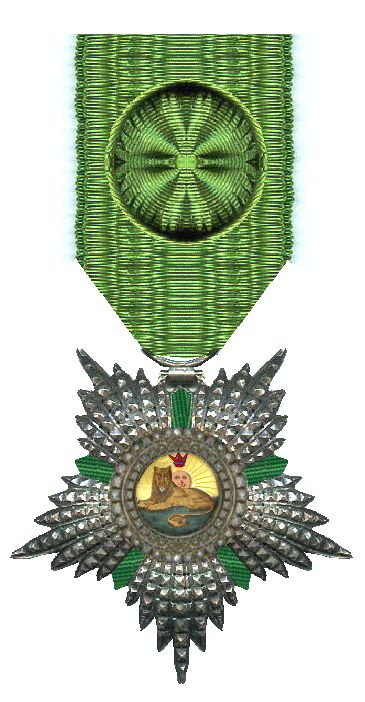
- Officer's Medal of the Order

Awarded by Head of the Iranian Imperial Family
- Type: Dynastic Order
- Royal house: House of Pahlavi
- Sovereign: Crown Prince Reza of Iran
- Grades: Knight/Dame Grand Cordon, Knight/Dame Grand Officer, Knight/Dame Commander, Knight/Dame Officer, Knight/Dame, Companion
- Former grades: Knight Grand Cross with Collar

Precedence
- Next (higher): Order of Aqdas
- Next (lower): Order of the Crown; Order of the Pleiades
- Ribbon of the Order

The Imperial Order of the Lion and the Sun (Persian: نشان سلطنتی شیر و خورشید) was instituted by Fat’h Ali Shah of the Qajar dynasty in 1808 to honour foreign officials (later extended to Iranians) who had rendered distinguished services to Iran. In 1925, under the Pahlavi dynasty the Order continued as the Order of Homayoun with new insignia, though based on the Lion and Sun motif. This motif was used for centuries by the rulers of Iran, being formally adopted under Mohammad Shah.

The order is abbreviated as KLS, for Knight of Lion and Sun.

The order was senior to the Order of the Crown. It was issued in five grades:

- Grand Cross
- Grand Officer
- Commander
- Officer
- Knight.

== In literature ==
- Anton Chekhov has a short story titled The Lion And The Sun. The story is about a mayor who had "long been desirous of receiving the Persian order of The Lion and the Sun".

== Notable recipients ==
Notable recipients
Name	Year	Rank	Reason awarded
Napoleon III of France	1856	Grand Cross	
Leopold I of Belgium	1859	Grand Cross	
Victor Emmanuel III of Italy	1902	First Class	
Milan I of Serbia			
Friedrich von Beck-Rzikowsky		First Class in Diamonds	Austrian field marshal, chief of the general staff of the Imperial and Royal Army of Austria-Hungary (1881–1906)
Dr. Franz Nadler	1900	Commander Cross	Mayor of Mariánské Lázně
William Summerill Vanneman	1896	Second and Third Class	Service to Shah and provision health care to population

== See also ==
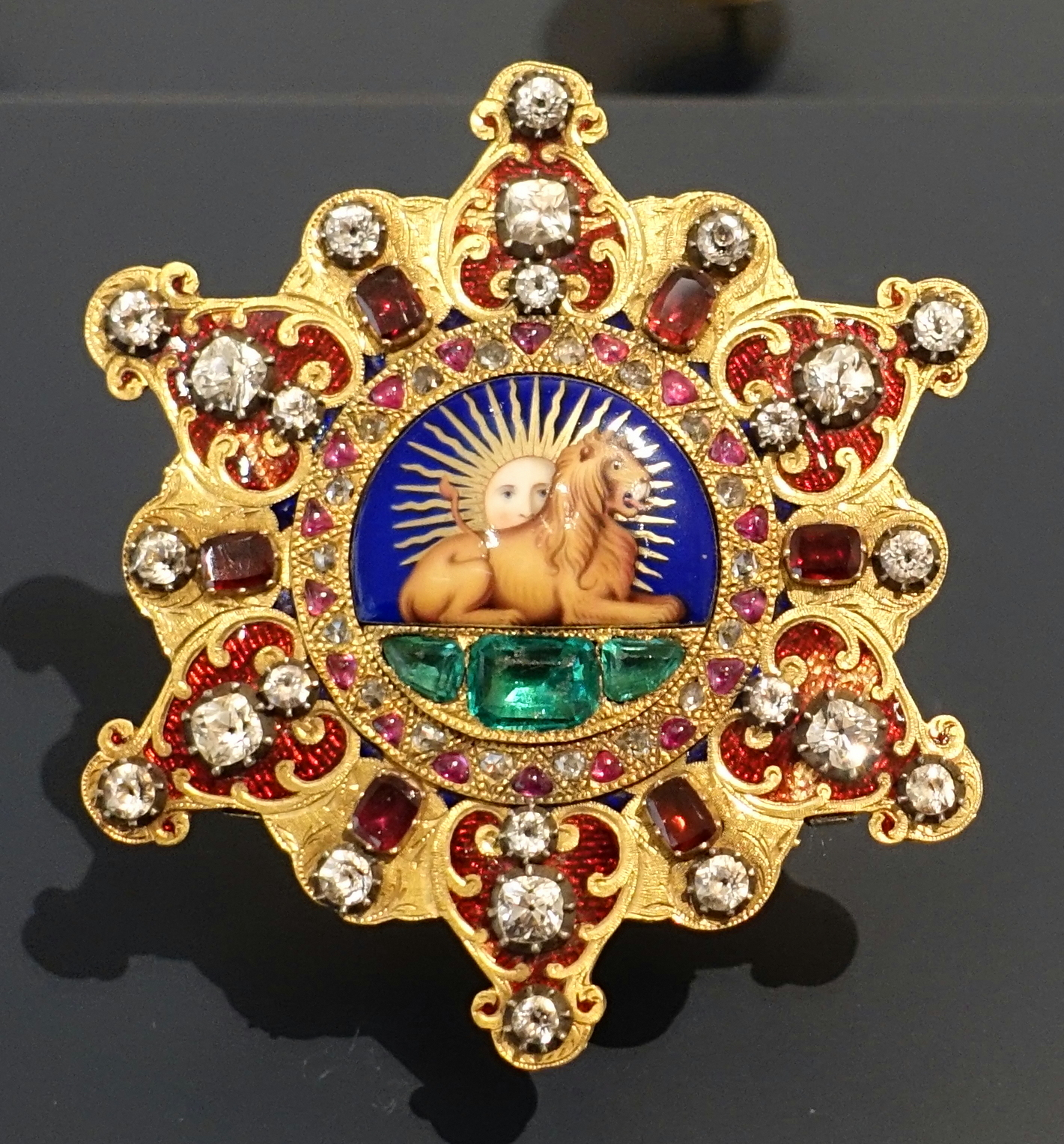
Pendant of the Order of the Lion, France, 1840–1860, enameled gold with diamonds, rubies, garnets, and paste - Aga Khan Museum - Toronto, Canada

- Lion and Sun
- Order of Aftab
- Order of the Red Lion and the Sun
- Neshan-e Aqdas
- Order of Zolfaghar

== Sources ==
- Mikaberidze, Alexander (2005). Russian Officer Corps of the Revolutionary and Napoleonic Wars. Casemate Publishers. ISBN 978-1611210026.
