= Order of the Pleiades (Iran) =

Iranian order, awarded by the Shah

- Sash and Star of the Order

Awarded by Head of the Iranian Imperial Family Spouse of the Head of the Iranian Imperial Family
- Type: Dynastic Order
- Royal house: House of Pahlavi
- Sovereign: Crown Prince Reza of Iran
- Grand Mistress: Empress Farah, Dowager Empress
- Grades: 1st Class, 2nd Class, 3rd Class

Precedence
- Next (higher): Order of the Lion and the Sun
- Next (lower): Order of the Red Lion and the Sun
- Equivalent: Order of the Crown
- Ribbon of the Order

The Order of the Pleiades (Persian: نشان هفت‌پیکر Nishân-i-Haftpaykar), also known as the Order of Haft Paykar, was an all-female order of the former Imperial State of Iran.

== History ==
The Order was instituted not later than 1955 by the last Shah of Iran, Mohammad Reza Pahlavi. In 1959-67 it consisted of two, and since 1967 - of three classes (1st class, 2nd class, and 3rd class), and was awarded to female persons of high status, for deserving special recognition or conspicuous appreciation by the Shah.

It is believed that the Order honours Soraya Esfandiary-Bakhtiari, the second wife of the former Shah Mohammad Reza Pahlavi. The name of the order refers to the Pleiades, a star cluster located in the constellation Taurus in the Northern Hemisphere. Soraya is a female Persian name with a reference to the Pleiades.

The order was abolished by the Islamic Republic of Iran after the fall of the last Shah. Since then, the order merely continues as a Royal Family Order, and Empress Farah Pahlavi, the third wife and widow of Shah Mohammad Reza Pahlavi, is still the grandmaster of this order.

== Classes ==
- First Class - Reserved for female consorts of reigning sovereigns. A sash with pendant is worn on the right shoulder. In 1955-59 a larger sized badge was worn from a bow in the same colours and material as the sash, pinned on the left shoulder. The insignia of the first class includes a breast star from the very start but the shoulder badge was abandoned for this class not later than 1959.
- Second Class - Was awarded to royal princesses or first ladies only. The insignia of the second class consists of a breast star, sash and sash badge, but no shoulder badge is included.
- Third Class - Was given to female members of the Imperial Household or to ladies of high rank. The insignia of this class consists of a badge only, which is similar to that of the 2nd class, but smaller. It is worn suspended from a bow.

Attached to the order are three medals: first class in gold, second class in gold and silver, and third class in silver. They were usually awarded to female members of the Imperial Household for long or faithful service. The medals are worn suspended from a bow.

== Insignia ==
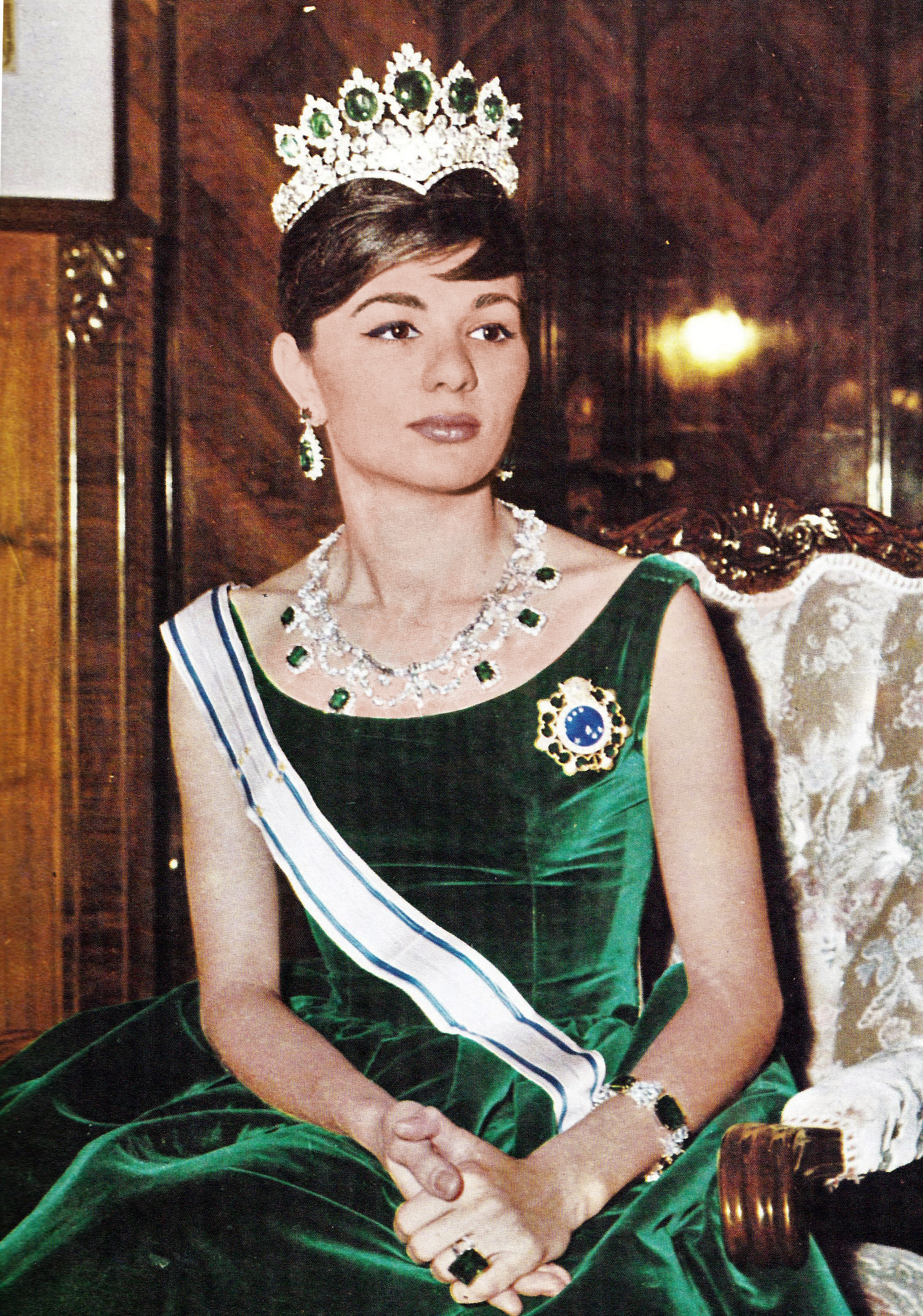
The Empress of Iran, Farah Pahlavi, wearing the sash and insignia of the Order of the Pleiades.

The sash badge of the first class is a round medallion made of gold gilt surrounded by six open ornaments, shaped as large double loops in gold; with between the ornaments partly white enameled, small shell-shaped designs. The central disc is made of blue enamel, with placed on it seven golden stars, topped with brilliants, and depicting the star cluster Pleiades. Furthermore, the disc itself is surrounded by a white enamel and gold edged ring with twenty-four stars thereon, made of gold and brilliants. The disc is topped by a stylized imperial Pahlavi Crown, enameled in different colors and enriched with carbuncles and brilliants.

The shoulder badge is similar to the sash badge, but is larger in appearance.

The sash badge of the second class is almost identical to the badge of the first class, but instead the medallion and the stars on it are made in silver gilt only. Similarly, the crown is enameled without the carbuncles and brilliants.

The star consists of a blue enameled central disc, with placed on it seven golden stars, topped with brilliants, representing the stars of the cluster Pleiades. The disc is surrounded by a white enamel and gold edged ring with twenty-four stars thereon, made of gold and brilliants. This as a whole is surrounded by six open ornaments, shaped as large double loops in gold; with between the ornaments partly white enameled, small shell-shaped designs. The disc is topped by a stylized imperial Pahlavi Crown, enameled in different colors and enriched with carbuncles and brilliants. At the back a pin is attached to wear the star on the left breast.

The sash is made of a white coloured silk moiré ribbon, with dark blue stripes near the borders. The badge is attached to the sash by a suspension ring from the top of the crown.

The medals show the image of the badge of the order as a full raised relief. The rim includes a large lip, on which the seven small, shell-like designs rest. The medals are topped with the stylized imperial Pahlavi Crown to which a simple ring is attached. The medals are unenameled and identical in appearance, except for the metal pertaining to the particular class.
