= Order of the Crown (Iran) =

Former Iranian royal order

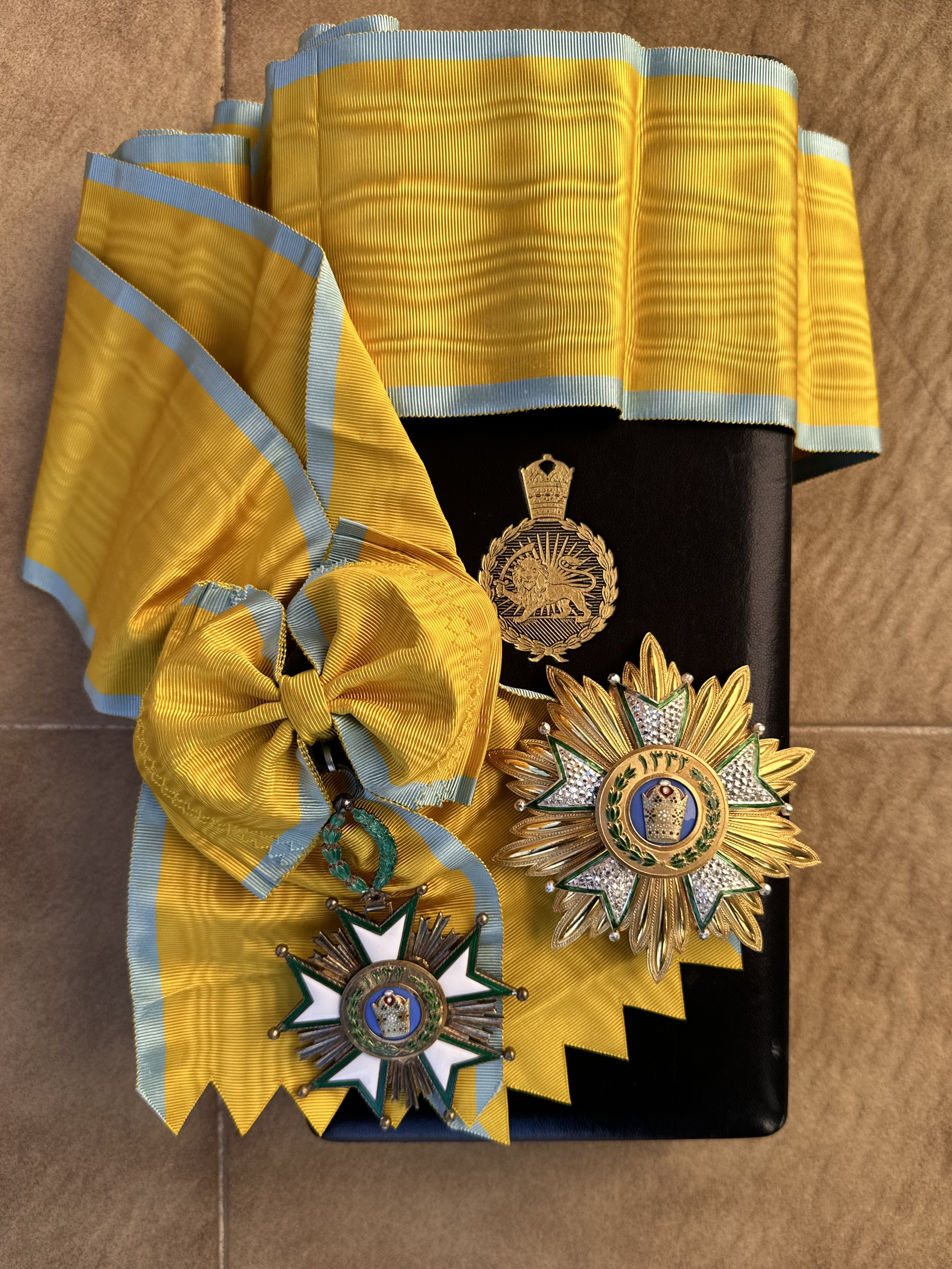
- Grand Cordon insignia of the Order

Awarded by Head of the Iranian Imperial Family
- Type: Dynastic Order
- Royal house: House of Pahlavi
- Sovereign: Crown Prince Reza of Iran
- Grades: 1st Class, 2nd Class, 3rd Class

Precedence
- Next (higher): Order of the Lion and the Sun
- Next (lower): Order of the Red Lion and the Sun
- Equivalent: Order of the Pleiades
- Ribbon of the Order

The Order of the Crown (Persian: نشان تاج, romanized: Neshan-e Taj) was founded in 1913 (1332 AH) by Ahmad Shah Qajar before his coronation as the highest dynastic and state order. Until 1926 it existed in two classes (with breast star and sash for both). The 1st class had a collar (neck chain with badge as a pendant) reserved for the Shahanshah and the Crown-Prince. The Order was preserved in Iran after the fall of the Qajar dynasty.

The first Shah of the Pahlavi dynasty, Reza Shah, reformed the order at the end of the year in 1938/39. Until then, the sash was blue with thin green-white borders but, after the reform, it became corn-yellow with sky-blue edges.The order was the senior one after the dynastic Order of Pahlavi. It was abolished in 1979 following the Iranian revolution.

== See also ==
- Lion and Sun
