= Order of Pahlavi =

Imperial Iranian honour

- Medal of the order, incorporating the dynastic badge (Mount Damavand with a rising sun)

Awarded by Head of the Iranian Imperial Family
- Type: Dynastic Order
- Royal house: House of Pahlavi
- Ribbon: Blue with Gold edges.
- Sovereign: Crown Prince Reza of Iran
- Classes: 1st Class, 2nd Class

Precedence
- Next (higher): None
- Next (lower): Order of Aryamehr
- The ribbon of the order

The Order of Pahlavi (Persian: نشان پهلوی, "Neshan-e Pahlavi") was the highest order of the former Imperial State of Iran.

== History ==
The Order was instituted in 1932 by Rezā Shāh, the founder of the Dynasty of the Pahlavi, and it was awarded in two classes, i.e.: 1st class (with collar) and 2nd class (without collar). It was Iran's highest-ranking order and was named for the family name of the Shah. The 1st class was limited to the immediate Iranian Imperial Family, reigning monarchs, and foreign heads of state. The 2nd class was awarded to other male members of the Iranian Imperial Family and to crown princes of foreign nations.

The order was abolished by the Islamic Republic of Iran after the fall of the last Shah. Since then, the order exists as the highest dynastic decoration of the Imperial House of Pahlavi.

The decorations include a golden collar with blue and gold links, the jewel of the order hanging from a broad ribbon and a star on the breast.

The badge is a precious jewel made in the shape of a cross with imperial crowns as arms. In the space between the arms golden and blue rays are placed. In the central medallion, Mount Damavand is depicted with a rising sun behind it. The star is the same as the jewel.

The Second Class of the Order bears a jewel with links between the crowns. The ribbon was blue with a gold rim.

== Recipients ==
- Abdul Halim of Kedah
- Abdullah I of Jordan
- Prince Aimone, Duke of Aosta
- Baudouin of Belgium
- Bhumibol Adulyadej
- Faisal I of Iraq
- Faisal II of Iraq
- Farouk of Egypt
- Frederik IX of Denmark
- George VI
- Gerald Ford
- Ghazi of Iraq
- Giovanni Leone
- Gustaf VI Adolf of Sweden
- Habib Bourguiba
- Haile Selassie
- Hassan II of Morocco
- Hussein of Jordan
- Isa bin Salman Al Khalifa
- Ismail Nasiruddin of Terengganu
- Yahya Khan
- Edvard Beneš
- Heinrich Lübke
- Mahendra of Nepal
- Iskander Mirza
- Mohammad Reza Pahlavi
- Olav V of Norway
- Ali Reza Pahlavi (son of Reza Shah)
- Gholamreza Pahlavi
- Reza Pahlavi, Crown Prince of Iran
- Qaboos bin Said al Said
- Mohammed Zahir Shah
- Josip Broz Tito
- Antonín Novotný
- Suharto
- Charles de Gaulle
- King Saud of Saudi Arabia
- Urho Kekkonen
