= Pahlavi gold coins =

Official gold coins of Iran (1926–79)

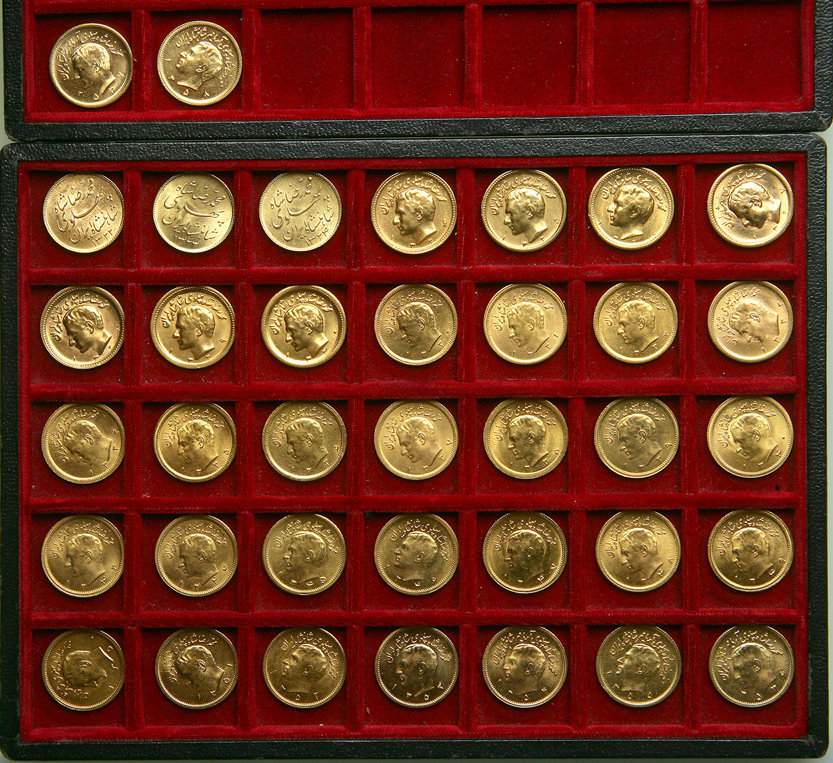
A Collection of One Pahlavi Coins from 1943 to 1979

The "Pahlavi Coins" (Persian: سکه پهلوی) were the official gold coins of Iran from 1926 to 1979, and the term "Pahlavi" is the currency of these coins. These coins replaced the Qajar Toman gold coins when Reza Shah Pahlavi came to power in 1925 and the monetary system changed in 1926. After the 1979 Revolution in Iran the name of these coins was changed to "Bahar Azadi".

== History ==
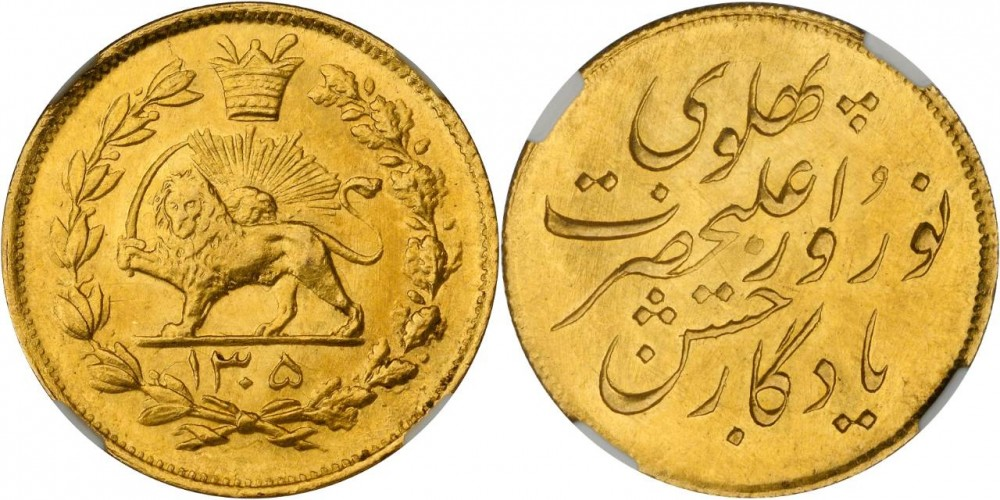
The last gold coin of Iran in Toman Currency system; on the commemorative of Nowruz celebration; 1926

The first Pahlavi coins, which were minted from 1926 to 1929, were similar to Qajar coins in gold purity (0.900) and coin margins (oak and olive branches), but differed in design, type and timeline, weight, and calendar system. In fact, in this period, only in 1926, the standard of the Toman coins weighing (2.85 grams) was used to mint gold coins.

Thus, two thousand dinar coins (one fifth Tomans) and five thousand (half Toman) of Qajar gold coins were generally removed, and coins of one, two and five Pahlavi were replaced with coins of one, two and five Tomans.

== Pahlavi coinage rules ==
=== Rules of gold coinage in Reza Shah era ===
==== The law of determining the unit and the scale of money ====
This law, legislated in National Majlis on 14 March 1930, had 14 articles, including:

Article 1- Gold Scale: The legal currency of Iran is the Rial of Gold, which is equivalent to one hundred dinars.

Article 2- Coins and their scale

Gold Coin: Twenty Rials called Pahlavi Gold Coin. Ten Rials called Half Pahlavi Gold Coin.

Article 3- Net weight and coin weight

A Rial is equivalent to 0.3661191 grams of pure gold.

Pahlavi gold coin (equivalent to twenty Rials) has 7.322382 grams of pure gold, one kilogram of pure gold should be used for 136.57 pieces of one Pahlavi gold coins.

Half-Pahlavi gold coin has a weight of 3.661191 grams of pure gold, one kilogram of pure gold should be used for 273.2 pieces of half-penny coins.

Note - The grade of gold coins is 900 per 1000 pure gold and 100 per 1000 copper.

Article 4- The maximum weight and purity uncertainty of each gold coin have to be 0.002.

Article 5- Coin shape

a- All the coins mentioned above are round.

b- Gold coins have on one side the image of the king of Iran and on the other side is the Lion and Sun as coat of arms, value, and coinage date.

Article 6- Coinage right

The exclusive right to mint all gold coins in Iran is reserved for the government mint; however, the minting of gold coins is accessible to the general public, and the coinage fee per kilogram of pure gold must not exceed ten rials.

Other articles dealt with defective coins, counterfeit, coins of gold or bullion (as backbone of money), the Rial's prevalence date, the gold import license, the purchase of gold by the government, and the date of law enforcement.

Perhaps this was the first time in the history of coinage in Iran, in which uncertainty was considered in the law.

With the change in the weight and size of "one Pahlavi" gold coin, this coin became approximately equivalent in weight and diameter to the British sovereign started by George III in 1817.

==== Amendment of the law ====
The changes, legislated on 13 March 1932, of the mentioned law were as follows:

Article 1- Amendments to the previous resolution are as follows

a-Gold coin of 100 Rials called Pahlavi. Fifty Rials Gold Coin called Half Pahlavi

b- One rial equivalent to 0.033322882 grams of pure gold.

Article 2- From 21 March 1932, the coins of one and half Pahlavi and silver coins of half, one, two and five rials, and nickel coins of five, ten and twenty-five dinars, and banknotes of the American banknote issued in New York, are valid.

Article 3- Since the enactment of the law, the coinage of previous gold coins and silver and nickel coins with Shahi and Qiran currencies have been banned.

As the amendment demonstrates, especially in the case of the depreciation of the Rial against gold, the reduction of silver coins purity from 0.900 to 0.828, The use of the term "Restoration of the normal economic situation" in Article 10 of the Amendment, create restrictions on the issuance of gold and the import of silver and to unify it with the permission of the Cabinet in Article 12 of the Amendment, could imply the financial crisis in Iran at that time. The reason for this economic crisis is the fall in the value of silver in the late 1920s and early 1930s. Because the Iranian currency at that time was based on silver.

=== Rules of gold coinage in the time of Mohammad Reza Shah ===
==== The law of gold coin ====
The law was passed by the National Majlis on 12 March 1958 and Senate on 17 April 1958, which included seven articles and one note:

Article 1 - This article refers to the size, weight, diameter, and limit of the weight of Pahlavi coins, summarized in Table 2 below.

Other articles refer to the form, design, grade, finite grade (0.002), mintage monopoly, and the Ministry of Finance as its executor. Also in the note of this law is the change in the diameter of the quarter Pahlavi diameter from 14 mm to 16 mm.

Table- Properties of Pahlavi Coins in Mohammad Reza Shah era
Size	Pure Gold Weight (gram)	Coin Weight (gram)	Diameter (mm)	Weight Uncertainty (gram)	Weight unce. in Cor. Law	Coinage Date
Ten	73.223820	81.36	50	-	0.002	1976- 1980
Five	36.611910	40.68	40	0.002	0.002	1960- 1980
Two and Half	18.305955	20.34	30	0.0025	0.0025	1959- 1979
One	7.322382	8.13	22	0.0025	0.005	1941- 1980
Half	3.661191	4.07	19	0.005	0.005	1941-1980
Quarter	1.8305955	2.03	16	0.005	0.01	1953-1980
Khosravi	0.9152975	-	14	0.0075	-	Never

==== Correction of the gold coins law ====
The law, which legislated on 16 March 1976 in Majlis, dealt with increasing the uncertainty the coins weight of "two and half", "one", "half" and "quarter" Pahlavi, to license the coinage of "Ten Pahlavi" and add a phrase to license coinage of commemorative gold coins.

== Pahlavi coins at Reza Shah's era ==
These coins are divided into two types depending on the design, weight, and diameter of the coin.

=== Pahlavi coins of the first type ===
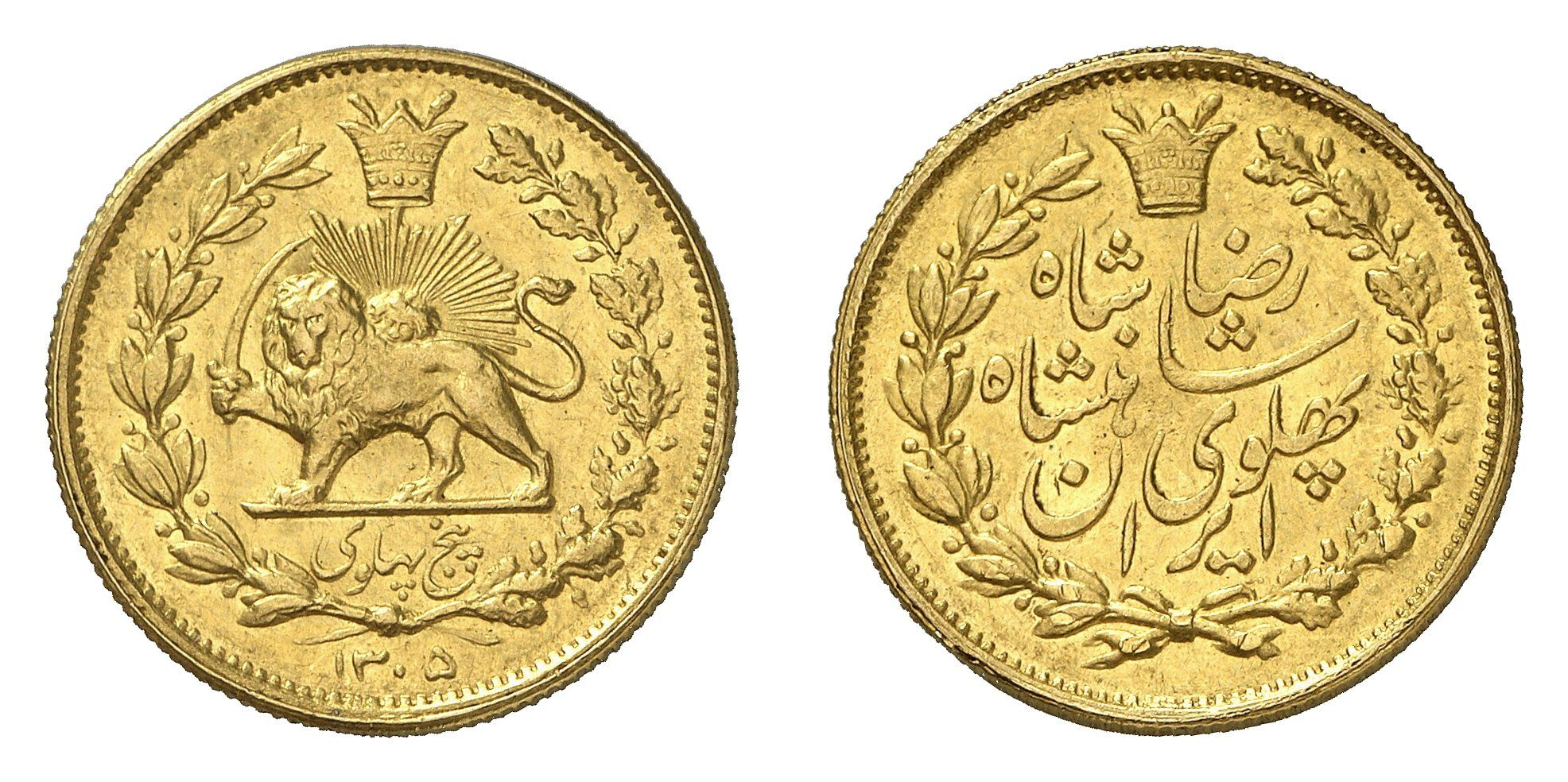
Five Pahlavi Coin (legend type) of Reza Pahlavi era; 1926

These coins are categorized into two types: Legend type and portrait type.

==== Legend type Pahlavi coins of Reza Shah ====
These coins include one, two, and five Pahlavi and only minted in 1926, and on both sides, they have the Qajar crown and oak and olive branches, and on the reverse, there is the symbolic lion and sun (coat of arms), which is very similar in this respect to Qajar gold Toman. The only difference is the inclusion of Reza Shah's title as "Reza Shah Pahlavi Shahanshah Iran"- in Persian legends: "رضا شاه پهلوی شاهنشاه ایران" on the coin and change the calendar from the Arabic/ Lunar to the Persian/ solar. These coins, especially the legend type five Pahlavi (with the mintage of 271 pieces), are among the scarce gold coins.

==== Portrait type Pahlavi Coins of Reza Shah ====
This series of coins that are also known as small hat are coins of one, two and five Pahlavi, and have significantly differed from the coins in terms of design, as the image of the three face of Reza Shah with the Pahlavi hat on the obverse and the title of "Reza Shah Pahlavi Shahanshah Iran" is placed above his head and in the form of a semicircle. On the reverse of the coin the image of the Qajar crown is replaced by the Pahlavi crown, the Lion and Sun omitted and the value covered all the central center.

=== Pahlavi coins of the second type ===
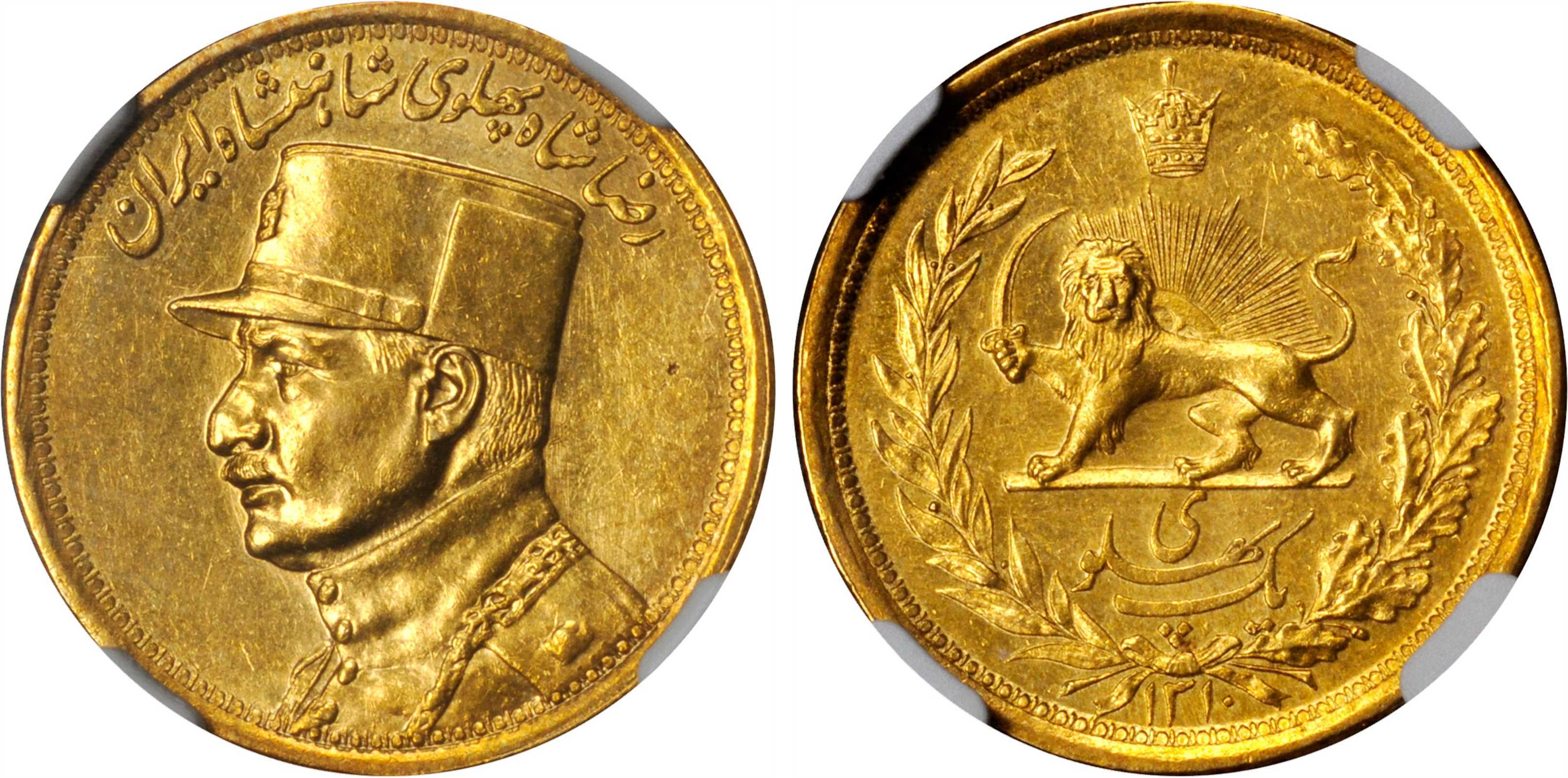
One Pahlavi Coin of Reza Pahlavi era (2nd type); 1931. Only 304 pieces of this coin minted.

This type of Reza Shah Pahlavi coins includes "half" and "one Pahlavi" coins and different in the shape, weight and size with the coins of the first type. On the obverse, the left bust of Reza Shah and his title can be seen, while on the reverse the Lion and Sun and Oak and Olive leaves have been returned.

The second type coin of one Pahlavi with a weight of 8.131592 grams, is only minted in one year and in 304 pieces.

== Pahlavi coins at the time of Mohammad Reza Shah ==
Mintage of these coins from the beginning to the accession of Mohammad Reza Pahlavi from 1941 to 1977, including coins of the quarter, half, one, two, and a half, five, and ten Pahlavi, and the last date of the coinage seen on them is 1979 (۱۳۵۸). The purpose of coinage with a date that has not yet been reached is to prepare the coins with the date of the day for distribution in the new year. Therefore, it can be assumed that Pahlavi coins dating back to 1979 (۱۳۵۸) after the 1979 revolution was illegally withdrawn from the mint. Also, the existence of coins with the Islamic-solar calendar after the changing of the calendar from the Islamic-solar to the Imperial/ Persian is very important because it suggests the fact that the regime of Mohammad Reza Pahlavi after the change of the calendar from the Islamic-Solar to imperial/ Persian and that confronted with religious opposition, despite the passing of three years since its launch, intended to restore the origin of the Islamic solar calendar.

=== Pahlavi gold coins of Mohammad Reza (legend) ===
The legend type gold coins of Mohammad Reza Pahlavi were minted from 1941 to 1945 and are included in two size: "half" and "one". The reverse of these coins are the same as Reza Shah the last series of one Pahlavi and only the mintage date is different and has been overprinted. On the obverse of them, there is the title of Shah and coinage date. So, they are the only gold coins of Iran that have two same dates on two sides. The coins of the years 1941 (۱۳۲۰) and 1942 (۱۳۲۱) coincided with the presence of the Allies in Iran, and maybe for this reason, they were minted at very low mintage, so that these coins are very rare. Half Pahlavi legend type has not minted in 1945 (۱۳۲۴).

=== Mohammad Reza Shah's Pahlavi coins ===
The coinage dates of these coins are 1945 (۱۳۲۴) to 1979 (۱۳۵۸) and are seen in "quarter" to "ten Pahlavi" sizes. Designation of them is the same as the end of Pahlavi rule except in commemorative coins. Half Pahlavi and One Pahlavi gold coins are in two types: "high relief" and "ordinary" Pahlavi coins.

==== High Relief Pahlavi Coins ====
These coins which minted from 1945 (۱۳۲۴) to 1951 (۱۳۳۰) have two sizes: "half" and "one" Pahlavi. The legends and images of these coins on two sides are not very fine and detailed which sometimes they are confused with fake coins. High relief half Pahlavi of 1951 (۱۳۳۰) is scarce.

==== Pahlavi gold coins (portrait) ====
These coins are in "quarter", "half", "one", "two and half", "five" and "ten" Pahlavi sizes.

===== Quarter Pahlavi =====
This coin, which was first mass-produced in 1953, was produced in two diameters: 14 and 16 mm. Quarter coins with a size of 14 mm have been minted from 1953 to 1957, and 16mm quarter coins dating from 1337 to 1358. Since 1974, with the addition of the word "Aryamehr"- "آریامهر" to the title of Shah, the term "Mohammad Reza Shah Pahlavi Aryamehr Shahanshah Iran"- "محمّدرضا شاه پهلوی آریامهر شاهنشاه ایران" was added to the coin. In 1977 and 1978, with the change of the official calendar of Iran from Solar calendar to Imperial calendar, the dates of these coins are ۲۵۳۶ and ۲۵۳۷, respectively.

The coin of the Quarter Pahlavi commemorating the coronation celebration in 1967 was minted by the year ۱۳۴۶. On the obverse of this coin, four digits of date as 26 October 1967 (۴۶ آبان) and the words "to the commemoration of the coronation"- in Persian: "بمیمنت جشن تاجگذاری" on the reverse. It has used the dies of Quarter Pahlavi coins of previous years for minting; thus this coin has a low coinage quality.

Thus, four editions of quarter Pahlavi have been minted during the reign of Mohammad Reza Shah: the 14mm coin, the ordinary, the Aryamehr and the commemorative quarter Pahlavi.

===== Half Pahlavi Gold Coin =====
The flat (vs. high relief) type of this coin was first introduced to the market in 1951. This coin also has a variety of ordinary and Aryamehr, the first type is from 1951 (۱۳۳۰) to 1974 (۱۳۵۳) and the second type has been minted from 1975 (۱۳۵۴) to 1979 (۱۳۵۸). In the years 1977 and 1978, the date of coins are ۲۵۳۶ and ۲۵۳۷, respectively.

===== One Pahlavi Gold Coin =====
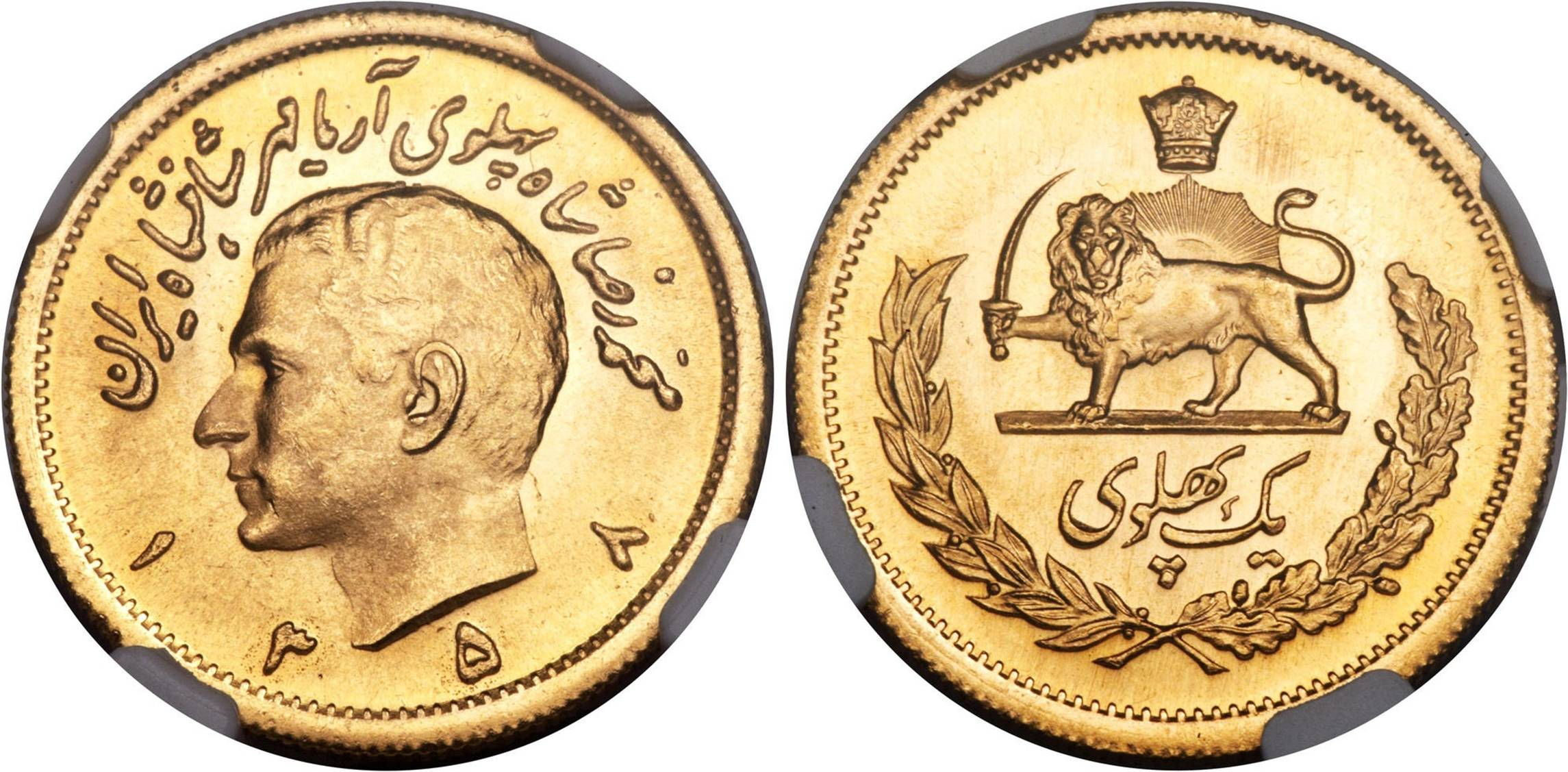
The Last One Pahlavi Coin of Mohammad Reza Pahlavi; minted in 1979 for 1980.

The flat mintage of this coin began as a half coin from 1951 and ended with the date of 1979. In the years 1962 and 1963 have not been minted, the coins of the years 1952 and 1953, of which mintage at the same time as the Nationalization Movement of the Oil Industry, the departure of Mohammad Reza Pahlavi from Iran, followed by the coup d'état of August 19, 1953, had very low mintage and, in this regard, were classified as scarce coins.

===== Two and Half Pahlavi Gold Coin =====
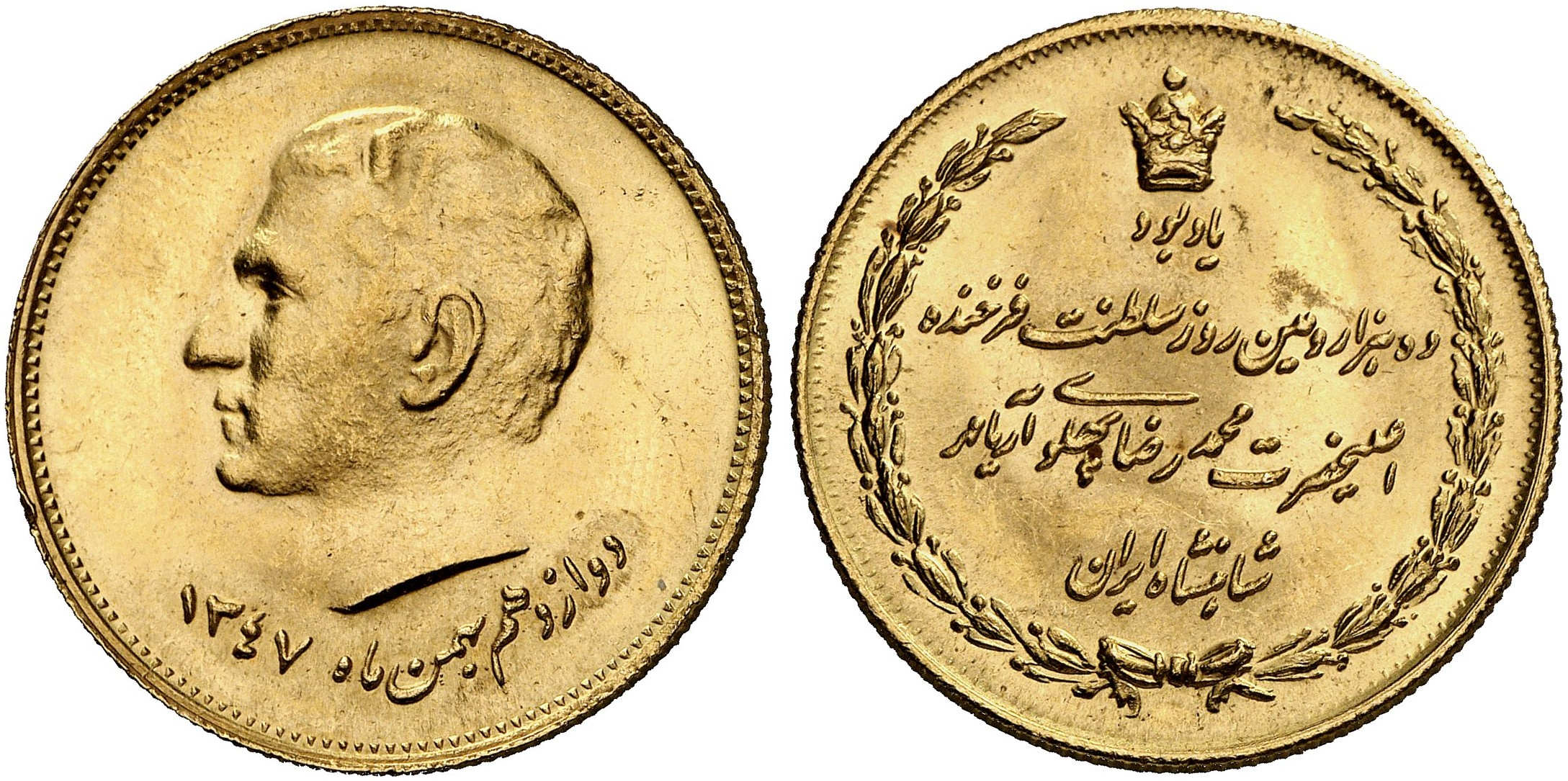
Commemorative medal on ten thousandth day of Mohammad Reza Pahlavi Reign; 1969. In that year, no two and half Pahlavi coin minted.

The first two and a half Pahlavi coins were minted in 1959 on the commemorative of Mohammad Reza Pahlavi and Farah royal wedding in a very low mintage. This coin is the only coin that has no value on and why it is considered a coin and is not classified as memorial medal is not determined. Coins of two and a half Pahlavi were irregularly minted in the 1960s and periodically from 1971 to 1979. This coin has not been seen with the date of ۱۳۵۸. The title of Aryamehr has been added to this coin since 1975. Thus, this coin can be seen in three different editions: the royal wedding commemorative, the ordinary and the Aryamehr. A medal in the size of "Two and a half Pahlavi" and on the commemorative for 10,000th day of the reign of Mohammad Reza Pahlavi "was minted on the 1st of February, 1969 (۱۳۴۷), which due to the size wrongly titled as "two and half Pahlavi". This medal is minted in a high mintage, so its price is less than or equal to "two and a half Pahlavi". Interestingly, "two and a half Pahlavi" has not minted in this year (1969–۱۳۴۷).

===== Five Pahlavi Gold Coin =====
The beginning of the coin returns to the year 1961, and has been steadily minted in the same way as the "two and half Pahlavi"; discontinuously in 1960s but contiguously in 1970's. This coin has two types: common and Aryamehr.

===== Ten Pahlavi Gold Coin =====
This coin only has four coinage dates: ۲۵۳۵, ۲۵۳۶, ۲۵۳۷ and ۱۳۵۸. The 10 Pahlavi coin, which was minted in 1977, is the only Pahlavi coin minted by this date with the imperial date and other Pahlavi coins minted this year (quarter, half, one, two, and half, and five coins) has Hijri coinage date. The 10 Pahlavi coins were commemorated in 1977 and 1978; the first one was commemorated on the fifth anniversary on the Pahlavi dynasty and the second on the 100th anniversary of the birth of Reza Shah.

The commemorative 10 Pahlavi on the fifth anniversary of the reign of Pahlavi has the first and second Pahlavi images on its obverse, while on the reverse there are fifty solid dotes located on the two rings which encircled the Pahlavi crown.

The coin of Ten Pahlavi commemorating the 100th anniversary of the birth of Reza Shah has a phrase about the date on the reverse, surrounded by branches of oak and olive around and has the Pahlavi crown above.

The coins of the 10 Pahlavi of 2537 and 1979 (۱۳۵۸) have the same common elements as Pahlavi coins.

Thus, the coins of the Ten Pahlavi also have three different types: the commemoration of the fiftieth birthday of the Pahlavi Empire, the commemoration of the 100th anniversary of the birth of Reza Shah and the ten ordinary Pahlavi.

== Gallery ==
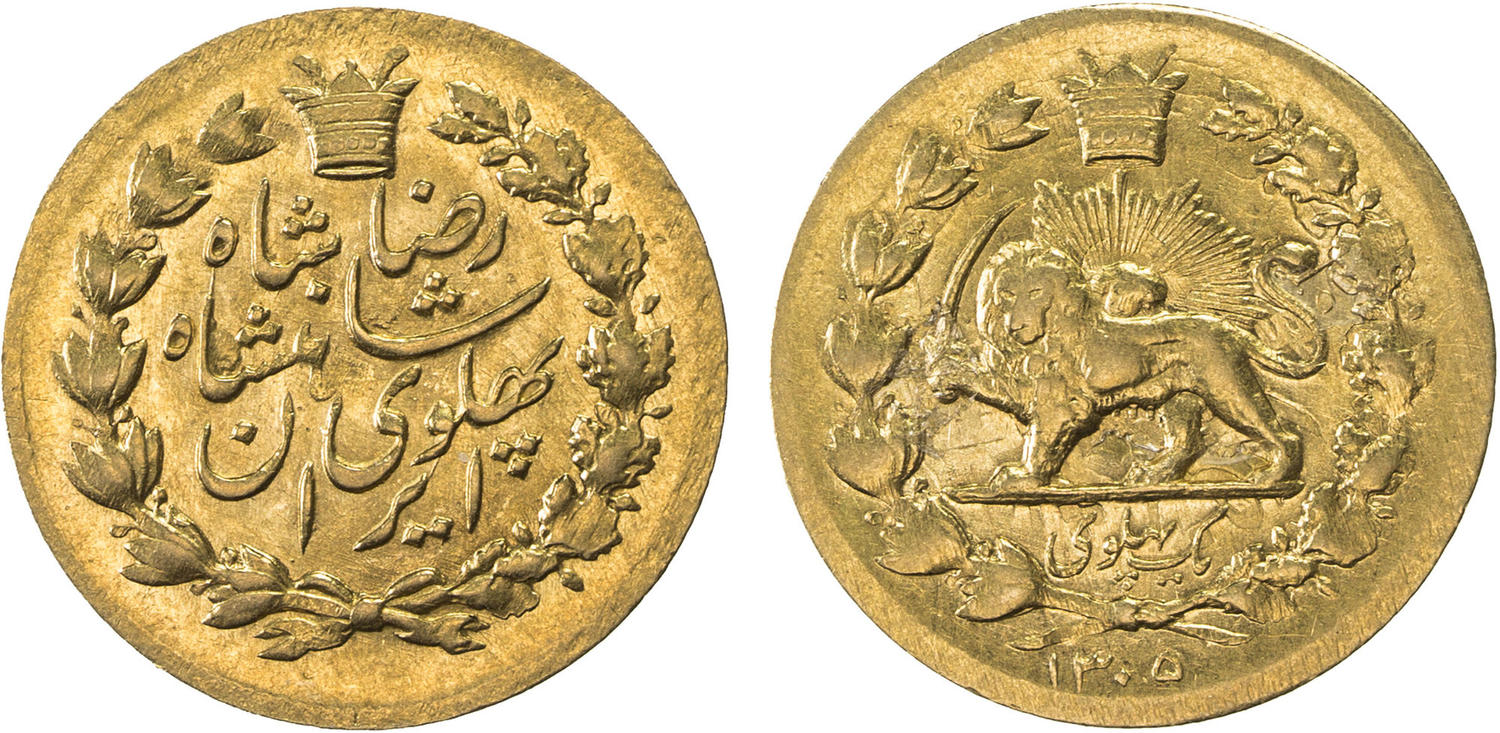
One Pahlavi Coin (ligend type) of Reza Shah Era.

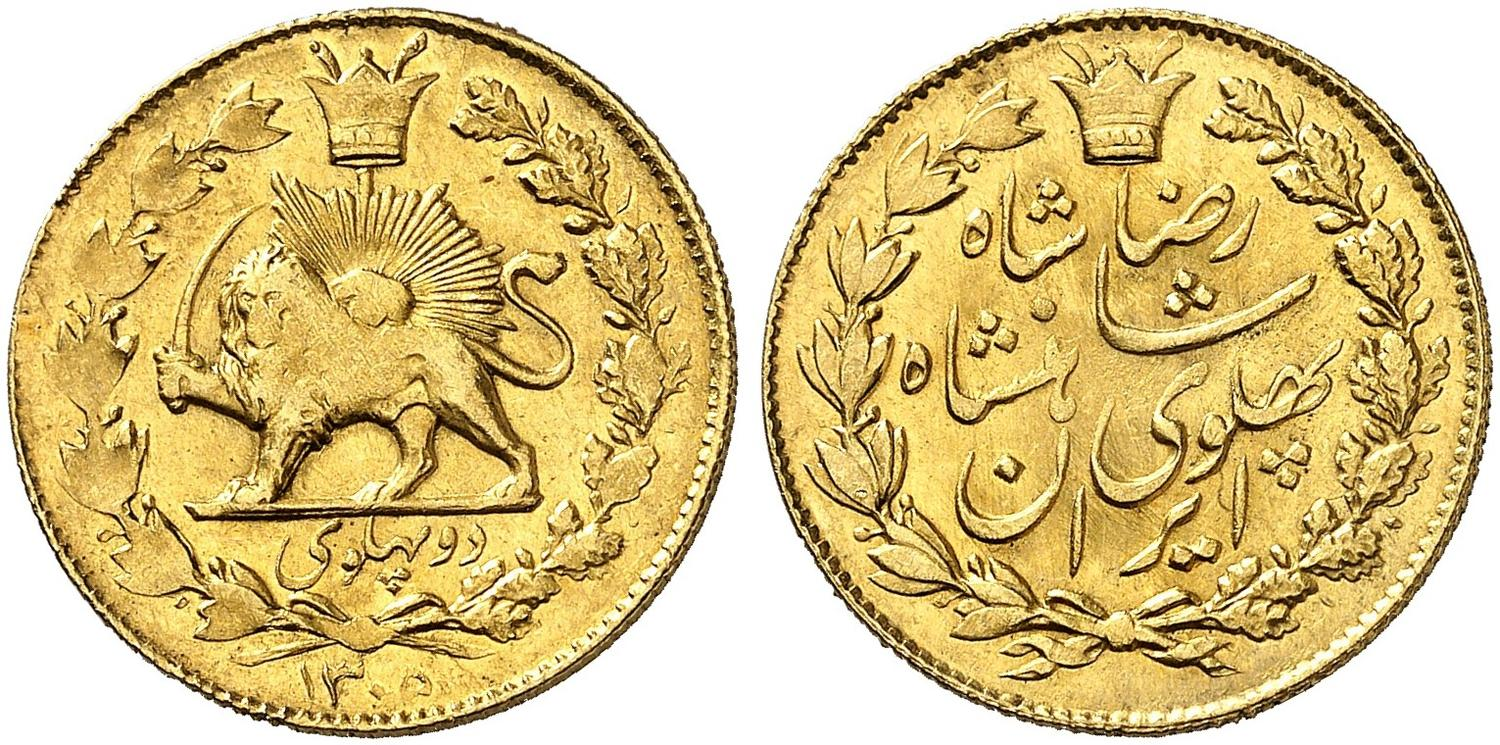
Two Pahlavi Coin (legend type) of Reza Shah

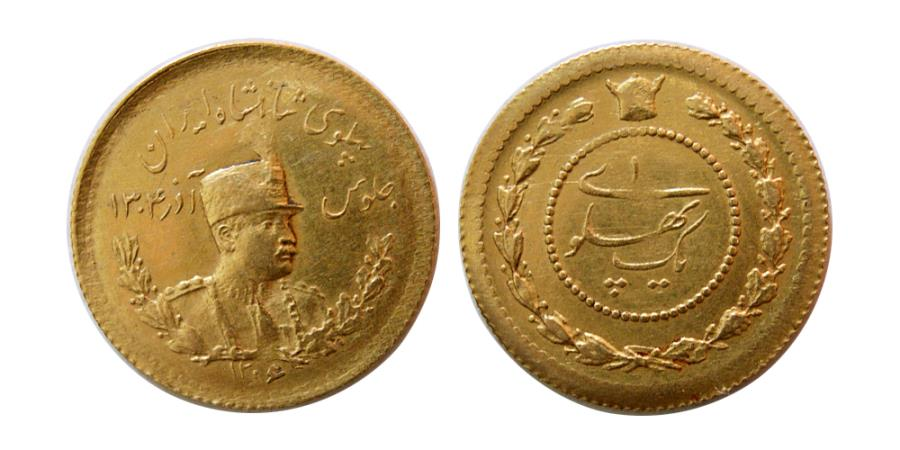
One Pahlavi 1st type (portrait)

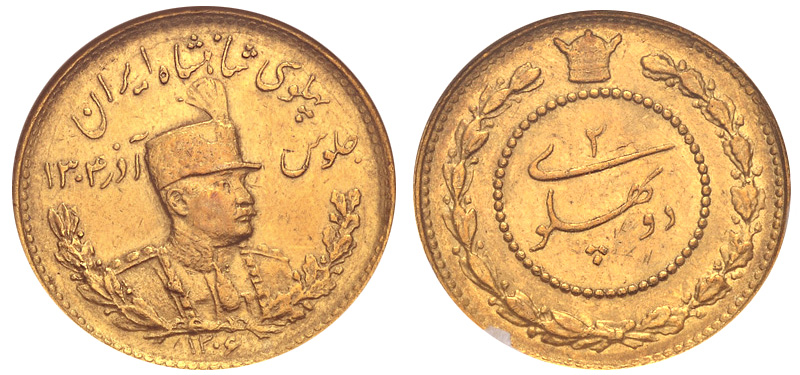
Two Pahlavi (portrait type)

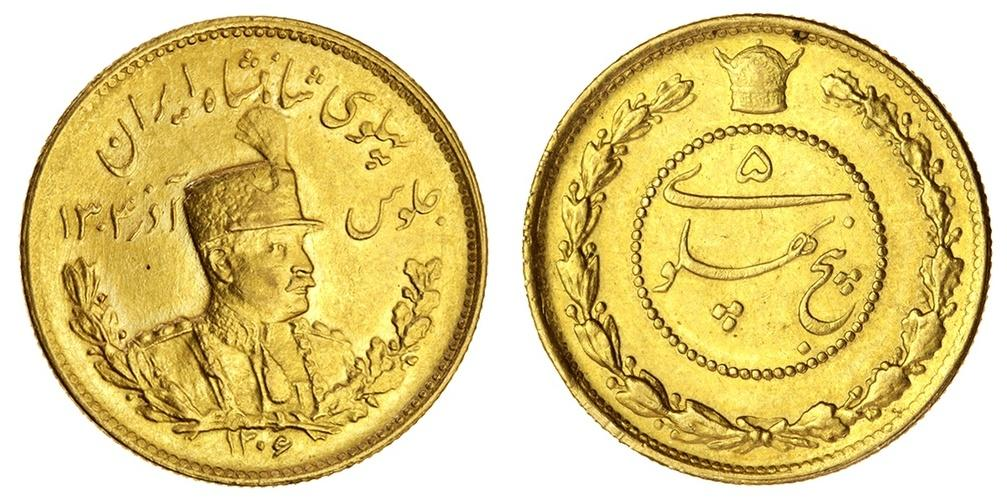
Five Pahlavi of Reza Shah (Portrait)

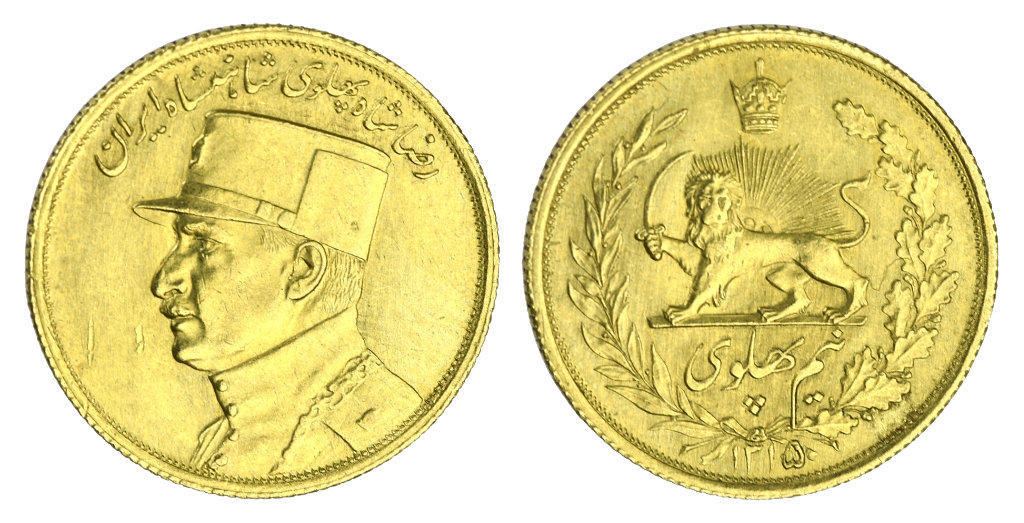
Half Pahlavi coin of Reza Shah

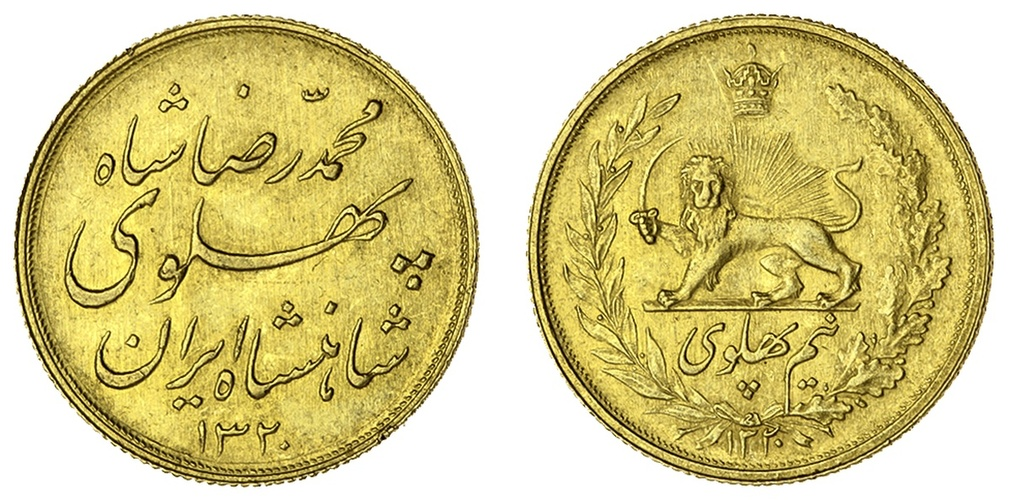
Half Pahlavi (legend)

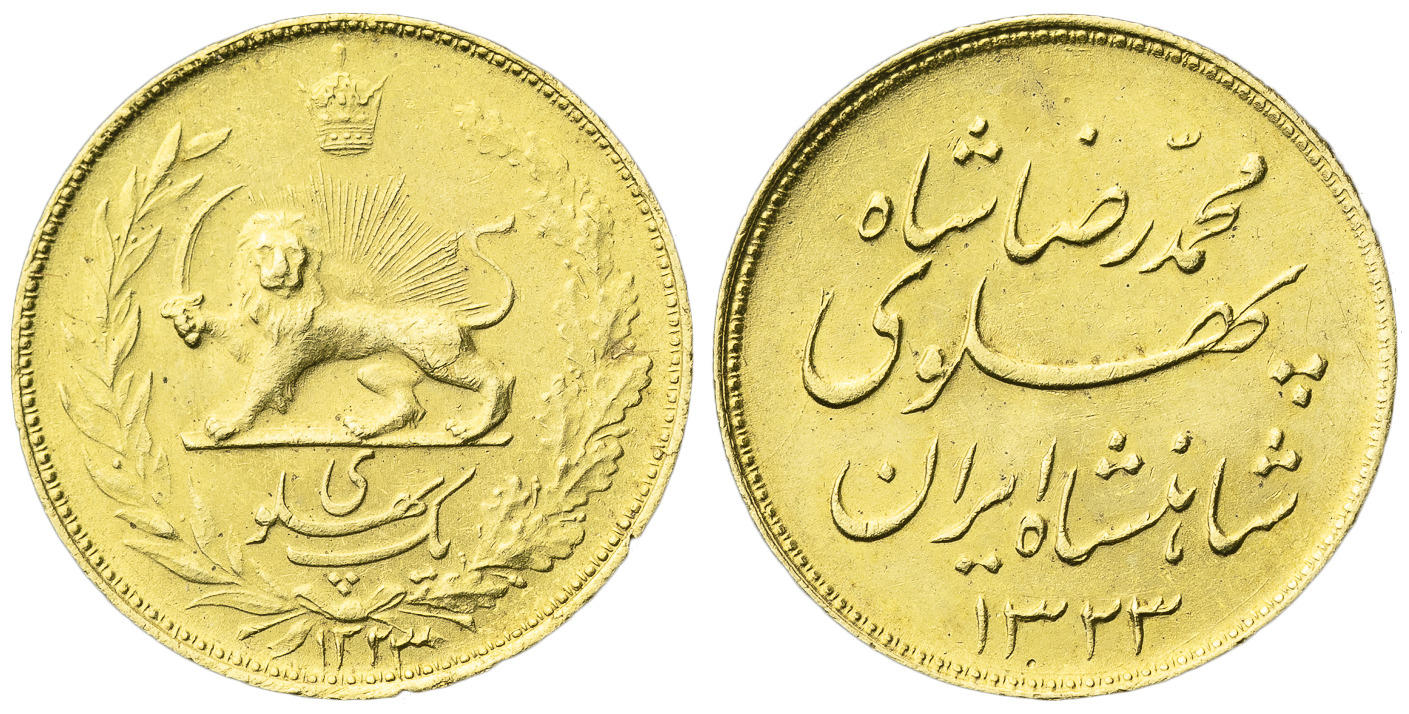
One Pahlavi (legend)

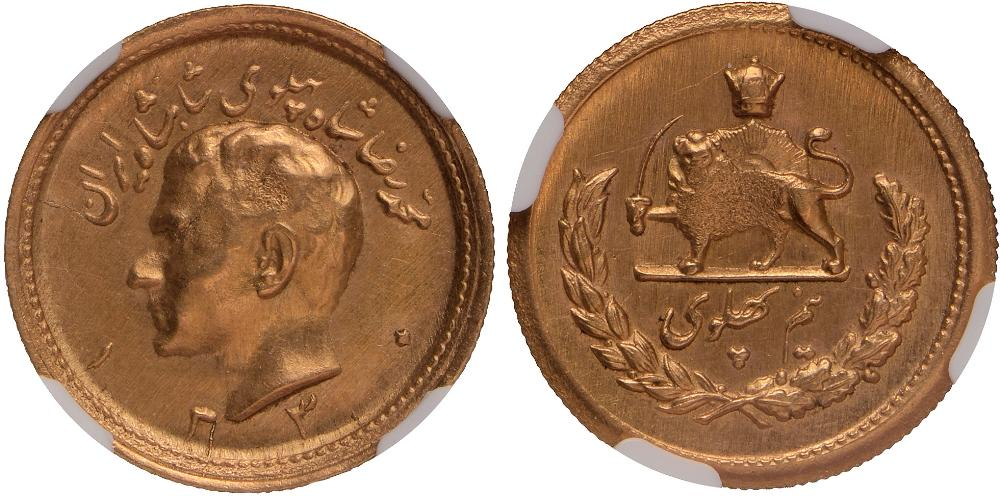
Half Pahlavi (high relief)

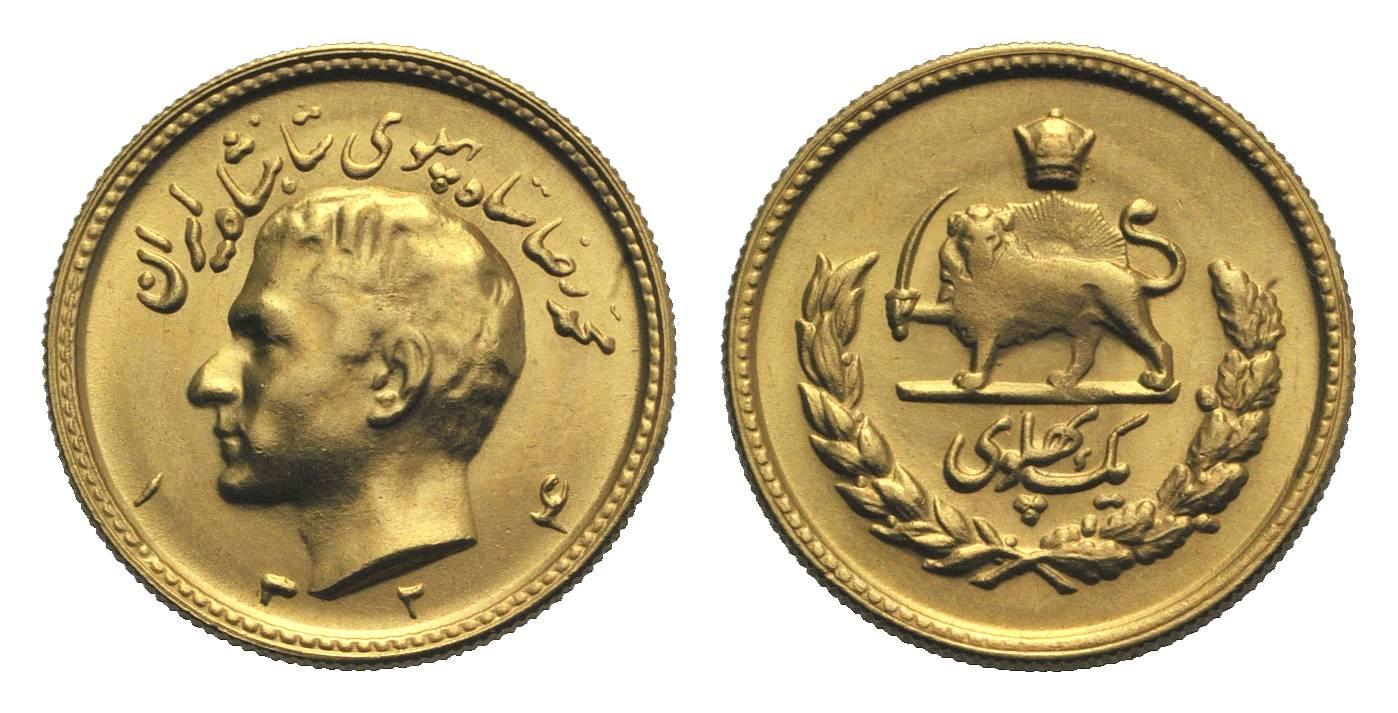
One Pahlavi (high relief)

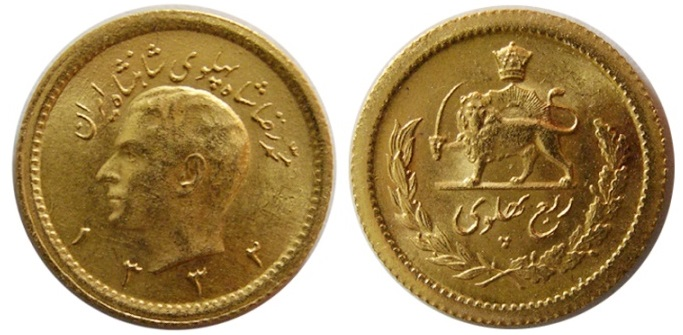
Quarter Pahlavi (14mm)

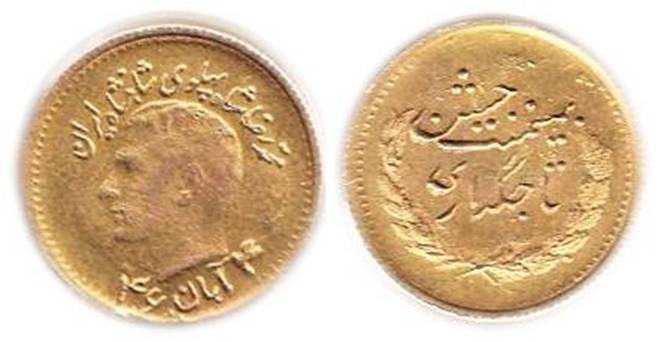
Commemorative Quarter Pahlavi Coin for Coronation

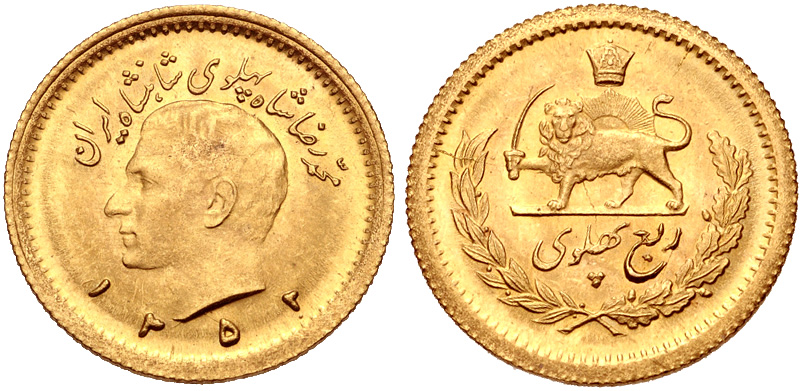
Quarter Pahlavi

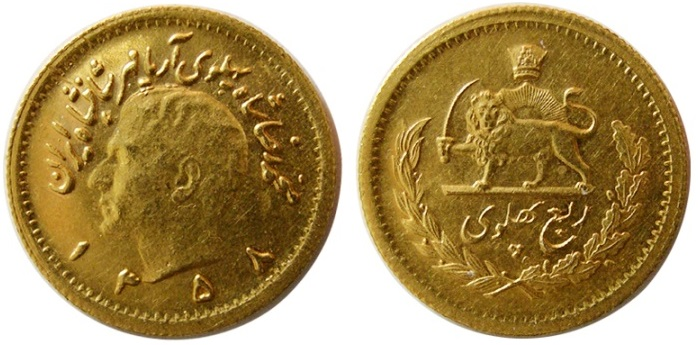
Quarter Pahlavi (Aryamehr)

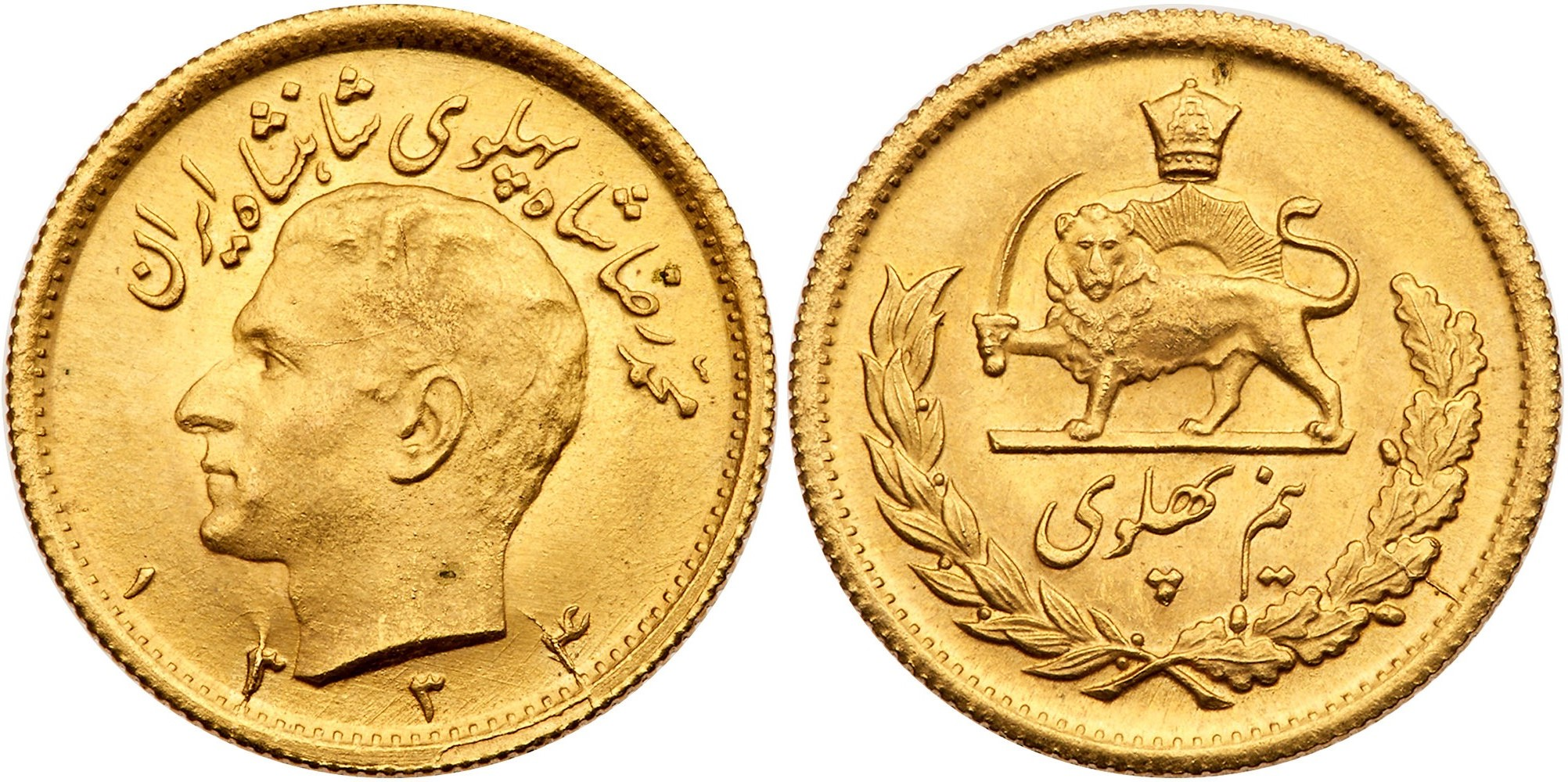
Half Pahlavi

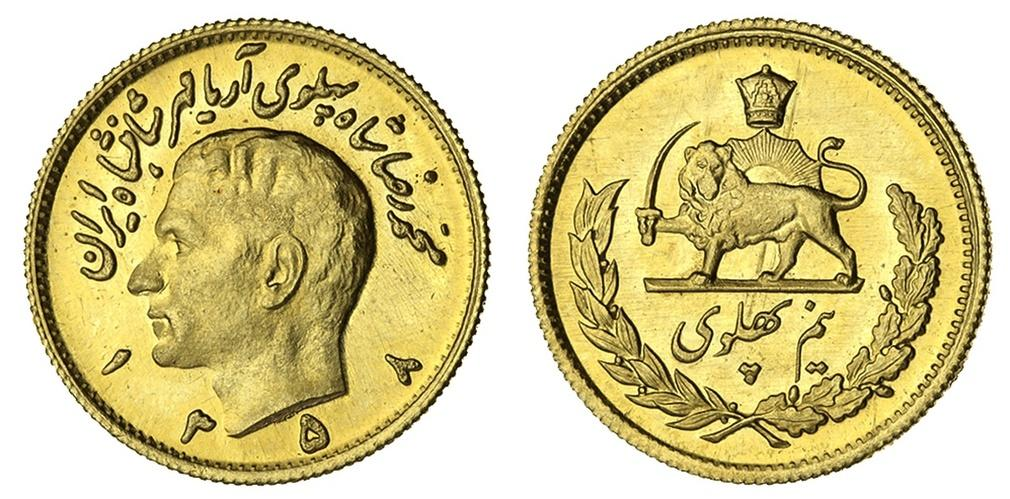
Half Pahlavi (Aryamehr)

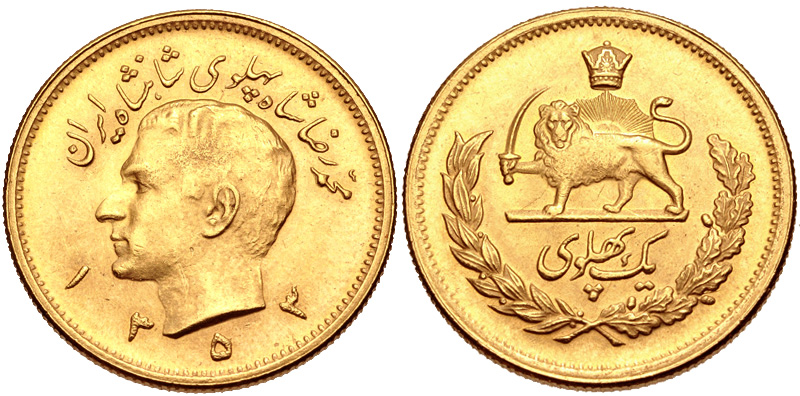
One Pahlavi

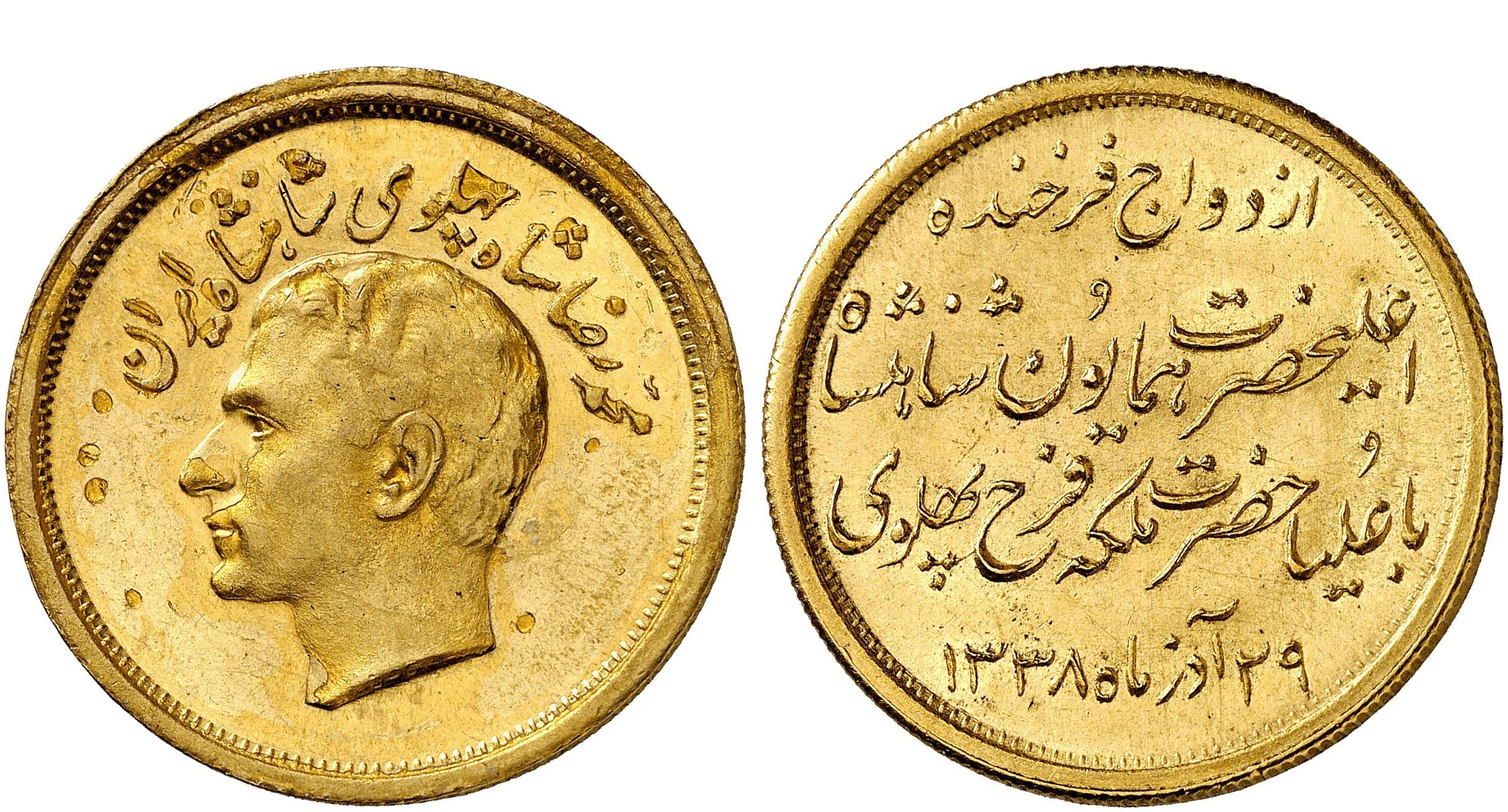
Two and Half Pahlavi (Royal wedding)

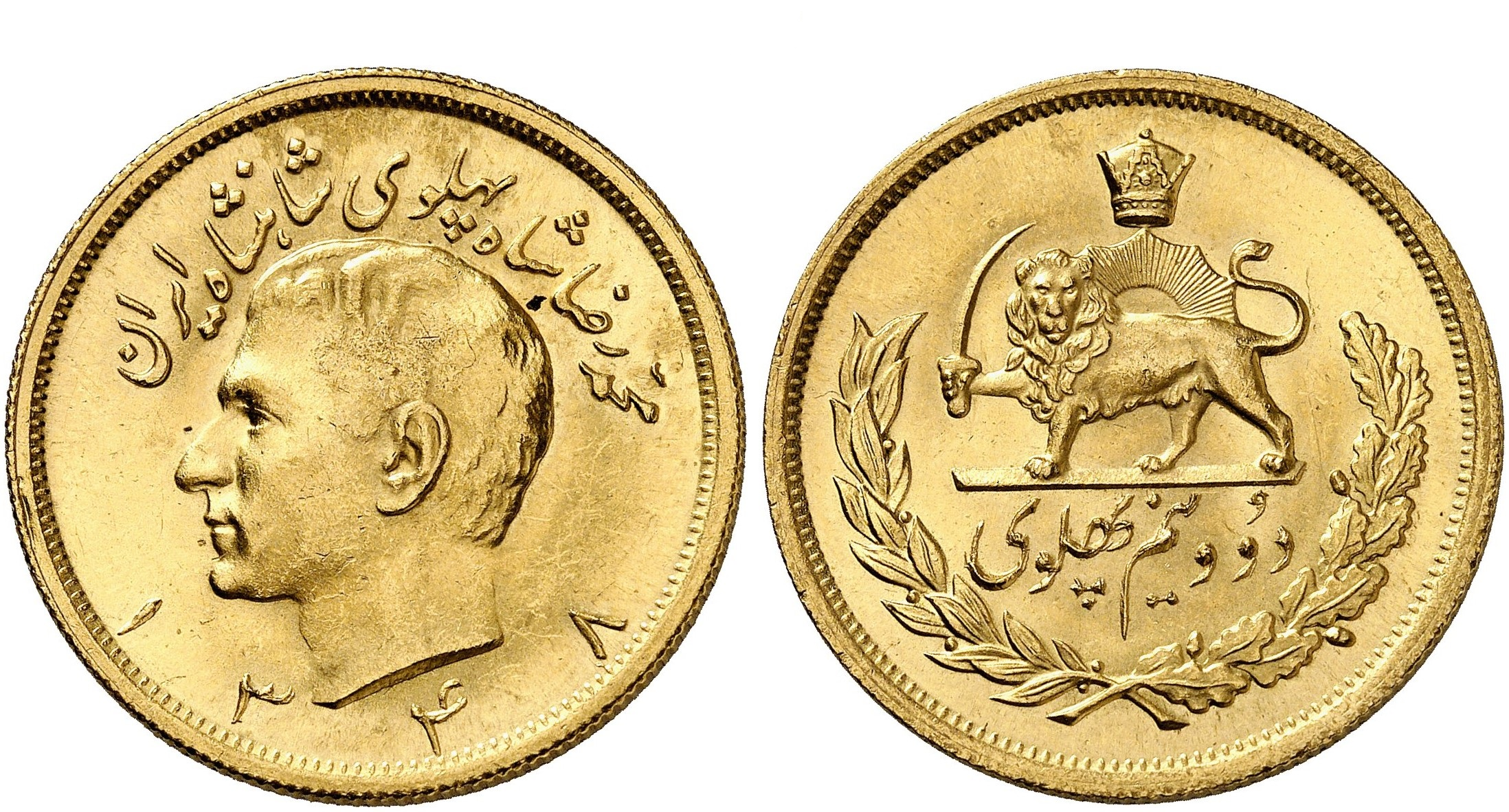
Two and Half Pahlavi

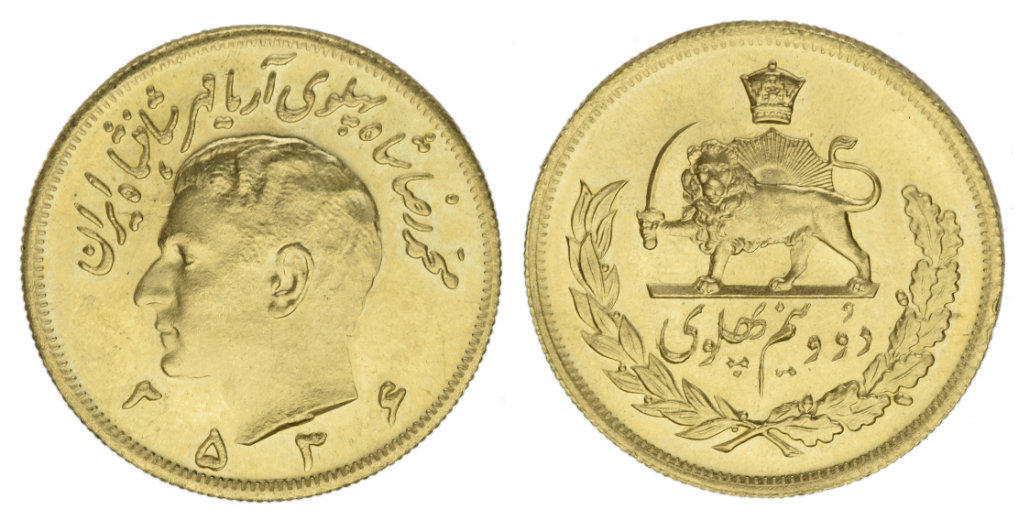
Two and Half Pahlavi (Aryamehr)

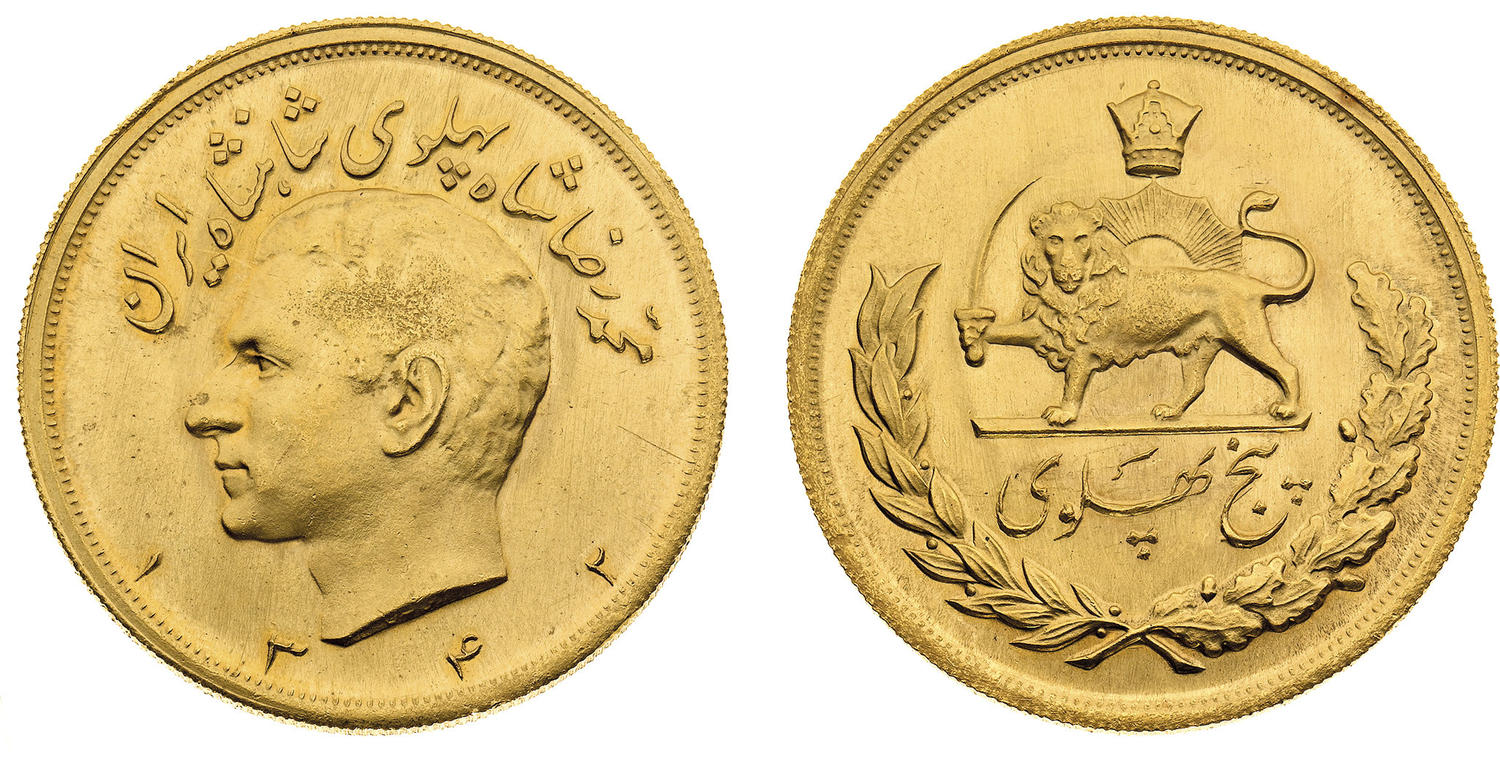
Five Pahlavi

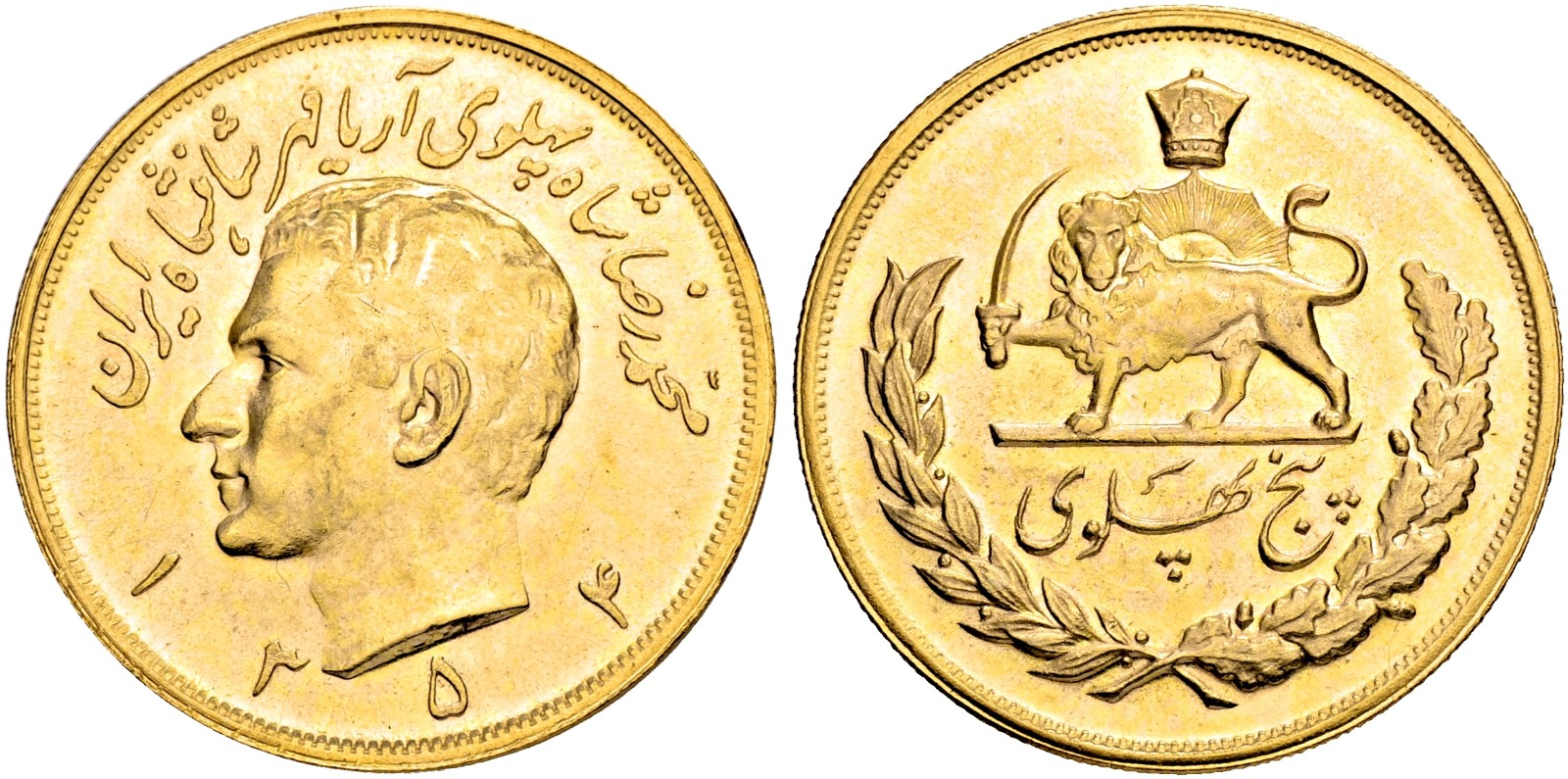
Five Pahlavi (Aryamehr)

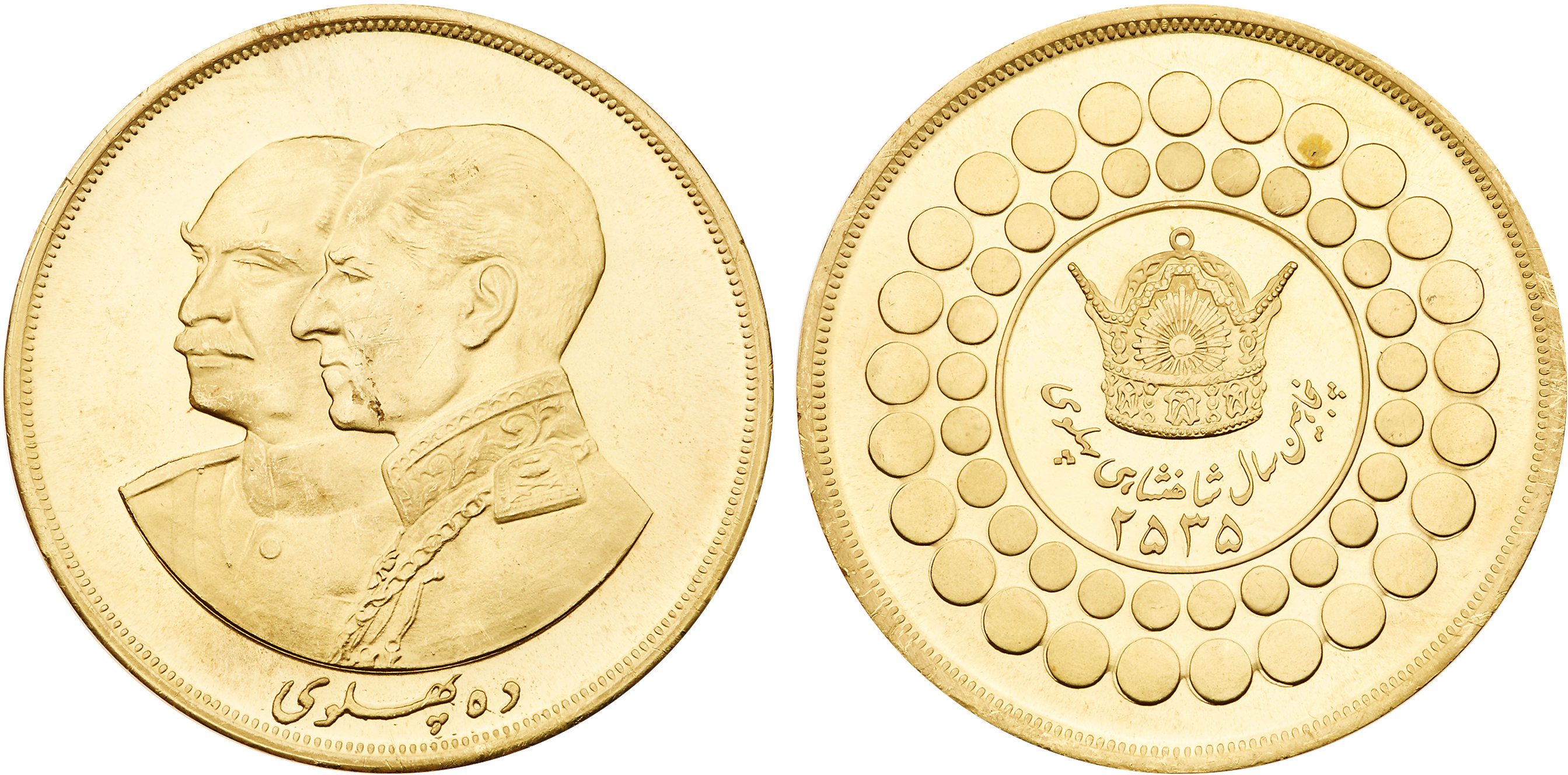
Ten Pahlavi (50th anniversary of Pahlavi Reign)

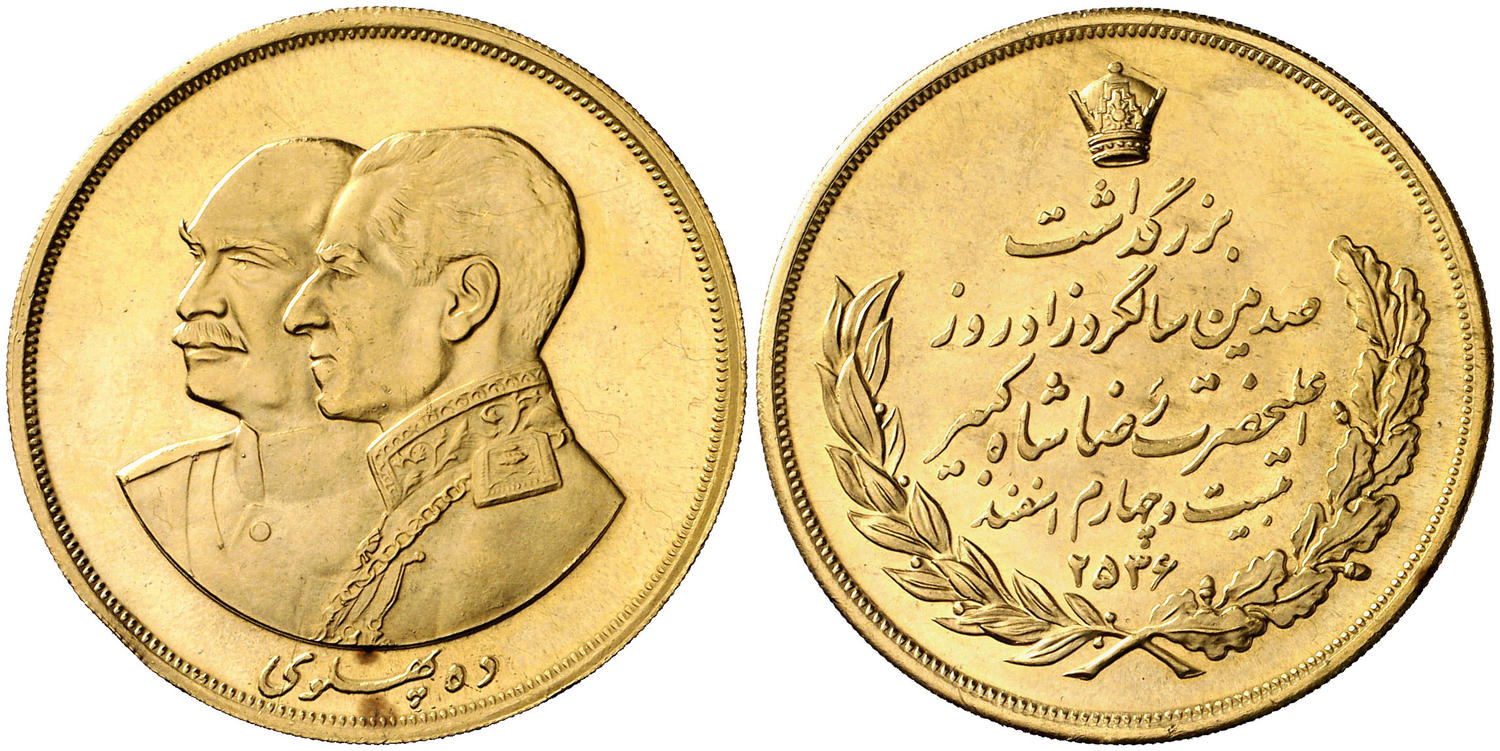
Ten Pahlavi (100th anniversary of Reza Shah birth)

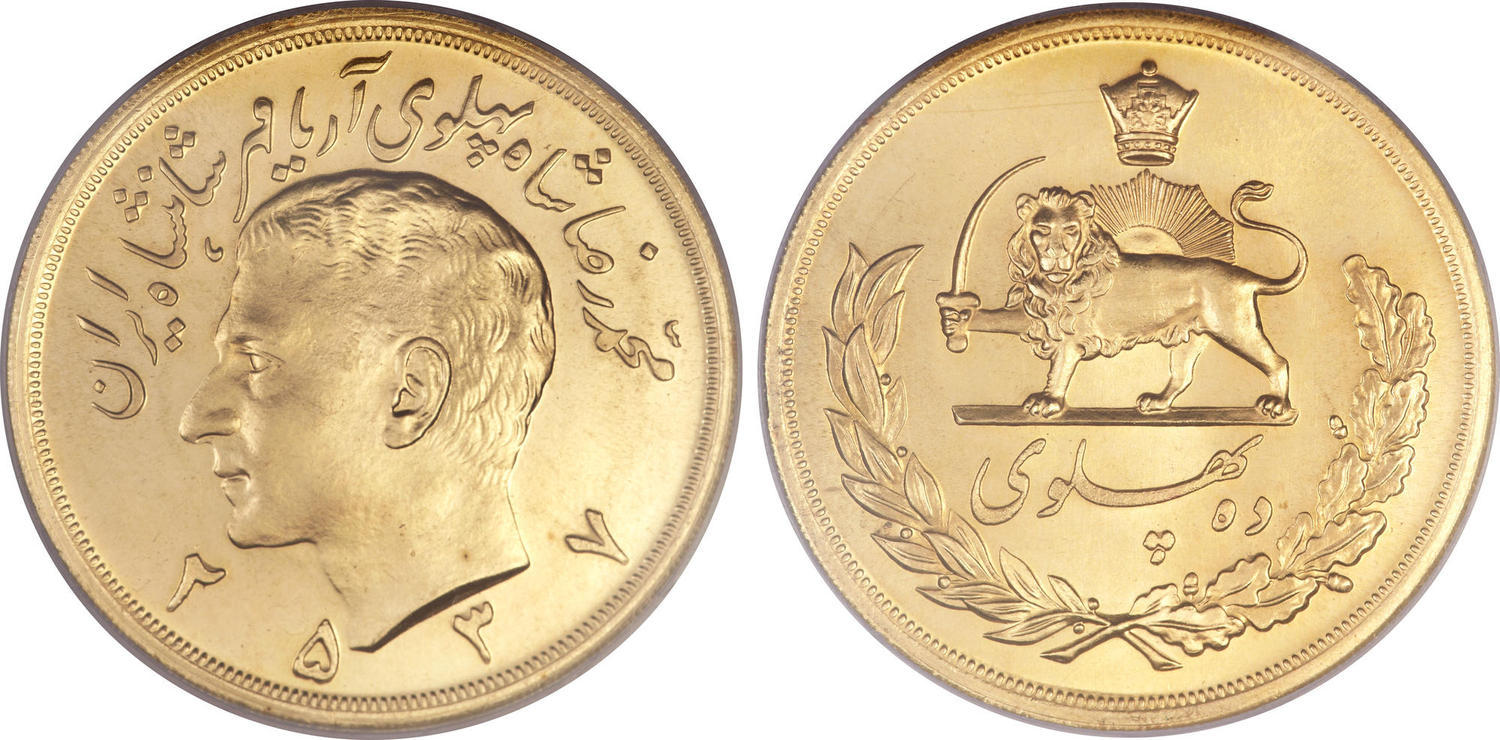
Ten Pahlavi with Imperial Date

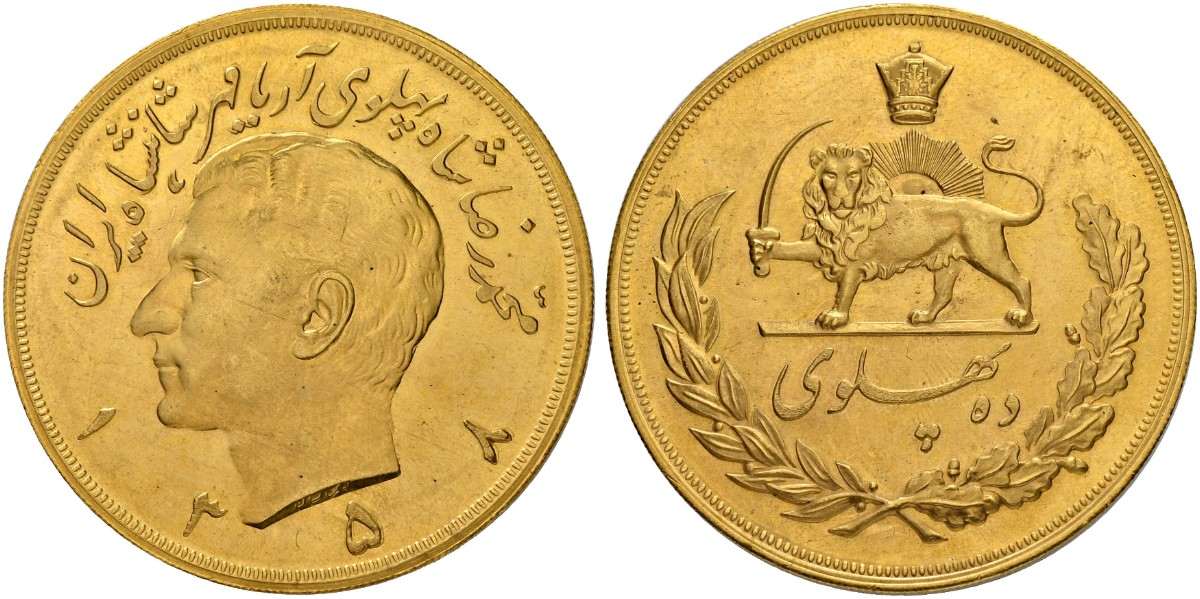
Ten Pahlavi with Solar Hijri Date
