= Shahanshahi calendar =

Official calendar of Iran from 1976 to 1978

The Shahanshahi calendar (Persian: گاه‌شماری شاهنشاهی, romanized: Gāhshomāri-ye Shāhanshāhi, lit. 'Imperial Calendar') was the official calendar of Pahlavi Iran from 1976 to 1978. It was declared as the official calendar of Iran on March 14, 1976, following a joint session of the National Consultative Assembly and the Senate. Prior to this, the Solar Hijri calendar was used as the official calendar of the country. This legislation changed the epoch of the solar calendar from the Hijrah to the coronation of Cyrus the Great. According to this calendar, the year 1 of the Shahanshahi era corresponds to 559 BCE, and the year 2500 of the Shahanshahi era coincides with 1942 CE.

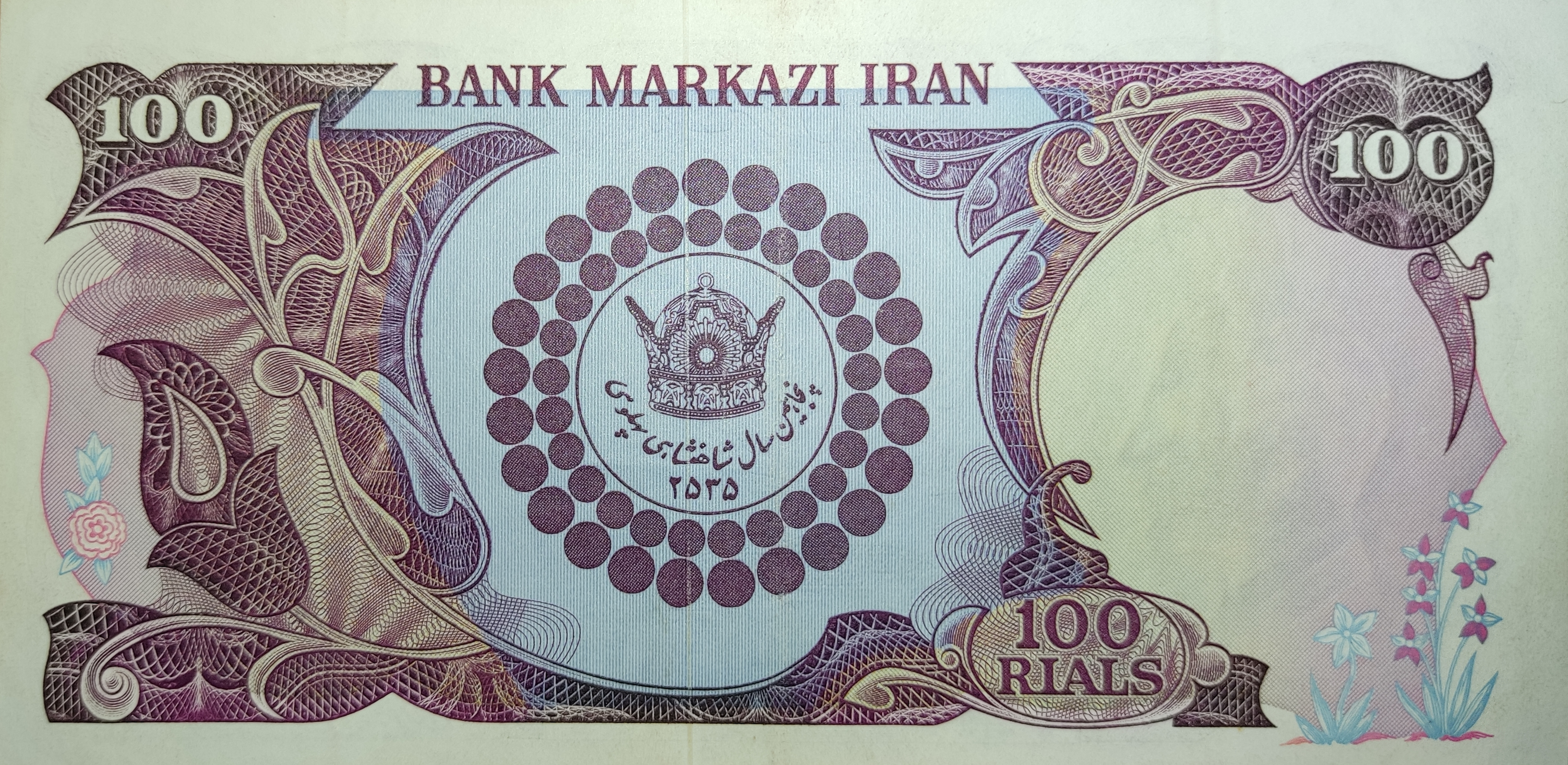
Commemorative banknote for the 50th anniversary of the Pahlavi reign, printed in the Shahanshahi year 2535 (1976 CE)

== Adoption ==
The idea of changing the epoch of the Iranian calendar was not new to the Pahlavi government. As early as 1967, Mohammad Farahmand proposed the idea to Hushang Ansary, who was then Iran's Ambassador to the United States and later became Minister of Tourism and Information. The idea, as proposed by Mohammad Farahmand, argued that the calendar used by Iranians was not a Persian calendar and therefore a disgrace to Iranian identity. Farahmand insisted that Iranians should have their own distinct calendar. He suggested that the most appropriate event to mark the beginning of a truly Iranian calendar would be the coronation of Cyrus the Great. Farahmand believed that the world would understand and applaud this choice, as Cyrus was not only a great king but also the first ruler to introduce a concept of human rights, exemplified by the Cyrus Cylinder. Ansary presented the proposal to Prime Minister Amir Abbas Hoveyda, but it was dismissed as irrelevant and untimely. Hoveyda reportedly stated, “We have more problems than we can handle. It is not at all a good thing to bring up something like this. Make it go away.”

However, after the 2,500-year celebration of the Persian Empire in October 1971, which reignited enthusiasm for reviving Iran's ancient history, the idea of changing the calendar's epoch was revisited. This time, the proposal gained traction and was ultimately accepted.

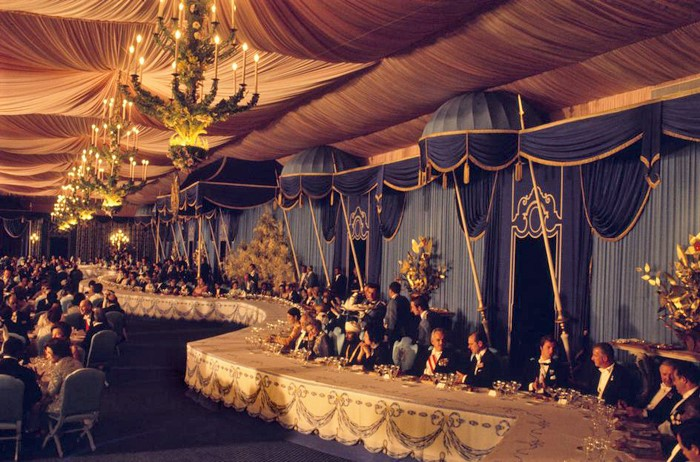
The dinner ceremony of the 2,500-year celebration of the Persian Empire

Three experts played a significant role in this decision: Shojaddin Shafa, Deputy of the Imperial Court; Hadi Hedayati, Executive Deputy of the Prime Minister; and Khosrow Behrouz, Deputy of the Planning Organization and Head of the Informatics Office.

These experts argued that the Solar Hijri calendar was "neither national nor Islamic; it lacks an Islamic basis, as the religious calendar for all Muslims worldwide is the Islamic calendar. Iranians also determine their religious holidays, mourning ceremonies, fasting, and Hajj according to the Islamic calendar. Meanwhile, the Solar Hijri calendar is not commonly used or recognized in any Islamic country." They further claimed that the solar calendar lacked a national basis, as it was established during the caliphate of Al-Mu'tadid, the Abbasid caliph, to "resolve issues related to collecting taxes from Iranians and to fix Nowruz in a season suitable for tax collection." In their view, this calendar was a relic of foreign domination over Iran and thus had no national significance. Another reason was that since the history of Iranian kingship dated back 2,500 years, the Solar Hijri calendar could not cover the entire history of Iran. For example, to determine the date of Cyrus the Great's coronation, the year "559 BCE" had to be used.

For these reasons, the change was put on the agenda, and three proposals were presented:

1. Shojaddin Shafa's Proposal: The year 539 BCE, the year of Cyrus the Great's conquest of Babylon and the issuance of the Cyrus Cylinder, should be the starting point of the Shahanshahi calendar. However, this proposal still could not cover the period before that, such as Cyrus's coronation, which would still require the use of BCE dates. Moreover, this date marked the beginning of a war, which did not have a positive connotation.
2. Hadi Hedayati's Proposal: The year 559 BCE, the year of Cyrus the Great's coronation, should be the starting point of the calendar. He argued that Cyrus's coronation marked the beginning of Iranian kingship and the unification of the Medes and Persians. Another reason for this proposal was that the year of Mohammad Reza Pahlavi's ascension to the throne would align with the round number 2500 in the new calendar. If accepted, adding the round number 1180 to the Solar Hijri calendar would easily convert dates to the Imperial calendar. With the approval of this law, the year 1355 Solar Hijri coincided with the year 2535 of the Imperial calendar.
3. Khosrow Behrouz's Proposal: The year of Cyrus the Great's birth should be the starting point of the Imperial calendar. However, the issue with this proposal was that Cyrus's birth year was speculative, whereas his coronation date was confirmed in most historical sources.

Ultimately, it was decided that the Shahanshahi calendar would use the date of Cyrus the Great's coronation as its starting point instead of the Hijri calendar. It was also decided that the Islamic calendar would continue to be used as the religious calendar for Iranians, particularly by the clergy, alongside the Shahanshahi calendar, while the Gregorian calendar would be used for international relations.

== Year conversion ==
The method for converting the Solar Hijri year to the Shahanshahi year is as follows:

Shahanshahi Year = 1180 + Solar Hijri Year

The method for converting the Gregorian year to the Shahanshahi year is as follows:

Shahanshahi Year = 559 + Gregorian Year

In converting the Solar Hijri year to the Shahanshahi year, the number 1180 is used. This means that 1,180 years before the migration of Muhammad, the Prophet of Islam, from Mecca to Medina, Cyrus the Great had ascended to the throne. Interestingly, this number coincidentally turned out to be a perfectly round figure. This method is simpler than the Gregorian conversion.

In converting the Gregorian year to the Shahanshahi year, the number 559 is used. This means that 558 years before the birth of Jesus Christ, Cyrus the Achaemenid had become king. However, there is a difference: for the first three months of the Gregorian year (January, February, and March), which coincide with the winter of the previous Solar Hijri year, the number 558 must be added to the Gregorian year. This is because the Gregorian New Year begins in winter, which conflicts with the Iranian New Year, which starts in spring.

== Reversion ==
It is said that many people struggled to connect with the Shahanshahi calendar used by the government in official documents, and ordinary citizens found it difficult to perform calculations based on this calendar. For example, they could not easily determine that the Solar Hijri year 1356 corresponded to the Imperial year 2536. Ultimately, on August 27, 1978 (5 Shahrivar 1357 Solar Hijri), Jafar Sharif-Emami, in an effort to form a "National Reconciliation Government," issued a directive on his first day as Prime Minister to revert Iran's calendar from the Shahanshahi calendar back to the Solar Hijri calendar.
