= Septembers of Shiraz =

- Theatrical release poster
- Directed by: Wayne Blair
- Written by: Hanna Weg
- Based on: The Septembers of Shiraz by Dalia Sofer
- Produced by: Gerard Butler; Danielle Robinson; Alan Siegel; Hanna Weg
- Starring: Adrien Brody; Salma Hayek; Shohreh Aghdashloo; Anthony Azizi; Bashar Rahal; Alon Aboutboul
- Cinematography: Warwick Thornton
- Edited by: John Scott
- Music by: Mark Isham
- Production companies: G-BASE; Millennium Films
- Distributed by: Momentum Pictures
- Release dates: September 15, 2015 (TIFF); June 24, 2016 (United States)
- Running time: 109 minutes
- Country: United States
- Language: English

Septembers of Shiraz (released as Enemy Territory in Canada, and Insurrection in France) is a 2015 American drama film directed by Wayne Blair and written by Hanna Weg. It is based on the 2007 novel The Septembers of Shiraz by Dalia Sofer. The film stars Adrien Brody, Salma Hayek, Shohreh Aghdashloo, Anthony Azizi, Bashar Rahal and Alon Aboutboul. The film was released on June 24, 2016, by Momentum Pictures.

== Plot ==
During the first months after the 1979 Iranian Revolution, wealthy Jewish Iranian gemologist Isaac Amin is suddenly arrested at his office in Tehran by the Revolutionary Guards who take him to prison.

During his prison days, Isaac meets fellow prisoners of different backgrounds, who are tortured and finally prosecuted. In interrogation sessions, his interrogator Mohsen, once torturing him with a lit cigarette and having him lashed, refers to the injustice of being affluent and to the justice that the revolution is bringing to the oppressed.

After the guards scare him by putting him before a firing squad and shooting around his body, he says to Mohsen that he is ready to pay all his savings to the new Islamic regime in order to have a chance at freedom. After emptying his bank account, Mohsen declares him free and leaves him alone in the street.

Isaac goes to his office, now deserted, and recovers a hidden pack of diamonds from behind a brick in the wall. As he prepares to leave, he sees Morteza, a former employee of the office and son of their housekeeper Habibeh. He had already directed the stealing of Isaac's gems and office equipment, wandering in the corridor.

Morteza asks for more and shows Isaac a letter of compliment that Shahbanu Farah Pahlavi had written to him, as blackmail. Isaac tells him that he is now a contributor to the revolution and can eliminate Morteza with a single phone call. Morteza leaves.

Isaac is referred to a human smuggler and pays him in diamonds worth over 150,000 to smuggle them out of Iran. In the meantime, Morteza gives the letter to Mohsen at a Revolutionary Guards office but is himself arrested for earlier stealing the stones from Amin´s premises.

The Amin family begin their treacherous journey at dawn the next morning. First, Isaac bypasses a checkpoint, getting chased on motorcycle and shakes the last by braking hard so the rider crashes his bike into the bumper so he flies headfirst over the car. At the rendezvous, they are driven in their Mercedes until they change to an old pickup through a rough road.

Now night, they go on horseback and through the forest to the border, but are stopped by a crew alerted by Morteza. They ring Mohsen, who tells the rebels to let the Amins go. When alone, he reflects over the letter and burns it. Isaac and his family make it over the border to Turkey.

== Cast ==
- Adrien Brody as Isaac Amin
- Salma Hayek as Farnaz Amin
- Shohreh Aghdashloo as Habibeh
- Anthony Azizi as Mehdi
- Bashar Rahal as Komiteh Member
- Alon Aboutboul as Mohsen
- Wadih Dona as Rostam
- Nasser Memarzia as Mansoor
- Navid Navid as Morteza
- Velislav Pavlov as Hossein
- Jamie Ward as Parviz Amin
- Ariana Molkara as Shirin

== Production ==
On February 7, 2014, Salma Hayek and Shohreh Aghdashloo joined the cast. On April 9, 2014, Adrien Brody joined the cast. Principal photography began on June 9, 2014. The film was shot in Bulgaria.

== Release ==
The film premiered at the 2015 Toronto International Film Festival on September 15, 2015. It was selected as the opening night film for the San Diego International Film Festival on September 30, 2015. The film was released on June 24, 2016, by Momentum Pictures.

== Reception ==
Septembers of Shiraz received middling to negative reviews from critics. On Rotten Tomatoes, the film has an approval rating of 31%, based on 13 reviews, with an average rating of 4.20/10. On Metacritic, the film has a score of 16 out of 100, based on 5 critics, indicating overwhelming dislike.
