= Dalia Sofer =

Iranian-born American writer (born 1972)

- Born: 1972 (age 53–54); Tehran, Iran
- Occupation: Writer
- Writing career
- Notable work: The Septembers of Shiraz
- Website: On Harper Collins

Dalia Sofer (Persian: دالیا سوفر, born 1972) is an Iranian-born American writer.

== Early life and education ==
Born in Tehran, Iran, she was raised in a Jewish family during revolutionary Iran. At age 11 she moved to New York City. Later she studied French literature at NYU with a minor in creative writing. She received an MFA from Sarah Lawrence College. Her first novel, The Septembers of Shiraz, was published in 2007. A film adaption, starring Adrien Brody and Salma Hayek in the lead roles, was released in 2015.

== Awards and recognition ==
Sofer is the recipient of the 2008 PEN/Robert W. Bingham Prize for The Septembers of Shiraz. She has also won a 2007 Whiting Award for fiction, and has been a resident at Yaddo.

== Books ==
- The Septembers of Shiraz (2007)
- Man of My Time (2020)

== See also ==
- List of Iranian women writers and poets
