= Iranian Revolution =

Revolution in Iran from 1978 to 1979

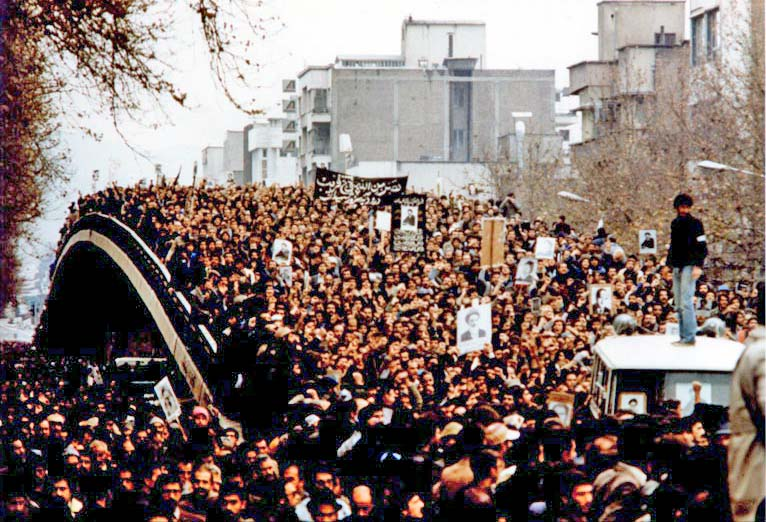
- Mass demonstrations of people protesting against the Shah and the Pahlavi government on the day of Ashura on 11 December 1978 at College Bridge, Tehran
- Date: 7 January 1978 – 11 February 1979 (1 year, 1 month and 4 days)
- Location: Imperial State of Iran
- Caused by: Discontent with Mohammad Reza Pahlavi's rule; Repression and torture of dissidents; Exile of Ruhollah Khomeini (Shia Islamist faction); and others
- Goals: Overthrow of the Pahlavi dynasty
- Methods: Demonstrations; Strikes; Civil resistance; Riots; Rebellion; Armed street fighting
- Result: Establishment of the Islamic Republic of Iran

Parties
Imperial State of Iran Royalist groups: Regency Council (Note: Regency Council was practically dissolved on 22 January 1979, when its head resigned to meet Ruhollah Khomeini.); Rastakhiz Party (until 1 November 1978); Imperial Army (Note: Imperial Iranian Army revoked their allegiance to the throne and declared neutrality on 11 February 1979.); Imperial Guard; SAVAK; Shahrbani; Gendarmerie	Revolutionary Council Islamist opposition: Combatant Clergy Association; Fada'iyan-e Islam; Freedom Movement of Iran; Islamic Association of Students; Islamic Association of Teachers; Islamic Association of Engineers; Islamic Association of Physicians; Islamic Coalition Societies; JAMA; Mojahedin; Movement of Militant Muslims; Liberal, socialist and communist opposition: National Front; Mojahedin-e-Khalq; Fadaiyan-e-Khalq; Tudeh Party; Peykar; Sarbedaran; Razmandegan; Worker's Way; Democratic Party of Iranian Kurdistan; Other opposition: Confederation of Iranian Students

Lead figures
Mohammad Reza Pahlavi; Jamshid Amouzegar; Jafar Sharif-Emami; Gholam Reza Azhari; Shapour Bakhtiar; Abbas Gharabaghi; Gholam Ali Oveissi; Nasser Moghaddam (executed); Mehdi Rahimi (executed)	Ruhollah Khomeini; Mehdi Bazargan; Morteza Motahhari; Mahmoud Taleghani; Karim Sanjabi

Casualties and losses
- See Casualties of the Iranian Revolution

The Iranian Revolution, (Note: See #Names section) also known as the Islamic Revolution, culminated in the overthrow of the Pahlavi dynasty in 1979. The revolution led to the replacement of the Imperial State of Iran by the Islamic Republic of Iran, as the monarchical government of Shah Mohammad Reza Pahlavi was superseded by Ruhollah Khomeini, an Islamist cleric who had headed one of the rebel factions, and became the country’s supreme leader.The ousting of Mohammad Reza Pahlavi, the last Shah of Iran, formally marked the end of Iran's historical monarchy.

In 1953, the CIA and MI6-backed 1953 Iranian coup d'état overthrew Iran's prime minister, Mohammad Mossadegh, who had nationalized the Anglo-Persian Oil Company. The coup reinstated Mohammad Reza Pahlavi as an absolute monarch and significantly increased the level of influence of the United States over Iran.

In 1963, the Shah had launched the White Revolution, a top-down modernization and land reform program that alienated many sectors of society, especially the clergy. Khomeini emerged as a vocal critic and was exiled in 1964. However, as ideological tensions persisted between Pahlavi and Khomeini, anti-government demonstrations began in October 1977, developing into a campaign of civil resistance that included communists, socialists, and Islamists. Mass protests were underway. A key turning point occurred on 19 August 1978, when the Cinema Rex fire by Islamic militants killed around 400 people. However a large portion of the public believed it was a false flag operation by SAVAK, the Shah's secret police, to discredit the opposition and justify a crackdown, fueling nationwide outrage and mobilization. By the end of 1978, the revolution had become a broad-based uprising that paralyzed the country for the remainder of that year.

On 16 January 1979, Pahlavi left Iran for exile, leaving his duties to Iran's Regency Council and Shapour Bakhtiar, the opposition-based prime minister. On 1 February 1979, Khomeini returned, following an invitation by the government; several million greeted him as he landed in Tehran. By 11 February, the monarchy was brought down and Khomeini assumed leadership while guerrillas and rebel troops overwhelmed Pahlavi loyalists in armed combat. Following the March 1979 Islamic Republic referendum, in which 98% approved the shift to an Islamic republic, the new government began drafting the present-day constitution of the Islamic Republic of Iran; Khomeini emerged as the absolute supreme leader of Iran in December 1979.

The revolution was fueled by widespread perceptions of the Shah's regime as corrupt, repressive, and overly reliant on foreign powers, particularly the United States and the United Kingdom, at the expense of Iran's sovereignty and cultural identity. However others perceived the revolution's success as unusual, since it lacked customary causes of revolutionary sentiment, e.g. defeat in war, financial crisis, peasant rebellion, or disgruntled military. It occurred in a country experiencing relative prosperity, produced profound change at great speed, and resulted in a massive exile that characterizes a large portion of Iranian diaspora, and replaced a pro-Western secular but authoritarian monarchy with an anti-Western Islamic republic based on the concept of Velâyat-e Faqih (Guardianship of the Islamic Jurist), straddling between authoritarianism and totalitarianism. In addition to declaring the destruction of Israel as a core objective, post-revolutionary Iran aimed to undermine the influence of Sunni leaders in the region by supporting Shi'ite political ascendancy and exporting Khomeinist doctrines abroad. In the aftermath of the revolution, Iran began to back Shia militancy across the region to expand its influence in the Arab world, seeking to establish an Iranian-led Shia political and military order in the Middle East.

== Names ==
While the name "Iranian Revolution" (Note: Persian: انقلاب ایران, Enqelâb-e Irân [ʔeɴɢeˌlɒːbe ʔiːɾɒːn]) is common, it is also referred to as the 1979 Revolution, the Islamic Revolution (Note: انقلاب اسلامی, Enqelâb-e Eslâmī) or the Islamic Revolution of 1979.

== Background (1891–1977) ==
Reasons advanced for the revolution and its populist, nationalist, and later Shia Islamic character include:

1. A backlash against forced Westernization and imperialism;
2. The 1953 Iranian coup d'état;
3. A rise in expectations created by the 1973 oil revenue windfall;
4. An overly ambitious economic program;
5. Autocratic Rule;
6. Anger over a short, sharp economic contraction in 1977–1978; and (Note: According to Kurzman, scholars writing on the revolution who have mentioned this include: Gary Sick; Michael M. J. Fischer; Nikkie R. Keddie; Shaul Bakhash)
7. Other shortcomings of the previous regime.

The Shah's regime was seen as oppressive, brutal, corrupt, and lavish by some of the society's classes at that time. It also suffered from functional failures that brought economic bottlenecks, shortages, and inflation. The Shah was perceived by many as beholden to—if not a puppet of—a non-Muslim Western power (i.e., the United States) whose culture was affecting that of Iran. At the same time, support for the Shah may have waned among Western politicians and media—especially under the administration of US President Jimmy Carter—as a result of the Shah's support for OPEC petroleum price increases earlier in the decade. When President Carter enacted a human rights policy which said that countries guilty of human rights violations would be deprived of American arms or aid, this helped give some Iranians the courage to post open letters and petitions in the hope that the repression by the government might subside.

The revolution that substituted the monarchy of Mohammad Reza Pahlavi with Islam and Khomeini is credited in part to the spread of the Shi'a version of the Islamic revival. While often described mainly as a religious revolt, the revolution also grew from a mix of nationalist goals, political populism, and religious radicalism. It resisted westernization and saw Ayatollah Khomeini as following in the footsteps of the Shi'a Imam Husayn ibn Ali, with the Shah playing the role of Husayn's foe, the hated tyrant Yazid I. Other factors include the underestimation of Khomeini's Islamist movement by both the Shah's advisors—who considered them a minor threat compared to the Marxists and Islamic socialists—and by the secularist opponents of the government—who thought the Khomeinists could be sidelined.

=== Tobacco Protest (1891) ===
At the end of the 19th century, the Shi'a clergy (ulama) had a significant influence on Iranian society. The clergy first showed itself to be a powerful political force in opposition to the monarchy with the 1891 Tobacco protest. On 20 March 1890, the long-standing Iranian monarch Nasir al-Din Shah granted a concession to British Major G. F. Talbot for a full monopoly over the production, sale, and export of tobacco for 50 years. At the time, the Persian tobacco industry employed over 200,000 people, so the concession represented a major blow to Persian farmers and bazaaris whose livelihoods were largely dependent on the lucrative tobacco business. The boycotts and protests against it were widespread and extensive as result of Mirza Hasan Shirazi's fatwa (judicial decree). Within two years, Nasir al-Din Shah found himself powerless to stop the popular movement and cancelled the concession.

The Tobacco Protest was the first significant Iranian resistance against Shah and foreign interests, revealing the power of the people and the ulama influence among them.

=== Persian Constitutional Revolution (1905–1911) ===
The growing dissatisfaction continued until the Constitutional Revolution of 1905–1911. The revolution led to the establishment of a parliament, the National Consultative Assembly (also known as the Majlis), and approval of the first constitution. Although the constitutional revolution was successful in weakening the autocracy of the Qajar regime, it failed to provide a powerful alternative government. Therefore, in the decades following the establishment of the new parliament, a number of critical events took place. Many of these events can be viewed as a continuation of the struggle between the constitutionalists and the Shahs of Persia, many of whom were backed by foreign powers against the parliament.

=== Reza Shah (1921–1941) ===
Insecurity and chaos that were created after the Constitutional Revolution led to the rise of General Reza Khan, the commander of the elite Persian Cossack Brigade who seized power in a coup d'état in February 1921. He established a constitutional monarchy, deposing the last Qajar Shah, Ahmad Shah, in 1925 and being designated monarch by the National Assembly, to be known thenceforth as Reza Shah, founder of the Pahlavi dynasty.

There were widespread social, economic, and political reforms introduced during his reign, a number of which led to public discontent that would provide the circumstances for the Iranian Revolution. Particularly controversial was the replacement of Islamic laws with secular Western ones and the forbidding of traditional Islamic clothing, separation of the sexes, and veiling of women's faces with the niqab. Police forcibly removed and tore the chadors off women who resisted his ban on the public hijab.

In 1935, dozens were killed and hundreds injured in the Goharshad Mosque rebellion. During the early rise of Reza Shah, Abdul-Karim Ha'eri Yazdi founded the Qom Seminary and created important changes in seminaries. However, he would avoid entering into political issues, as did other religious leaders who followed him. Hence, no widespread anti-government attempts were organized by the clergy during the rule of Reza Shah. The future Ayatollah Khomeini was a student of Sheikh Abdul Karim Ha'eri.

=== Anglo-Soviet invasion and Mohammad Reza Shah (1941–1951) ===
In 1941, an invasion by allied British and Soviet troops deposed Reza Shah, who was considered friendly to Nazi Germany. They installed his son, Mohammad Reza Pahlavi as Shah. Iran remained under Soviet occupation until the Red Army withdrew in June 1946.

The post-war years were characterized by political instability, as the Shah clashed with the pro-Soviet Prime Minister Ahmad Qavam, the communist Tudeh Party grew in size and influence and the Iranian Army had to deal with Soviet-sponsored separatist movements in Iranian Azerbaijan and Iranian Kurdistan.

=== Mosaddegh and The Anglo-Iranian Oil Company (1951–1952) ===
From 1901 on, the British Owned Anglo-Persian Oil Company (renamed the Anglo-Iranian Oil Company in 1935), enjoyed a monopoly on the sale and production of Iranian oil. It was the most profitable British business in the world. Most Iranians lived in poverty while the wealth generated from Iranian oil played a decisive role in maintaining Britain as a preeminent global power. In 1951, Iranian Prime Minister Mohammad Mosaddegh pledged to throw the company out of Iran, reclaim the petroleum reserves and free Iran from foreign powers.

In 1952, Mosaddegh nationalized the Anglo-Iranian Oil Company and became a national hero. The British, however, were outraged and accused him of theft. The British unsuccessfully sought adjudication from the International Court of Justice and the United Nations, sent warships to the Persian Gulf, and finally imposed a crushing embargo. Mosaddegh was unmoved by Britain's campaign against him. One European newspaper, the Frankfurter Neue Presse, reported that Mosaddegh "would rather be fried in Persian oil than make the slightest concession to the British." The British considered an armed invasion, but U.K. Prime Minister Winston Churchill decided on a coup after being refused American military support by US President Harry S. Truman, who sympathized with nationalist movements like Mosaddegh's and had nothing but contempt for old-style imperialists like those who ran the Anglo-Iranian Oil Company. Mosaddegh, however, learned of Churchill's plans and ordered the British embassy to be closed in October 1952, forcing all British diplomats and agents to leave the country.

Although the British were initially turned down in their request for American support by President Truman, the election of Dwight D. Eisenhower as US president in November 1952 changed the American stance toward the conflict. This, paired with Cold War paranoia and fears of communist influence, contributed to American strategic actions. On 20 January 1953, US Secretary of State John Foster Dulles and his brother, C.I.A. Director Allen Dulles, told their British counterparts that they were ready to move against Mosaddegh. In their eyes, any country not decisively allied with the United States was a potential enemy. Iran had immense oil wealth, a long border with the Soviet Union, and a nationalist prime minister. The prospect of a fall into communism and a "second China" (after Mao Zedong won the Chinese Civil War) terrified the Dulles brothers. Operation Ajax was born, in which the only democratic government Iran ever had was deposed.

=== Iranian coup d'état and US influence ===
On 15 August 1953 a coup d'état was initiated to remove Mosaddegh, with the support of the United States, the United Kingdom and most of the Shia clergy. The Shah fled to Italy when the initial coup attempt on August 15 failed, but returned after a successful second attempt on August 19. Mosaddegh was removed from power and put under house arrest, while lieutenant general Fazlollah Zahedi was appointed as new Prime Minister by the Shah. The sovereign, who was mainly seen as a figurehead at the time, eventually managed to break free from the shackles of the Iranian elites and impose himself as an autocratic reformist ruler.

The coup reinstated Mohammad Reza Pahlavi as an absolute monarch and significantly increased United States influence over Iran. Economically, American firms gained considerable control over Iranian oil production, with US companies taking around 40 percent of the profits. Politically, Iran acted as a counterweight to the Soviet Union and aligned closely with the Western Bloc. Additionally, the US provided the Shah both the funds and the training for SAVAK, Iran's infamous secret police, with CIA assistance.

SAVAK's repression unfolded with little scrutiny or challenge from the US. By the late 1970s, popular resistance to the Shah's rule had reached a breaking point.

=== White Revolution (1963–1979) ===
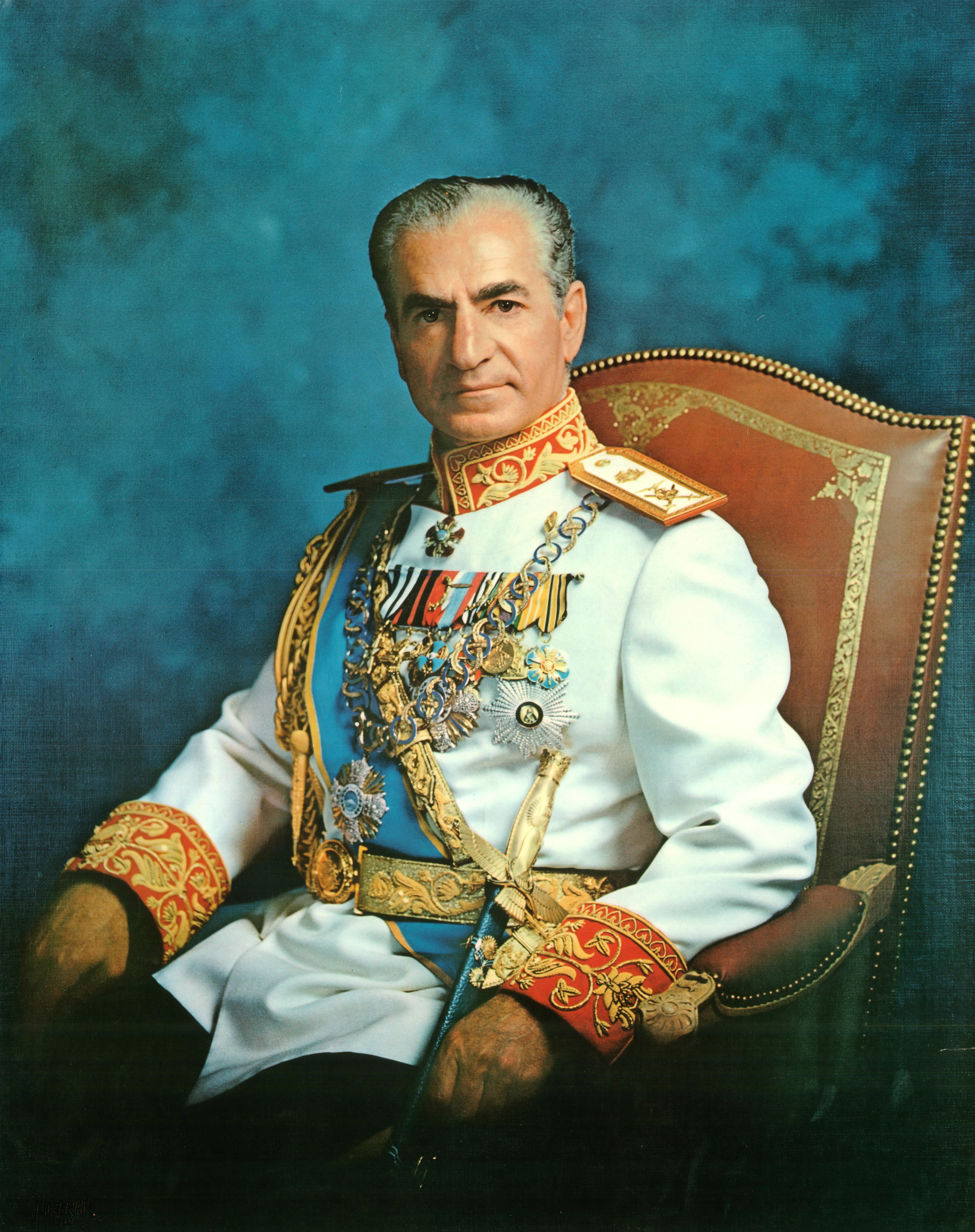
Shah Mohammad Reza Pahlavi

The White Revolution was a far-reaching series of reforms in Iran launched in 1963 by Shah Mohammad Reza Pahlavi and lasting until 1979. Mohammad Reza Shah's reform program was built especially to weaken those classes that supported the traditional system. It consisted of several elements including land reform; sales of some state-owned factories to finance the land reform; the enfranchisement of women; nationalization of forests and pastures; formation of a literacy corps; and the institution of profit-sharing schemes for workers in industry.

The Shah pushed the White Revolution as a step toward westernization, and it was a way for him to legitimize the Pahlavi dynasty. Part of the reason for launching the White Revolution was that the Shah hoped to eliminate the influence of landlords and to create a new base of support among the peasants and the working class. Thus, the White Revolution in Iran was an attempt to introduce reform from above and preserve traditional power patterns. Through land reform, the essence of the White Revolution, the Shah hoped to ally himself with the peasantry in the countryside, and hoped to sever their ties with the aristocracy in the city.

The Shah did not foresee the White Revolution leading to new social tensions that created many of the problems he was trying to avoid. The Shah's reforms more than quadrupled the combined size of the two classes that posed the greatest challenges to his monarchy in the past — the intelligentsia, and the urban working class. Their resentment of the Shah also grew, as they were now stripped of organizations that had represented them in the past, such as political parties, professional associations, trade unions, and independent newspapers. Land reform, instead of allying the peasants with the government, produced large numbers of independent farmers and landless laborers who became part of the political opposition, with no loyalty to the Shah. Many of the masses resented the increasingly corrupt government; their loyalty to the clergy, who were viewed as more concerned with the fate of the populace, remained consistent or increased. As Ervand Abrahamian pointed out: "The White Revolution had been designed to preempt a Red Revolution. Instead, it paved the way for an Islamic Revolution." In theory, oil money funneled to the elite was supposed to create jobs and factories, eventually distributing the money. Instead the wealth tended to remain concentrated in the hands of the very few at the top.

=== Rise and exile of Ayatollah Khomeini (1963–1979) ===
The post-revolutionary leader, Twelver Shia cleric Ayatollah Ruhollah Khomeini, first rose to political prominence in 1963 when he led opposition to the Shah and his White Revolution. Khomeini was arrested in 1963 after declaring the Shah a "wretched, miserable man" who "embarked on the [path toward] destruction of Islam in Iran." Three days of major riots throughout Iran followed, with 15,000 dead from police fire as reported by opposition sources. However, anti-revolutionary sources conjectured that just 32 were killed.

Khomeini was released after eight months of house arrest and continued his agitation, condemning Iran's close cooperation with Israel and its capitulations, or extension of diplomatic immunity, to American government personnel in Iran. In November 1964, Khomeini was re-arrested and sent into exile where he remained for 15 years (mostly in Najaf, Iraq), until the revolution.

==== Ideology of the Iranian Revolution ====
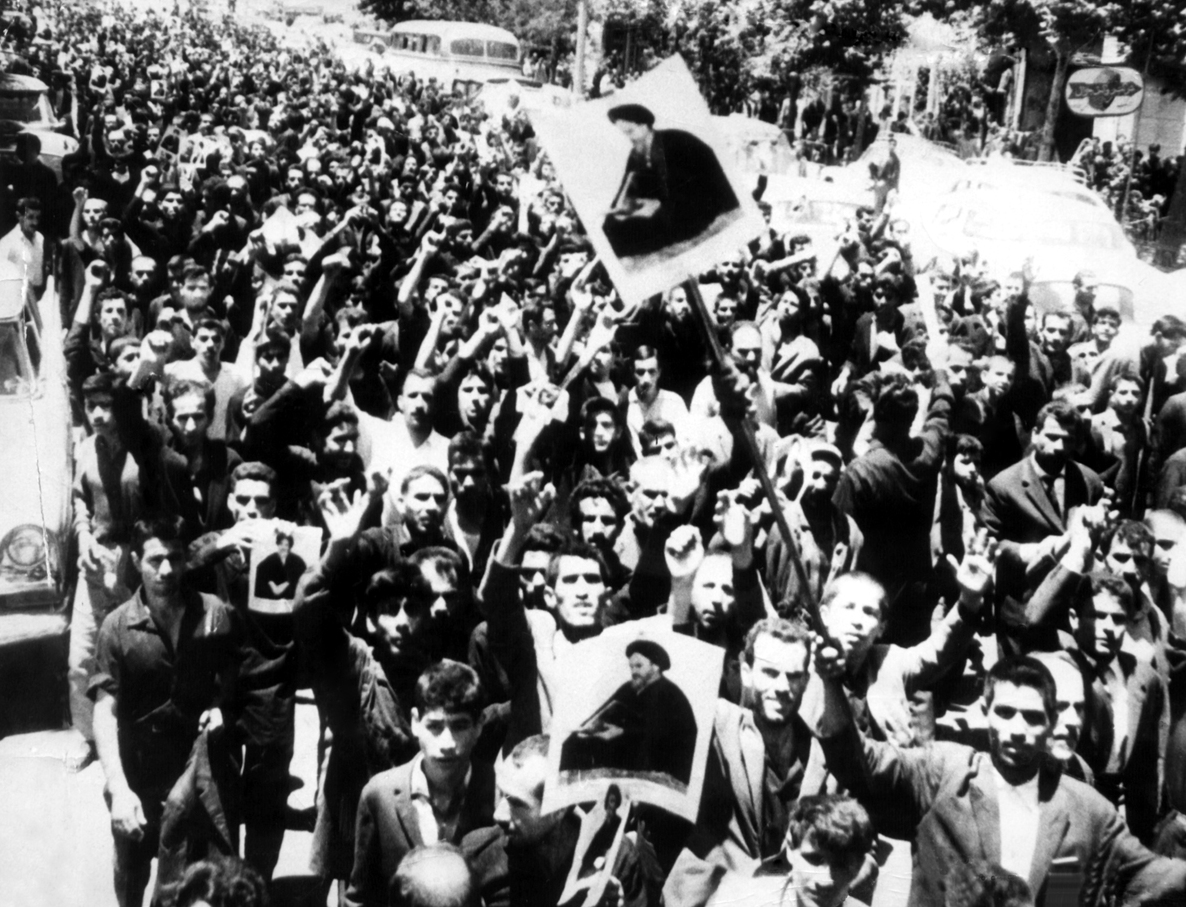
Residents of Tehran participating in the demonstrations of 5 June 1963 with pictures of Ruhollah Khomeini in their hands

In this interim period of "disaffected calm," the budding Iranian revival began to undermine the idea of Westernization as progress that was the basis of the Shah's secular reign, and to form the ideology of the 1979 revolution: Jalal Al-e-Ahmad's idea of Gharbzadegi—that Western culture was a plague or an intoxication to be eliminated; Ali Shariati's vision of Islam as the one true liberator of the Third World from oppressive colonialism, neo-colonialism, and capitalism; and Morteza Motahhari's popularized retellings of the Shia faith all spread and gained listeners, readers and supporters.

Most importantly, Khomeini preached that revolt, and especially martyrdom against injustice and tyranny was part of Shia Islam, and that Muslims should reject the influence of both liberal capitalism and communism, ideas that inspired the revolutionary slogan "Neither East, nor West – Islamic Republic!"

Away from public view, Khomeini developed the ideology of velayat-e faqih (guardianship of the jurist) as government, that Muslims—in fact everyone—required "guardianship," in the form of rule or supervision by the leading Islamic jurist or jurists. Such rule was ultimately "more necessary even than prayer and fasting" in Islam, (Note: See: Velayat-e faqih (book by Khomeini)#Importance of Islamic Government) as it would protect Islam from deviation from traditional sharia law and in so doing eliminate poverty, injustice, and the "plundering" of Muslim land by foreign non-believers.

This idea of rule by Islamic jurists was spread through his book Islamic Government, mosque sermons, and smuggled cassette speeches by Khomeini among his opposition network of students (talabeh), ex-students (able clerics such as Morteza Motahhari, Mohammad Beheshti, Mohammad-Javad Bahonar, Akbar Hashemi Rafsanjani, and Mohammad Mofatteh), and traditional businessmen (bazaari) inside Iran.

==== Opposition groups and organizations ====
Other opposition groups included constitutionalist liberals—the democratic, reformist Islamic Freedom Movement of Iran, headed by Mehdi Bazargan, and the more secular National Front. They were based in the urban middle class, and wanted the Shah to adhere to the Iranian Constitution of 1906 rather than to replace him with a theocracy, but lacked the cohesion and organization of Khomeini's forces.

Communist groups—primarily the Tudeh Party of Iran and the Fedaian guerrillas (Note: Marxist guerrillas groups were the Organization of Iranian People's Fedai Guerrillas (OIPFG) and the breakaway Iranian People's Fedai Guerrillas (IPFG), and some minor groups.)—had been weakened considerably by government repression. Despite this the guerrillas did help play an important part in the final February 1979 overthrow delivering "the regime its coup de grace." The most powerful guerrilla group—the People's Mujahedin—was leftist Islamist and opposed the influence of the clergy as reactionary.

Some important clergy did not follow Khomeini's lead. Popular ayatollah Mahmoud Taleghani supported the left, while perhaps the most senior and influential ayatollah in Iran—Mohammad Kazem Shariatmadari—first remained aloof from politics and then came out in support of a democratic revolution.

Khomeini worked to unite this opposition behind him (except for the unwanted 'atheistic Marxists'), focusing on the socio-economic problems of the Shah's government (corruption and unequal income and development), while avoiding specifics among the public that might divide the factions—particularly his plan for clerical rule, which he believed most Iranians had become prejudiced against as a result of propaganda campaign by Western imperialists. (Note: See: Hokumat-e Islami : Velayat-e faqih (book by Khomeini)#Why has Islamic Government not been established?)

In the post-Shah era, some revolutionaries who clashed with his theocracy and were suppressed by his movement complained of deception, but in the meantime anti-Shah unity was maintained.

=== 1970–1977 ===
Several events in the 1970s set the stage for the 1979 revolution.

The 1971 2,500-year celebration of the Persian Empire at Persepolis, organized by the government, was attacked for its extravagance. "As the foreigners reveled on drink forbidden by Islam, Iranians were not only excluded from the festivities, some were starving." Five years later, the Shah angered pious Iranian Muslims by changing the first year of the Iranian solar calendar from the Islamic hijri to the ascension to the throne by Cyrus the Great. "Iran jumped overnight from the Muslim year 1355 to the royalist year 2535."

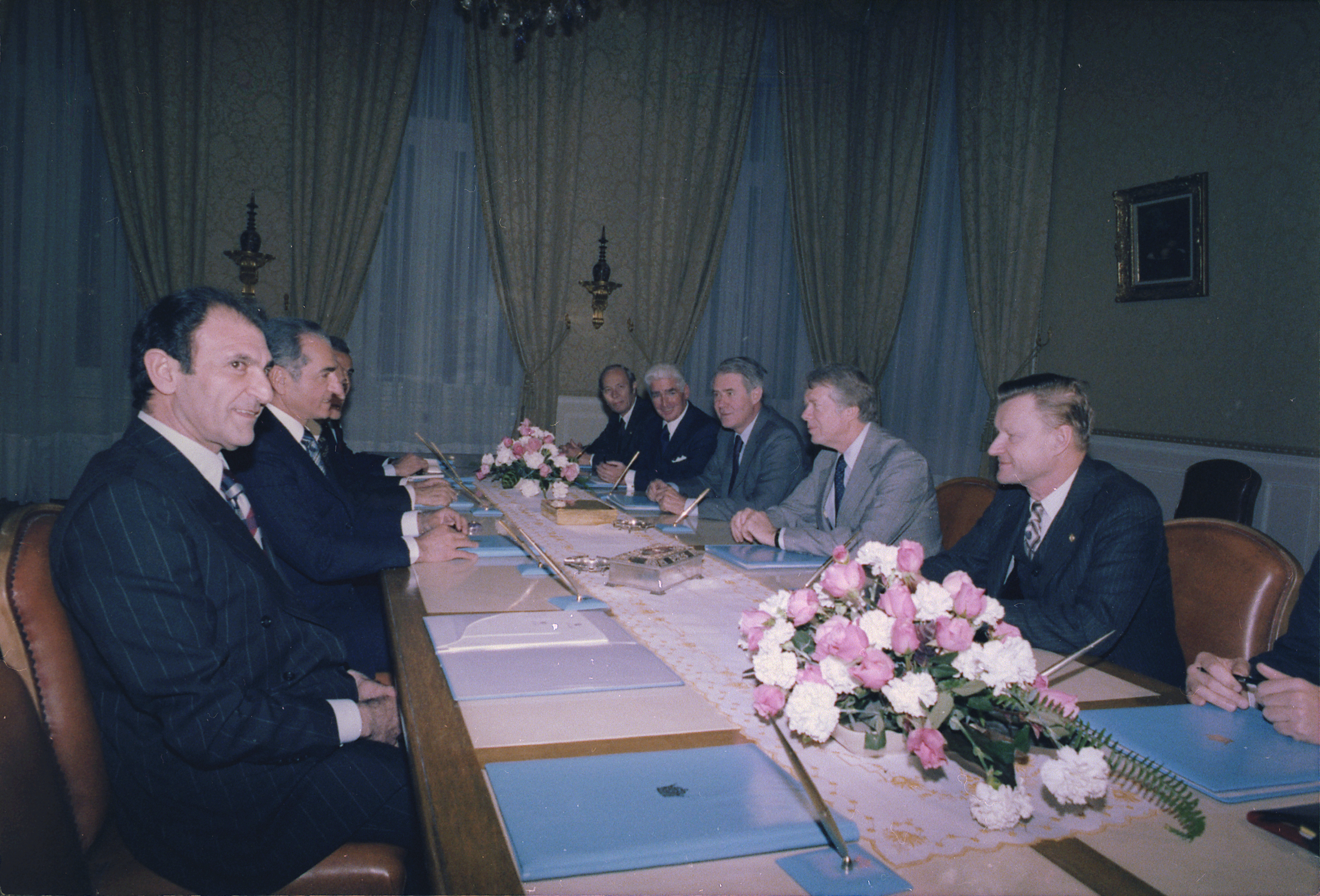
The Shah of Iran (left) meeting with members of the US government: Alfred Atherton, William Sullivan, Cyrus Vance, Jimmy Carter, and Zbigniew Brzezinski, 1977

The oil boom of the 1970s produced an "alarming" increase in inflation, waste and an "accelerating gap" between the rich and poor, the urban and the rural, along with the presence of tens of thousands of unpopular skilled foreign workers. Many Iranians were also angered by the fact that the Shah's family was the foremost beneficiary of the income generated by oil, and the line between state earnings and family earnings blurred. By 1976, the Shah had accumulated upward of $1 billion from oil revenue; his family – including 63 princes and princesses had accumulated between $5 and $20 billion; and the family foundation controlled approximately $3 billion. By mid-1977 economic austerity measures to fight inflation disproportionately affected thousands of poor and unskilled male migrants settled in the cities and working in the construction industry. Culturally and religiously conservative, many went on to form the core of the revolution's demonstrators and "martyrs".

All Iranians were required to join and pay dues to a new political party, the Rastakhiz Party —all other parties were banned. That party's attempt to fight inflation with populist "anti-profiteering" campaigns—fining and jailing merchants for high prices – angered and politicized merchants while fueling black markets.

In 1977 the Shah responded to the "polite reminder" of the importance of political rights by the new American president, Jimmy Carter, by granting amnesty to some prisoners and allowing the Red Cross to visit prisons. Through 1977 liberal opposition formed organizations and issued open letters denouncing the government. Against this background a first crucial manifestation of public expression of social discontent and political protest against the regime took place in October 1977, when the German-Iranian Cultural Association in Tehran hosted a series of literature reading sessions, organized by the newly revived Iranian Writers Association and the German Goethe-Institute. In these "Ten Nights" (Dah Shab) 57 of Iran's most prominent poets and writers read their works to thousands of listeners. They demanded the end of censorship and claimed the freedom of expression.

Also in 1977, the popular and influential modernist Islamist theorist Ali Shariati died under mysterious circumstances. This both angered his followers, who considered him a martyr at the hands of SAVAK, and removed a potential revolutionary rival to Khomeini. Finally, in October, Khomeini's son Mostafa died of an alleged heart attack, and his death was also blamed on SAVAK. A subsequent memorial service for Mostafa in Tehran put Khomeini back in the spotlight.

==== Outbreak ====
By 1977, the Shah's policy of political liberalization was underway. Secular opponents of the Shah began to meet in secret to denounce the government. Led by the leftist intellectual Saeed Soltanpour, the Iranian Writers Association met at the Goethe Institute in Tehran to read anti-government poetry. Ali Shariati's death in the United Kingdom shortly after led to another public demonstration, with the opposition accusing the Shah of murdering him.

The chain of events initiating the revolution began with the death of Mostafa Khomeini, chief aide and eldest son of Ruhollah Khomeini. He mysteriously died at midnight on 23 October 1977 in Najaf, Iraq. SAVAK and the Iraqi government declared heart attack as the cause of death, though many attributed his death to SAVAK. Khomeini remained silent after the incident, while in Iran with the spread of the news came a wave of protest and mourning ceremonies in several cities. The mourning of Mostafa was given a political cast by Khomeini's political credentials, their enduring opposition to the monarchy and their exile. This dimension of the ceremonies went beyond the religious credentials of the family.

== Prelude (1978) ==
=== Beginning of protests (January) ===
On 7 January 1978, an article titled "Iran and Red and Black Colonization" appeared in the national daily Ettela'at newspaper. Written under a pseudonym by a government agent, it denounced Khomeini as a "British agent" and a "mad Indian poet" conspiring to sell out Iran to neo-colonialists and communists.

The developments initiated by seminaries in the city of Qom closing on 7 January 1978 were followed by the bazaar and seminary closing, and students rallied towards the homes of the religious leaders the next day. On 9 January 1978, seminary students and other people demonstrated in the city, and the Shah's security forces cracked down on the demonstrators. The security forces shot live ammunition to disperse the crowd when the peaceful demonstration turned violent. Reports of between 5 and 300 demonstrators were killed in the assault on the protesters. 9 January 1978 (19 Dey) is regarded as a bloody day in Qom.

=== Consolidation of the opposition (February–March) ===
According to Shia custom, memorial services (chehelom) are held 40 days after a person's death. Encouraged by Khomeini (who declared that the blood of martyrs must water the "tree of Islam"), radicals pressured the mosques and moderate clergy to commemorate the deaths of the students, and used the occasion to generate protests. The informal network of mosques and bazaars, which for years had been used to carry out religious events, increasingly became consolidated as a coordinated protest organization.

On 18 February, 40 days after the Qom protests, demonstrations broke out in various cities. The largest was in Tabriz, which descended into a full-scale riot. "Western" and government symbols such as cinemas, bars, state-owned banks, and police stations were set ablaze. Units of the Imperial Iranian Army were deployed to restore order. The death toll, according to the government was six, while Khomeini claimed hundreds were "martyred".

Forty days later, on 29 March, demonstrations were organized in at least 55 cities, including Tehran. In an increasingly predictable pattern, deadly riots broke out in major cities, and again 40 days later, on 10 May. Army commandos opened fire on Shariatmadari's house, killing one of his students. Shariatmadari immediately made a public announcement declaring his support for a "constitutional government" and a return to the policies of the 1906 Constitution.

=== Government reaction ===
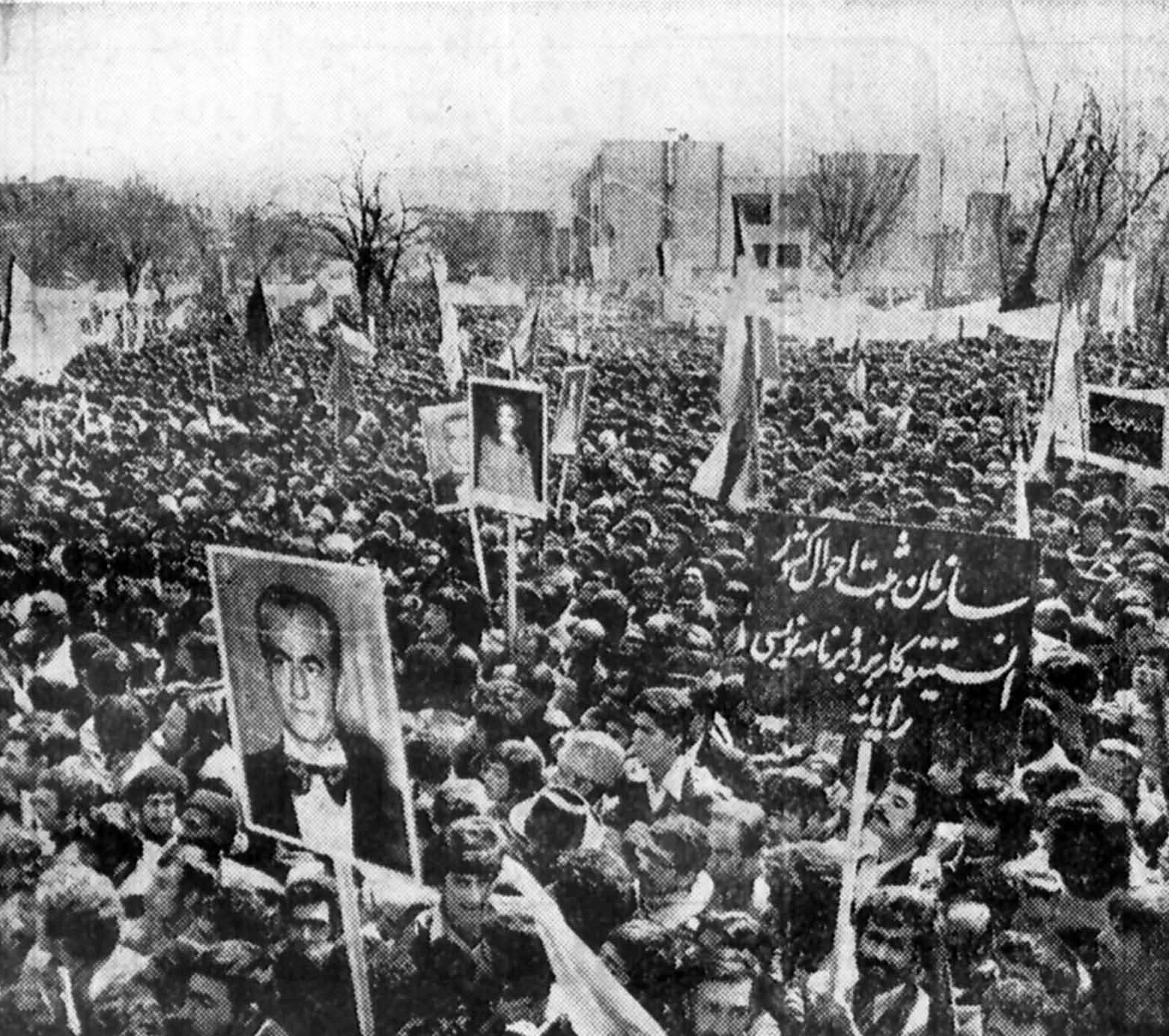
Pro-Shah demonstration organized by the Resurgence Party in Tabriz, April 1978

The Shah was taken completely by surprise by the protests and often became indecisive during times of crisis. Virtually every major decision he made backfired and further inflamed the revolutionaries.

The Shah decided to continue on his plan of liberalization and to negotiate rather than to use force against the still-nascent protest movement. He promised fully democratic elections for the Majlis would be held in 1979, relaxed censorship, and a resolution was drafted to help reduce corruption within the royal family and the government. Protesters were tried in civilian courts rather than by military courts-martial and were quickly released.

Iran's security forces had neither received riot-control training nor equipment since 1963. As a result, police were unable to control demonstrations, thus the army was frequently deployed. Soldiers were instructed not to use deadly force, yet there were instances of inexperienced soldiers reacting excessively, inflaming the violence without cowing the opposition, and receiving official condemnation from the Shah. The Carter administration in the US also refused to sell non-lethal tear gas and rubber bullets to Iran.

As early as the February riots in Tabriz, the Shah fired all SAVAK officials in the city as a concession to the opposition, and soon began to dismiss civil servants and government officials whom he felt the public blamed. In the first national concession, he replaced the hardline SAVAK chief General Nematollah Nassiri with the more moderate General Nasser Moghaddam. The government also negotiated with moderate religious leaders such as Shariatmadari, apologizing to him for the raid on his house.

==== Early summer (June) ====
By summer, the protests remained at a steady rate for four months, with about 10,000 participants in each major city—with the exception of Isfahan, where protests were larger, and Tehran, where they were smaller—protesting every 40 days. This amounted to a small minority of the more than 15 million adults in Iran.

Against the wishes of Khomeini, Shariatmadari called for 17 June mourning protests to be carried out as a one-day stay. Although tension remained, the Shah's policy appeared to have worked, leading Amuzegar to declare that "the crisis is over." A CIA analysis in August concluded that Iran "is not in a revolutionary or even a pre-revolutionary situation." These and later events in Iran are frequently cited as one of the most consequential strategic surprises that the United States has experienced since the CIA was established in 1947.

As a sign of easing of government restrictions, three prominent opposition leaders from the secular National Front—Karim Sanjabi, Shapour Bakhtiar, and Dariush Forouhar—were allowed to pen an open letter to the Shah demanding that he reign according to the constitution of Iran.

=== Renewed protests (August–September) ===
==== Appointment of Jafar Sharif-Emami as prime minister (11 August) ====
By August, the protests had "kick[ed]...into high gear," and the number of demonstrators mushroomed to hundreds of thousands. In an attempt to dampen inflation, the Amuzegar administration cut spending and reduced business. However, the cutbacks led to a sharp rise in layoffs—particularly among young, unskilled, male workers living in the working-class districts. By summer 1978, the working class joined the street protests in massive numbers. In addition, it was the Islamic holy month of Ramadan, bringing a sense of increased religiosity.

A series of escalating protests broke out in major cities, and deadly riots broke out in Isfahan where protesters fought for the release of Ayatollah Jalaluddin Taheri. Martial law was declared in the city on 11 August as symbols of Western culture and government buildings were burned, and a bus full of American workers was bombed. Due to his failure to stop the protests, prime minister Amuzegar offered his resignation.

The Shah increasingly felt that he was losing control of the situation and sought to regain it through complete appeasement. He decided to appoint Jafar Sharif-Emami to the post of prime minister, himself a veteran prime minister. Emami was chosen due to his family ties to the clergy, although he had a reputation of corruption during his previous premiership.

Under the Shah's guidance, Sharif-Emami effectively began a policy of "appeasing the opposition's demands before they even made them." The government abolished the Rastakhiz Party, legalized all political parties and released political prisoners, increased freedom of expression, curtailed SAVAK's authority and dismissed 34 of its commanders, closed down casinos and nightclubs, and abolished the imperial calendar. The government also began to prosecute corrupt government and royal family members. Sharif-Emami entered into negotiations with Shariatmadari and National Front leader Karim Sanjabi to help organize future elections. Censorship was effectively terminated, and the newspapers began reporting heavily on demonstrations, often highly critically and negatively of the Shah. The Majlis (parliament) also began issuing resolutions against the government.

==== Cinema Rex fire (19 August) ====
On 19 August, in the southwestern city of Abadan, four arsonists barred the door of the Cinema Rex movie theatre and set it on fire. In what would be the largest terrorist attack in history prior to the September 11 attacks in the US in 2001, 422 people inside the theatre were burned to death. Khomeini immediately blamed the Shah and SAVAK for setting the fire, and, due to the pervasive revolutionary atmosphere, the public also blamed the Shah for starting the fire, despite the government's insistence that they were uninvolved. Tens of thousands of people took to the streets shouting "Burn the Shah!" and "The Shah is the guilty one!"

After the revolution, many claimed that Islamist militants had started the fire. After the Islamic republic government executed a police officer for the act, a man claiming to be the lone surviving arsonist claimed he was responsible for starting the fire. After forcing the resignation of the presiding judges in an attempt to hamper the investigation, the new government finally executed Hossein Talakhzadeh for "setting the fire on the Shah's orders," despite his insistence that he did it on his own accord as an ultimate sacrifice for the revolutionary cause.

==== Declaration of martial law and the Jaleh Square Massacre (8 September) ====
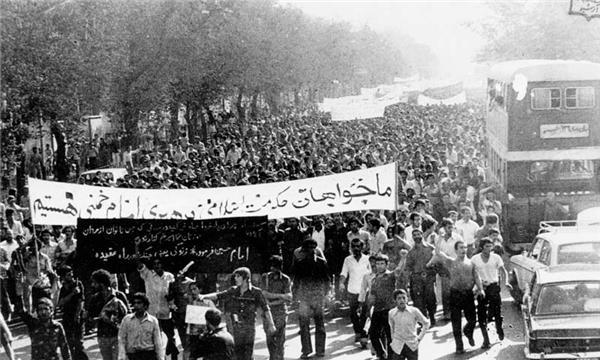
Demonstration of 8 September 1978. The placard reads: We want an Islamic government, led by Imam Khomeini.

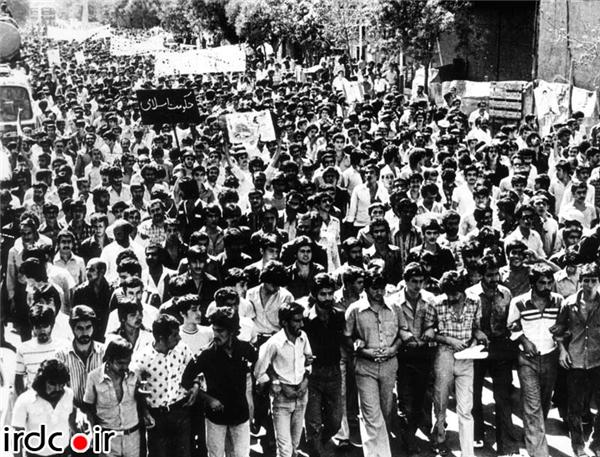
Demonstration of "Black Friday" (8 September 1978)

The 4th of September marked Eid al-Fitr, the holiday celebrating the end of Ramadan. A permit for an open-air prayer was granted, in which 200,000–500,000 people attended. Instead, the clergy directed the crowd on a march through the center of Tehran. The Shah reportedly watched from his helicopter, unnerved and confused. A few days later, even larger protests took place, and, for the first time, protesters called for Khomeini's return and the establishment of an Islamic republic.

At midnight on 8 September, the Shah declared martial law in Tehran and 11 other major cities. All street demonstrations were banned and a curfew was imposed. Tehran's martial law commander, general Gholam-Ali Oveissi, was known for his severity against opponents. However, the Shah made clear that once martial law was lifted, he intended to resume liberalization. He retained Sharif-Emami's civilian government, hoping protesters would avoid taking the streets.

However, 6,000 protesters took to the streets, either in defiance or because they had missed hearing the declaration, and faced off with soldiers at Jaleh Square. After warning shots failed to disperse the crowd, troops fired directly into it, killing 64. General Oveissi claimed that 30 soldiers were killed by snipers in surrounding buildings. Additional clashes throughout the day, which would be called Black Friday by the opposition, brought the opposition death toll to 89.

===== Reactions to Black Friday =====
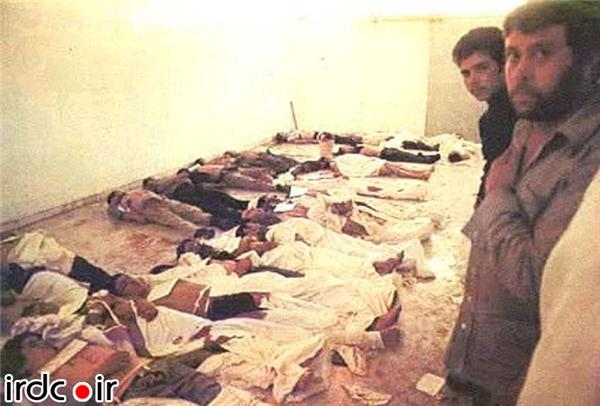
Victims of Black Friday

The deaths shocked the country and damaged any attempt at reconciliation between the Shah and the opposition. Khomeini immediately declared that 4,000 innocent protesters were massacred by "Zionists". Both claims were fabricated- the Israelis had nothing to do with the deaths, and the number killed was 88, not 4000. The claims were believed by many, which gave Khomeini a pretext to reject any further compromise with the government.

The Shah was horrified by Black Friday and harshly criticized the events, though this did little to sway public perception of him as being responsible for the shooting, despite Khomeini blaming the "Zionists". While martial law officially remained in effect, the government decided not to break up any more demonstrations or strikes (in effect, "martial law without there exactly being martial law," according to Sharif-Emami), instead continuing to negotiate with protest leaders. Consequently, protests often took place without any serious intervention by soldiers.

=== Nationwide strikes (September–November) ===
Oil strikes started in the fall of 1978 and led to a 4.8 million barrel drop of crude oil daily production, which was about 7% of the world's supply. Prices rose from 13 dollars per barrel in 1979 to 34 dollars in 1980. While increased production from other countries, like Saudi Arabia, offset the decline in supply slightly there was still a 10% drop in available oil.

There were a variety of factors influencing the workers' decision to strike. The Shah's regime had relaxed oppression in 1977, giving people more access to protest and organizing. At the same time, the economy had faltered after doing better in the early 1970s. The strikes began when the workers at a refinery in Tehran, calling for higher wages and housing allowances, were ignored by the government. The Shah's government responded by killing dozens of strikers in an event known as Black Friday. The following day, strikes emerged in Tehran, Abadan, Isfahan, Shiraz, and Kermanshah. This first wave of strikes was reported by SAVAK to involve 11,000 workers. The oil strikes of 1978 were imperative to the Iranian Revolution's success, as they put extreme economic pressure on the Shah's regime. Oil revenues are a significant part of the government's income and regardless of the motivation behind those who strike, oil strikes often threaten to destabilize Iranian regimes.

By late October, a nationwide general strike was declared, with workers in virtually all major industries walking off their jobs, most damagingly in the oil industry and the print media. Special "strike committees" were set up throughout major industries to organize and coordinate the activities.

The Shah did not attempt to crack down on strikers, instead granting them generous wage increases and allowing strikers who lived in government housing to remain in their homes. By early November, many government officials demanded the Shah use forceful measures to bring the strikers back to work.

=== Khomeini moves to France (November) ===
Seeking to break Khomeini's contacts with the opposition, the Shah pressured the Iraqi government to expel him from Najaf. Khomeini left Iraq, instead moving to a house bought by Iranian exiles in Neauphle-le-Château, a village near Paris, France. The Shah wished that Khomeini would be cut off from the mosques of Najaf and the protest movement. Instead, the plan backfired badly. French telephone and postal connections, superior to those of Iraq, let Khomeini's supporters flood Iran with tapes and recordings of his sermons.

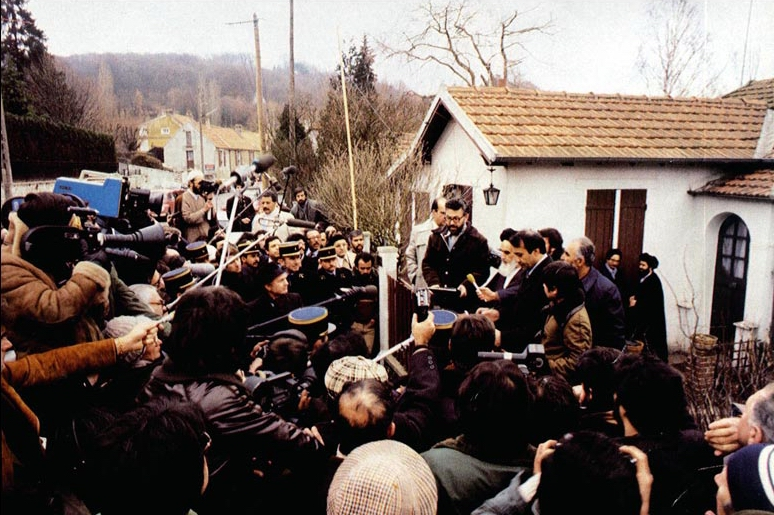
Ayatollah Khomeini in Neauphle-le-Château surrounded by journalists

Worse for the Shah was that the Western media, especially the British Broadcasting Corporation (BBC), immediately put Khomeini into the spotlight. Khomeini rapidly became a household name in the West, portraying himself as an "Eastern mystic" who did not seek power, but instead sought to "free" his people from "oppression." Western media outlets, usually critical of such claims, became one of Khomeini's most powerful tools.

In addition, the media coverage eroded the influence of other, more moderate clergy such as Ayatollah Shariatmadari and Ayatollah Taleghani. The BBC itself later issued a statement admitting to having a "critical" disposition to the Shah, saying that its broadcasts helped to "change the collective perception of the population."

In November, secular National Front leader Karim Sanjabi flew to Paris to meet Khomeini. There the two signed an agreement for a draft constitution that would be "Islamic and democratic". It signaled the now official alliance between the clergy and the secular opposition. To help create a democratic façade, Khomeini placed Westernized figures (such as Sadegh Ghotbzadeh and Ebrahim Yazdi) as the public spokesmen of the opposition, and never spoke to the media of his intentions to create a theocracy.

=== University of Tehran protest (5 November) ===
Street demonstrations continued at full force with little response from the military; by late October, government officials effectively ceded the University of Tehran to student protesters. Worse, the opposition was increasingly armed, firing at soldiers and attacking banks and government buildings in an attempt to destabilize the country.

On 5 November, demonstrations at University of Tehran became deadly after a fight broke out with armed soldiers. Within hours, Tehran broke out into a full-scale riot. Block after block of Western symbols such as movie theaters and department stores, as well as government and police buildings, were seized, looted, and burned. The British embassy in Tehran was partially burned and vandalized; the American embassy nearly suffered the same fate. The event became known to foreign observers as "The Day Tehran Burned."

Many rioters were young teenage boys, often organized by the mosques in southern Tehran and encouraged by their mullahs to attack and destroy western and secular symbols. The army and police, confused about their orders and under pressure from the Shah not to risk initiating violence, effectively gave up and did not intervene.

=== Appointment of a military government (6 November) ===
As the situation on the streets spiraled out of control, many well known and reputable figures within the country began to approach the Shah, begging him to stop the chaos.

On 6 November, the Shah dismissed Sharif-Emami from the post of prime minister, appointing a military government in its place. The Shah chose general Gholam-Reza Azhari to be prime minister because of his mild-mannered approach to the situation. The cabinet he would choose was a military cabinet in name only and consisted primarily of civilian leaders.

The same day, the Shah made a speech on Iranian television. He referred to himself as Padeshah ('master king'), instead of the more grandiose Shahanshah (king of kings), which he insisted on being called previously. In his speech he stated "I have heard the voice of your revolution ... this revolution cannot but be supported by me, the king of Iran". He apologized for mistakes that were committed during his reign, and promised to ensure that corruption would no longer exist. He stated he would begin to work with the opposition to bring democracy, and would form a coalition government. In effect, the Shah intended to restrain the military government (which he described as a temporary caretaker government) from carrying out a full crackdown.

The speech backfired when the revolutionaries sensed weakness from the Shah and "smelled blood." Khomeini announced that there would be no reconciliation with the Shah and called on all Iranians to overthrow him.

Military authorities declared martial law in Khuzestan province (Iran's main oil producing province) and deployed troops to its oil facilities. Navy personnel were also used as strikebreakers in the oil industry. Street marches declined, and oil production began increasing once again, nearly reaching pre-revolutionary levels. In a symbolic blow to the opposition, Karim Sanjabi, who had visited Khomeini in Paris, was arrested upon his return to Iran.

However, the government still continued the policy of appeasement and negotiation. The Shah ordered the arrest of 100 officials from his own government for charges of corruption, including former prime minister Amir Abbas-Hoveyda and former SAVAK head Nematollah Nassiri.

=== Muharram protests (early December) ===
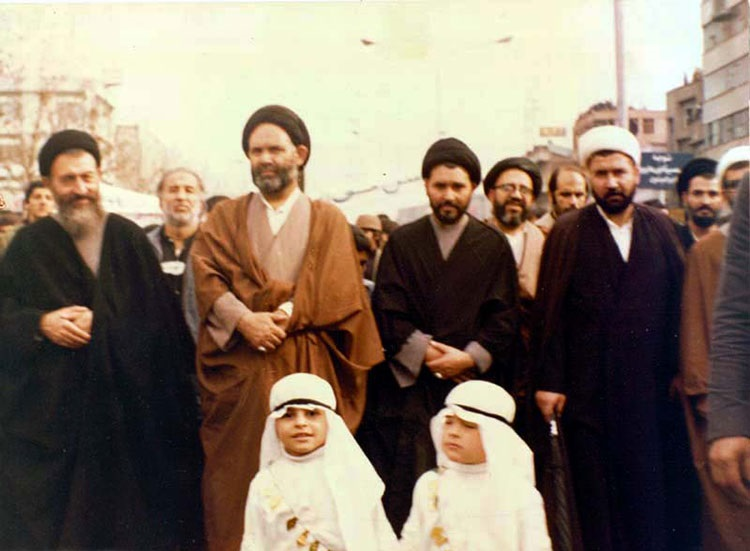
Mohammad Beheshti in the Tehran Ashura demonstration, 11 December 1978

People marching during the Iranian Revolution, 1979

Khomeini condemned the military government and called for continued protests. He and the protest organizers planned a series of escalating protests during the holy Islamic month of Muharram, to culminate with massive protests on the days of Tasu'a and Ashura, the latter commemorating the martyrdom of Imam Husayn ibn Ali, the third Shia Muslim imam.

While the military authorities banned street demonstrations and extended the curfew, the Shah faced deep misgivings about the potential violence.

On 2 December 1978, the Muharram protests began. Named for the Islamic month in which they began, the Muharram protests were huge and pivotal. Over two million protesters (many teenagers proselytized by mullahs from the mosques of southern Tehran) took to the streets, crowding Shahyad Square. Protesters frequently went out at night, violating the curfew, often taking to rooftops and shouting "Allahu-akbar" ('God is great'). According to one witness, many of the clashes on the street had an air of playfulness, with security forces using "kid gloves" against the opposition. Nevertheless, the government reported at least 12 opposition deaths.

The protesters demanded that Shah Mohammad Reza Pahlavi step down from power and that Grand Ayatollah Ruhollah Khomeini be returned from exile. The protests grew incredibly fast, reaching between six million and nine million in strength in the first week. About 5% of the population had taken to the streets in the Muharram protests. Both beginning and ending in the month of Muharram, the protests succeeded, and the Shah stepped down from power later that month.

After the success of what would become known as a revolution, Ayatollah Khomeini returned to Iran as its religious and political leader for life. Khomeini had been an opposition leader to Shah for many years, rising to prominence after the death of his mentor, renowned scholar Yazdi Ha'iri, in the 1930s. Even in his years in exile, Khomeini remained relevant in Iran. Supporting the protests from beyond Iran's borders, he proclaimed that "freedom and liberation from the bonds of imperialism" was imminent.

==== Tasu'a and Ashura marches (10–11 December) ====
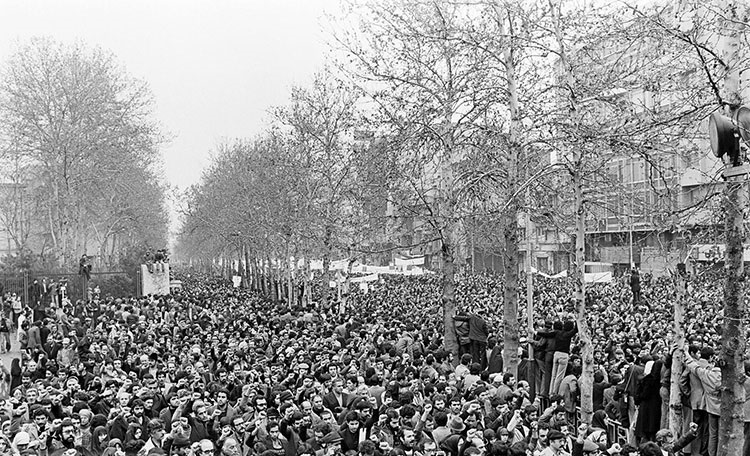

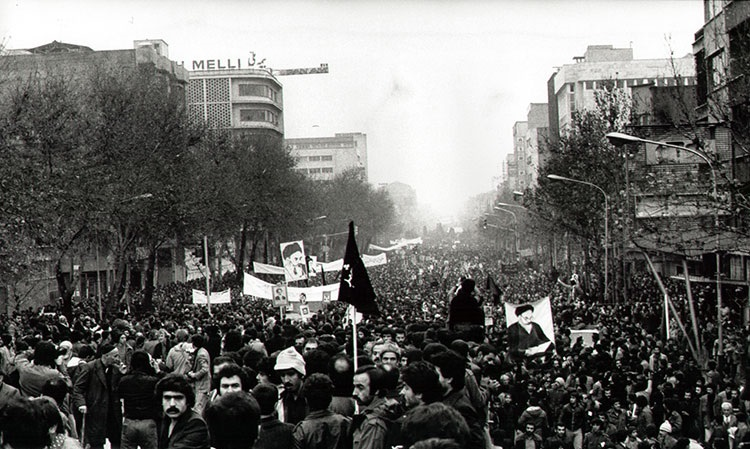
Tehran Ashura demonstration, 11 December 1978

As the days of Tasu'a and Ashura (10 and 11 December) approached, to prevent a deadly showdown, the Shah began to draw back. In negotiations with Ayatollah Shariatmadari, the Shah ordered the release of 120 political prisoners and Karim Sanjabi, and on 8 December revoked the ban on street demonstrations. Permits were issued for the marchers, and troops were removed from the procession's path. In turn, Shariatmadari pledged that to make sure that there would be no violence during the demonstrations.

On 10 and 11 December 1978, the days of Tasu'a and Ashura, between 6 and 9 million anti-Shah demonstrators marched throughout Iran. According to one historian, "even discounting for exaggeration, these figures may represent the largest protest event in history." The marches were led by Ayatollah Taleghani and National Front leader Karim Sanjabi, thus symbolizing the "unity" of the secular and religious opposition. The mullahs and bazaaris effectively policed the gathering, and protesters who attempted to initiate violence were restrained.

More than 10% of the country marched in anti-Shah demonstrations on the two days, possibly a higher percentage than any previous revolution. It is rare for a revolution to involve as much as 1% of a country's population; the French, Russian, and Romanian revolutions may have passed the 1% mark.

== Revolution (late 1978–1979) ==
Much of Iranian society was in euphoria about the coming revolution. Secular and leftist politicians piled onto the movement seeking to gain power in the aftermath, ignoring the fact that Khomeini was the very antithesis to all of the positions they supported. While it was increasingly clear to more secular Iranians that Khomeini was not a liberal, he was widely perceived as a figurehead, and that power would eventually be handed to the secular groups.

=== Demoralization of the army (December, 1978) ===
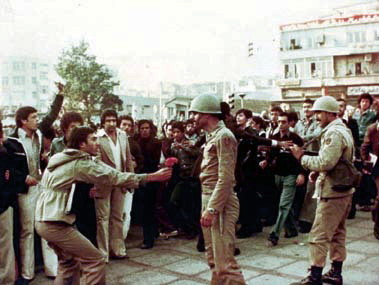
A protester giving flowers to an army officer

The military leadership was increasingly paralyzed by indecision, and rank-and-file soldiers were demoralized, having been forced to confront demonstrators while prohibited from using their own weapons (and being condemned by the Shah if they did). Increasingly, Khomeini called on the soldiers of the armed forces to defect to the opposition. Revolutionaries gave flowers and civilian clothes to deserters, while threatening retribution to those who stayed.

On 11 December, a dozen officers were shot dead by their own troops at Tehran's Lavizan barracks. Fearing further mutinies, many soldiers were returned to their barracks. Mashhad (the second largest city in Iran) was abandoned to the protesters, and in many provincial towns demonstrators were effectively in control.

=== American and internal negotiations with the opposition (late December, 1978) ===
The Carter administration increasingly became locked in a debate about continued support for the monarchy. As early as November, ambassador William Sullivan sent a telegram to Carter (the "Thinking the Unthinkable" telegram). The telegram effectively declared his belief that the Shah would not survive the protests and that the US should consider withdrawing its support for his government and persuading the monarch to abdicate. The United States would then help assemble a coalition of pro-Western military officers, middle class professionals, and moderate clergy, with Khomeini installed as a Gandhi-like spiritual leader.

The telegram touched off a vigorous debate in the American cabinet, with some, such as National Security Advisor Zbigniew Brzezinski, rejecting it outright. Secretary of State Cyrus Vance rejected a military crackdown; he and his supporters believed in the "moderate and progressive" intentions of Khomeini and his circle.

Increasing contact was established with the pro-Khomeini camp. Based on the revolutionaries' responses, some American officials (especially Ambassador Sullivan) felt Khomeini genuinely intended to create a democracy. According to historian Abbas Milani, this led to the United States facilitating Khomeini's rise to power.

The Shah began to search for a new prime minister, one who was a civilian and a member of the opposition. On 28 December, he secured an agreement with another major National Front figure, Shapour Bakhtiar. Bakhtiar would be appointed prime minister (a return to civilian rule), while the Shah and his family would leave the country. His royal duties would be carried out by a Regency Council, and three months after his departure a referendum would be submitted to the people deciding on whether Iran would remain a monarchy or become a republic. A former opponent of the Shah, Bakhtiar became motivated to join the government because he was increasingly aware of Khomeini's intentions to implement hard-line religious rule rather than a democracy. Karim Sanjabi immediately expelled Bakhtiar from the National Front, and Bakhtiar was denounced by Khomeini (who declared that acceptance of his government was the equivalent of "obedience to false gods").

=== The Shah leaves (16 January 1979) ===
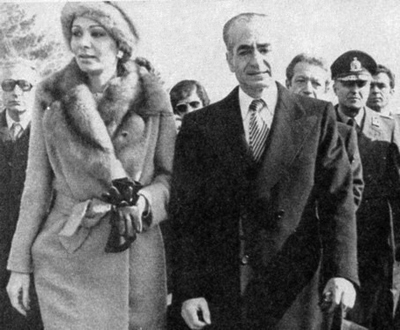
Shah and his wife, Shahbanu Farah, leaving Iran on 16 January 1979

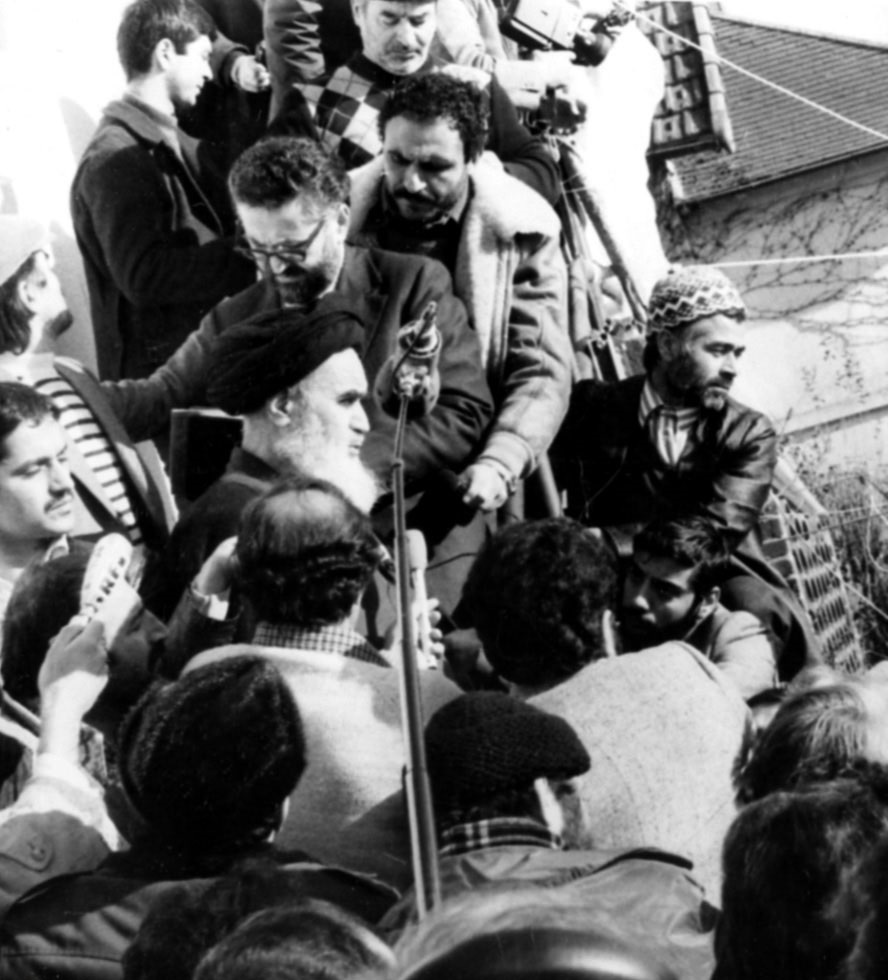
Ayatollah Khomeini giving a speech after arranging a press-conference at Neauphle-le-Château, France, the day after the departure of the Shah

Front cover of Ettela'at, 16 January 1979, featuring the now-famous headline "The Shah Is Gone". The front cover of the same day's edition of Kayhan featured the same headline

The Shah, wanting to see Bakhtiar established, kept delaying his departure. Consequently, to the Iranian public, Bakhtiar was seen as the Shah's last prime minister, undermining his support.

American general Robert Huyser, the deputy commander of US European Command, entered Iran. While the option of a pro-Shah military coup still was a possibility, Huyser met with military leaders (but not the Shah) and established meetings between them and Khomeini allies for the purpose of agreeing on Bakhtiar's transitional government. Ambassador Sullivan disagreed, and attempted to pressure Huyser to ignore the military and work directly with Khomeini's opposition. Nevertheless, Huyser won out and continued to work with both the military and opposition. He left Iran on 3 February. The Shah was privately embittered by Huyser's mission and felt that the United States no longer wanted him in power.

On the morning of 16 January 1979, Bakhtiar was officially appointed prime minister. The same day, a tearful Shah and his family left Iran for exile in Egypt, never to return.

=== Bakhtiar's premiership and Ayatollah Khomeini's return (January–February, 1979) ===
You will see we are not in any particular animosity with the Americans.

Ayatollah Khomeini in a secret message to the Carter administration, January 27th, 1979

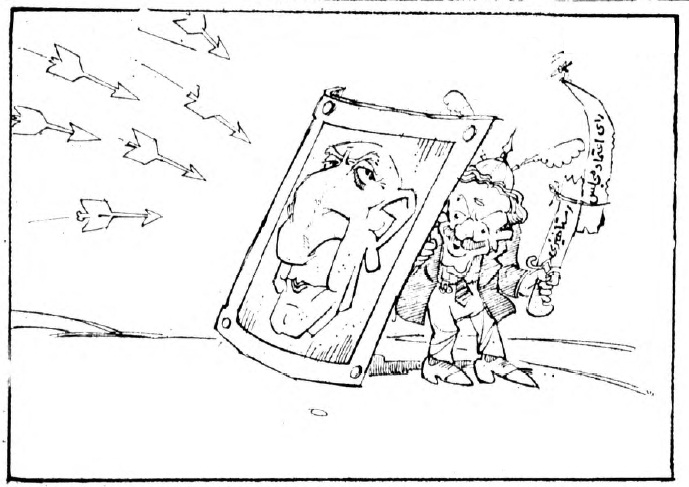
Cartoon depicting Shapour Bakhtiar and Mosaddegh on 22 January 1978 issue of Ettela'at, during the revolution

When the news of the Shah's departure was announced from newspapers and news at 2 pm on Iran's National Radio, there were spontaneous scenes of joy throughout the country. Millions poured onto the streets, and virtually every remaining sign of the monarchy was torn down by the crowds. Bakhtiar dissolved SAVAK and freed all remaining political prisoners. He ordered the army to allow mass demonstrations, promised free elections and invited the revolutionaries into a government of "national unity".

Video of people welcoming Ayatollah Khomeini in the streets of Tehran after his return from exile

Bakhtiar invited Khomeini back to Iran, with the intention of creating a Vatican-like state in the holy city of Qom, declaring that "We will soon have the honor of welcoming home the Ayatollah Khomeini". On 1 February 1979 Khomeini returned to Tehran in a chartered Air France Boeing 747. The welcoming crowd of several million Iranians was so large he was forced to take a helicopter after the car taking him from the airport was overwhelmed by enthusiastic supporters.

Khomeini was now not only the undisputed leader of the revolution, he had become someone seen as a divinely-appointed figure, greeted as he descended from his airplane with cries of 'Khomeini, O Imam, we salute you, peace be upon you.' Crowds were now known to chant "Islam, Islam, Khomeini, We Will Follow You", and even "Khomeini for King."

When asked by a reporter how he felt returning to his home country after a long exile, Khomeini replied "Nothing". On the day of his arrival Khomeini made clear his rejection of Bakhtiar's government in a speech promising, "I shall kick their teeth in. I appoint the government, I appoint the government in support of this nation". On 5 February at his headquarters in the Refah School in southern Tehran, he declared a provisional revolutionary government, appointed opposition leader Mehdi Bazargan (from the religious-nationalist Freedom Movement, affiliated with the National Front) as his own prime minister, and commanded Iranians to obey Bazargan as a religious duty:

[T]hrough the guardianship [Velayat] that I have from the holy lawgiver [God], I hereby pronounce Bazargan as the Ruler, and since I have appointed him, he must be obeyed. The nation must obey him. This is not an ordinary government. It is a government based on the sharia. Opposing this government means opposing the sharia of Islam ... Revolt against God's government is a revolt against God. Revolt against God is blasphemy.

Angered, Bakhtiar made a speech of his own. Reaffirming himself as the legitimate leader, he declared that:

Iran has one government. More than this is intolerable, either for me or for you or for any other Iranian. As a Muslim, I had not heard that jihad refers to one Muslim against other Muslims.... I will not give permission to Ayatollah Khomeini to form an interim government. In life there comes a time when one must stand firm and say no.... I have never seen a book about an Islamic republic; neither has anyone else for that matter.... Some of the people surrounding the Ayatollah are like violent vultures.... The clergy should go to Qom and build a wall around themselves and create their own Vatican.

=== Armed battles and collapse of the monarchy (February, 1979) ===
Tensions between the two rival governments increased rapidly. To demonstrate his support, Khomeini called for demonstrators to occupy the streets throughout the country. He also sent a letter to American officials warning them to withdraw support for Bakhtiar. Bakhtiar became increasingly isolated, with members of the government (including the entire Regency Council) defecting to Khomeini. The military was crumbling, its leadership completely paralyzed, unsure of whether to support Bakhtiar or act on their own, with rank-and-file soldiers either demoralized or deserting.

On 9 February, a rebellion of pro-Khomeini air force technicians broke out at the Doshan Tappeh Air Base. A unit of the pro-Shah Immortal Guards attempted to apprehend the rebels, and an armed battle broke out. Soon large crowds took to the streets, building barricades and supporting the rebels, while Islamic-Marxist guerillas with their weapons joined in support.

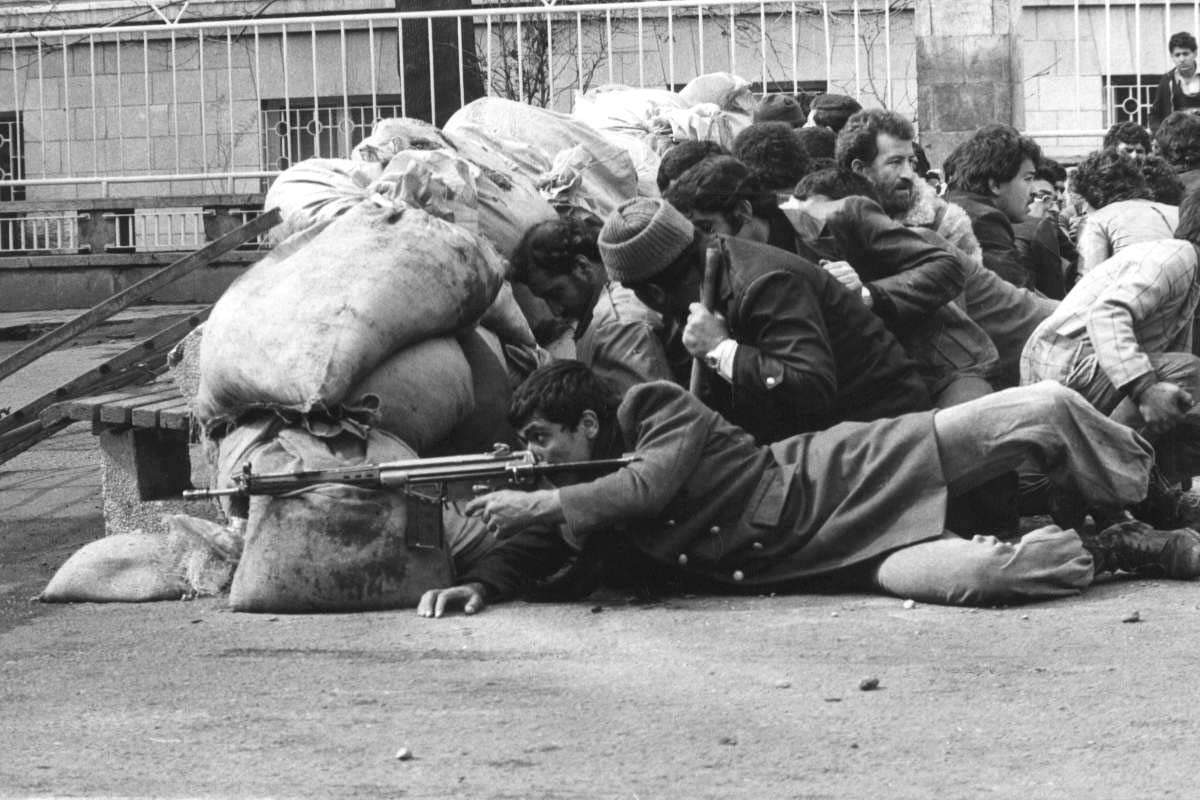
Iranian armed rebels during the revolution

The armed rebels attacked a weapons factory, capturing nearly 50,000 machine guns and distributing them to civilians who joined in the fighting. The rebels stormed police stations and military bases throughout Tehran. The city's martial law commander, general Mehdi Rahimi, decided not to use his 30,000 loyal Immortal Guards to crush the rebellion for fear of producing civilian casualties.

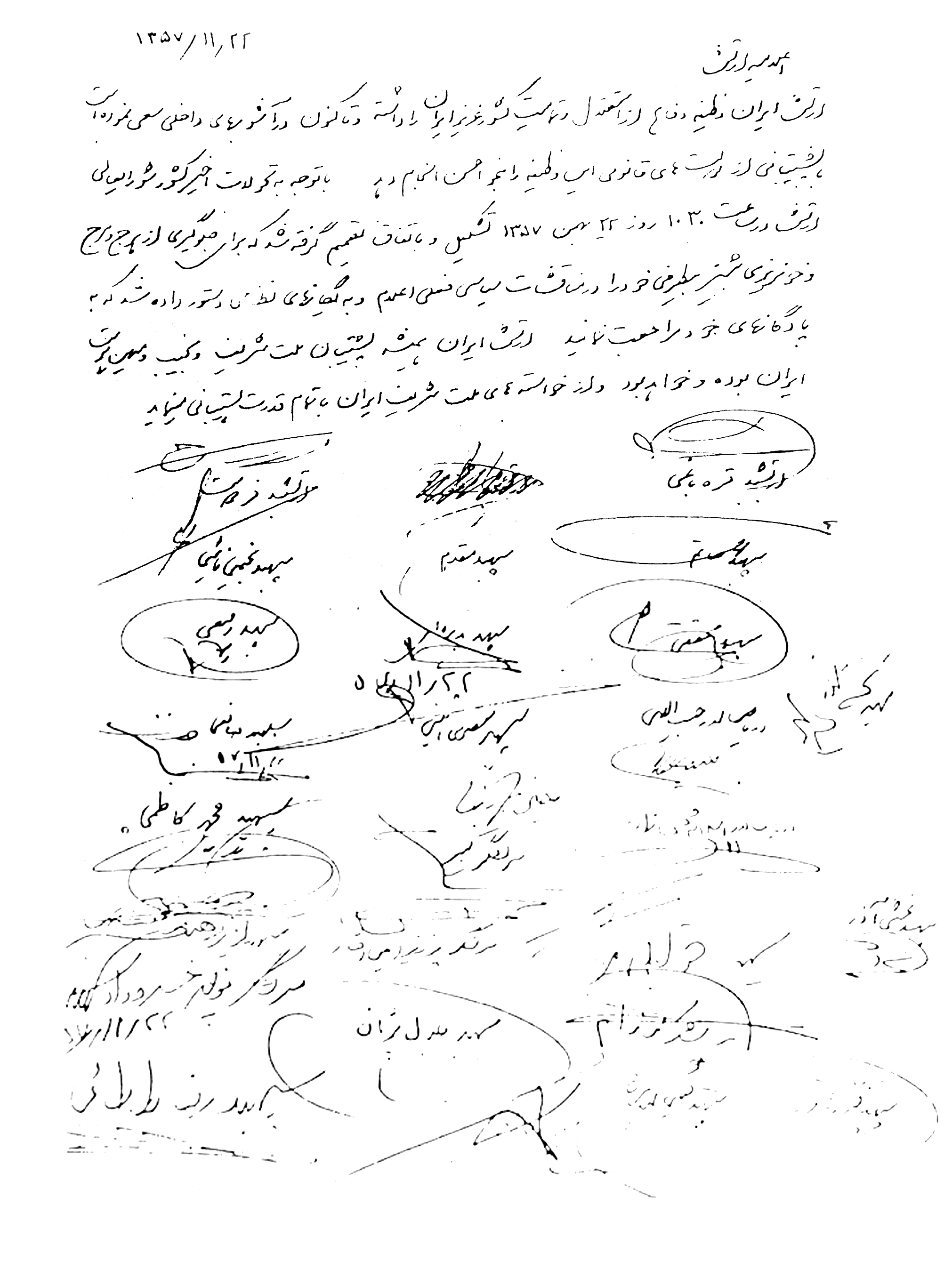
11 February Army announcement, signed by top generals, proclaiming its political neutrality

The final collapse of the Bakhtiar's government came at 10 am (local time) on 11 February when the Supreme Military Council declared itself "neutral in the current political disputes ... in order to prevent further disorder and bloodshed." All military personnel were ordered back to their bases, effectively yielding control of the entire country to Khomeini. Revolutionaries took over government buildings, TV and radio stations, and palaces of the Pahlavi dynasty, marking the end of the monarchy in Iran. Bakhtiar escaped the palace under a hail of bullets, fleeing Iran in disguise.

This period, from 1 to 11 February, is celebrated every year in Iran as the "Decade of Fajr". 11 February is "Islamic Revolution's Victory Day", a national holiday with state sponsored demonstrations in every city.

=== Casualties ===
Some sources (such as Emadeddin Baghi, a researcher at the Martyrs Foundation) claim 2,781 protesters and revolutionaries were killed in 1978–79 during the revolution. (Note: Researcher Emad al-Din Baghi at the Martyrs Foundation (Bonyad Shahid) counted 2,781 protesters killed in 1978–79, a total of 3,164 killed between 1963 and 1979.) Khomeini reported a much larger number, saying "60,000 men, women and children were martyred by the Shah's regime." Military historian Spencer C. Tucker rejected this 60,000 figure as "grossly overstated ... for propaganda purposes". Tucker explains that the consensus of historians regarding estimated deaths during the Iranian Revolution (from January 1978 to February 1979), numbers between 532 and 2,781.

According to the historian Ervand Abrahamian, 8,000 opponents were executed between June 1981 and June 1985 by revolutionary courts as the revolution was consolidated exceeded those killed by the royalist government trying to stop the revolution. According to Tucker's estimations, in the period of 1980 to 1985, between 25,000 and 40,000 Iranians were arrested, 15,000 Iranians were tried, and between 8,000 and 9,500 Iranians were executed, although UN sources note that other estimates are far higher. In 2025 the Iranian government created a parking lot by paving over a section of Behesht-e Zahra cemetery in Tehran that had held the remains of an estimated 5,000 to 7,000 victims of the mass executions that followed the 1979 revolution. The year before, United Nations Special Rapporteur Javaid Rehman described the regime's pattern of destroying graveyards as an attempt to “conceal or erase data that could serve as potential evidence to avoid legal accountability.”

=== Songs of Iranian Revolution ===
The songs most closely associated with the revolution are epic ballads, composed during and in support of the Islamic Revolution and in opposition to the Pahlavi dynasty. Before the revolution was consolidated, these chants were made by various political supporters, and were often recorded on cassette tapes in underground and home studios. In schools, these songs were sung by students as part of the celebrations of Fajr Decades. "Iran Iran" or "Allah Allah" chants are famous revolutionary songs.

== Women's role ==
The Iranian Revolution was a gendered revolution; much of the new regime's rhetoric was centered on the position of women in society. Beyond rhetoric, thousands of women were also heavily mobilized in the revolution itself, and different groups of women actively participated alongside their male counterparts. Not only participating through voting, women also contributed to the revolution through marches, demonstrations and chanting slogans. Women were involved in caring for the wounded, including doctors who responded to calls for help and opened their homes for those who needed assistance. While women themselves were often killed, tortured, arrested or injured and some were involved in guerilla activities, most contributed in non-violent ways. Many women were instrumental not only in being involved in the revolution themselves but in mobilizing men and other non-political women. Many women protested while carrying children and their presence was one of the main reasons for disarming soldiers (who were there on behalf of the regime) who were ordered to shoot if necessary.

=== Ayatollah Khomeini's rhetoric on women's participation ===
Ayatollah Khomeini asserted that "You ladies here have proved that you are at the forefront of this movement. You have a great share in our Islamic movement. The future of our country depends on your support." He invoked the image of the hijab as a symbol of the revolution, saying that "a nation whose respected women demonstrate in modest garb [hejab] to express their disgust with the Shah's regime—such a nation will be victorious." He also said that "women from all levels of society took part in the recent demonstrations, which we are calling the 'referendum of the streets'... women fought side by side with men in the struggle for their independence and their liberty." Khomeini pleaded for women to participate in anti-Shah demonstrations in various cities. Furthermore, women later responded to Khomeini's urgings to vote in favor of the Islamic Republic and the new constitution. Women were so pivotal to the revolution that in response to a suggestion from a top aide to ban women from coming to group audience, Khomeini said "I threw the Shah out with these women, there's no problem in their coming."

After the revolution, Khomeini credited much of the success of the movement to women, even commending the women for mobilizing men, "you ladies have proved that you are in the vanguard of the movement, you have proved that you lead the men, men get their inspiration from you, the men of Iran have learnt lessons from the honourable ladies of Iran ... You are in the vanguard of the movement."

It has been argued that Khomeini and his fellow leaders danced around the issue of women's rights and rather focused their rhetoric on mobilizing women through encouraging them to participate in protests and fueling their anti-Shah sentiments.

=== Variation within women's participation ===
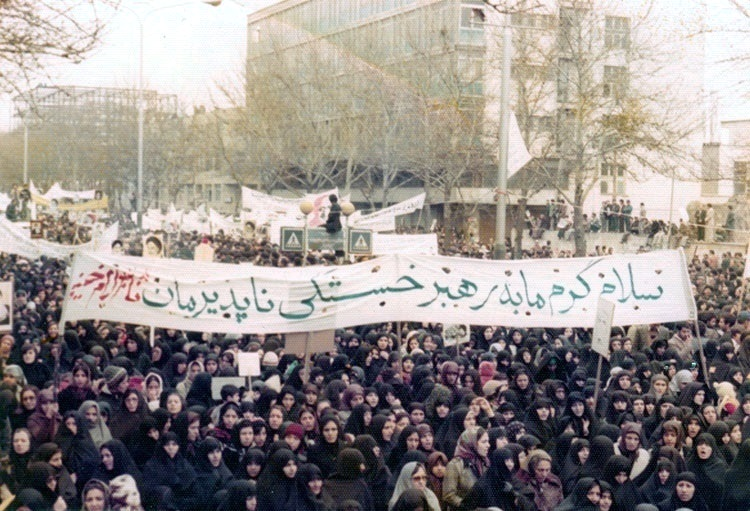

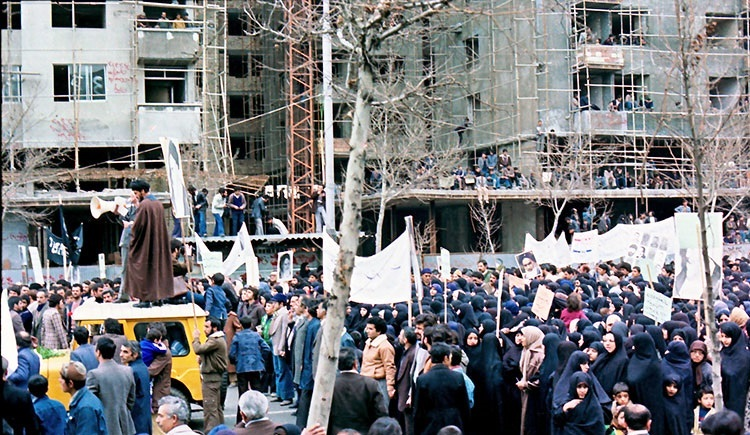
The presence of segregated women in the Tehran Ashura Demonstration, 11 December 1978

The motivations of women for being part of the revolutions were complex and varied among a plethora of religious, political and economic reasons and women participating were from various classes and backgrounds. Many Western educated upper-middle-class women from secular, urban and professional families were involved as well as many women from working-class and rural backgrounds. There were groups as varied as the Fida'iyan-i Khalq, and the Mujahedin were functioning as guerrilla units during the revolutions in opposition to the Shah's regime. There were also other groups of women with various agendas that sometimes converged and sometimes diverged from the Islamic Republic's political positions. For example, organized feminism, which was around since the Pahlavi dynasty, joined the revolutionary movement after the Shah dropped the cabinet position on Women's Affairs to appease the Islamists. Members of the Women's Organization of Iran marched in support for the revolution and it was important that women very much linked to the government also turned against the Shah's regime. Yet, there was some tension later between feminists' dress and the revolution's stance on women's clothing and they began to feel uncomfortable at opposition events.

Some argue that this politicization and mobilization of women made it difficult for the new regime to push them out of the public and political spheres. The revolution resulted in an unprecedented opening for Iranian women into politics (mostly through demonstrations and voting), and some authors argue that this had a lasting impact on Iranian women's political participation and role in the public sphere. Some women were also part of the inner circle of the leaders of the new regime such as Marzieh Hadidchi. Other than the politicization of women, there were particular circumstances during the revolution which pushed women into being involved with politics. For example, "the combination of martial law with its curfew hours and the closing down of shops and workplaces, together with the cold of the fall and winter months resulted in the centers of political discussion often being within the home." Women engaged with news and media as well as political discussions alongside their male counterparts as "the revolution was the only topic of interest to anyone, regardless of age or sex." During 1978 and 1979 there were many gatherings in women's homes where they exchanged interpersonal news and anecdotes. These personal accounts were valuable in a time when the official coverage of news was not trusted by many people.

Women who were activists, religious women and women dissatisfied with the regime were able to unite under the anti-Shah umbrella. However, "women were not united in their opinions of the revolution and its outcome as much as they were not united in their reasons for joining the revolution". Despite this mobilization and high participation rate of women, they were still kept out of leadership positions which were exclusive to men; women are thought to be part of the rank and file rather than the elite strata of the revolution.

=== Academic literature on women's participation ===
While there has been some academic literature exploring individual narratives of women on the revolution, most of the academic work produced focuses on the effect of the revolution on women rather than the role of Iranian women during the revolution. Scholar Guity Nashat highlights this neglected aspect of the revolution, "Although women's participation in the events leading to the 11 February revolution was instrumental in its success, most studies have not addressed the reasons for their involvement or their contribution." Janet Baur argues the necessity of examining the daily lives of women, their living conditions and their relationship to other groups to understand their participation in the socio-political events of the revolution. She further explains that the cultural, ideological, social and material factors shaping the social life and class differences in the period just prior to the revolution need to be studied to understand how the Iranian women's social consciousness developed and how it led them to take part in public protests. Caroline M. Brooks argues that women were left to express their concerns through the protest rather than in the Majlis. Thus, this created a "dangerous bargaining position for activist women" since rather than arguing their position through intellect they were only able to "argue by numbers in the streets and be repelled by force".

There are some contesting understandings in academic literature regarding the reasons behind the mobilization of women. While some argue that the micro-level actions of women can be understood through religious and political ideologies, others argue that it is in fact the effect of manipulations of information, symbols and context which should be studied.

== Aftermath ==
From early 1979 to either 1982 or 1983 Iran was in a "revolutionary crisis mode." After the system of despotic monarchy had been overthrown, the economy and the apparatus of government had collapsed, and military and security forces were in disarray. Yet, by 1982 Khomeini and his supporters had crushed the rival factions, defeated local rebellions and consolidated power.

At the same time, events that made up both the crisis and its resolution were the Iran hostage crisis, the invasion of Iran by Saddam Hussein's Iraq, and the presidency of Abolhassan Banisadr.

=== Ayatollah Khomeini's consolidation of power ===
==== Conflicts among revolutionaries ====
Some observers believe "what began as an authentic and anti-dictatorial popular revolution based on a broad coalition of all anti-Shah forces was soon transformed into an Islamic fundamentalist power-grab," and that except for his core supporters, the members of the coalition thought Khomeini intended to be more of a spiritual guide than a ruler. Khomeini was in his mid-70s, never held public office, had been out of Iran for more than a decade, and told questioners "the religious dignitaries do not want to rule." However, nobody could deny the unanimous central role of the Imam, and the other factions were too small to have any real impact.

Another view is Khomeini had "overwhelming ideological, political and organizational hegemony," and non-theocratic groups never seriously challenged Khomeini's movement in popular support. (Note: For example, Islamic Republic Party and allied forces controlled approximately 80% of the seats on the Assembly of Experts of Constitution. An impressive margin even allowing for electoral manipulation) Supporters of the new rule themselves have claimed that Iranians who opposed Khomeini were "fifth columnists" led by foreign countries attempting to overthrow the Iranian government.

Khomeini and his loyalists in the revolutionary organizations implemented Khomeini's velayat-e faqih design for an Islamic republic led by himself as supreme leader by exploiting temporary allies such as Mehdi Bazargan's Provisional Government of Iran, whom they later eliminated from Iran's political stage one by one.

==== Organizations of the revolution ====
The most important bodies of the revolution were the Revolutionary Council, the Revolutionary Guards, Revolutionary Tribunals, Islamic Republican Party, and Revolutionary Committees (komitehs).

While the moderate Bazargan and his government (temporarily) reassured the middle class, it became apparent they did not have power over the "Khomeinist" revolutionary bodies, particularly the Revolutionary Council (the "real power" in the revolutionary state), and later the Islamic Republican Party. Inevitably, the overlapping authority of the Revolutionary Council (which had the power to pass laws) and Bazargan's government was a source of conflict despite the fact that both had been approved by or put in place by Khomeini.

This conflict lasted only a few months however. The provisional government fell shortly after American Embassy officials were taken hostage on 4 November 1979. Bazargan's resignation was received by Khomeini without complaint, saying "Mr. Bazargan ... was a little tired and preferred to stay on the sidelines for a while." Khomeini later described his appointment of Bazargan as a "mistake."

The Revolutionary Guard, or Pasdaran-e Enqelab, was established by Khomeini on 5 May 1979, as a counterweight both to the armed groups of the left, and to the Shah's military. The guard eventually grew into "a full-scale" military force, becoming "the strongest institution of the revolution."

Serving under the Pasdaran are the Baseej-e Mostaz'afin, volunteers in everything from earthquake emergency management to attacking opposition demonstrators and newspaper offices. The Islamic Republican Party then fought to establish a theocratic government by velayat-e faqih.

Thousands of komiteh or Revolutionary Committees served as "the eyes and ears" of the new rule and are credited by critics with "many arbitrary arrests, executions and confiscations of property."

Also enforcing the will of the government were the Hezbollahi (the Party of God), "strong-arm thugs" who attacked demonstrators and offices of newspapers critical of Khomeini.

Two major political groups that formed after the fall of the Shah that clashed with and were eventually suppressed by pro-Khomeini groups, were the moderate religious Muslim People's Republican Party (MPRP) which was associated with Grand Mohammad Kazem Shariatmadari, and the secular leftist National Democratic Front (NDF).

==== 1979 ethnic uprisings ====
Following the events of the revolution, Marxist guerrillas and federalist parties revolted in some regions comprising Khuzistan, Kurdistan and Gonbad-e Qabus, which resulted in fighting between them and revolutionary forces. These revolts began in April 1979 and lasted between several months to over a year, depending on the region.

=== Establishment of Islamic republic government ===
==== Referendum of 12 Farvardin ====
On 30 and 31 March (Farvardin 10, 11) a referendum was held over whether to replace the monarchy with an "Islamic republic". Khomeini called for a massive turnout and only the National Democratic Front, Fadayan, and several Kurdish parties opposed the vote. The results showed that 98.2% had voted in favor of the Islamic Republic.

==== Writing of the constitution ====
In June 1979 the Freedom Movement released its draft constitution for the Islamic Republic that it had been working on since Khomeini was in exile. It included a Guardian Council to veto un-Islamic legislation, but had no guardian jurist ruler. Leftists found the draft too conservative and in need of major changes but Khomeini declared it 'correct'. To approve the new constitution and prevent leftist alterations, a relatively small seventy-three-member Assembly of Experts for Constitution was elected that summer. Critics complained that "vote-rigging, violence against undesirable candidates and the dissemination of false information" was used to "produce an assembly overwhelmingly dominated by clergy, all took active roles during the revolution and loyal to Khomeini."

Khomeini (and the assembly) now rejected the constitution – its correctness notwithstanding – and Khomeini declared that the new government should be based "100% on Islam."

In addition to the president, the new constitution included a more powerful post of guardian jurist ruler intended for Khomeini, with control of the military and security services, and power to appoint several top government and judicial officials. It increased the power and number of clerics on the Council of Guardians and gave it control over elections as well as laws passed by the legislature.

The new constitution was also approved overwhelmingly by the December 1979 constitutional referendum, but with more opposition (Note: opposition included some clerics, including Ayatollah Mohammad Kazem Shariatmadari, and by secularists such as the National Front who urged a boycott) and smaller turnout.

=== Hostage crisis ===
In late October 1979, the exiled and dying Shah was admitted into the United States for cancer treatment. In Iran there was an immediate outcry, and both Khomeini and leftist groups demanded the Shah's return to Iran for trial and execution. On 4 November 1979 youthful Islamists, calling themselves Muslim Student Followers of the Imam's Line, invaded the US embassy compound in Tehran and seized its staff. Revolutionaries were angry because of how the Shah had left Iran which spawned rumors of another US–backed coup in Iran that would re-install him. The occupation was also intended as leverage to demand the return of the Shah to stand trial in exchange for the hostages, and depose Prime Minister Mehdi Bazargan, who they believed was plotting to normalize relations with the US. The students held 52 American diplomats hostage for 444 days, which played a role in helping to pass the constitution, suppressing moderates, and otherwise radicalising the revolution.

Holding the hostages was very popular and continued even after the death of the Shah. As Khomeini explained to his future President Banisadr, "This action has many benefits. ...This has united our people. Our opponents do not dare act against us. We can put the constitution to the people's vote without difficulty..."

With great publicity the students released documents from the American embassy, which they labeled a "den of spies", showing that moderate Iranian leaders had met with US officials (and did not release similar evidence of high-ranking Islamists having done the same). Among the casualties of the hostage crisis was Prime Minister Bazargan and his government, who resigned in November unable to enforce the government's order to release the hostages.

The prestige of Khomeini and the hostage taking was further enhanced with the failure of a hostage rescue attempt, widely credited to divine intervention.

The hostage crisis ended with the signing of the Algiers Accords in Algeria on 19 January 1981. The hostages were formally released to United States custody the following day, just minutes after Ronald Reagan was sworn in as the new American president.

=== Suppression of opposition ===
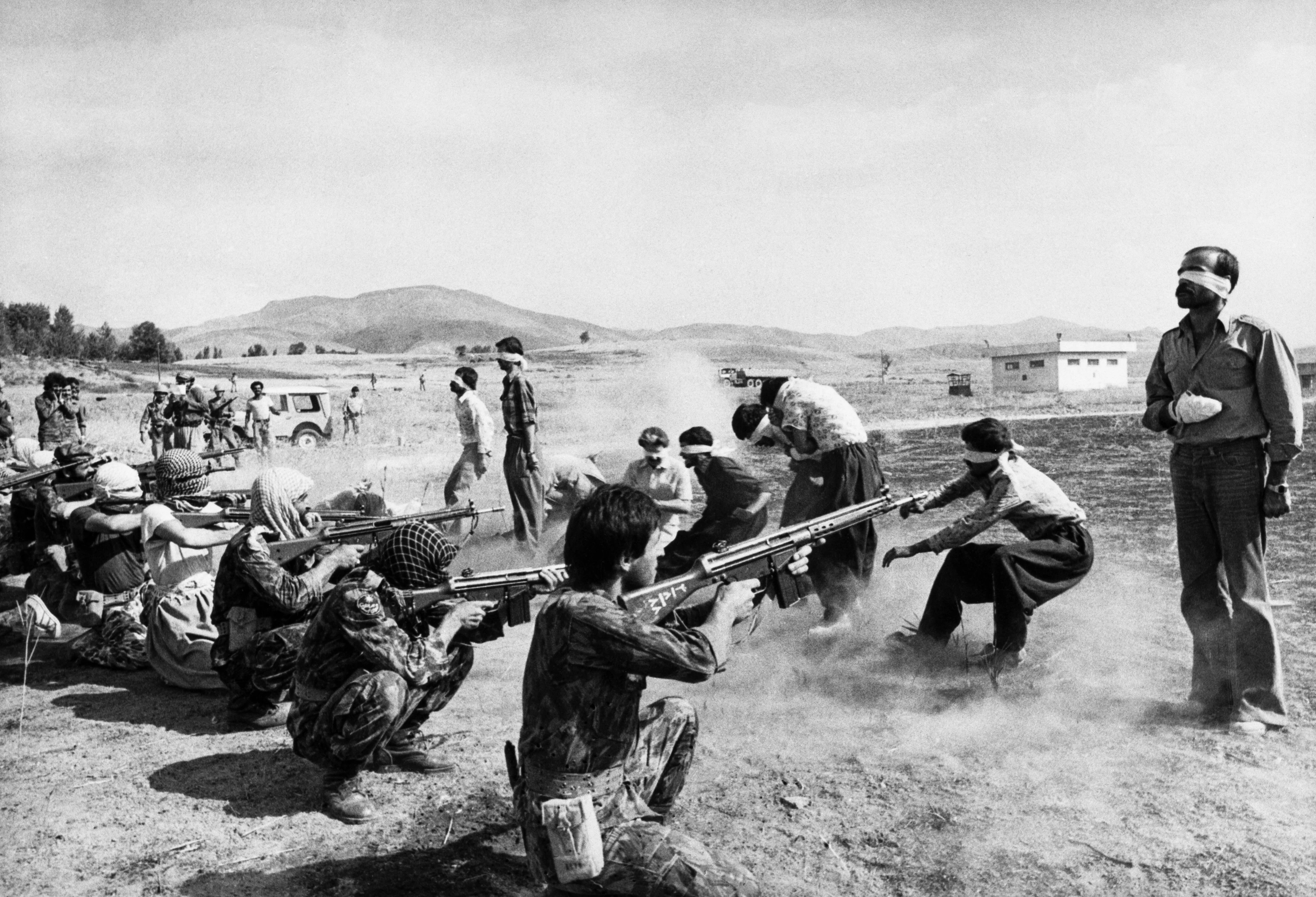
A revolutionary firing squad in 27 August 1979

Khomeini and his followers claimed sole credit for the revolution, sidelining other revolutionary groups. This was possible due to the regime's control over public opinion and historical narrative. In early March 1979, Khomeini announced, "do not use this term, 'democratic.' That is the Western style," giving pro-democracy liberals (and later leftists) a taste of disappointments to come. In succession the National Democratic Front was banned in August 1979, the provisional government was disempowered in November, the Muslim People's Republican Party was banned in January 1980, the People's Mujahedin of Iran guerrillas came under attack in February 1980, a purge of universities started in March 1980, and the liberal Islamist President Abolhassan Banisadr was impeached in June 1981.

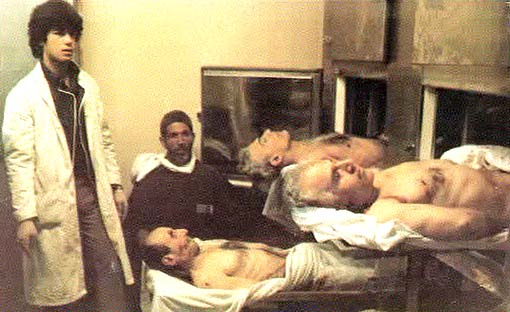
Executed generals of the Imperial Iranian Army: Reza Naji, Mehdi Rahimi, and Manouchehr Khosrodad

After the revolution, human rights groups estimated the number of casualties suffered by protesters and prisoners of the new system to be several thousand. The first to be executed were members of the old system – senior generals, followed by over 200 senior civilian officials – as punishment and to eliminate the danger of a coup d'état. Brief trials lacking defense attorneys, juries, transparency or the opportunity for the accused to defend themselves were held by revolutionary judges such as Sadegh Khalkhali, the Sharia judge. By January 1980 "at least 582 persons had been executed." Among those executed was Amir Abbas Hoveida, former Prime Minister of Iran. Between January 1980 and June 1981, when Bani-Sadr was impeached, at least 900 executions took place, for everything from drug and sexual offenses to "corruption on earth," from plotting counter-revolution and spying for Israel to membership in opposition groups.

==== The 1981–1982 massacre ====
Between June 1981 and March 1982, the theocratic regime carried out the largest political massacre in Iranian history, targeting communists, socialists, social democrats, liberals, monarchists, moderate Islamists, and members of the Baha'i faith as part of the Iranian Cultural Revolution decreed by Khomeini on 14 June 1980 with the intent of "purifying" Iranian society of non-Islamic elements. Between June 1981 and June 1982, Amnesty International documented 2,946 executions, with several thousand more killed in the next two years according to the anti-government guerilla People's Mujahedin of Iran. More recently, Rastyad Collective has verified the identities of more than 3,400 political dissidents who were executed between June 1981 and March 1982. These dissidents were sentenced to death by the Islamic Revolutionary Courts during show trials in more than eighty-five cities across the country on charges of spreading "corruption on Earth" (ifsad-fi-alarz), "espionage", "terrorism", or "enmity against Allah" (Moharebeh). Most victims of the 1981 massacre were young activists aged eleven to twenty-four. These activists were either high school students or had recently graduated from universities in Iran and abroad. During the massacre, hundreds of minors were also subjected to arbitrary detention, torture, and summary executions on ideologically motivated charges of ifsad-fi-alarz and moharebeh by the revolutionary courts. In July 2024, The Special Rapporteur published a landmark UN Report on the 1981 massacre and categorised the atrocity crimes committed in 1981 and 1982 as genocide and crimes against humanity. In this report, the Rapporteur called for the establishment of an independent and international accountability mechanism.

==== Closing of non-Islamist newspapers ====
In mid-August 1979, shortly after the election of the constitution-writing assembly, several dozen newspapers and magazines opposing Khomeini's idea of theocratic rule by jurists were shut down. When protests were organized by the National Democratic Front (NDF), Khomeini angrily denounced them saying, "we thought we were dealing with human beings. It is evident we are not."

... After each revolution several thousand of these corrupt elements are executed in public and burnt and the story is over. They are not allowed to publish newspapers.

Hundreds were injured by "rocks, clubs, chains and iron bars" when Hezbollahi attacked the protesters, and shortly after, a warrant was issued for the arrest of the NDF's leader.

==== Muslim People's Republican Party ====
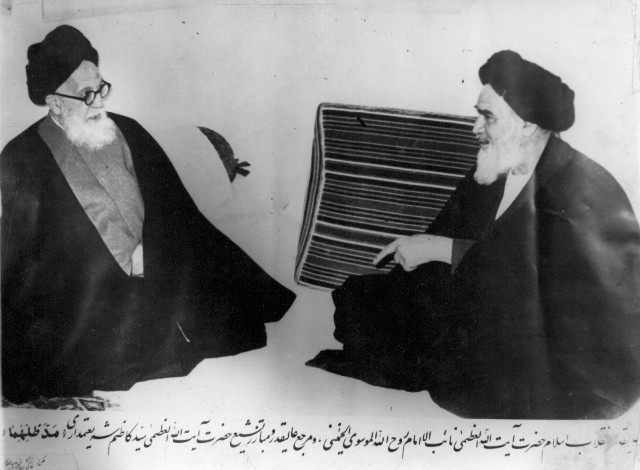
Kazem Shariatmadari and Ayatollah Khomeini

In December the moderate Islamic party Muslim People's Republican Party (MPRP) and its spiritual leader Mohammad Kazem Shariatmadari had become a rallying point for Iranians who wanted democracy not theocracy. Riots broke out in Shariatmadari's Azeri home region with members of the MPRP and Shariatmadari's followers seizing the Tabriz television station and using it to "broadcast demands and grievances." The regime reacted quickly, sending Revolutionary Guards to retake the TV station, mediators to defuse complaints and activists to stage a massive pro-Khomeini counter-demonstration. The party was suppressed, and in 1982 Shariatmadari was "demoted" from the rank of Grand Ayatollah and many of his clerical followers were purged.

==== Islamist left ====
In January 1980, Abolhassan Banisadr was elected president of Iran. Though an adviser to Khomeini, he was a leftist who clashed with another ally of Khomeini, the theocratic Islamic Republic Party (IRP) – the controlling power in the new parliament.

At the same time, erstwhile revolutionary allies of Khomeini – the Islamist modernist guerrilla group People's Mujahedin of Iran (the MEK) – were being suppressed by Khomeini's forces. Khomeini attacked the MEK, referring to them as monafeqin (hypocrites) and kafer (unbelievers). Hezbollahi people attacked meeting places, bookstores, and newsstands of Mujahideen and other leftists, driving them underground. Universities were closed to purge them of opponents of theocratic rule as a part of the "Cultural Revolution", and 20,000 teachers and nearly 8,000 military officers deemed too westernized were dismissed.

By mid-1981 matters came to a head. An attempt by Khomeini to forge a reconciliation between Banisadr and IRP leaders had failed, and now it was Banisadr who was the rallying point "for all doubters and dissidents" of the theocracy, including the MEK.

When leaders of the National Front called for a demonstration in June 1981 in favor of Banisadr, Khomeini threatened its leaders with the death penalty for apostasy "if they did not repent". Leaders of the Freedom Movement of Iran were compelled to make and publicly broadcast apologies for supporting the Front's appeal. Those attending the rally were menaced by Hezbollahi and Revolutionary Guards and intimidated into silence.

On 28 June 1981, a bombing of the office of the IRP killed around 70 high-ranking officials, cabinet members and members of parliament, including Mohammad Beheshti, the secretary-general of the party and head of the Islamic Republic's judicial system. The government arrested thousands, and there were hundreds of executions against the MEK and its followers. Despite these and other assassinations the hoped-for mass uprising and armed struggle against the Khomeiniists was crushed.

In May 1979, the Furqan Group (Guruh-i Furqan) assassinated an important lieutenant of Khomeini, Morteza Motahhari.

== Impacts ==
=== International impact ===
Internationally, the initial impact of the revolution was immense. In the non-Muslim world, it changed the image of Islam, generating much interest in Islam—both sympathetic and hostile—and even speculation that the revolution might change "the world balance of power more than any political event since Hitler's conquest of Europe."

The Islamic Republic positioned itself as a revolutionary beacon under the slogan "neither East nor West, only Islamic Republic" ("Na Sharq, Na Gharb, Faqat Jumhuri-e Islami," i.e., neither Soviet nor American / West European models) and called for the overthrow of capitalism, American influence, and social injustice in the Middle East and the rest of the world. Revolutionary leaders in Iran gave and sought support from non-Muslim activists such as the Sandinistas in Nicaragua, the Irish Republican Army (IRA) in Ireland and the anti-apartheid struggle in South Africa, even favoring far-left revolutionaries over Islamist (but ideologically different and strategically harmful) causes such as the neighboring Afghan Mujahideen. In terms of future relevance, the conflicts that originated from the Iranian Revolution continued to define geo-politics for the following decades.

The revolution itself was supported by the Palestine Liberation Organization (PLO). Chairman Yasser Arafat visited Tehran in February 1979 and received a commitment from Ayatollah Khomeini that Iran would promptly "turn to the issue of victory over Israel," while Arafat cited how the revolution in Iran had "turned upside down" the area's strategic balance, including through the PLO's support of underground fighters in Iran.

In February 1981, the Islamic Republic supported Hunger strikes in the H-Block of the HM Prison Maze by Irish Republicans including Bobby Sands. Following the death of Sands in May 1981, the street in Tehran the British Embassy is on was renamed from "Winston Churchill Street" to "Bobby Sands Street". The IRA saw the Iranian Revolution as aspirational, an example of mass action as a way to meet goals. Both the Iranian government and their opposition supported the hunger strikes, creating a competition for the favor of the IRA. The support by the government came after the UK sided with Iraq and Saddam Hussein in the Iran–Iraq war. Oppositional groups like Mojahedin-e-Khalq claimed solidarity with the hunger strike and connected their Marxist influences. The Iranian government, Iranian leftist groups, and the IRA saw Britain as a colonizing force in both regions. For a time, Mojahedin-e-Khalq and the Provisional Sinn Féin (the political arm of the Provisional IRA) had consistent contact. Contact ended in June 1981 after fear of offending the Iranian Government.

The Islamic Republic changed the foreign policy of the Pahlavi dynasty by supporting third worldist movements like the anti-apartheid movement in South Africa. The Pahlavis and South Africa had relations dating back to when Reza Shah went there in exile. After the first Shah's ousting by the Soviets and British during World War II, he spent the remainder of his life in Johannesburg. Pre-revolution Iran provided 90% of South Africa's oil. After the revolution, Iran cut South Africa off from its oil supply and financially supported the African National Congress. This was part of the larger want by Khomeini to support the "downtrodden" of the world, including, non-aligned countries. In 1980, the ANC attended the "Gather of World Liberation" hosted in Tehran for the third worldist movement. In 2015, the International Relations and Cooperation minister of South Africa said of Iran, "The Islamic Republic stood by us during our darkest days, cutting ties with the apartheid regime. Your revolution was our revolution. You showed us that emancipation was possible, whatever the odds." A connection with the ANC continued even when tested during the apartheid era and the Iran–Iraq war. In 1985, Iran and South Africa traded weapons for oil. The belief in third-worldism seemed to have superseded the change in behavior by Iran.

=== Persian Gulf and the Iran–Iraq War ===
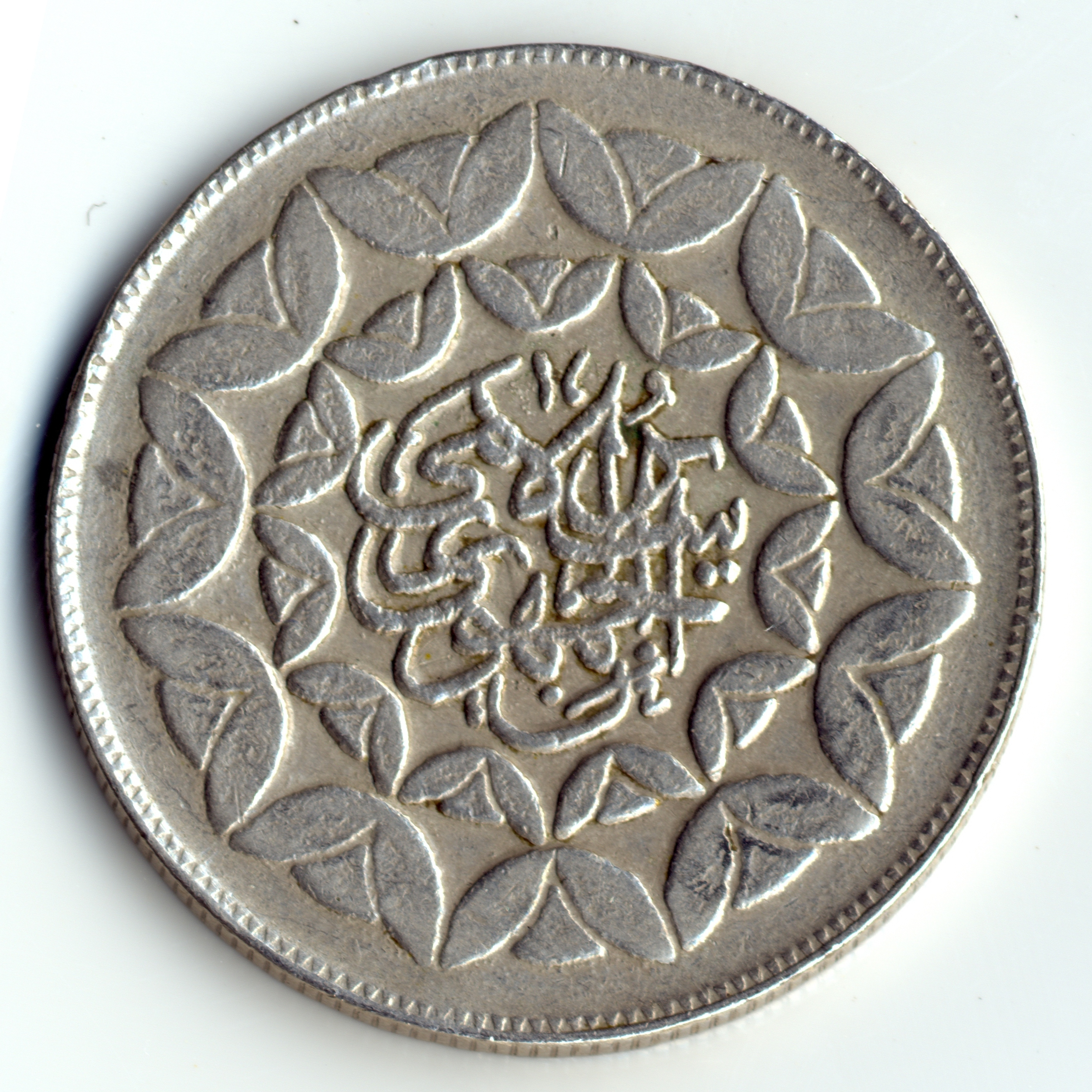
Obverse

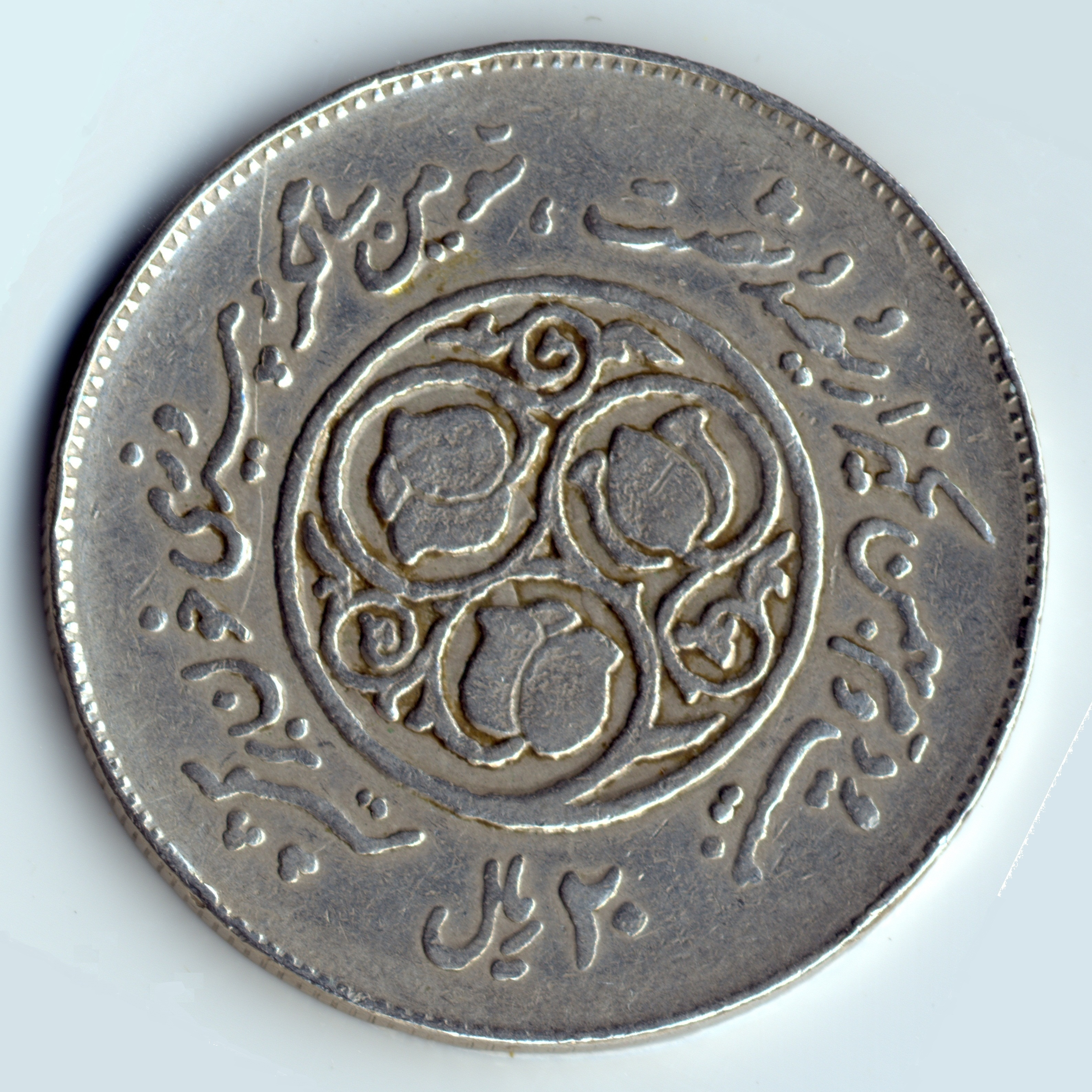
Reverse

Iranian 20 Rials coin – monument of 3rd anniversary of Iranian Revolution

Supporters of the revolution both within and outside of Iran began calling for the overthrow of monarchies in the region and for them to be replaced by Islamic republics. This alarmed many of Iran's neighbours, particularly Kuwait, Iraq and Saudi Arabia as well as Western nations dependent on Middle Eastern oil for their energy needs.

In September 1980, Iraq took advantage of the febrile situation and invaded Iran. At the centre of Iraq's objectives was the annexation of the East Bank of the Shaat Al-Arab waterway that makes up part of the border between the two nations and which had been the site of numerous border skirmishes between the two countries going back to the late 1960s. The president of Iraq, Saddam Hussein, also wanted to annex the Iranian province of Khuzestan, substantially populated by Iranian Arabs. There was also concern that a Shia-centric revolution in Iran may stimulate a similar uprising in Iraq, where the country's Sunni minority ruled over the Shia majority.

Hussein was confident that with Iraq's armed forces being well-equipped with new technology and with high morale would enjoy a decisive strategic advantage against an Iranian military that had recently had much of its command officers purged following the revolution. Iran was also struggling to find replacement parts for much of its US- and British-supplied equipment. Hussein believed that victory would therefore come swiftly.

However, Iran was "galvanized" by the invasion and the populace of Iran rallied behind their new government in an effort to repel the invaders. After some early successes, the Iraqi invasion stalled and was then repelled and by 1982, Iran had recaptured almost all of its territories. In June 1982, with Iraqi forces all but expelled from Iranian territory, the Iraqi government offered a ceasefire. This was rejected by Khomeini, who declared that the only condition for peace was that "the regime in Baghdad must fall and must be replaced by an Islamic republic".

The war would continue for another six years during which time countries like Saudi Arabia, Kuwait and other Gulf states provided financial assistance to Iraq in an effort to prevent an Iranian victory, even though their relations with Iraq were often hostile – Kuwait itself was invaded by Iraq two years after the peace agreement between Iraq and Iran was signed.

The war served in part as an opportunity for the government to strengthen revolutionary ardour and revolutionary groups; the Revolutionary Guard and committees at the expense of its remaining allies-turned-opponents, such as the MEK. While enormously costly and destructive, the war "rejuvenate[d] the drive for national unity and Islamic revolution" and "inhibited fractious debate and dispute" in Iran.

=== Foreign relations ===
The Islamic Republic of Iran experienced difficult relations with some Western countries, especially the United States, Saudi Arabia, and the Eastern Bloc nations led by the Soviet Union. Iran was under constant US unilateral sanctions, which were tightened under the presidency of Bill Clinton. Most European countries, despite their significant investments within Iran, stood in solidarity with the United States and also imposed economic sanctions on the theocratic regime. Britain suspended all diplomatic relations with Iran and did not re-open their embassy in Tehran until 1988. The European country that maintained the closest relations with the new Iranian government was Switzerland, which was neither a part of the European Economic Community nor the North Atlantic Treaty Organization. Relations with the USSR became strained as well after the Soviet government condemned Khomeini's repression of certain minorities after the revolution. Diplomatic relations between Iran and the apartheid government of South Africa were completely severed following Khomeini's rise to power.

In 1950, Iran became the second Muslim-majority country to extend de facto recognition to Israel following its establishment in 1948. After the Shah regained his throne after the 1953 Iranian coup d'état that overthrew prime minister Mohammad Mossadegh, Iran expanded relations between the two nations, posting ambassadors to each other, establishing military contacts and supplying more than half of Israel's oil. Relations were cut on 18 February 1979 when Iran adopted an anti-Zionist stance, with the former Embassy of Israel, Tehran handed over to the Palestine Liberation Organization. Iran has allied and funded several anti-Israeli Islamist militant groups since.

After the US sanctions were tightened and the collapse of the Soviet Union, the Russian Federation and the People's Republic of China became the principal allies for Iran. Relations between the two countries improved after Vladimir Putin took office in 2000 and increasingly warmer in recent years following an international backlash over the annexation of Crimea in 2014 which led to sanctions by the Western powers. Russia had sought Iran on expanding arms trade over the past three decades especially with the cooperation with the Assad government during the Syrian civil war. Iran also began its economic cooperation with China that includes "political, strategic and economic" components between the two nations.

=== In the Muslim world ===
In the Muslim world, particularly in its early years, the revolution inspired enormous enthusiasm and redoubled opposition to western imperialism, intervention and influence. Islamist insurgents rose in Saudi Arabia (1979), Egypt (1981), Syria (1982), and Lebanon (1983).

In Pakistan, it has been noted that the "press was largely favorable towards the new government"; the Islamist parties were even more enthusiastic; while the ruler, General Zia-ul-Haq, himself on an Islamization drive since he took power in 1977, talked of "simultaneous triumph of Islamic ideology in both our countries" and that "Khomeini is a symbol of Islamic insurgence." Some American analysts noted that, at this point, Khomeini's influence and prestige in Pakistan was greater than Zia-ul-Haq's himself. After Khomeini claimed that Americans were behind the 1979 Grand Mosque seizure, student protesters from the Quaid-e-Azam University in Islamabad attacked the US embassy, setting it on fire and taking hostages. While the crisis was quickly defused by the Pakistan military, the next day, before some 120 Pakistani army officers stationed in Iran on the road to hajj, Khomeini said, "it is a cause of joy that ... all Pakistan has risen against the United States" and the struggle is not that of the US and Iran but "the entire world of disbelief and the world of Islam." According to journalist Yaroslav Trofimov, "the Pakistani officers, many of whom had graduated from Western military academies, seemed swayed by the ayatollah's intoxicating words."

Ultimately only the Lebanese Islamists succeeded. The Islamic revolutionary government itself is credited with helping establish Hezbollah in Lebanon and the Supreme Council for the Islamic Revolution in Iraq.

On the other side of the ledger, at least one observer argues that despite great effort and expense the only countries outside Iran the revolution had a "measure of lasting influence" on are Lebanon and Iraq. Others claim the devastating Iran–Iraq War "mortally wounded ... the ideal of spreading the Islamic revolution," or that the Islamic Republic's pursuit of an ideological rather than a "nationalist, pragmatic" foreign policy has weakened Iran's "place as a great regional power".

=== Domestic impact ===
Views differ on the impact of the revolution. (Note: example: "Secular Iranian writers of the early 1980s, most of whom supported the revolution, lamented the course it eventually took.") For some it was "the most significant, hopeful and profound event in the entirety of contemporary Islamic history", while other Iranians believe that the revolution was a time when "for a few years we all lost our minds", and which "promised us heaven, but... created a hell on earth."

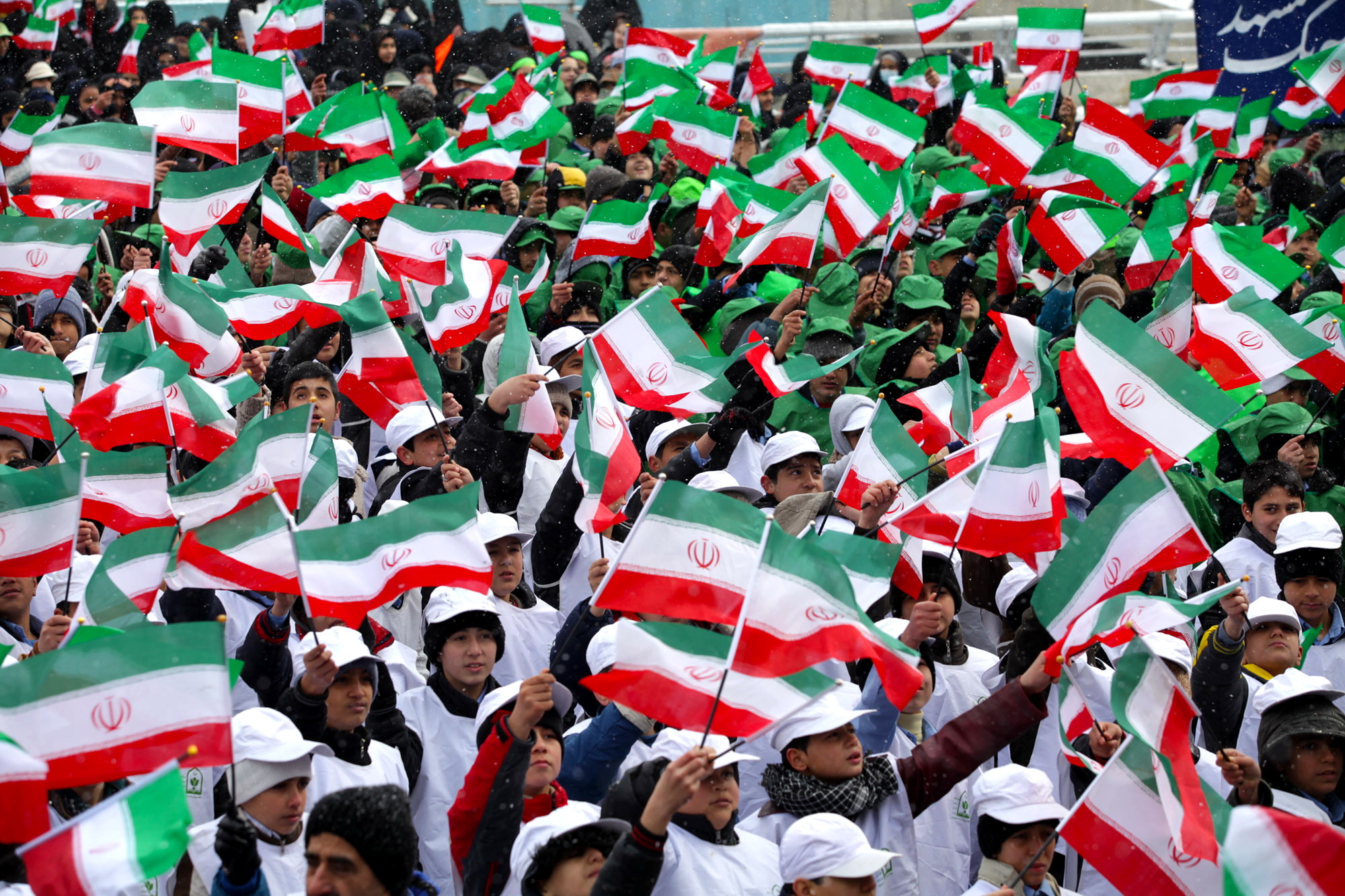
People celebrating anniversary of the revolution in Mashhad in 2014

Internally, Iran has had some success with the governmental promotion of Islam, and the elimination of secularism and American influence in government. Criticisms have been raised with regards to political freedom, governmental honesty and efficiency, economic equality and self-sufficiency, or even popular religious devotion. Opinion polls and observers report widespread dissatisfaction, including a "rift" between the revolutionary generation and younger Iranians who find it "impossible to understand what their parents were so passionate about." To honor the 40th anniversary of revolution around 50,000 prisoners were forgiven by order Ali Khamenei to receive "Islamic clemency". Many religious minorities such as Christians, Baháʼís, Jews and Zoroastrians have had to flee Iran since the Islamic Revolution of 1979.

Literacy has continued to increase under the Islamic Republic. By 2002, illiteracy rates dropped by more than half. Maternal and infant mortality rates have also been cut significantly. Population growth was first encouraged but discouraged after 1988. Overall, Iran's Human development Index rating has climbed significantly from 0.569 in 1980 to 0.732 in 2002, on a par with neighbouring Turkey. In the latest HDI, however, Iran has since fallen 8 ranks below Turkey.

=== Politics and government ===
Iran has elected governmental bodies at the national, provincial, and local levels. Although these bodies are subordinate to theocracy – which has veto power over who can run for parliament (or Islamic Consultative Assembly) and whether its bills can become law – they have more power than equivalent organs in the Shah's government.

Iran's Sunni minority (about 8%) has seen some unrest. Five of the 290 parliamentary seats are allocated to their communities.

The members of the Baháʼí Faith have been declared heretical and subversive. While persecution occurred before the revolution since then more than 200 Baháʼís have been executed or presumed killed, and many more have been imprisoned, deprived of jobs, pensions, businesses, and educational opportunities. Baháʼí holy places have been confiscated, vandalized, or destroyed. More recently, Baháʼís in Iran have been deprived of education and work. Several thousand young Baháʼís between the ages of 17 and 24 have been expelled from universities.

Whether the Islamic Republic has brought more or less severe political repression is disputed. Grumbling once done about the tyranny and corruption of the Shah and his court is now directed against "the Mullahs." Fear of SAVAK has been replaced by fear of Revolutionary Guards, and other religious revolutionary enforcers. Violations of human rights by the theocratic government is said to be worse than during the monarchy, and in any case extremely grave. Reports of torture, imprisonment of dissidents, and the murder of prominent critics have been made by human rights groups. Censorship is handled by the Ministry of Culture and Islamic Guidance, without whose official permission, "no books or magazines are published, no audiotapes are distributed, no movies are shown and no cultural organization is established. Men and women are not allowed to dance or swim with each other."

=== Women ===
Throughout the beginning of the 20th century and prior to the revolution, many women leaders emerged and demanded basic social rights for women. During the reign of Reza Shah, the government mandated the removal of the veil and promoted the education of young girls. However, the push-back of the Shia clerics made progress difficult, and the government had to contain its promotion of basic women's rights to the norms of the patriarchal social hierarchy to accommodate the clerics. After the abdication of Reza Shah in 1941, the discipline of the government decreased, and women were able to further exercise their rights, including the ability to wear the veil if they wanted. More organization of women's groups occurred in the 1960s and 70s, and they used the government's modernization to define and advocate for women's issues. During these decades, women became active in formerly male domains such as the parliament, the cabinet, armed forces, legal professions, and fields of science and technology. Additionally, women achieved the right to vote in 1963. Many of these achievements and rights that Iranian women had gained in the decades leading up to the revolution were reversed by the Islamic Revolution.

The revolutionary government rewrote laws in an attempt to force women to leave the workforce by promoting the early retirement of female government employees, the closing of childcare centers, enforcing full Islamic cover in offices and public places, as well as preventing women from studying in 140 fields in higher education. Women fought back against these changes, and as activist and writer Mahnaz Afkhami writes, "The regime succeeded in putting women back in the veil in public places, but not in resocializing them into fundamentalist norms." After the revolution, women often had to work hard to support their families as the post-revolutionary economy suffered. Women also asserted themselves in the arts, literature, education, and politics.

Women – especially those from traditional backgrounds – participated on a large scale in demonstrations leading up to the revolution. They were encouraged by Ayatollah Khomeini to join him in overthrowing the Pahlavi dynasty. However, most of these women expected the revolution to lead to an increase in their rights and opportunities rather than the restrictions that actually occurred. The policy enacted by the revolutionary government and its attempts to limit the rights of women were challenged by the mobilization and politicization of women that occurred during and after the revolution. Women's resistance included remaining in the work force in large numbers and challenging Islamic dress by showing hair under their head scarves. The Iranian government has had to reconsider and change aspects of its policies towards women because of their resistance to laws that restrict their rights.

Since the revolution, university enrollment and the number of women in the civil service and higher education has risen. (Note: It reached 66% in 2003.) and several women have been elected to the Iranian parliament.

=== Homosexuality ===
When Ruhollah Khomeini came to power in 1979, he called for homosexuals to be "exterminated", and one of his first political actions was to institute imprisonment, corporal punishment, and the death penalty for any sexual acts outside traditional Islamic heterosexual marriage. In a 1979 interview with The New York Times, a journalist asked Khomeini to justify the state-sanctioned shootings of homosexuals. In reply Khomeini compared them as well as other adulterers to gangrene, thieves, and murderers.

Iran is currently one of the world's only jurisdictions to actively execute gay men. Amnesty International reports that approximately 5,000 homosexuals have been executed in Iran since the revolution.

=== Economic impact ===
Iran's post-revolutionary economy has a significant state-owned or parastatal sector, including businesses owned by the Revolutionary Guards and Bonyad foundations.

Since the revolution Iran's GDP (PPP) has grown from $114 billion in 1980 to $858 billion in 2010. GDP per capita (PPP) has grown from $4,295 in 1980 to $11,396 in 2010.

Since the revolution Iran's GDP (Nominal) has grown from $90.392 billion in 1979 to $385.874 in 2015. GDP per capita (nominal) has grown from $2290 in 1979 to $5470 in 2016. Real GNI per capita in 2011 constant international dollars decreased after the revolution and during the Iran-Iraq war from $7762 in 1979 to $3699 at the end of the war in 1989. After three decades of reconstruction and growth since then, it has not yet reached its 1979 level and has only recovered to $6751 in 2016. Data on GNI per capita in PPP terms is only available since 1990 globally. In PPP terms, GNI per capita has increased from Int. $11,425 in 1990 to Int. $18,544 in 2016. But most of this increase can be attributed to the rise in oil prices in the 2000s.

The value of Iran's currency declined precipitously after the revolution. Whereas on 15 March 1978, 71.46 rials equaled one US dollar, in January 2018, 44,650 rials amounted to one dollar.

The economy has become slightly more diversified since the revolution, with 80% of Iranian GDP dependent on oil and gas as of 2010. The Islamic Republic lags some countries in transparency and ease of doing business according to international surveys. Transparency International ranked Iran 136th out of 175 countries in transparency (i.e., lack of corruption) for its 2014 index; and the IRI was ranked 130th out of the 189 countries surveyed in the World Bank 2015 Doing Business Report.

=== Islamic political culture ===
It is said that there were attempts to incorporate modern political and social concepts into Islamic canon since 1950. The attempt was a reaction to the secular political discourse, namely Marxism, liberalism and nationalism. Following the death of Ayatollah Boroujerdi, some of the scholars like Murtaza Mutahhari, Muhammad Beheshti and Mahmoud Taleghani found new opportunity to change conditions. Before them, Boroujerdi was considered a conservative Marja. They tried to reform conditions after the death of the ayatollah. They presented their arguments by rendering lectures in 1960 and 1963 in Tehran. The result of the lectures was the book An Inquiry into Principles of Mar'jaiyat. Some of the major issues highlighted were the government in Islam, the need for the clergy's independent financial organization, Islam as a way of life, advising and guiding youth and necessity of being community. Allameh Tabatabei refers to velayat as a political philosophy for Shia and velayat faqih for Shia community. There are also other attempts to formulate a new attitude of Islam such as the publication of three volumes of Maktab Tashayyo. Also some believe that it is indispensable to revive the religious gathered in Hoseyniyeh-e-Ershad.To expand this revolution many cleric's from several nation are working hard. From Pakistan Allama Syed Jawad Naqvi is the prominent shia cleric defending and promoting Islamic Revolution and the ideology of Wilayat Faqeeh.

== Depictions in Western media ==
- Whirlwind, a novel by James Clavell (1986), portrays the events in February and March, 1979, involving the characters from the fictional company Noble House. Most of the locations in the novel are real, and historical personalities are frequently mentioned in the background story.
- Argo, starring Ben Affleck, dramatizes the execution of the Canadian Caper during the Iranian hostage crisis.
- House of Sand and Fog, starring Jennifer Connelly, is a fictional portrayal of an exiled Iranian military officer and his family.
- Persepolis is an autobiographical series of comics by Marjane Satrapi first published in 2000 that depicts the author's childhood in Iran during and after the Islamic Revolution. The 2007 animated film Persepolis is based upon on it.
- Septembers of Shiraz is a movie about an Iranian Jewish family. After creating a prosperous life in Iran, they may be forced to abandon everything as a revolution looms on the horizon. It is based on the 2007 novel The Septembers of Shiraz by Dalia Sofer.
- 1979 Revolution: Black Friday, a 2016 video game set in the backdrop of the Iranian Revolution.
- Iran and the West, a three-part British documentary series shown in February 2009 on the BBC.

== See also ==
=== Revolution-related topics ===
- 1979 oil crisis
- Background and causes of the Iranian Revolution
- Civil resistance
- Conspiracy theories about the Iranian Revolution
- Fajr decade
- Guadeloupe Conference
- History of Iran
- History of the Islamic Republic of Iran
- Iran hostage crisis
- Islamic fundamentalism in Iran
- Jimmy Carter's engagement with Ruhollah Khomeini
- Non-cooperation movement (2024)
- Organizations of the Iranian Revolution
- Preference falsification
- Russian Revolution
- Timeline of the Iranian Revolution
- White Revolution

=== Related conflicts ===
- 1953 Iranian coup d'état
- 1979 Qatif Uprising
- Iran–Iraq War
- 1983–1986 Kurdish rebellions in Iraq
- List of modern conflicts in the Middle East
- Persian Constitutional Revolution

=== General ===
- Human rights in the Islamic Republic of Iran
- International rankings of Iran
- Island of Stability (speech)
- Left-wing guerrilla groups of Iran
- People's Mojahedin Organization of Iran
- Persecution of Baháʼís
- Women's rights in Iran
