= The Septembers of Shiraz =

Dalia Sofer's debut novel

- The old version of the cover
- Author: Dalia Sofer
- Cover artist: Allison Saltzman
- Language: English
- Genre: Historical Fiction
- Publisher: Harper Perennial
- English publication date: 2008
- Media type: Book
- Pages: 340
- ISBN: 978-0-06-113041-0

The Septembers of Shiraz (2007) is a debut novel by Iranian American author Dalia Sofer.

It narrates the lives of a well-to-do Iranian family during and after the Iranian revolution which additionally overthrew the Shah and ushered in the Islamic republic. There is also a subplot involving a Hasidic family in New York.

The book's new cover is designed by Claire Vaccaro.

The new cover of the book

== Awards and honors ==
- 2007 New York Times Notable Book of the Year
- 2007 National Jewish Book Award, finalist
- 2008 PEN/Robert W. Bingham Prize, winner
- 2008 Orange Prize, longlist
- 2009 International Dublin Literary Award, longlist
- 2009 Sami Rohr Prize for Jewish Literature Choice Award, winner

== Notes ==
- In 2009, the novel was selected for the eighth annual Austin, Texas, Mayor's Book Club challenge – "an annual citywide reading campaign to develop a community experience through reading and discussion of shared books."
