= Timeline of the Iranian Revolution =

This article is a timeline of events relevant to the Islamic Revolution in Iran. For earlier events refer to Pahlavi dynasty and for later ones refer to History of the Islamic Republic of Iran. This article doesn't include the reasons of the events and further information is available in Islamic revolution of Iran.

== Prelude ==
- 1905: Constitutional Revolution of Iran. Persian Constitution of 1906 is enacted, transforming the Qajar dynasty into a constitutional monarchy.
- May 1908: A British expedition discovers oil at the Masjed Soleyman oil field in southern Persia.
- July 1914: As the Burmah Oil faces near-bankruptcy due to managerial incompetence, the British government, spearheaded by Winston Churchill, purchases a majority stake in its Iranian subsidiary, the Anglo-Persian Oil Company (APOC).
- 1914–1918: Persian Campaign. Although the Qajar dynasty declares neutrality in World War I, the country is occupied by British and Russian forces, turning into a battlefield against the Ottoman Empire. Following the collapse of the Russian Empire, Britain utilizes Persia as a transit route to support the White Army, prompting retaliatory Soviet incursions and pillaging. As a result, approximately two million people — 20% of the Persian population — perish from famine and disease, resulting in a higher mortality rate than any official combatant nations in World War I.
- December 15, 1925: Reza Khan, the commander of the Persian Cossack Brigade, deposes the Qajar dynasty and establishes the Pahlavi dynasty.

=== 1930s ===
- April 29, 1933: An oil concession renegotiation agreement is signed between Persia and Britain (APOC). While slightly increasing Persia's share of revenues, the agreement extends Britain's exclusive monopoly rights for an additional 60 years, laying the groundwork for the oil nationalization movement of the 1950s.
- March 21, 1935: Reza Shah Pahlavi officially changes the international name of the country from Persia to Iran.
- August 1935: Goharshad Mosque rebellion.
- January 8 1936: Implementation of Kashf-e hijab (unveiling decree).
- 1939: Mahmoud Taleghani is arrested for the first time due to anti-government activities, including protest to ban on hijab.

=== 1940s ===
- August–September 1941: World War II allies Britain and Soviet Union invade Iran to secure railway to supply Soviet Union. They depose Reza Shah whom they consider too sympathetic to the Germany, and they exile him to South Africa. His son Mohammad Reza becomes the new Pahlavi Shah of Iran.
- October 2, 1941: Foundation of the Tudeh Party of Iran, a Marxist-Leninist political party.
- 1941-1943: Operation Persian Corridor. British, Soviet, and American forces seize control of Iranian railways and roads and vehicles to supply US and British Lend-Lease supplies to the Soviet Union. Widespread resource shortages nationwide trigger a massive famine and typhus epidemic.
- November 30, 1943: The Tehran Conference commences. Seeking to escape British influence, the Shah pleads for a meeting with U.S. President Franklin D. Roosevelt, managing to secure a brief ten-minute audience during a recess, though Roosevelt remains dismissive.
- 1946: Iran crisis. Joseph Stalin refuses to withdraw occupying forces from Iranian Azerbaijan and demands oil concessions. This marks the first major fracture among the World War II Allies — the USA, the UK, and the Soviet Union — signaling the onset of the Cold War. Meanwhile, the Tudeh Party sides with the Soviet Union.
- March 11, 1946: Emergence of the Islamic fundamentalist terrorist group Fada'iyan-e Islam, which assassinates secularist historian and theologian Ahmad Kasravi.
- October 22, 1947: Following the withdrawal of Soviet forces, the Iranian Parliament rejects the ratification of the Soviet-Iranian oil agreement by a vote of 102 to 2.
- January 1948: More than 100 leaders and prominent members including Jalal Al-e-Ahmad and Khalil Maleki, disillusioned with the Tudeh Party, defect from the party and establish the Third Force.
- February 4, 1949: Assassination attempt on the Shah during his visit to Tehran University. The regime blames the Tudeh Party, leading to the party being banned and forced underground.
- November 12, 1949: Foundation of the National Front of Iran, a broad-based coalition advocating for oil nationalization.

=== 1950s ===
- 1950–1951: Borujerdi-Safavi discord. Grand Ayatollah Hossein Borujerdi, the supreme authority of the all Shi'a world, denounces the actions of Fada'iyan-e Islam as mere banditry and expels them from Qom seminary. In response, Navvab Safavi incites campaigns to defrock Borujerdi and his loyalist clerics. While Ruhollah Khomeini sympathized with Safavi's Islamic extremism, his inability to defy his Grand Master kept him silent as he discreetly attempted to mediate behind the scenes.
- March 7, 1951: Prime Minister Ali Razmara, who had spoken against oil nationalization, is assassinated by Fada'iyan-e Islam.
- March 15, 1951: Parliament passes the bill to nationalize the Anglo-Iranian Oil Company (AIOC).
- April 1951: Cabinet of Mohammad Mossaddegh is formed.
- May 1, 1951: Expropriation of AIOC assets begins, sparking the Abadan Crisis.
- July 1952: Following the fall of the first Mossaddegh cabinet, a popular uprising erupts, leading to the formation of the second Mossaddegh cabinet. The Shah is stripped of his authority to appoint the Minister of Defense and the Chief of Staff of the Army, effectively losing all practical power.
- August 8, 1952: Ayatollah Abol-Ghasem Kashani, a supporter of Prime Minister Mohammad Mossaddegh, and protector of Fada'iyan-e Islam, is elected as the 14th Speaker of the Majlis.
- Octoboer 1952: Relations sour between Ayatollah Kashani and Prime Minister Mossaddegh. Kashani colludes with General Fazlollah Zahedi to plot a coup d'état. However, the Senate is dissolved by the Majlis, causing General Zahedi to lose his parliamentary immunity as a senator and be forced into hiding. The prospects of a British-backed coup are thwarted.
- January 2, 1953: Ayatollah Ali-Akbar Borqai, a pro-leftist cleric and member of the Tudeh Party's front organization, Jamiyate Havadaran-e Solh (Association of Peace Supporters), returns to Iran after attending the International Peace Conference in Vienna. Demonstrators organized by anti-Mossaddegh conspirators assemble in Qom, welcoming Borqei with the slogan "Death to Islam, the Quran, and Ayatollah Borujerdi" — a false-flag operation designed to drive a wedge between Mossaddegh and the clergies. Enraged by the news, Fada'iyan-e Islam students rush to the scene and engage in bloody clashes with the demonstrators. In response, Grand Ayatollah Borujerdi tasks Ruhollah Khomeini with investigating the incident, handling the press response, and filing lawsuits.
- February 28, 1953: 9 Esfand coup attempt. Ayatollah Kashani mobilizes large-scale pro-Shah royalist demonstrations. Shaban Jafari, a notorious mob boss, rams a jeep through the front gate of Mossaddegh's residence. Mossaddegh flees in his pajamas.
- March 1953: Dwight D. Eisenhower administration resolves to orchestrate a coup d'état to depose Mohammad Mossaddegh.
- April 4, 1953: A sum of one million dollars in is delivered to the CIA Tehran station for the ouster of Mossaddegh.
- June 25, 1953: The detailed plan for the coup is presented at the United States Department of State. The launch of Operation Ajax is unanimously approved.
- August 1953: Shah Muhammad Reza Pahlavi, who had resisted for months despite British and American calls for him to dismiss Prime Minister Mohammed Mossaddegh, gets nervous about the popular nationalist prime minister's designs when Mossadegh dissolved the parliament and began rule by decree.
- August 15, 1953: The Shah dismisses Mossaddegh as prime minister. Meanwhile, TPMO, a secret Tudeh military wing infiltrated within the armed forces, detects the coup plot and provides intelligence to Mossaddegh. Anticipating the coup, Mossaddegh refuses to step down and instead arrests colonel Nematollah Nassiri, the royal messenger delivering the dismissal order.
- August 16, 1953: In a panic, the Shah flees to Italy.
- August 17, 1953: Emboldened by the situation, the Tudeh Party demands the abolition of the monarchy and the proclamation of a republic, pressuring the Mossaddegh cabinet, but is subsequently suppressed by Mossaddegh utilizing military and police forces.

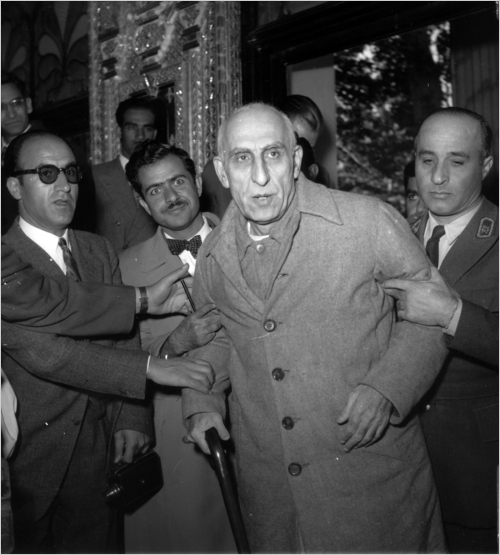
Mossadegh, brought to trial on November 8 after being deposed

- August 19, 1953: The actual coup d'état takes place, leading to the overthrow of Mossaddegh. The Tudeh Party's overt organization is decimated, and its leadership flees into exile abroad, effectively neutralizing the party. This coup marks the first direct U.S. intervention in Iranian politics, launching deep American involvement and sealing the Shah's image as an American puppet.
- August 22, 1953: The Shah returns to Iran and proclaims this day as the "National Resurrection Day."
- September 26, 1953: A sum of 1,000 USD, followed by an additional 500 USD a week later, is delivered to Ayatollah Mohammad Behbahani. Behbahani was a key figure who accepted American slush funds during the chaos of the second Mossaddegh cabinet, and distributed money to anti-Mossaddegh factions to destabilize the society.
- December 3–9, 1953: An international Islamist conference organized by the Muslim Brotherhood is held in Jordanian-controlled East Jerusalem. From Iran, Navvab Safavi, the founder of Fada'iyan-e Islam, attends and meets Sayyid Qutb. Safavi maintained a highly close relationship with Ruhollah Khomeini.
- 1954: First edition of Mahmoud Taleghani's book Islam and Ownership is published.
- November 17 1955: Fada'iyan-e Islam attempts to assassinate Prime Minister Hossein Ala', but the attempt fails.
- Late November 1955: Mahmoud Taleghani is arrested on charges of harboring Navvab Safavi.
- March 12, 1957: Foundation of the secret police SAVAK with the assistance of CIA advisors, marking the beginning of systemic surveillance and intensified political terror.

=== 1960s ===
- July–August 1960: Parliamentary general elections. Following mass protests by the opposition and the public exposing widespread electoral fraud, the Shah invalidates the election results and dissolves the parliament.
- March 31 1961: Husain Borujerdi, the last Iranian Marja-e Taqlid-e Mutlaq (absolute source of emulation) of all Shi'a, dies. With the death of Borujerdi, the Iranian Shi'a leadership becomes divided among multiple Grand Ayatollahs, allowing Khomeini to rise to prominence. His emergence was signaled by the publication of some of his writings on fiqh, most importantly the basic handbook of religious practice entitled, like others of its genre, Tozih al-Masael. He was soon accepted as Marja-e Taqlid (source of imitation) by a large number of Iranian Shi'is. In this year his students, who were the teachers of seminary, established Society of Seminary Teachers of Qom, which played key role during establishment of new government after victory of revolution.
- May 17, 1961: The Freedom Movement of Iran is founded after Islamists (including Mehdi Bazargan, Mahmoud Taleghani, Yadollah Sahabi, Hassan Nazih, Ezzatollah Sahabi, Ali Shariati, Ebrahim Yazdi, Mostafa Chamran, Sadegh Ghotbzadeh, Sadegh Tabatabaei, etc.) break away from the National Front.
- 1962: Jalal Al-e-Ahmad clandestinely publishes Gharbzadegi.
- October–November 1962: Khomeini organizes opposition to the Shah's Local council election bill. The Bill introduced by Shah's government allows women to vote for the first time and non-Muslims to run for councils. Religious pressure forces government to back down completely and abandon the bill. Khomeini emerges from fight as "the regime's principal political foe" and "undisputed spiritual leader of ... bazaari activists."

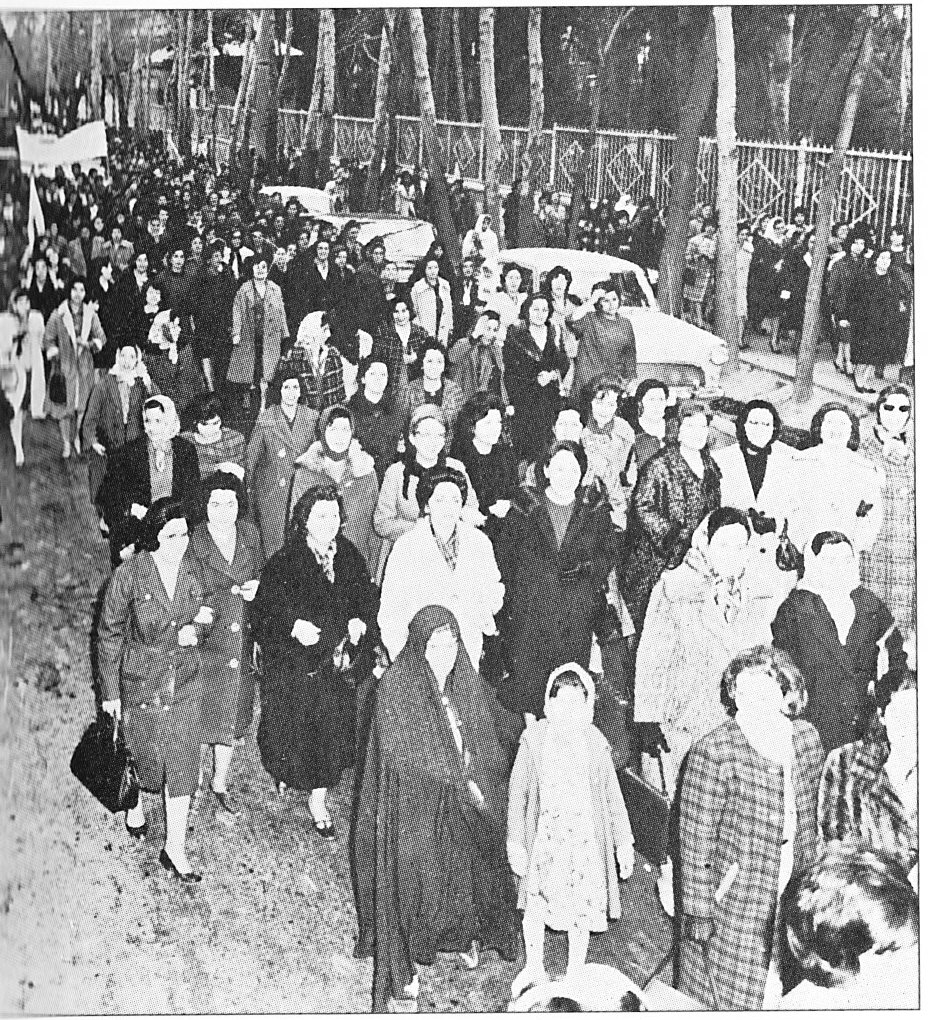
Rally of women in support of the White Revolution

- January 1963: Mohammad Reza Pahlavi proposes "White Revolution". The government introduces a six-point reform bill to be put to a nationwide referendum vote. Six points also included Women's suffrage, as well as other reforms. Khomeini summoned a meeting of his colleagues in Qom to press upon them the necessity of opposing the Shah's plans.
- January 9, 1963: The initial six points of the White Revolution referendum (including land reform, forest nationalization, privatization of state-owned enterprises, profit-sharing, women's suffrage, and a literacy corps) are proposed. Khomeini summons his colleagues in Qom to urge opposition to the Shah's plans.
- January 22 1963: Khomeini issued a strongly worded declaration denouncing the Shah and his plans. Two days later Shah took armored column to Qom, and he delivered a speech harshly attacking the ulama. Khomeini continues his denunciation of the Shah's programs, issuing a manifesto that also bore the signatures of eight other senior scholars. In it he listed the various ways in which the Shah had violated the constitution, condemned the spread of moral corruption in the country, and accused the Shah of comprehensive submission to America and Israel. He also decrees that the Norouz celebrations for the Iranian year 1342 be canceled as a sign of protest against government policies.
- January 26, 1963: The White Revolution referendum passes with a 99.93% approval rate. The National Front and the Freedom Movement boycott the vote.
- April 1963: The Islamic Coalition Party is established, rooted in the bazaari and traditionalist clerics.
- June 3, 1963: Khomeini harshly denounces the Shah, drawing parallels between him and the Umayyad Caliph Yazid I, the perpetrator of the Karbala tragedy who killed Husayn ibn Ali—tantamount to declaring him an archenemy in Shia Islam.

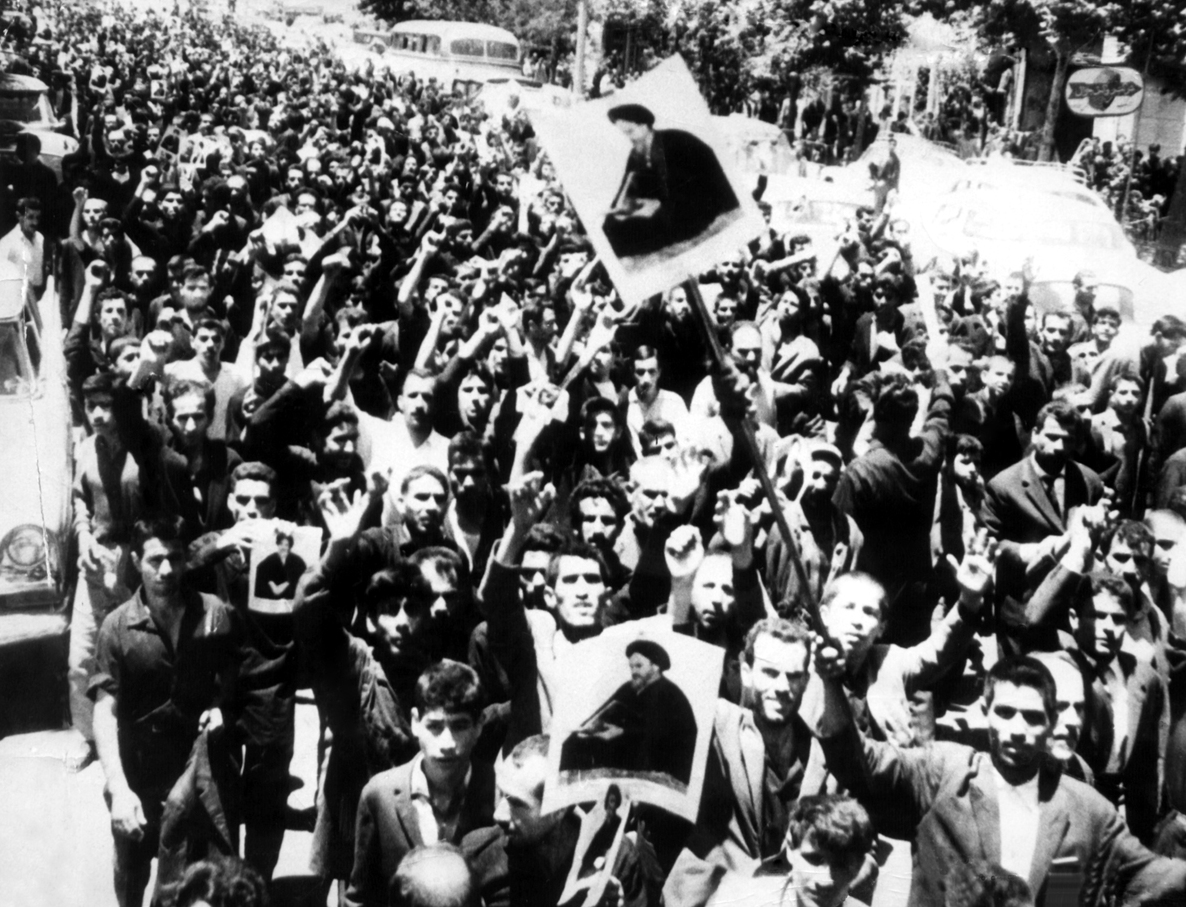
15 Khordad protests

- June 5, 1963: Prime Minister Asadollah Alam orders the arrest of Khomeini, sparking the 15 Khordad protests led by the Islamic Coalition Party and the Freedom Movement. Martial law is declared and hundreds are killed; After nineteen days in the Qasr prison, Ayatollah Khomeini was moved first to the 'Eshratabad' military base and then to a house in the 'Davoudiyeh' section of Tehran where he is kept under surveillance. after 19 days in prison, Khomeini is placed under house arrest. SAVAK chief Hassan Pakravan communicates with senior religious leaders, fearing a popular uprising if Khomeini is executed.

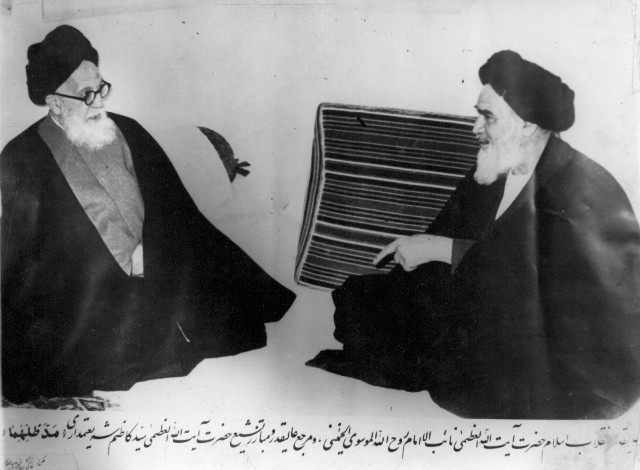
Shariatmadari (left), who saved the life of Khomeini (right)

- July 1963: Senior religious figures, including Grand Ayatollah Kazem Shariatmadari, elevate Khomeini to the rank of Grand Ayatollah to protect him from execution.
- Autumn 1963: Hosseiniyeh Ershad is established under the leadership of Nasser Minachi, commencing lectures before the completion of the building construction.
- April 7, 1964: Khomeini is released from house arrest and returns from Tehran to Qom.
- June 1964: Mahmoud Taleghani is sentenced to 10 years in prison for leading the 15 Khordad protests. While in prison, he preaches the Quran to inmates, debates with leftist prisoners, and completes the final (fourth) edition of Islam and Ownership.

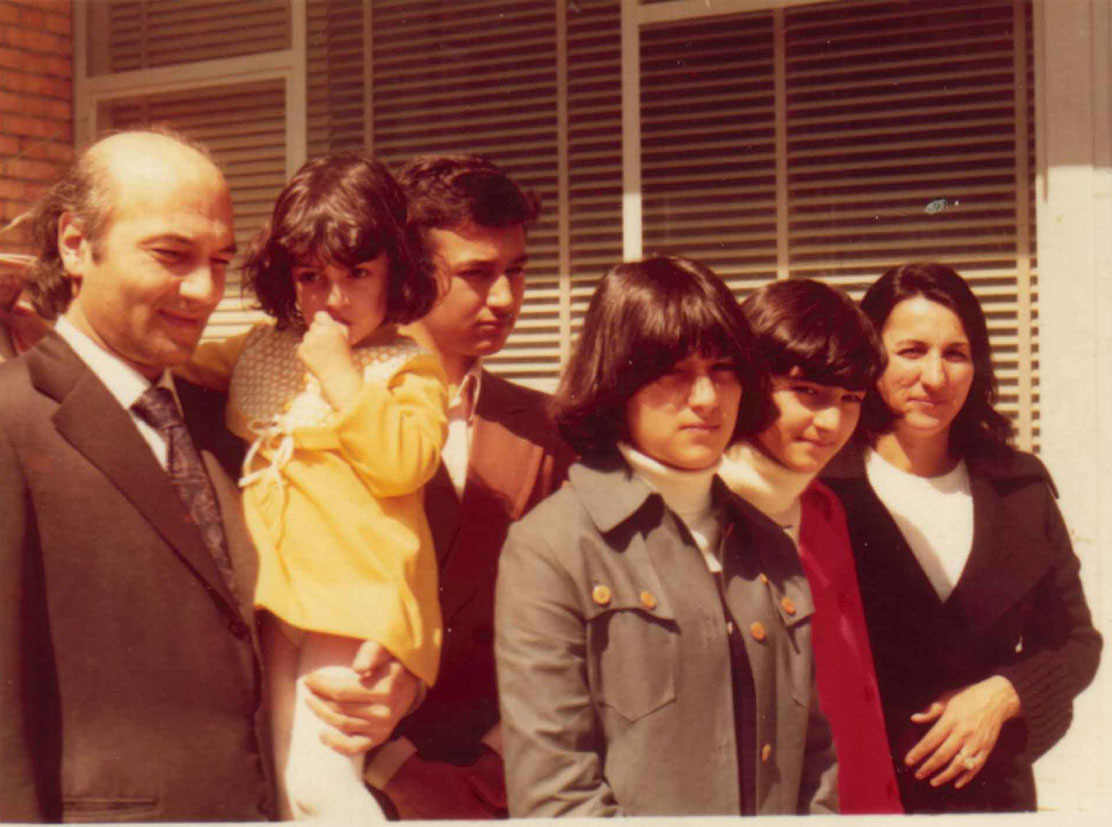
Shariati released from prison, greeted by his family

- June 1964: Ali Shariati returns to Iran after completing his doctorate at the Sorbonne University in France. He is arrested immediately upon arrival, imprisoned for several months, and released in early 1965.

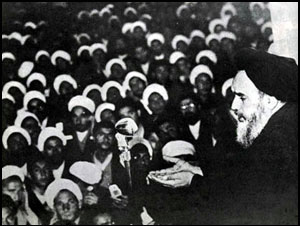
Khomeini denounces the capitulations.

- October 26 1964: Khomeini denounces "capitulations" (the government's underhanded extending of diplomatic immunity to American military personnel), and calls the agreement as surrender of Iranian independence and sovereignty, made in exchange for a $200 million loan that would be of benefit only to the Shah and his associates, and describes all those in the Majlis who voted in favor of it as traitors, concluding that the government is illegitimate.
- November 4, 1964: Khomeini is exiled to Turkey via Mehrabad International Airport, beginning his 15-year period of exile.
- January 22, 1965: Hassan-Ali Mansur, the prime minister, who passed the Geneva Convention American Force Protection Act, also known as the "Capitulation Law", is assassinated by Mohammad Bokharaii, and Amir Abbas Hoveyda is appointed in his stead.
- 1965: Shariatmadari establishes Dar al-Tabligh, an Islamic modernist seminary.
- September 5 1965: Considering the Freedom Movement too moderate and ineffective, Tehran University students including Mohammad Hanifnejad and Ali Asghar Badiazadegan found the People's Mujahedin of Iran (MEK), an Islamic socialist political faction. On the same day, Khomeini leaves Turkey for Najaf in Iraq, where he was destined to spend 13 years. He teaches in seminary during this time.
- November 1966: Shariati is appointed as an assistant professor in the Department of History at Mashhad University. He begins lecturing the following year, creating a phenomenon among students with an innovative perspective combining Marxism, existentialism, and Shia Islamism, with his ideas being strongly embraced by the MEK; Meanwhile, Ebrahim Yazdi joins Khomeini's inner circle in Najaf and devises his influential cassette tape strategy.
- 1967–1969: Ali Khamenei, a pupil of Khomeini, and his brother Mohammad Khamenei translate the works of Sayyid Qutb into Persian and distributes them.
- March 5, 1967: Mossaddegh dies under house arrest at the age of 84.
- June 2, 1967: The Shah visits West Berlin. Protests by German students turn into riots following a violent police crackdown, during which Benno Ohnesorg is killed.
- October 26, 1967: Mohammad Reza Pahlavi holds his coronation ceremony, officially crowning himself as Shahanshah (King of Kings, Emperor).
- November 1967: Shariati is invited as a lecturer at Hosseiniyeh Ershad in Tehran, traveling between Mashhad and Tehran to deliver lectures.
- December 1967: Construction of the Hosseiniye Ershad building is completed.
- January 1969: Abolhassan Banisadr translates Frantz Fanon's The Wretched of the Earth into Persian, which is published anonymously through Mossadegh Press.

=== 1970s ===
- 1970: The United States becomes a net oil importer, enabling OPEC to establish its international presence for the first time and laying the groundwork for Iran's rapid economic expansion during the 1970s.
- January 21–February 8, 1970: Khomeini gives a series of nineteen lectures to a group of his Talaba (students) on Islamic Government while he was in exile in Iraq in the holy city of Najaf. Notes of the lectures were soon made into a book that appeared under three different titles: The Islamic Government, Authority of the Jurist, and A Letter from Imam Musavi Kashef al-Qita (to deceive Iranian censors). The small book (fewer than 150 pages) was smuggled into Iran and "widely distributed" to Khomeini supporters before the revolution.
- February 21, 1970: Following the Tehran municipal government's announcement of a threefold increase in bus fares, university students launch protest demonstrations that escalate into three days of rioting as citizens join, ultimately forcing the government to rescind the fare hike.
- Late January 1971: Mostafa Chamran resigns from the NASA Jet Propulsion Laboratory and leaves for Lebanon, joining Musa al-Sadr's Amal Movement.
- February 8, 1971: Siahkal incident. The People's Fedai Guerrillas attack a police station, killing three police officers and freeing detainees. The perpetrators are subsequently tracked down, arrested, and executed by the police and SAVAK. This incident demonstrates the viability of clandestine left-wing urban guerrilla in Iran, despite intensified surveillance, mirroring contemporary movements in Italy, West Germany, and Northern Ireland.
- February 14, 1971: Spearheaded by the Shah, OPEC and 24 Western oil companies sign the Tehran Price Agreement.
- June 1971: Under government pressure, Shariati is dismissed from Mashhad University. Leaving his upbringing town of Mashhad for Tehran, he sharpens his ideological focus at Hosseiniyeh Ershad, delivering major lectures such as Red Shi'ism vs. Black Shi'ism in the latter half of 1971 and He became a star lecturer whose an audience of thousands packs the main auditorium.
- August 1971: the MEK plotted a sabotage on Tehran's power grid and the hijacking of the Shah's private jet to disrupt the 2,500-year celebration of the Persian Empire.
- August 23, 1971: Key leaders and founders of the MEK are arrested by SAVAK.
- October 1971: The 2,500-year celebration of the Persian Empire was held. Registered in the Guinness World Records as the most lavish banquet in history, the event draws widespread domestic and international derision, while Khomeini denounces it as the "Devil's festival."
- November 29, 1971: Iranian forces launch a surprise occupation of the Greater and Lesser Tunbs. This maneuver establishes Iran's naval dominance over the Strait of Hormuz, a strategic status quo that persists to this day.
- November 30, 1971: The MEK attempted to kidnap Douglas MacArthur II, the U.S. Ambassador to Iran and nephew of General Douglas MacArthur, to use as a hostage to free imprisoned comrades, but the attempt failed.
- April 19, 1972: Minister of the Court Asadollah Alam advises the Shah to preemptively implement democratic reform "before transformation is forced upon us," but his advice is ignored.
- May 25, 1972: Central Committee members of the MEK — Ali Asghar Badiazadegan, Saeed Mohsen, Mohammad Hanifnejad, Abdol Rasul Meshkinfam, and Mahmoud Asgarizadeh — were executed by firing squad. With the exception of Massoud Rajavi, whose sentence was commuted in April, the initial Central Committee of the MEK was completely decimated.
- May 30, 1972: Richard Nixon pays a state visit to Iran on his return journey from signing the Anti-Ballistic Missile Treaty with the Leonid Brezhnev, marking the first visit by a U.S. president to the country in 13 years; Nixon grants the Shah a "blank check" for purchasing American weaponry.
- May 31, 1972: At least three bombs targeted at Nixon and the U.S. Military Assistance Advisory Group in Iran (ARMISH-MAAG) detonated in a series of explosions in Tehran, carried out by the MEK.
- August 13, 1972: The MEK assassinates Brigadier General Saeed Taheri, the chief of the Tehran police.
- Late September 1972: The MEK attempted to kidnap Shahram Pahlavinia, the nephew of the Shah, but the attempt failed.
- November 1972: The government forces the closure of Hosseiniyeh Ershad and bans works by Shariati.
- January 23, 1973: During an the anniversary of the White Revolution, the Shah warns the Western oil consortium that its agreement will not be renewed, followed days later by a declaration establishing the National Iranian Oil Company’s exclusive ownership of all oil industry assets.
- June 2, 1973: Vahid Afrakhteh of the MEK assassinates U.S. Army Lieutenant Colonel Lewis Lee Hawkins.
- June 15, 1973: Reza Rezaei, a member of the MEK Central Committee, commits suicide during a gunfight with SAVAK.
- Mid-1973: Internal schism erupts within the MEK. While leadership remains imprisoned, outside operatives split into a faction loyal to Islamic socialism and a faction converting to Soviet-style Marxism-Leninism.
- September 1973: After ten months in hiding, Shariati surrenders and is arrested by SAVAK after they take his father hostage.
- October 1973: First oil crisis. OPEC member states hold an emergency meeting in Kuwait and drive oil prices above five dollars per barrel within 72 hours.
- 1974: As Iran is not an Arab state, it does not join the oil embargo against the West, but profits immensely from the windfall, leading the country's oil boom to peak in 1974. Skyscrapers emerge across major cities, and the Iranian armed forces expand to become the fifth largest in the world, while the wealth gap and urban-rural disparity begin to widen uncontrollably.
- May 1, 1974: The Shah is diagnosed with chronic lymphocytic leukemia. The fact that the Shah is a cancer patient is kept strictly confidential until the outbreak of the revolution in 1978.
- September, 1974: The 7th Asian Games open in Tehran.
- 1975: The urban-rural income gap reaches a ratio of seven-to-one, and housing costs in Tehran consume up to 75% of average incomes. A massive underclass of impoverished male migrants from rural areas forms slums on the outskirts of major cities like Tehran and Tabriz, establishing a critical support base for Khomeini.
- January 1, 1975: Amnesty International releases its 1974–75 annual report, estimating the number of political prisoners in Iran to be between 25,000 and 100,000.
- January 27, 1975: The Church Committee is established under the U.S. Senate to investigate illegal operations by the CIA and other intelligence agencies.
- March 2, 1975: The Shah consolidates and dissolves existing pro-government parties—the Iran Novin Party, the Mardom Party, the Pan-Iranist Party, and the Iranians' Party—to form the monarchist Rastakhiz (Resurrection) Party.
- March 6, 1975: Algiers Agreement. The Shah and Iraq's Saddam Hussein reach an accord to settle their border disputes. Following the agreement, the Shah and the CIA abruptly withdraw their support for the Iraqi Kurds, leaving thousands to be massacred by the Hussein regime. This event marks the beginning of a recurring historical pattern of U.S. utilization and subsequent abandonment of the Kurdish people.
- March 20, 1975: Imprisoned in Evin Prison, Shariati is released under domestic and international pressure and placed under house arrest. SAVAK pieces together his incomplete manuscripts to publish a fabricated series titled Man, Islam, and Marxism in the state-run daily Kayhan, falsely presenting him as having defected to the royalist.
- May 1975: Schism within the MEK leads to bloodshed including the assassination of Majid Sharif-Vaghefi; the Leninist faction, led by Taghi Shahram and Bahram Aram, eventually breaks away to form Peykar (the Marxist Mujahedin).
- May 21, 1975: Vahid Afrakhteh of Peykar assassinates U.S. Air Force Colonel Paul R. Shaffer.
- June 1975: Anniversary of the uprising of 15 Khordad. Students at the Feyziyeh madreseh hold a demonstration within the confines of the building, and a sympathetic crowd assembles outside. Both gatherings continues for three days until they are attacked by military forces, resulting in some casualties. Khomeini reacts with a message in which he declares the events in Qom and similar disturbances elsewhere to be a sign of hope that "freedom and liberation from the bonds of imperialism" is at hand.
- December 15, 1975: A ceremony marking the 50th anniversary of the establishment of the Pahlavi dynasty is held at the mausoleum of Reza Shah Pahlavi. Tens of thousands of citizens from all walks of life are mobilized for the event, but their public sentiment is so cold that even the Shahbanu (Queen) notices it.
- April 7, 1976: Grand Ayatollah Abol-Hassan Shams-Abadi is mysteriously assassinated in Isfahan. Shamsabadi was a traditionalist who opposed the Shah's Westernizing reforms but disagreed with Khomeinism. The Shah's regime blames and arrests Khomeinist Mehdi Hashemi for the murder, but conspiracy theories attributing the murder to the SAVAK circulates.
- April 26, 1976: The Church Committee publishes its final investigative report, officially exposing that the CIA was behind the overthrow of Mossaddegh in 1953.
- August 28, 1976: Peykar assassinates three Rockwell International employees in Tehran.
- Autumn 1976: Imprisoned in Evin Prison, MEK leader Massoud Rajavi drafted and smuggled out a 12-point declaration condemning Peykar's internal coup and reaffirming the organizational legitimacy of the MEK.
- December 15, 1976: The 48th OPEC Ministerial Conference is held in Doha, Qatar. Iran demands a 15% increase in oil prices, whereas Saudi Arabia, acting in prior coordination with the Gerald Ford administration, advocates for a 5% increase.
- January 1977: Iran's oil export revenues plunge due to two-tier oil pricing, with production decreasing by 38% compared to the previous month. As public finances deplete, the government shifts to an austerity budget, rendering hundreds of thousands of workers employed in state development projects unemployed. The convergence of skyrocketing inflation and soaring unemployment severely degrades living standards, precipitating the collapse of middle-class asset values while the privileged elite begin shifting private capital abroad.
- May 15, 1977: Despite being banned from leaving the country, Shariati evades authorities by omitting "Shariati" from his full name "Ali Shariati Mazinani" and using a passport under "Ali Mazinani" to successfully escape to Brussels, Belgium.
- June 1977: Morteza Motahhari publishes "Materialism in Iran", warning that the MEK and the Forqan Group are communists under the guise of Islamists, describing them as pseudo-Islamic.
- June 18, 1977: Ali Shariati dies under suspicious circumstances while in exile in Southampton, United Kingdom.
- August 1977: The Shah's close confidant, Asadollah Alam, resigns due to leukemia and unsuccessfully advises the Shah for arms reduction.

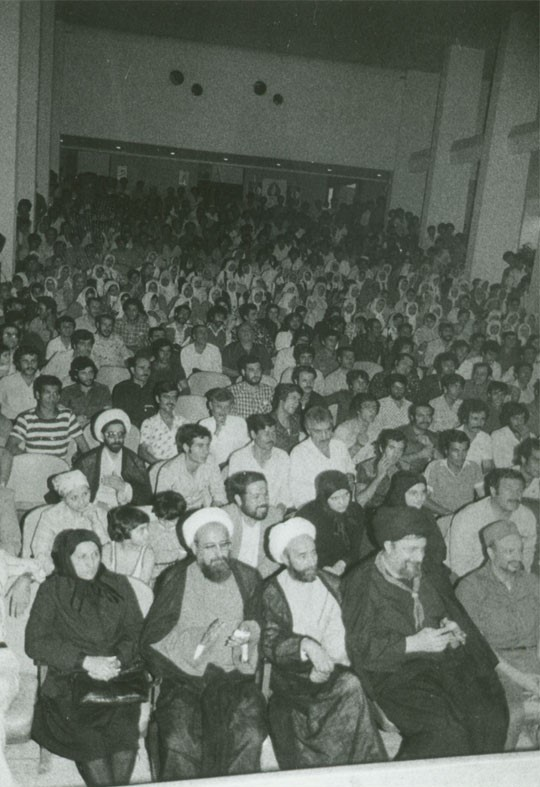
Arbaeen (40th-day after death) for Shariati held in Beirut, Lebanon

- October 23 1977: Mostafa Khomeini, the son of Ayatollah Khomeini, died while the family lived in Najaf. His death led to unfounded rumors of foul play by Shah's regime and became the subject of a "martyrdom" by opponents of Shah's government, and would fuel the growing discontent with the Shah that eventually led to the Iranian Revolution.
- October 30, 1977: Hassan Rouhani uses the title "Imam" to refer to Khomeini for the first time during a memorial service for Mostafa Khomeini held at the Ark Mosque in Tehran.
- November 6, 1977: Morteza Motahhari, Mohammad Beheshti, Ali Khamenei, and others found the Combatant Clergy Association.
- November 15, 1977: The Shah makes a visit to the United States and meets with Jimmy Carter on the White House lawn. Thousands of Iranian students protest around the White House. Tear gas fired by the U.S. police drifts into the White House lawn, causing chaos during the ceremony. Clashes erupt between Iranian student protesters and pro-Shah counter-demonstrators, injuring over 100 people, including 29 U.S. police officers. Although Carter treats the Shah cordially, the chaotic ceremony is broadcast live on television, fostering a widespread misconception within Iran that the new U.S. president might abandon the Shah.
- December 31, 1977: Carter visits Tehran and delivers his infamous "island of stability" speech. During a dinner banquet at the Niavaran Palace, he praises the Shah, describing Iran as the only stable country in a turbulent Middle East.

== Revolution ==
=== 1978 ===
- January 7: An infamous article titled "Iran and Red and Black Colonization" is published in the Ettela'at newspaper. The piece levels various absurd accusations against Khomeini, including homosexuality and collusion with the British. Information and Tourism Minister Daryoush Homayoun later claimed that the article was published under the Shah's order. Rage began to spread like wildfire throughout the religious community. Through this strategic blunder by the regime, Khomeini, who had been largely forgotten within Iran by that time, regained immediate nationwide prominence.
- January 9: Demonstration of 4,000 students and religious leaders in the city of Qom against the article. The armed police was provoked by the angry demonstrators which resulted in death of between 10 and 72 demonstrators. Protests credited with breaking the "barrier of fear" of security forces "at the popular level".
- January 16: William H. Sullivan, the U.S. Ambassador to Iran, reports to Washington D.C. that "the level of violence is by no means a critical threat to the Iranian government."
- January 25: A state-sponsored demonstration marking the 15th anniversary of the White Revolution is staged, with 300,000 people participating in the pro-government rally in Tehran alone.
- February 18: Arbayeen (i.e. 40th day observance) of Qom's fallen protesters. Groups in a number of cities marched to honour the fallen and protest against the rule of the Shah. This time, violence erupted in Tabriz. According to some reports approximately 100 demonstrators are killed.
- February 23: Michael Metrinko, the U.S. Consul in Tabriz who narrowly escaped the violence, warns that "religious social forces long ignored by Tehran have grown strong enough to threaten regime control in the provinces and cannot be easily placated." However, the U.S. Embassy in Tehran dismisses his warning, sending the report to Washington D.C. via diplomatic pouch rather than an emergency cable. Despite being the largest CIA station in West Asia, CIA Tehran branch fails to detect the growing unrest in Iran due to its primary focus on monitoring the Soviet Union.
- March 29: Arbayeen of Tabriz's fallen protesters by demonstrations in various cities. Demonstrators are killed by police in Yazd.
- May 10: Arbayeen of Yazd's fallen protesters. Demonstrations in various cities. In Qom, commandos "burst into" the home of Ayatollah Kazem Shariatmadari, a leading cleric and quietist, and shoot dead one of his followers right in front of him. Shariatmadari then joins opposition to the Shah.
- Mid-May: Minister of the Court Amir-Abbas Hoveyda contacts Shariatmadari, promising punishment for those responsible and appealing for assistance to prevent anticipated bloodshed on June 5. Shariatmadari conditions his cooperation on the restoration of the 1906 Constitution.
- June 5: The 15th anniversary of the 15 Khordad uprising passes without bloodshed, owing to the efforts of moderate clerics such as Shariatmadari. Meanwhile, at the U.S. Embassy in Tehran, the newly appointed Deputy Chief of Mission Charles Naas convenes a plenary meeting of U.S. diplomats in Iran. Provincial consular officials report an ominous trend, noting a sharp surge in U.S. visa applications from minority groups, including Christians, Baháʼís, and Balochis. The minutes of this meeting take a month to reach Washington D.C.
- June 6: Head of SAVAK, Nematollah Nassiri, dismissed and Nasser Moghadam is appointed instead. "First significant concession to the unrest."
- June 20: 40th day cycle of marking demonstration deaths passes with little violence, thanks to calls by Shariatmadari's for observance in mosques not on the streets. Inflation subsiding. Regime's "carrot and stick" and anti-inflation measures seem to be working.
- Mid-to-Late July: Ayatollah Musa al-Sadr signals his willingness to act as a mediator through a SAVAK agent stationed in Lebanon. As the Shah accepts his proposal, a meeting is scheduled for September 7 in West Germany between al-Sadr and the Shah's envoy.
- July 21: Ayatollah Ahmad Kafi dies in a car accident in Mashhad. Rumors spread widely that he was assassinated by SAVAK, sparking violent clashes that leave 9 police officers and approximately 40 protesters dead.
- August 5: On Constitutional Day, the Shah delivers a televised address promising free elections by June 1979. Shariatmadari dispatches a secret envoy to the Shah to convey his endorsement for the decision. Meanwhile, street violence begins to escalate again as Ramadan commences.
- August 11: A demonstration involving thousands of people erupts in Isfahan, resulting in casualties. Martial law is declared for the first time since 1963.
- Mid-August: Khomeini sends a message to Shariatmadari demanding that he stop discussing democracy and the constitution. Shariatmadari returns a cold response, telling Khomeini to return to Tehran so they can discuss the matter in person.
- August 15: Shariatmadari negotiates with SAVAK chief Nasser Moghaddam, stating that if the Shah makes concessions for constitutional democracy, he is willing, along with other Grand Ayatollahs, to issue a fatwa declaring, "Stop the killing among Muslim brothers."
- August 17: Vacationing and putting aside Shariatmadari's ultimatum, the Shah holds a press conference denouncing the "Islamic Marxists" behind the national turmoil, and threatens that safety cannot be guaranteed for those taking to the streets in protest.

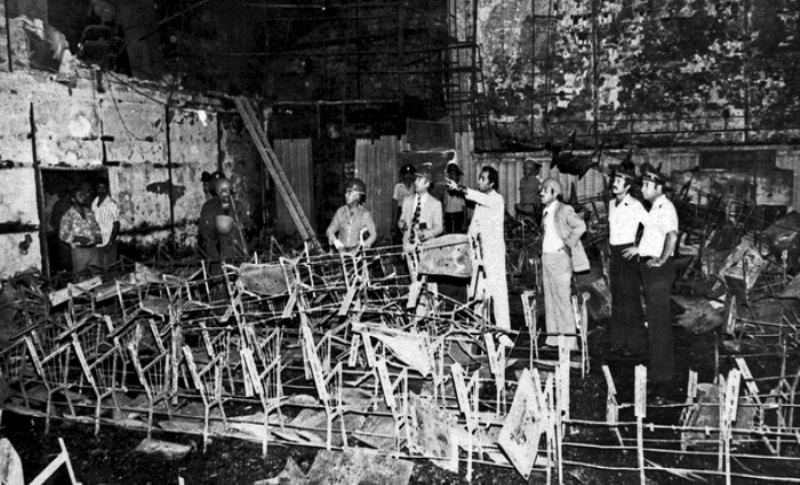
The remains of the completely destroyed Cinema Rex after the arson

- August 19: the 25th anniversary of Mossaddegh's ousting; the Cinema Rex fire occurs in Abadan. Islamic fundamentalist Hossein Takbalizadeh sets fire to the cinema during a screening of the film The Deer, which criticized police violence. 477 die in arson fire. Regime and opposition blame each other. While other conservative Ayatollahs who had previously encouraged attacks on cinemas condemn this act as heinous, Khomeini remains silent.
- August 20: The Queen Mother persists with the annual garden party at the Sa'dabad complex, traditionally held to mark the anniversary of Mossaddegh's ousting. As the royal family hosts the party while the bodies of the Cinema Rex victims have yet to be recovered, the Iranian public and political establishment are left in deep shock. Regardless of who was behind the arson, public fury escalates as the failure to rescue victims and the disconnected hydrants are attributed to the incompetence and corruption of the Shah's regime. Shahbanu Farah Pahlavi proposes visit to Abadan, but Prime Minister Jamshid Amouzegar dissuades her, citing inability to guarantee her safety.
- August 22: Khomeini finally breaks his silence, asserting that the Cinema Rex fire was the work of the Shah's henchmen.
- August 23: Karim Sanjabi, leader of the reconstituted National Front, states during a press conference that the Cinema Rex fire reminds him "the Reichstag fire."
- August 27: Prime Minister Jamshid Amouzegar is ousted and replaced by Jafar Sharif-Emami. In a policy shift, Sharif-Emami repeals some of the Shah's prior reforms, pledging to shut down casinos, abolish the imperial calendar and the Ministry of Women's Affairs, and dismiss non-Muslim ministers from the cabinet. However, the public reaction remains tepid and skeptical, as Sharif-Emami himself had served as the head of the Pahlavi Foundation — the institution managing the Shah's private slush funds — and was widely perceived as a central figure in state corruption.
- August 31: Ayatollah Musa al-Sadr disappears in Libya; the circumstances surrounding his disappearance remain a mystery to this day.
- Early September: Shariatmadari demands Sharif-Emami to dismiss Baháʼís from high-ranking government positions and allow unrestricted Eid al-Fitr marches. Sharif-Emami responds that military and police forces will not interfere as long as the demonstrations remain nonviolent.
- September 4: Mass march at Eid al-Fitr, millions of people march peacefully across the nation, with 500,000 participating in Tehran alone. Marchers embrace and offer flowers to the military and police forces stationed along the streets. Secular dissident factions begin to envision a coalition with moderate clerics like Shariatmadari. The Shah realizes that the populace is not being manipulated by an external instigator but genuinely harbors hostility toward him, and recognizes the possibility that soldiers could defect to join the protesters.
- September 5: The marches continue.
- September 6: The military establishment urges the Shah to declare martial law. Taking political responsibility, Sharif-Emami announces that all future street marches will require government authorization.
- September 7: Crowds defy Sharif-Emami's announcement and continue marching. That night, the Shah officially declares martial law.

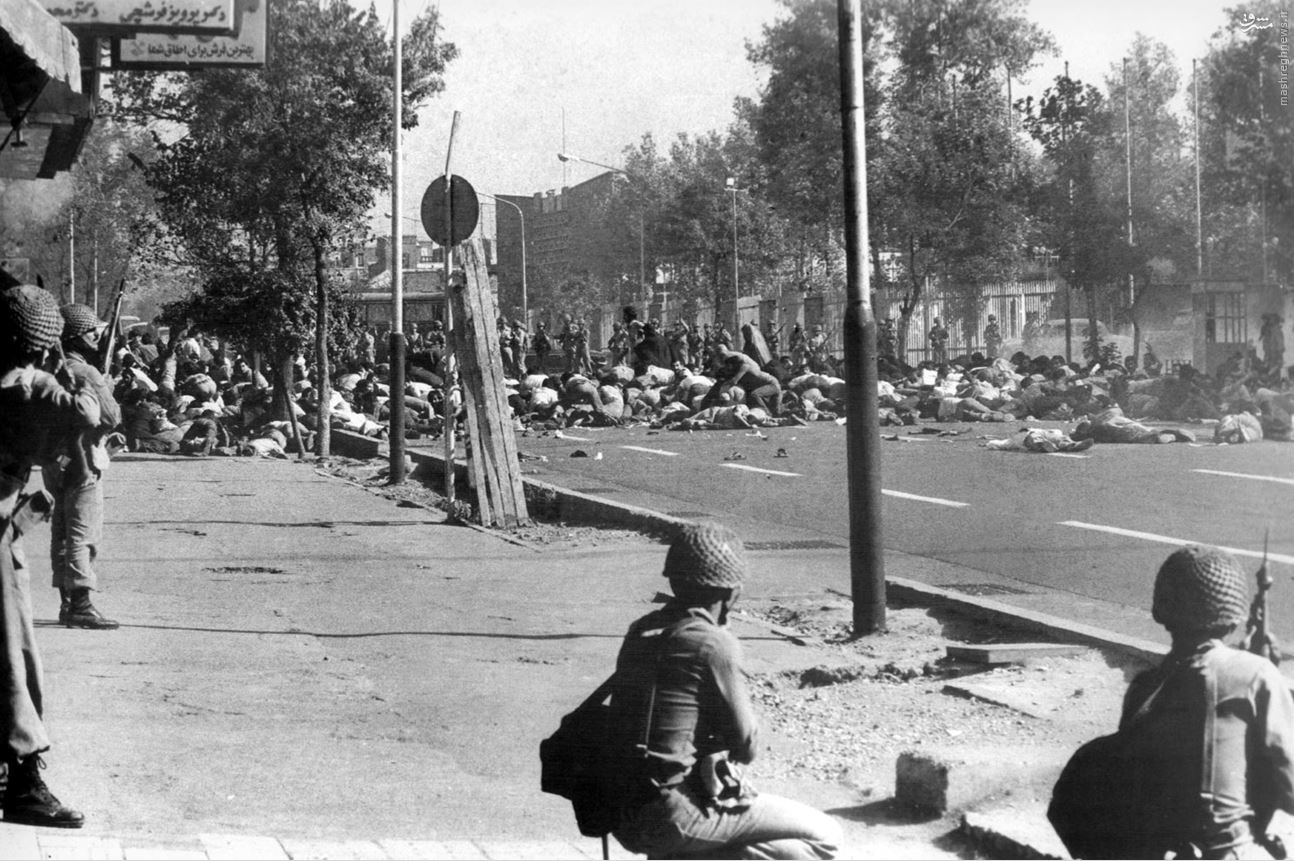
Black Friday in Tehran, September 8, 1978

- September 8: At 6:00 a.m., martial law is broadcast nationwide. At 9:00 a.m., protesters in Tehran's Jaleh Square defy the military's order to disperse. Utilizing tanks and helicopters, the military violently suppresses the demonstration, an event known as "Black Friday". At least 88 people (including three women) are killed, with total fatalities estimated between 200 and 300, while opposition leaders inflate the casualty figure into the "tens of thousands".
- September 10: the Shah summoned U.S. Ambassador William H. Sullivan to urgently appeal for President Carter's support The Shah places a hotline call to Carter at Camp David, but Carter, preoccupied with mediating the peace agreement between Egypt's Anwar Sadat and Israel's Menachem Begin, listens to the Shah half-heartedly. Panicked, the Shah publicly announces that Carter has granted him full support, which instead only serves to fuel anti-American sentiment among the people.
- September 13: Musa al-Sadr's sister calls Grand Ayatollah Kazem Shariatmadari, appealing for assistance in locating the missing Musa. Shariatmadari was a mentor to Sayyid Reza al-Sadr, Musa's older brother.
- September 16: The catastrophic Tabas earthquake, measuring 7.4 on the Richter scale, strikes the region, leaving more than 16,000 people buried alive.
- September 16–24: Michel Foucault visits Iran as a correspondent for Corriere della Sera.
- September 18: Taking a lesson from the Cinema Rex fire, the Shahbanu visits Tabas two days after the disaster, but receives a cold reception; Meanwhile, a conspiracy theory spreads that the earthquake was artificially triggered by a U.S. underground nuclear test.
- Mid-September: Richard Cottam attempts to arrange a meeting between Ebrahim Yazdi, then a professor at Baylor College of Medicine, and Gary Sick, a staff member of the White House National Security Council. However, after the proposal is flatly rejected, Yazdi becomes convinced that the United States has no intention of supporting the Iranian oppositions.
- September 24: Iraqi government embargoes the house of Khomeini in Najaf and bans his political activities.
- September 25 (3rd of Mehr): Rastakhiz party is disbanded.
- October 3: Ebrahim Yazdi joins Khomeini in Najaf. Khomeini leaves Iraq for Kuwait after being pressured by Iran's neighbor Iraq to "tone down his anti-compromise rhetoric". He is refused entry at the Kuwait border.
- October 5: Yazdi proposes that Khomeini travel to France, which allows visa-free entry, to utilize the Western free press. Although Khomeini is reluctant to relocate to a non-Muslim nation, Yazdi manages to persuade him.
- October 6: Khomeini embarks for Paris.

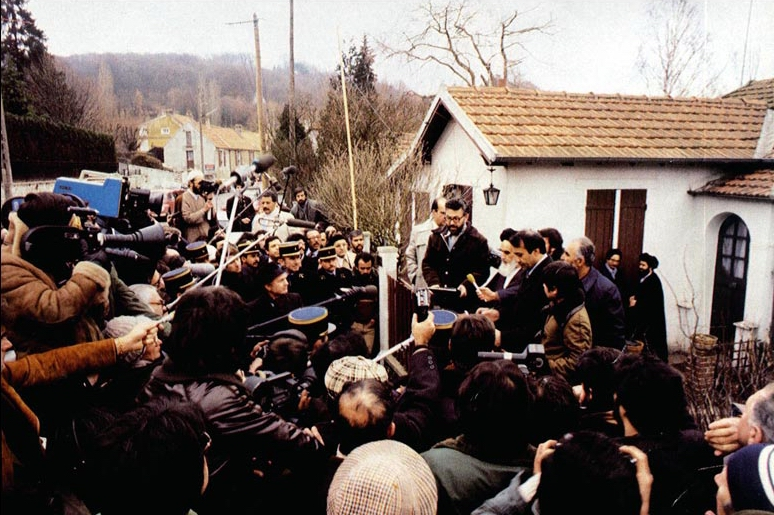
Khomeini surrounded by international journalists at his residence in Neauphle-le-Château, January 1979

- October 10: Khomeini settles into a residence in the suburb of Neauphle-le-Château with the assistance of exiled Iranians, including Abolhassan Banisadr, Sadegh Ghotbzadeh, and Ebrahim Yazdi — three technocrats dubbed Khomeini's "three viziers," all of whom would later be discarded by the cleric regime; On the same day, Henry Precht presents at the Anglo-American Foreign Policy Planning Talks in Washington, D.C., warning that Iran is facing a worst-case foreign policy disaster and that the Shah's survival cannot be guaranteed. however, his assessment is dismissed as nonsense by senior British and American officials.
- October: Over the following months, Khomeini enjoys widespread media attention from journalists across the world who come to France to interview him, and being revered by Western intellectuals as "Iran's Gandhi"; Yazdi takes charge of translating Khomeini's remarks, tailoring them to appeal to Western sensibilities, while dismisses questions regarding Khomeini's Islamic Government by claiming it is a SAVAK forgery.
- mid-October: Air Force pilots submit their resignations, stating they can no longer remain loyal to the Shah. Although Tabriz Consul Metrinko reports this to the Tehran embassy, he is instead reprimanded by Ambassador Sullivan.
- October 11: Strike of Newspapers
- October 16: Arbayeen of protesters killed on "Black Friday". Some people were killed in the main mosque of Kerman. "A rapid succession of strikes cripple almost all the bazaars, universities, high schools, oil installations, banks, government ministries, post offices, railways, newspapers, customs and post facilities," etc. and "seal the Shah's fate."
- October 21: Iran Oil industry workers go on strike.
- October 24: A close associate of Sharif-Emami informs the U.S. Embassy that Grand Ayatollah Shariatmadari and Mehdi Bazargan of the Freedom Movement have reached a 12-point agreement with the Sharif-Emami cabinet.
- October 25: In an attempt to appease public anger, a mass amnesty for political prisoners is granted on the Shah's birthday, releasing over 1,000 inmates including Mohammad-Ali Amoui, Abbas Hazari, Taghi Keymanesh, and Ezzatollah Sahabi.

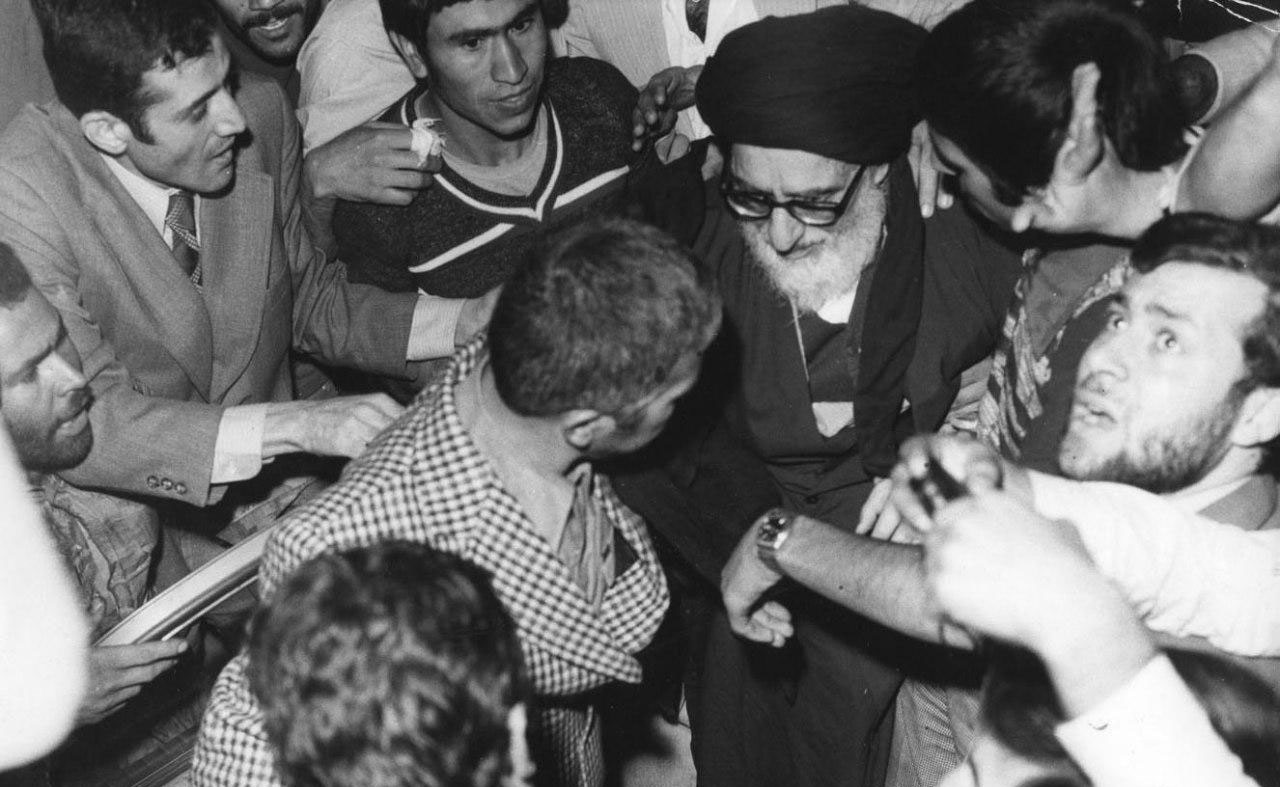
The people welcoming Taleghani, the ‘Soul of the Revolution’

- October 27: Additional political prisoners are released, including Ayatollah Mahmoud Taleghani and Ayatollah Hossein-Ali Montazeri; Sharif-Emami holds a three-hour secret meeting with Shariatmadari, securing a pledge of "quiet support" for the government.
- October: Anti-government clerics, including Sadegh Khalkhali, travel to visit Khomeini in Neauphle-le-Château, their manoeuvre was possible thanks to the visa waiver agreement the Shah had previously signed with France; Mehdi Bazargan visits Khomeini in to deliver the proposed agreement with Sharif-Emami. However, Khomeini rejects any compromise, demanding the total overthrow of the monarchy and the establishment of an Islamic republic.
- Late October: Grand Ayatollah Shariatmadari interviews with The New Yorker, describing Iran as a volcano boiling with rage while expressing his moderate stance favoring a return to the 1906 Constitution—granting religious leaders veto power—over the total abolition of the monarchy. He objects to Western media portraying them as anachronistic reactionaries, clarifying that they reject moral decay from rapid Westernization rather than science, medicine, or technology. The interview is published in December 1978.
- October 29: Bazargan accepts Khomeini's proposal and agrees to pursue the revolution. Following Bazargan's alignment, Shariatmadari abandons his compromise with the government and declares "solidarity with Khomeini" during an interview with AFP.
- November 1: The National Front demands a national referendum on the continuation of the monarchy. The Shah reacts with fury and rejects the demand.
- November 2: Zbigniew Brzezinski convenes a National Security Council meeting in the White House Situation Room, marking the first time the senior U.S. leadership recognizes the critical situation in Iran.
- November 4: Following two days of mass demonstrations, military and police forces open fire on students protesting within the campus of Tehran University, killing one of them. The protests escalate into uncontrollable rioting, resulting in the arson of thousands of shops and restaurants.
- November 5: The British Embassy is engulfed in flames. As compromises with moderate oppositions like Bazargan and Shariatmadari collapse, the Shah plans the establishment of a military government. He dismisses Prime Minister Sharif-Emami, who had led the compromise efforts, and appoints General Gholam Reza Azhari, the Chief of Staff of the Army, as the new Prime Minister.
- November 6: The Shah delivers a televised address, "I heard the voice of your revolution... As Shah of Iran as well as an Iranian citizen, I cannot but approve your revolution." While the Shah intends to placate the protesters by using the military government to extrajudicially eradicate corrupt elements, his explicit recognition of the situation as a "revolution" serves only to embolden the demonstrators.
- November 8: The Shah orders the arrest of eight prominent figures — including Nematollah Nassiri, Hassan Pakravan, Abdol Azim Valian, Amir-Abbas Hoveyda, and Daryoush Homayoun – to serve as scapegoats for the regime's failures; On the same day, Khomeini states in a United Press interview: "I have repeatedly said that neither my desire nor my age nor my position allows me to govern."
- November 9: U.S. Ambassador William H. Sullivan dispatches a secret memorandum to Washington D.C. titled "Thinking the Unthinkable." Contemplating the potential downfall of the Shah's regime, he argues that Khomeini could return to Iran to assume a "Gandhi-like role" without direct political power, and it might not be disadvantageous to the United States. Having advocated for the preservation of the Shah's regime and the "quarantine" of Khomeini until just two weeks prior, Sullivan's sudden reversal causes foreign affair bureaucrats in Washington to lose trust in him. In particular, National Security Advisor Zbigniew Brzezinski bypasses Sullivan as falling into "defeatism," instead embracing the Shah's conspiracy theory of Communist-Islamist alliance ("Red and Black") and begins to plot a pro-American military coup.
- November 9–15: Michel Foucault visits Iran for a second time as a correspondent for Corriere della Sera.
- November 11: National Front leaders Karim Sanjabi and Dariush Forouhar are arrested while preparing for a press conference denouncing the Shah at Sanjabi's residence.
- November 12: Khomeini calls for a nationwide general strike, but the initiative fails due to strict enforcement and control by the military government.
- November 16: Khomeini states in The Guardian interview: "I don't want to have the power of the government in my hand. I am not interested in personal power."
- November 19: An additional 210 political prisoners are released.
- November 26: A general strike called by Shariatmadari successfully paralyzes the entire functionality of the nation.
- November 27: A wave of mass hysteria spreads nationwide as millions claim to see Khomeini's face on the surface of the moon; even the communist Tudeh Party accepts the story.
- November 28: Khomeini states in Le Journal interview: "It is the Iranian people who have to select their own capable and trustworthy individuals and give them the responsibilities. However, personally, I can't accept any special role or responsibility."
- Late November–Early December: Fearing potential mass riots during the upcoming Ashura, the government makes covert contact with Shariatmadari through former Prime Minister Ali Amini, reaching an agreement where the religious leadership ensures non-violent protests in exchange for the government permitting assemblies and releasing more political prisoners; Meanwhile, from France, Khomeini incites his followers to directly confront military and police forces, calling for a vanguard of 75 loyalists to wear white shrouds and sacrifice their lives, mirroring the tragic Battle of Karbala.
- December: Mansoor Hekmat founds the Union of Communist Militants (Sahand).
- December 1: Across Iran, individuals come forward volunteering to join the suicide vanguard demanded by Khomeini, causing a severe shortage of white cloth nationwide. In Qom alone, 7,000 individuals volunteer.
- December 2: The month of Muharram begins. Hundreds of thousands, and eventually millions, of demonstrators take to the streets, but through the efforts by Shariatmadari, the marches proceed in a largely peaceful manner.
- December 6: Sanjabi and Forouhar, who were arrested on November 11, are released.
- December 7: The MEK-Leninist faction officializes its name as the Organization of Struggle for the Emancipation of the Working Class (Peykar). Prior to this, this organization had claimed themselves to be the orthodox faction of the MEK. This claim had been naturally rejected by the remaining MEK members, including Massoud Rajavi.
- December 8: The ban on street demonstrations is lifted. Shariatmadari urges his followers to avoid violence.
- December 10 and 11: Tasu'a and Ashura. As many as 17 million people "up and down the country march peacefully demanding the removal of the Shah and return of Khomeini," led by Mahmoud Taleghani of the Freedom Movement and Karim Sanjabi of the National Front. 17-point resolution is presented during the demonstration "declaring the Ayatollah to be the leader of the Iranian people," and calling on Iranians to struggle until the Shah is overthrown.
- December 12: Ebrahim Yazdi travels to Washington, D.C., and appears on the PBS program The MacNeil/Lehrer Report, asserting that the peaceful conclusion of the Ashura marches was due to Khomeinist organizers and claiming that the movement will achieve a peaceful revolution akin to the 1960s American civil rights movement; However, it was the followers of Shariatmadari who managed the marches to restrain violence; That same evening, Henry Precht, the country director for Iran in the U.S. State Department, meets with Yazdi. Precht questions him regarding Khomeini's incitement of the bloodshed in his cassette-tape sermons, but Yazdi denies the allegations.
- Mid-December: Rioters launch a pogrom against the Baháʼí community in Shiraz, setting fire to dozens of houses. Local mullahs deflect blame, claiming it is the false-flag operation of SAVAK agents.
- December 19: Henry Precht reports to his superiors, including Assistant Secretary of State for Near Eastern Affairs Harold H. Saunders and National Security Advisor Zbigniew Brzezinski, that the Shah's regime has at most three months left.
- December 20: Prime Minister Gholam Reza Azhari suffers a heart attack and contacts U.S. Ambassador Sullivan the following day.
- December 23: In Ahvaz, Paul E. Grimm, an executive for an American oil company, is assassinated by unidentified gunmen, triggering a mass exodus of foreigners from Iran.
- December 24: Armed youths attack foreigners in Tehran. A crowd of approximately 300 individuals assaults the main gate of the U.S. Embassy, but is repelled by the embassy's Marine security guard using tear gas.
- December 28: Strikes and severe supply shortages paralyze daily life in Tehran and other major urban centers, exhausting heating oil reserves as midwinter approaches. Richard Cottam meets with Yazdi and Khomeini in France, concluding that Khomeini is "more liberal than expected." Cottam subsequently flies to Tehran to propagate his assessment among other opposition leaders and the U.S. Embassy.
- December 29: Shapour Bakhtiar, a prominent Mossaddeghist and opposition politician, is appointed as the new Prime Minister. Bakhtiar accepts the post with the intention of finding a political middle ground between the Pahlavi dictatorship and a potential Khomeinist dictatorship. He becomes the final Prime Minister of the Pahlavi dynasty, while the Shah concedes control and begins preparations to leave the country.
- December 30: The National Front expels Bakhtiar from the party, branding him a traitor for failing to strip the Shah of his military command. On the same day, thousands of armed rioters launch an assault on the U.S. Consulate in Tabriz.

=== 1979 ===
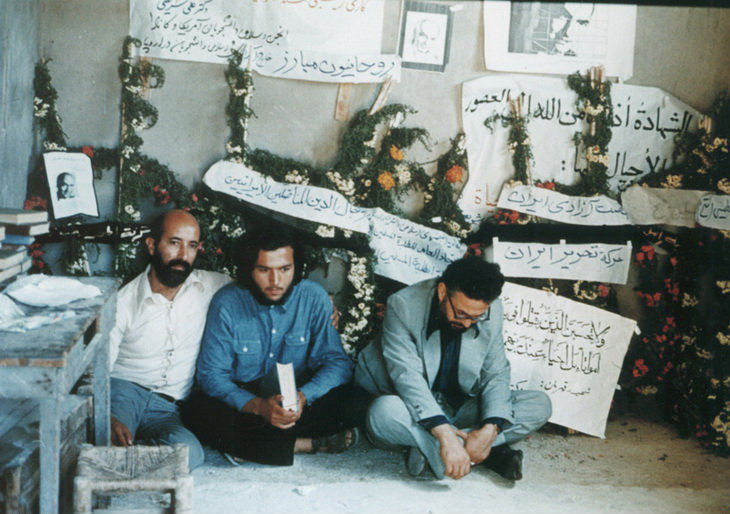
Shariati's revolutionary comrades, Mostafa Chamran and Ebrahim Yazdi, with his son Ehsan Shariati at his grave, 1979

- January 3: Shapour Bakhtiar of the National Front (Jabhe-yi Melli) was appointed prime minister to replace General Azhari.
- January 4: Shapour Bakhtiar approved as the prime minister by Parliament; On the same day, in France, Khomeini meets with American businessman Leonard Freeman, asserting that the new Iranian society he envisions will be built upon humanistic values, a principle through which he feels a shared consensus with the American people. Freeman subsequently delivers a cassette tape containing an audio recording translated by Ebrahim Yazdi to the U.S. Embassy in Paris.
- January 4–7: The Guadeloupe Conference. U.S. President Jimmy Carter, British Prime Minister James Callaghan, West German Chancellor Helmut Schmidt, and French President Valéry Giscard d'Estaing meet in French Guadeloupe to discuss the international situations. The four leaders agree that Mohammad Reza Pahlavi is beyond saving, and that if the Shah remains in power, a full-scale civil war could erupt, potentially triggering Soviet intervention.
- January 5: General Robert E. Huyser, the Deputy Commander-in-Chief of U.S. European Command, is dispatched to Iran. Throughout the remainder of January, Huyser bypasses Prime Minister Bakhtiar to conduct consecutive meetings with senior military generals, to convince them to support Bakhtiar cabinet, and prepare to orchestrate a coup as a contingency (Plan B). Concurrently, Ambassador William H. Sullivan engages with Khomeinists, operating under the expectation that Khomeini could be "Iran's Gandhi."
- January 9: Khomeini states in Le Monde interview: "After the Shah's departure from Iran, I will not become a president nor accept any other leadership role. Just like before, I limit my activities only to guiding and directing the people."
- January 11: Ambassador Sullivan urges the Shah to promptly depart from Iran.
- January 12: Council of Islamic Revolution is formed by Khomeini to manage the revolution. The names of its members are not disclosed.
- January 13: The Shah establishes a Regency Council to pave the way for a potential restoration of the monarchy even after his exile; In the afternoon of the same day, Khomeini appears on the CBS news program Face the Nation, stating that he will not hold any official public office in the next government but will instead guide the Iranian people. When the host asks, "Then you would be the dictator of Iran," Khomeini responds affirmatively, saying, "You can think of it that way"; On the same day, Zbigniew Brzezinski advises President Jimmy Carter that if the Bakhtiar cabinet fails to resolve the crisis, a coup d'état should be orchestrated in Iran to install an anti-communist military regime. Meanwhile, the Tudeh Party Executive Committee meets in Leipzig, Germany, where the skeptical Secretary-General Iraj Eskandari is ousted and Noureddin Kianouri, who advocates active support for Khomeini, is elected as the new Secretary-General.
- January 15: Warren Zimmermann, a counselor at the U.S. Embassy in Paris, establishes contact with Ebrahim Yazdi, initiating a series of frequent meetings throughout the remainder of January.
- January 16: Shah Mohammad Reza Pahlavi and Shahbanu Farah Pahlavi leave Iran for Aswan, Egypt, to be welcome by Anwar Sadat. The Shah states that he has left for vacation and medical treatment. On the same day, a 6.8 magnitude earthquake strikes the northeastern Khorasan Province, killing hundreds of people.
- January 20: The final political prisoners are released, including MEK leaders Massoud Rajavi, Ashraf Rajavi, Mousa Khiabani, Majid Moeini, and Masoumeh Shadmani, alongside Fadaiyan-e Khalq cadres such as Mostafa Madani; Mahmoud Taleghani visits released MEK leaders and lauds them with stating, "The torturers and interrogators were nervous at the mention of the name Mojahedin and feared the names of Massoud Rajavi and Mousa Khiabani. That was proof of the power of conviction and righteous faith"; On the same day, Khomeini declares his intention to announce the composition of the Islamic Revolutionary Council, while Bakhtiar counters that he will not tolerate any body challenging the authority of the legitimate government and will arrest anyone listed on such a council.
- January 22: Shah Mohammad Reza Pahlavi and his family leaves Egypt for Morocco.
- January 23: Jalaladdin Tehrani, chairman of the Royal Council, travels to France to meet with Khomeini to facilitate a transition of power, but resigns on the spot after accepting Khomeini's demand to declare the council illegal.
- January 27: Bakhtiar proposes to Khomeini that he will travel to France to meet in person and negotiate a compromise, but Khomeini flatly rejects the offer.

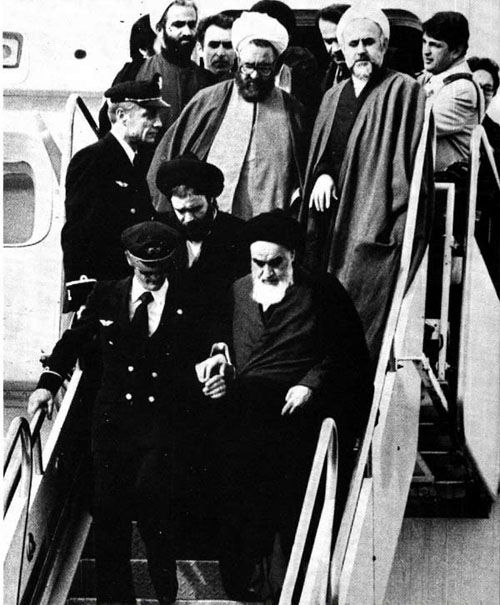
Khomeini and other figures returning to Iran aboard Air France Flight 4721, February 1, 1979

- February 1: Khomeini returns to Iran from exile. According to BBC up to five million people line up in the streets of the Iran's capital, Tehran to witness the homecoming of Khomeini. He delivers his first public address since his return at the Behesht-e Zahra cemetery, denouncing various political rivals and the United States.
- February 2: The NSA reports an analysis concluding that Khomeini "might be moderate and Westernized."

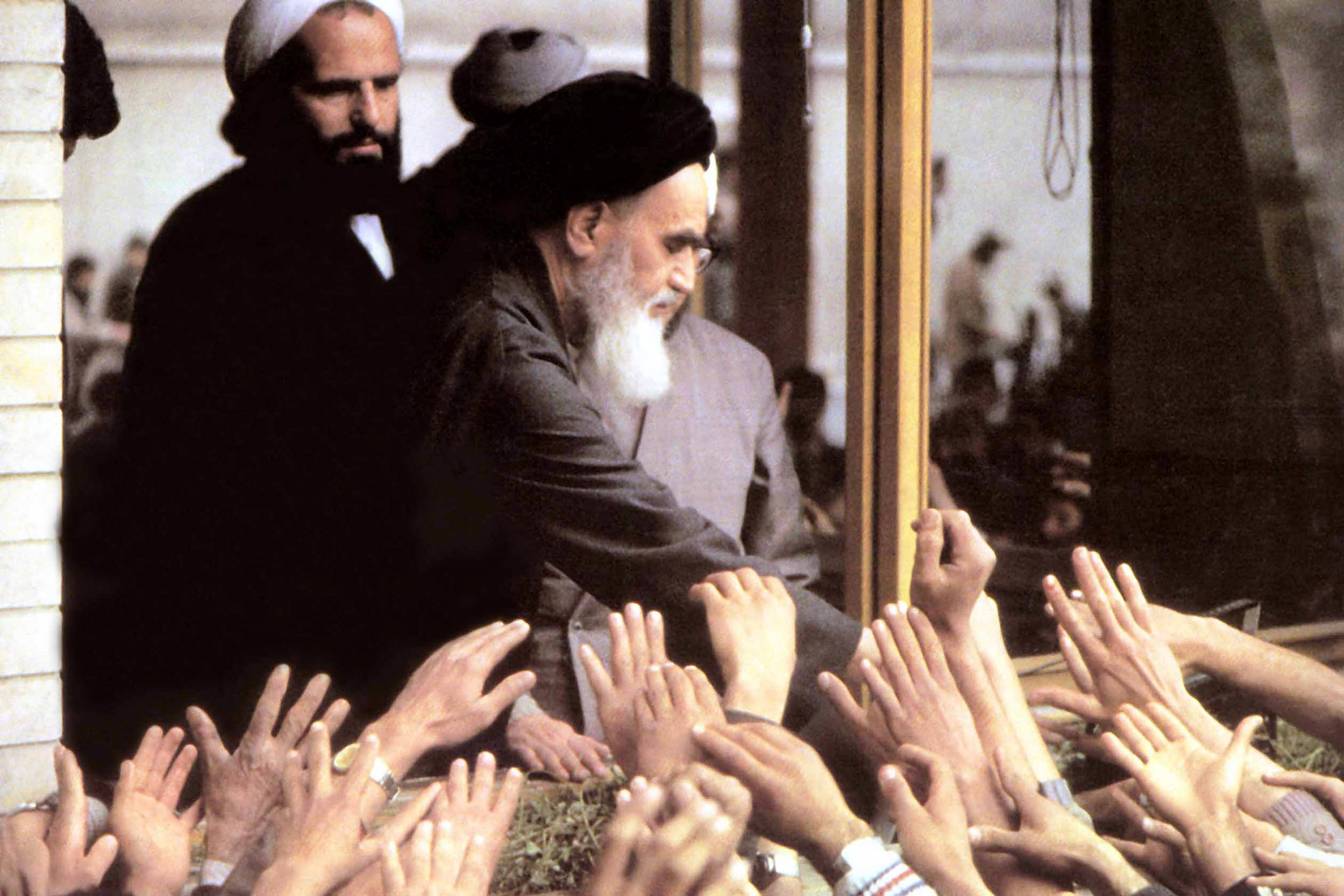
Khomeini enthusiastically welcomed at his temporary residence, Alavi Islamic High School in Tehran, February 3

- February 5: Khomeini holds a press conference in Tehran to publicly unveil his previously concealed doctrine of Velayat-e Faqih (Islamic government). Declaring that he acts with divine authority, he appoints Mehdi Bazargan as the Prime Minister of the Interim Government, mandating that all must obey Bazargan since he was designated under his supreme mandate.
- February 9: Fighting breaks out between pro-Khomeini technicians (Homafaran) of Iran Air Force and Iranian Imperial Guard.
- February 10: Bakhtiar announces martial law with an extended curfew and commands the arrest of Khomeini alongside over 200 dissident leaders. Khomeini orders followers to ignore it, and proclaims jihad against army units that do not surrender to revolutionaries. Leftist guerrillas and revolutionaries join rebel troops looting arms from police stations and other government facilities. The next morning, the heads of the army finally declare neutrality to avoid disintegration and "further bloodshed".
- February 11: Regime collapses. Revolution victorious. Pahlavi dynasty ends, concluding 2,705 years of Persian monarchy. Royal prime minister, Bakhtiar, goes into hiding, eventually finding exile in Paris; while crowds storm Evin Prison to release remaining prisoners; Zbigniew Brzezinski, completely oblivious to the situation, instructs Under Secretary David Newsom to call the Tehran embassy to query about the possibility of a military coup. Ambassador William H. Sullivan responds to Newsom with sharp verbal criticism against the National Security Advisor: "Tell Brzezinski to fuck off. You want that translated into Polish?"; Concurrently, General Robert E. Huyser also reports to Brzezinski that the probability of a successful coup remains highly unlikely.
- February 12: The committees of Islamic revolution were charged; On the same day, the U.S. Embassy comes under attack by approximately 75 armed gunmen, an assault that is eventually defused through the direct intervention of Ebrahim Yazdi.
- February 13: Ebrahim Yazdi is officially appointed as the Deputy Prime Minister for Revolutionary Affairs in the Interim Government of Mehdi Bazargan.
- February 14: Armed militants assault the U.S. Embassy, briefly taking Ambassador William H. Sullivan and other diplomatic personnel hostage before they are released. Over the following week, 6,500 American citizens evacuate from Iran; On the same day, armed clashes erupt between the left-wing People's Fedai and Khomeinist militias, persisting for four days.
- February 15: The Islamic Revolutionary Court lines up 24 high-ranking officials from the Shah's regime on the roof of the Refah school. Following an intervention by Yazdi to stop the summary executions, the execution of 20 officials is postponed; however, former SAVAK chief Nematollah Nassiri, Tehran Military Governor Mehdi Rahimi, Imperial Army Aviation Commander Manouchehr Khosrodad, and Isfahan Military Governor Reza Naji are summarily executed. This marks the first extrajudicial extrajudicial executions of the Iranian Revolution.
- February 16: In Tabriz, gunmen armed with machine guns attack the U.S. Consulate and make a failed attempt to hang Consul Michael Metrinko. All consulate personnel subsequently evacuate to Tehran, and the Tabriz Consulate is permanently closed.
- February 17: Yasser Arafat and Mostafa Chamran visit Iran. Urged by Khomeini to remain in his motherland, Chamran stays and is appointed Deputy Prime Minister for Revolutionary Affairs.

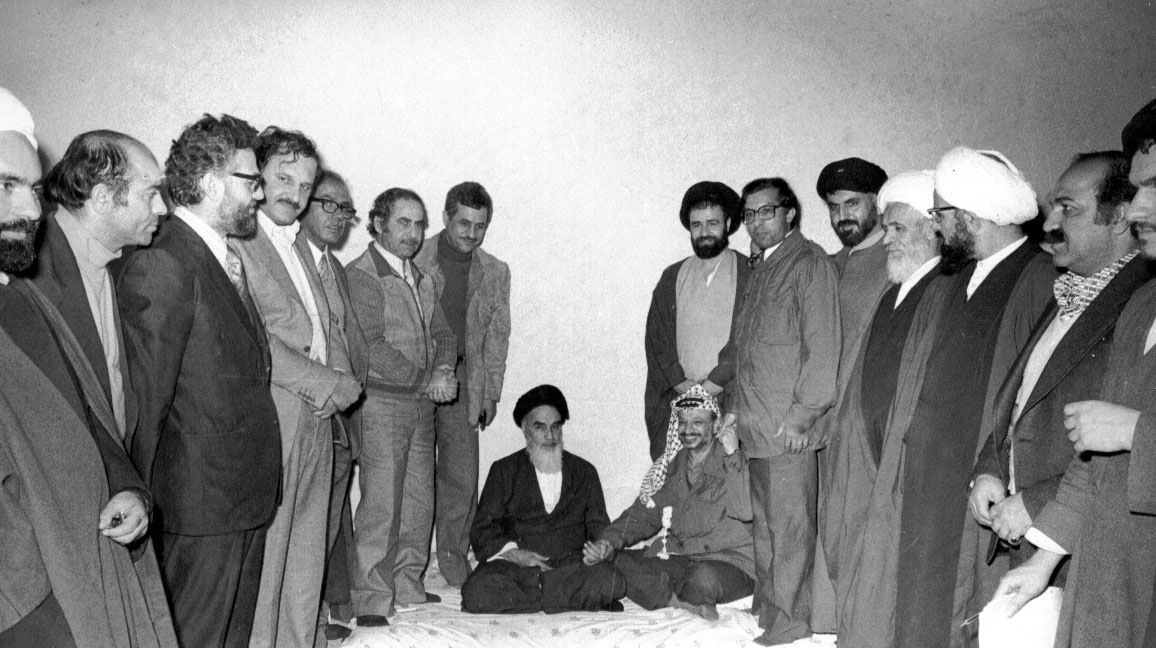
Arafat cheerfully meets with Khomeini

- February 18: Iranian revolutionary government closes the Israeli embassy in Tehran and hands over the facility to PLO, presenting the keys to Arafat; On the same day, Khomeinist clerics—including Mohammad Beheshti, Mohammad-Javad Bahonar, Ali Khamenei, Akbar Hashemi Rafsanjani, and Mousavi Ardebili—found the Islamic Republican Party.
- February 24: Khomeini appoints Sadegh Khalkhali as the head of the Islamic Revolutionary Court. Khalkhali earns the notorious nickname "The Hanging Judge" due to his indiscriminate issuance of death sentences without evidence, witnesses, or standard judicial procedures.
- February 25: The Muslim People's Republic Party is founded, centered around moderate clerics including Kazem Shariatmadari.
- February 26: Khomeini orders the judiciary to repeal the Family Protection Law, declaring it contrary to Sharia law; women are stripped of divorce right and child custody right, and the ban on early marriage is effectively neutralized.
- March 1: Khomeini declares that the victory of the revolution was achieved thanks to the struggle of the people, and pledges the provision of housing for the poor, along with free water, free electricity, and free public transportation. However, due to the subsequent war with Iraq and U.S. economic sanctions, public finances deplete, leaving the promises unfulfilled.
- March 2: Women are banned from being appointed as judges.
- March 5: A rally marking the 12th anniversary of former Prime Minister Mossaddegh's death is held, where Mahmoud Taleghani warns in a speech against the rise of a new dictatorship after the revolution.
- March 7: Khomeini decrees the mandatory wearing of the Hijab in the workplace, declaring that a woman without a hijab is akin to be “nude”.

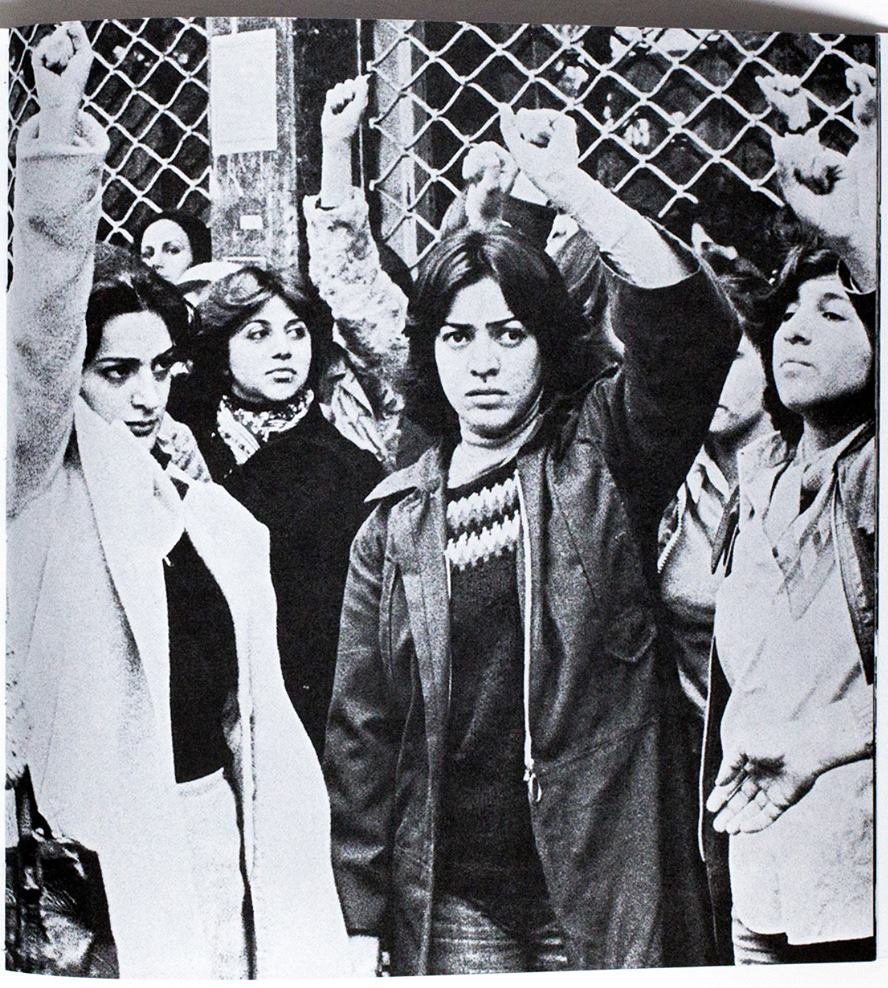
1979 International Women's Day protests in Tehran

- March 8: International Women's Day protests erupt in Tehran, with women's rights activists demonstrating for a week against the new government's mandatory hijab policy.
- March 11: Taleghani states in an interview with Ettela'at that the "Islamic hijab represents character and grace, but there’s no compulsion about it." On the same day, Tudeh Party Secretary-General Noureddin Kianouri vetoes the women's protests against mandatory hijab policy, claiming that it practically helps counter-revolutionary forces.
- March 15: Former Prime Minister Amir-Abbas Hoveyda is sentenced to death by the Islamic Revolutionary Court. As Hoveyda was a rare clean figure in the Pahlavi regime and was clearly scapegoated, an international campaign emerges to spare his life. Ebrahim Yazdi defends the legitimacy of the trial to the foreign press, while internally persuading Khomeini that such proceedings damage the nation's international standing, bringing a temporary halt to summary executions.
- Mid-March: Former U.S. Consul in Tabriz Michael Metrinko visits his previous post and returns to report that the Azeri population in the northwestern region is appalled by Khomeini's autocratic tendencies and medieval concepts regarding gender roles.
- March 17: Kurdish Revolt in Sanandaj, resulting in dozens to over a hundred casualties.
- March 26: Turkmen Revolt in Gonbad-e Qabus, leaving around a hundred dead. Valiollah Qarani, the first chief of Army after revolution, dismissed by the Interim Government of Iran under pressure of leftist. Naser Farbod is appointed as his replacement.
- March 29: Khomeini pledges to guarantee the rights of ethnic and religious minorities, declaring: "those who say the clergy will deny you your rights are betraying our nation. The clergy are at the forefront of those who respect your rights." Khomeini also states that Islam cares women more than men, asserting that women will possess the right to vote and to be elected, and will enjoy greater rights than Western women, including property rights and the freedom of career choice.
- March 30: Shah Mohammad Reza Pahlavi and his family arrives in the Bahamas from Morocco. On the same day, Khomeini encourages participation in the referendum, asserting that the Islamic Republic will be a system that brings a free future, happiness, and independence.
- March 30–31: A referendum on establishing an Islamic Republic is held, boycotted by the National Democratic Front, Fadaiyan-e Khalq, Peykar, and the Kurdish population. Shariatmadari approves the referendum but voices concern over the lack of explanation regarding what an "Islamic Republic" entails, given only a yes/no choice. Meanwhile, secret voting is compromised as yes-ballots are green papers and no-ballots are red papers.
- April 1: 98.2% of votes tallied are in favor of an Islamic republic. Islamic republic established. In a speech praising the public's choice, Khomeini states that "putting criminals on trial is anti-human rights, and human rights means killing a criminal immediately as soon as their identity is confirmed." Khomeini subsequently informs Khalkhali that the suspension of summary executions has ended.
- April 6: U.S. Ambassador William H. Sullivan is abruptly dismissed and recalled to Washington after months of exchanging mutual recriminations with Zbigniew Brzezinski via diplomatic cables.
- April 7: Sadegh Khalkhali proceeds to Qasr Prison and executes Amir-Abbas Hoveyda.
- April 12: Ebrahim Yazdi steps down as Deputy Prime Minister for Revolutionary Affairs and is appointed as the Minister of Foreign Affairs; Khomeinist militias arrest Taleghani's two sons and daughter-in-law.
- April 15: In a gesture of protest against Khomeini, Taleghani goes into hiding, prompting thousands of his supporters to march and chant, "Taleghani, you are the soul of the revolution!"
- Mid-April: the Tudeh Party leaders, including Noureddin Kianouri, return to Iran and begin rebuilding their party organization.
- April 17: Bloody clashes between Kurds and Azeris erupt in Naqadeh.
- April 19: Khomeini summons Taleghani to Qom to demand submission, later stating to the media that "Mr. Taleghani is sorry for what happened." Displeased, Khomeini refuses to refer to him as an Ayatollah, using the title "Mr. Taleghani" instead.
- April 20: Valiollah Qarani assassinated by the Forqan group.

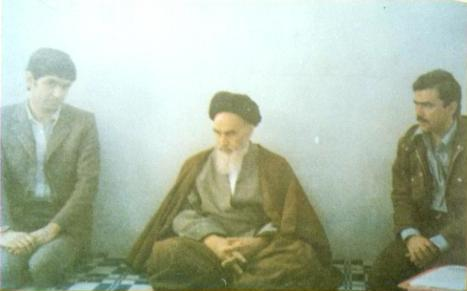
Rajavi, Khomeini, and Khiabani.

- April 26: the MEK leaders Massoud Rajavi and Mousa Khiabani meet with Khomeini in Qom to congratulate the victory of the revolution and demand a share of power. Khomeini replies that Islam values freedom above all else, asserting that everything is free as long as it does not violate effat-e omumi (public chastity and/or decency).
- May 1: Morteza Motahhari, chairman of the Council of the Islamic Revolution, is assassinated by the Forqan Group; Mahmoud Taleghani succeeds him as chairman. On the same day, Khomeini delivers a speech supporting the rights of workers and peasants: "Islam grants you rights ... It grants rights to all working women and men, to all peasant women and men. Islam values them and will give them their rights."
- May 4: Khomeini delivers a speech stating that Islam is a religion of logic and that terrorism is incompatible with Islam.
- May 5: Islamic Revolution Guards Corps established by a decree issued by Ayatollah Khomeini.
- May: Peykar attempts to form a united front of Marxist-Leninist factions in Tehran, including Razmandegan, Komala, and Sarbedaran, but the effort fails as other factions refuse to accept Peykar's leadership.
- May 13: Sadegh Khalkhali sentences 12 members of the Pahlavi royal family to death in absentia.
- Mid-May: The Tudeh Party relocates its headquarters to Tehran, officializing the re-establishment of the party.
- May 17: Spearheaded by Senator Jacob Javits, the U.S. Senate overwhelmingly passes a resolution condemning the human rights violations of the Iranian revolutionary regime. The Bazargan cabinet, protesting against foreign intervention in domestic affairs, downgrades diplomatic relations with the United States to the chargé d'affaires level.
- June 4: In response to economic situations, Khomeini declares that Iran is vast and self-sufficient, and therefore does not need other countries.
- June 5: Early indication of split between Khomeini and non-theocratic intellectuals. In a speech, Khomeini asked: "Who are they that wish to divert our Islamic movement from Islam? ... Intellectuals, do not be Western-style intellectuals, imported intellectuals."
- June 10: Shah Mohammad Reza Pahlavi and his family arrives in Mexico after being denied a visa extension in the Bahamas
- June 14: Official preliminary draft of the constitution published. Draft constitution contains Council of Guardians to veto un-Islamic legislation, but no Velayat-e faqih (Guardianship of the Islamic Jurists). Khomeini declares it `correct.`
- June 15: Khomeini attacks liberal and leftwing groups as `counter-revolutionaries` against Islam. Groups had advocated the election of a Constituent Assembly to write the new constitution. "No `Westernized jurists` are needed to write the constitution, only `noble members of the clergy.`" "Campaign launched to popularised the idea of the velayat-e faqih," hitherto virtually unknown to most Iranians.
- June 17: "Construction Jihad" was established by the order of the Ayatollah Khomeini.
- July 16: The newly appointed U.S. Chargé d'Affaires Bruce Laingen meets with Iranian Foreign Minister Ebrahim Yazdi. Yazdi expresses that both he and Bazargan desire to maintain diplomatic relations with the United States.
- August 7: Ayandegan, "the daily newspaper with the widest circulation" in Iran, but "which had agitated against Velayat-e faqih" is banned under new press law for "counter-revolutionary policies and acts."
- August 8: demonstrators gather in Tehran to protest closing of Ayandegan. In the next three days 41 newspapers and periodicals are banned under the press law.
- August 10: Khomeini denounces opponents of the Assembly of Experts and defenders of Ayandegan newspaper calling them "wild animals" and saying, "We will not tolerate them any more ... After each revolution several thousand of these corrupt elements are executed in public and burnt ... We will close all parties except the one, or a few which act in a proper manner ..."
- August 12: More demonstrations. National Democratic Front schedules a mass demonstration to protest the closure of newspapers like Ayandegan. Demonstration is "viciously attacked by Hezbollah thugs." Shortly thereafter a warrant is issued for the arrest of Hedayat Matin Daftari, one of the National Democratic Front's leaders. Hundreds are injured by rocks, clubs, chains and iron bars. The next day Khomeini supporters attack and loot offices of leftist groups in retaliation for demonstrations.
- August 15: Kurdish Revolt in Paveh, resulting in hundreds of casualties. Deputy Prime Minister Mostafa Chamran leads special forces in a helicopter assault. Personally commanding urban combat, he suppresses the revolt and emerges as a war hero.
- August 18: Assembly of Experts for Constitution which were elected by people, gather to write a new constitution. As a result of a left-wing election boycott, 55 out of the 73 members of the Assembly of Experts for Constitution are filled by Khomeinists.
- August 31: Khomeini and Taleghani implicitly claim that Israel and the Soviet Union are behind the Kurdish revolt.

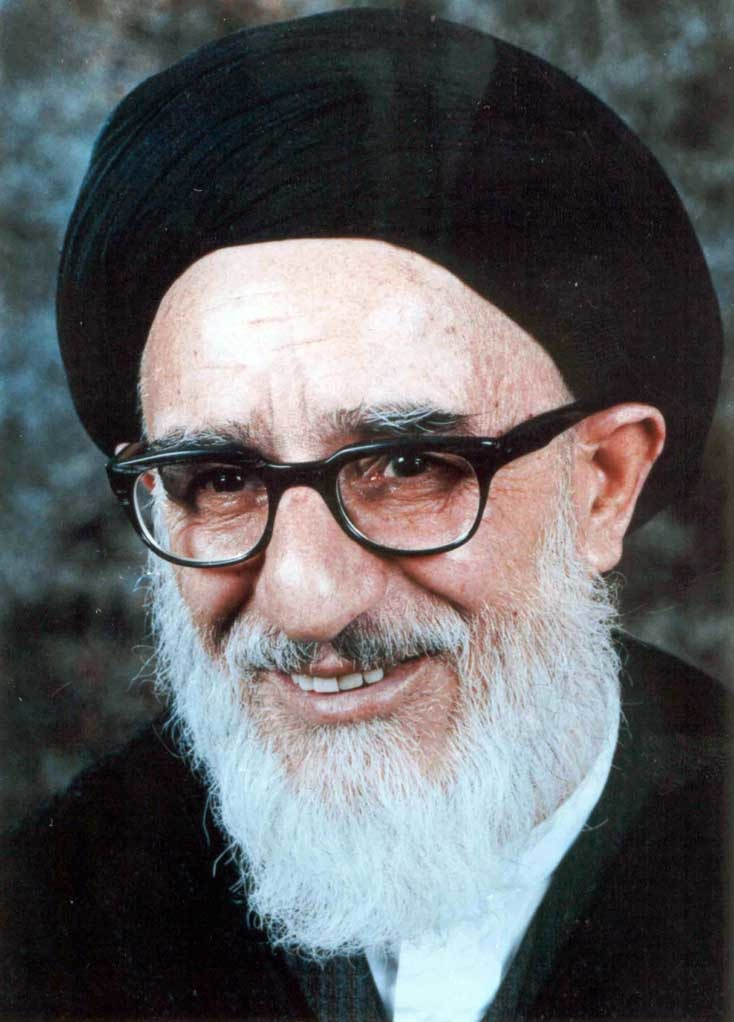
The death of Ayatollah Taleghani, the man of the people, and a liberation theologian, marks the dissolution of the leftist focal point within the revolutionary regime

- September 9: Mahmoud Taleghani, chairman of the Council of the Islamic Revolution, dies suddenly; Mohammad Beheshti succeeds him as chairman. A friend of the left, Taleghani is considered the second most popular ayatollah after Khomeini.
- September 12: Khomeini conducts an interview with Oriana Fallaci. Fallaci aggressively removes and throws off her chador in front of Khomeini, prompting him to abruptly leave the room.
- Late September: Michael Metrinko, the former U.S. Consul in Tabriz, returns to the United States for vacation and is summoned to the Department of State headquarters. As the field reports submitted by Metrinko were the only pessimistic assessments received by the Department, he is called in to provide a detailed briefing. However, just minutes before the meeting is scheduled to begin, security personnel bar his entry because his security clearance is too low. Metrinko has no choice but to leave.
- October 4: Iranian Foreign Minister Ebrahim Yazdi meets with U.S. Secretary of State Cyrus Vance at the United Nations General Assembly in New York. The meeting breaks down as Yazdi vehemently denounces Vance; Vance later recalls that Yazdi appeared self-conscious about the reaction of other Iranian officials who were transcribing his remarks.
- October 8: Mostafa Chamran is appointed as Minister of Defense.
- October 14: Assembly of Experts approves draft of new constitution. In it, Khomeini holds the position of vali-ye faqih, which includes "command of the armed forces"
- October 22: Shah Mohammad Reza Pahlavi is allowed to enter United States for gall bladder treatment. Khomeini speaks out angrily at this "evidence of American plotting." Revolutionary denunciation of the Great Satan (America) intensifies. On the same day, Shariatmadari states during an interview with Dutch national television that the freedom of faith, assembly, and civil rights of Christians, Jews, Zoroastrians, and other minorities must be protected and respected, while noting that Baháʼís should be prohibited from proselytizing. He cites Hojabr Yazdani as an example, implying that Baháʼís received unfair economic privileges under the Shah's regime.
- October 23: Henry Precht and Bruce Laingen meet with Ebrahim Yazdi to inform him that the Shah is terminally ill and entering the United States for medical treatment. Yazdi responds that while he personally believes their statement, but the Iranian public will find it impossible to believe.
- November 1: Pupil Day is established to commemorate the shooting incident at Tehran University on November 4 of the previous year. In his celebratory speech, Khomeini urges the youth to expand the scope of their struggle against American plots; On the same day, Prime Minister Bazargan and Foreign Minister Yazdi, visiting Algeria to mark the 25th anniversary of Algerian independence, meet and take photographs with Zbigniew Brzezinski. This event ignites widespread public fury within Iran, accusing the prime minister of betraying the revolution and alerts the "return of American influence."

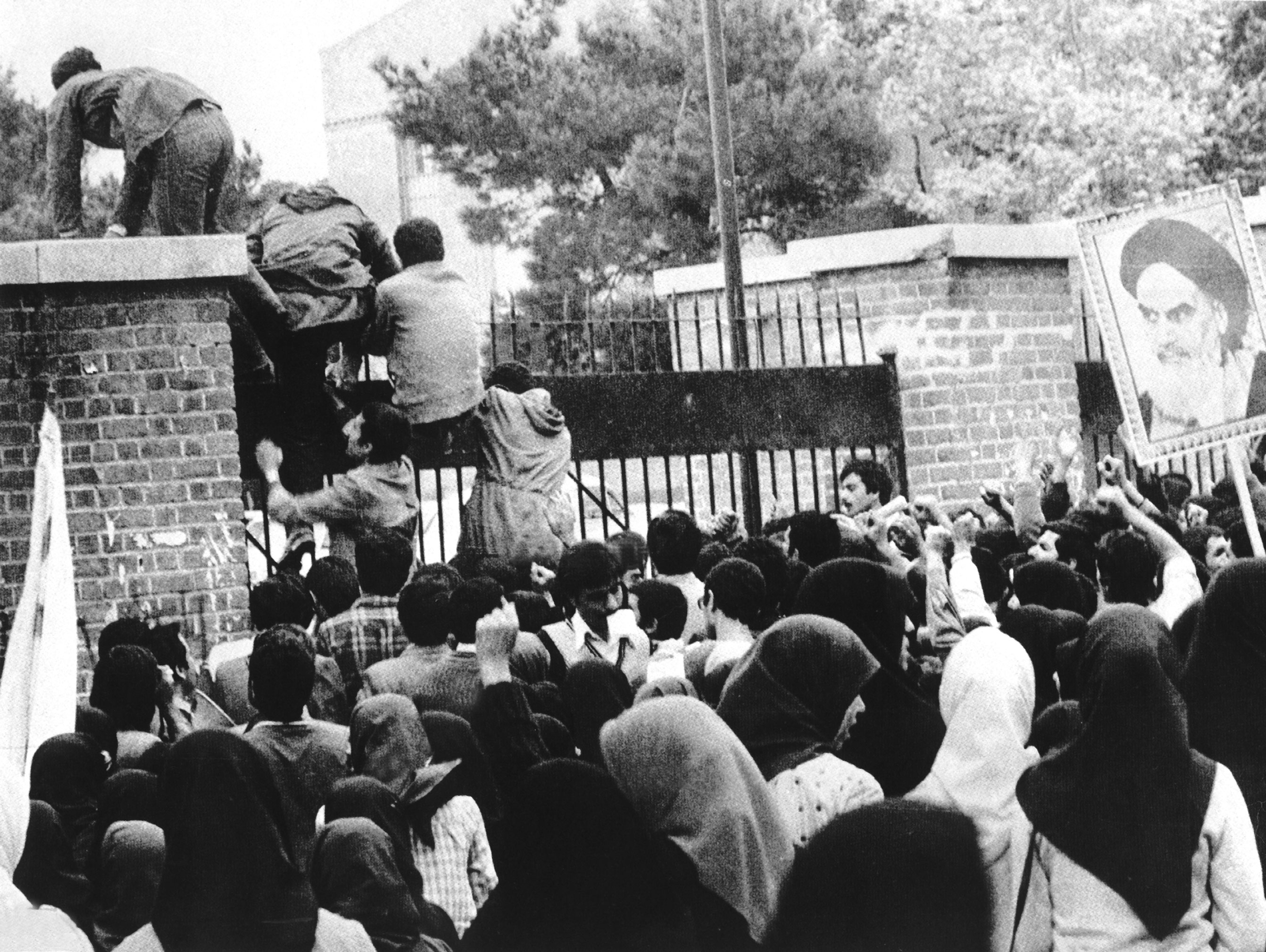
Iranian students climbing over the wall of the U.S. Embassy, November 4, 1979

- November 4: A protest demonstration erupts near the U.S. Embassy in Tehran, culminating in an assault where approximately 500 members of the Muslim Student Followers of the Imam's Line climb over the embassy fence and breach the compound. The attack was planned before. Embassy clerks ask for help from Foreign Minister Yazdi, to no avail. Embassy guards defend the compound with tear gas because firearms are permitted for use. Secret documents are burned in the embassy. Iranian hostage crisis begins. About ninety people are taken hostage of which 66 are Americans.
- November 5: Iranian government cancels all defence treaties with the United States and Soviet Union.
- November 6: Mehdi Bazargan, prime minister of The Interim Government of Iran, resigns, "unable to muster" support for "eviction of the students." Khomeini immediately accepts his resignation along with all the other members of his cabinet.
- November 7: U.S. president Jimmy Carter's appointed delegation arrives to Iran to negotiate to free the hostages.. Members of the delegation are former federal judge Ramsey Clark and William Miller with the intent to negotiate the end of the hostage crisis. Ayatollah Khomeini refuses to see the delegation.

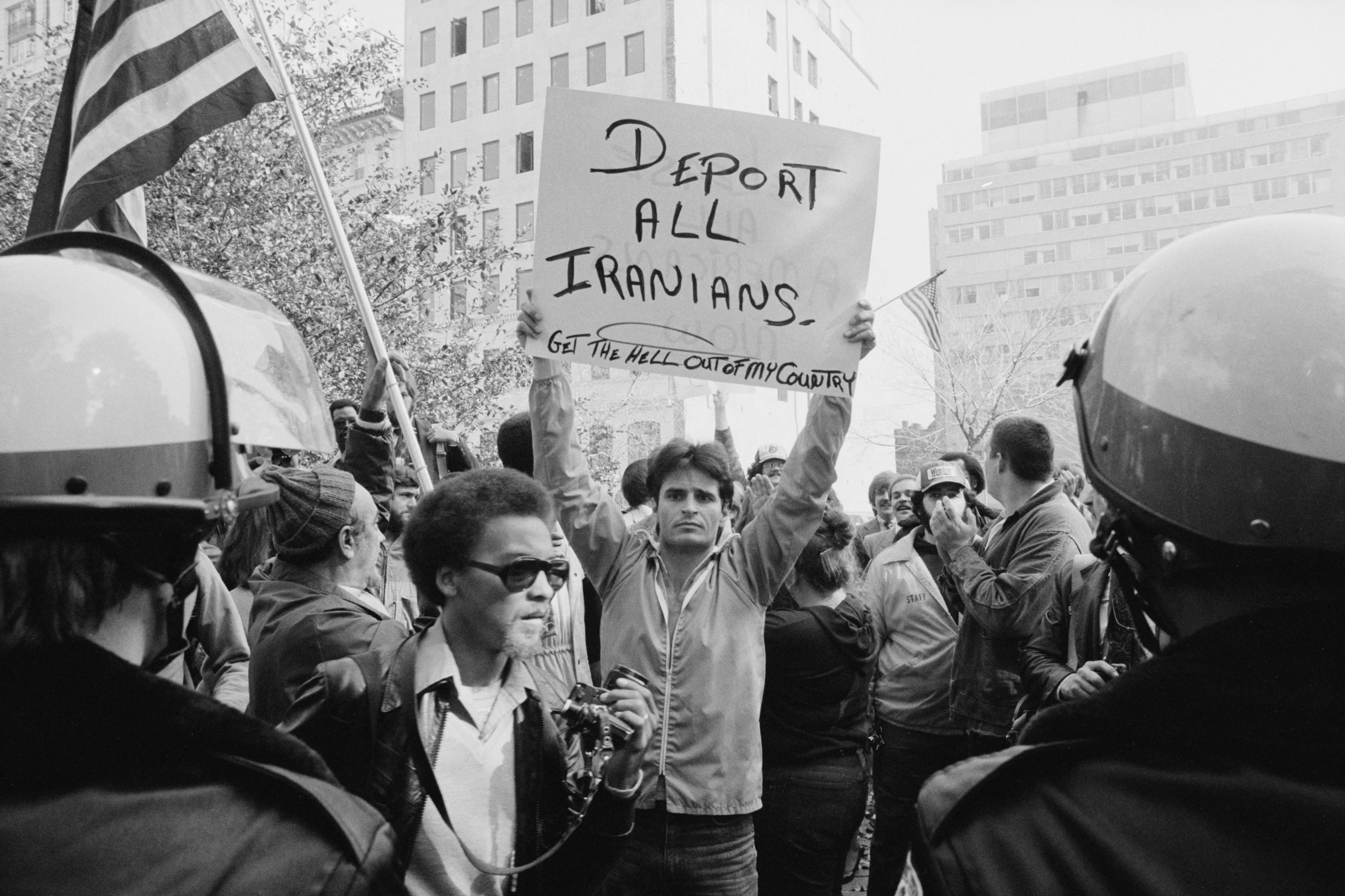
Anti-Iranian protest in Washington, D.C., November 9, 1979

- November 12: Acting Foreign Minister Abolhassan Banisadr informs that the hostages will be released if U.S. deports the Shah back to Iran.
- November 14: U.S. Government freezes the all property and interests in the property of the government of Iran and the Central Bank of Iran.
- November 17: Khomeini orders the release of eight African-American and five female hostages.
- November 22: Mexico announces it is unwilling to accept the return of Mohammad Reza Pahlavi.
- November 29: U.S. sues Iran to the Hague International Court for violating international law. On the same day, Sadegh Ghotbzadeh is appointed as the Minister of Foreign Affairs.

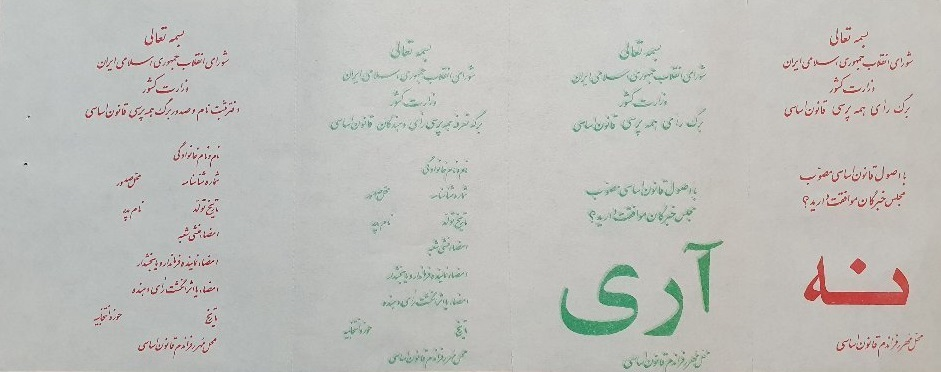
Ballots for the Iranian constitutional referendum, December 1979

- December 2–3: A referendum on adopting the new constitution passes with a 99.50% approval rate, establishing Khomeini as the Rahbar (Supreme Leader) with absolute power. Aside from the Islamic Republican Party, the Freedom Movement, and the Tudeh Party, all other political factions (including the National Front, the National Democratic Front, the Muslim People's Republic Party, the People's Mojahedin, Fadaiyan-e Khalq Majority and Minority factions, the Dehghani Group, the PDKI, and Komala) boycott the referendum.

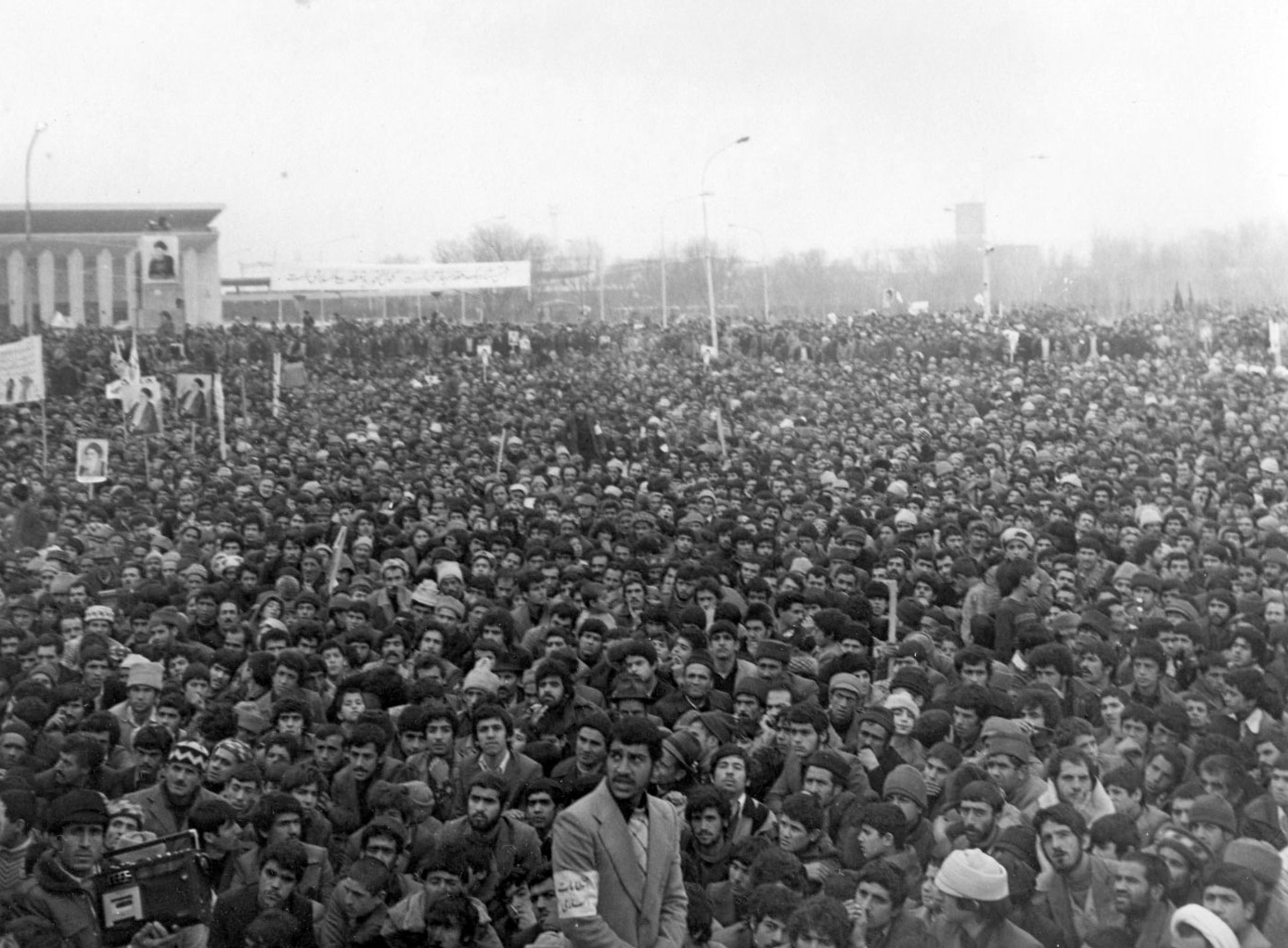
Pro-Shariatmadari demonstrators in Tabriz

- December 6: In Tabriz, the capital of Iranian Azerbaijan, around 50,000 Azeris supporting Grand Ayatollah Shariatmadari uprise and seize the broadcasting station, leading to dozens of casualties following a shootout with the Revolutionary Guards.
- December 7: The Shah's nephew, Shahriar Shafiq, is assassinated by a masked gunman in Paris, France.
- December 8: The office of the Radical Movement of Iran is raided. Rahmatollah Moghaddam Maraghei, an Azeri politician who is a member of the Radical Movement and allied with Shariatmadari, is accused of being a CIA spy and flees. Khomeini condemns Maraghei, claiming that copies of Playboy and some whisky were discovered at his residence. Declassified documents later reveal that Maraghei was indeed a CIA informant.
- December 10: Teachers and students of the Qom Seminary send an open letter to Shariatmadari, demanding the dissolution of the Muslim People's Republic Party for being "anti‐Islamic and had created the disturbances along with counterrevolutionaries, including the CIA". Shariatmadari accuses the Islamic Revolutionary Council of branding all political factions other than Khomeinist as American puppets and enemies of Islam, but his statement is completely suppressed in the domestic Iranian media.
- December 15: Shah Mohammad Reza Pahlavi leaves the U.S. for Panama
- December 16: Shah Mohammad Reza Pahlavi arrives to Panama
- December 18: Mohammad Mofatteh assassinated by Forqan group.

== Post-Revolution ==
=== 1980 ===
- January 11: The Revolutionary Guards raid the Muslim People's Republic Party office in Tabriz, arresting party members and dissolving the party.
- January 25: The first presidential election of the Islamic Republic. Abolhassan Banisadr elected as President of Islamic republic. His term in office is beset by struggles between him and officials of the Islamic Republic Party.

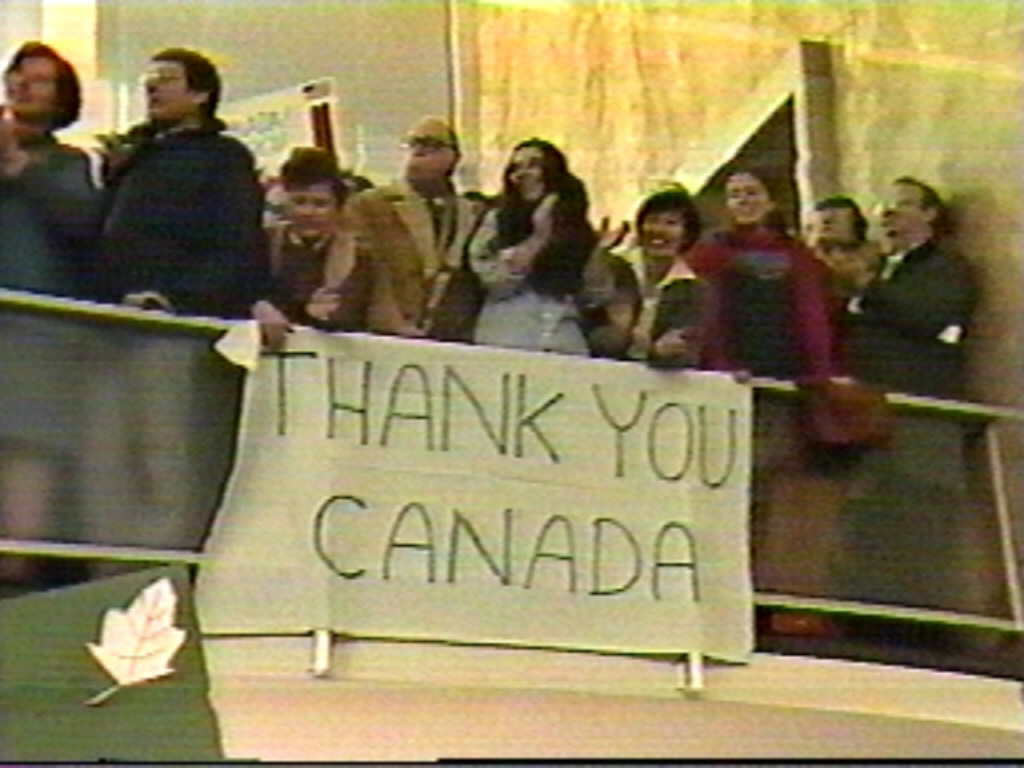
Americans welcoming the six freed hostage by Canadian diplomats during the Iran hostage crisis, 1980

- January 28: Six American diplomats escape with Canadian passports from Iran with help from the Canadian Embassy in Tehran.
- March–May: The clerical regime excommunicates the MEK as Munafiqin (hypocrites), prompting Hezbollah militants to attack MEK offices and rallies.
- March 12: Iranian government demands that the Panamanian government arrest the Shah Mohammad Reza Pahlavi.
- March 15: First round of elections of first Islamic parliament. Islamic Republican Party mobilises its network among clergy, komitehs and the revolutionary guard. Hezbollah attacks rallies and offices of opposition parties, primarily the Mojahedin-e Khalq, as most other parties have been effectively repressed. The election results for the 270 seats are as follows: the Islamic Republican Party wins 85 seats, the Banisadr faction 33, the Bazargan faction 20, the Sanjabi faction 4, and independents 115. Clerics hold 137 seats, a majority of the 270 total. The left-wing factions fails to win a single seat.
- March 21: Cultural Revolution in Iran begins. In New Year's speech, Khomeini inveighs against "imperialist universities" where those "cloaked with the West" teach and study. Declares the universities must "become Islamic."
- March 23: Shah Mohammad Reza Pahlavi leaves Panama to return to Egypt.
- March 25: Shah Mohammad Reza Pahlavi returns to Egypt.
- March–May: Mojahedin-e Khalq (MEK), are denounced and its rallies and offices are attacked.
- April 7: U.S. cuts all diplomatic relationship with Iran and puts Iran under economic embargo.
- April 9: Grand Ayatollah Muhammad Baqir al-Sadr, the founder of the Islamic Dawa Party, is executed by the Saddam Hussein regime in Iraq. Although a cousin of Musa al-Sadr, he, unlike his cousin Musa or the Iraqi Shia leader Grand Ayatollah Abu al-Qasim al-Khoei, supported Khomeini.

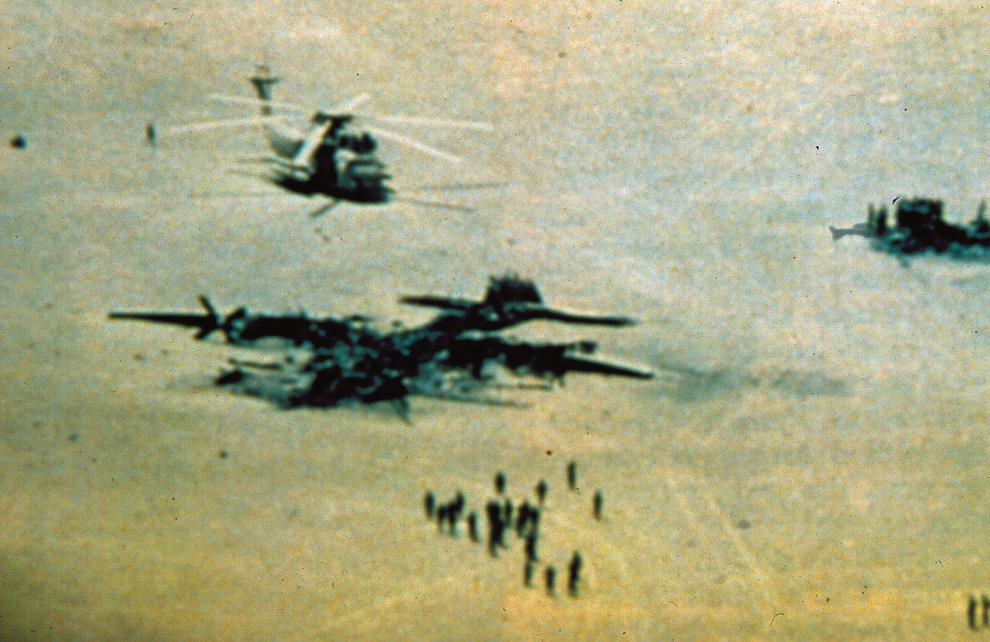
Wreckage of a Delta Force Lockheed EC-130 deployed in Operation Eagle Claw

- April 25: Operation Eagle Claw;Tehran hostage rescue mission fails with the death of eight U.S. soldiers because of sand storm. Khomeini credits divine intervention on behalf of Islam. His prestige is greatly enhanced. Banisadr's is further reduced.
- April 27: Demonstration led by People's Mujahedin of Iran in Tehran draws 150,000. Chief prosecutor bans the Mujahedeen from demonstrating.
- June 12: Formation of the university jihad by decree of Ayatollah Khomeini. and The Cultural Revolution to islamization of universities.
- June: The split within the Fadaiyan-e Khalq becomes official, dividing into the Majority and Minority factions.
- July 5: Islamization of state bureaucracy begins. Approximately 20,000 teachers and nearly 8000 military officers are discharged; and women not wearing the Hijab are banned from entering government offices.
- July 11: Nojeh Coup attempt by a portion of the air force personnels is unsuccessful. They are accused of being loyal to Shah and 121 of them are executed On the same day, one American hostage is freed for health reasons. 52 hostages are still in the embassy compound.
- July 27: Shah Mohammad Reza Pahlavi dies in Cairo, Egypt after a cancer operation.
- July–August: John Connally and Ben Barnes of the Reagan presidential campaign camp tour six Middle Eastern countries, conducting a covert operation to request that a message be relayed to Iran urging them to hold the hostages until after the upcoming presidential election.
- August 3: Sadegh Ghotbzadeh steps down as Minister of Foreign Affairs and is succeeded by Karim Khodapanahi.
- August 12: Banisadr forced to accept Mohammad-Ali Rajai as prime minister. Banisadr considers Rajai to be "incompetent", but Rajai has the support of the Islamic Revolution Party.
- August 25: The trial begins for five perpetrators of the Cinema Rex arson attack, including Hossein Takbalizadeh.
- September 4: Takbalizadeh and the four other perpetrators are publicly executed in Abadan.
- 12 September: Khomeini puts new terms to release the hostages; U.S. has to release all of the Shah's currency assets from his American bank accounts. According to the Iranian government, the worth of the foreign assets are about 32 billion U.S. dollars.
- September 22: Iran–Iraq War starts. Massive invasion of Iran by Iraq following border skirmishes and a dispute over the Arvand Rūd (Persian: اروندرود, literally Arvand River) or as it is known in Iraq the Shatt al-Arab (Arabic: شط العرب, literally Coast/Beach of the Arabs) waterway. Marks beginning of a war that will last eight years.
- September 30: Operation Scorch Sword. Iran Air Force launches an airstrike on the Tuwaitha Nuclear Research Center in Iraq, damaging the nuclear reactor.
- October 26: Khorramshahr occupied by Iraqis during war.

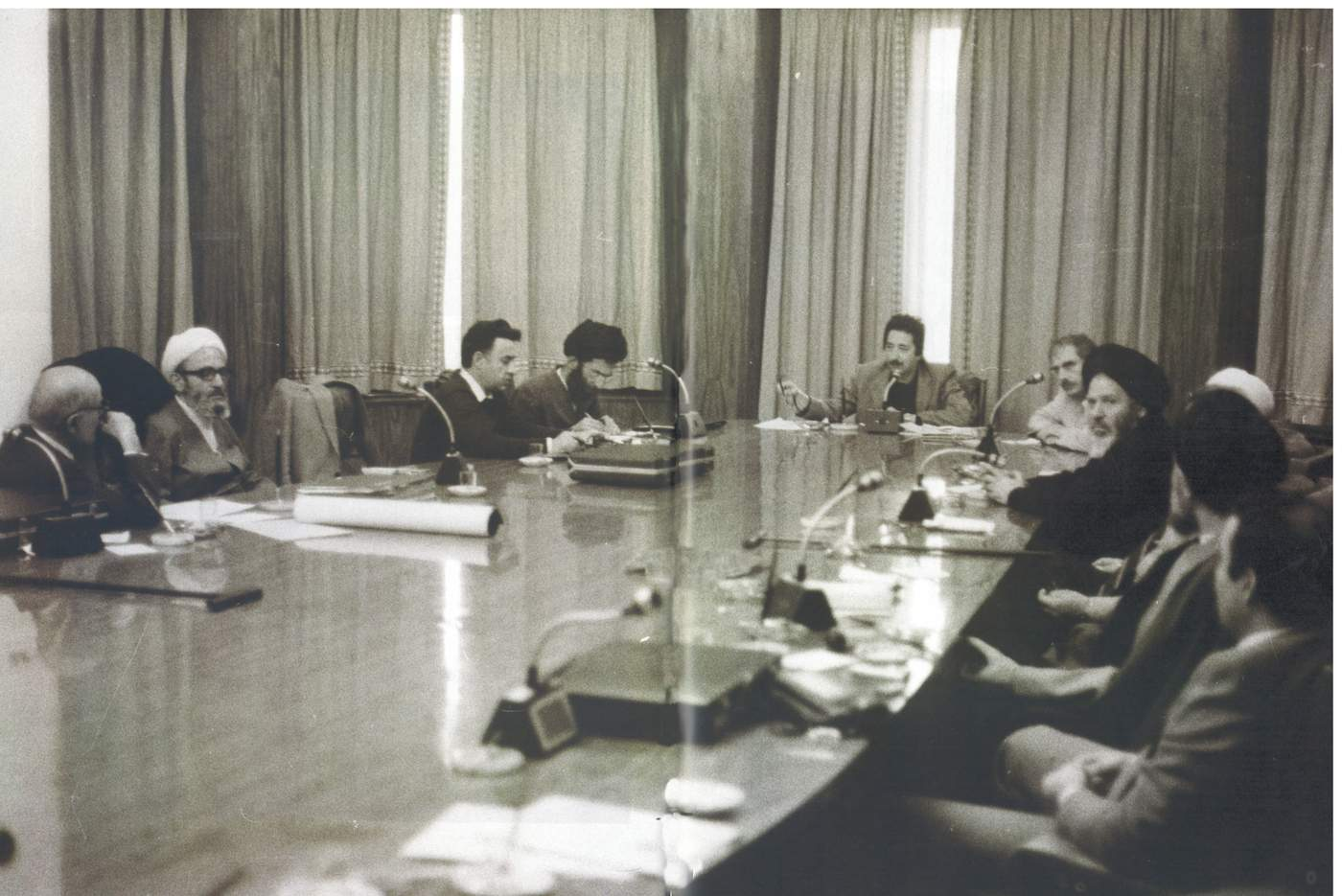
The Council of the Islamic Revolution, November 1, 1980

- November 10: U.S. Deputy Secretary of State Warren Christopher’s delegation negotiates alongside the Algerian government with a representative from the Iranian government on terms to free the hostages.

=== 1981 ===
- January 19: Algiers Accords, between Iran and the United States, mediated by Algeria, to resolve an Iran hostage crisis. In exchange for the release of the hostages by Iran, the United States agreed to unfreeze US$8 billion of Iranian State assets from American banks.
- January 20: Ronald Reagan is inaugurated as president of the US: Only 20 minutes from Reagan's oath, Iran releases all 52 hostages who are flown to West Germany via Algeria where former U.S. president Jimmy Carter takes them back to the United States. USA conceded to transfer money, as well as export military equipment to Iran.
- February: The MEK and Peykar instigate unrests in Tabriz, threatening the Tabriz Airport; the government deploys two brigades from the 28th Infantry for suppression.
- June 7: Operation Opera. The Israeli Air Force conducts an airstrike on the Iraqi Osirak nuclear reactor. Iran provides assistance and intelligence coordination for the operation.
- June 8: Abolhassan Banisadr calls for resistance to dictatorship. Khomeini forbids street demonstrations.
- June 15: Secular factions, including the National Front, publicly condemn the Islamization of the criminal justice system. On the same day, Khomeini issues a fatwa accusing them of ertedad (apostasy).

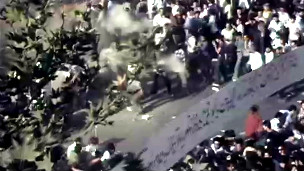
30 Khordad protests

- June 20: The 30 Khordad protests break out as a massive demonstration led by the MEK and Banisadr against Khomeini's theocracy, drawing 500,000 participants in Tehran alone before being violently suppressed, followed by the execution of thousands by year-end.
- June 21: Abolhassan Banisadr, first president of Islamic republic, was impeached by the parliament. On the same day, Minister of Defense Mostafa Chamran is killed in action while fighting Iraqi forces on the Dehlaviyeh front. Peykar leader Mohsen Fazel is executed.
- Late June: Peykar splits into three factions.
- June 21–27: Conflicts between Mujahideen and authorities intensifies.
- June 22: Abolhassan Banisadr was dismissed by Supreme Leader, Khomeini.
- June 26: Failed assassination attempt on Ali Khamenei by MEK.
- June 28: Explosion of the headquarters of Islamic Republic Party by MEK which resulted in killing of 72 high-ranking officials and representatives including Mohammad Beheshti the secretary-general of the party and head of Judicial system of Iran.
- July: The mandatory wearing of the Hijab expands beyond the workplace to all outdoor public spaces, including markets, squares, and streets; women are now unable to leave their houses without wearing a hijab.
- July 24: Presidential election took place and Mohammad-Ali Rajai chosen as president.
- July 29: Former President Banisadr flees from Iran to France by Iranian Air Force Boeing 707 alongside by MEK leader Massoud Rajavi

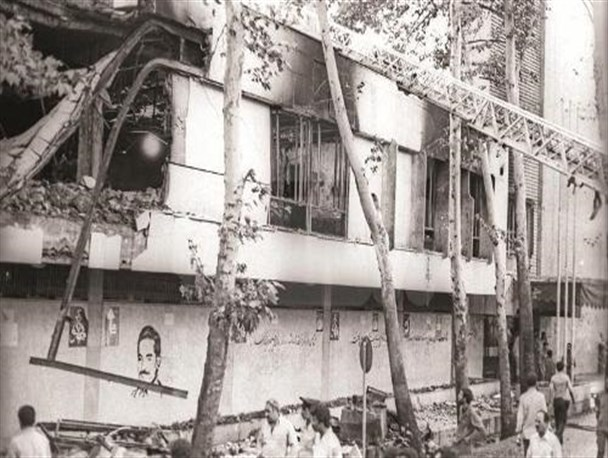
The Prime Minister's office completely destroyed by a bomb explosion

- August 30: The Prime Minister's office is bombed by the MEK, assassinating eight officials including President Mohammad-Ali Rajai and his prime minister (Mohammad-Javad Bahonar).
- September 2: parliament voted in favour of Mohammad Reza Mahdavi-Kani as the prime minister of The Interim government of the Islamic Republic, to hold next presidential election and govern country until then.
- September 5: French ambassador to Lebanon Louis Delamare is shot to death in West Beirut by pro-Iranian gunman
- September 21: The Interim government of the Islamic Republic was established after assassination of Mohammad Ali Rajai and Mohammad Javad Bahonar.
- September 27 to September 29: Operation Samen-ol-A'emeh; Breaking the siege of Abadan which was the turning point in Iran–Iraq War.
- October 2: Presidential election took place and Ali Khamenei chosen as president.
- October 13: Ali Khamenei officially became president.
- October 29: Iranian parliament voted in favour of Mir-Hossein Mousavi as the prime minister and the new government replaced Interim Government.

=== 1982 ===
- February 3: Peykar leaders Hossein Ahmadi-Rouhani and Alireza Sepasi-Ashtiani are arrested; Sepasi-Ashtiani dies under torture, while Ahmadi-Rouhani appears on television to recant and announce his cooperation with the government to eradicate Peykar.
- February 8: Mousa Khiabani, the second-in-command of the MEK, is killed in a clash with the IRGC during a raid on a safehouse in northern Tehran. A total of 23 people, including Khiabani's wife Azar Rezaei and Rajavi's wife Ashraf Rabiei, are killed. The MEK terms this event the "Ashura of the Mujahedin." This deals a severe blow to the MEK's domestic capabilities within Iran.

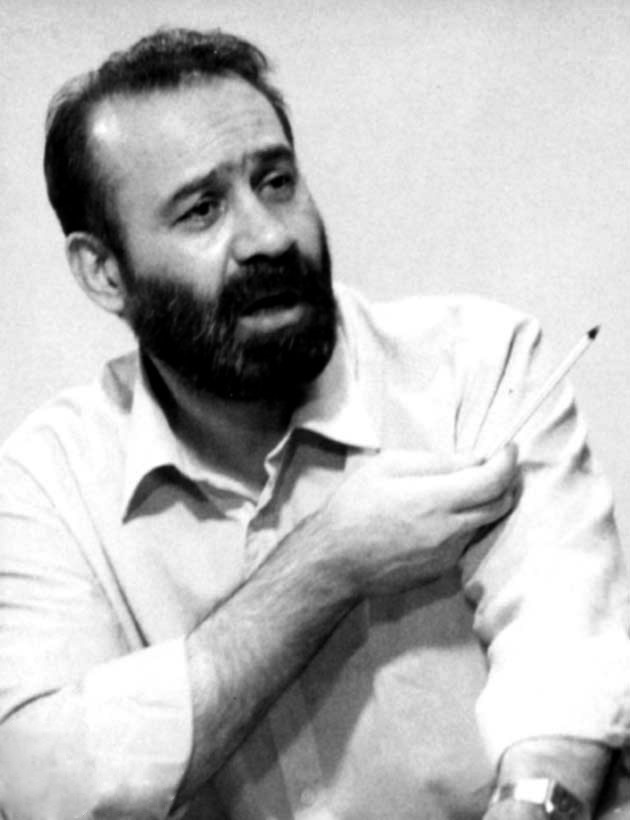
Ghotbzadeh defending himself at his trial

- April 8: Several politicians, military officers, and clerics, including Sadegh Ghotbzadeh and the son-in-law of Kazem Shariatmadari, are arrested on charges of plotting to assassinate Khomeini. Ghotbzadeh initially denies all charges but, under torture, confesses that Grand Ayatollah Shariatmadari was also involved in the plot.
- April 14: Peykar temporarily takes six hostages at the Iranian consulate in Geneva.
- April 16: The IRGC surrounds the residence of Grand Ayatollah Shariatmadari in Qom. His family members are subsequently arrested and subjected to torture. Shariatmadari is placed under house arrest, which continues until his death in 1986.
- May 24: Liberation of Khorramshahr. The tide of the Iran–Iraq War turns decisively in favor of Iran.
- June 6: Israel invades Lebanon with 30,000 troops under the pretext of expelling the Palestine Liberation Organization (PLO). The IRGC provides support to local Shia factions, eventually leading to the creation of Lebanese Hezbollah.
- June 10: Saddam Hussein unilaterally declares a ceasefire and offers a complete withdrawal of Iraqi forces from Iranian territory. The Iranian government rejects the offer and demands the ouster of Saddam's regime, war reparations, and the opening of Iraqi territory for Iranian troops to march against Israel.
- June 11: Vladimir Kuzichkin, a KGB major responsible for managing the Tudeh Party and conveying Soviet directives, defects to the United Kingdom. He provides MI6 with the complete network of KGB operatives inside Iran and the Tudeh Party's secret contingency plan to assassinate Khomeini and seize power.
- July 13: Operation Ramadan begins. Marking one of the largest human wave attack since World War II, Iranian forces launch an invasion into Iraqi territory.
- September 15: Sadegh Ghotbzadeh is executed by firing squad. His death symbolizes the final purging of the liberal technocrats that had originally contributed to the revolution.
- December 10: The first election for the Assembly of Experts is held.
- December 15: Ayatollah Khomeini issues an eight-point command. The decree restricts extrajudicial arrests and house searches while emphasizing Islamic legality and the protection of private property, signaling that the regime has entered a phase of institutional stabilization.
- Late Autumn–End of the Year: The CIA, having obtained Kuzichkin's intelligence from MI6, shares it with Iran in an effort to rebuild relations following the resolution of the hostage crisis and keep Iran within the anti-communist bloc. This intelligence channel later leads to the Iran–Contra affair.

=== 1983 ===
- January 9: Massoud Rajavi meets Tariq Aziz, initiating the MEK's collusion with Saddam Hussein's regime.
- February 6: At dawn, the Revolutionary Guards launch a massive crackdown, arresting over 10,000 Tudeh Party leaders, members, and supporters, including Secretary-General Noureddin Kianouri. The Tudeh Party is officially dissolved, leaving the Islamic Republican Party as the sole functioning political party in Iran.
- April 30: Noureddin Kianouri makes a televised confession, tearfully admitting that his party had acted as Soviet spies and traitors since 1945. From May to October, members of the Tudeh leadership are consecutively paraded on state television to confess to espionage and praise the superiority of the Islamic theocracy.
- August 10: Flogging is introduced for more than 148 categories of offenses, including alcohol consumption, adultery, theft, fraud, and failure to wear the hijab.
- September 2: Komala, Sahand, and remaining Peykar members merge to establish the Communist Party of Iran.

== See also ==
- Fajr decade
- Anniversary of the Islamic Revolution
