= Islamic government =

Islamic government may refer to:

- A form of government practised by states which call themselves Islamic republics.
  - Caliphate
  - Islamic democracy
  - Sharia Law.
- An Islamic state
- The book Islamic Government: Governance of the Jurist, by Ayatollah Ruhollah Khomeini of Iran
