= Richard Cottam =

- Born: 1 October 1924; Provo, Utah, US
- Died: 29 August 1997 (aged 72); Pittsburgh, Pennsylvania, US
- Other name: Dick Cottam
- Education: University of Utah; Harvard University
- Spouse: Patricia Cottam
- Children: 2 daughters and 2 sons
- Espionage activity
- Country: United States
- Agency: Central Intelligence Agency
- Service years: 1953–1958
- Military career
- Branch: United States Navy
- Service years: 1941–1948
- Conflicts: World War II
- Scientific career
- Workplaces: University of Pittsburgh
- Thesis: Iran: A Case Study of Nationalism (1954)
- Doctoral advisor: Rupert Emerson
- Other academic advisors: Richard N. Frye

Richard W. Cottam (1924–1997) was an American political scientist, Iranist and a Central Intelligence Agency (CIA) operative in Iran.

Cottam was a member of the Church of Jesus Christ of Latter-day Saints and served a mission for the Church. He was in the United States Navy during World War II.
