= Two-tiered pricing =

Two-tiered pricing refers to a system under which commodities for domestic use are supported at one level and those for export markets at another, lower level.

In the United States, the peanut price support program, until policy changes made by the 2002 farm bill (P.L. 101-171, Section 1301-1310), used a two-tiered pricing system with a higher level of support for “quota peanuts” that could be sold domestically as edible peanuts and a lower level of support for “additional peanuts” that only could be exported or crushed if that stayed in the United States. In Japan, two-tiered pricing has been proposed as a way of managing the tourism industry.
