= Khomeini's 8-article command =

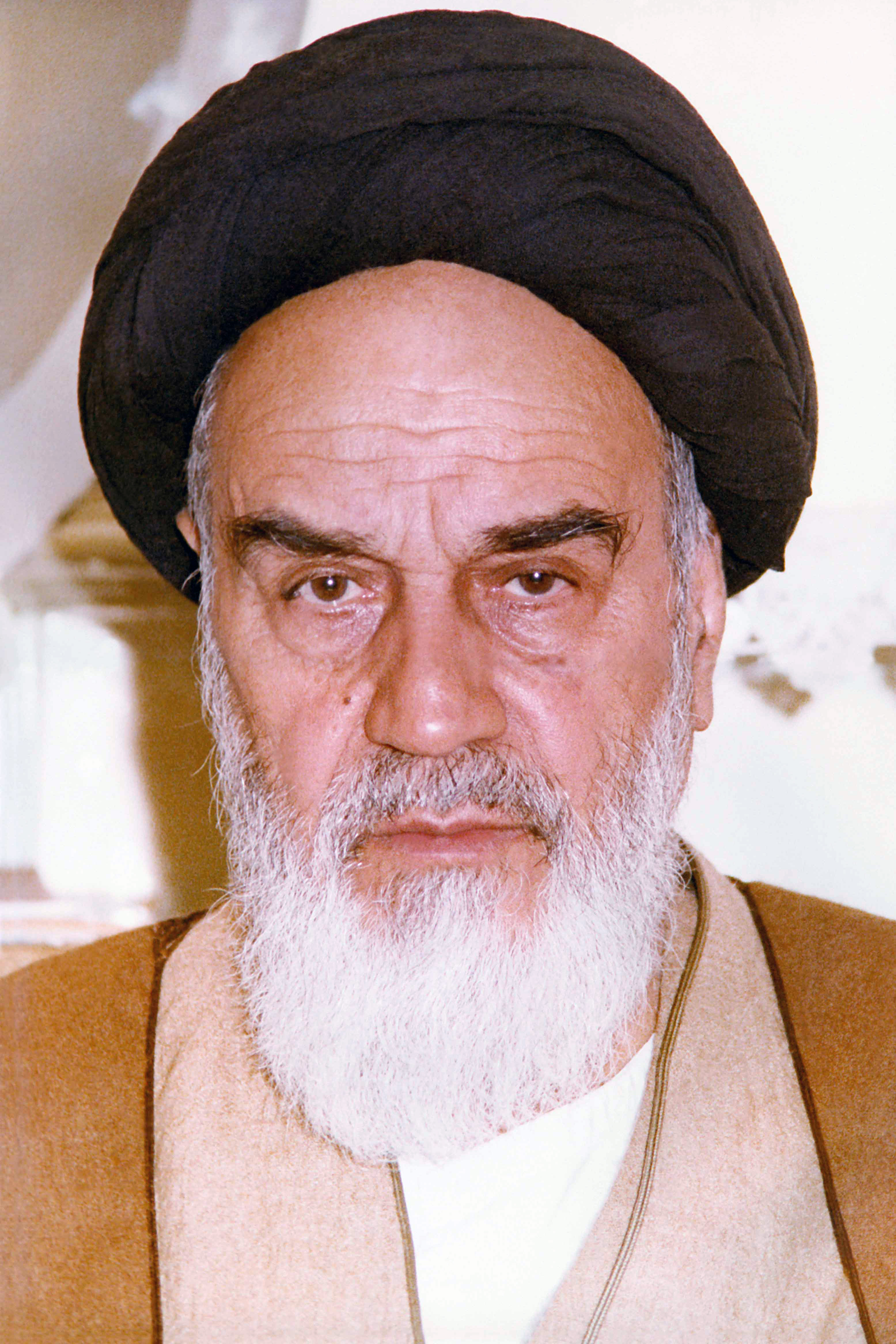
Iran's first/former supreme leader of Iran, who issued a "8-article command" in 1982

Khomeini's 8-article command (Persian: فرمان هشت ماده‌ای خمینی), is an issued 8-article command by Iran's Supreme leader, Seyyed Ruhollah Khomeini; addressing to Judicial system of Iran and executive organizations of the country, on 15 December 1982—in order to make the laws based on Islam's orders.

This command is considered among the known works of Seyyed Ruhollah Khamenei in the field(s) of "private rights", "human rights" and "civil rights" versus "government and power". This 8-article command is also known as "Manshur-e Keramet-e Ensan" ("Charter of Human Dignity"), and emphasizes all items in respecting the rights of people and observance of legal rules in dealing with Sharia-civil rights.

== See also ==
- Supreme leader of Iran
- Supreme Court of Iran
- Judicial system of Iran
- Legislature of Iran
