= Iranian Revolution conspiracy theory =

Iranian Revolution conspiracy theory may refer to:

- Jimmy Carter's engagement with Khomeini
- British–Ruhollah Khomeini conspiracy theory
