= Ruhollah Khomeini's return to Iran =

1979 return of Iranian religious leader

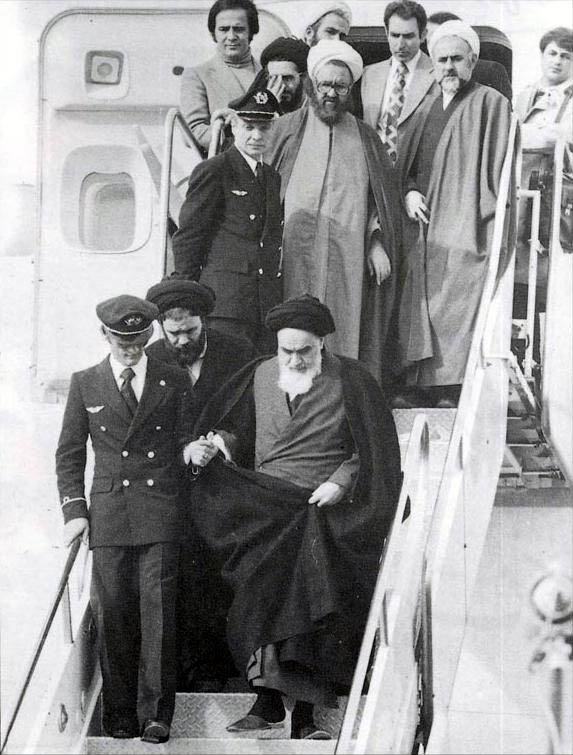
Arrival of Khomeini on 1 February 1979 at Mehrabad International Airport in Tehran, escorted by an Air France pilot

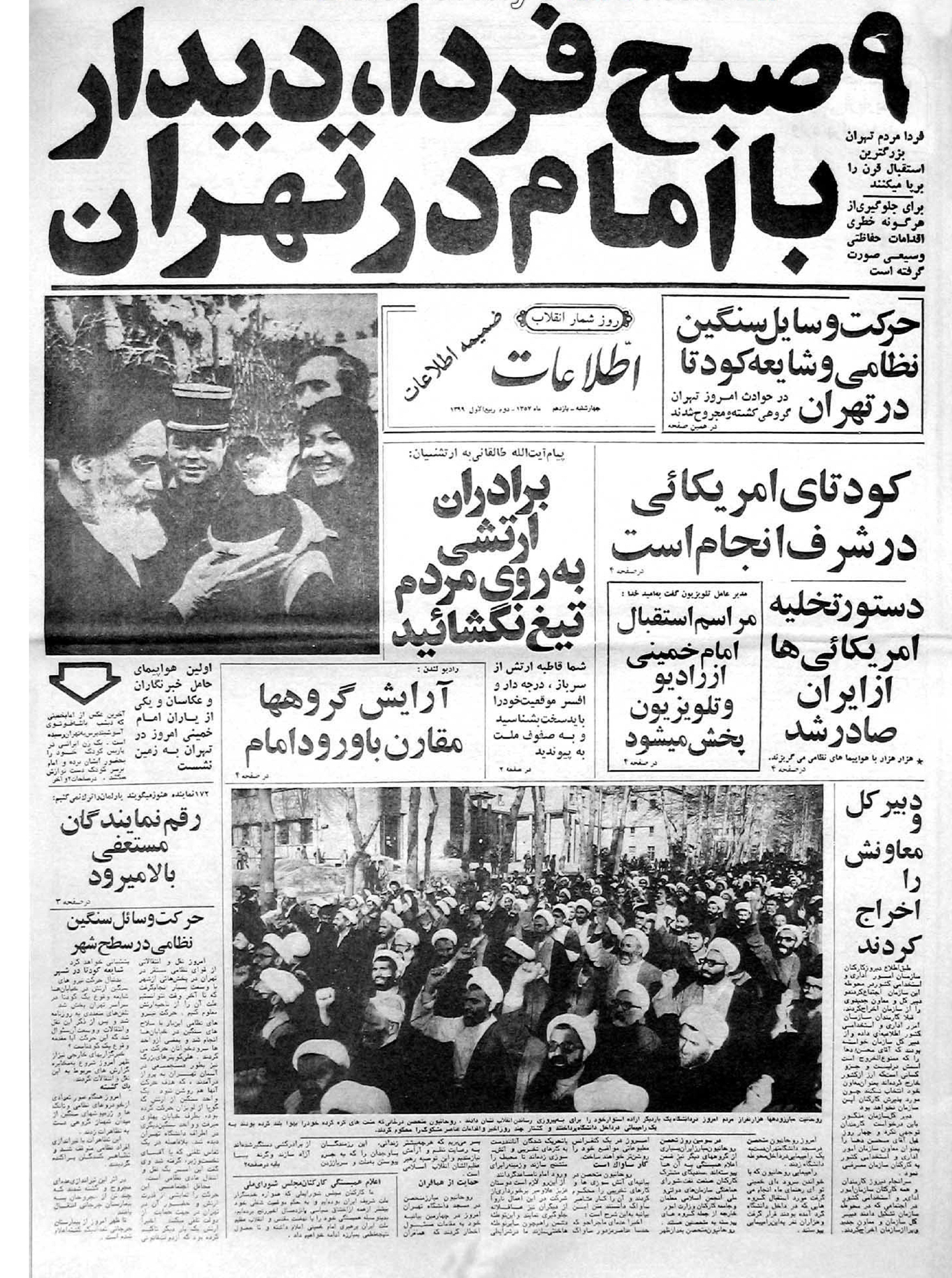
Ettela'at Newspaper titling Tomorrow Morning at 9, Meeting with the Imam (Khomeini) in Tehran.

Ruhollah Khomeini's return to Iran on 1 February 1979, after 14 years in exile, was an important event in the Iranian Revolution. It led to the collapse of the provisional government of Shapour Bakhtiar and the final overthrow of the Shah of Iran, Mohammad Reza Pahlavi, on 11 February 1979.

Ruhollah Khomeini, known in the Western world as Ayatollah Khomeini, was an Iranian Shia Muslim religious leader, philosopher, revolutionary and politician. Prior to his exile, Khomeini had been a prominent opponent of the Shah. Upon his return, he was greeted by crowds of millions, and within 10 days the revolution would be successful. Following the revolution, Khomeini became the country's Supreme Leader, a position created in the Constitution of the Islamic Republic of Iran as the highest-ranking political and religious authority of the nation, which he held until his death. Khomeini's return and the 10 days following are now celebrated in Iran as the Fajr decade.

== Exile ==
In the early 1960s, Khomeini found the arena of leadership open following the deaths of Ayatollah Sayyed Husayn Borujerdi (1961), the leading, although quiescent, Shi'ah religious leader; and Ayatollah Abol-Ghasem Kashani (1962), an activist cleric. The clerical class had been on the defensive ever since the 1920s, when the secular, anti-clerical modernizer Reza Shah Pahlavi rose to power. Reza's son Mohammad Reza Shah, instituted a "White Revolution", which was a further challenge to the Ulama. Khomeini was arrested and was exiled from Iran for opposing the Shah's actions (Iran's ruling system). Khomeini was a marja ("source of emulation") in Twelver Shia Islam, a Mujtahid or faqih but he is primarily known for his political activities. He spent more than 15 years in exile for his opposition to the last Shah, mostly in the holy Shia city of Najaf, Iraq. At first, he was sent to Bursa, Turkey on 4 November 1964, where he stayed in this city hosted by a colonel in the Turkish Military Intelligence named Ali Cetiner in his own residence. In October 1965, after almost eleven months, he moved to Najaf, Iraq, where he stayed until 1978, when he was encouraged to leave by then-Vice President Saddam Hussein.

== Preparing for travel ==
Khomeini decided to return to Iran after Mohammad Reza Pahlavi, the Shah of Iran, left on 16 January 1979. A welcoming committee was formed on 21 January 1979, to organise and ensure Khomeini's return. Kayhan and Ettela'at papers announced that Khomeini would soon return. The news led to the flow of millions of people from different cities to Tehran.

It was originally planned that Ayatollah Khomeini would enter Iran on 26 January, but Prime Minister Shapour Bakhtiar announced that the airports would be closed. From Paris Khomeini declared that he would return as soon as the airports were reopened. The closure of the airports led to widespread protests and strikes. In Tehran alone 28 people were killed. On 29 January, the airport was reopened on the orders of Bakhtiar and Khomeini stated a new return date of 1 February.

== The flight ==
Video of the descent of Ayatollah Khomeini from the airplane stairs

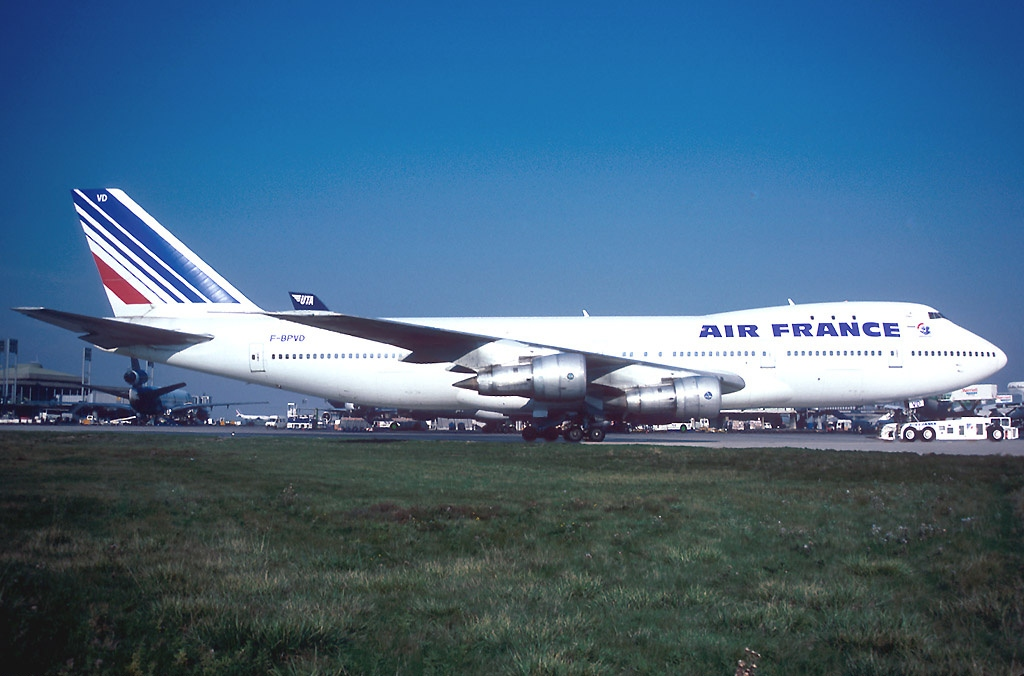
F-BPVD, the Boeing 747-100 used for the flight

On 1 February, Khomeini flew to Iran in a chartered Air France Boeing 747-100 (registered F-BPVD) as flight AF 4721 from Charles de Gaulle Airport. He was accompanied by supporters including Sadeq Tabatabaei, Sadegh Khalkhali as well as 120 international journalists including Peter Scholl-Latour. The presence of journalists was in part to ensure the safety of the plane from being attacked.

Journalist Peter Jennings asked Ayatollah Khomeini how he felt about returning to Iran after fifteen years. Khomeini answered "Nothing" (Persian: هیچی, romanized: Hichi). Khomeini's statement attracted much attention, and its meaning has been heavily disputed. Some of Khomeini's critics have claimed his response demonstrated apathy towards Iran and its people. Others have interpreted his response as inspired by Ibn Arabi's philosophy of the Perfect Man, and Shia mysticism, arguing that Khomeini was attempting to reach a perfect emotionless state, like that of the Mahdi.

== Arrival and visit to Behesht-e Zahra ==
At 9:30 am on 1 February 1979, Khomeini arrived in Iran and received a welcome from millions of Iranians. After delivering a speech at the Mehrabad International Airport, he traveled to the Behesht-e Zahra cemetery, where many people who were killed during the revolution were buried. Millions of supporters lined the path cheering his name, and hundreds of thousands gathered at the cemetery to listen his speech. Khomeini declared that Shapour Bakhtiar's cabinet was illegal and he said he would appoint his own. He declared: "I will appoint the government! I will strike the present government on the mouth! With the support of the people, I will appoint the government! I will do this, because the people approved me!"

== Government collapse ==
On 5 February, Ayatollah Khomeini chose Mehdi Bazargan as Prime Minister of the interim government.

On 8 February, the Iranian Air Force officers went to Khomeini's home and promised their loyalty to the revolution. On 10 February, Bakhtiar's government announced a curfew that Ruhollah Khomeini urged people to disregard. Revolutionaries subjugated police stations, prisons and governmental centers. On 11 February, senior military commanders announced that they were neutral in the conflict between Bakhtiar's government and the revolutionaries. Because of this, they pulled their troops from the streets. Bakhtiar resigned and went to Paris. Revolutionaries gained a victory on this day.

== See also ==
- Ruhollah Khomeini
- Jimmy Carter's engagement with Khomeini
- Iranian Revolution
- Timeline of the Iranian revolution
- Fajr decade
- Ruhollah Khomeini's life in exile
- Finland Station
