= Ettela'at Haftegy =

Iranian weekly magazines

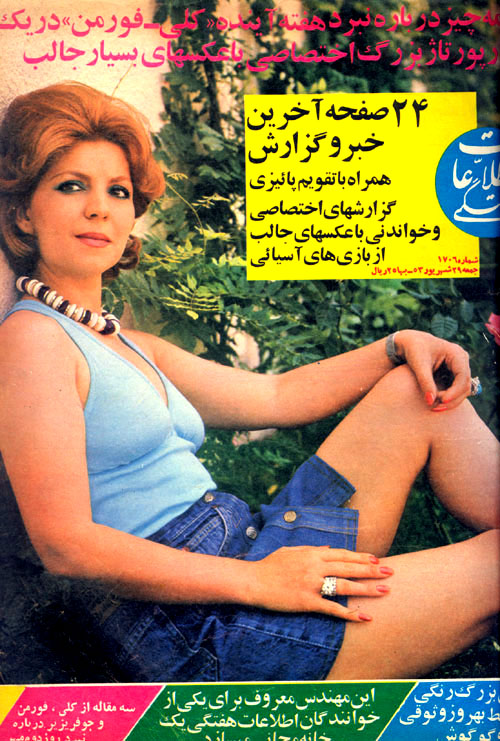
- Forouzan on the cover of the magazine, No. 1706, dated 20 September 1974
- chief editor: Fathollah Javadi
- Frequency: Weekly
- Publisher: Ettela'at
- Founder: Abbas Massoudi
- Founded: 21 March 1941
- Country: Iran
- Based in: Tehran
- Language: Persian

Ettela'at-e Haftegy (Persian: اطلاعات هفتگی; "Weekly Information") is an Iranian Persian-language nationwide tabloid weekly magazine. It was launched on 21 March 1941 in Tehran, and it's published on paper and electronically. The chief editor of this magazine is Fathollah Javadi, and its founder was Abbas Massoudi who had previously founded the daily newspaper Ettela'at in 1926.
