= Anniversary of the Iranian Revolution =

Annual anniversary of the 1979 Iranian Revolution

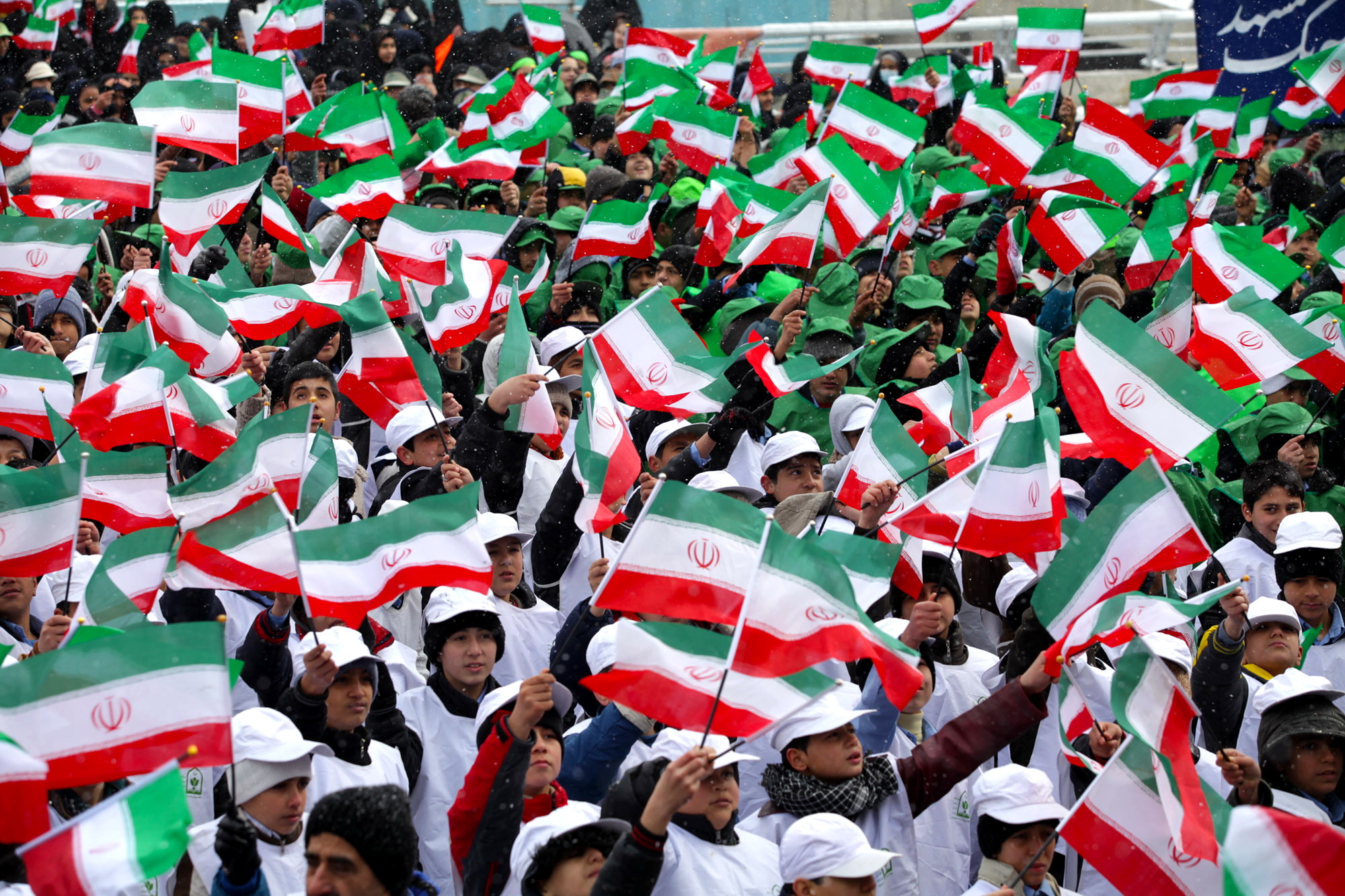
People celebrating anniversary of the revolution in Mashhad in 2014

The Anniversary of the Islamic Revolution (Persian: راهپیمایی ۲۲ بهمن) is a date celebrated in Iran on 22 Bahman, the 11th month in the Iranian calendar, equivalent to 11 February in the Gregorian calendar.

It commemorates the culmination of the protests that led to the downfall of the Pahlavi dynasty and the establishment of a revolutionary state. The anniversary is held on the last day of the Fajr decade, a ten-day celebration of Ruhollah Khomeini's return to Iran.

== Background ==
On 16 January 1979, Shah Mohammad Reza Pahlavi left Iran amidst large protests from the general populace, entrusting Shapour Bakhtiar with the position of prime minister to establish a secular civilian administration. Khomeini, meanwhile, entered Tehran from France on 1 February 1979, after nearly 15 years in exile.

By 11 February 1979, after ten days of an intense uprising led by Khomeini, the Iranian Army announced that it would remain neutral in conflicts between revolutionaries and guardians of the government left in place by the Shah. Bakhtiar, rendered powerless, resigned the same day the army announced its decision, thus ending the Iranian monarchy. Khomeini assumed power as Supreme Leader and instructed the swift formation of an Islamic republic.

== Original event ==
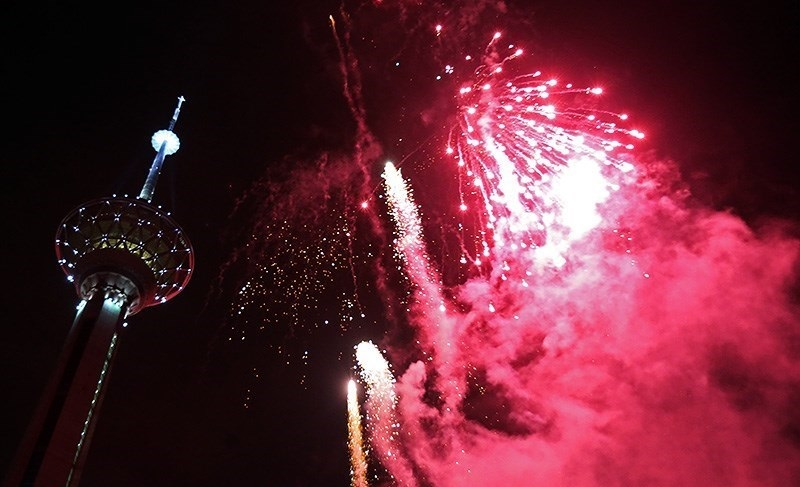
Fireworks in Tehran for celebrating the revolution anniversary

On 11 February 1979, upon the end of the revolution, hundreds of military personnel and policemen marched toward the Shahyad Tower (now Azadi). One of their demands was to reduce dependence on the United States and the Soviet Union, dominant powers of that time.

== Tehran (march) ==
Every year in Tehran, the capital of Iran, marchers march from ten different points (known as the ten routes) to Azadi Square, where the Iranian president typically delivers a speech on the anniversary of the revolution.

== Protests ==
The Anniversary of the Iranian Revolution is used by critics of the Iranian government as a day of protest.

== Annual pardons ==
It has been an common annual practice in Iran to grant pardons or sentence reductions to prısoners on the anniversary of the Iranian Revolution. In 2026, chief judiciary, Gholamhossein Mohseni Ejei stated that detained individuals who had participated in the 2025-2026 Iranian protests would be removed from the list of pardons.

== Timeline ==
=== In 2026 ===
It has been claimed by Iranian state-run news agencies that 23 to 26 million people participated in the anniversary of the Iranian Revolution in 2026 (in 1400 districts, cities and towns). However, independent verification of these figures has not been provided. Furthermore, many Iranians challenged the authenticity of the figures and broadcasts. Days prior, images and videos from the pro-government rallies during the 2025–2026 Iranian protests were reported to have been altered.

One picture posted by the iranian Foreign Minister on X for instance, shows what appears to be a naked man standing with a massive crowd of protestors, indicating an AI generated picture.

== Gallery ==
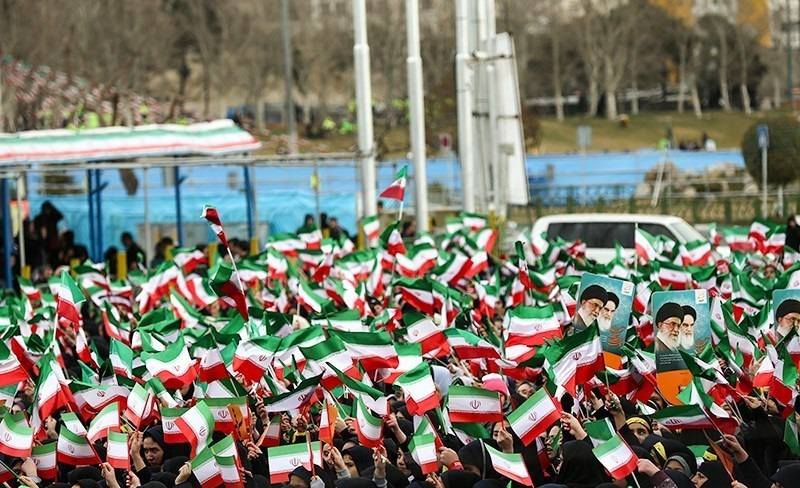

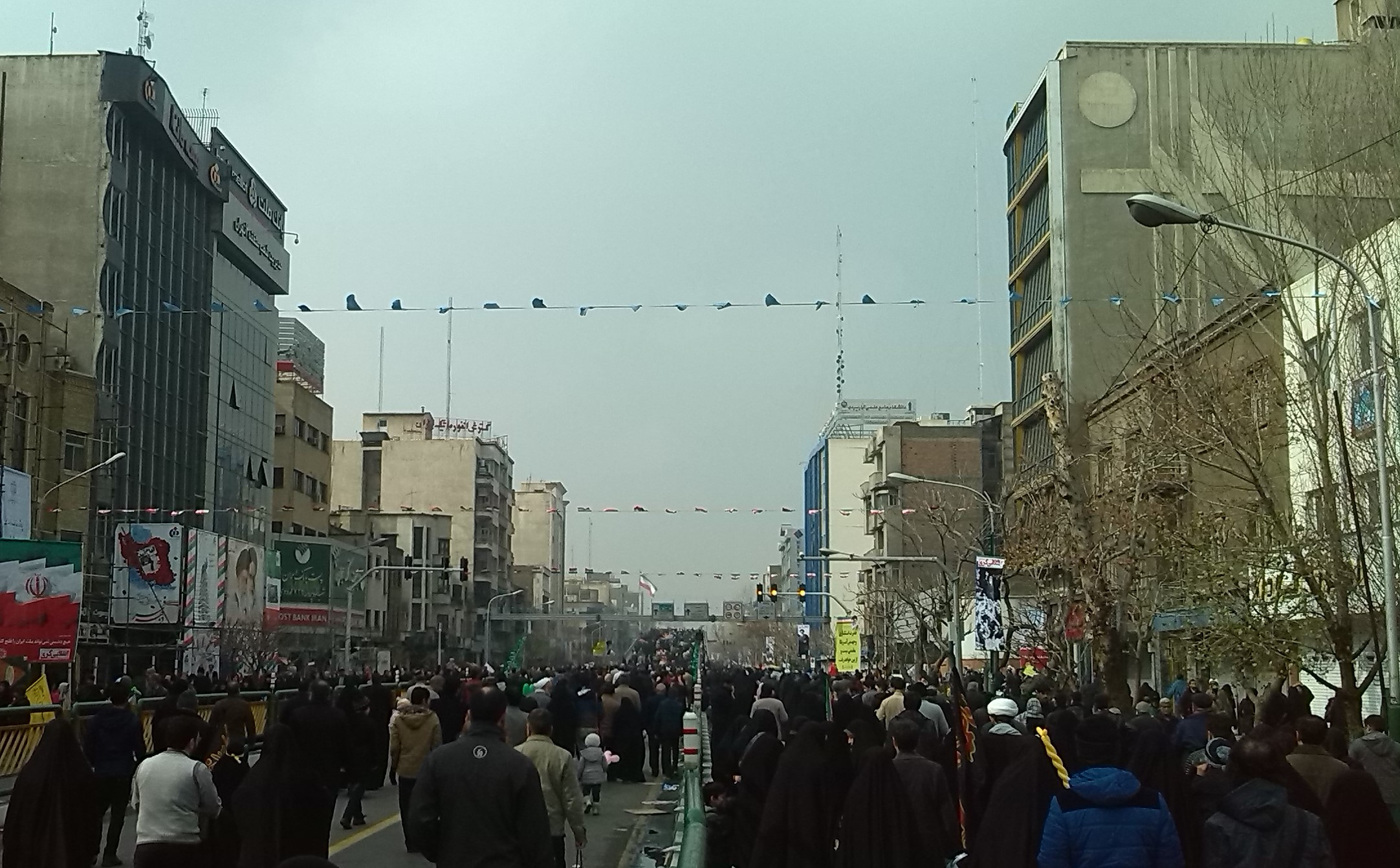

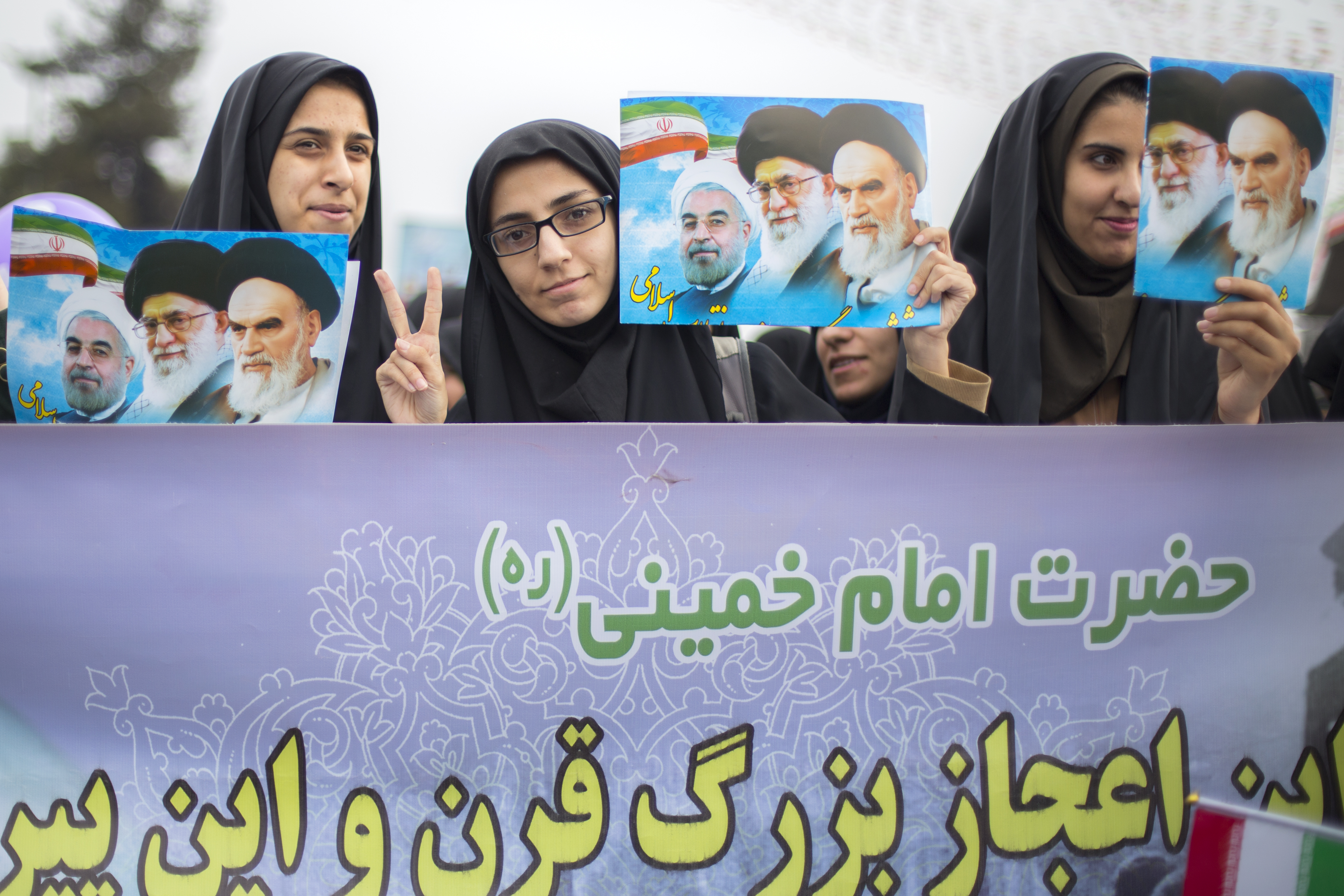

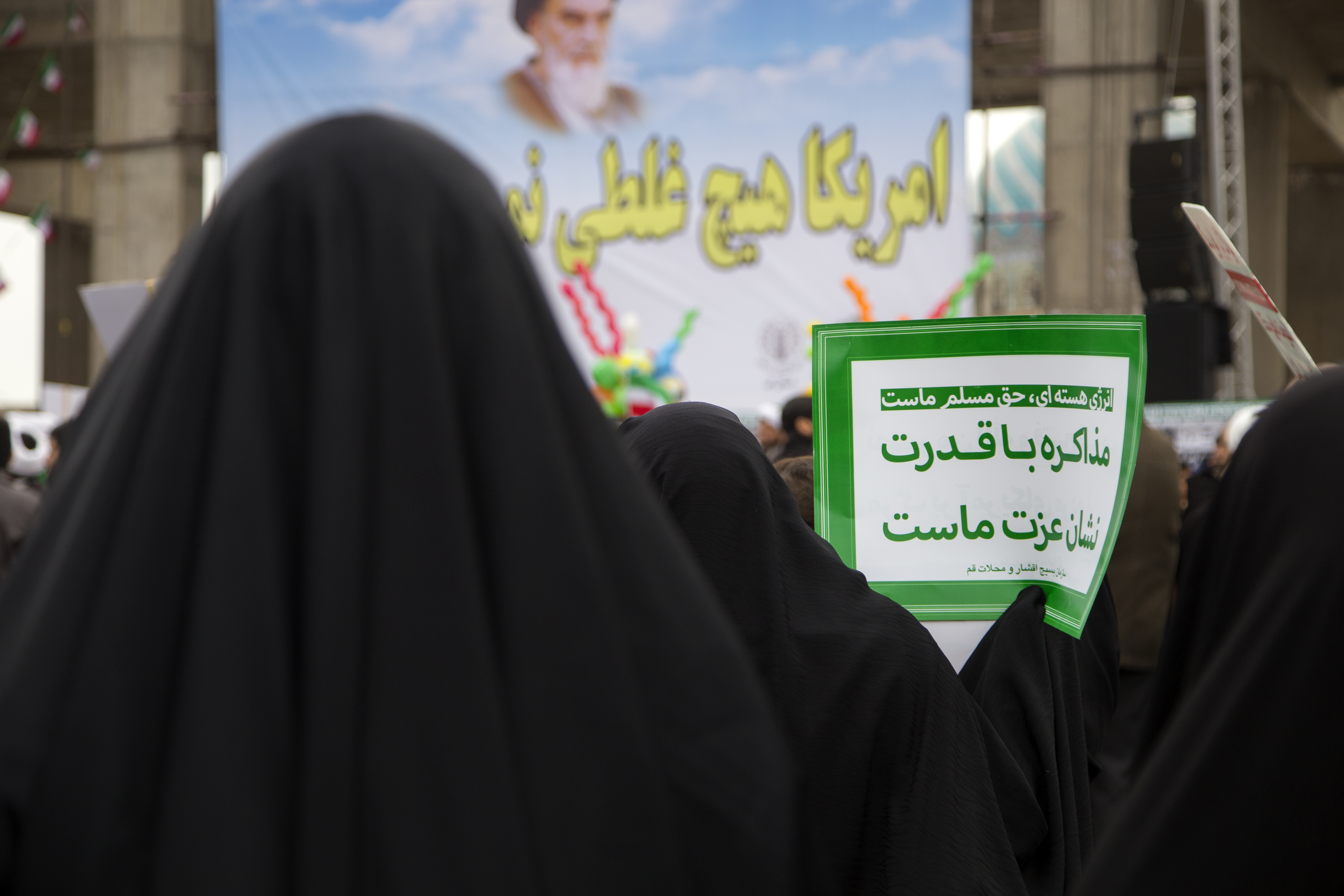

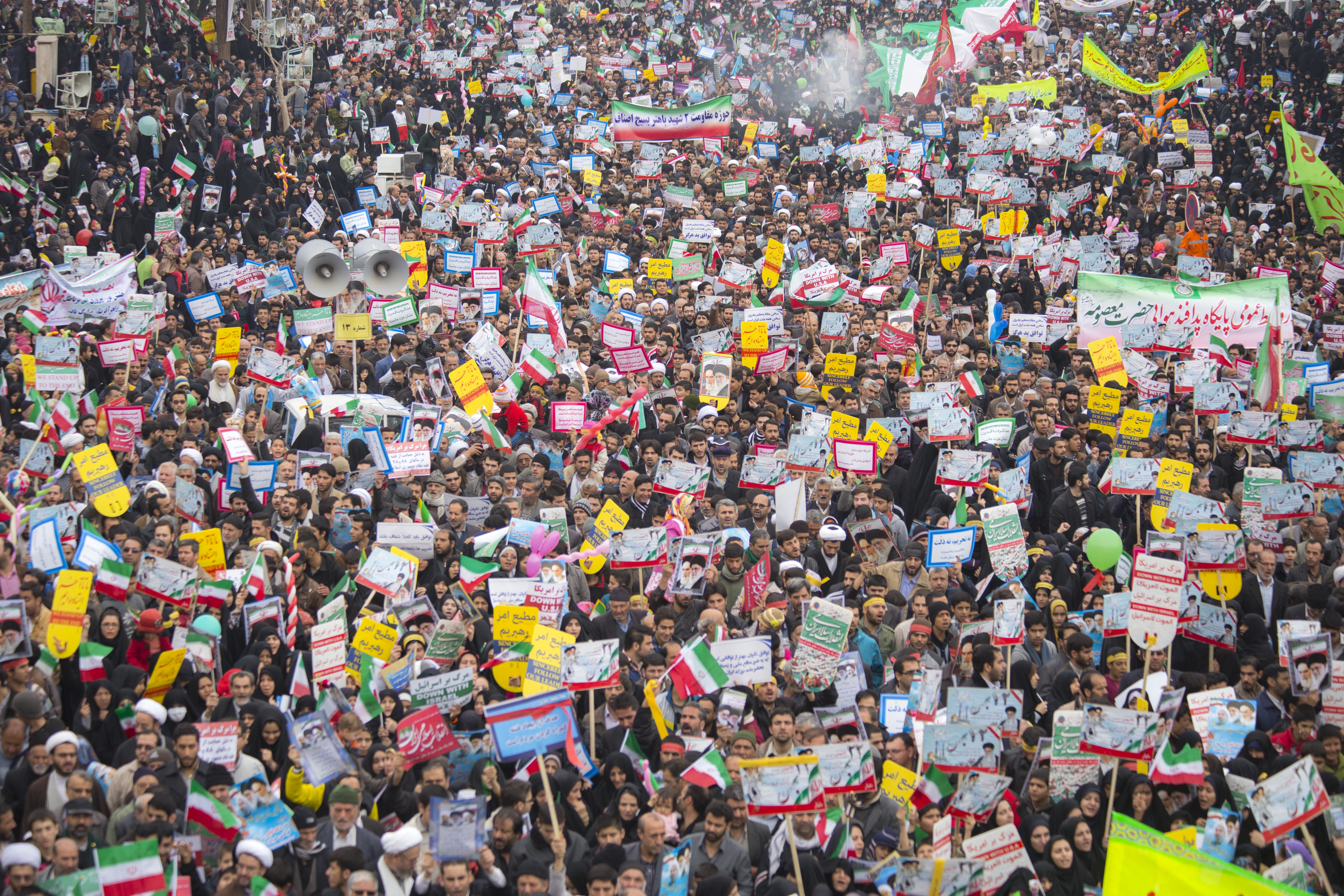

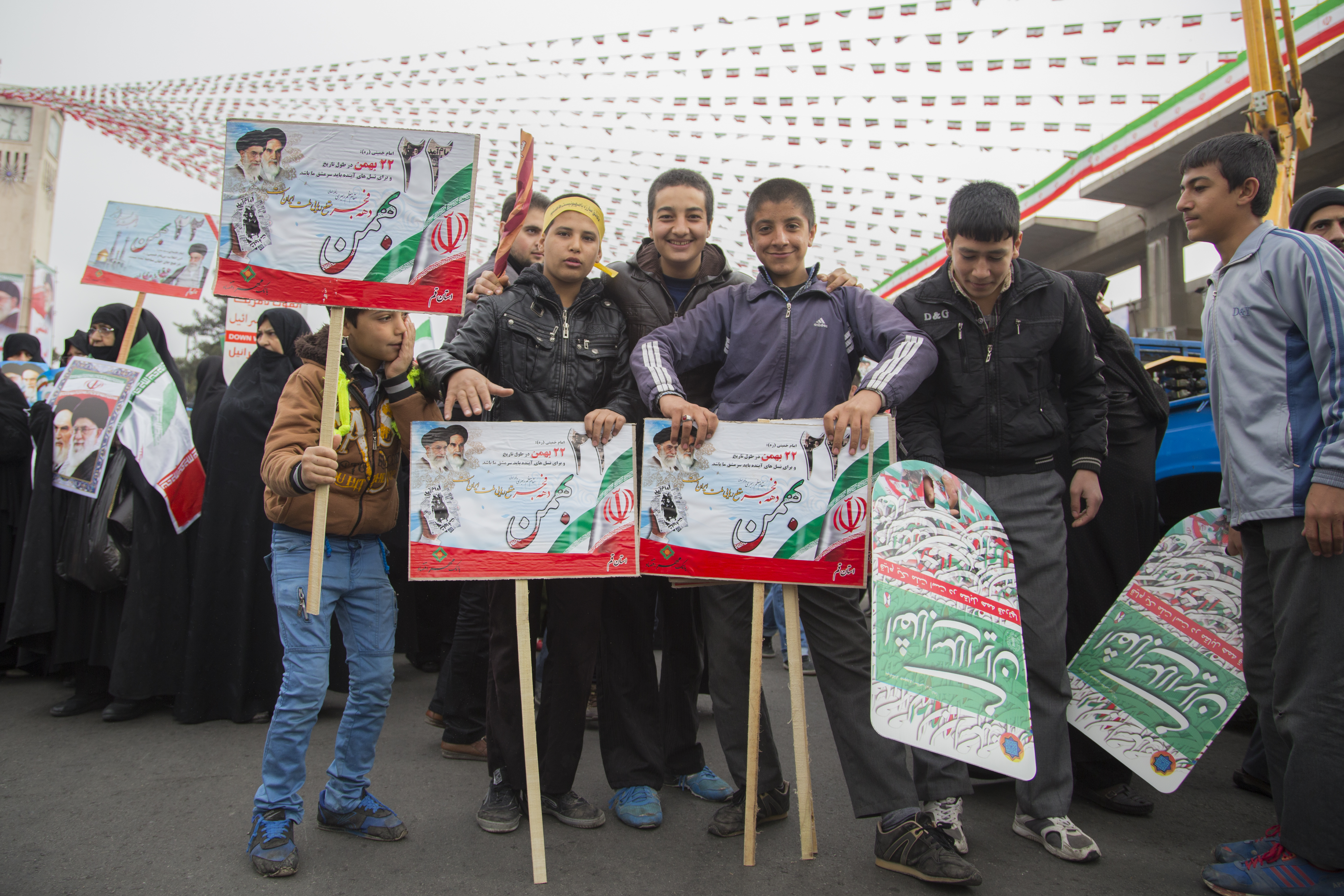

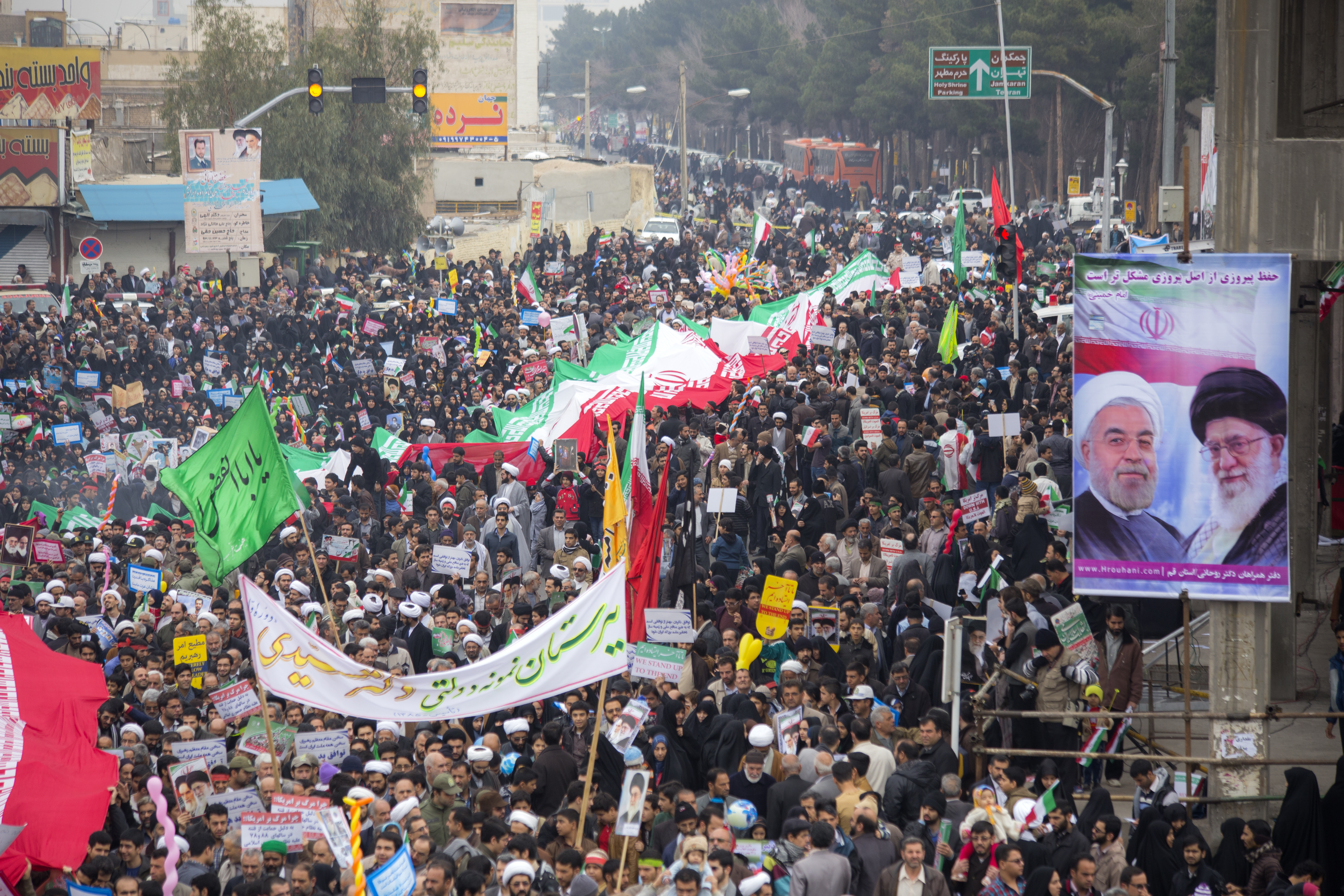

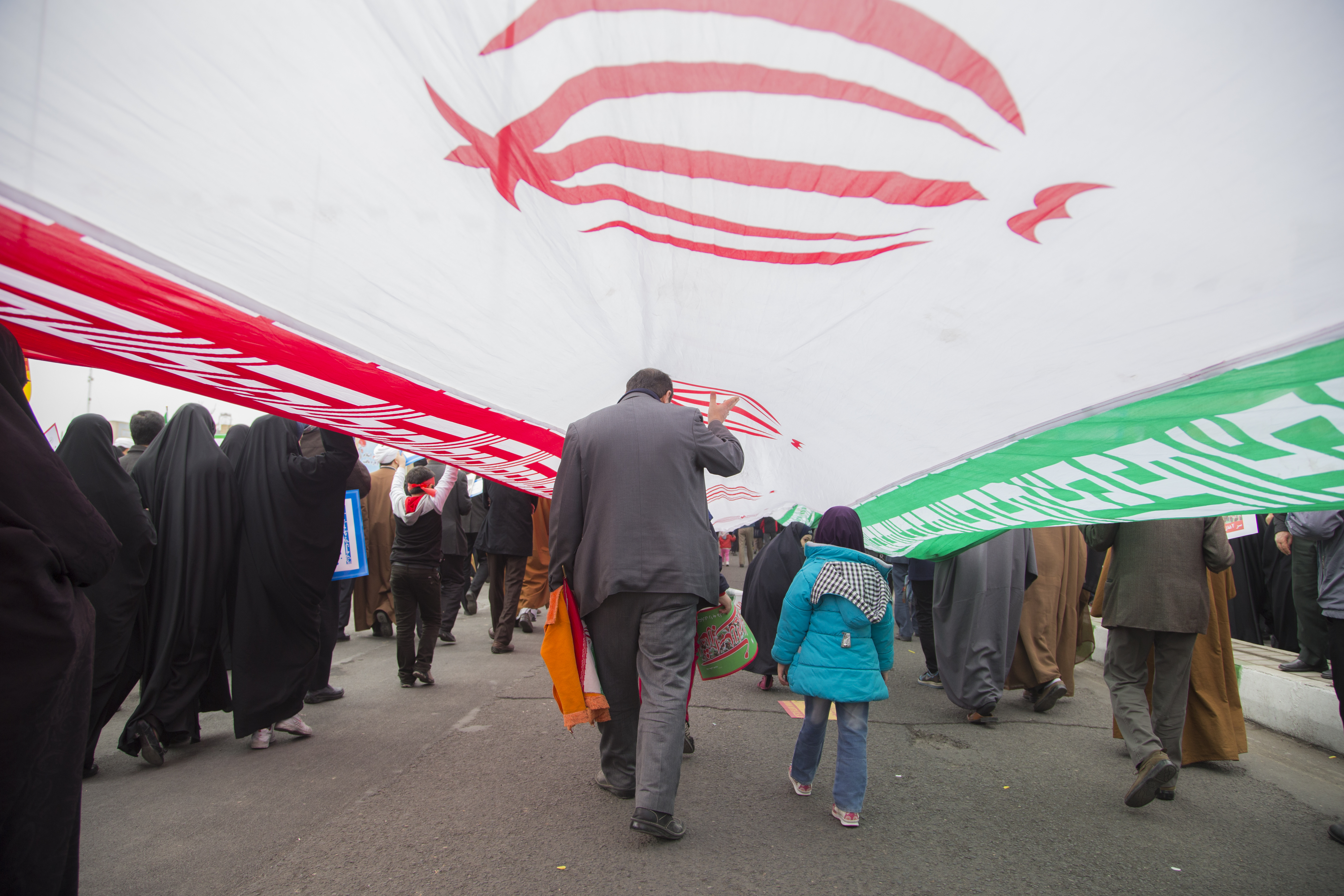

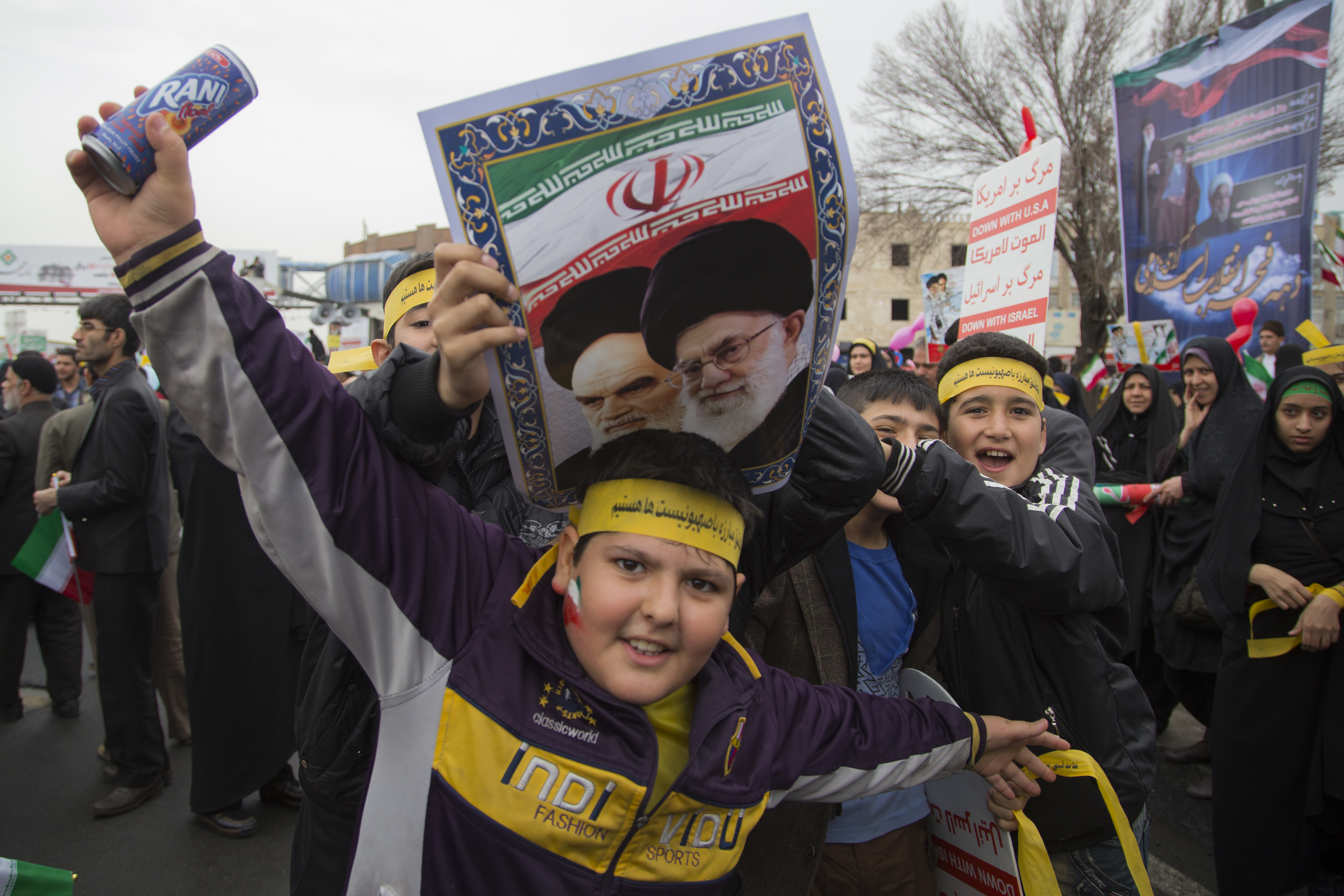

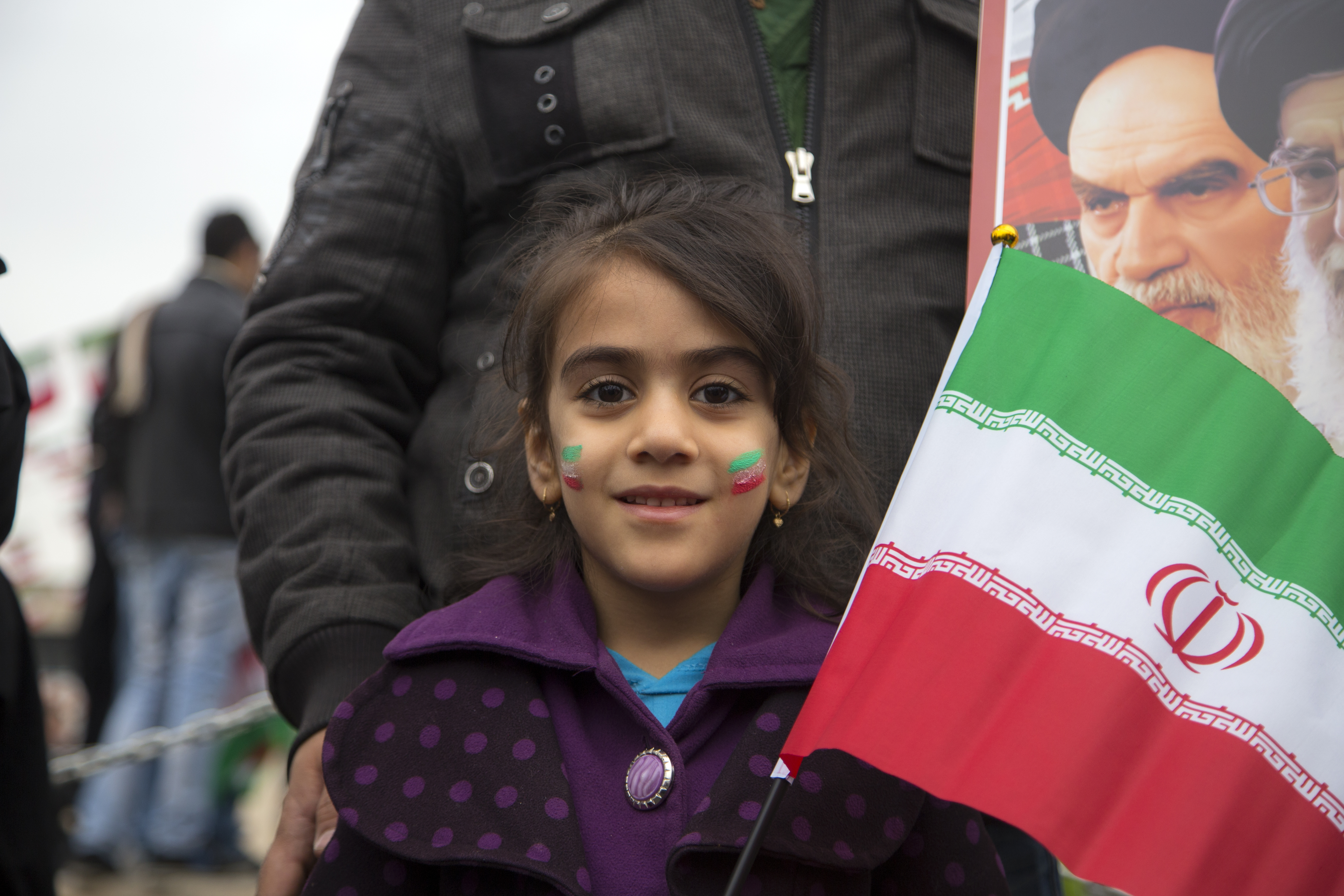

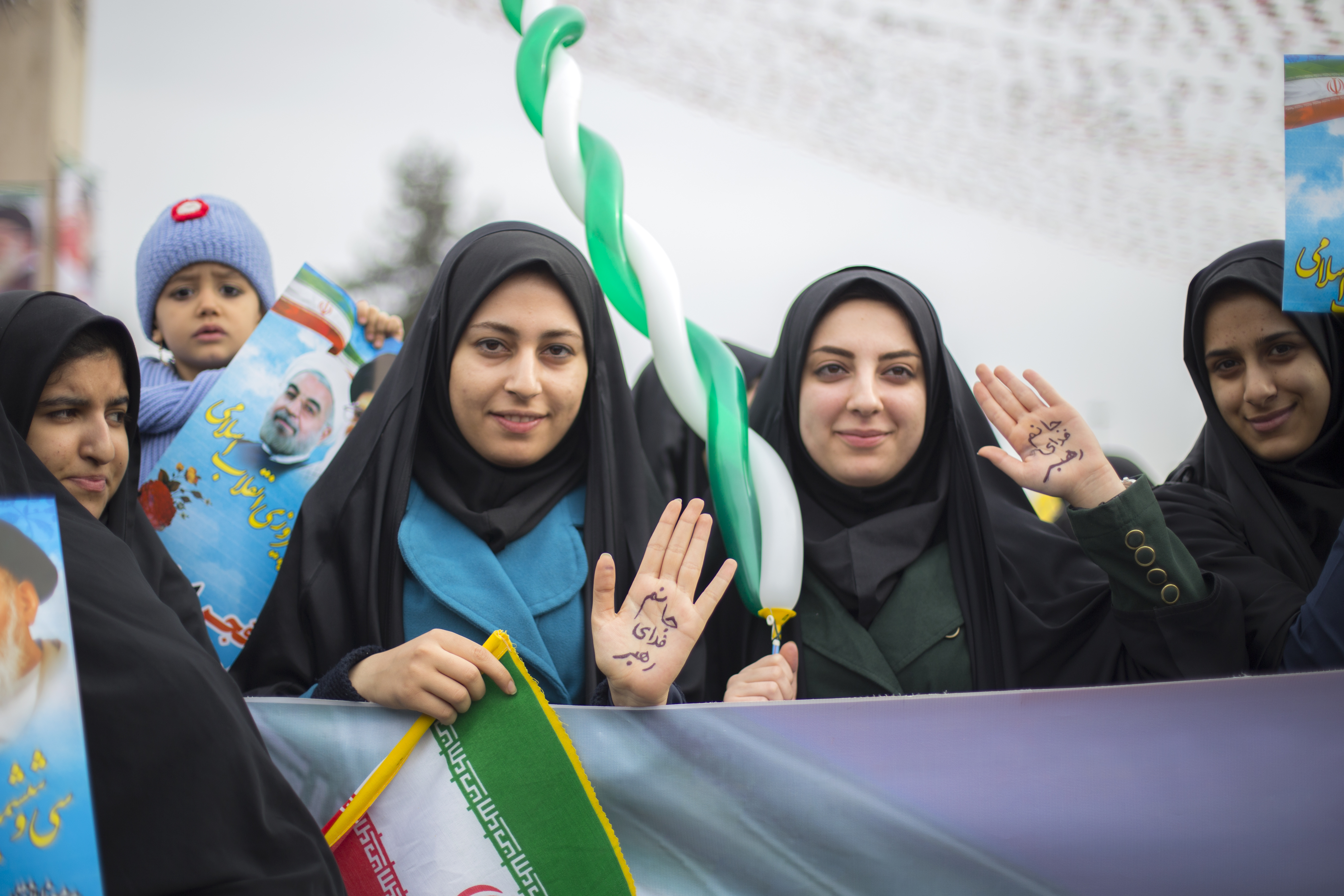

== See also ==
- Timeline of the Iranian revolution
- Fajr decade
