= Homafaran Allegiance =

1979 photograph by Abdol-Hussein Partovi

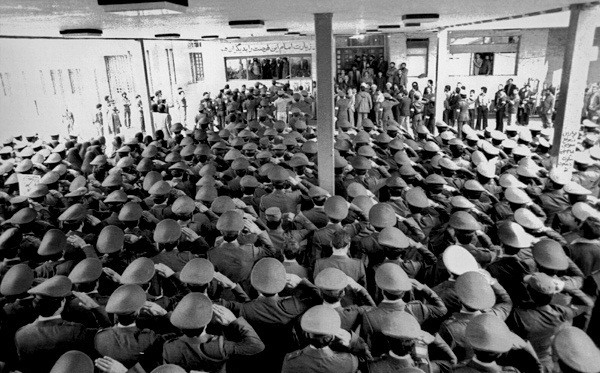
The photo of the Homafaran giving a military salute to Ruhollah Khomeini

Homafaran Allegiance (Persian: بیعت همافران) is a historical photo that was captured by Abdol-Hussein Partovi on 7 February 1979 at the Alavi School, Ruhollah Khomeini's residence after he returned from exile in France. The photo shows the Homafaran, officers of the Imperial Iranian Air Force, saluting Khomeini (who can be seen in the distance). On 8 February, the photo was published on the front page of the Kayhan daily.

The photo is important in two aspects: first, for its publication days before the Iranian Revolution collapsed the Shah's government, and second, that it is the only known image of this meeting. To avoid detection from the Homafaran, the picture was taken from behind.

Since 2000, the original version of this photo has been available at the Cultural-Art Institution in Tehran.

== Reactions ==
Then-Prime Minister Shapour Bakhtiar claimed that the photo was staged. According to Air Force commander documents and Bakhtiar's speech, Army public relations denied the photo; however, Ruhollah Khomeini confirmed its authenticity. Partovi was also prosecuted. Bakhtiar's government tried to identify every officer who participated in the meeting, but was not successful.

== After the Revolution ==
Iranian Air force commanders swear their allegiance to Supreme Leader, Ali Khamenei, every 8 February.

== See also ==
- Iranian Revolution
- Fajr decade

== Gallery ==
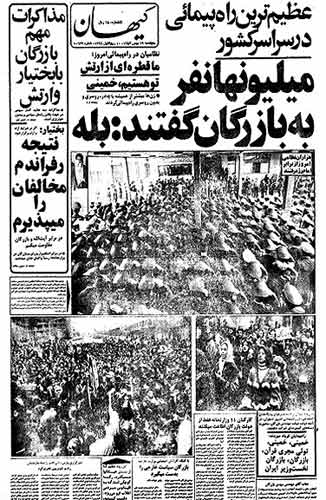
The photo appeared on the first page of Kayhan.

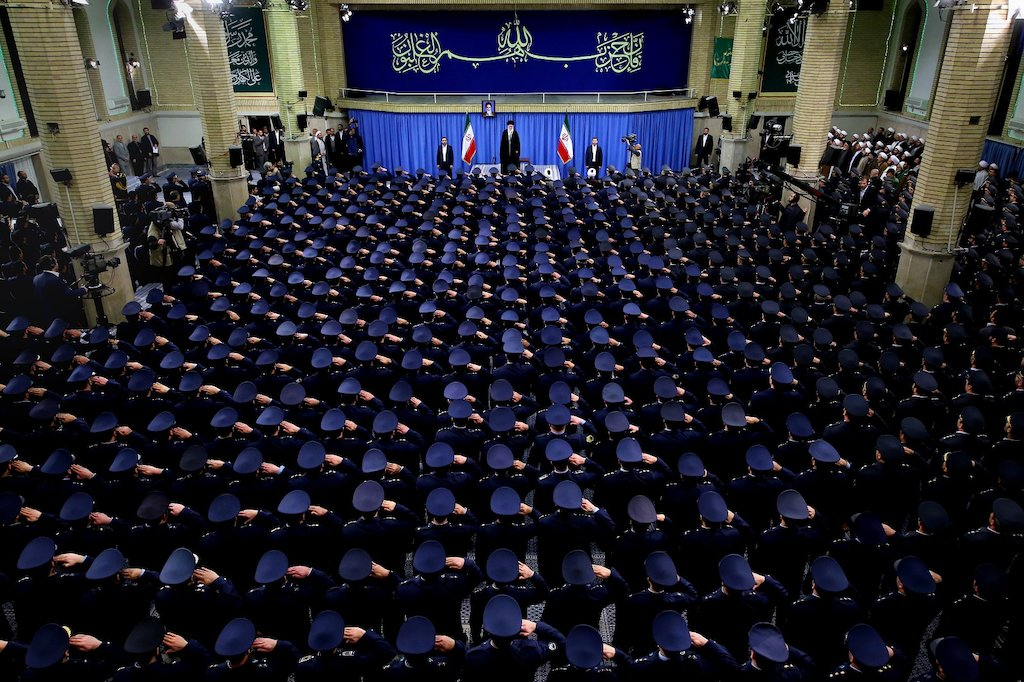
Iranian Air Force allegiance with Ali Khamenei on 8 February 2016. On the occasion of the historic pledge of allegiance of Air Force officers to Ruhollah Khomeini on 8 February 1979, the National Air Force Day in Iran, a group of commanders, officers, pilots and personnel of Iran's Air Force and Air Defense Force met second supreme leader of Iran.
