= Ramesh (singer) =

Iranian pop singer (1946–2020)

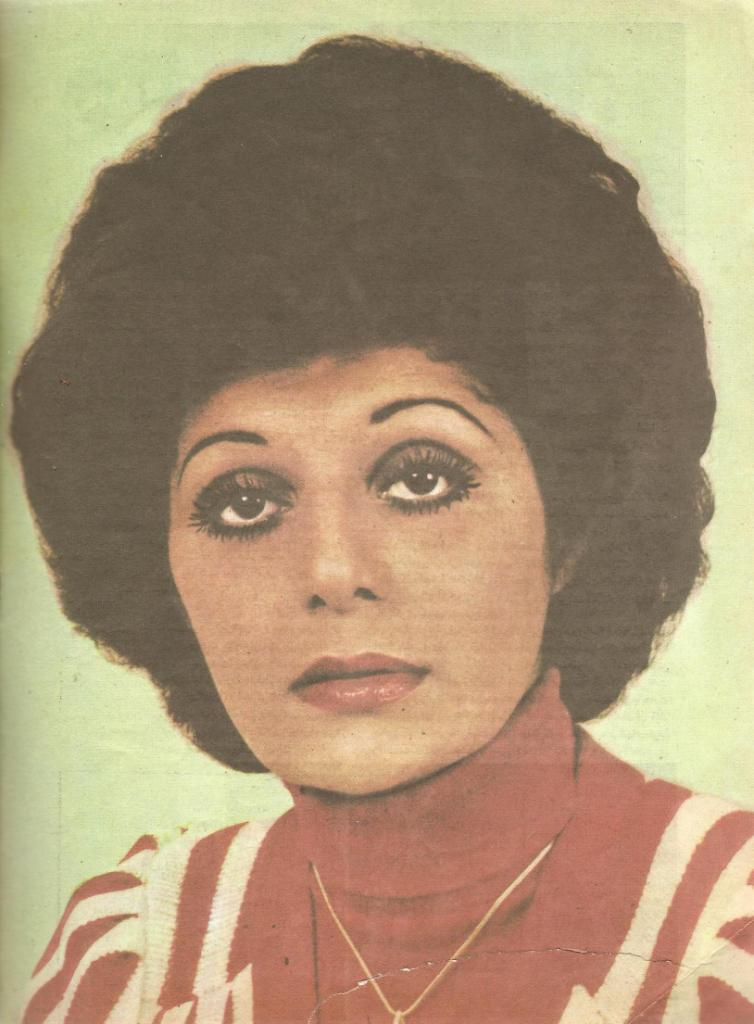

Background information
- Born: Azar Mohebbi-Tehrani; 13 November 1946; Tehran, Imperial State of Iran
- Died: 28 November 2020 (aged 74) Los Angeles, California, U.S.
- Genres: Persian traditional; Iranian pop; jazz; Iranian rock
- Instruments: Vocals; guitar
- Years active: 1964–2003
- Labels: Caltex Records; Avang Music

Azar Mohebbi-Tehrani (Persian: آذر محبی تهرانی, 13 November 1946 – 28 November 2020), better known by her stage name Ramesh (رامش), was an Iranian singer. She performed songs across a variety of genres, including pop, jazz, and rock.

== Life ==
=== Early life ===
Ramesh was born on 13 November 1946 on Pasteur Street in Tehran to a family with four children. Her father, Nasser Mohebbi-Tehrani, worked at the customs of Mehrabad Airport, and her mother was named Aghdas E'tesami. Ramesh earned a diploma in natural sciences and, with the encouragement of her father, wanted to pursue a career in medicine until she met musician Ata'ollah Khorram, after which she decided to become a singer.

=== Personal life ===
In 2015 and in an interview with Javanan magazine in Los Angeles, Ramesh stated that after the 1979 revolution she married a non-Iranian man when she moved to the UK. Her sister, Giti Mohebbi, confirmed her account by stating that she had been married to an Englishman, though the marriage ended in divorce with no children.

In September 2024, Shahram Shabpareh claimed in an interview with Kambiz Hosseini on Iran International that he married Ramesh in a bid to assist her with her move to the United States even though she was a lesbian.

=== Stage name ===
Ramesh's stage name was chosen for her by musician Dawud Pirnia, as there was another artist named Azar active on stage at the time.

== Career ==
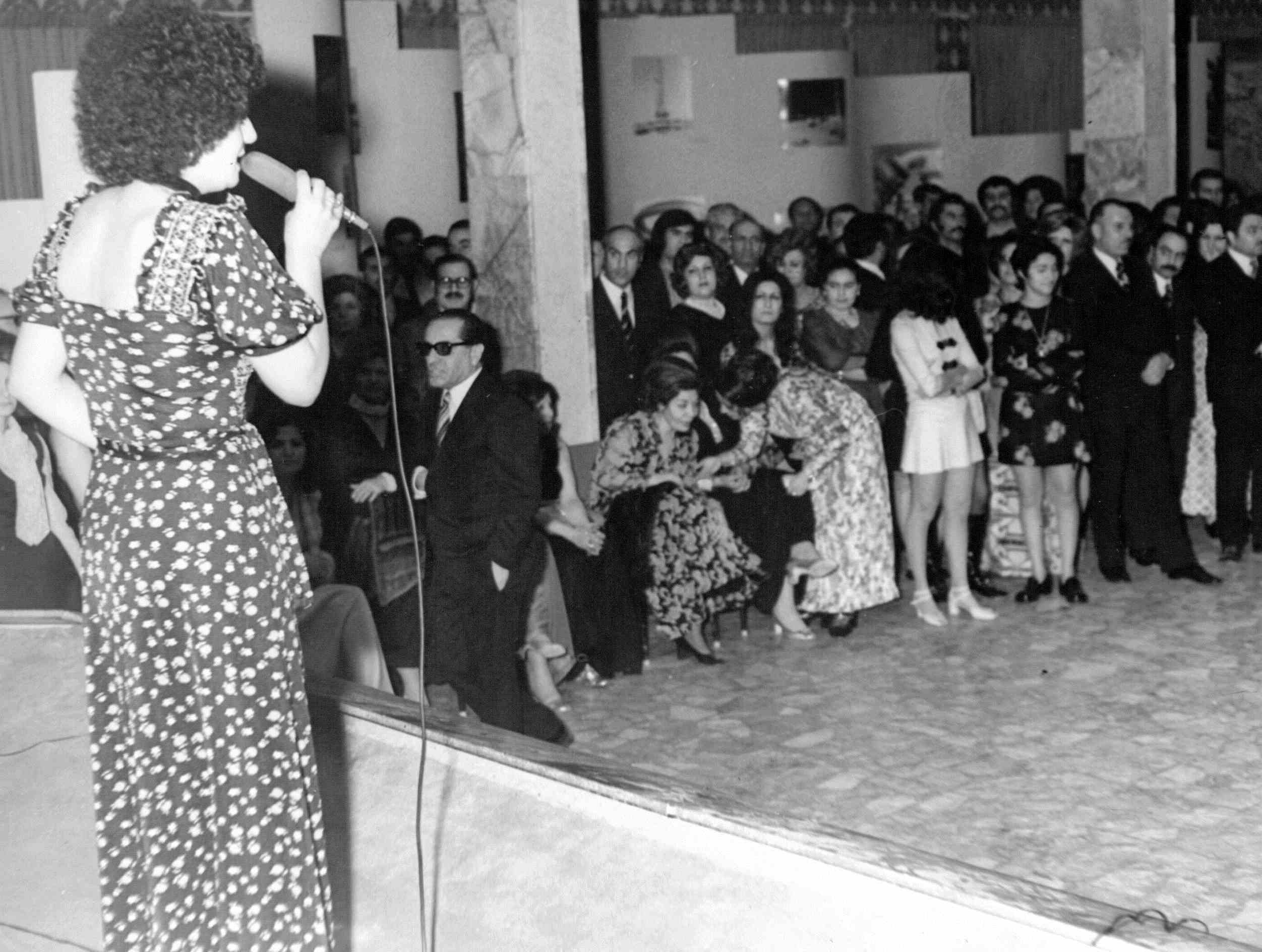
Ramesh performing for the Community of Press and Printing Houses in Kermanshah

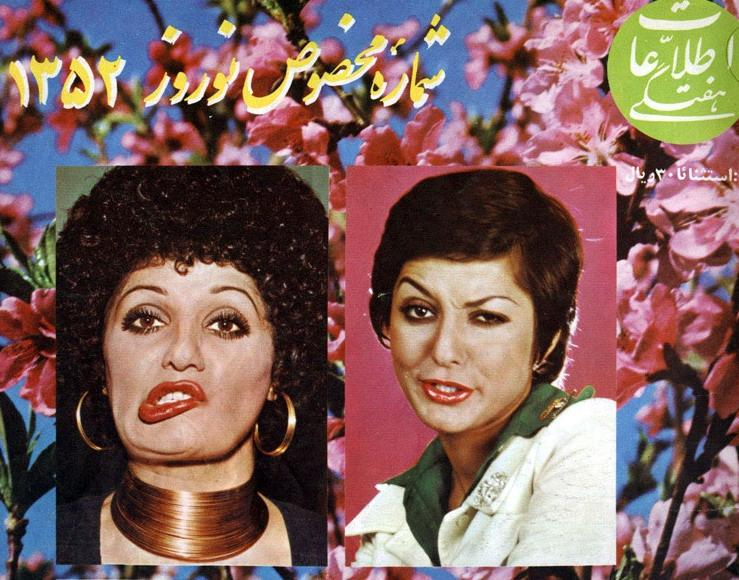
Ramesh and Googoosh on the cover of Ettela'at Haftegy, 1973

Ramesh stepped into the world of music with a focus on Persian traditional music and officially began her career on 1 April 1965 with the song "Parastoo Jaan" composed by Lobat Vala on the segment Yek Shakhe Gol on the radio program Golha.

Her song "To Barooni To Aftabi" was written by Mina Assadi to a composition by Esfandiar Monfaredzadeh and released in 1972. The song was performed only once on Friday Morning Radio and it was later reported that Assadi had written the song as a tribute to Abbas Meftahi, a member of the Iranian People's Fedai Guerrillas.

Ramesh also performed the song "Payiz", written by Forugh Farrokhzad, to a composition by Hossein Ali Mallah. In an interview, she counted this song, along with "Zaer", as the two best songs of her career.

In 1973, she made her cinematic debut with the movie Khialati, but did not appear in any films afterwards.

From the fall of 1981, Ramesh recorded songs such as "Tehroon" and "Ghorbat", many of which were not eventually published. Two songs, titled "Tehroon" and "Goftogoo-ye Sabz" were released as part of the album Bahare Ghariban in the spring of 1982. They were later re-released along with her other works as albums distributed by Caltex Records.

== Death ==
Ramesh died of cardiac arrest on 28 November 2020 in Los Angeles and was buried 13 days later at the Forest Lawn Memorial Park in the presence of fellow artists.

Reza Pahlavi, the former Crown Prince of Iran, issued a public statement following her death, sending his condolences to her family and fans.

== Discography ==
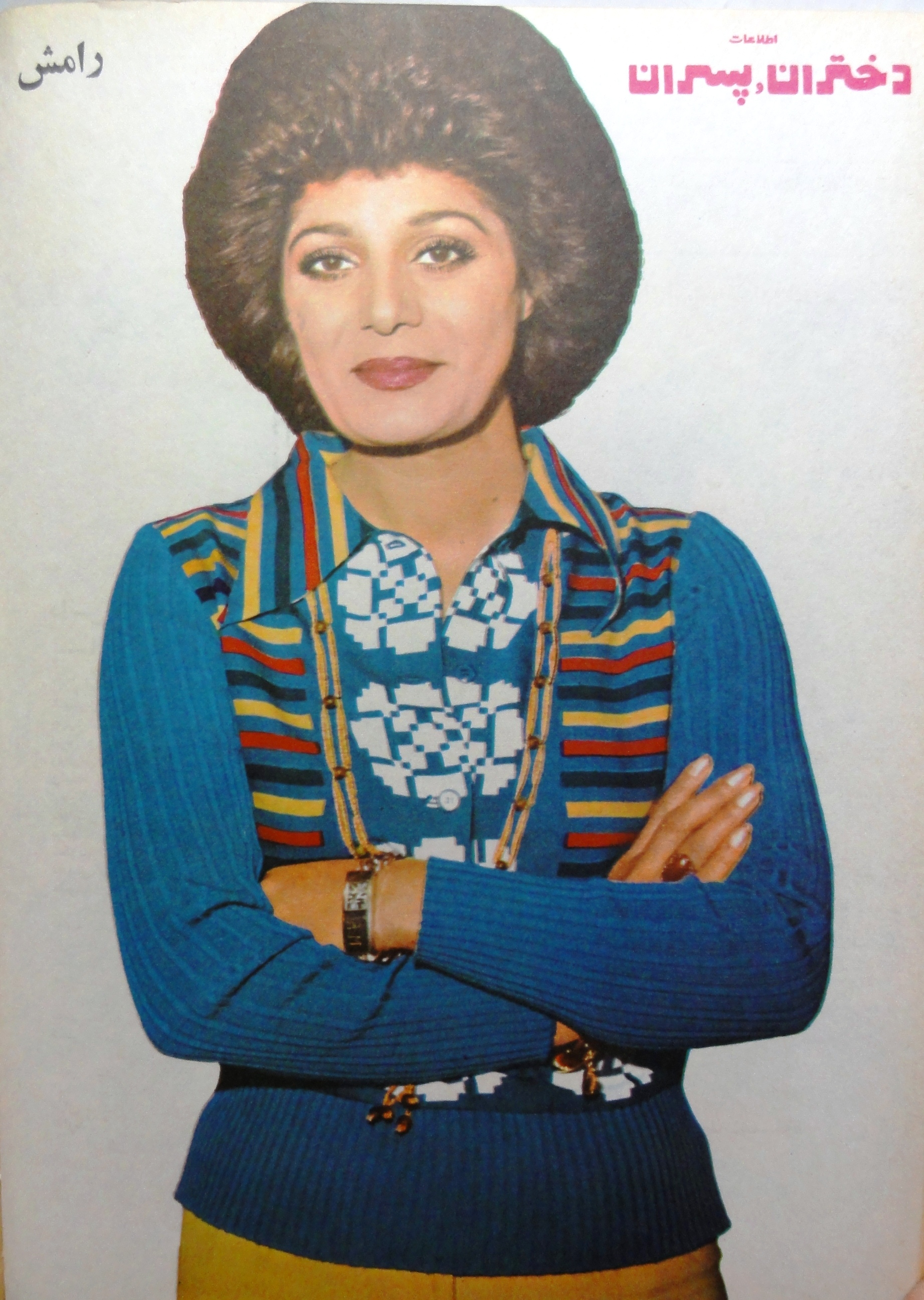
Ramesh on the cover of Dokhtaran Pesaran, 1977

=== Studio albums (recorded before 1979) ===
Title	Year	Label
Darya Darya	1994	Caltex Records
Tohmat	1994	Caltex Records
Adamak	1994	Caltex Records
Dagh Dagh	1994	Caltex Records
Tehroon	1994	Caltex Records
Lahze-haye Entezar	2024	Pars Video

=== Studio albums (recorded after 1979) ===
Title	Year	Label
Bahare Ghariban	1982	Zahrkhand
Jahane Sevvom	1995	Avang Music
Rumi: The Beloved Is Here	2003	Dbf Records
