= Journal de Téhéran =

French-language Iranian daily (1935–1979)

- Type: Daily newspaper
- Publisher: Ettela'at Institution
- Founded: 15 March 1935
- Language: French
- Ceased publication: 27 March 1979
- Headquarters: Tehran
- Country: Pahlavi Iran
- OCLC number: 19987676

Journal de Téhéran was a French-language daily newspaper published from Teheran, Iran. The paper was in circulation between 1935 and 1979. It was the first non-Persian language newspaper published in the country.

== History and profile ==
Journal de Téhéran was founded in 1935. The first issue appeared on 15 March 1935. It was published by Ettela'at Institution in Tehran. As of 1937, its director was M. Massoudi (director of Ettela'at). Said Naficy served as the literary editor of the paper.

The frequency of Journal de Téhéran was daily, but it was published triweekly in 1935. It was given the Cup Emile de Girardin award for being the best foreign newspaper published in French both in 1963 and in 1970. The paper ceased publication on 27 March 1979.
