= Island of Stability (speech) =

1977 speech by U.S. president Jimmy Carter

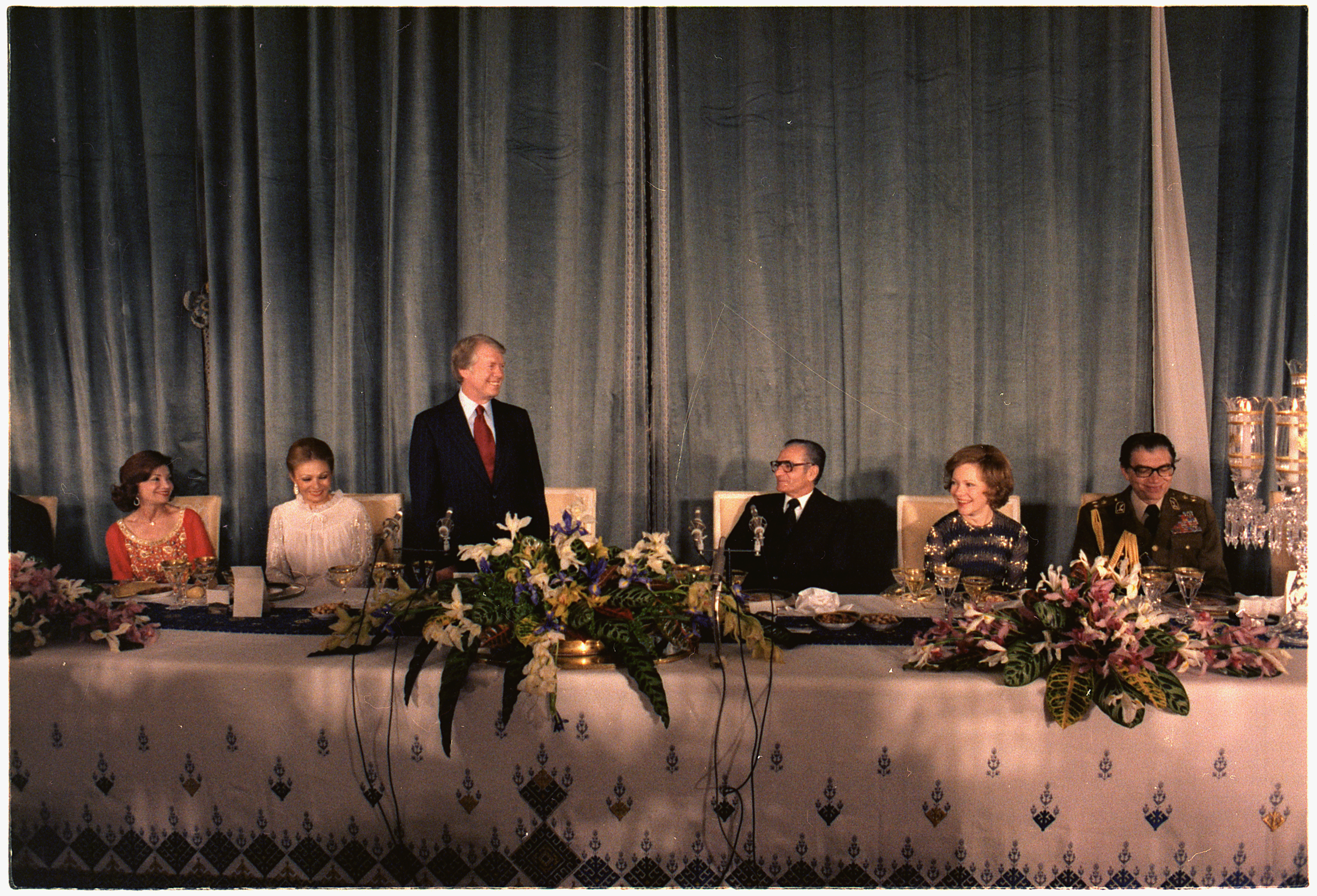
Jimmy Carter with Mohammed Reza Pahlavi at the Niavaran Complex in Tehran, Iran, December 1977.

"Island of Stability" is a phrase that became the namesake for a 1977 speech by American president Jimmy Carter, while he was being hosted by Mohammad Reza Pahlavi at the Niavaran Complex in Tehran, Iran. It was a reflection of Iran's circumstances — regarded as a stable country and a bastion of the Western Bloc in what was otherwise an unstable Middle East under the influence of the Eastern Bloc — and the importance placed on the Shah's rule by the United States. Carter's speech was made one year before the onset of the Islamic Revolution, which overthrew the Pahlavi dynasty and replaced it with the Islamic Republic.

== Place and date ==
In late December 1977, Carter visited the Shah in Iran. At a party for New Year's Eve, held in Tehran's Niavaran Complex, he made a speech describing the American stance on Iran's place in the world order, stating: "Iran is an island of stability in one of the most troubled areas of the world"; he also described Mohammad Reza Pahlavi as a popular shah among the Iranian people.

== Consequences ==
After Carter's speech, the Shah felt encouraged to further suppress his political opponents. One week later, in January 1978, the article "Iran and Red and Black Colonization" was published in Ettela'at under a pseudonym, targeting Ruhollah Khomeini. Following the article's publication, several protests occurred in Mashhad, Qom, and Tehran. Khomeini condemned Carter and described the Shah as a tyrant and a traitor to the Iranian nation.

== Analysis of the support ==
Iranian journalist Ahmad Zeidabadi claimed that Carter was aware of the regional instability spurred by sporadic protests against Pahlavi rule in Iran, and so he made the speech for the Shah as a reassurance of American support. Iranian academic Sadegh Zibakalam has stated that the speech was based on Carter's false impression of Iran's circumstances, and that the American government misjudged the true scope of the Islamic Revolution.

== See also ==
- Jimmy Carter's engagement with Ruhollah Khomeini
