= Fajr decade =

Iranian multi-day holiday

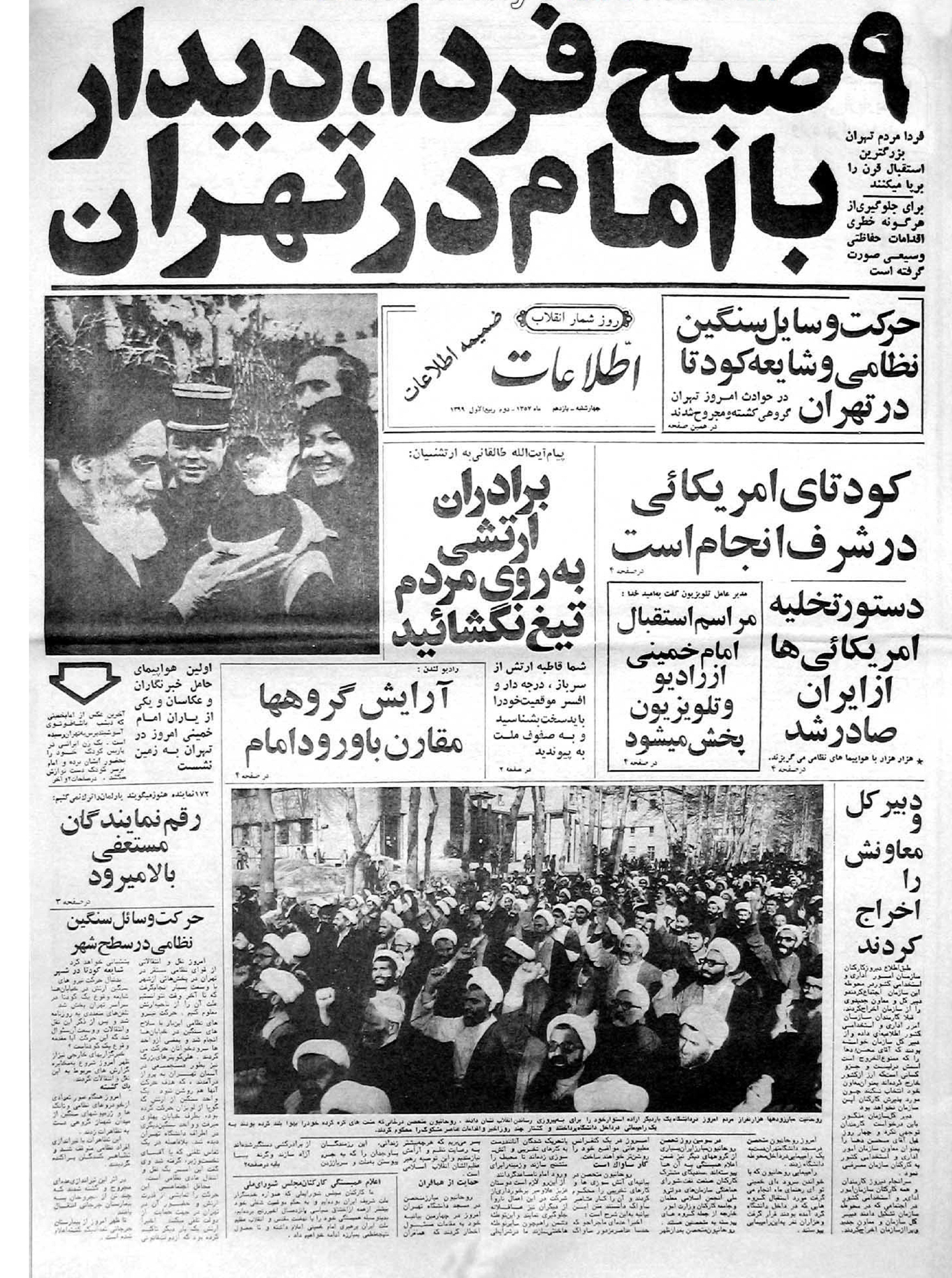
Ettela'at Newspaper titling Tomorrow Morning at 9 Meeting Imam (Khomeni) in Tehran.

The Fajr decade (Persian: دهه فجر, romanized: Daheye Fajr, lit. 'decade of dawn') is a ten-day celebration of Ruhollah Khomeini's return to Iran in 1979. The annual celebration is held between 1 and 11 February. Its beginning coincides with the date of Khomeini's arrival and ending with the Iranian Revolution; a day called the Anniversary of the Iranian Revolution, Islamic Revolution's Victory Day, or 22 of Bahman.

== The ten days ==
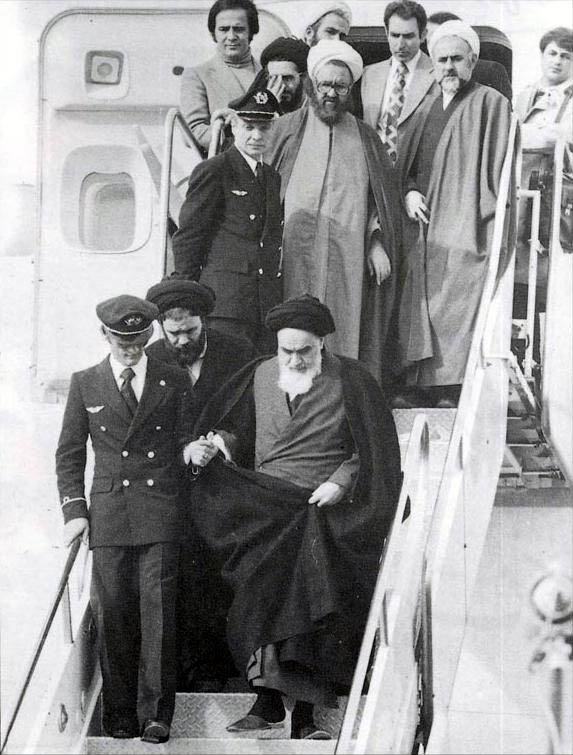
Arrival of Ayatollah Khomeini on 1 February 1979

Dahe-ye Fajr marks the anniversary of the ten-day period between Khomeini's return to Iran (1 February) until the Iranian Revolution (22 Bahman; 11 February) in 1979.

=== 1 February (12 Bahman 1357) ===
On 1 February 1979, Ayatollah Khomeini returned to Tehran after a period of exile in France imposed by the Shah of Iran, Mohammad Reza Pahlavi. Several million people went to Mehrabad International Airport to welcome Khomeini. Khomeini then went to Behesht-e Zahra cemetery, where he gave a lecture. Khomeini said Shapour Bakhtiar's cabinet was illegal, and that he would crash in the mouth of Bakhtiar's government.

=== 2 February (13 Bahman 1357) ===
Khomeini spoke to a crowd of clerics. He said; "From the beginning, the royal regime was against reason ... each nation must determine their own destiny". Radio Moscow reported that Iranian students living in America were opposed to American interference in Iran's internal affairs, and mounted demonstrations against the White House.

=== 3 February (14 Bahman 1357) ===
A press conference attended by nearly 300 Iranian and foreign correspondents was held at 9:00 a.m. on Saturday 14 Bahman, at Allawi School No. 2. At the beginning, a summary of Khomeini's views was read, then the journalists' questions began. Khomeini's response was as follows:

They do nothing that invites the nation to Jihad. We can make a weapon if jihad's time comes. The government will be introduced soon. Bakhtiar's government was illegal. The government must be formed on the basis of God's decree and the people's vote. Members of the Revolutionary Council were appointed.

The first book on the Iranian crisis, written by Ahmad Naruqi and published in Paris, was called Iran Against the Shah. Israel's Minister of Justice announced "We have lost our most important provider of oil".

=== 4 February (15 Bahman 1357) ===
British foreign secretary David Owen discussed the situation in Iran with his American counterpart during a visit to the US. Baghdad sent a delegation to Saudi Arabia to review the situation in Iran and the region. In a council on the Islamic Revolution, Mehdi Bazargan was suggested as the Prime Minister of Iran's interim Government. A number of senior Air Force officers involved with the government were imprisoned. Because the Iranian monarchy was in danger, the American government opposed their own interests to sell weapons, including several AWACS aircraft. General Huyser then decided to cancel the contract so America's interests would not be jeopardized. Airmen held a rally in Behbahan to support Khomeini. Bakhtiar's government limited the people's access to their bank deposits. Javid Shari'atian was banned from Iran by Bakhtiar's administration. Several resigned members of Majlis visited Khomeini. Khosro Qashqaie, a leader of Qashqaees, returned to Iran after 25-years of exile in the US. Stansfield Turner, the director of the CIA said "We did not understand who Khomeini was and the support his movement had". Ayatollah Taleqani requested a general explanation from the government for the disappearance of a number of air force students.

=== 5 February (16 Bahman 1357) ===
Khomeini chose Mehdi Bazargan as prime minister of his interim government. Iran now has two governments. Henry Kissinger condemned recent events in Iran following the human rights law of the US. General Robert Huyser, US special envoy to Iran, left Tehran after a month. A number of military personnel supported Khomeini. With the emergence of definite signs of the victory of the Islamic Revolution, the country was subjected to a series of events and incidents. Bazargan's introduction ceremony was held in the amphitheater of the Alavi School and his appointment as the Prime Minister of the interim government was officially announced. At the beginning of this ceremony, Seyyed Ruhollah Khomeini emphasized in statements referring to the turmoil prevailing in the country and the need to overcome this turmoil. As the prime minister of the interim government, Khomeini tasked Bazargan with holding a referendum to change the regime to an Islamic Republic, forming a Constituent Assembly (of Experts) to ratify the constitution, holding elections for the Shura Council according to the new constitution, and selecting the cabinet without regard to party affiliation.

=== 6 February (17 Bahman 1357) ===
The Shah's Army fires at Bazargan's supporters in Zahedan. The staff of the prime minister's office announced their support for Bazargan with demonstrations. The revolutionaries announced Iran will leave the Central Treaty Organization (CENTO). Most members of Iran's parliament struck to topple Bakhtiar's government. Hojatoleslam Fallahi delivered a speech in the presence of Khomeini and his followers after an eight-year ban on lectures. The parliament ratified the dissolution of SAVAK, Iran's secret police service, and the trial of its former commanders.

=== 7 February (18 Bahman 1357) ===
On 7 February 1979, Khomeini spoke with the Kurdish community about the necessity of unity between Shia and Sunni sects of Islam. At a gathering of lawyers of the High Court, Khomeini expressed that colonialism's plot in create differences between people and clergy. The US Secretary of State announced the United States recognition of the Bakhtiar administration and said Bakhtiar must act in the will of the people. Khomeini's movement and the Army began to negotiate. Opposition groups including academics announced their support for the Bazargan government. People and clerics of Zanjan held a 50,000-strong rally to express their overwhelming support for Khomeini and his government. Hojatoleslam Aboulfazl Shakouri, on behalf of the people and the clergy, recited a 30-article resolution on the dissolution of the monarchy, the parliament and government of Bakhtiar and the legitimacy of Bazargan government. The army, which was fired because of its opposition to the Shah, declared support for Khomeini. Due to the people's disregard for the government-imposed curfew, its length was reduced. An American striker, who injured a driver in Isfahan, was condemned by a Sharia court and was released on payment of atonement. Iranian courts were not eligible to try American nationals. The creation of this court refers to the empowerment of Muslim people. The United Nations expressed its concern about the situation in Iran.

=== 8 February (19 Bahman 1357) ===
Iranian air force officers went to Khomeini's home and promised their loyalty to the revolution.

=== 9 February (20 Bahman 1357) ===
Millions of Iranians came on to the streets to welcome Khomeini's return. The streetfights between people and imperial guard intensified.

=== 10 February (21 Bahman 1357) ===
On 10 February 1979, civilians were armed by the revolutionary personnel of the air force. A curfew was announced by Bakhtiar's government but Khomeini disparaged it and said people had to break it. The revolutionaries subjugated police stations, prisons, and governmental centers.

=== 11 February (22 Bahman 1357) ===
Senior military commanders announced that they were neutral in the conflict between Bakhtiar's government and the revolutionaries. Thus they withdrew from the streets. Bakhtiar resigned and went to Paris. The revolutionaries gained a victory on this day.

== Customs ==
Dahe-ye Fajr is celebrated in various ways, including commemorations at Khomeini's mausoleum and rallies for the achievements of the revolution. The Fajr International Film Festival has been held every year since 1982 in Tehran during Dahe-ye Fajr. It is organised by the Ministry of Culture and Islamic Guidance, and is the largest public film, theater, and music festival in Iran.

== See also ==
- Anniversary of the Islamic Revolution
- Iranian Revolution
- Timeline of the Iranian Revolution
