= Jahangir Razmi =

Pulitzer Prize-winning Iranian photographer

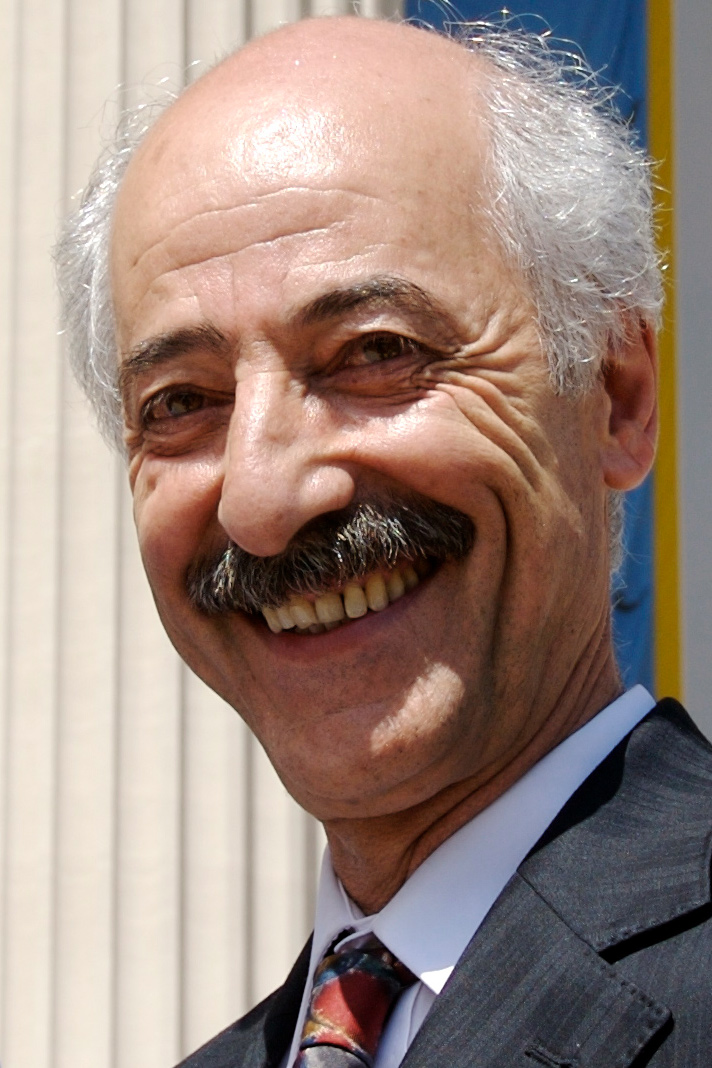
- Razmi receiving his Pulitzer Prize in 2007
- Born: 16 December 1947; Arak
- Awards: Pulitzer Prize for Spot News Photography (1980)
- Website: jahangirrazmi.ir

Jahangir Razmi (Persian: جهانگیر رزمی; born December 16, 1947) is an Iranian photographer and the author of the entry that won the 1980 Pulitzer Prize for Spot News Photography. His photograph, Firing Squad in Iran, was taken on August 27, 1979, and published anonymously in the Iranian daily Ettela'at, the oldest still running newspaper in Iran. Days later, it appeared on the front pages of numerous newspapers around the world. The photograph was the only anonymous winner of a Pulitzer Prize in the 90-year history of the award, as the revelation that Razmi was the photographer was not disclosed until 2006. He was finally able to receive the award in person at the 2007 Pulitzer Prizes ceremony in New York City.

== Early life ==
Razmi grew up in Arak, Iran, born to a military clerk and a housewife. Interested in photography from an early age, he spent much of his time in a local photo shop developing film and shooting portraits. He bought his own camera at the age of 12, and at the urging of a local reporter, began his career in photojournalism by photographing a crime scene. He got a job with a small photo shop after the death of his father, and later entered the military. He was hired by Ettela'at in 1973, and quickly earned a reputation of skill and bravery. Razmi chronicled the country's 1979 change of power, as protests caused the Shah to flee the country and permitted Ayatollah Khomeini to take power. By August 1979, thousands of people had been executed, and Khomeini had begun sending the Iranian military to Kurdistan to prevent an uprising. Razmi and an Ettela'at reporter, Khalil Bahrami, followed.

== Firing Squad in Iran ==
On August 27, 1979, Bahrami learned that a judge he knew would be trying a group of Kurdish militants the following day at the Sanandaj airport. In a 30-minute trial, 11 prisoners were charged with crimes of firearm trafficking, murder, and inciting riots, and were sentenced to death. The men were blindfolded and led outside to the airfield, where they were lined up several meters from their executioners. Razmi was unhindered by security forces, allowing him to stand behind the rightmost executioner and photograph the killings.

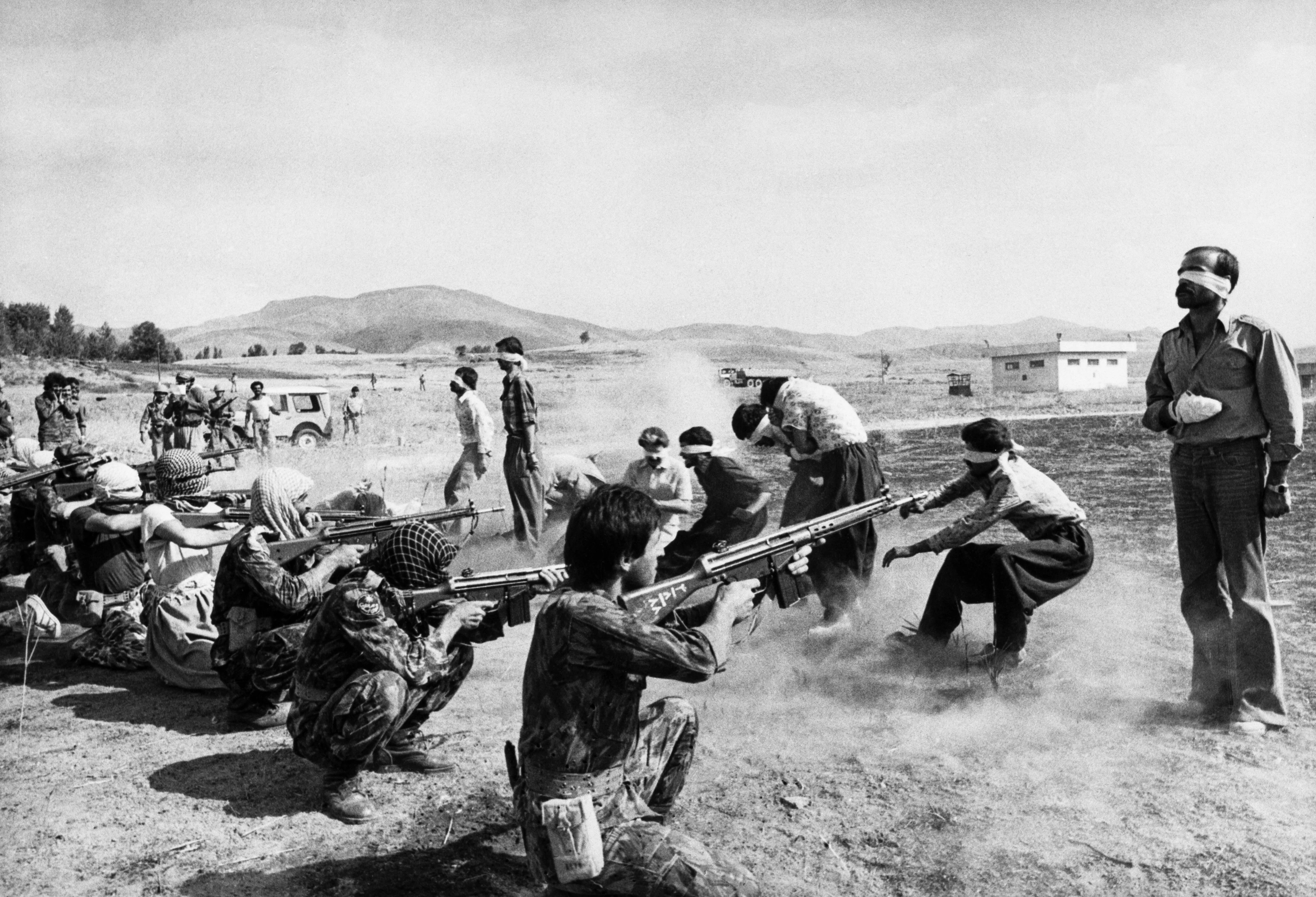
His Pulitzer-winning photograph: "Firing Squad in Iran" (1979)

Razmi delivered his two rolls of film to the offices of Ettela'at, and chief editor Mohammed Heydari quickly decided to lead with one of Razmi's photographs—the one taken at an instant where some of the executioners had fired and others had not—and furthermore decided to publish it anonymously to protect the photographer from government reprisal. United Press International quickly ordered a copy of the image and forwarded it to its bureaus around the world, again without a name associated. On August 29, newspapers such as The New York Times and The Daily Telegraph ran the image, crediting UPI.

The image continued to receive international attention, and was nominated by UPI for the Pulitzer Prize. Not knowing the author of the photograph but having received it on the UPI wire, managing editor Larry DeSantis submitted the image to the Pulitzer Prize committee crediting an anonymous UPI photographer. Then, on April 14, 1980, it became the only anonymous image to ever win the Pulitzer Prize.

== Later life ==
In the years that followed, Razmi continued his photography work, covering the Iran–Iraq War. Growing tired of war, he quit his job at Ettela'at in 1987 and opened a photography studio. In 1997, he was hired as the first "Official Photographer of the President and his Cabinet" under newly installed president Mohammad Khatami.

In 2006, he was approached by the Wall Street Journal and for the first time revealed that he was the photographer. He had never before opted to claim credit for the incendiary image out of fear of retribution, but, emboldened by the passage of time, he finally chose to do so out of disappointment for never being credited before.

== See also ==
- Culture of Iran
- Islamic art
- Iranian art
- Iranian art and architecture
- List of Iranian artists
