= Conspiracy theories about the Iranian Revolution =

Conspiracy theory about the Iranian Revolution

The Iranian Revolution of 1979, in which Shah Mohammed Reza Pahlavi was overthrown and replaced by an Islamist government led by Ruhollah Khomeini, has been the subject of conspiracy theories alleging Western involvement, in particular, that the United States and the United Kingdom secretly opposed the Shah because his White Revolution and Iran's growing independence was unfavorable to their interests in Iranian petroleum. In his own memoirs, Answer to History, the Shah alleges that Western forces most prominently the United Kingdom, the United States, and Big Oil conspired against him all for their own reasons while most notably, he claims due to his manipulation of oil prices.

Khomeini rejected the charges, claiming it was the Shah who was a Western "agent" who had prevented the establishment of Islamic government in Iran until the revolution.

== Background ==
The US State Department drew criticism for doing little to communicate with Tehran or discourage protest and opposition to the Shah. The intelligence community within the US has also been subject due to criticism particularly for reporting to President Jimmy Carter "Iran is not in a revolutionary or even a 'pre-revolutionary' situation". President Jimmy Carter was also blamed for his lack of support for the Shah while failing to deter opposition. Within Iran, the revolution is widely believed to be a British plot to overthrow the Shah. This theory would come to be known as the 1979 Iranian revolution conspiracy theory. The theory was supported by the Shah of Iran who believed his increasing control over oil markets and his 1973 nationalization of Iranian oil prompted international oil companies to unseat him.

The Shah held a low opinion of the mullahs that took control of Iran and believed they could not invoke unrest in Iran without a great deal of foreign support. In 1979, big oil contracts for Iranian oil were due to expire, however, the oil companies did not choose to resign. The Shah perceived the withdrawal of oil companies as a threat to him. Finally, the Shah believed the British and Americans were out to remove him due to his 1973 oil price hike in order to replace him with a new non-nationalistic regime.

International policies pursued by the Shah in order to increase national income by remarkable increases in the price of oil through his leading role in the Organization of the Oil Producing Countries (OPEC) have been stressed as a major cause for a shift of Western interests and priorities, and for a reduction of their support for him reflected in a critical position of Western politicians and media, especially of the administration of U.S. President Jimmy Carter regarding the question of human rights in Iran, and in strengthened economic ties between the United States of America and Saudi Arabia in the 1970s.

== Claims ==
=== Claimed British-American involvement ===
According to a book by F. William Engdahl, A Century of War: Anglo-American Oil Politics and the New World Order, a conspiracy to overthrow the Shah was hatched by the British and Americans in 1978 coinciding with the Iranian revolution in the aftermath of the collapse of negotiations to renew a twenty-five year-old agreement between the Shah's government and BP known as the Consortium Agreement of 1954.

=== Claims by Mohammad Reza Pahlavi ===
Mohammad Reza Pahlavi himself asserted that, "If you lift up Khomeini's beard, you will find MADE IN ENGLAND written under his chin," in the later days of his reign as monarch. This statement by Pahlavi was an adaptation of another saying, "If you lift a mullah's beard, you will find 'Made in Britain' stamped on his chin".

Engdahl quotes Shah Mohammad Reza Pahlavi as blaming the Americans, rather than the British, for his overthrow:

I did not know it then – perhaps I did not want to know – but it is clear to me now that the Americans wanted me out. Clearly this is what the human rights advocates in the State Department wanted … What was I to make of the Administration's sudden decision to call former U.S. Under Secretary of State George Ball to the White House as an adviser on Iran? … Ball was among those Americans who wanted to abandon me and ultimately my country.

=== 1978 Ettela'at article ===
On 7 January 1978, the state news agency Ettela'at published an article accusing Khomeini of being a British agent and a "mad Indian poet". The article claimed that Khomeini's Islamist faction had joined forces with communist dissidents to oppose the regime's modernisation project, and that Khomeini's opposition to the Shah was prompted and paid for by British oil interests.

Supporters of Khomeini, outraged by the article, organized violent demonstrations in response.

== Beliefs of the Iranian public ==
In 2001, BBC Persian journalist Hossein Shahidi has talked about "the deep-rooted belief" among Iranians "that Britain is behind every move in Iran," and in particular that the BBC radio is "credited with, or accused of, having brought about the downfall of" both Pahlavi shahs, Reza Shah and his son Mohammad Reza Pahlavi whose thirty-seven-year rule was brought to an end by the Iranian revolution of 1979.

A survey of Iranian expatriates in Southern California found the leading explanation for the 1979 revolution to be foreign Western plots, as did a recent survey in Isfahan.

== See also ==
- 1980 October Surprise theory
- Allegations of CIA assistance to Osama bin Laden
- Iran–Contra affair
- Iran–United Kingdom relations
- Jimmy Carter's engagement with Ruhollah Khomeini
