= Abbas Massoudi =

Iranian journalist (1895–1974)

- عباس مسعودی
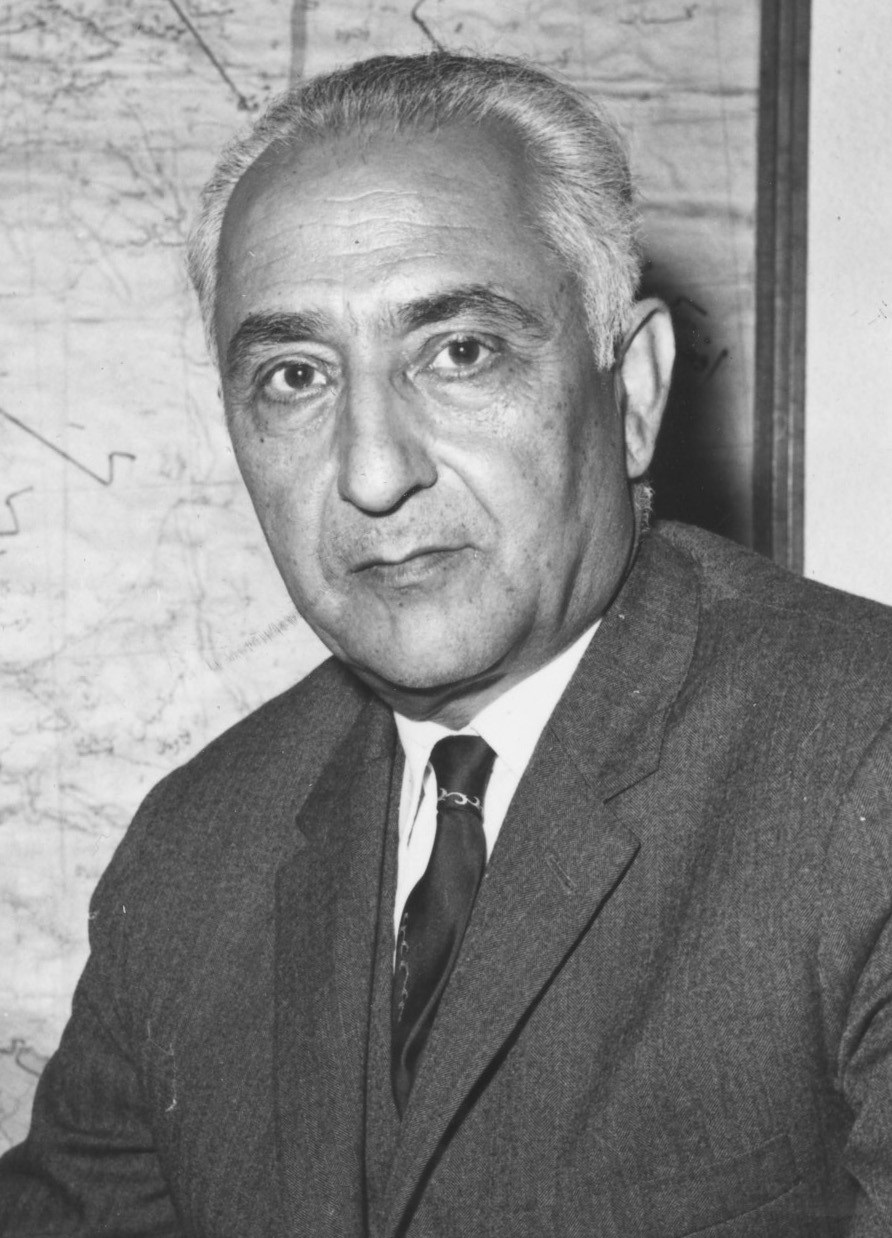
- Massoud Abbasi during his membership in the Senate of Iran
- Born: 1895 (exact date unknown); Tehran, Iran
- Died: 17 June 1974 (aged about 79); Tehran, Iran
- Education: Dar ul-Funun (Persia)
- Occupations: Politician and journalist
- Known for: Founder of the Ettela'at newspaper

Abbas Massoudi (Persian: عباس مسعودی) (1895 – 17 June 1974) was an Iranian politician and journalist. He was for several periods a member of the National Consultative Assembly and Senate of Iran during the Pahlavi dynasty. While he is best known as the founder of the Ettela'at which is the oldest Iranian daily newspaper that is still running.

== Biography ==
When in 1949 the Senate of Iran was formed, Abbas Massoudi was elected and remained as Senator for the rest of his life.
