= Ruhollah Khomeini's contacts with the United States =

Report published in 2016 by BBC

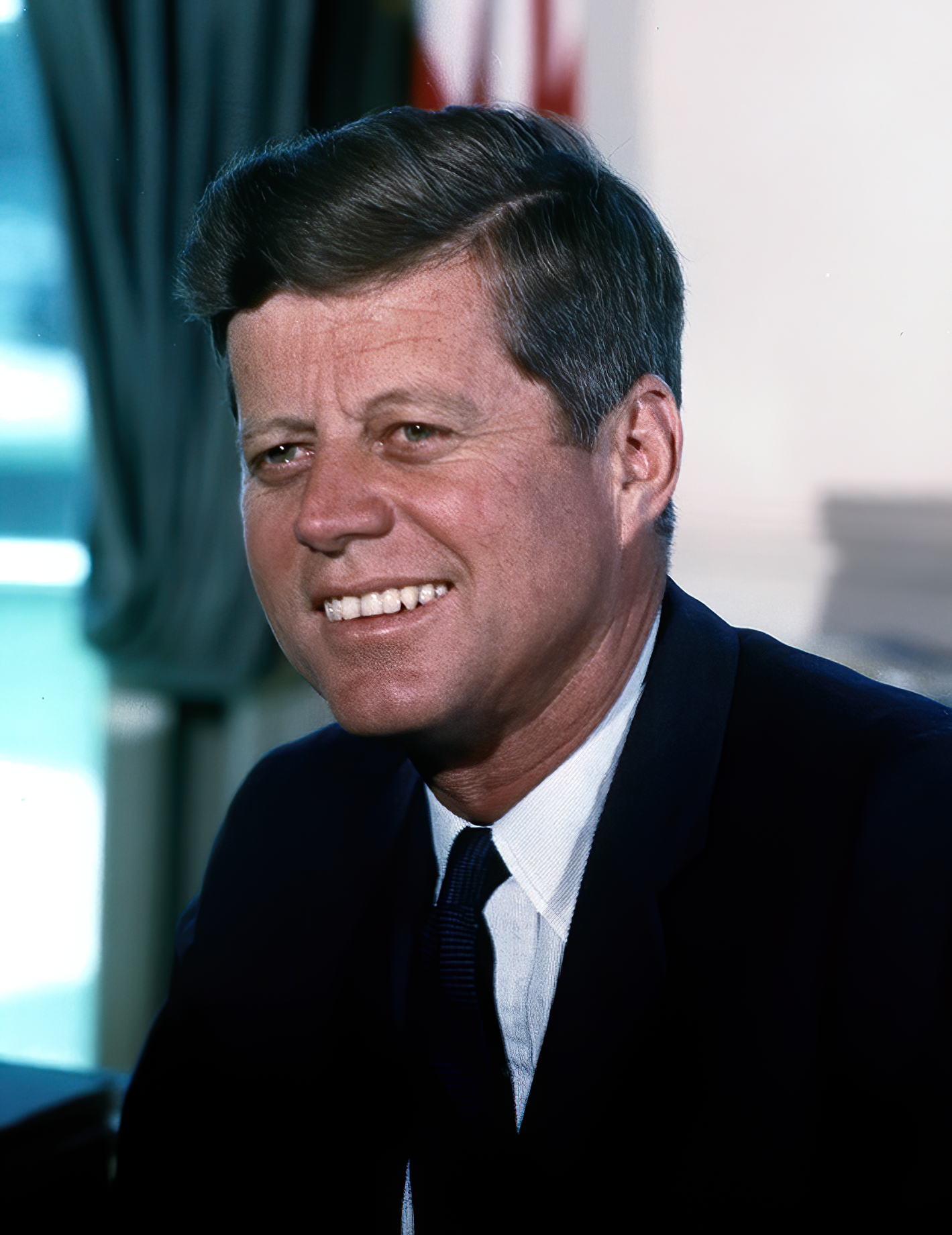
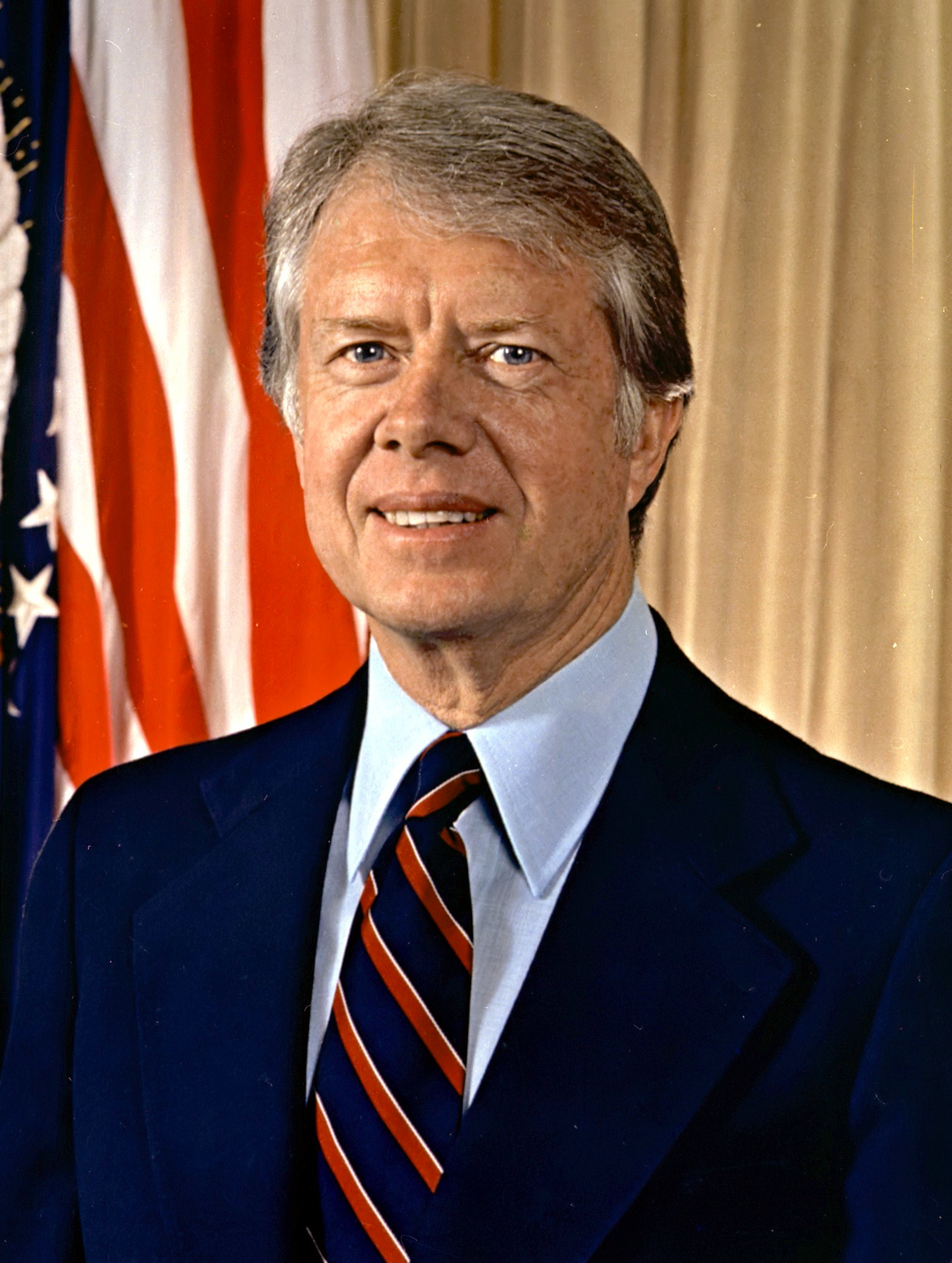
John F. Kennedy (left) and Jimmy Carter (right), both presidents were said to have relations with Khomeini

In 2016, the BBC published a report which stated that the administration of United States president Jimmy Carter (1977–1981) had extensive contact with Ayatollah Ruhollah Khomeini and his entourage in the prelude to the Iranian Revolution of 1979. The report was based on "newly declassified US diplomatic cables". According to the report, Carter and his administration helped to discourage the Imperial Iranian Army from launching a military coup against then-prime minister Shapour Bakhtiar in an effort to save the monarchy, and made efforts to find an accommodation between Khomeini and the military. According to the report, as mentioned by The Guardian, Khomeini in turn "went to great lengths to ensure the Americans would not jeopardise his plans to return to Iran - and even personally wrote to US officials" and assured them not to worry about their interests in Iran, particularly oil.

In his memoir, Answer to History, Mohammad Reza Shah claimed that the little-known Khomeini was able to ignite the 1963 demonstrations in Iran with help from foreign agents and that US president John F. Kennedy initially wanted him out of power before later changing his opinion of him. The Shah also claimed that President Jimmy Carter was another liberal president who reminded him of Kennedy and who wanted to interfere in Iran's affairs. In a year prior to the Revolution, Big Oil contracts with Iran were expiring; however, the companies never sought to renew the contracts with the Shah, which according to him was a blackmail threat. Ultimately the Shah claimed that the Americans and British colluded against him due to his 1973 nationalisation and oil price hike. The BBC report also showed a 1980 CIA analysis, which portrays Khomeini's attempts to contact the US as far back as 1963, during John F. Kennedy's administration.

== November 1978 – January 1979 ==
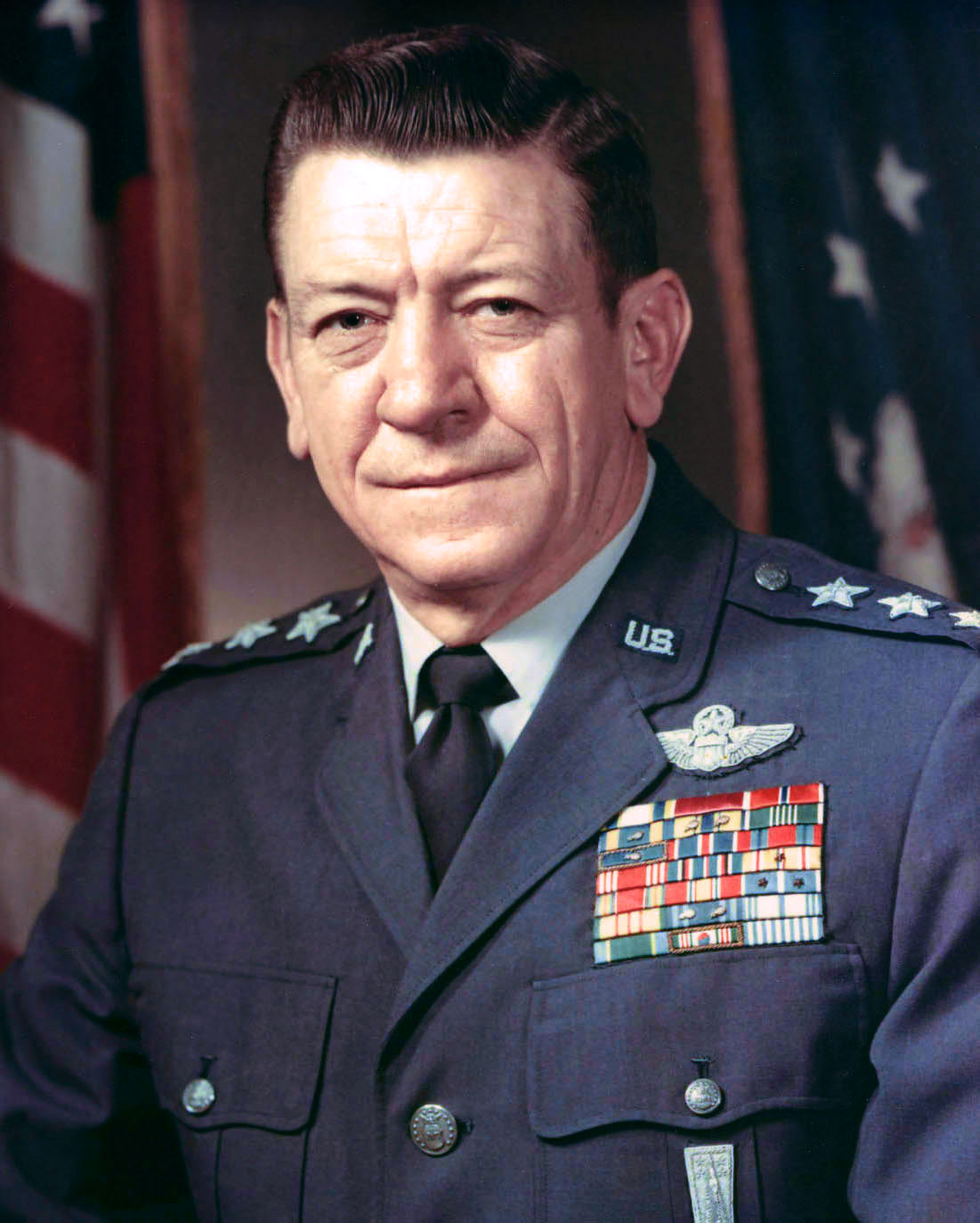
Picture of Robert E. Huyser

A declassified cable shows that on 9 November 1978, William H. Sullivan, then-US ambassador to Iran, alerted the Carter administration that the Shah was "doomed". Sullivan stated that the US should get the Shah and his most senior generals to leave the country, and construct an agreement between junior commanders and Ruhollah Khomeini. Sullivan's suggestion initially caused his relationship with Carter "to go sour", but Carter later reluctantly conceded that the situation was untenable. In January 1979, General Robert E. Huyser was dispatched to Iran. Per the BBC, the reports show that Huyser was sent to Iran in order to prevent the Iranian military leaders from orchestrating a coup against civilian prime minister Shapour Bakhtiar in an effort to save the Shah. He was also reportedly tasked with convincing the Iranian military leaders to meet Mohammad Beheshti, Khomeini's second in command. Huyser was soon faced with accusations of neutralising the Iranian military and for paving the way for Khomeini's ascension to power. However, Huyser himself always strongly denied these claims. Huyser's reports to Washington have not yet been published. In the meantime, US ambassador William Sullivan actively worked behind the scenes in order to undermine Prime Minister Bakhtiar:

[He] praised Bakhtiar's courage to his face, but behind his back, told Washington that the man was "quixotic", playing for high stakes, and would not take "guidance" from the US. The state department saw his [Shapour Bakhtiar] government as "not viable". The White House strongly backed him in public, but in private, explored ousting him in a coup.

On 9 January 1979, David L. Aaron told Zbigniew Brzezinski that he believed the "best that can result" would be a military coup against Bakhtiar and then a deal between Iran's military leaders and Khomeini's entourage which would remove the Shah from power. On 14 January 1979, with the Shah's government still in power, Cyrus Vance sent a message to the American embassies in France and Iran:

We have decided that it is desirable to establish a direct American channel to Khomeini's entourage.

On 15 January 1979, Warren Zimmermann, an official of Carter's government in France, met with Ebrahim Yazdi in Paris. Zimmermann met with Yazdi on two more occasions in Paris, the last meeting being on 18 January 1979. Meanwhile, on 16 January 1979, Mohammad Reza Pahlavi had left Iran; suffering from terminal cancer, he had been told by Carter a few days earlier, on 11 January 1979, to "leave promptly".

On 27 January 1979, Khomeini told the US just weeks before the overthrow of Mohammad Reza Pahlavi's government:

It is advisable that you recommend to the army not to follow Bakhtiar (...) You will see we are not in any particular animosity with the Americans. (...) There should be no fear about oil. It is not true that we wouldn’t sell to the US. (...)

In mid-to-late January 1979, according to the declassified documents, Carter's government admitted that the military, whom were having daily talks with Huyser, would have "no fundamental problems" with the abolishment of the monarchy — as long as the eventual result would come gradually and in a controlled way. Khomeini and his entourage took this as a de facto admittance that Carter had discarded Mohammad Reza Pahlavi.

== February 1979 ==
Two days before Khomeini's return from France, Commander-in-Chief Abbas Gharabaghi told Khomeini's entourage that the Iranian military was not against political alterations, particularly with regard to "the cabinet". On 1 February 1979, Khomeini arrived in Tehran. By 5 February 1979, the Iranian military was not resistant to changes in the type of government anymore, as long as these changes were conducted "legally and gradually". By this point, junior officers and conscripts deserted and a mutiny erupted in the Air Force. On 11 February 1979, Iran's military leaders, behind Shapour Bakhtiar's back, declared neutrality, which de facto meant that they had surrendered.

== 1980 meeting in Paris ==
Declassified documents from Jimmy Carter and an account of Hamilton Jordan, Carter's chief of staff, show that Jordan met with Sadegh Ghotbzadeh in Paris in 1980 to discuss the possibility of extraditing the Shah in exchange for the release of embassy hostages. This occurred during the Shah's exile in Panama when Arístides Royo would not grant the Islamic Republic's extradition's request.

== Reactions ==
Iran's political elite has dismissed these declassified reports. Khomeini's successor, Ali Khamenei, stated that "it was based on fabricated documents". Ebrahim Yazdi (formerly a close associate of Khomeini) and Saeed Hajjarian viewed the BBC report with skepticism.

Gary Sick, former member of the National Security Council during the period of the Islamic revolution has stated to The Guardian that "the documents [shown by the BBC] are genuine". However, he added that he "never saw" the document describing Khomeini's alleged attempts to get into contact with the US back in 1963. Carter biographer Kai Bird wrote in 2021 that the Iranian revolution was "an unmitigated disaster for his administration". Carter had been ill-served by nearly all his advisers, most particularly by his national security adviser Brzezinski. Khomeini had written a seventy-four-page blueprint for a harsh, fundamentalist Islamic republic nine years earlier that circulated for years in the country but the CIA translated and published the document only two months after the shah's departure.

== See also ==
- Conspiracy theories about the overthrow of Mohammad Reza Pahlavi
- Island of Stability (speech)
- 1980 October Surprise theory
