= Ettela'at =

Iranian daily newspaper

Ettela'at Newspaper
- Type: Daily newspaper
- Founder: Abbas Massoudi
- Editor: Abdolreza Izadpanah
- Founded: 10 July 1926; 100 years ago
- Political alignment: Conservatism (Iranian)
- Headquarters: Tehran, Iran
- Website: ettelaat.com

Ettela'at (Persian: اطلاعات, romanized: Ettelâ'ât, lit. 'Information') is a Persian-language daily newspaper of record published in Tehran, Iran. It is among the oldest publications in the country, and the oldest running Persian daily newspaper in the world. The paper has a conservative stance, and focuses on political, cultural, social, and economic news. Until the 1979 Iranian Revolution, the newspaper was associated with its chief founder Abbas Massoudi (1895–1974).

== History and profile ==
Ettala'at was started by Abbas Massoudi in 1926 as a four-page paper and sold nearly 2,000 copies per week. The circulation of the paper was 15,000 copies during the reign of Reza Shah. At the beginning of World War II. the paper was expanded and had eight pages.

Ettala'at supported Shah Mohammad Reza Pahlavi during his reign. One of the editors-in-chief was Hassan Sayyed Javadi, younger brother of Ali Sayyed Javadi, another journalist with Kayhan, and Ahmad Sayyed Javadi, sometime interior minister of the Islamic government. In the late 1960s the publisher of the paper was Abbas Massoudi who served as the vice president of the Iranian Senate.

On 6 January 1978, an article appeared in Ettela'at, suggesting Ayatollah Ruhollah Khomeini was a British agent serving colonialism. The article also challenged Khomeini's Iranian origins and claimed that he had been living an immoral life. The next day, clerics in Qom protested and the police demanded they disperse. When they refused, police opened fire and at least twenty people were killed. Iranian media displayed outrage, which increased tensions leading up to the 1979 Iranian Revolution. During the clashes between the Imperial forces and revolutionaries, Kayhan and Ettela'at was censored in October 1978.

Following the revolution, Ettela'at became a state-sponsored publication together with Kayhan and Jomhouri-e Eslami of which publishers are directly appointed by the Supreme Leader.

On 31 January 1979, Kayhan and Ettela'at announced that Khomeini would return from Paris the next day. Ettela'at's title was "tomorrow morning at 9, visiting Imam in Tehran." The news led to the flow of millions of people from different cities to Tehran. In 1979, the newspaper published a photo known as Firing Squad in Iran, showing Kurdish militants being executed by Iranian authorities. The photo would later go on to win the 1980 Pulitzer Prize, attributed to "Anonymous", but later was revealed in 2006 to be Jahangir Razmi.

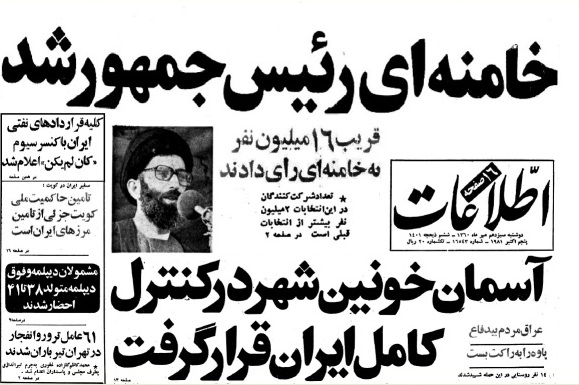
Ettela'at's coverage of Ali Khamenei becoming President (1981)

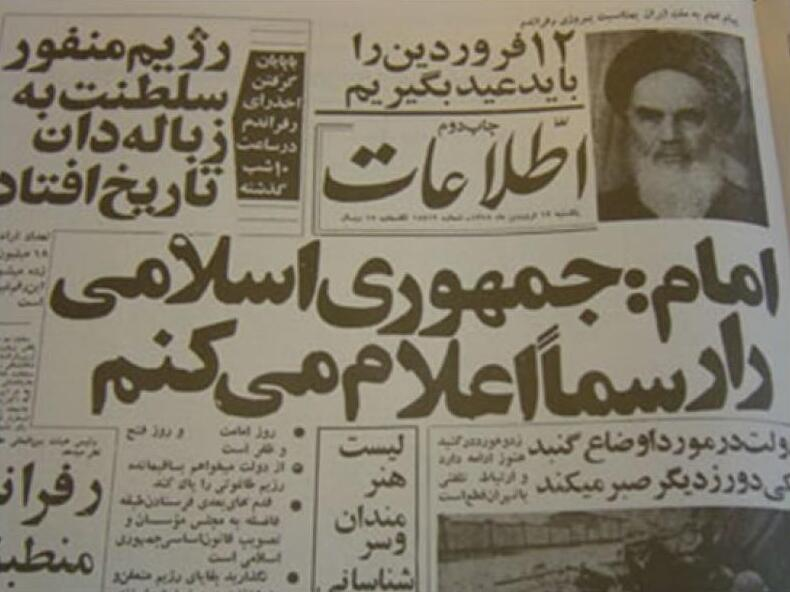
First page of Ettela'at on Iranian Islamic Republic Day (1 April 1979)

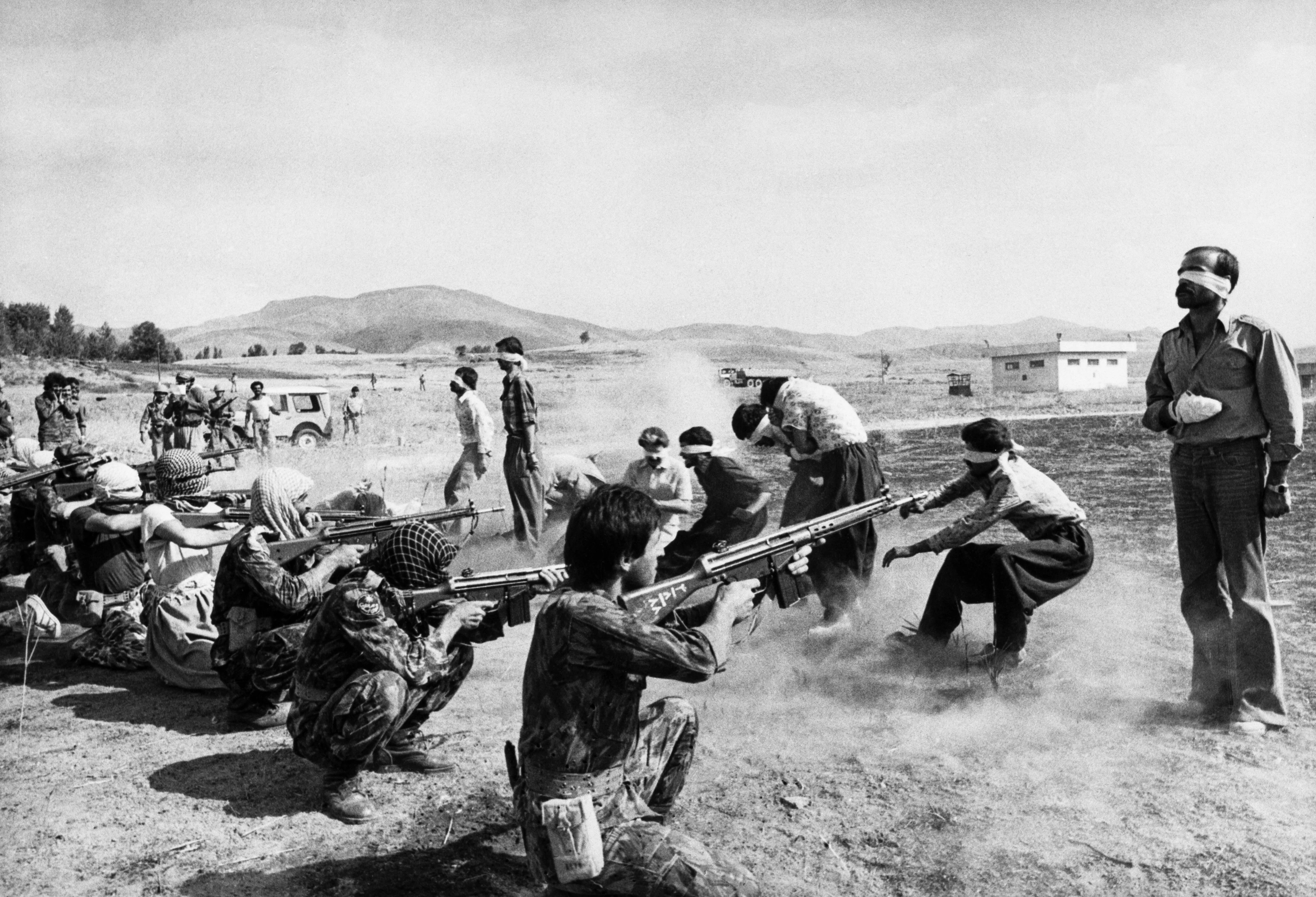
Firing Squad in Iran, published by Ettela'at (28 August 1979)

== See also ==
- List of newspapers in Iran
- "The Shah Is Gone"

== General and cited references ==
- Parvin, Nassereddin (1998). "EṬṬELĀʿĀT". Encyclopaedia Iranica. Vol. IX, Fasc. 1. pp. 58–62.
