= 2007 AFC Champions League =

26th edition of premier club football tournament organized by the AFC

Tournament details
- Dates: 7 March – 14 November 2007
- Teams: 27

Final positions
- Champions: (Japan) Urawa Red Diamonds (1st title)
- Runners-up: (Iran) Sepahan

Tournament statistics
- Matches played: 92
- Goals scored: 230 (2.5 per match)
- Top scorer(s): Mota (7 goals)
- Best player: Yuichiro Nagai
- Fair play award: (Japan) Urawa Red Diamonds

The 2007 AFC Champions League was the 26th edition of the top-level Asian club football tournament and the 5th edition under the current AFC Champions League title.

Japanese side Urawa Red Diamonds became champions for the first time, beating Sepahan of Iran and becoming the fourth Japanese club to win the Asian championship, and qualified for the 2007 FIFA Club World Cup.

== Format ==
Group Stage

A total of 28 clubs were divided into 7 groups of four, based on region i.e. East Asian and Southeast Asian clubs were drawn in groups E to G, while the rest were grouped in groups A to D. Each club played double round-robin (home and away) against fellow three group members, a total of 6 matches each. Clubs received 3pts for a win, 1pt for a tie, 0pts for a loss. The clubs were ranked according to points and tie breakers were in the following order:

- Points earned between the clubs in question
- Goal Differential between the clubs in question
- Points earned within the group
- Goal Differential within the group
- Goals For within the group

The seven group winners along with the defending champion advanced to the quarter-finals.

Knockout Round

All eight clubs were randomly matched; however, the only restriction was that the clubs from the same country could not face each other in the quarter-finals. The games were conducted in 2 legs, home and away, and the aggregate score decided the match winner. If the aggregate score couldn't produce a winner, "away goals rule" was used. If still tied, clubs played extra time, where "away goals rule" still applied. If still tied, the game went to penalties.

== Participating clubs ==
After their admission into the AFC, Australia were granted two entries. Because of this, both Thailand and Vietnam were restricted to entering just one club, with a second club from each country playing in the AFC Cup.

West Asia		East Asia	
Quarter-finals
Team	Qualifying method	Team	Qualifying method
		(South Korea) Jeonbuk Hyundai Motors	Defending champions
Group Stage
Team	Qualifying method	Team	Qualifying method
(Iran) ~~Esteghlal~~	2005–06 Iran Pro League champions	(Australia) Adelaide United	2005–06 A-League premiers
(Iran) Sepahan	2005–06 Hazfi Cup winners	(Australia) Sydney FC	2006 A-League Grand Final winners
(Iraq) Al-Zawraa	2005–06 Iraqi Premier League champions	(China) Shandong Luneng Taishan	2006 Chinese Super League champions & 2006 Chinese FA Cup winners
(Iraq) Al-Najaf	2005–06 Iraqi Premier League runners-up	(China) Shanghai Shenhua	2006 Chinese Super League runners-up
Kuwait SC	2005–06 Kuwaiti Premier League champions	(Indonesia) Persik Kediri	2006 Liga Indonesia Premier Division champions
(Kuwait) Al-Arabi	2006 Kuwait Emir Cup winners	(Indonesia) Arema Malang	2006 Copa Indonesia winners
(Qatar) Al Sadd	2005–06 Qatar Stars League champions	(Japan) Urawa Red Diamonds	2006 J.League Division 1 champions & 2006 Emperor's Cup winners
(Qatar) Al-Rayyan	2005–06 Emir of Qatar Cup winners	(Japan) Kawasaki Frontale	2006 J.League Division 1 runners-up
(Saudi Arabia) Al Shabab	2005–06 Saudi Premier League champions	(South Korea) Seongnam Ilhwa Chunma	2006 K League champions
(Saudi Arabia) Al Hilal	2005–06 Saudi Crown Prince Cup winners	(South Korea) Chunnam Dragons	2006 Korean FA Cup winners
(Syria) Al-Karamah	2005–06 Syrian Premier League champions	(Thailand) Bangkok University FC	2006 Thailand Premier League champions
(Syria) Al-Ittihad	2005–06 Syrian Cup winners	(Vietnam) Gach Dong Tam Long An	2006 V-League winners
(United Arab Emirates) Al Wahda	2005–06 UAE Football League runners-up		
(United Arab Emirates) Al Ain	2005–06 UAE President's Cup winners		
(Uzbekistan) Pakhtakor	2006 Uzbek League champions & 2006 Uzbekistan Cup winners		
(Uzbekistan) Neftchi Fergana	2006 Uzbek League runners-up		

Notes

1. Esteghlal were disqualified from the competition by the AFC for failing to submit their player registration form in time. Consequently, Group B was reduced to three teams.

== Group stage ==
The draw took place in Kuala Lumpur on 22 December, allocating teams into seven groups. In February, the AFC disqualified Esteghlal Tehran from Group B for failing to register their players in time.

Group matches were scheduled to be played over match days on 7 March 21 March 11 April 25 April 9 and 23 May 2007.

=== Group A ===
Team	Pld	W	D	L	GF	GA	GD	Pts
(United Arab Emirates) Al-Wahda	6	4	1	1	13	6	+7	13
(Iraq) Al-Zawraa	6	3	2	1	9	6	+3	11
(Kuwait) Al-Arabi	6	2	1	3	10	12	−2	7
(Qatar) Al-Rayyan	6	0	2	4	3	11	−8	2

7 March 2007

Al-Arabi (Kuwait)	0–1	(Iraq) Al-Zawraa
	(Report)	Muslim Mubarak 66'

Sabah Al Salem Stadium, Kuwait City, Kuwait
Attendance: 1,500
Referee: Muhsen Basma (Syria)
7 March 2007

Al-Rayyan (Qatar)	0–1	(United Arab Emirates) Al-Wahda
	(Report)	Mohamed al-Shehhi 81'

Al Rayyan Sports Club, Al Rayyan, Qatar
Attendance: 2,000
Referee: Yang Zhiqiang (China)

21 March 2007

Al-Wahda (United Arab Emirates)	4–1	(Kuwait) Al-Arabi
Mamadou Bagayoko 40' 56' (pen.); Saleh Al Menhali 63'; Bashir Saeed 68'	6 (Report)	Mohamed Jarragh 35'

Al-Nahyan Stadium, Abu Dhabi, UAE
Attendance: 3,500
Referee: Yuichi Nishimura (Japan)
21 March 2007

Al-Zawraa (Iraq)	0–0	(Qatar) Al-Rayyan
	(Report)

Al Rayyan Sports Club, Al Rayyan, Qatar
Attendance: 1,500
Referee: Lee Gi-Young (South Korea)

11 April 2007

Al-Zawraa (Iraq)	1–2	(United Arab Emirates) Al-Wahda
Ahmad Abd Ali 46'	(Report)	Abdulrahim Jumaa 13'; Bashir Saeed 74'

Al Rayyan Sports Club, Al Rayyan, Qatar
Attendance: 500
Referee: Talaat Najm (Lebanon)
11 April 2007

Al-Arabi (Kuwait)	1–1	(Qatar) Al-Rayyan
Jarrah Al Zuhair 60'	(Report)	Adel Lamy 52'

Sabah Al Salem Stadium, Kuwait City, Kuwait
Attendance: 7,300
Referee: Naser Al-Ghafary (Jordan)

25 April 2007

Al-Rayyan (Qatar)	1–3	(Kuwait) Al-Arabi
Thiago Ribeiro 44'	(report)	Khaled Khalaf 25'; Firas Al Khatib 63', 69'

Al Rayyan Sports Club, Doha, Qatar
Attendance: 1,000
Referee: Ali Al Mutlaq (Saudi Arabia)
25 April 2007

Al-Wahda (United Arab Emirates)	1–1	(Iraq) Al-Zawraa
Abdulrahim Jumaa 57'	(report)	Haidar Sabah 75'

Al-Nahyan Stadium, Abu Dhabi, UAE
Attendance: 3,000
Referee: Jasim Karim (Bahrain)

9 May 2007

Al-Zawraa (Iraq)	3–2	(Kuwait) Al-Arabi
Wissam Kadhim 21'; Ahmad Ibrahim 70'; Nawaf Falah 78'	(Report)	Firas Al Khatib 50', 84'

Al Rayyan Sports Club, Al Rayyan, Qatar
Attendance: 500
Referee: Mohsen Torky (Iran)
9 May 2007

Al-Wahda (United Arab Emirates)	3–0	(Qatar) Al-Rayyan
Maurito 8'; Haidar Alo Ali 30' (pen.); Mamadou Bagayoko 76' (pen.)	(Report)

Al-Nahyan Stadium, Abu Dhabi, UAE
Referee: Mark Shield (Australia)

23 May 2007

Al-Arabi (Kuwait)	3–2	(United Arab Emirates) Al-Wahda
Khaled Abd Al Kudos 6'; Khaled Khalaf 55'; Jarrah Al Zuhair 87'	(Report)	Saeed Salem 23'; Yaser Matar 90'

Sabah Al Salem Stadium, Kuwait City, Kuwait
Referee: Ravshan Irmatov (Uzbekistan)
23 May 2007

Al-Rayyan (Qatar)	1–3	(Iraq) Al-Zawraa
Saoud Khames 75'	(Report)	Salman Mesbeh 13' (o.g.); Abdul-Salam Abood 26'; Haidar Sabah 34'

Al-Gharrafa Stadium, Doha, Qatar
Attendance: 200
Referee: Subkhiddin Mohd Salleh (Malaysia)

=== Group B ===
Team	Pld	W	D	L	GF	GA	GD	Pts
(Saudi Arabia) Al-Hilal	4	2	2	0	5	1	+4	8
(Uzbekistan) Pakhtakor	4	2	0	2	3	5	−2	6
Al Kuwait	4	0	2	2	2	4	−2	2
(Iran) Esteghlal	0	0	0	0	0	0	0	0 (Note: Esteghlal was disqualified for failing to submit their players list in time.)

Notes:
7 March 2007

Al-Hilal (Saudi Arabia)	1–1	Al Kuwait
Rodrigão 16'	(Report)	Fahad Awadh 90'

King Fahd II Stadium, Riyadh, Saudi Arabia
Attendance: 50,000
Referee: Subkhiddin Mohd Salleh (Malaysia)

21 March 2007

Al Kuwait	0–1	(Uzbekistan) Pakhtakor
	(Report)	Aleksandr Kletskov 69'

Al Kuwait Sports Club Stadium, Kuwait City, Kuwait
Attendance: 3,000
Referee: Satop Tongkhan (Thailand)

11 April 2007

Pakhtakor (Uzbekistan)	0–2	(Saudi Arabia) Al-Hilal
	(Report)	Omar Al-Ghamdi 54'; Rodrigão 59'

Army Stadium, Tashkent, Uzbekistan
Attendance: 10,000
Referee: Junjie Huang (China)

25 April 2007

Al-Hilal (Saudi Arabia)	2–0	(Uzbekistan) Pakhtakor
Rodrigão 30' 90' (pen.)	(report)

King Fahd II Stadium, Riyadh, Saudi Arabia
Attendance: 40,000
Referee: Lee Gi-Young (South Korea)

9 May 2007

Al Kuwait	0–0	(Saudi Arabia) Al-Hilal
	(Report)

Al Kuwait Sports Club Stadium, Kuwait City, Kuwait
Attendance: 7,000
Referee: Jasim Karim (Bahrain)

23 May 2007

Pakhtakor (Uzbekistan)	2–1	Al Kuwait
Uche Iheruome 45'; Shakhboz Erkinov 59'	(Report)	Faraj Laheeb 71'

Army Stadium, Tashkent, Uzbekistan
Attendance: 3,000
Referee: Shamsul Maidin (Singapore)

=== Group C ===
Team	Pld	W	D	L	GF	GA	GD	Pts
(Syria) Al-Karamah	6	3	2	1	11	7	+4	11
(Uzbekistan) Neftchi	6	3	1	2	6	7	−1	10
(Iraq) Najaf FC	6	2	2	2	9	8	+1	8
(Qatar) Al Sadd	6	1	1	4	6	10	−4	4

7 March 2007

Al-Karamah (Syria)	2–1	(Qatar) Al Sadd
Senghor Koupouleni 70'; Abdalrahman Akkari 85'	(Report)	Magid Mohamed 22'

Khaled bin Walid Stadium, Homs, Syria
Attendance: 40,000
Referee: Madhad Saif Al Badwawi (United Arab Emirates)
7 March 2007

Najaf FC (Iraq)	0–1	(Uzbekistan) Neftchi
	(Report)	Kholmatov 71'

Sabah Al Salem Stadium, Kuwait City, Kuwait
Attendance: 1,500
Referee: Hedayat Mombini (Iran)

21 March 2007

Al Sadd (Qatar)	1–4	(Iraq) Najaf FC
Talal Al Bloushi 45'	(Report)	Aqeel Mohammed 47'; Saeed Mohsen 55' 86' (pen.); Karrar Jassim 70'

Al Sadd Stadium, Doha, Qatar
Attendance: 1,500
Referee: Ben Williams (Australia)
21 March 2007

Neftchi (Uzbekistan)	2–1	(Syria) Al-Karamah
Anvar Berdiev 27'; Nosirbek Otakuziev 77'	(Report)	Firas Issmael 32'

Fargona Stadium, Fergana, Uzbekistan
Attendance: 20,000
Referee: Tayeb Hasan Shamsuzzaman (Bangladesh)

11 April 2007

Al Sadd (Qatar)	2–0	(Uzbekistan) Neftchi
Khalfan Ibrahim 65'; Emerson 75'	(Report)

Al Sadd Stadium, Doha, Qatar
Attendance: 2,000
Referee: Tan Hai (China)
11 April 2007

Al Karamah (Syria)	1–1	(Iraq) Najaf FC
Fahd Awde 90' (pen.)	(Report)	Falah Hasan Kadhim 71'

Khaled bin Walid Stadium, Homs, Syria
Attendance: 30,000
Referee: Jasim Karim (Bahrain)

25 April 2007

Najaf FC (Iraq)	2–4	(Syria) Al-Karamah
Saeed Mohsen 7' (pen.); Qassim Faraj 86' (pen.)	(Report)	Jehad Al Hussein 46', 52'; Fahd Awde 50'; Senghor Koupouleni 65'

Sabah Al Salem Stadium, Kuwait City, Kuwait
Attendance: 40,000
Referee: Saad Al Fadhli (Kuwait)
25 April 2007

Neftchi (Uzbekistan)	2–1	(Qatar) Al Sadd
Iqboljon Akramov 1'; Nasim Shoimov 41'	(Report)	Emerson 17'

Fargona Stadium, Fergana, Uzbekistan
Attendance: 14,600
Referee: Kazuhiko Matsumura (Japan)

9 May 2007

Al Sadd (Qatar)	1–1	(Syria) Al-Karamah
Ali Nasser 16'	(Report)	Iyad Mando 44'

Al Sadd Stadium, Doha, Qatar
Attendance: 2,000
Referee: Chaiwat Kunsuta (Thailand)
9 May 2007

Neftchi (Uzbekistan)	1–1	(Iraq) Najaf FC
Kholmatov 43'	(Report)	Ali Mohammed 60'

Fargona Stadium, Fergana, Uzbekistan
Attendance: 16,000

23 May 2007

Al-Karamah (Syria)	2–0	(Uzbekistan) Neftchi
Iyad Mando 12', 50'	(Report)

Khaled bin Walid Stadium, Homs, Syria
Attendance: 35,000
Referee: Ali Al Mutlaq (Saudi Arabia)
23 May 2007

Najaf FC (Iraq)	1–0	(Qatar) Al Sadd
Saeed Mohsen 78'	(Report)

Sabah Al Salem Stadium, Kuwait City, Kuwait
Referee: Salem Mahmoud Mugjhef (Jordan)

=== Group D ===
Team	Pld	W	D	L	GF	GA	GD	Pts
(Iran) Sepahan	6	4	1	1	12	5	+7	13
(Saudi Arabia) Al-Shabab	6	3	1	2	9	3	+6	10
(United Arab Emirates) Al Ain	6	1	3	2	5	8	−3	6
(Syria) Al-Ittihad	6	0	3	3	3	13	−10	3

Source: afcchampionsleague.com
7 March 2007

Sepahan (Iran)	2–1	(Syria) Al-Ittihad
Mehdi Seyed Salehi 19', 29'	(Report)	Anas Sari 12'

Foolad Shahr Stadium, Isfahan, Iran
Attendance: 25,000
Referee: Saad Kameel Al Fadhli (Kuwait)
7 March 2007

Al Ain (United Arab Emirates)	0–2	(Saudi Arabia) Al-Shabab
	(Report)	Godwin Attram 45'; Waleed Al-Gizani 72'

Sheikh Khalifa International Stadium, Al Ain, UAE
Attendance: 3,500
Referee: Abdullah Al Hilali (Oman)

21 March 2007

Al-Shabab (Saudi Arabia)	0–1	(Iran) Sepahan
	(Report)	Mehdi Seyed Salehi 83'

King Fahd II Stadium, Riyadh, Saudi Arabia
Attendance: 8,000
Referee: Ravshan Irmatov (Uzbekistan)
21 March 2007

Al-Ittihad (Syria)	0–0	(United Arab Emirates) Al Ain
	(Report)

Al-Hamadaniah Stadium, Aleppo, Syria
Attendance: 15,000
Referee: Alaa Abdul-Kadir Nema (Iraq)

11 April 2007

Al-Shabab (Saudi Arabia)	4–0	(Syria) Al-Ittihad
Abdullah Al Dosari 35', 48'; Naji Majrashi 60' (pen.); Waleed Al-Gizanii 79'	(Report)

King Fahd II Stadium, Riyadh, Saudi Arabia
Attendance: 4,000
Referee: Shamsul Maidin (Singapore)
11 April 2007

Al Ain (United Arab Emirates)	3–2	(Iran) Sepahan
Ali Al-Wehaibi 6'; Msalam Faiez 44'; Frank Ongfiang 84'	(Report)	Mehdi Seyed Salehi 8'; Emad Mohammed 65'

Sheikh Khalifa International Stadium, Al Ain, UAE
Attendance: 7,000
Referee: Chaiwat Kunsuta (Thailand)

25 April 2007

Sepahan (Iran)	1–1	(United Arab Emirates) Al Ain
Hossein Papi 49'	(Report)	Hawar Mulla Mohammed 86'

Foolad Shahr Stadium, Isfahan, Iran
Attendance: 25,000
Referee: Mark Shield (Australia)
25 April 2007

Al-Ittihad (Syria)	1–1	(Saudi Arabia) Al-Shabab
Ammar Rihawi 36'	(Report)	Ahmed Ateef 65'

Al-Hamadaniah Stadium, Aleppo, Syria
Attendance: 8,000
Referee: Talaat Najm (Lebanon)

9 May 2007

Al-Shabab (Saudi Arabia)	2–0	(United Arab Emirates) Al Ain
Abdullah Al Astaa 59'; Waleed Al-Gizani 88'	(Report)

King Fahd II Stadium, Riyadh, Saudi Arabia
Attendance: 6,000
Referee: Kwon Jong-Chul (South Korea)
9 May 2007

Al-Ittihad (Syria)	0–5	(Iran) Sepahan
	(Report)	Abdul-Wahab Abu Al-Hail 10'; Mohammad Nori 40', 55'; Emad Mohammed 70', 90'

Al-Hamadaniah Stadium, Aleppo, Syria
Attendance: 2,000
Referee: Lee Gi-Young (South Korea)

23 May 2007

Al Ain (United Arab Emirates)	1–1	(Syria) Al-Ittihad
Ghareeb Hareb 53'	(Report)	Anas Sari 90'

Sheikh Khalifa International Stadium, Al Ain, UAE
Attendance: 2,500
Referee: Huang Junjie (China)
23 May 2007

Sepahan (Iran)	1–0	(Saudi Arabia) Al-Shabab
Mehdi Seyed Salehi 33'	(Report)

Foolad Shahr Stadium, Isfahan, Iran
Attendance: 30,000
Referee: Yuichi Nishimura (Japan)

=== Group E ===
Team	Pld	W	D	L	GF	GA	GD	Pts
(Japan) Urawa Red Diamonds	6	2	4	0	9	5	+4	10
(Australia) Sydney FC	6	2	3	1	8	5	+3	9
(Indonesia) Persik Kediri	6	2	1	3	6	16	−10	7
(China) Shanghai Shenhua	6	1	2	3	7	4	+3	5

7 March 2007

Shanghai Shenhua (China)	1–2	(Australia) Sydney FC
Xie Hui 78'	(Report)	Steve Corica 8'; Ufuk Talay 23'

Yuanshen Stadium, Shanghai, China
Attendance: 12,000
Referee: Lee Gi-Young (South Korea)
7 March 2007

Urawa Red Diamonds (Japan)	3–0	(Indonesia) Persik Kediri
Nobuhisa Yamada 12'; Yuichiro Nagai 45'; Shinji Ono 76'	(Report)

Saitama Stadium, Saitama, Japan
Attendance: 31,303
Referee: Kim Dong-Jin (South Korea)

21 March 2007

Persik Kediri (Indonesia)	1–0	(China) Shanghai Shenhua
Bertha Yuana Putra 71'	(Report)

Manahan Stadium, Surakarta, Indonesia
Attendance: 5,000
Referee: Abdulhameed Ebrahim (Bahrain)
21 March 2007

Sydney FC (Australia)	2–2	(Japan) Urawa Red Diamonds
David Carney 1'; Ufuk Talay 23' (pen.)	(Report)	Robson Ponte 30'; Yuichiro Nagai 55'

Sydney Football Stadium, Sydney, Australia
Attendance: 21,010
Referee: Subkhiddin Mohd Salleh (Malaysia)

11 April 2007

Urawa Red Diamonds (Japan)	1–0	(China) Shanghai Shenhua
Yuki Abe 45'	(Report)

Saitama Stadium, Saitama, Japan
Attendance: 28,828
Referee: Masoud Moradi (Iran)
12 April 2007

Persik Kediri (Indonesia)	2–1	(Australia) Sydney FC
Aris Budi Prasetyo 25'; Budi Sudarsono 70'	(Report)	Steve Corica 8'

Manahan Stadium, Surakarta, Indonesia
Attendance: 15,000
Referee: Abdullah Balideh (Qatar)

25 April 2007

Shanghai Shenhua (China)	0–0	(Japan) Urawa Red Diamonds
	(Report)

Yuanshen Stadium, Shanghai, China
Attendance: 10,000
Referee: Mahmood Al Ghatrifi (Oman)
25 April 2007

Sydney FC (Australia)	3–0	(Indonesia) Persik Kediri
Steve Corica 54', 90'; Alex Brosque 73'	(Report)

Parramatta Stadium, Sydney, Australia
Attendance: 10,075
Referee: Minh Tri Vo (Vietnam)

9 May 2007

Persik Kediri (Indonesia)	3–3	(Japan) Urawa Red Diamonds
Cristian Gonzáles 23' (pen.) 31'; Budi Sudarsono 83'	(Report)	Shinji Ono 9' (pen.); Robson Ponte 50'; Yuki Abe 62'

Manahan Stadium, Surakarta, Indonesia
Attendance: 10,000
Referee: Tayeb Hasan Shamsuzzaman (Bangladesh)
9 May 2007

Sydney FC (Australia)	0–0	(China) Shanghai Shenhua
	(Report 1 2)

Sydney Football Stadium, Sydney, Australia
Attendance: 14,786
Referee: Abdul Bashir (Singapore)

23 May 2007

Urawa Red Diamonds (Japan)	0–0	(Australia) Sydney FC
	(Report)

Saitama Stadium, Saitama, Japan
Attendance: 44,793
Referee: Fareed Al-Marzouqi (United Arab Emirates)
23 May 2007

Shanghai Shenhua (China)	6–0	(Indonesia) Persik Kediri
Xie Hui 8'; Gao Lin 25'; Diego Alonso 79', 87', 90'; Sergio Blanco 86'	(Report)

Yuanshen Stadium, Shanghai, China
Attendance: 8,000
Referee: Subrata Sarkar (India)

=== Group F ===
Team	Pld	W	D	L	GF	GA	GD	Pts
(Japan) Kawasaki Frontale	6	5	1	0	15	4	+11	16
(South Korea) Chunnam Dragons	6	3	1	2	7	8	−1	10
(Indonesia) Arema Malang	6	1	1	4	2	9	−7	4
(Thailand) Bangkok University	6	0	3	3	4	7	−3	3

7 March 2007

Bangkok University (Thailand)	0–0	(South Korea) Chunnam Dragons
	(Report)

Thai-Japanese Stadium, Bangkok, Thailand
Attendance: 2,000
Referee: Matthew Breeze (Australia)
7 March 2007

Arema Malang (Indonesia)	1–3	(Japan) Kawasaki Frontale
Elie Aiboy 12'	(Report)	Magnum 1', 73'; Kengo Nakamura 82'

Gajayana Stadium, Malang, Indonesia
Attendance: 30,000
Referee: Naser Al-Ghafary (Jordan)

21 March 2007

Chunnam Dragons (South Korea)	2–0	(Indonesia) Arema Malang
Kim Tae-Su 48'; Sandro Cardoso 82'	(Report)

Gwang-Yang Stadium, Gwangyang, South Korea
Attendance: 3,000
Referee: Huang Junjie (China)
21 March 2007

Kawasaki Frontale (Japan)	1–1	(Thailand) Bangkok University
Patiparn Phetphun 78' (o.g.)	(Report)	Suriya Domtaisong 7'

Todoroki Athletics Stadium, Kawasaki, Japan
Attendance: 10,816
Referee: Shamsul Maidin (Singapore)

11 April 2007

Chunnam Dragons (South Korea)	1–3	(Japan) Kawasaki Frontale
Kang Min-Soo 90'	(Report)	Juninho 29' (pen.) 70'; Magnum 57'

Gwang-Yang Stadium, Gwangyang, South Korea
Attendance: 5,703
Referee: Khalil Al Ghamdi (Saudi Arabia)
11 April 2007

Bangkok University (Thailand)	0–0	(Indonesia) Arema Malang
	(Report)

Royal Thai Army Stadium, Bangkok, Thailand
Attendance: 1,500
Referee: Kadyrbek Chynybekov (Kyrgyzstan)

25 April 2007

Arema Malang (Indonesia)	1–0	(Thailand) Bangkok University
Bruno Casimir 56'	(Report)

Gajayana Stadium, Malang, Indonesia
Attendance: 10,000
Referee: Sun Baojie (China)
25 April 2007

Kawasaki Frontale (Japan)	3–0	(South Korea) Chunnam Dragons
Juninho 25'; Chong Tese 81', 87'	(Report)

Todoroki Athletics Stadium, Kawasaki, Japan
Attendance: 10,070
Referee: Ben Williams (Australia)

9 May 2007

Chunnam Dragons (South Korea)	3–2	(Thailand) Bangkok University
Kim Seung-Hyun 28'; Song Tae-Lim 79', 90'	(Report)	Kittisak Siriwaen 11'; Kraisorn Pancharoen 39'

Gwang-Yang Stadium, Gwangyang, South Korea
Attendance: 1,000
Referee: Abdul Neman
9 May 2007

Kawasaki Frontale (Japan)	3–0	(Indonesia) Arema Malang
Kengo Nakamura 4', 70'; Taku Harada 80'	(Report)

Todoroki Athletics Stadium, Kawasaki, Japan
Attendance: 9,453
Referee: Minh Tri Vo (Vietnam)

23 May 2007

Bangkok University (Thailand)	1–2	(Japan) Kawasaki Frontale
Ekkaphan Petvises 40'	(Report)	Taku Harada 17'; Takahisa Nishiyama 63'

Royal Thai Army Stadium, Bangkok, Thailand
Referee: Rosdi Shaharul (Malaysia)
23 May 2007

Arema Malang (Indonesia)	0–1	(South Korea) Chunnam Dragons
	(Report)	Ju Kwang-Youn 47'

Gajayana Stadium, Malang, Indonesia
Attendance: 5,000
Referee: Mahmood Al Ghatrifi (Oman)

=== Group G ===
Team	Pld	W	D	L	GF	GA	GD	Pts
(South Korea) Seongnam Ilhwa Chunma	6	4	1	1	13	6	+7	13
(China) Shandong Luneng Taishan	6	4	1	1	12	8	+4	13
(Australia) Adelaide United	6	2	2	2	9	6	+3	8
(Vietnam) Gach Dong Tam Long An	6	0	0	6	4	18	−14	0

7 March 2007

Adelaide United (Australia)	0–1	(China) Shandong Luneng Taishan
	(Report)	Michael Valkanis 47' (o.g.)

Hindmarsh Stadium, Adelaide, Australia
Attendance: 7,645
Referee: Satop Tongkhan (Thailand)
7 March 2007

Seongnam Ilhwa Chunma (South Korea)	4–1	(Vietnam) Gach Dong Tam Long An
Mota 9', 69' (pen.); Kim Dong-hyun 70'; Adrian Neaga 81'	(Report)	Kabanga Tshamala 87'

Seongnam 2 Stadium, Seongnam, South Korea
Attendance: 300
Referee: Dilovarshokh Orzuev (Tajikistan)

21 March 2007

Shandong Luneng Taishan (China)	2–1	(South Korea) Seongnam Ilhwa Chunma
Aleksandar Živković 62' (pen.); Wang Yongpo 78'	(Report)	Cho Byung-Kuk 77'

Shandong Stadium, Jinan, China
Attendance: 25,000
Referee: Talaat Najm (Lebanon)
21 March 2007

Gach Dong Tam Long An (Vietnam)	0–2	(Australia) Adelaide United
	(Report)	Fernando 18'; Travis Dodd 30'

Long An Stadium, Tân An, Vietnam
Attendance: 10,000
Referee: Ali Saleem (Maldives)

11 April 2007

Shandong Luneng Taishan (China)	4–0	(Vietnam) Gach Dong Tam Long An
Han Peng 42', 52'; Wang Yongpo 54'; Li Jinyu 74'	(Report)

Shandong Stadium, Jinan, China
Attendance: 25,000
Referee: Win Cho (Myanmar)
11 April 2007

Adelaide United (Australia)	2–2	(South Korea) Seongnam Ilhwa Chunma
Fernando 48'; Bruce Djite 55'	(Report)	Kim Dong-hyun 57'; Mota 75'

Hindmarsh Stadium, Adelaide, Australia
Attendance: 9,093
Referee: Subkhiddin Mohd Salleh (Malaysia)

25 April 2007

Seongnam Ilhwa Chunma (South Korea)	1–0	(Australia) Adelaide United
Choi Sung-Kuk 29'	(Report)

Seongnam 2 Stadium, Seongnam, South Korea
Attendance: 2000
Referee: Muhsen Basma (Syria)
25 April 2007

Gach Dong Tam Long An (Vietnam)	2–3	(China) Shandong Luneng Taishan
Kabanga Tshamala 14'; Nguyễn Việt Thắng 36'	(Report)	Wang Yongpo 29'; Li Jinyu 49', 90'

Long An Stadium, Tân An, Vietnam
Attendance: 10,000
Referee: Mohamed Al Saeedi (United Arab Emirates)

9 May 2007

Shandong Luneng Taishan (China)	2–2	(Australia) Adelaide United
Li Wei 39'; Shu Chang 56'	(Report)	Fernando 36' (pen.); Nathan Burns 48'

Shandong Stadium, Jinan, China
Attendance: 30,000
Referee: Khalil Al Ghamdi (Saudi Arabia)
9 May 2007

Gach Dong Tam Long An (Vietnam)	1–2	(South Korea) Seongnam Ilhwa Chunma
Phan Van Tai Em 45'	(Report)	Mota 17'; Choi Sung-Kuk 83'

Long An Stadium, Tân An, Vietnam
Attendance: 5,000

23 May 2007

Adelaide United (Australia)	3–0	(Vietnam) Gach Dong Tam Long An
Travis Dodd 7', 22', 49'	(Report)

Hindmarsh Stadium, Adelaide, Australia
Attendance: 6,917
Referee: Abdul Bashir (Singapore)
23 May 2007

Seongnam Ilhwa Chunma (South Korea)	3–0	(China) Shandong Luneng Taishan
Kim Dong-hyun 37'; Son Dae-Ho 42'; Mota 71'	(Report)

Seongnam 2 Stadium, Seongnam, South Korea
Attendance: 13,243
Referee: Masoud Moradi (Iran)

== Knock-out stage ==
=== Bracket ===
Quarter finals
(Iran) Sepahan (p)	0	0	0 (5)
(Japan) Kawasaki Frontale	0	0	0 (4)
(United Arab Emirates) Al-Wahda (a)	0	1	1
(Saudi Arabia) Al-Hilal	0	1	1
(South Korea) Seognam Ilhwa Chunma	2	2	4
(Syria) Al-Karamah	1	0	1
(Japan) Urawa Red Diamonds	2	2	4
(South Korea) Jeonbuk Hyundai Motors	1	0	1

Semi-finals
(Iran) Sepahan	3	0	3
(United Arab Emirates) Al-Wahda	1	0	1
(South Korea) Seongnam Ilhwa Chunma	2	2	4 (3)
(Japan) Urawa Red Diamonds (p)	2	2	4 (5)

Final
(Iran) Sepahan	1	0	1
(Japan) Urawa Red Diamonds	1	2	3

=== Quarter-finals ===
Team 1	Agg.	Team 2	1st leg	2nd leg
Sepahan (Iran)	0–0 (5–4p)	(Japan) Kawasaki Frontale	0–0	0–0 (a.e.t.)
Al-Wahda (United Arab Emirates)	1–1 (a)	(Saudi Arabia) Al-Hilal	0–0	1–1
Seognam Ilhwa Chunma (South Korea)	4–1	(Syria) Al-Karamah	2–1	2–0
Urawa Red Diamonds (Japan)	4–1	(South Korea) Jeonbuk Hyundai Motors (2006 Champion)	2–1	2–0

==== First leg ====
19 September 2007

Sepahan (Iran)	0–0	(Japan) Kawasaki Frontale
	Report

Foolad Shahr Stadium, Isfahan, Iran
Attendance: 25,000
Referee: Jasim Karim (Bahrain)

19 September 2007

Al-Wahda (United Arab Emirates)	0–0	(Saudi Arabia) Al-Hilal
	Report

Al-Nahyan Stadium, Abu Dhabi, UAE
Attendance: 12,000
Referee: Abdullah Balideh (Qatar)

19 September 2007

Seongnam Ilhwa Chunma (South Korea)	2–1	(Syria) Al-Karamah
Kim Min-ho 72'; Cho Byung-Kuk 74'	Report	Senghor Koupouleni 9'

Seongnam 2 Stadium, Seongnam, South Korea
Attendance: 1,300
Referee: Hedayat Mombini (Iran)

19 September 2007

Urawa Red Diamonds (Japan)	2–1	(South Korea) Jeonbuk Hyundai Motors
Makoto Hasebe 4'; Tatsuya Tanaka 59'	Report	Choi Jin-cheul 90'

Saitama Stadium, Saitama, Japan
Attendance: 33,103
Referee: Salem Mahmoud Mujghef (Jordan)

==== Second leg ====
26 September 2007

Kawasaki Frontale (Japan)	0–0	(Iran) Sepahan
	Report
Penalties
Juninho (penalty scored); Kazuki Ganaha (penalty scored); Masahiro Ohashi (penalty scored); Hiroyuki Taniguchi (penalty missed); Shuhei Terada (penalty scored)	4–5	(penalty scored) Hadi Aghili; (penalty scored) Moharram Navidkia; (penalty scored) Abu Al-Hail; (penalty scored) Farshad Bahadorani; (penalty scored) Jalal Akbari

Todoroki Athletics Stadium, Kawasaki, Japan
Attendance: 13,507
Referee: Saad Kameel Al Fadhli (Kuwait)
- Sepahan progress 5–4 on penalties after 0–0 aggregate score

26 September 2007

Al-Hilal (Saudi Arabia)	1–1	(United Arab Emirates) Al-Wahda
Tarik El Taib 85'	Report	Ismail Matar 18'

King Fahd International Stadium, Riyadh, Saudi Arabia
- Al-Wahda progress on away goals rule with 1–1 aggregate score

26 September 2007

Al-Karamah (Syria)	0–2	(South Korea) Seongnam Ilhwa Chunma
	Report	Mota 9'; Kim Dong-hyun 71'

Khaled bin Walid Stadium, Homs, Syria
- Seongnam Ilhwa Chunma progress 4–1 on aggregate

26 September 2007

Jeonbuk Hyundai Motors (South Korea)	0–2	(Japan) Urawa Red Diamonds
	Report	Tatsuya Tanaka 3'; Choi Jin-cheul 66' (o.g.)

Jeonju World Cup Stadium, Jeonju, South Korea
Referee: Khalil Al Ghamdi (Saudi Arabia)
- Urawa Red Diamonds progress 4–1 on aggregate

=== Semi-finals ===
Team 1	Agg.	Team 2	1st leg	2nd leg
Sepahan (Iran)	3–1	(United Arab Emirates) Al-Wahda	3–1	0–0
Seongnam Ilhwa Chunma (South Korea)	4–4 (3–5p)	(Japan) Urawa Red Diamonds	2–2	2–2 (a.e.t.)

==== First leg ====
3 October 2007

Seongnam Ilhwa Chunma (South Korea)	2–2	(Japan) Urawa Red Diamonds
Mota 10'; Kim Do-Heon 80'	Report	Tatsuya Tanaka 52'; Robson Ponte 65' (pen.)

Seongnam 2 Stadium, Seongnam, South Korea
Referee: Abdulrahman Abdou (Qatar)

3 October 2007

Sepahan (Iran)	3–1	(United Arab Emirates) Al-Wahda
Mahmoud Karimi 11', 58'; Moharram Navidkia 85' (pen.)	Report	Mohamed Al Shehhi 48'

Foolad Shahr Stadium, Isfahan, Iran
Referee: Abdul Bashir (Singapore)

==== Second leg ====
24 October 2007

Urawa Red Diamonds (Japan)	2–2	(South Korea) Seongnam Ilhwa Chunma
Washington 21'; Makoto Hasebe 73'	Report	Choi Sung-Kuk 56'; Kim Dong-hyun 69'
Penalties
Robson Ponte (penalty scored); Washington (penalty scored); Yuki Abe (penalty scored); Yuichiro Nagai (penalty scored); Tadaaki Hirakawa (penalty scored)	5–3	(penalty scored) Kim Sang-Sik; (penalty missed) Choi Sung-Kuk; (penalty scored) Kim Dong-hyun; (penalty scored) Park Jin-Sub

Saitama Stadium, Saitama, Japan
Attendance: 51,651
Referee: Saad Kameel Al Fadhli (Kuwait)
- Urawa Red Diamonds progress 5–3 on penalties after 4–4 aggregate score

24 October 2007

Al-Wahda (United Arab Emirates)	0–0	(Iran) Sepahan
	Report

Al-Nahyan Stadium, Abu Dhabi, UAE
Attendance: 13,000
Referee: Ben Williams (Australia)
- Sepahan progress 3–1 on aggregate

=== Final ===
Team 1	Agg.	Team 2	1st leg	2nd leg
Sepahan (Iran)	1–3	(Japan) Urawa Red Diamonds	1–1	0–2

==== First leg ====
7 November 2007

Sepahan (Iran)	1–1	(Japan) Urawa Red Diamonds
Mahmoud Karimi 47'	Report	Robson Ponte 45'

Foolad Shahr Stadium, Isfahan, Iran
Attendance: 30,000
Referee: Subkhiddin Mohd Salleh (Malaysia)

==== Second leg ====
14 November 2007

Urawa Red Diamonds (Japan)	2–0	(Iran) Sepahan
Yuichiro Nagai 22'; Yuki Abe 71'	Report

Saitama Stadium, Saitama, Japan
Attendance: 59,034
Referee: Ravshan Irmatov (Uzbekistan)
- Urawa Red Diamonds win 3–1 on aggregate

== Top scorers ==
Rank	Player	Club	Goals
1	(Brazil) Mota	(South Korea) Seongnam Ilhwa Chunma	7
2	(South Korea) Kim Dong-hyun	(South Korea) Seongnam Ilhwa Chunma	5
2	(Iran) Mehdi Seyed Salehi	(Iran) Sepahan	5
4	(Brazil) Rodrigão	(Saudi Arabia) Al-Hilal	4
4	(Syria) Firas Al Khatib	(Kuwait) Al-Arabi	4
4	(Iraq) Saeed Mohsen	(Iraq) Najaf FC	4
4	(Australia) Steve Corica	(Australia) Sydney FC	4
4	(Australia) Travis Dodd	(Australia) Adelaide United	4
4	(Brazil) Robson Ponte	(Japan) Urawa Red Diamonds	4
10	(Brazil) Magnum	(Japan) Kawasaki Frontale	3
10	(Brazil) Juninho	(Japan) Kawasaki Frontale	3
10	(Japan) Kengo Nakamura	(Japan) Kawasaki Frontale	3
10	(China) Wang Yongpo	(China) Shandong Luneng Taishan	3
10	(China) Li Jinyu	(China) Shandong Luneng Taishan	3
10	(Iraq) Emad Mohammed	(Iran) Sepahan	3
10	(Iran) Mahmoud Karimi	(Iran) Sepahan	3
10	(Mali) Mamadou Bagayoko	(United Arab Emirates) Al-Wahda	3
10	(Saudi Arabia) Waleed Al-Gizani	(Saudi Arabia) Al-Shabab	3
10	(Uruguay) Diego Alonso	(China) Shanghai Shenhua	3
10	(Brazil) Fernando	(Australia) Adelaide United	3
10	(Syria) Iyad Mando	(Syria) Al-Karamah	3
10	(Senegal) Senghor Koupouleni	(Syria) Al-Karamah	3
10	(Japan) Tatsuya Tanaka	(Japan) Urawa Red Diamonds	3
10	(Japan) Yuichiro Nagai	(Japan) Urawa Red Diamonds	3
10	(Japan) Yuki Abe	(Japan) Urawa Red Diamonds	3
10	(South Korea) Choi Sung-Kuk	(South Korea) Seongnam Ilhwa Chunma	3

== See also ==
- 2007 FIFA Club World Cup
