= List of people assassinated by the People's Mojahedin of Iran =

The following is a list of notable people assassinated by the People's Mujahedin of Iran.

== Iranian government officials and political figures ==
=== Heads of government branches ===
- Mohammad-Ali Rajai (30 August 1981) – President of Iran
- Mohammad-Javad Bahonar (30 August 1981) – Prime Minister of Iran

=== Members of Parliament ===
- Reza Kamyab (28 July 1981) – Mashhad
- Mojtaba Ozbaki (23 December 1981) – Shahrekord
- Mohammad-Taqi Besharat (28 December 1981) – Semirom
- Mojtaba Esteki (21 January 1982) – MP

=== Military and police officers ===
- Brigadier General Saeed Taheri (13 August 1972) – Chief of Police of Tehran
- Brigadier General Reza Zandipoor (29 March 1975) – Chief of Anti-sabotage Joint Committee Prison
- Seyyed Naser Mohsenpur (24 August 1981) – IRGC officer
- General Zandipour (March 1975) – a warden assassinated at the Anti-sabotage Joint Committee prison

=== Other Iranian officials ===
- Iranian employee at Embassy of the United States, Tehran (3 July 1975)
- Malek Boroujerdi (23 December 1978) – Iranian Oilfield Services Company (IOSC) employee
- Mohammad-Ali Ansari (6 July 1981) – Governor of Gilan province
- Ali Qoddousi (5 September 1981) – Military prosecutor-general
- Mir Asadollah Madani (11 September 1981) – Supreme leader's representative in East Azerbaijan province
- Hassan Ayat (5 August 1981) – Iranian politician, member of Parliament of Iran in first assembly after the Iranian revolution, member of Assembly of Experts for Constitution
- Abdol Hossein Dastgheib (11 December 1981) – Supreme leader's representative in Fars province, he and several others killed in a suicide attack in Shiraz during Friday prayers
- Gholamali Jaaffarzadeh (23 December 1981) – Governor of Mashhad County
- Mohammad-Salim Hosni (14 March 1982) – Reconstruction Crusade official
- Ali-Mohammad Sadduqi (2 July 1982) – Supreme leader's representative in Yazd province
- Assassination of a senior cleric in Tehran (26 February 1982)
- Ata'ollah Ashrafi Esfahani (15 October 1982) – Supreme leader's representative in Kermanshah province
- Hussein Ghane-Ghole (6 January 1987) – Warden of Mashhad prison
- Jamshid Ghare-Sarvari (13 February 1987) – Warden of Ahvaz prison
- Asadollah Lajevardi (23 August 1998) – Former warden of Evin Prison
- A senior cleric (June 1998) assassinated in Najaf, Iraq
- A senior IRGC commander (1 May 2000) assassinated in Tehran

== Turkish citizens ==
- Çağlar Yücel (12 December 1993) – A diplomat at the embassy of Turkey in Iraq

== Attempted Islamic Republic targets ==
=== Heads of government branches ===
- Ali Khamenei (15 March 1985) – President of Iran
- Mohammad Khatami (5 February 2000) – President of Iran

=== Members of Parliament ===
- Habibollah Asgaroladi (20 July 1981) – Tehran
- Hadi Khamenei (11 February 1987) – Mashhad

=== Military and police officers ===
- Brigadier General Mohsen Rafighdoost (14 September 1998) – Head of Mostazafan Foundation
- Major General Yahya Rahim Safavi (13 March 2000) – Commander-in-Chief of the Islamic Revolutionary Guard Corps
- Brigadier General Mohammad Baqer Ghalibaf (7 January 2001) – Chief of Police of Iran

=== Other Iranian officials ===
- Ahmad Khomeini (15 June 1982) – Eldest son of the Supreme leader
- Mohammad Va'ez Abaee-Khorasani (22 April 1994) – Member of the Assembly of Experts from Khorasan province
- Mohammed Raisi (6 July 1997) – Diplomat at Iranian Embassy in Madrid, Spain
- Ali Razini (5 January 1999) – Head of Tehran's judiciary

== Islamic Republic of Iran assassinations allegations against the MEK ==
- Seyyed Hasan Beheshti (23 July 1981) – Islamic Republican Party's candidate for the parliamentary elections
- Mousa Kalantari (28 June 1981) – Minister of Housing
- Abdulkarim Hasheminejad (29 September 1981) – Mashhad
- Major General Ali Sayyad Shirazi (10 April 1999) – Deputy Chief of the General Staff of Iranian Armed Forces
- Mohammad Kachui (29 June 1981) – Warden of Evin Prison
- Mahmoud Ghandi (28 June 1981) – Minister of Post, Telegraph and Telephone
- Hassan Abbaspour (28 June 1981) – Minister of Energy
- Mohammad-Ali Fayyazbakhsh (28 June 1981) – Minister without portfolio
- Colonel Houshang Vahid-Dastjerdi (5 September 1981) – Chief of Police of Iran
- Mohammad Montazeri (28 June 1981) – Najafabad
- Mohammad Chavoushi (8 March 1982) – Chief of the political and ideological office of the Islamic Republic of Iran Navy

== Disputed assassinations ==
- Gholam-Hussein Haghani (28 June 1981) – Bandar Abbas
- Fakhreddin Rahimi (28 June 1981) – Malavi
- Abbas-Ali Nateq-Nouri (28 June 1981) – Nour
- Mohammad Beheshti (28 June 1981) – Chief Justice of Iran
- Paul E. Grimm (killed 23 December 1978) – Iranian Oilfield Services Company (IOSC) employee
- On 28 June 1981, a bomb detonated at the Islamic Republican Party headquarters in Tehran killed 73, including the party's secretary-general, 4 cabinet ministers, 10 vice ministers and 27 members of the Parliament of Iran. See Hafte Tir bombing
- Lieutenant colonel Lewis L. Hawkins (2 June 1973) – United States Army military adviser in Iran (the Washington Post reported that the leader of the group, Vahid Afrakhteh, one of the founders of Peykar, stated that he personally killed col. Lewis Lee Hawkins in Tehran in 1973.[p.A9]).
- Colonel Paul R. Shaffer (21 May 1975) – United States Air Force military adviser in Iran.
- Lieutenant colonel Jack H. Turner (21 May 1975) – United States Air Force military adviser in Iran
- Robert R. Krongrad, William C. Cottrell, Jr., Donald G. Smith (28 August 1976) – they assassinated by four gunmen on their way to Doshan Tappeh Air Base to work on Project IBEX.

== See also ==
- Assassination and terrorism in Iran § Attacks by Mujahedin-e-Khalq
- Camp Ashraf
