= Pouran Bazargan =

Iranian activist (1937–2007)

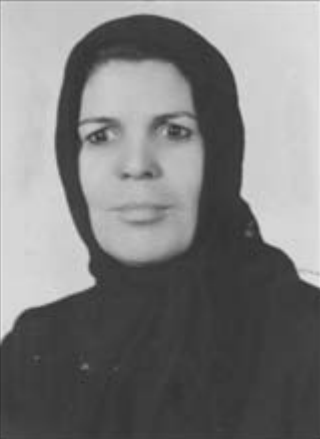
- Born: Pourandokht Bazargan; 1937; Mashhad, Imperial State of Iran
- Died: 6 March 2007 (aged 69–70); Paris, France
- Political party: People's Mojahedin (1967–79); Peykar (1979–82)
- Spouse: Mohammad Hanifnejad (m. 1968; died 1972) Torab Haghshenas (m. 1974–2007)

Pourandokht "Pouran" Bazargan (Persian: پوراندخت (پوران) بازرگان) was an Iranian teacher, revolutionary and translator. She was notably the first female member of the People's Mojahedin Organization of Iran (MEK).

== Biography ==
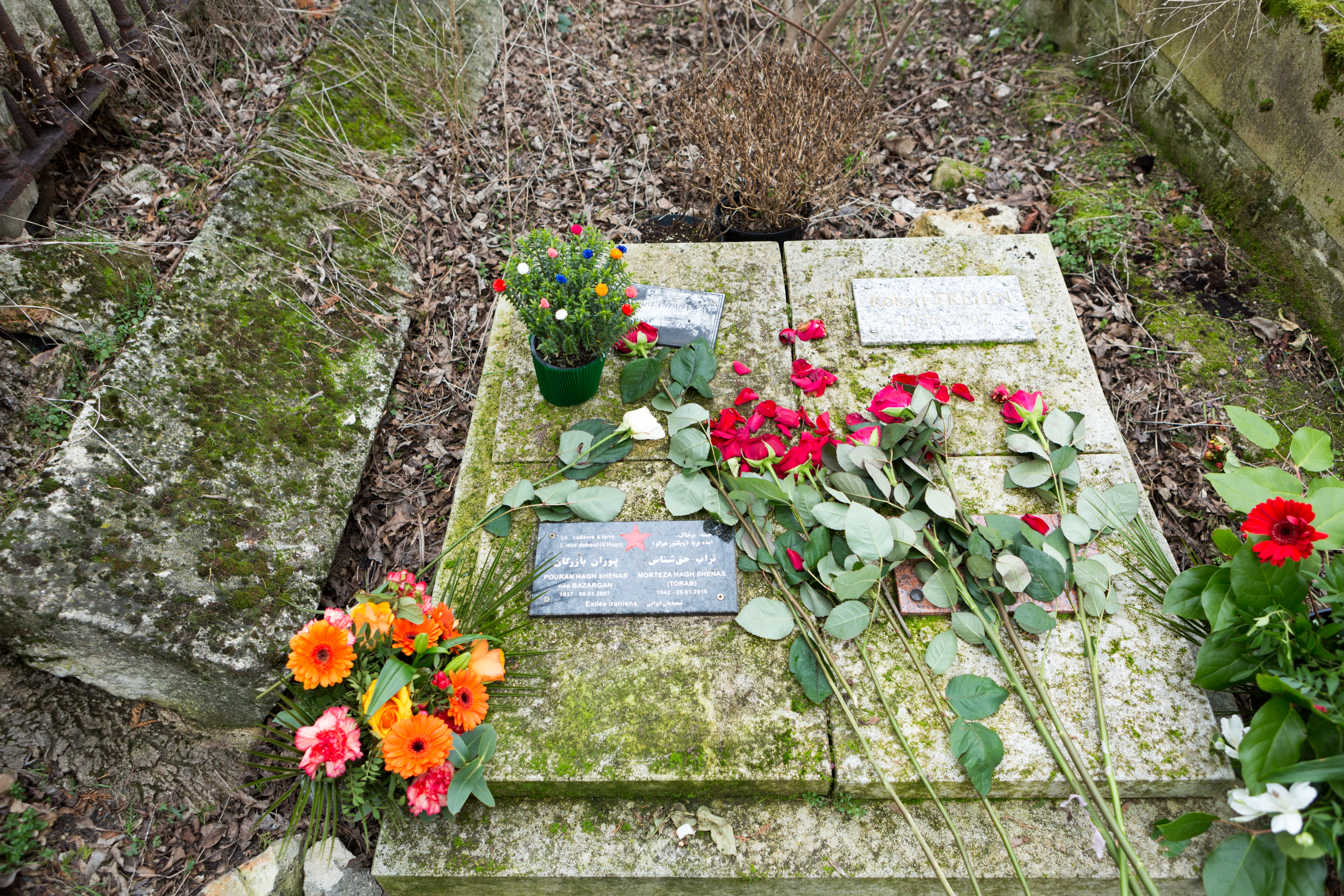
Père-Lachaise Cemetery

Bazargan was born to a middle-class family in the city of Mashhad and was brought up as a devout Muslim. As an adult she became principal of Refah School, a girls school in Tehran. In the 1960s, she began her political activism within a religious organization opposed to Mohammad Reza Shah. Bazargan joined the MEK as its first female member, and married Mohammad Hanifnejad, a co-founder of the group. Bazargan was a regular of Ali Shariati speeches at Hosseiniyeh Ershad and was personally in touch with him. According to Ali Rahnema, Shariaiti who knew that Bazargan was associated with the MEK, introduced Simin Jariri to her.

Bazargan left Iran in 1981 after government crackdowns of political activists, and resided in a number of countries, including Syria, Lebanon and Turkey, to act as a liaison for the group. In 1974, after the death of Hanifnezhad, she married fellow MEK member Torab Haghshenas. In 1975, she sided with the Organization of Struggle for the Emancipation of the Working Class. Among her family members in the MEK, only her sister converted to Marxism while her brother Mansour Bazargan (who had been imprisoned since 1972 in Iran) and sister-in-law Fatemeh Amini (who died under torture refusing to betray her MEK colleagues to Iranian authorities) remained Muslims and associates of the Islamic faction.

After the Iranian Revolution, Bazargan continued her support for the communist Organization of Struggle for the Emancipation of the Working Class, pursuing her political activity in exile. She was the widow of the MEK's martyr and co-founder, as well as being the first woman to join the MEK. She was also employed at the Palestinian Red Crescent Hospital in Damascus and in the Sadra refugee camp in Beirut. In exile, Bazargan translated many works from French, English and Arabic with her husband Torab Haghshenas and launched a website name Peykar Andisheh. The couple espoused a more internationalist view and became critical of armed struggle because they believed guerrilla movements were isolated from the workers' movement.

Bazargan died of a "long illness" on 6 March 2007.
