= Edna Sabet =

Persian activist (1955–1982)

- Born: 1955; Tehran, Iran
- Died: 1982; Tehran, Iran
- Other names: Pary Sabet, comrade Pary, Zohreh, Tahereh
- Occupations: Political activist, Guerilla warfare
- Years active: 1972-1982
- Known for: leading member of Organization of Iranian People's Fedai Guerrillas, PMOI, Peykar

Edna Sabet (Persian: ادنا ثابت) was a political communist activist and prisoner in Iran. She was a member of Organization of Iranian People's Fedai Guerrillas and later Organization of Struggle for the Emancipation of the Working Class or simply Peykar. She was active in the revolution against Shah but executed shortly after the revolution on 1982.

== Early life ==
Edna was born to a wealthy Jewish family from Kermanshah. Her family immigrated to Tehran in 1920's. She was born in 1955 in Tehran. She had two sisters and two brothers. Most of her family were US trained engineers. Her father, a wealthy Jewish businessman was the owner of an airplane manufacturing plant. He later closed the plant and started a exhaust systems manufacturing plant with two of Edna's brothers. Some of the family members had converted to Baha'i and Muslim faiths in order to improve their financial conditions, but her parents remained steady in their Jewishness. Although born in a Jewish family, she was relatively secular and was not interested in religion.

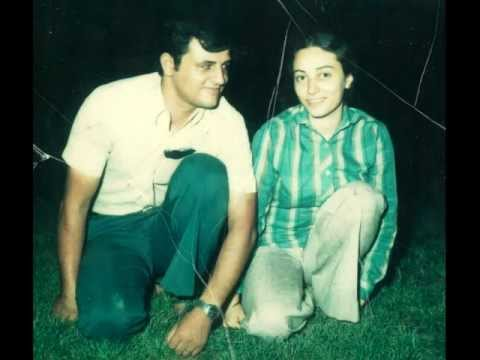
Edna Sabet and her husband, Ghulamhossein Aruni.

== Early activities ==
Edna entered Sharif University of Technology, then known as Aryamehr university in 1972 majoring in mechanical engineering. Two years into her studies she joined the Organization of Iranian People's Fedai Guerrillas. She travelled abroad two times in the same year. Some sources say she travelled to England both times, while others claim she travelled to Israel first and England in the second time. Upon return she did not notify her parents about her return to Iran and went straight from Airport to one of the Fedaian Guerrillas houses. She was known as "Pary" or "Comrade Pary" in the Guerrillas.

In 1977 it was rumored that Sabet and Abdullah Panjehshahi, another member of the organization, were having an affair. Panjehshahi was summoned to Mashhad by the organization and was murdered there. While most sources believe that Panjehshahi was murdered by the Fedaii leadership for neglecting the rules about relationships, Fedaii members claim that Panjehshahi was murdered by the Savak. Details of his murder were never revealed by Sabet or others.

=== Joining Peykar ===
Sabet joined Peykar in 1978. She quickly rose through the ranks and became one of the leading members of the group. She met her future husband, Ghulamhossein Aruni and later married him. Aruni later joined PMOI (MEK) in 1979 and Edna followed in his footsteps. Their love story was famous among the PMOI members.

=== After the revolution ===
Although PMOI joined other forces during the revolution, shortly after they were banned and conflict between them and Islamist revolutionaries quickly escalated.

=== Arrest and execution ===
Aruni was arrested and executed in 1981 by Islamic Revolutionary Guard Corps. Shortly after his execution, Edna was arrested and was found guilty in revolutionary courts and was sentenced to execution by Sadegh Khalkhali. According to many sources she was imprisoned and tortured for a year before execution in 1982.

One of the members of the PMOI described her as: "she was everything islamic republic was afraid of, a brave woman, a jew, a leftist which made war against the core of the islamic republic."

She was of the few Jews which openly joined a Marxist-Islamist organization.
