= Torab Haghshenas =

Iranian revolutionary, author and translator (1942–2016)

- Born: 1942; Jahrom, Iran
- Died: 27 January 2016 (aged 73–74); Paris, France
- Resting place: Père Lachaise Cemetery
- Other names: Torab Dadar; Morteza Haghshenas
- Political party: Freedom Movement (1961–65); People's Mojahedin (1965–79); Peykar (1979–82)
- Spouse: Pouran Bazargan (m. 1974; died 2007)

Torab Haghshenas (Persian: تراب حق‌شناس) was an Iranian revolutionary, author and translator. Haghshenas who was notably the only People's Mojahedin Organization of Iran (MEK) leader with seminary education, sided with the group's Marxist faction in 1975 and co-founded the Organization of Struggle for the Emancipation of the Working Class in 1979.

== Early life and education ==
Haghshenas was born into a religious family in 1942 in the city of Jahrom. He had a clerical background, with his father being a small farmer with clerical education and his uncle a mosque preacher. He completed school in his birthplace and went to Qom to study Arabic and Islamic theology in seminary. After three years of study in Qom, he moved to Tehran and studied English language as a student of the Teachers College.

== Career ==
Haghshenas was one the early members of the MEK and soon became as senior figure in the group as one of the ten on its Ideological Team. He was the only member who had received clerical education and co-authored multiple MEK handbooks and pamphlets. In 1968, he became member of the sixteen-man MEK Central Cadre.

Haghshenas was on the first batch of MEK members who were sent to the Palestine Liberation Organization (PLO) camps for guerilla training. In 1970, he spent months in PLO camps in Lebanon and Jordan, starting in June. He survived the blow to the organization in 1971 because he was on a mission abroad. As a result, he remained outside Iran. Along with his friend Hossein Ahmadi-Rouhani, Haghshenas traveled extensively to establish contact and strengthen ties between the MEK and foreigners, including the PLO, the Libyan regime under Muammar Gaddafi and the People's Democratic Republic of Yemen. Haghshenas also acted as a liaison with other Iranian dissidents abroad, including the Confederation of Iranian Students, various factions of the National Front, as well as a circle of Ruhollah Khomeini disciples in Iraq who emerged as the Combatant Clergy Association. He led the MEK delegations who met with Khomeini in Najaf, twice in 1972 and 1974, to obtain his endorsement and public support of the MEK to no avail. Haghshenas married Pouran Bazargan, the widow of MEK co-founder Mohammad Hanifnejad, in 1974. In 1975, played a key role in the birth of a Marxist faction within the MEK.

After the Iranian Revolution, he was a leading figure in the Organization of Struggle for the Emancipation of the Working Class, which he had co-founded. He returned to Iran and worked as the editor of the group's newspaper Peykar, until the group was suppressed. He fled the country in 1982 and lived in exile with his wife for the rest of his life. The couple launched a website name Peykar Andisheh and espoused a more internationalist view, becoming critical of armed struggle because they believed guerrilla movements were isolated from the workers' movement.

=== Works ===
He translated many works from French, English and Arabic into Persian, among the latter were poems by Mahmoud Darwish. Haghshenas wrote an entry for Encyclopædia Iranica on history of communism in Iran after 1953.

== Death ==
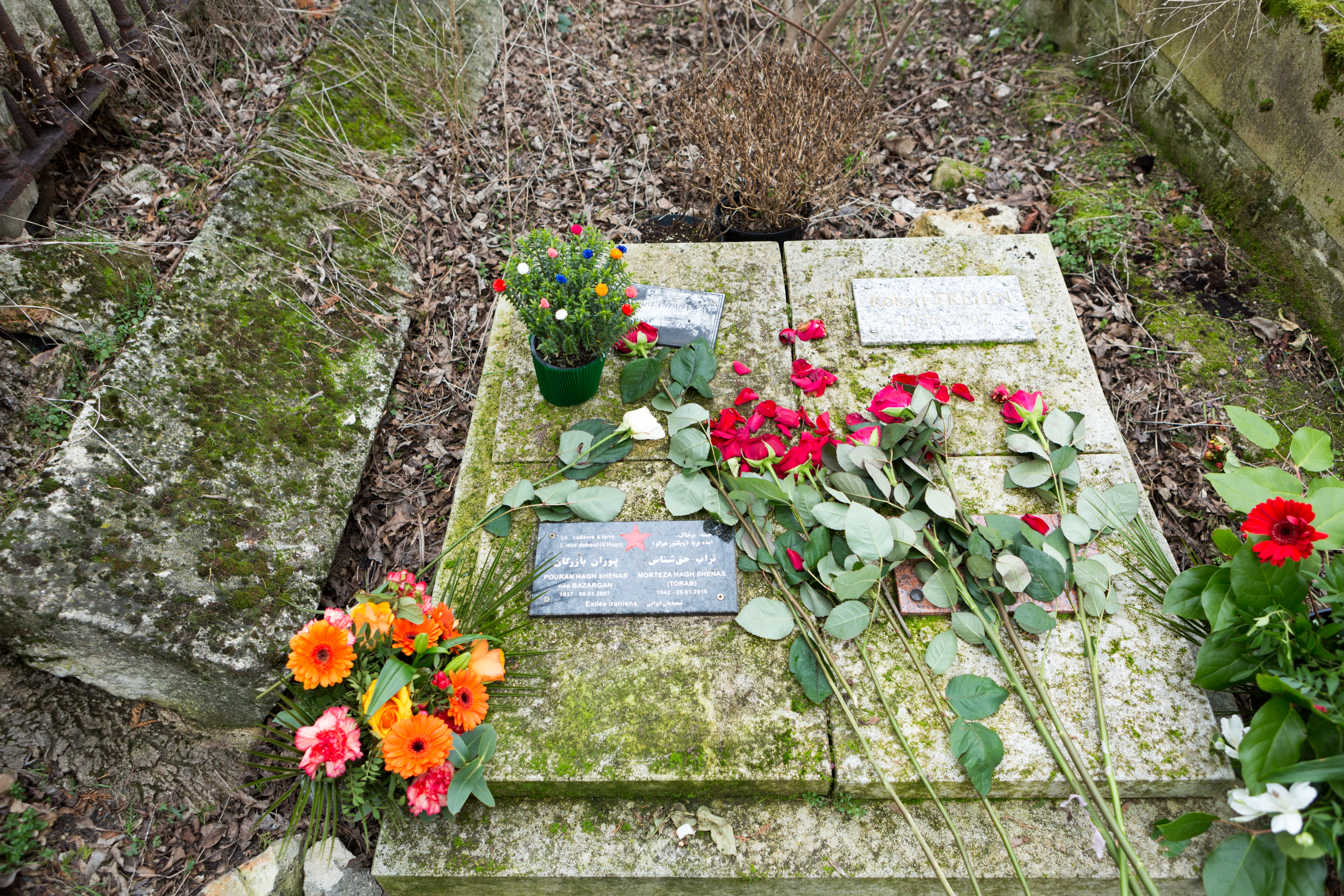
Père Lachaise Cemetery

Haghshenas died on 27 January 2016 in a hospital on the outskirts of Paris and was buried at the Père Lachaise Cemetery alongside his wife. His funeral was attended by some 400 left-wing activists from different nationalities.
