= Assassination of Paul R. Shaffer and John H. Turner =

1975 murders in Tehran, Iran

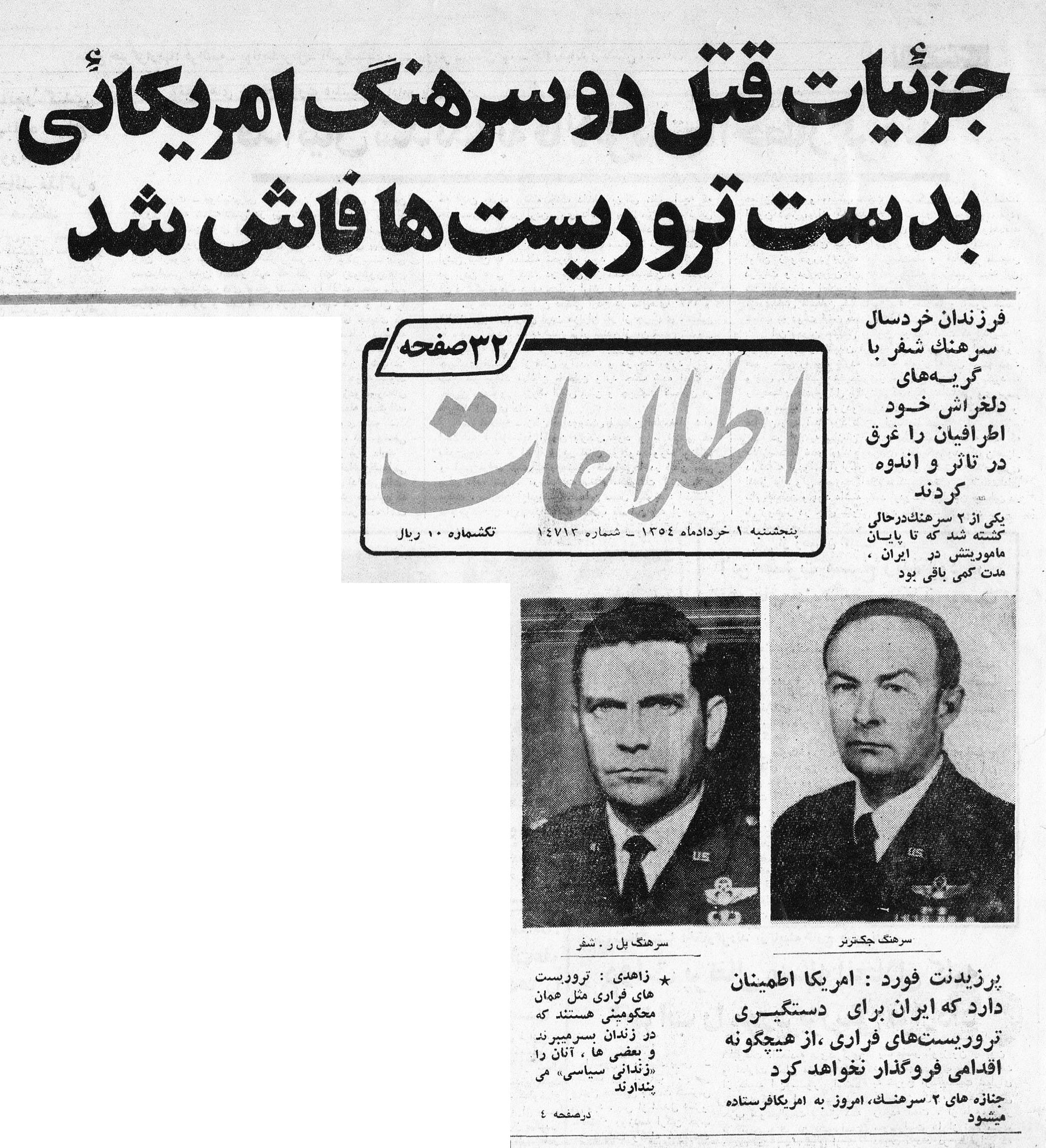
Ettela'at newspaper covering assassination of U.S. Air Force Lieutenant Colonel Jack H. Turner and Colonel Paul R. Shaffer

Colonel Paul R. Shaffer (1930–1975) was a United States military aide to Iran who served as an air force pilot in both Korea and Vietnam. In 1975, he was assassinated along with Lieutenant Colonel Jack H. Turner. Vahid Afrakhteh, a founding member of Peykar, confessed to the killing and later was executed. Nevertheless, some sources have falsely attributed the assassination to the People's Mujahedin of Iran (MEK), a group which Vahid Afrakhteh and Peykar tried to eliminate.

== Background ==
According to the US ambassador to Iran, Richard Helms, the American presence in Iran during the 1970s was too large, estimated at 10,000–40,000 people. American personnel and arms had relocated to Iran due to the arms embargo against Turkey and withdrawal of Americans from Vietnam.

In the leadup to the assassination, security for American personnel had deteriorated so much that senior officers had been assigned bodyguards. Two weeks prior, two Iranian government officials had been assassinated in Tehran and nine political prisoners had been killed in Evin prison.

== Assassination ==
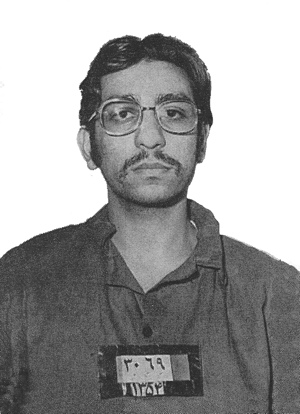
Vahid Afrakhteh's mugshot.

On 21 May 1975, terrorists stopped the car carrying Colonel Shaffer and Lieutenant Colonel John H Turner. One vehicle blocked the car from the front while another vehicle rammed it from behind. They ordered the Iranian driver to lie down, and then shot and killed the Americans at point-blank range. The shooting happened when the two officers were on their way to work at an Iranian military base in south Tehran. Hours after the attack, American officials received an anonymous call, which said the assassinations were retaliation for "Government atrocities against political prisoners". The Iranian government identified the terrorists as "young leftists" (according to another source it said "Marxist guerrillas").

Individuals belonging to Peykar were attributed responsibility by the Iranian authorities. Vahid Afrakhteh was accused and charged by an Iranian army tribunal, and was sentenced to death by firing squad. Afrakhteh (one of the founders of Peykar) confessed that he had led the cell that gunned down Col. Paul Shaffer and Lt. Col. Jack Turner, also saying that his immediate superiors at the time had close links with the Marxist Habash group.

According to some sources, the People's Mujahedin of Iran (MEK) was responsible for the assassination. According to Col Wes Martin (U.S. army), there often is no distinguishment between acts committed by the MEK and the Marxist PMOI [Peykar], and despite the Shah's police arresting "two people for the killings of Shaffer and Turner and stated they were part of the "Islamic Marxist group", and a member of the Marxist PMOI [Peykar] would later claim to have killed Hawkins, the blame remains on the PMOI [MEK]."

According to The Bulletin, a newspaper of Bend, Oregon, "a group identifying itself as the Revolutionary Republican Movement of the Armed Forces of Iran" also claimed responsibility.

== Aftermath ==
In response to the assassinations, the United States Air Force Office of Special Investigations (AFOSI) set up surveillance detection and antiterrorism efforts to protect American defense personnel in Iran. In 1976, this protective mission was expanded to include civilians, after three American civilian contractors for Rockwell International were assassinated.

In 2005 a memorial was built by the War on Terror Foundation to honor Col. Shaffer.

== See also ==
- Lewis Lee Hawkins
- List of people assassinated by the People's Mujahedin of Iran
