= Lewis Lee Hawkins =

American military personnel (1930–1973)

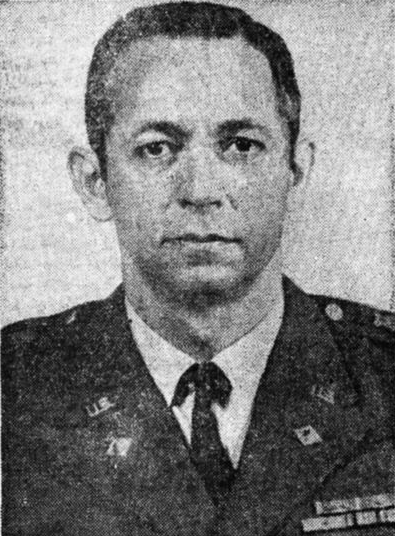
- Born: 1930; Chicago, United States
- Died: 1973 (aged 42–43); Tehran, Iran
- Military career
- Rank: Lieutenant Colonel

Lt. Colonel Lewis Lee Hawkins (August 8, 1930 – June 2, 1973) was a United States military aide to Iran. He was killed by Vahid Afrakhteh, one of the founders of Peykar Afrakhteh was later caught and admitted to the killing. While some sources attribute the assassination to the People's Mojahedin of Iran, the greater organization's internal ideological complexities at the time (later formalized by Vahid's founding of the Marxist Mojahedin split-off organization) make attribution to the MEK, as a whole, uncertain and disputed.

== Early life ==
Hawkins was born to Herman and Mary Hawkins in Chicago on August 8, 1930. He graduated from Plymouth High School and enlisted in South Carolina Presbyterian College on a basketball scholarship. He graduated in 1952 and joined the United States Army as a second Lieutenant. Hawkins later obtained a master's degree in Business Administration from Syracuse University.

In the 1970s Hawkins became the Director of the Department of Finance at U.S. Army Finance School at Indiana. In 1972 Hawkins was assigned to be the deputy chief in the U.S. Military Assistance Advisory Group to the Imperial Iranian Armed Forces in Iran. He lived with his wife and children in the Abbasabad district.

== Assassination ==
On June 2, 1973, Hawkins was walking to the street corner to be picked up by his driver when two terrorists riding on a motorcycle shot him at point blank range, killing him instantly. Hawkins' wife rushed outside to see his body in a pool of blood. He was 42 years old at the time. The terrorists immediately fled the scene and were not captured.

According to an American military advisor, Hawkins was killed "by an Iranian terrorist". The assassination seemed to have been motivated by political considerations. Although there were two witnesses, the assassins were wearing motorcycle helmets and could not be identified. Some GOI officials believed the group responsible to be left-wing and Iraq-supported, while others suspected The Mojahedin-e-Khalq.

On May 11, 1976, The Washington Post reported that in January of that year, "nine terrorists convicted of murdering the three American colonels… were executed." The leader of the group, Vahid Afrakhteh, one of the founders of Peykar (a Marxist group that broke off from Mujahedin-e-Khalq), stated that he personally killed Col. Lewis Lee Hawkins in Tehran in 1973.

== See also ==
- Paul R. Shaffer
