= Saeed Mohsen =

Co-founder of the People's Mojahedin Organization of Iran

- سعید محسن
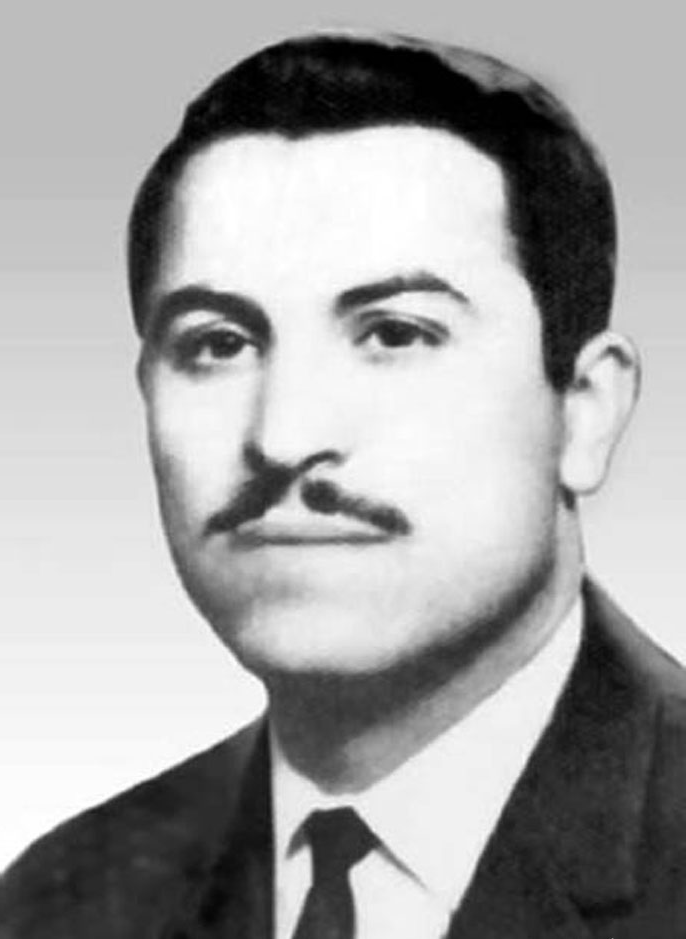

Leader of the People's Mojahedin of Iran
- In office 5 September 1965 – 25 May 1972 Serving with Mohammad Hanifnejad and Ali Asghar Badiazadegan
- Preceded by: Organization established
- Succeeded by: Massoud Rajavi (1979)

Personal details
- Born: 1939 Zanjan, Iran
- Died: 25 May 1972 (aged 32–33) Tehran, Iran
- Resting place: Behesht-e Zahra
- Education: University of Tehran

Saeed Mohsen (Persian: سعید محسن; 1939 – 25 May 1972) was one of the founders of the People's Mojahedin Organization of Iran (PMOI), along with Mohammad Hanifnejad and Ali Asghar Badiezadegan, on 5 September 1965. Saeed Mohsen was arrested by the SAVAK in 1971 and executed on 25 May 1972, along with other founders and two members of the organization's central committee.

== Early life ==
Saeed Mohsen was born into a middle-class family in Zanjan. He completed his primary and secondary education in the same city and then came to Tehran to continue his studies and graduated in the field of facilities engineering at the Faculty of Engineering of the University of Tehran. Saeed's student days coincided with the political upheavals of 1960–1963. Before founding the organization, Saeed had been imprisoned twice for his political activities, the second time was when he was a member of the Student Committee of the Freedom Movement of Iran and was arrested on the night of 21 January 1963. After his release from prison, he served as a military conscript in Jahrom. In his interrogations about the living conditions of the people of southern Iran, he writes:

In Bandar Abbas, I encountered passers-by, each of whom had a leg the size of a cloth ball. When I asked, it turned out that this worm is special for water and enters the body through drinking water and then comes out of the leg. I will never forget the feeling of pity that I felt for these people. Accepting that these people were living in such a state of discomfort was a pressure I couldn't bear.

After completing his military service, Saeed Mohsen went to Tehran and worked at an ARJ factory and then the Sepanta factory, and at the same time continued his political activities.

In 1962, after the Buin Zahra earthquake in Qazvin, Saeed Mohsen and Ali Asghar Badiezadegan went to this area at the head of student groups to help this area and spent several months providing relief.

Saeed's younger brother, Mehdi Mohsen, was also killed under SAVAK torture in 1973.

== Founding the PMOI ==
Saeed Mohsen, along with Mohammad Hanifnejad and Ali Asghar Badiezadegan, founded the People's Mojahedin Organization of Iran on September 5, 1965. After the suppression of the demonstrations of June 5, 1963, they summed up the past political struggles and came to the conclusion that political and reformist struggles have always been suppressed by the dictatorship and do not achieve the desired result. From 1965 to 1971, they worked ideologically, organizationally, and strategically for six years.

== Arrest and execution ==
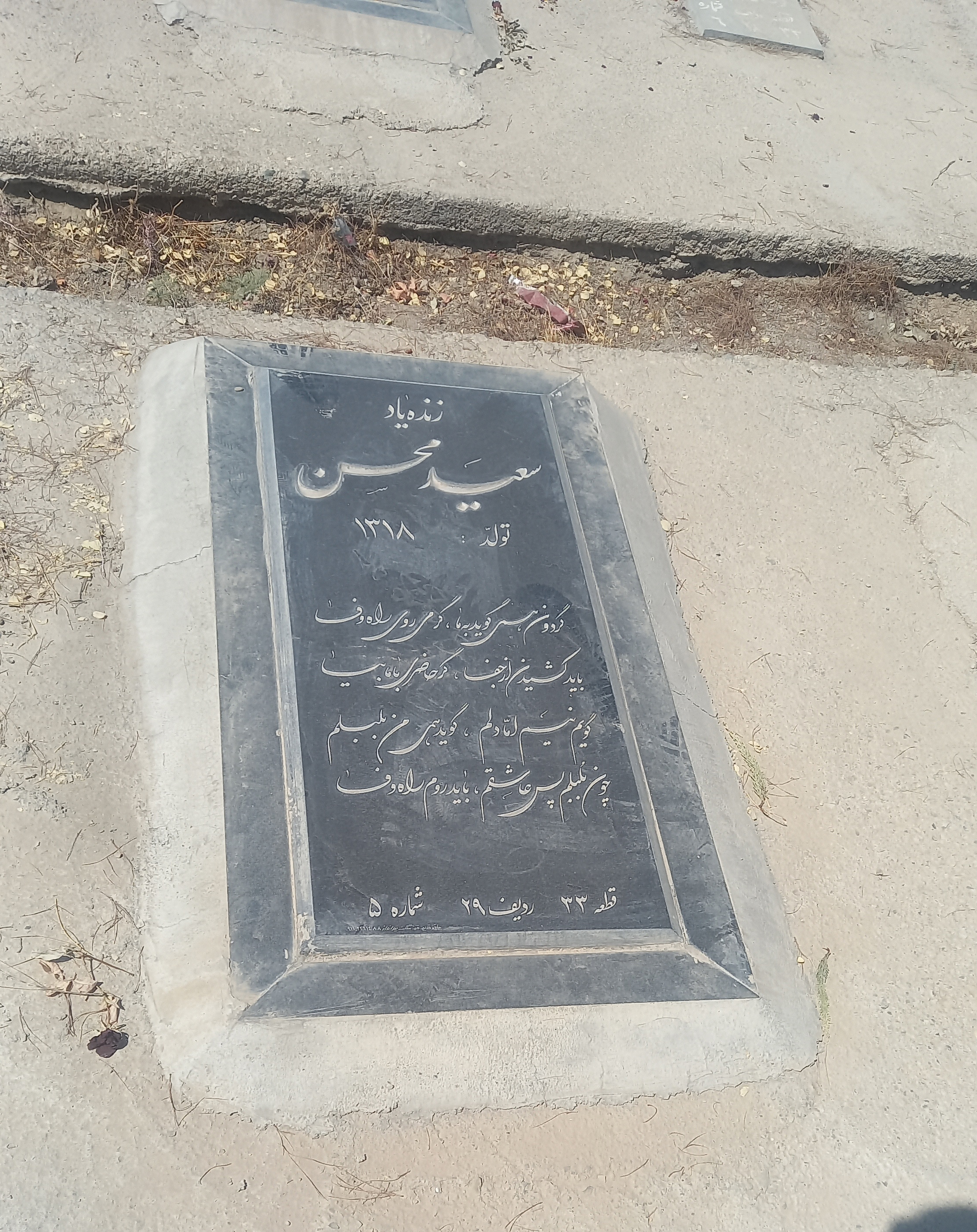
Grave of Mohsen at Behesht-e Zahra

Saeed Mohsen was arrested and imprisoned during the September 1971 strike by the SAVAK, shortly before the 2,500-year celebrations of the monarchy.

In part of his defense at the military court, Saeed Mohsen said: "The Iranian nation is not obliged to follow a reactionary ideology. These laws are basically the result of the dictatorship and are not acceptable to the nation. Evolution requires that whatever is rotten is discarded. In an environment where people's rights are respected, people are crazy to take up arms. Weapons are a means of defending human dignity for us."

=== Execution ===
After enduring months of torture, Saeed Mohsen was executed on May 25, 1972, along with other founders, Mohammad Hanifnejad and Ali Asghar Badiezadegan, and two members of the organization's headquarters, Abdolrasoul Meshkinfam and Mahmoud Askarizadeh.

His burial place is in Plot 33 of Behesht-e Zahra in Tehran.
