= Tshamala Kabanga =

Congolese former professional footballer (born 1984)

Tshamala Kabanga Lê Minh Tshamala
Personal information
- Full name: Tshamala Kabanga
- Date of birth: 10 October 1984 (age 42)
- Place of birth: Kinshasa, Zaire
- Height: 1.89 m (6 ft 2 in)
- Position: Forward

Senior career*
| Years | Team | Apps | (Gls) |
| 2001–2003 | TP Mazembe | 29 | (9) |
| 2003–2004 | Orlando Pirates | 6 | (1) |
| 2004–2005 | Long An | 19 | (10) |
| 2005–2006 | Quảng Nam | 26 | (17) |
| 2006–2012 | Long An | 168 | (97) |
- * Club domestic league appearances and goals

Tshamala Kabanga (born 10 October 1984) is a Congolese former professional footballer who was last played for V.League 1 club Long An.

== Career ==
=== Orlando Pirates ===
While playing for TP Mazembe in the 2003 Vodacom Challenge, Kabanga was spotted by the South African football club, the Orlando Pirates, and signed for them shortly after. He scored his only goal for the Buccaneers over four starts and two substitute appearances in a 1–1 draw with Wits University and was traded to Vietnamese side Long An F.C. following his only season there.

=== Vietnam ===
After a spell with Long An Kabanga was loaned to Quang Nam where he stayed for one season before returning to his previous Vietnamese team. He scored a hat trick for Long An in the last round of 2008 V. League 1, where the team placed second. Kabanga was praised for his unselfishness forming close links with all his teammates. He recorded a brace in the 2006 Vietnamese Super Cup final and an 87th-minute goal in a 1–4 defeat to Seongnam in the 2007 AFC Champions League while playing as a midfielder. He scored four goals in six rounds in the 2010 V-League.

During the 2010 season, Kabanga temporarily changed his name to Le Minh Tshamala to be naturalized as a citizen in Vietnam, and become eligible to be registered for a domestic slot in the National Cup.

Kabanga was known for his distinct Peacock Dance goal celebration. There was a noted rivalry between him and teammate Antonio Carlos that lasted several years. His six-year stint at Long An ended in 2011 following a post-match argument with new coach Simon McMenemy.

== Personal life ==
Kabanga can speak English, French, as well as Vietnamese after being taught by a teammate. He was noted by his teammates for performing excellent Karaoke.

Kabanga now works at the S and A Academy in Vietnam.

He and his wife live in Long An presently.
