= Majid Sharif-Vaghefi =

Iranian political activist (1949–1975)

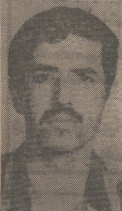
- A photo of Sharif-Vaghefi in the Ettela'at Newspaper, 1976
- Born: 1949
- Died: May 1975 (aged 25–26)
- Cause of death: Murder
- Body discovered: 31 July 1975 Mesgarabad, Imperial State of Iran
- Education: Aryamehr University of Technology
- Organization: People's Mujahedin of Iran
- Spouse: Leila Zomorrodian

Majid Sharif-Vaghefi (Persian: مجید شریف واقفی; 1949–1975) was an Iranian dissident political figure and leading member of the People's Mujahedin of Iran (MEK) who was assassinated in an internal purge staged by the MEK Marxist faction. One of the three members of the MEK's central committee from 1972 to 1975, he was considered the leader of the group's Islamist faction that refused to accept Marxism.

== Early life and background ==
He came from a "highly devout middle-class family" and was raised in Isfahan and Tehran. He studied electrical engineering at Aryamehr University of Technology, and became a member of the MEK while he was studying on a scholarship in Abadan's technical college.

== Activities ==
In 1963, Sharif Vaghefi marched in the Khordad 15 event in Qom, led by Seyyed Ruhollah Khomeini in support of Khomeini. Despite the conditions at the time, Sharif Vaghefi would post photos and proclamations of Seyyed Ruhollah Khomeini in the alleys and markets.After entering university, he founded the Islamic Association of that university with his friends. Then, he joined the People's Mojahedin Organization to fight against the Pahlavi monarchy and rose through the ranks to become one of the leaders of the organization. After a while, some of the leaders of this group decided to change the organization's ideology from Islam to Marxism. Sharif Vaghefi strongly opposed this decision, which led to his expulsion from the Central Council.

The differences between Taqi Shahram and Bahram Aram with Sharif Vaghefi escalated to the point that in an article titled "Let's Raise the Flag of Ideological Struggle Higher," which was published in the organization's magazine in December 1974, Sharif Vaghefi was severely criticized by the organization.

On the 4th of Khordad 1974, Sharif Vaghefi and his wife Leila Zomordian planted a bomb at the General Electric Company. They had placed the bomb in a flowerpot and placed it on the company owner's car. When the factory janitor, Abdullah Soleimani, saw the flowerpot and tried to remove it, the bomb exploded and he lost his life.The General Electric janitor was killed in the bombing. Sharif Vaghefi and Leila Zomordian were both wanted by the Joint Committee for Anti-Sabotage and Combating Terrorism of SAVAK. It is said that Zomordian, in a chase by SAVAK, eventually despaired of escape and committed suicide by taking cyanide pills.

== Murder ==
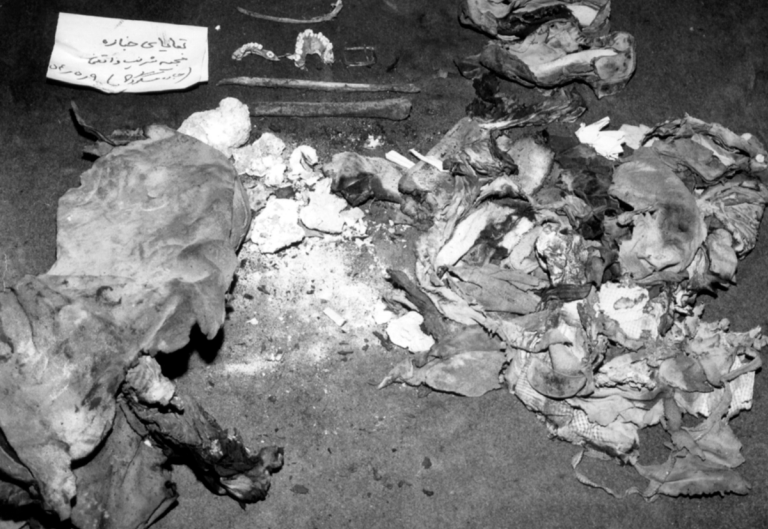
Remnants of Sharif-Vaghefi's corpse

By the spring of 1975, when the majority of the MEK turned to Marxism, he was given an ultimatum by the other two members of the central committee who became Marxists, Taghi Shahram and Bahram Aram, to accept the new ideology. In order to "raise his political consciousness", he was given the chance to choose between a move to the MEK cell in Mashhad, leaving the country, or to work in factories for a while.

Sharif-Vaghefi pretended that he wanted to go to Mashhad, but instead moved some of the MEK arms and equipment to a new hiding place and tried to organize the part of the MEK that resisted the ideological change. His wife, part of the Marxist faction, provided Shahram and Aram with information on his activities. Mainly on Shahram's initiative, Sharif-Vaghefi was killed and his body was immolated and dumped outside the city. SAVAK managed to find the remnants of the body.

== Legacy ==
Following the Iranian Revolution, the university he attended was renamed to "Sharif University of Technology" in his honour.

Party political offices
Preceded by Kazem Zolanvar	Member of the Central Committee of the People’s Mojahedin Organization of Iran; 1972–1975; Served alongside: Reza Rezaei (1972–73), Taghi Shahram (1973–75) and Bahram Aram (1972–75)	Vacant
