= Peykar (1979 newspaper) =

Iranian communist newspaper

- Workers of the world, unite!

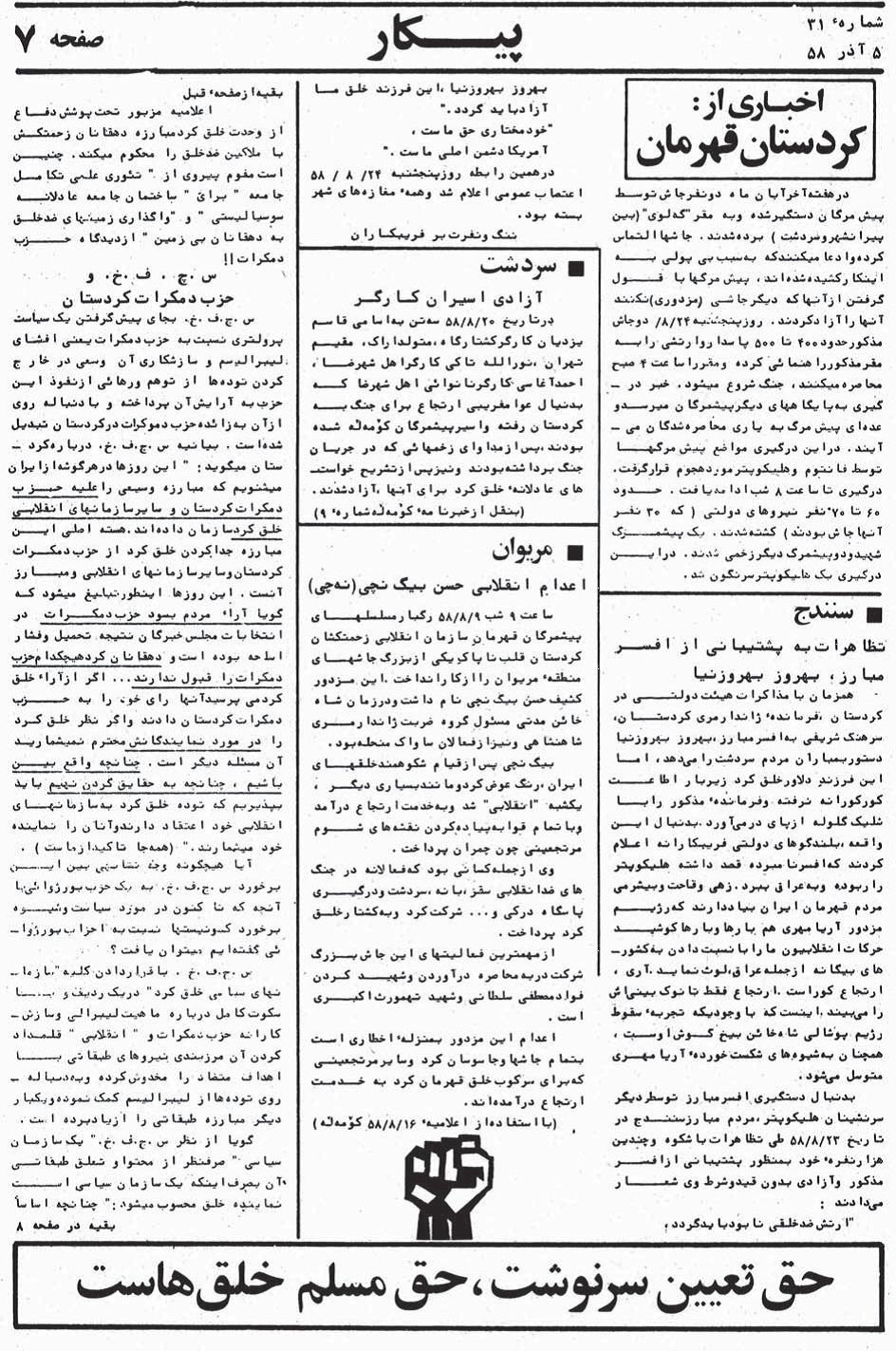
- Type: Weekly
- Format: Tabloid
- Editor: Torab Haghshenas
- Launched: 28 April 1979
- Ceased publication: 16 November 1981
- Political alignment: Organization of Struggle for the Emancipation of the Working Class
- Language: Persian
- Country: Iran
- OCLC number: 942783613
- Free online archives: peykarandeesh.org

Peykar (Persian: پیکار, lit. 'Struggle') was a weekly newspaper in Iran that was published as the official organ of the communist organization Organization of Struggle for the Emancipation of the Working Class.

127 issues of Peykar were published between April 1979 and October 1981. Torab Haghshenas served as the editor of the newspaper.

Peykar was among left-wing publications that the Tudeh Party of Iran was critical of.
