= Organization of Working-class Freedom Fighters =

Organization of Working-Class Freedom Fighters
- Leader: Afḵam Aḥmadī
- Founded: 1979
- Dissolved: 1980s
- Merged into: Communist Party of Iran
- Ideology: Marxism–Leninism
- Political position: Far-left

Organization of Working-Class Freedom Fighters (Persian: سازمان رزمندگان آزادی طبقه کارگر, romanized: Sāzmān-e razmandagān-e āzādī-e ṭabaqa-ye kārgar) or simply Razmandegan, was a communist party in Iran that opposed both the Soviet line and the guerrilla doctrine.
