= 2005–06 Kuwaiti Premier League =

- Season: 2005–06
- Champions: Kuwait Kaifan
- Matches: 182
- Goals: 518 (2.85 per match)

Statistics of Kuwaiti Premier League for the 2005–06 season. The bottom 6 teams of that season were relegated as the commencing season was the inaugurating season of the Kuwaiti second division.

== Overview ==
It was contested by 14 teams, and Al Kuwait Kaifan won the championship.

== League standings ==
Pos	Team	Pld	W	D	L	GF	GA	GD	Pts
1	Al Kuwait Kaifan	26	21	3	2	63	10	+53	66
2	Al Qadisiya Kuwait	26	19	5	2	67	14	+53	62
3	Al Salmiya Club	26	18	4	4	78	24	+54	58
4	Al Arabi Kuwait	26	17	5	4	58	15	+43	56
5	Kazma Sporting Club	26	14	8	4	47	19	+28	50
6	Tadamon	26	10	9	7	34	30	+4	39
7	Sahel	26	8	7	11	23	36	−13	31
8	Fahaheel	26	8	7	11	20	41	−21	31
9	Al Yarmouk	26	7	8	11	32	42	−10	29
10	Al Naser Sporting Club	26	6	6	14	21	36	−15	24
11	Al Jahra	26	6	6	14	21	43	−22	24
12	Khaitan	26	3	4	19	14	68	−54	13
13	Al-Shabab	26	3	3	20	25	69	−44	12
14	Sulaibikhat	26	3	3	20	15	71	−56	12

Source: rsssf.com
