= Ali Asghar Badiazadegan =

Ali-Asghar Badiezadegan
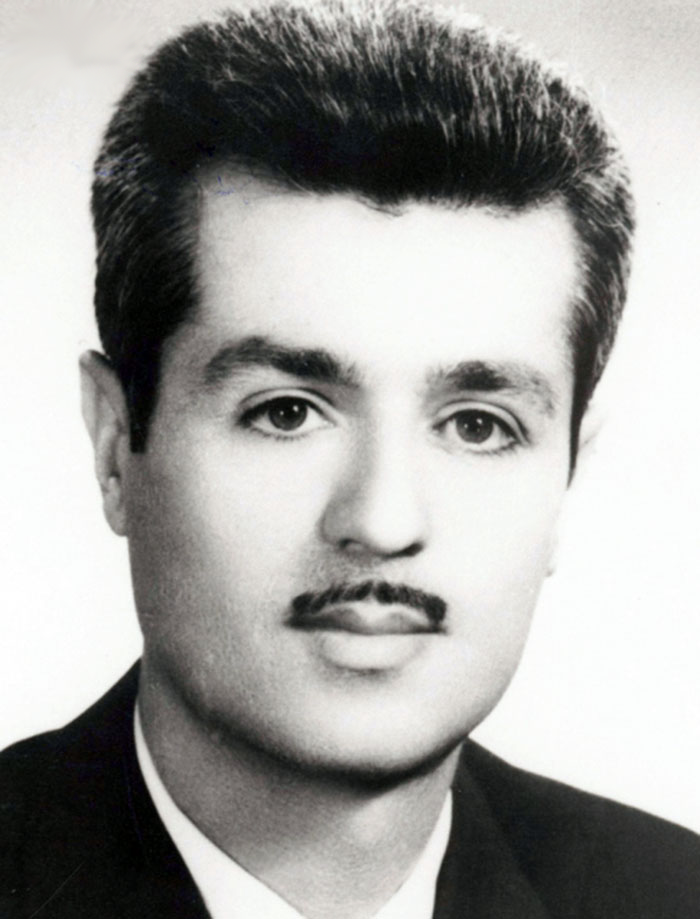
- Born: Ali-Asghar Badiezadegan; 3 August 1940; Isfahan, Imperial State of Iran
- Died: 25 May 1972 (aged 31); Tehran, Imperial State of Iran
- Education: University of Tehran
- Occupation: Engineer
- Organization: People's Mujahedin of Iran
- Known for: Co-founder of the People's Mujahedin of Iran
- Parent: Mahmoud Badiezadegan
- Relatives: Shaheen Badiezadegan (sister)

Ali Asghar Badizadegan (3 August 1940 – 25 May 1972) was one of the founders of the People's Mojahedin Organization of Iran. Together with Saeed Mohsen and Mohammed Hanifnejad, he founded the People's Mojahedin Organization of Iran in 1965. Ali Asghar Badiazadegan was arrested by SAVAK in 1971 and executed on the fourth of 25 May 1972 along with other founders and two members of the central committee of the Mojahedin Organization of Iran.

== Life ==
Badiezadegan completed his primary and high school education in Isfahan, Karaj and Tehran. He had been studying in the field of Chemical Engineering at the Technical Faculty of Tehran University. During his student days, influenced by the lectures of Syed Mahmoud Taleghani and engineer Mehdi Bazargan, he participated in the activities of the National Front and at the same time he was familiar with Mohammad Hanifnejad and Saeed Mohsen. Eventually, Asghar Badiezadegan went to the conscription system and there, with military training and skills, and after completing the 9-month trial period, he first worked in the army's weapons factory.

== Founding of the People's Mojahedin Organization of Iran ==
Asghar Badiezadegan, along with Mohammad Hanifnejad and Saeed Mohsen, in summarizing the reasons for the failure of the past campaigns, concluded that these campaigns did not have a professional leadership and organization. Believing that without giving up his job, money, education and life, he cannot fight against oppression, together with Mohammad Hanifnejad and Saeed Mohsen, he founded the People's Mojahedin Khalq Organization by summarizing the struggles of the Iranian people, and they worked on ideological, organizational and strategy formulation.

== Execution ==
Ali Asghar Badiazadegan on the 25 May 1972 with the founders of Mojahedin, Mohammad Hanifnejad and Saeed Mohsen, and two members of the organization's central staff, Abdul Rasul Meshkinfam and Mahmoud Asgarizadeh, in Chitgar Square. They were shot.

His burial place is in section 33 of Behesht Zahra in Tehran. After the revolution, in a short period of time, the name of Tehran University Technical College was changed to Badiezadegan Technical College.
