= Organization of Struggle for the Emancipation of the Working Class =

Political faction in Iran (1975–1983)

Organization of Struggle for the Emancipation of the Working Class سازمان پیکار در راه آزادی طبقه کارگر
- Abbreviation: Peykâr
- Leader: Hossein Rouhani; Taghi Sahram; Baram Aram; Rahman Vahid Afrakhteh
- Founded: 1975
- Dissolved: 1983
- Split from: MKO
- Newspaper: Peykâr
- Membership: Maximum 3,000 equipped with light weapons
- Ideology: Communism; Marxism–Leninism; Stalinism; Maoism; Hoxhaism
- Political position: Far-left
- National affiliation: Septuple Coalition

Party flag

The Organization of Struggle for the Emancipation of the Working Class, (Note: Persian: سازمان پیکار در راه آزادی طبقه کارگر, romanized: Sâzmân-e peykâr dar râh-e âzâdî-ye tabaqe-ye kârgar, IPA: [sɒːzˈmɒːne pʰejˈkʰɒːɹ d̪ær‿ˈrɒːhe ɒːzɒːˈd̪iːje t̪ʰæbæˈʁeje kʰɒːɹˈɡʲæɹ]) or simply Peykar, (Note: Persian: پيکار, romanized: Peykâr, IPA: [pʰejˈkʰɒːɹ]) also known by the earlier name Marxist Mojahedin, was a splinter group from the People's Mojahedin of Iran (PMOI/MEK).

Members associated with it declared that they no longer self-identify as Muslims but rather believe in Marxism–Leninism. They subsequently started an intragroup conflict with other MEK members who refused to join it (on the grounds that they believed in Islam) and tried to purge the group to make it Marxist. Peykar originated in 1972 after the MEK leadership was jailed by the shah, but it was officially founded in 1975, and by the early 1980s Peykar was no longer considered active. Peykar was considered "the most extreme" among all Iranian communist groups active at the time. Peykar was subsequently suppressed and through imprisonment and executions, its existence came to an end by the early 1980s.

== History ==
=== Schism ===
In the mid-1970s, an internal coup was launched in the People's Mojahedin Organization of Iran with some members trying to change the organization from Muslim into a Marxist-Leninist group. This led to two rival Mojahedins, with the Marxist faction later forming Peykar.

According to Dr. Allan Hassaniyan, Peykar was founded in 1975, and after the Iran revolution it moved activities to Kurdistan. The members of the faction were neither raw recruits nor ideological simpletons, conversely many of the intellectuals surviving from the early MEK days were among them. Two members of the MEK's original Ideological Team were among senior Peykar members.

At the time the schism happened suddenly in 1975, the MEK was operating with a clandestine cell system in three branches wholly separated from each other, each headed by a Central Cadre (CC) member. The ideological shift in the organization was completely top-to-bottom and started by Taghi Shahram, one of the three CC members. He then persuaded another CC member Bahram Aram to leave Islam, and through him started converting the branch subordinated to him. The other CC member, Majid Sharif-Vaghefi, refused to join and led the opposing faction whose members remained Muslims. This led to infighting within the organization and Sharif-Vaghefi and his second-in-command were murdered by the Marxist faction. The purge by the Marxists continued, however its scope is unknown. The group claimed that they had purged almost half of the members who refused to "correct" themselves. The rival Muslim faction, maintained that only as much as 20% of the members sided with the Marxist faction. Nonetheless, Peykar failed to dominate the MEK and the Muslim faction survived, partly in the provinces, in Tehran bazaar and mainly among jailed members.

From 1975 to 1979, Peykar was known as "the Marxist Mojahedin", before assuming the title Bakhsh-e Marksisti-Leninisti-ye Sazeman-e Mojahedin-e Khalq-e Iran (lit. 'The Marxist-Leninist Branch of the People's Mujahedin Organization of Iran') in 1978. Nevertheless, they modified the emblem from the beginning by dropping Islamic elements. They called each other by the title Rafiq (comrade) instead of Baradar (brother), stopped performing prayers and dropped 'In the Name of God' from their publications.

During this period, the Marxist Mojahdin were notably active, particularly in Tehran. In July 1975, they attempted to assassinate a senior American diplomat. In a separate incident, they engaged in a violent street confrontation with the police. In August 1975, they bombed the main police station and also assassinated three American employees of Rockwell International. Their 'Military Communique No. 24' declared that the three individuals had been 'executed' in retaliation for recent death sentences and to protest the significant expenditure on military hardware.

After the Iranian 1979 Revolution, the group adopted the name "Sazman-i Paykar dar Rah-i Azad-i Tabaqeh-i Kargar (The Fighting Organisation of the Road to Liberating the Working Class)", also known as Peykar (or Paykar). (Note: "Immediately after the revolution, when the Marxist Mojahedin renamed itself Peykar")

Author Yadullah Shahibzadeh says that the Mojahedin's Marxist-Leninist faction generated several other Marxist-Leninist groups, and the most prominent of them became known as Peykar. According to Ervand Abrahamian, the schism between the opposing Marxist and Muslim factions of the People's Mojahedin Organization of Iran was complicated and lasted more than a year. The Islamic members of the Mojahedin refused to give up the Mojahedin name, and the Marxist Mojahedin later adopted the name Peykar.

In his 1989 book "Radical Islam: The Iranian Mojahedin", Abrahamian says that the Marxist Mojahedin had originally taken the name of the "People's Mojahedin Organization of Iran". Then in 1978, it assumed the name "Bakhsh-e Marksisti-Leninisti-ye Sazeman-e Mojahedin-e Khalq-e Iran (The Marxist-Leninist Branch of the People's Mojahedin Organization of Iran)", and then during the 1979 Iran revolution it merged with Maoist groups, forming the group "Sazeman-e Paykar dar Rah-e Azadi-ye Tabaqeh-ye Kargar (The Combat Organization on the Road for the Emancipation of the Working Class)", which became known as "Paykar". Peykar had Maoist orientations and was joined by some other groups with such an ideology, while Peykar members who were less favorable to China formed another organization known as the Worker's Way. In his 1982 book "Iran Between Two Revolutions", Abrahamian described Peykar as synonymous with the "Marxist Mojahedin".

According to Iranian scholar Parvin Paidar, The split between the two groups strengthened the Islamic identity of the original People's Mojahedin Organization of Iran. The Muslim faction accused the Marxist faction of orchestrating a "coup d'état" in the MEK. Iranian opposition were surprised by the rise of this faction within the MEK.

During the reorganization of the Marxist Mojahedin into Peykar in 1979, some members refused to accept the changes and formed splinter groups including the United Campaign for Fulfillment of the Working Class Aspirations (etteḥād-e mobāraza dar rāh-e ārmān-e ṭabaqa-ye kārgar), simply known as 'Arman', the Group for the Combat for Emancipation of the Working Class (gorūh-e nabard barā-ye āzādī-e ṭabaqa-ye kārgar), simply known as 'Nabard', and the Organization of Revolutionary Workers of Iran, also known as 'The Worker's Way' (rāh-e kārgar). The group Arman was later merged into the Organization of Working-class Freedom Fighters (simply known as Razmandegan).

Abolhassan Banisadr, who was exiled in France at the time, slammed Peykar and labeled them as "fascists" in a tract named monafeqin az didgah-e ma (lit. 'our view of the hypocrites'). The Freedom Movement of Iran also denounced the faction and paid tribute to Muslim members who were murdered by the Marxists. Left-wing organizations did not endorse the purge done by the Marxist faction. The Organization of Iranian People's Fedai Guerrillas (which was on friendly terms with the MEK) was very concerned about the issue and Hamid Ashraf had strongly reacted against the assassination of Sharif-Vaghefi. Conservative clerics issued a fatwa that prevented Muslims from associating the Marxists, declaring that they are najis.

According to the information compiled by Ervand Abrahamian, the total number of members who lost their lives was 30, of whom 16 were killed in action while 10 others were executed. One member committed suicide, one was tortured to death and the other two were missing. The members of the rival Muslim faction who lost their lives were 73, more than twice.

=== Foundation ===
Peykar was co-founded by three leading members of MEK Marxist faction, Hossein Ahmadi-Rouhani, Torab Haghshenas and Alireza Sepasi-Ashtiani, the three who had ousted Taghi Shahram from the ranks of the faction. By 1978, the MEK Marxist faction was in a weak position, both organizationally and theoretically. In the summer of 1978, a council of representatives met in order to reorganize the group and came to the conclusion that they should abandon armed struggle and concentrate on agitating the working class against the establishment.

On 7 December 1978, the triumvirate officially declared existence as the Organization of Struggle for the Emancipation of the Working Class (named after the League of Struggle for the Emancipation of the Working Class which Vladimir Lenin had founded in 1895). However, some refused to accept the changes and two other groups were established, namely the Group for the Combat for Emancipation of the Working Class and the United Campaign for Fulfillment of Working-class Aspirations, which were small in comparison to Peykar. Another group whose membership included elements from the MEK's Marxist faction was the Organization of Revolutionary Workers of Iran – The Worker's Way.

As the Iranian Revolution was taking place, Peykar's role in the developments was marginal, because it was relatively small and unprepared for the events to come. Its activities during the final days to the revolution was limited to some political agitation.

Some small Maoist groups were also merged into Peykar. An example of groups joining Peykar was Comrades of Heydar Amu Oqli (Goruh-e Yaran-e Heydar Amu Oqli).

Hossein Rouhani was another prominent Peykar member. He ran for Majles candidate in Tehran, and caused a major scandal in 1980 by divulging for the first time secret PMoI negotiations with Ayatollah Khomeini. Ruhani also made Peykar "the first left-wing organization to personally criticize Khomeini", when he called Khomeini a "mediaeval obscurantist" and his regime "reactionary" and "fascistic." Later Ruhani was arrested and imprisoned. In May 1982 he appeared on television as one of the first of numerous opponents of the regime to recant their opposition in what is widely thought to have been the work of prison torture. Ruhani denounced his membership in Peykar, praised "the Imam" Khomeini and proclaimed that he felt freer in prison than "in the outside world."

=== Early revolutionary years (1979–1980) ===
In the immediate aftermath of the revolution, Peykar was able to reorganize freely.

In May 1979, Peykar organized a "unity conference" in Tehran with an aim to create a united front. Among participants in the conference were the Organization of Working-class Freedom Fighters, two other Peykar offshoots who had refused to join it, Komala and the newly-reorganized Communist League of Iran. As a result of Peykar's policy to place unity under its leadership, no agreement was achieved though it managed to co-opt two small cells without offering full-membership to them. In the same month, the group started publishing an eponymous official weekly newspaper, Peykar, which was printed until October 1981.

Peykar supported Kurdish rebellion and had a tactical alliance with Komala. It considered the group's Kurdish rival, the Democratic Party of Iranian Kurdistan, a "bourgeois party" and accused it of collusion with the Iranian government. It had a mixed view of the Organization of Iranian People's Fedai Guerrillas (OIPFG). While accepting the OIPFG as the largest Iranian Marxist group, Peykar criticized it for being made up of the petite bourgeoisie rather than the proletariat. During the OIPFG schism, Peykar sided with the Minority faction and became hostile to the Majority faction, treating the latter like the Tudeh Party.

When Iran–Iraq War started in September 1980, Peykar launched a propaganda campaign promoting anti-war views. It was the only Marxist group that did not interpret the Iraqi invasion of Iran as imperialism's preemptive action against Iranian revolution. Instead, they said it was not a just war and encouraged the working class both in Iran and Iraq to unite and fight against anti-revolutionary forces in power. This position resulted in execution of some Peykar members by the Iranian government.

=== Conflict and dissolution (1981–1982) ===
Internal factionalism, as well as suppression by the Iranian government, led to dissolution of Peykar.

Due to preaching secular opposition to the ruling clergy, Peykar became a principal target of suppression by the Iranian government. In February 1981, along with the MEK, Peykar was involved in a rebellion in Tabriz that threatened Tabriz Air Base. As a security measure two brigades from the 28th Division were deployed to the region amidst the war with Iraq. In June 1981, when MEK unrest happened, the government became determined to suppress Peykar despite the organization not supporting the MEK. The group adopted more radical slogans against the Iranian government, openly calling for its overthrow. In return, the Iranian government executed Mohsen Fazel, one of the group's leader experienced in guerilla warfare. Fazel had been arrested in January 1981 on his way to Syria to make contact to Palestinians.

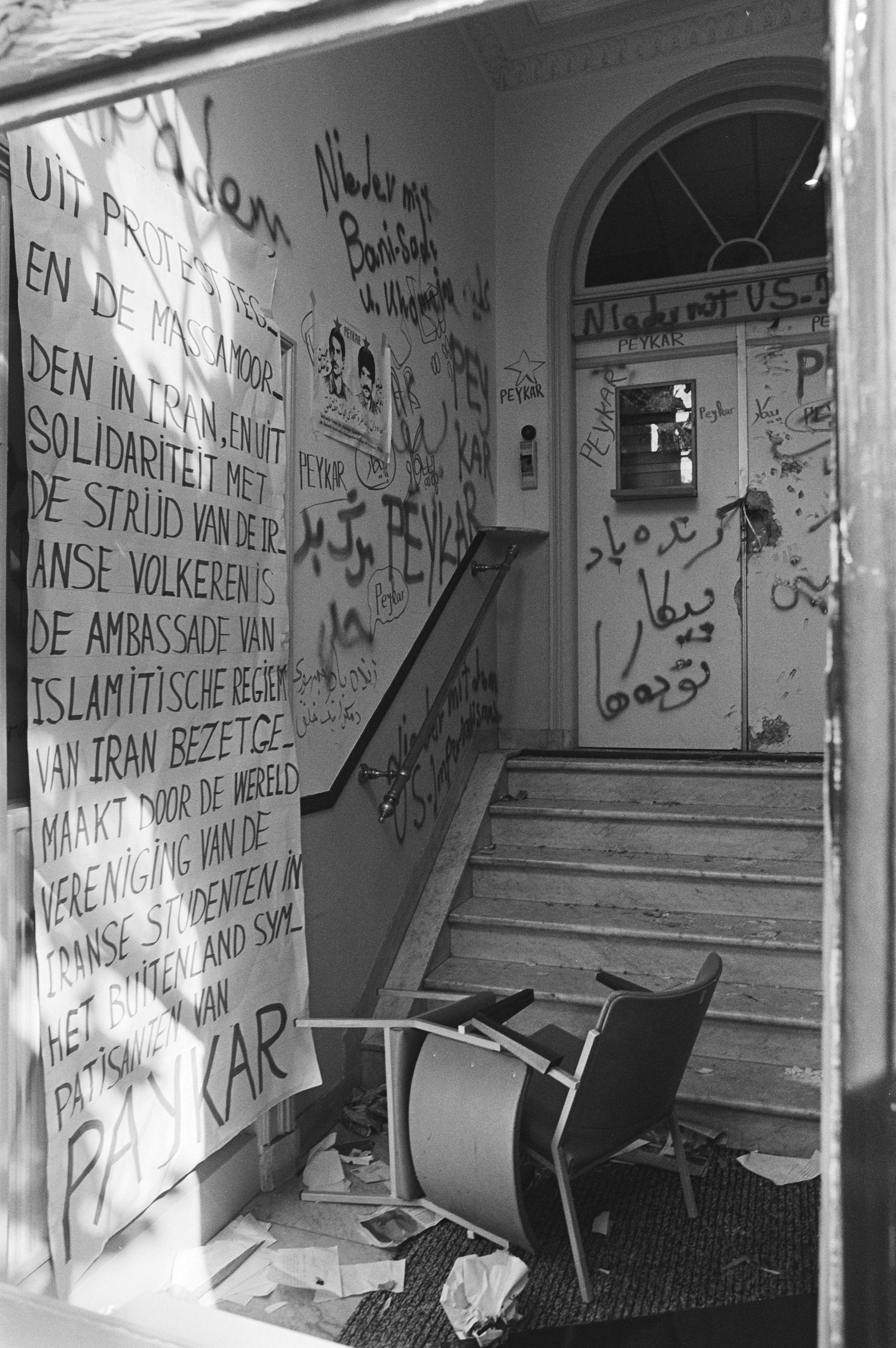
Iranian diplomatic mission in The Hague, attacked by Peykar on 25 August 1981

Later that month, Peykar was split into three factions as a result of internal conflicts. One faction was in favor of adopting the new policy of supporting Islamic liberals who were removed from power (led by Ahmadi-Rouhani and Sepasi-Ashtiani); the other which was unrepresented in the central committed and made a bid for leadership, called itself The Revolutionary Line and accused the leadership of deviation to right-wing; the third faction which had one representative in the central committee called for the previous policies to continue and reshuffle the leadership.

From August 1981 onwards, Peykar was hit hard by the security forces and two leaders of the group were arrested in February 1982. Sepasi-Ashtiani died in custody while Ahmadi-Rouhani collaborated with the authorities. The latter not only appeared on television to confess and denounce Peykar, but became a born-again Muslim and collaborated with the government to uproot Peykar. Ahmadi-Rouhani was nonetheless executed and became a "nonperson", while Peykar refused to list him as a martyr.

On 14 April 1982, Peykar assailants attacked Iranian consulate in Geneva, damaged the property and took 6 people inside as hostages. According to MIPT Terrorism Knowledge Base, the hostage-taking by 18 perpetrators lasted for two hours, and hostages were released unharmed.

The crackdown of Peykar led many members of the group flee the country, while those who remained inside Iran were imprisoned or executed. The remnants of the organization, the majority of whom belonged to the new policy faction, joined members of some other minor communist groups to found the Communist Party of Iran in 1983. The few members remaining in exile did not succeed in reviving the organization, and it was soon considered defunct by mid-1980s.

A total number of 255 Peykar members were executed between June 1981 and June 1985, according to Mojahed. Some members of Peykar who were imprisoned, did not survive 1988 executions of Iranian political prisoners. Of the incomplete list of 615 victims compiled by the Majority Fedaian, 3 are recorded as affiliated with Peykar.

== Organization and leadership ==
Actual membership of Peykar was small while the group did not attempt to recruit new members. It had thousands of supporters, but the number of members who played a role in leading it was probably between 30 and 50. Pierre Razoux estimates that the group had 3,000 members at peak, mainly scattered through Tehran, Azerbaijan and the North.

The group had a five-member central committee, of which only two members –Hossein Ahmadi-Rouhani and Alireza Sepasi-Ashtiani– are known and the names of the other three was never made public. Other leading members of the group included Torab Haghsehnas, Pouran Bazargan, Mohsen Fazel, Qassem Abedini, Ebrahim Nazari and Morteza Aladpoush.

Peykar had an affiliated student wing named Trailblazing Students Supporting Peykar (Sazman-e Daneshamouzan-e Pishtaz Havadar-e Peykar), as well as a teacher's wing named Organization of Trailblazing Teachers Supporting Peykar (Sazman-e Mo'alleman-e Pishtaz Havadar-e Peykar).

== Ideology ==
Peykar espoused Marxism–Leninism and from 1979 to 1982, it was considered "the main standard-bearer of Maoism and Stalinism in Iran". It has been also described as having Trotskyist views.

The organization was extremely hostile to policies of both the Soviet Union and the People's Republic of China. While it maintained that the United States was the principal enemy of the revolution in Iran, Peykar considered the Soviets an imminent threat to Iran. They called the Soviet Union a "socialist-imperialist power" and regarded the Tudeh Party a Soviet "fifth column". The only communist state that the group favored was the People's Socialist Republic of Albania, which it took as a role model.

According to Maziar Behrooz, the group was "staunchly Stalinist–Maoist from its inception" and their understanding of Marxism was "at best, infantile, superficial and shallow" in comparison to the Tudeh Party of Iran and the Organization of Iranian People's Fedai Guerrillas. Mao Zedong's essay On Contradiction served as a major influence on the faction.

The faction first publicized its positions in late 1975 with a publication named Manifesto of Ideological Positions of Organization of Iranian People's Mojahedin (Marxist-Leninist). It stated that "in honest efforts to resolve the most basic problems of the revolution, we arrived at the truth of Marxism-Leninism", adding that "In spite of all the innovations that our Organization introduced to religious thought and in spite of all the efforts it made to revive and revitalize its [i.e., Islam's] historical content and upgrade its archaic principles and methods to the latest scientific contributions [to the study] of society".

The manifesto further explains the reason behind leaving Islam as:

Religion has no answer to the fundamental question 'why should one struggle against oppression?' In fact, an individual can be highly devout and extremely observant of religious precepts, yet remain passive... If you examine carefully the Koran and the other Islamic texts, you will see that they are somewhat ambiguous on this issue and recommend resistance only in dire situations; i.e. when one has actually been physically expelled from one's town or territory... Thus Islam leaves unanswered the question 'why should I struggle?' Marxism, on the other hand, has no difficulties answering it; for struggle is the essence of dialectical materialism.

== Membership ==
Group members and their future political affiliations (if any) are:

- Jalil Ahmadian (Peykar)
- Morteza Aladpoush (Peykar)
- Ebrahim Avakh (Worker's Way)
- Bahman Bazargani (—)
- Masoud Esmaeilkhani (—)
- Ebrahim Jowhari (Worker's Way)
- Fathollah Khamenei (—)
- Mehdi Khosrowshahi (Worker's Way)
- Mohammad Khansari (Peykar)
- Hossein Qazi (Worker's Way)
- Hassan Rahi (—)
- Mohammad Rahmani (Peykar)
- Mojtaba Taleqani (—)
- Vahid Afrakhteh (—; executed in 1976)
- Kazem Shafiiha (—)
- Mohammad Shafiiha (Peykar)
- Taghi Shahram (Peykar)
- Alireza Tashayod (Worker's Way)
- Alireza Zomorrodian (Peykar)
- Hossein Ahmadi-Rouhani (Peykar)
- Torab Haqshenas (Peykar)
- Bahram Aram (—; killed in action)
- Puran Bazargan (Peykar)
- Alireza Sepasi-Ashtiani (Peykar)
- Leila Zomorrodian (—; killed in action in 1976)
- Sedigheh Rezaei (—; killed in action)
- Hasan Aladpoush (—; killed in action in 1976)
- Mahbubeh Motahedin (—; killed in action in 1976)

== See also ==
- People's Mojahedin Organization of Iran
