= Mohammad Hanifnejad =

Co-founder of the People's Mojahedin Organization of Iran

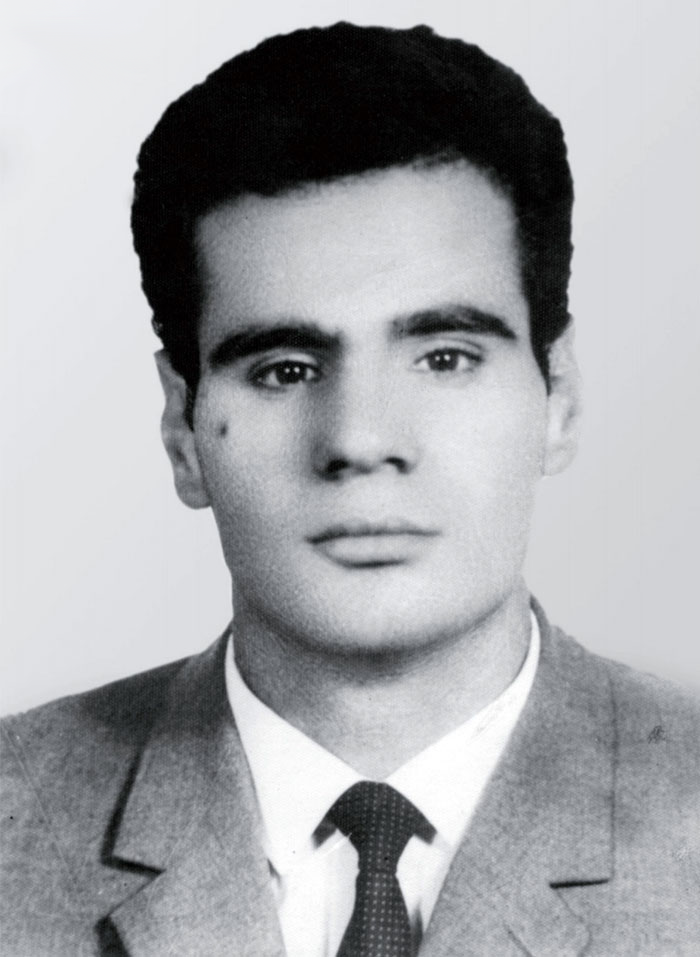
- Born: 3 August 1938; Tabriz, Imperial State of Iran
- Died: 25 May 1972 (aged 33); Tehran, Imperial State of Iran
- Education: Tehran University

Mohammed Hanifnejad (3 August 1938–25 May 1972) was one of the founders of the People's Mojahedin Organization of Iran. Together with Saeed Mohsen and Ali Asghar Badiazadegan, he founded the People's Mojahedin Organization in 1965. Mohammad Hanifnejad was arrested by SAVAK in 1971 and executed on the 25 May 1972 along with other founders and two members of the central committee of the Mojahedin Organization of Iran.

Hanifnejad emphasized on being revolutionary and being democratic as the guiding theory of action, and clarified: From a social and economic point of view, the boundary between right and wrong is not the boundary between god and godlessness, it is the real boundary between the exploiter and the exploited. In this regard, he believed that the existence of a revolutionary organization is the guarantor of the implementation of this idea.

== Life and activities ==
Mohammad Hanifnejad was born in Tabriz in 1317 and completed his primary and secondary education at Hammam Primary School, Taleghani High School and Mansour High School and Ferdowsi High School in this city. He was a student of agricultural engineering. He graduated in 1342 and finished his military service with the rank of officer in Tehran and Isfahan Artillery Center.

== Political activity ==
During his studies, Hanifnejad was an active student and the head of the Islamic Students' Association, and he was active in the student movements of 1339 to 1342 in the National Front of Iran and the Freedom Movement. In February 1341, after the attack of the Shah's commandos on the university, he was arrested and imprisoned, and was imprisoned for 7 months in Qazal Qala Prison and Qasr Prison. He did not stop his activities inside the prison, and he strengthened the atmosphere of resistance in the prison by organizing lectures, debates and criticism sessions.

== The establishment of the Mojahedin organization ==
Mohammad Hanifnejad, together with Saeed Mohsen and Ali Asghar Badiazadegan, founded the Mojahedin Khalq organization in the middle of September 1344. At the time of the foundation, it was simply called "Organization" and until his execution, this organization was not called "People's Mojahedin Khalq Organization".

In 1341, Hanifnejad met [Saeed Mohsen] in Qazal Qala prison. They believed that the Shah's regime changed the phase of the struggle with the demonstrations of 15 Khordad 42. According to Mohammad Hanifnejad, "the killing of people who were empty-handed showed that I can no longer continue fighting with the old methods." In addition to the struggle, they studied Islam and Western schools and the struggles of the people of Iran and the rest of the world, and reached armed struggle and founded the organization.

Hanifnejad and the early members of the People's Mojahedin Khalq Organization had examined new answers to issues from the heart of Islam and compiling and presenting it. They were trying to find a way to fight with the new era from the heart of Shia history. Together with Saeed Mohsen and Ali Asghar Badiazadegan, he learned the first lessons of Islam that is compatible with the new era and responsive to new issues from Engineer Bazargan, Ayatollah Taleghani and Dr. Sahabi.

== Execution ==
In September 1971, he was arrested by Iran's SAVAK organization and sentenced to death for the crime of acting against the country's security. On May 25, 1972, he was shot with his friends. His burial place is in section 33 of Behesht Zahra in Tehran.
