= Bahram Aram =

Member of the People's Mojahedin of Iran (1949–1976)

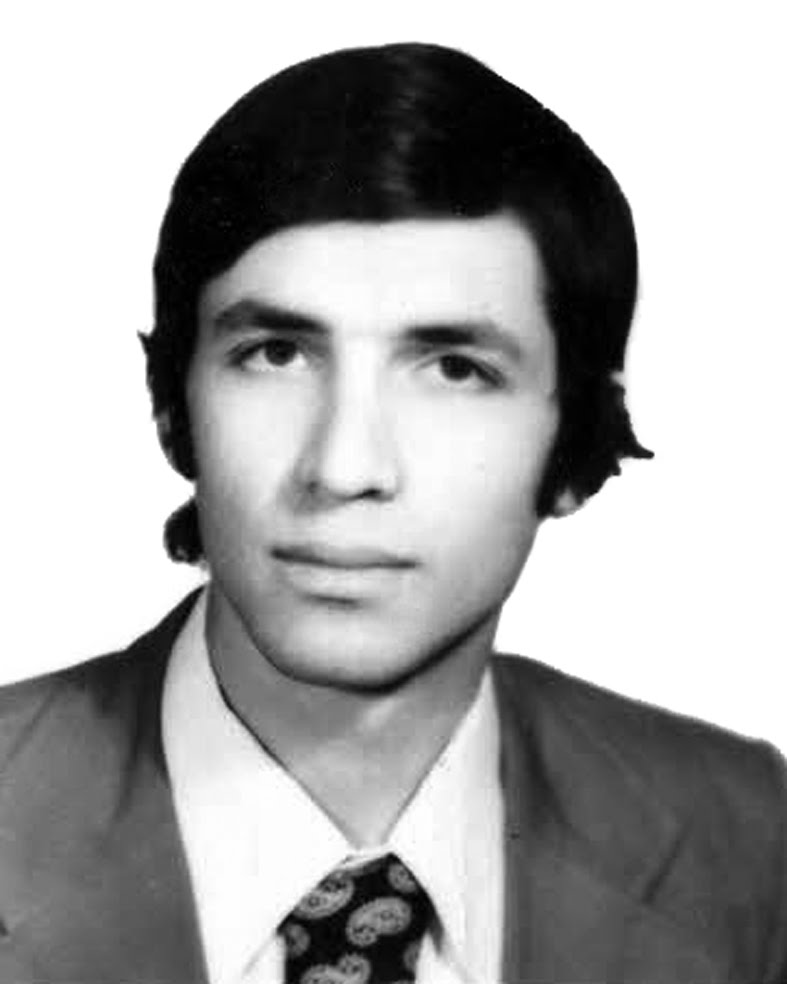
- Born: 1949; Tehran, Imperial State of Iran
- Died: 19 November 1976 (aged 27); Tehran, Imperial State of Iran
- Spouse: Simin Salehi
- Relatives: Ahmad Aram (uncle)

Bahram Aram (Persian: بهرام آرام; 1949 – 19 October 1976) was a high-ranking member of the People's Mojahedin Organization of Iran, who detonated a hand grenade in a chase with SAVAK agents, resulting in his death in 1976.

== Political activity ==
In 1969, while he was a student at Aryamehr University, he joined the People's Mojahedin Organization of Iran through Ahmad Rezaei. He quickly demonstrated his abilities in operational and military matters and advanced within the organization’s ranks. In September 1971, on the eve of the 2,500-year celebration of the Persian Empire, a widespread raid by SAVAK’s special units led to the arrest of almost all the members and the central leadership of the organization. After this crackdown, he joined the central leadership of the organization alongside Ahmad Rezaei and Reza Rezaei, and became the leader of the organization’s military branch. Bahram served as the head of the military branch for five years, during which he planned all of the organization’s military operations. Following the ideological shift of the organization, he also became a Marxist; in fact, Bahram acted as the operational agent of Taghi Shahram in the transformation of the organization.

His wife, Simin Salehi, also a member of the organization, was arrested on 18 August 1974. Their daughter was born in prison and Simin named her Sepideh Sahar meaning 'dawn's light' in Persian.

After a few armed confrontations with SAVAK agents during 1975 – 1976, finally, on the afternoon of 19 November 1976 he was identified by SAVAK and during the ensuing chase, he became trapped in a courtyard enclosed by several buildings. He took cover behind some bricks and, after an hour of shooting and exhausting his ammunition, detonated a grenade, killing himself. Bahram’s suicide dealt a severe blow to the Organization and to Taghi Shahram personally.
