= Government of Amir-Abbas Hoveyda (1974–1977) =

Iranian cabinet

- Cabinet of the Imperial State of Iran

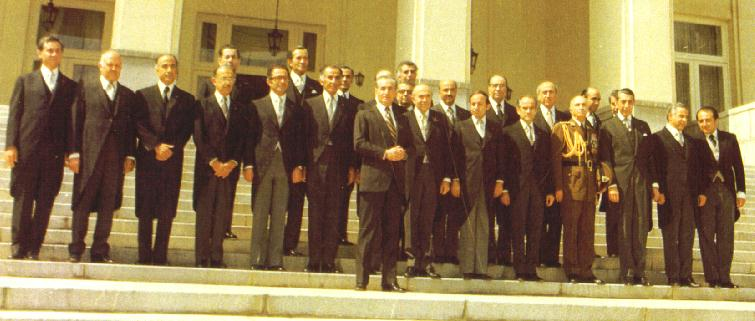
- Date formed: 29 May 1974
- Date dissolved: 7 August 1977

People and organisations
- Head of state: Mohammad Reza Pahlavi
- Head of government: Amir-Abbas Hoveyda
- Deputy head of government: Mahmoud Ghavam Sadri
- No. of ministers: 18

History
- Legislature term: 24th Iranian Majles
- Successor: Amouzegar

The sixth Hoveyda government was a cabinet of Iran led by Prime Minister Amir-Abbas Hoveyda that was formed on 27 May 1974 and presented to Shah Mohammad Reza Pahlavi on 29 May. Hoveyda reshuffled in the cabinet on 8 November 1976, replacing all of his ministers. The government was dissolved in August 1977 and replaced by that of new Prime Minister Jamshid Amouzegar.

== Background ==
On 27 May 1974, Hoveyda appointed Hushang Ansary as minister of finance, replacing Jamshid Amouzegar. Amouzegar was then made minister of interior.

The same day, Hoveyda established the Ministry of Industry and Mines, Ministry of Commerce and Ministry of Social Welfare. He also reorganized the existing Ministry of Finance and Economic Affairs, Ministry of Energy and Ministry of Information and Tourism.

Other appointments included Karim Motamedi as minister of post and telecommunications, Gholamreza Kianpour as minister of information, Fereydoun Mahdavi as minister of commerce, Abdol Hossein-Samii as minister of science and higher education, Reza Azimi as minister of war, Iraj Vahidi as minister of energy, Farrokh Najmabadi as minister of industry and Mines and incumbent Abbas Ali Khalatbari as minister of foreign affairs.

== Cabinet ==
Cabinet members were as follows:

| Portfolio | Minister | Took office | Left office | Party |
|---|---|---|---|---|
| Prime Minister | Amir-Abbas Hoveyda | 29 May 1974 | 7 August 1977 | Rastakhiz Party |
| Minister of Agriculture | Mansour Rouhani | 29 May 1974 | 7 August 1977 | Rastakhiz Party |
| Minister of Commerce | Fereydoun Mahdavi | 29 May 1974 | 9 November 1976 | Rastakhiz Party |
| Minister of Commerce | Manouchehr Taslimi | 9 November 1976 | 7 August 1977 | Rastakhiz Party |
| Minister of Culture and Art | Mehrdad Pahlbod | 29 May 1974 | 7 August 1977 | Rastakhiz Party |
| Minister of Culture and Higher Education | Manouchehr Shahgholi | 29 May 1974 | 22 September 1975 | Rastakhiz Party |
| Minister of Culture and Higher Education | Abdol-Hossein Samii | 22 September 1975 | 9 November 1976 | Rastakhiz Party |
| Minister of Culture and Higher Education | Qasem Motamedi | 9 November 1976 | 7 August 1977 | Rastakhiz Party |
| Minister of Education | Farrokhroo Parsa | 29 May 1974 | 22 September 1975 | Rastakhiz Party |
| Minister of Education | Ahmad Houshang Sharifi | 22 September 1975 | 9 November 1976 | Rastakhiz Party |
| Minister of Education | Manouchehr Ganji | 9 November 1976 | 7 August 1977 | Rastakhiz Party |
| Minister of Economic Affairs and Finance | Hushang Ansary | 29 May 1974 | 7 August 1977 | Rastakhiz Party |
| Minister of Energy | Iraj Vahidi | 29 May 1974 | 3 June 1976 | Rastakhiz Party |
| Minister of Energy | Parviz Hekmat | 3 June 1976 | 7 August 1977 | Rastakhiz Party |
| Minister of Foreign Affairs | Abbas Ali Khalatbari | 29 May 1974 | 7 August 1977 | Nonpartisan |
| Minister of Health | Anoushirvan Pouyan | 29 May 1974 | 3 October 1975 | Rastakhiz Party |
| Minister of Health | Shojaaddin Shiekholeslamzadeh | 3 October 1975 | 7 August 1977 | Rastakhiz Party |
| Minister of Housing | Homayoun Jabri Ansari | 29 May 1974 | 7 August 1977 | Rastakhiz Party |
| Minister of War | Reza Azimi | 29 May 1974 | 7 August 1977 | Military |
| Minister of Interior | Jamshid Amouzegar | 29 May 1974 | 7 August 1977 | Rastakhiz Party |
| Minister of Justice | Sadegh Ahmadi | 29 May 1974 | 3 November 1976 | Rastakhiz Party |
| Minister of Justice | Gholamreza Kianpour | 3 November 1976 | 7 August 1977 | Rastakhiz Party |
| Minister of Post, Telegraph and Telephone | Karim Motamedi | 29 May 1974 | 7 August 1977 | Rastakhiz Party |
| Minister of Roads and Transportation | Hassan Shalchian | 29 May 1974 | 22 September 1975 | Nonpartisan |
| Minister of Roads and Transportation | Javad Shahrestani | 22 September 1975 | 7 August 1977 | Rastakhiz Party |
| Minister of Labor and Social Affairs | Amir-Ghasem Moeinian | 29 May 1974 | 1 November 1976 | Rastakhiz Party |
| Minister of Labor and Social Affairs | Manouchehr Azmoun | 1 November 1976 | 7 August 1977 | Rastakhiz Party |
| Minister of Information and Tourism | Gholamreza Kianpour | 29 May 1974 | 3 November 1976 | Rastakhiz Party |
| Minister of Information and Tourism | Karim Pasha Bahadori | 3 November 1976 | 7 August 1977 | Rastakhiz Party |
| Minister of Industries and Mines | Farrokh Najmabadi | 29 May 1974 | 3 November 1976 | Rastakhiz Party |
| Minister of Industries and Mines | Mohammad-Reza Amin | 3 November 1976 | 7 August 1977 | Rastakhiz Party |
| Minister of Cooperation and Rural Affairs | Reza Zedkiani | 29 May 1974 | 7 August 1977 | Rastakhiz Party |
Ministers without portfolio
| Women Affairs | Mahnaz Afkhami | 31 December 1975 | 7 August 1977 | Rastakhiz Party |
| Plan and Budget | Abdol Majid Majidi | 29 May 1974 | 7 August 1977 | Rastakhiz Party |
| Endowment | Mohammad-Hossein Ahmadi | 29 May 1974 | 7 August 1977 | Rastakhiz Party |
Vice Prime Ministers
| Deputy Prime Minister | Mahmoud Ghavam Sadri | 29 May 1974 | 7 August 1977 | Rastakhiz Party |
| Deputy Prime Minister | Hossein Tedin | 29 May 1974 | 7 August 1977 | Rastakhiz Party |
| Deputy Prime Minister | Mahmoud Behrouz | 29 May 1974 | 7 August 1977 | Military |
| Director of Civil Defense Affairs | Mohsen Mobasser | 29 May 1974 | 7 August 1977 | Military |
| Financial Affairs | Ahmad Kashifi | 29 May 1974 | 7 August 1977 | Rastakhiz Party |
| Director of SAVAK | Nematollah Nassiri | 29 May 1974 | 7 August 1977 | Military |
| President of the Atomic Energy Organization | Akbar Etemad | 29 May 1974 | 7 August 1977 | Rastakhiz Party |
| President of the Department of Environment | Eskandar Firouz | 29 May 1974 | 7 August 1977 | Rastakhiz Party |
| Secretary-General of the ARAO | Amin Alimard | 29 May 1974 | 7 August 1977 | Rastakhiz Party |

Government of Iran
| Preceded by Fifth Cabinet of Hoveyda | Sixth Government of Hoveyda; 29 May 1974 - 7 August 1977 | Succeeded by Cabinet of Amouzegar |
