= Cabinet of Jafar Sharif-Emami (1978) =

Government of Iran

Second Cabinet of Jafar Sharif-Emami
- Cabinet of the Imperial State of Iran

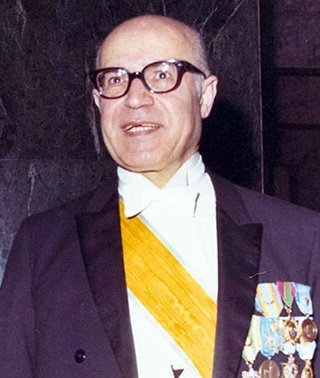
- Sharif-Emami in 1978
- Date formed: 25 September 1978
- Date dissolved: 5 November 1978

People and organisations
- Head of state: Mohammad Reza Pahlavi
- Head of government: Jafar Sharif-Emami
- Member party: Rastakhiz Party (until 1 November 1978)

History
- Legislature term: 24th Iranian Majles
- Predecessor: Amouzegar
- Successor: Azhari

The second government of Jafar Sharif Emami (Persian: دولت سوم جعفر شریف‌امامی) was one of the last governments of the Pahlavi dynasty, which operated from September 1978 to November 1978. The head of this government was Jafar Sharif-Emami. The Sharif Emami government was impeached by the parliament on 29 November 1978, but received a vote of confidence.

== Overview ==
He decided to appoint Jafar Sharif-Emami to the post of prime minister, himself a veteran prime minister. Emami was chosen due to his family ties to the clergy, although he had a reputation of corruption during his previous premiership.

On 29 September 1978, Sharif Emami was elected Prime Minister and introduced his cabinet to the Shah on the same date and to the Islamic Consultative Assembly on 25 September 1978. The National Consultative Assembly gave his government a vote of confidence on 25 September 1978, with 177 votes out of 200.

Under the Shah's guidance, Sharif-Emami effectively began a policy of "appeasing the opposition's demands before they even made them." The government abolished the Rastakhiz Party, legalized all political parties and released political prisoners, increased freedom of expression, curtailed SAVAK's authority and dismissed 34 of its commanders, closed down casinos and nightclubs, and abolished the imperial calendar. The government also began to prosecute corrupt government and royal family members. Sharif-Emami entered into negotiations with Shariatmadari and National Front leader Karim Sanjabi to help organize future elections. Censorship was effectively terminated, and the newspapers began reporting heavily on demonstrations, often highly critically and negatively of the Shah. The Majlis (Parliament) also began issuing resolutions against the government.

Amidst the growing crisis, Sharif-Emami resigned on 5 November 1978, and was succeeded by General Gholam Reza Azhari, who formed a military government in an attempt to restore order.

== Composition ==
Cabinet members
Portfolio	Minister	Took office	Left office	Party
Prime Minister	Jafar Sharif-Emami	28 September 1978	5 November 1978	Rastakhiz
Deputy prime ministers
Deputy Prime Minister	Ali Fardad	25 September 1978	5 November 1978	Independent
Secretary General of the Administrative and Recruitment Affairs Organization	Amin Alimard	25 September 1978	5 November 1978	Rastakhiz
Head of the National Preparedness and Civilian Mobilization Organization	Qasem Khazaei	25 September 1978	5 November 1978	Independent
Head of the National Intelligence and Security Organization	Nasser Moghaddam	25 September 1978	5 November 1978	Independent
Head of the Atomic Energy Organization of Iran	Akbar Etemad	25 September 1978	5 November 1978	Independent
Head of the Environmental Protection Agency	Manouchehr Fili	25 September 1978	5 November 1978	Independent
Ministers
Minister of Education	Manouchehr Ganji	25 September 1978	1 November 1978	Rastakhiz
Minister of Information and Tourism	Mohammad Reza Ameli Tehrani	25 September 1978	6 November 1978	Rastakhiz
Minister of Finance	Mohammad Yeganeh	25 September 1978	1 November 1978	Rastakhiz
Minister of Foreign Affairs	Amir Khosrow Afshar	25 September 1978	Incumbent	Independent
Minister of Commerce	Mohammad Reza Vishkaei	25 September 1978	1 November 1978	Independent
Minister of Health	Nasrollah Moghtader Mojdehi	25 September 1978	6 October 1978	Rastakhiz
Minister of Health	Mohammad Hossein Morshed	7 October 1978	5 November 1978	Independent
Minister of Communications	Karim Motamedi	25 September 1978	5 November 1978	Rastakhiz
Minister of War	Reza Azimi	25 September 1978	5 November 1978	Independent
Minister of Justice	Mohammad Baheri	25 September 1978	5 November 1978	Rastakhiz
Minister of Justice	Hossein Najafi	5 November 1978	8 November 1978	Independent
Minister of Transportation	Hassan Shalchian	25 September 1978	5 November 1978	Independent
Minister of Industries and Mines	Mohammad-Reza Amin	25 September 1978	5 November 1978	Rastakhiz
Minister of Science	Houchang Nahavandi	25 September 1978	24 October 1978	Rastakhiz
Minister of Science	Abolfazl Ghazi	24 October 1978	5 November 1978	Rastakhiz
Minister of Culture	Mohsen Foroughi	25 September 1978	5 November 1978	Rastakhiz
Minister of Labor and Social Affairs	Kazem Vadiei	25 September 1978	5 November 1978	Rastakhiz
Minister of Agriculture and Rural Development	Amir Hossein Amir-Parviz	25 September 1978	5 November 1978	Independent politician
Minister of Interior	Abbas Gharabaghi	25 September 1978	5 November 1978	Independent
Minister of Housing and Urban Development	Parviz Avini	25 September 1978	5 November 1978	Rastakhiz
Minister of Energy	Jahanguir Mahdmina	25 September 1978	5 November 1978	Independent
Other Duties
Minister of Administrative Affairs	Manouchehr Azmoun	25 September 1978	5 November 1978	Rastakhiz
Minister of Administrative Affairs	Mostafa Paydar	5 November 1978	8 November 1978	Independent
Minister of Parliamentary Affairs	Ezatollah Yazdanpanah	25 September 1978	5 November 1978	Rastakhiz
Head of the Endowment Organization	Ali-Naghi Kani	25 September 1978	5 November 1978	Independent
Head of the Planning and Budget Organization	Hassan Ali Mehran	25 September 1978	5 November 1978	Rastakhiz
