= Military government of Gholam-Reza Azhari =

Government of Gholam Reza Azhari
- Cabinet of the Imperial State of Iran

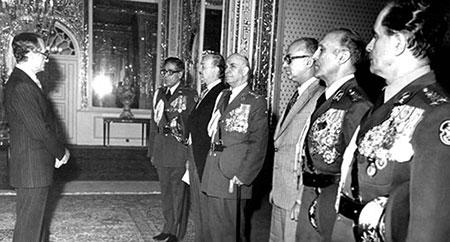
- Azhari's cabinet in 1978
- Date formed: 6 November 1978
- Date dissolved: 31 December 1978

People and organisations
- Head of state: Mohammad Reza Pahlavi
- Head of government: Gholam Reza Azhari
- No. of ministers: 18

History
- Legislature term: 24th Iranian Majles
- Predecessor: Sharif-Emami II
- Successor: Bakhtiar

On 5 November 1978, Mohammad Reza Shah Pahlavi appointed General Gholam Reza Azhari as prime minister of Iran to lead a military government amid deepening unrest across the country. The cabinet was officially formed the next day.

Despite the cabinet's stated purpose, only six of the appointed ministers were military officers, and this number was further reduced in the following weeks. As a result, the highly debated shift to a military government was, in practice, more cosmetic than substantive. Moreover, the military cabinet members had little experience in their respective areas of responsibility.

Among Azhari's first actions was the arrest and imprisonment of prominent politicians associated with the royal family, including Amir-Abbas Hoveyda, Nematollah Nassiri, Gholamreza Nikpey, and Manouchehr Azmoun. These measures, ostensibly aimed at combating corruption, were intended to appease the revolutionaries. However, they were instead interpreted as a sign of government weakness.

On the night of 20 December 1978, Azhari suffered a massive heart attack. He submitted his resignation to the Shah eleven days later and was replaced as prime minister by Shapour Bakhtiar.

== Cabinet ==
Cabinet members were as follows:

Cabinet
Portfolio	Minister	Took office	Left office	Party
Prime Minister	Gholam Reza Azhari	6 November 1978	31 December 1978	Military
Minister of Agriculture	Amir Hossein Amir-Parviz	22 November 1978	31 December 1978	Nonpartisan
Minister of Commerce	Ahmad Memarzadeh (Note: Acting from 8 to 22 November)	22 November 1978	31 December 1978	Nonpartisan
Minister of Culture and Art	Kamal Habibollahi (head of ministry)	11 November 1978	22 November 1978	Military
Minister of Culture and Art	Mohsen Foroughi	22 November 1978	31 December 1978	Nonpartisan
Minister of Culture and Higher Education	Kamal Habibollahi (head of ministry)	11 November 1978	22 November 1978	Military
Minister of Culture and Higher Education	Shamsoddin Mofidi	22 November 1978	31 December 1978	Nonpartisan
Minister of Education	Kamal Habibollahi (head of ministry)	11 November 1978	22 November 1978	Military
Minister of Education	Mohammad Reza Ameli Tehrani	22 November 1978	31 December 1978	Nonpartisan
Minister of Economic Affairs and Finance	Abbas Gharabaghi (head of ministry)	6 November 1978	22 November 1978	Military
Minister of Economic Affairs and Finance	Hassan-Ali Mehran	22 November 1978	31 December 1978	Nonpartisan
Minister of Energy	Iraj Moghadam (Note: Acting from 6 to 22 November)	22 November 1978	31 December 1978	Military
Minister of Foreign Affairs	Amir Khosrow Afshar	22 November 1978	31 December 1978	Nonpartisan
Minister of Health	Mohammad-Hassan Morshed	22 November 1978	31 December 1978	Nonpartisan
Minister of Housing	Amir Hossein Rabii (head of ministry)	6 November 1978	22 November 1978	Military
Minister of Housing	Manouchehr Behravan	22 November 1978	31 December 1978	Nonpartisan
Minister of Industries and Mines	Mohammad-Reza Amin	22 November 1978	31 December 1978	Nonpartisan
Minister of Information and Tourism	Abolhassan Sadatmand (Note: Acting from 6 to 22 November)	22 November 1978	31 December 1978	Military
Minister of Interior	Abbas Gharabaghi	22 November 1978	31 December 1978	Military
Minister of Justice	Hossein Najafi	22 November 1978	31 December 1978	Nonpartisan
Minister of Labor and Social Affairs	Gholam Ali Oveissi (head of ministry)	6 November 1978	22 November 1978	Military
Minister of Labor and Social Affairs	Bagher Katouzian	22 November 1978	31 December 1978	Military
Minister of Post, Telegraph and Telephone	Karim Motamedi	22 November 1978	31 December 1978	Nonpartisan
Minister of Roads and Transportation	Hassan Shalchian	22 November 1978	31 December 1978	Nonpartisan
Minister of War	Reza Azimi	22 November 1978	31 December 1978	Military
Ministers without portfolio
Executive Affairs	Mostafa Paydar	22 November 1978	31 December 1978	Nonpartisan
Parliamentary Affairs	Ahmad Nazemi	22 November 1978	31 December 1978	Nonpartisan
Political Affairs	Ezatollah Homayounfar	22 November 1978	31 December 1978	Nonpartisan
Endowment	Mohsen Shariatmadari	22 November 1978	31 December 1978	Nonpartisan
Plan and Budget	Morteza Salehi	22 November 1978	31 December 1978	Nonpartisan
Vice Prime Ministers
Deputy Prime Minister	Ali Fardad	22 November 1978	31 December 1978	Nonpartisan
Director of the SAVAK	Nasser Moghaddam	6 November 1978	31 December 1978	Military
President of the Atomic Energy Organization	Akbar Etemad	6 November 1978	31 December 1978	Nonpartisan
President of the Department of Environment	Manouchehr Feyli	6 November 1978	31 December 1978	Nonpartisan
President of the Physical Education Organization	Nader Jahanbani	6 November 1978	31 December 1978	Military
Secretary-General of the ARAO	Amin Alimard	6 November 1978	31 December 1978	Nonpartisan
* Acting

== See also ==
- Iranian Revolution

Government of Iran
Preceded by Second Cabinet of Sharif-Emami	Military Government of Azhari; 1978	Succeeded by Cabinet of Bakhtiar
