= Cabinet of Jamshid Amouzegar =

Iranian government (1977–78)

- Cabinet of the Imperial State of Iran

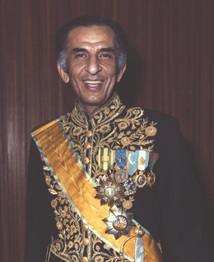
- Amouzegar in the 1970s
- Date formed: 7 August 1977
- Date dissolved: 27 August 1978

People and organisations
- Head of state: Mohammad Reza Pahlavi
- Head of government: Jamshid Amouzegar
- Member party: Rastakhiz Party

History
- Legislature term: 24th Iranian Majles
- Predecessor: Hoveyda VI
- Successor: Sharif-Emami II

The cabinet led by Jamshid Amouzegar was announced on 7 August 1977. It succeeded the last cabinet of Amir-Abbas Hoveyda who submitted his resignation on 6 August. Major goal of Amouzegar's cabinet was to implement a new liberal economic program to stop inflation. The cabinet significantly decreased the annual financial aid given to mosques and religious organizations which had very negative effects on the relations between the state and religious establishment.

The cabinet lasted only for one year until 27 August 1978 when Jamshid Amouzegar resigned from office. The reason for his resignation was the increased demonstrations of religious establishment and the fire occurred in Cinema Rex in Abadan on 19 August. The next cabinet was formed by Jafar Sharif-Emami.

== List of ministers ==
Most of the ministers who had served in the previous cabinet led by Amir-Abbas Hoveyda retained their posts. Nearly all of the cabinet members and Prime Minister were from the Rastakhiz Party.

The cabinet was consisted of the following twenty-three members:

Cabinet members
Portfolio	Minister	Took office	Left office	Party
Prime Minister	Jamshid Amouzegar	7 August 1977	27 August 1978	Rastakhiz Party
Minister of War	Reza Azimi	7 August 1977	27 August 1978	Military
Minister of Foreign Affairs	Abbas Ali Khalatbari	7 August 1977	27 August 1978	Rastakhiz Party
Minister of Agriculture and Rural Development	Ahmad Ali Ahmad	7 August 1977	27 August 1978	
Minister of Interior	Naser Isfahani	7 August 1977	27 August 1978	
Minister of Labor and Social Services	Kazem Moini	7 August 1977	27 August 1978	
Minister of Post, Telegraph and Telephone	Karim Motamedi	7 August 1977	27 August 1978	Rastakhiz Party
Minister of Economics and Finance	Houshang Ansary	7 August 1977	27 August 1978	Rastakhiz Party
Minister of Roads and Communications	Morteza Salehi	7 August 1977	27 August 1978	
Minister of Justice	Gholamreza Kianpour	7 August 1977	27 August 1978	
Minister of Health and Welfare	Shojaaddin Shiekholeslamzadeh	7 August 1977	27 August 1978	Rastakhiz Party
Minister of Education	Manouchehr Ganji	7 August 1977	27 August 1978	Rastakhiz Party
Minister of Energy	Taghi Tavakoli	7 August 1977	27 August 1978	
Minister of Housing and Urban Development	Firouz Tofigh	7 August 1977	27 August 1978	
Minister of Industries and Mines	Mohammad-Reza Amin	7 August 1977	27 August 1978	
Minister of Information and Tourism	Dariush Homayoon	7 August 1977	27 August 1978	Rastakhiz Party
Minister of Commerce	Kazem Khosrowshahi	7 August 1977	27 August 1978	
Minister of Culture and Arts	Mehrdad Pahlbod	7 August 1977	27 August 1978	
Minister of State for Economic and Development Affairs	Safi Asfia	7 August 1977	27 August 1978	
Minister of State	Mohammad Yeganeh	7 August 1977	27 August 1978	
Minister of State for Women's Affairs	Mahnaz Afkhami	7 August 1977	27 August 1978	Rastakhiz Party
Minister of State for Parliamentary Affairs	Mahmoud Kashifi	7 August 1977	27 August 1978	
Minister of State for Executive Affairs	Manouchehr Agih	7 August 1977	27 August 1978	
