= Government of Shapour Bakhtiar =

Iranian government in 1979

- Cabinet of the Imperial State of Iran

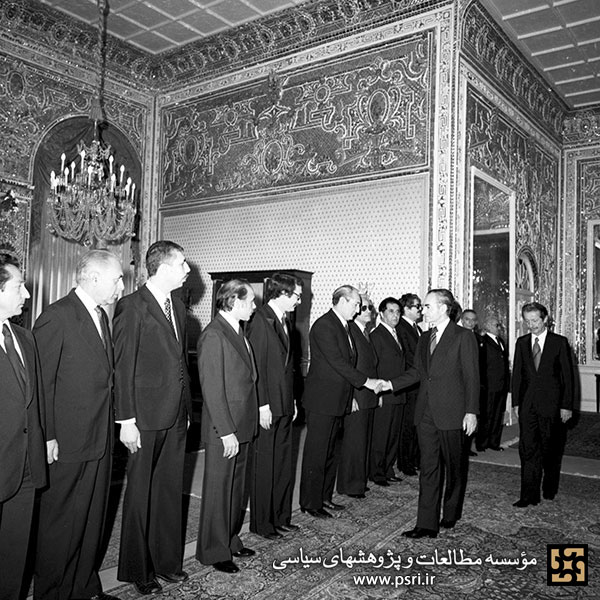
- Date formed: 5 January 1979
- Date dissolved: 11 February 1979

People and organisations
- Head of state: Mohammad Reza Pahlavi
- Head of government: Shapour Bakhtiar
- Opposition cabinet: Interim Government of Iran (4 February – 11 February 1979)

History
- Legislature term: 24th Iranian Majles
- Predecessor: Azhari
- Successor: Bazargan

The government of Shapour Bakhtiar is the last government during the Pahlavi dynasty that ended with the Islamic Revolution. The head of this 37-day government, Shapour Bakhtiar, was one of the leaders of the National Front of Iran. The National Front of Iran had announced in a statement on December 29, 1978 that if Bakhtiar accepted the post of Prime Minister of Iran, he would be expelled from the party. The day after the Prime Minister was received, his dismissal was voted on at a meeting of the Central Council, and his dismissal was decided by an overwhelming majority.

== Background of government formation ==
The Shah of Iran, Mohammad Reza Pahlavi, whose government was in decline, was looking for someone to agree to leave Iran on acceptable and confidential terms. To this end, he first met with Ahmad Bani Ahmad and Karim Sanjabi and asked them to accept the Prime Minister of the government. Citing a three-point declaration and opposing the army remaining in the royal family and the Shah refusing to step down as commander-in-chief of the Armed Forces, Sanjabi refused to accept a compromise with the Shah.

Mohammad Reza Pahlavi then met with Mozzafar Baghai and Gholam-Hossein Sadighi, other leaders of the National Front, and offered to take over the government, but each of them refused to accept the government for some reason. The Shah's offer to the Prime Minister to Siddiqui and Baqaei failed because they both made the acceptance of the Shah's offer conditional on Mohammad Reza Pahlavi remaining in Iran but not in Tehran. The two argued that the Shah's personal presence in Iran, because of his close ties to the army, maintained the unity and cohesion of the army.

Bakhtiar, a member of the Central Council of the National Front, presented the seven conditions (the Shah should leave the country and pledge to reign from now on and not the government, the choice of ministers is unique, SAVAK to be dissolved (deportation of 14 soldiers) Stubbornly, including Gholam-Ali Oveissi), political prisoners should be released, conditions for press freedom should be provided, the Pahlavi Foundation should be transferred to the government, and the imperial commission interfering in all matters should be removed) and agreed to head a civilian government. The Shah accepted all of his terms and appointed him Prime Minister.

Bakhtiar introduced his government and its plan to the parliament on December 11, 1978. On December 17, 1978, Bakhtiar and his ministers received a vote of confidence from the parliament with 149 votes in favor, 43 against and 13 abstentions. Mohammad Reza Pahlavi and his wife Farah Pahlavi left the country on 17 January 1979.

== Cabinet ==
Members of Bakhtiar's cabinet were as follows:

Cabinet
Portfolio	Minister	Took office	Left office	Party
Prime Minister	Shapour Bakhtiar	6 January 1979	11 February 1979	Iran Party
Minister of Foreign Affairs	Ahmad Mirfendereski	5 January 1979	11 February 1979	Nonpartisan
Minister of Interior	Shapour Bakhtiar	5 January 1979	11 February 1979	Iran Party
Minister of Housing	Javad Khadem Ahmadabadi	5 January 1979	11 February 1979	Nonpartisan
Minister of Agriculture	Manoucher Kazemi	5 January 1979	11 February 1979	Nonpartisan
Minister of War	Jafar Shafaghat	5 January 1979	11 February 1979	Military
Minister of Health	Manoucher Razmara	5 January 1979	11 February 1979	Nonpartisan
Minister of Education	Mohammad-Amin Riahi	5 January 1979	11 February 1979	Nonpartisan
Minister of Justice	Yahya Sadeq Vaziri	5 January 1979	27 January 1979	Nonpartisan
Minister of Justice	Shamsoddin Alemi	27 January 1979	11 February 1979	Nonpartisan
Minister of Post, Telegraph and Telephone	Lotfali Samimi	5 January 1979	11 February 1979	Nonpartisan
Minister of Information and Tourism	Cyrus Amouzgar	5 January 1979	11 February 1979	Nonpartisan
Minister of Economic Affairs and Finance	Rostam Pirasteh	5 January 1979	11 February 1979	Nonpartisan
Minister of Commerce	Abbas-Gholi Bakhtiar	5 January 1979	11 February 1979	Nonpartisan
Minister of Labor and Social Affairs	Manoucher Ariana	5 January 1979	11 February 1979	Nonpartisan
Advisory Minister
Advisory Minister	Cyrus Amouzgar	5 January 1979	11 February 1979	Nonpartisan
Vice Prime Ministers
Deputy Prime Minister	Mohammad Moshiri Yazdi	5 January 1979	10 February 1979	Nonpartisan
Deputy Prime Minister	Fathollah Motamedi	10 February 1979	11 February 1979	Nonpartisan
Director of the SAVAK	Nasser Moghaddam	5 January 1979	11 February 1979	Military
President of the Atomic Energy Organization	Akbar Etemad	5 January 1979	11 February 1979	Nonpartisan
President of the Department of Environment	Manoucher Feyli	5 January 1979	11 February 1979	Nonpartisan
President of the Physical Education Organization	Nader Jahanbani	5 January 1979	11 February 1979	Military
Secretary-General of the ARAO	Amin Alimard	5 January 1979	11 February 1979	Nonpartisan

== See also ==
- Iranian Revolution

Preceded by Cabinet of Gholam-Reza Azhari	Cabinet of Bazargan; 1979	Succeeded by Interim Cabinet of Iran
