= Kamal Habibollahi =

Final commander of the Imperial Iranian Navy (1930–2016)

Timsar Kamal Habibollahi
- کمال حبیب‌اللهی
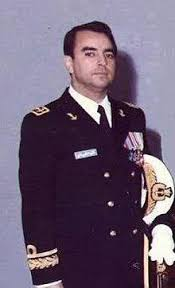
- Admiral Habibollahi in 1976

Commander of the Imperial Iranian Navy
- In office 7 January 1976 – 11 February 1979
- Monarch: Mohammad Reza Pahlavi
- Prime Minister: Amir-Abbas Hoveyda; Jamshid Amouzegar; Jafar Sharif-Emami; Gholam Reza Azhari; Shapour Bakhtiar
- Preceded by: Abbas Ramzi Attaie
- Succeeded by: Afsari-Pur

Minister of Culture and Art Acting
- In office 11 November 1978 – 22 November 1978
- Monarch: Mohammad Reza Pahlavi
- Prime Minister: Gholam Reza Azhari
- Preceded by: Mohsen Foroughi
- Succeeded by: Mohsen Foroughi

Minister of Education Acting
- In office 11 November 1978 – 22 November 1978
- Monarch: Mohammad Reza Pahlavi
- Prime Minister: Gholam Reza Azhari
- Preceded by: Manouchehr Ganji
- Succeeded by: Mohammad Reza Ameli Tehrani

Minister of Culture and Higher Education Acting
- In office 11 November 1978 – 22 November 1978
- Monarch: Mohammad Reza Pahlavi
- Prime Minister: Gholam Reza Azhari
- Preceded by: Abolfazl Qazi
- Succeeded by: Shamsoddin Mofidi

Personal details
- Born: Mir-Kamaloddin Mir-Habibollahi; 1 February 1930 Astara, Pahlavi Iran
- Died: 11 October 2016 (aged 86) Reston, Virginia, United States
- Resting place: Merrifield, United States
- Party: Azadegan Organization
- Spouse: Ladan Kianpour
- Children: 2
- Education: U.S. Naval War College; Naval Postgraduate School; Royal Naval Academy; Officers' School

Military service
- Allegiance: Pahlavi Iran
- Branch/service: Navy
- Years of service: 1949–1979
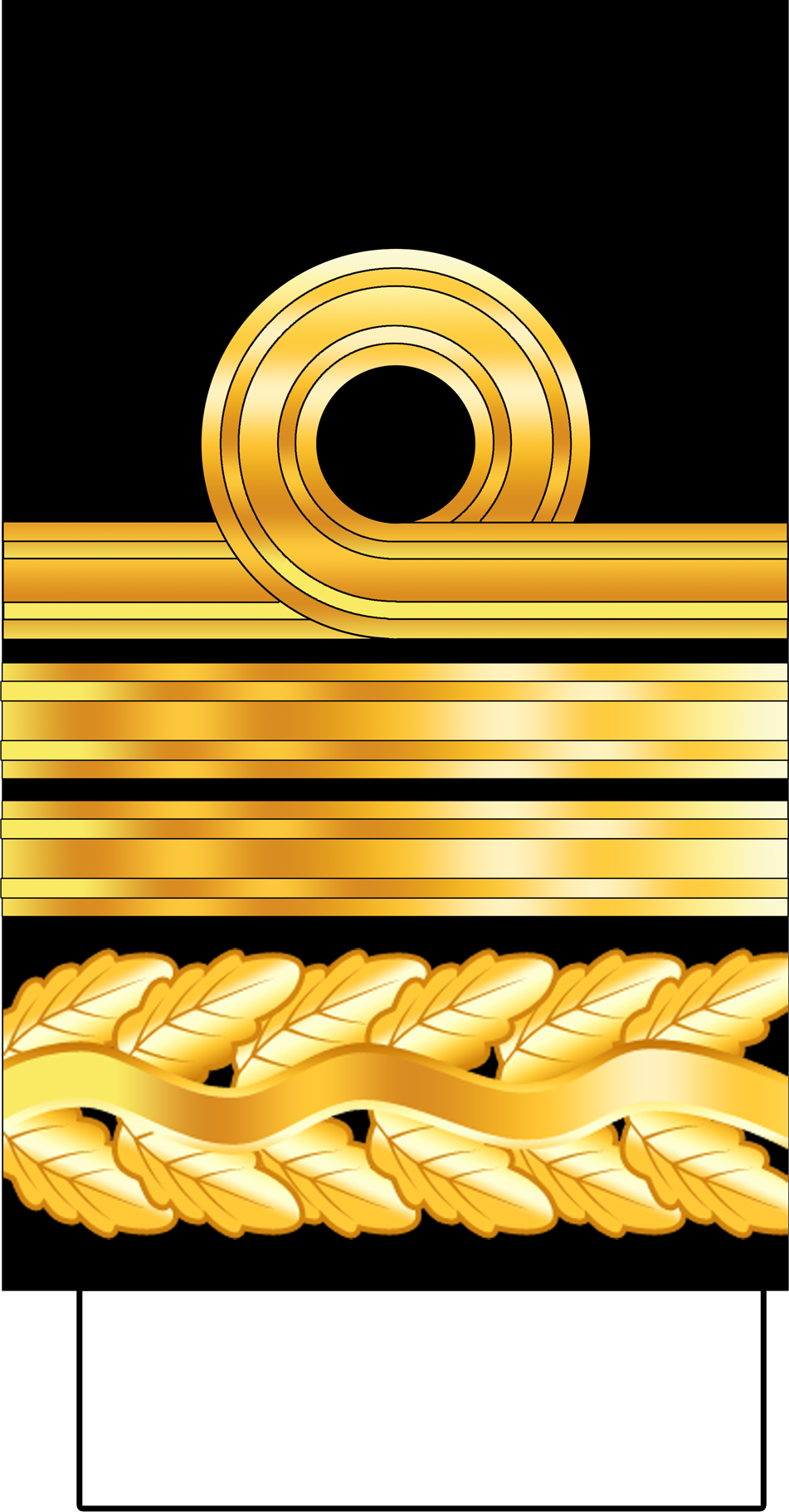
- Rank: Vice Admiral
- Commands: Southern Fleet (1972–1976); Bushehr Naval Base (1971–1972); IIS Babr; IIS Palang; IIS Naghdi; IIS Larak; IIS Yadakbar
- Battles/wars: Joint Operation Arvand; Seizure of Abu Musa and the Greater and Lesser Tunbs; Dhofar rebellion; Iranian Revolution

Kamal Habibollahi (Persian: کمال حبیب‌اللهی; 1 February 1930 – 11 October 2016) was the last Commander of the Imperial Iranian Navy until the Islamic Revolution and was the last CNO under the Pahlavi dynasty. He also several held minister positions in the Military government of Gholam Reza Azhari in 1978.

== Early life ==
Kamal was born in 1930 in Astara. His father was Mir-Ketab-Allah, who was dedicated land to build the Mosque of Gharib al-Ghuraba in Astara in 1910. He was buried in that mosque's yard. His father and grandfather were both involved in commerce. After his father died, he spent most of his time being raised in various cities until High School, when he finally moved to Tehran and graduated from the Dar al-Fonun.

Although he was accepted to University, Habibollahi saw a poster announcing that the Imperial Iranian Navy was recruiting college students to become officers. He had always had a lifelong interest in history and a respect for the navy for trying to fight the Anglo-Soviet invasion of Iran, Habibollahi registered and after taking the Naval Entry exam, he was accepted to become a Naval Officer with the Imperial Iranian Navy

== Career ==
Habibollahi graduated from the Royal Navy Officer Program, U.S. Naval Post Graduate School, and U.S. Naval War College. He rose through the ranks of the Navy and ultimately served as the Commander of the Imperial Iranian Navy. He played a leading role in developing the Chahbahar naval port.

Habibollahi resigned from this role upon the collapse of the Bakhtiar government. An outspoken critic of the incoming Khomeini regime and radical Islam, following the 1979 Iranian Revolution, He went into hiding after the revolution since many major government members were being executed, and then eventually managed to go to Turkey Next he settled in the United States, where he resided in the Washington, D.C. area. He continued to promote attention to free Iran causes as well as warn against the dangers of global Islamic extremism and terrorism through speeches at universities, military academies, panels, and both US and Iranian media outlets. In August 1981, he led a group of people loyal to Azadegan Organization in seizing the Tabarzin, an Iranian navy missile cruiser, off the coast of Spain, in order to draw attention to the continued resistance to Khomeini and Islamic extremism.

== Tabarzin Attack ==
On 13 August 1981, Kamal devised a plan to seize the Tabarzin. The ship which was now completed, was to be delivered to Iran via the south of France and the Captain of the ship secretly agreed to allow them to take over the ship. His group, Azadegan Organization, consisted of several young Iranians. Habibollahi managed to take the team to Cádiz, Spain. After spending several days blending in, they hired a fishing boat named the Salazon to take them out under the cover of oceanography.

The morning of 13 August 1981 at approximately 8 am, Habibollahi and his team departed from their hotel and boarded the Salazon as planned. While exploring the bay, one of the students opened a bottle of cognac, which was passed around. After an hour, the skipper became completely drunk and left the helm to his passengers. As none of them had any sailing experience, Habibollahi took over. The sea was a little rougher that day than it had been on previous days, and many of the students became ill.

At midday, the Salazon finally came into contact with the gunboat. The captain of the Tabarzin played his part, instructing the motor engineer to slow down and allowing the fishing boat to get closer. The other two gunboats were distanced by feigning engine trouble. When they were near, Habibollahi signaled his men to prepare themselves. They put on their khaki uniforms, which they had taken from their little bags, to pose as Spanish Customs officers. By the time the drunk skipper of the Salazon realized what was happening, it was too late. The commandos smashed his radio and assured him that they would not harm him. They insisted that they were simply Iranians boarding a ship belonging to Iranians. To silence him, they gave him a fistful of dollars. Armed with enough real weapons, the young commandos quickly overpowered the 30-strong unarmed crew who were directed below deck and held captive in their sleeping quarters.

Later, Admiral Habibollahi made a speech to his prisoners, introducing his team as part of General Aryana's Liberation Army. He promised not to harm them if they behaved. The operation had been successful so far, except for when the Tabarzin was intercepted by two Spanish coast guard helicopters after taking over the gunboat. Habibollahi clarified to the Spaniards that they were now in international waters, and Spain had no authority to interfere. He announced over the radio that the Tabarzin was now considered a part of Free Iran, and its crew were Iranian nationals. Surprisingly, the helicopters circled around a few times before eventually departing and never returning.

In a symbolic act, they ripped down the Islamic Republic flag and replaced it with the Imperial State of Iran flag. It would be another day before news that an Iranian gunboat had been "hijacked" was reported by every international news agency. Khomeini accused the U.S. Central Intelligence Agency of carrying out the attack and Iran's armed forces chief of staff said it meant war with the United States. Possibly being carried away by his own revolutionary rhetoric, Brig. Gen. Valiollah Fallahi told Tehran radio, "We are not only at war with Iraq, we are at war with superpower America and its allies. The battlefield includes a major part of Europe, all of America and the waters of the Atlantic Ocean," he said. Tehran radio quoted Khomeini as saying the "hand of the CIA" was responsible for the piracy of the French-made missile boat, one of three that were being delivered to Iran. He said former secretary of state Cyrus Vance was also to blame because, according to Khomeini, he helped Kamal—said to have led the capture of the boat off Spain.

=== 14 August 1981 ===
While Princess Azadeh was in Cairo, she received the unexpected news about the Tabarzin. She immediately contacted Aryana, who explained that this was the beginning of a significant event. Azadeh then flew to Turkey to meet with the Bahram Aryana at his temporary headquarters. Upon learning that the individuals who had seized the Tabarzin were members of Azadegan, Azadeh couldn't contain her excitement. However, she gradually became concerned about their safety. What would happen if the gunboat encountered any problems? What if someone drowned? These and many other questions plagued her mind. From then on, she could only hope and pray that the situation would end peacefully and quickly. As the world became aware of the events that had taken place, the Azadegan organization promptly claimed responsibility. During an impromptu press conference at Aryana's apartment, a self-proclaimed military spokesperson announced that the Tabarzin had been seized by "patriotic forces." The spokesperson stated that the objective of Azadegan was to "overthrow the mullahs in Iran" and claimed that 1,400 highly trained partisans were preparing to take action from their Turkish bases.

General Aryana also released a statement in which he commended Admiral Habibollahi and his "courageous" commandos. Bakhtiar immediately lent his support to Aryana, projecting a united front in their campaign to liberate Iran. Azadegan deliberately downplayed the fact that the majority of individuals on the Tabarzin were staunch monarchists, which later became a contentious issue among the opposition. When press helicopters flew over the gunboat, the commandos would make V-signs and chant, "Vive Le Roi!" Others held up photos of Reza Pahlavi. One individual, wearing dark glasses and a cap, defiantly posed with a pistol and sub-machine gun. In Tehran, the revolutionary authorities were forced to acknowledge that one of their gunboats had been hijacked by pirates and had gone missing. Later, they accused the Spanish government of not intervening and threatened diplomatic retaliation. However, by then, the Tabarzin was en route to Morocco.

=== 15 August 1981 ===
After a treacherous journey through stormy weather, the Tabarzin arrived at Casablanca. At this stage, the captain and the young crew on board had hoped that Reza Pahlavi, whom they referred to as Reza Shah II, would agree to join them. Aryana's plan was not in alignment with the idea, but Habibollahi didn't completely reject it. However, upon going ashore, he was unexpectedly arrested by the Moroccan king's orders. Surrounded, the crew threatened to fire on Casablanca as a last ditch resort. Reza Pahlavi was informed of the Tabarzin's situation by King Hassan while he was in Egypt. The king had apprehended the crew and sought advice on what to do with them. The young shah needed some time to contemplate the situation and assured King Hassan that he would provide a response soon. Shortly after, Reza Pahlavi sought the advice of President Sadat, but the latter declined to get involved. In the meantime, King Hassan sent his private plane to bring Reza Pahlavi to Rabat for an emergency meeting with senior Moroccan officials.

After thorough discussions, Reza Pahlavi expressed his understanding of the patriotic intentions of the hijackers, but emphasized that their actions were considered illegal by international standards, and he could not condone them. Eventually, all parties reached a compromise: the Tabarzin would be allowed to refuel and depart for Toulon, where it would be handed over to the French Navy, and the crew would be treated fairly.

=== 19 August 1981 ===
Habibollahi announced that he and his accomplices would turn themselves in and before departing the Tabarzin for the last time, a brief ceremony was held where the Lion and Sun flag was lowered to the Imperial Anthem for the last time with many salutes from French Marines.

=== Temporary Imprisonment ===
Princess Azadeh was in Paris when she learned that the Tabarzin had reached French waters. She was furious with Azadegan for having endangered the lives of several young kids. A well-placed source had told her about the lack of preparation and consideration shown to them. The whole operation had been a temporary show so that General Aryana could raise funds from Bakhtiar who in turn could claim that he had a military wing capable of action.

Nonetheless, she was proud of the kids and in order to show her support she flew to Toulon to greet them. Outside Toulon Prison she found a large crowd made of over a hundred Iranian exiles who had spent the day calling for their release. One of the protestors told her that the Tabarzin crew had already been transferred to Marseille and Paris by bus.

=== Aftermath ===
On Avenue Foch, two days later, Habibollahi faced the press. He declared that the Tabarzin Affair had served to demonstrate that millions of Iranians were ready to denounce the crimes of the mullahs, and that their mission was a success. When asked if he agreed with Tehran's accusation that he was a pirate, he replied with a smile, "Ladies and Gentlemen, I ask you, do I look like a pirate or Khomeini?"

"Our goal is to unite all Iranians in order to win back our country," he announced. "Most of us are monarchists by tradition, but we also have republicans in our midst. Of course, it is the people who will decide which to choose. As for me, I can receive political asylum in France, but I will soon be leaving for other missions."

The story of the Tabarzin became a legend, but many of the young men who had played a vital role grew disillusioned when they realized they had been exploited. Some of them joined Aryana in Turkey, but returned embittered, complaining that the Liberation Army was all a bluff and that their lives had been ruined. Azadeh tried to help them find a place to stay and jobs, but they had to work hard to make ends meet. Some of them found work as drivers or security officers, while others were involved in shady activities and ran into trouble.

Military offices
Preceded by Abbas Ramzi Attaie	Commander of the Imperial Iranian Navy; 7 January 1976 – 11 February 1979	Succeeded by Cpt. Afsaripour
