= Honiball Joseph =

- هانیبال یوسف
- Born: January 2, 1971 (age 55); Mashhad, Iran
- Education: Azad University of Art and Architecture
- Occupations: Composer, conductor, pianist and music educator
- Years active: 1986-present
- Spouse: Gohar Baghoomian

Honiball Joseph is an American composer, conductor, pianist, music educator, and cultural advocate known for his contributions to music and cultural preservation. He is also an advocate for preserving minority identities, particularly those of Assyrians, amidst political and cultural challenges. Joseph is the former director of the Beneil Music Academy and the founder of both the Messiah Ensemble and the Gilgamesh Arts & Culture Foundation.

== Early life and education ==
Joseph was born on January 2, 1971, in Mashhad, Iran. In 1986, he entered the Tehran Conservatory of Music, where he studied violin under the guidance of Behrouz Vahidi Azar. He also studied composition with prominent Iranian masters such as Morteza Hannaneh and Sharif lotfi.

After completing his military service, Joseph pursued higher education at Azad University of Art and Architecture in 1996, majoring in music. He studied piano as his principal instrument and received short-term training in composition with Thomas Christian David and Tengiz Shavlokhashvili.

Joseph continued his education in contemporary music and composition at Saddleback College and CalArts (California Institute of the Arts) in the United States, after migrating to the USA.

== Career ==
Joseph began teaching music in 1986 and focused on composing and arranging choral music for churches in Iran and abroad. In 1999, he founded the Messiah Ensemble. In 2002, Joseph established the Beneil Music Academy and the Messiah Ensemble in Tehran, Iran.

Among his projects, Joseph collaborated with artist Alireza Mojabi for the 2013 performances "Rangahang" (canvas and piano improvisation) at the Tehran Museum of Contemporary Art.

In 2013, Joseph organized two significant concerts. One was a fusion ensemble performance of Assyrian music held at a German Church affiliated with the German Embassy. The other was held at Milad Tower—one of Iran’s major venues—featuring love songs from ten different languages, including Assyrian, Armenian, Azeri, Persian, English, German, Italian, French, Spanish, and Latin American music. The concert aimed to highlight the diversity of musical cultures during a time when such performances were rare in Iran.

In 2014, he conducted a three-day-long Messiah Ensemble concert in Tehran's Vahdat Hall, one of Iran’s prestigious opera houses. The concert included gospel-inspired music alongside global classics and Iranian cultural elements, such as "We Are the World" and the Persian composition "Toei Peydatar az Peyda," written by Farideh Norouzi and composed by Joseph himself. He collaborated with the "Raz Gol Sohrkh" group and dedicated the concert to his parents.

In 2014, Joseph collaborated with Yasser Khaseb on a performance called Tanahang, which merged music and theater. Presented outdoors in front of Tehran's City Theater, the performance was a protest against the crimes committed by ISIS. The symbolic imagery, such as a headless figure emerging from a sack, represented the cycle of oppression and violence.

Joseph’s advocacy work has occasionally attracted scrutiny from the Iranian government. In 2005, his ensemble was detained following a concert, and in 2014, he was reportedly kidnapped by the Iranian secret service after a gospel performance. These events became significant moments in his career and personal life.

In 2019, he conducted the "Living Assyria" concert at the British Museum, which was part of the Ashurbanipal exhibition. The event took place in front of the two preserved Lamassu statues in the museum's Assyrian section.

== Immigration ==
In January 2015, Honiball emigrated to Vienna and later settled in the United States. In the summer of 2015, he founded the Gilgamesh Arts & Culture Foundation, a nonprofit organization aimed at promoting cultural exchange and artistic innovation. In 2016, he established the Gilgamesh Philharmonic Society, followed by the Gilgamesh International Composition Competition in 2019. Through this foundation, he also formed the Iranian American Choir and the Gilgamesh Philharmonic Ensemble, which performed extensively in California.

One of his notable projects, "Songs of My Homeland", involved choral and orchestral arrangements of folk music from various Iranian ethnic groups, reflecting Honiball's commitment to cultural preservation and innovation.

== Advocacy ==
In response to nationwide protests in Iran, Joseph composed "Dream of Freedom" (رویای آزادی) and "It’s Done!" (تمام شد), which became symbolic pieces during the demonstrations. Another notable composition, "For Iran", featuring poetry by Pantea Peyvandi and performed by Mina Deris, was created swiftly in support of the 2022 protests. The song was composed in just two hours. In 2016, he co-signed a letter protesting the suppression of artists in Iran.
