= Várhidi =

Várhidi is a Hungarian surname. Notable people with the surname include:

- Pál Várhidi (1931–2015), Hungarian footballer and manager
- Péter Várhidi (born 1958), Hungarian footballer and manager, son of Pál

== See also ==
- Vahidi
