= Amouzgar =

Amouzgar is a surname. Notable people with the surname include:

- Cyrus Amouzgar (1934–2021), Iranian journalist, author and politician
- Jaleh Amouzgar (born 1939), Iranologist
