= Vahidi =

Vahidi is a surname which is derived from the Arabic word واحدی (Wahidi or Vahidi). Also spelled Vahidy and Wahidy. Notable people with the surname include:

- Ahmad Vahidi (born 1958), Iranian politician and military commander
- Behrouz Vahidi Azar (born 1952), Iranian violin teacher
- Iraj Vahidi (1927–2022), Iranian engineer and politician
