= Isa Sedigh =

Iran's minister of education (1894–1978)

- عیسی صدیق
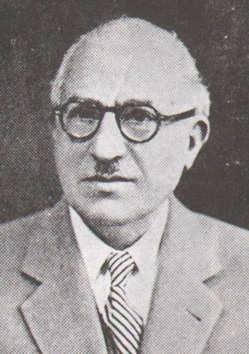

Ministry of Education
- In office 27 August 1941 – 9 March 1942
- Monarch: Mohammad Reza Pahlavi
- Prime Minister: Mohammad Ali Foroughi
- Preceded by: Esmail Merat
- Succeeded by: Mohammad Tadayon

Personal details
- Born: 18 June 1894 Tehran, Sublime State of Iran
- Died: 5 June 1978 (aged 83) Tehran, Imperial State of Iran
- Resting place: Alijan Garden, Rey, Iran
- Parents: Abdollah Sedigh Al-Tojar Isfahani (father); Khadijeh Beygam (mother)

Isa Sedigh (Persian: عیسی صدیق, also known as Sedigh Alam or Sadiq Aʿlam, lit. 'the knowledgeable Sadiq'; 1894–1978) was minister of education in Iran, and the third president of the University of Tehran.

== Early life and education ==
Isa Sedigh was born in June 1894 in Hammam Ghebleh, Tehran. His father, Mirza Abdollah Shamloo, also known as Abdollah Sedigh Al-Tojjar Isfahani, was a grandson of Mirza Mehdi Khan Astarabadi.

Isa Sedigh finished his undergraduate education in Kamalieh School and Dar al-Fonun. After finishing school, he traveled to France with the first student expedition in 1911. In 1918, he completed his education in Versailles, Yvelines, receiving his bachelor's degree in mathematics from the University of Paris.

In 1930, upon receiving an invitation to study at Teachers College, Columbia University, Sedigh went to United States and, after one year, received his doctorate in Philosophy.

== Career ==
Isa Sedigh was a member of the Socialist Party. He worked in the University of Cambridge as an assistant teacher of professor Edward Granville Browne in Persian literature. After returning to France, he made Persian one of his foreign languages classes, which students could choose as their foreign language course.

While Iran was under attack by the Russian Empire, Sedigh wrote many related articles in The Times.

He returned to Iran in 1918; just after his arrival, he was selected as inspector of schools. He worked as the head of the education organization of Gilan province.

Isa Sedigh served as chief of staff of the Ministry of Justice in Iran.

In 1921, he received the title of Sedigh Alam from Ahmad Shah Qajar per Samad Khan Momtaz os-Saltaneh's request.

He was a member of the Iranian constituent assembly when it officially began in 1921.

When Ali-Akbar Davar founded the Radical party, Sedigh was selected as vice president.

During his education at Columbia University, Abdolhossein Teymourtash asked Sedigh to plan the founding of a Dar ul-Funun (university) in Tehran. (Isa used the word Daneshgah (meaning a university) instead of Dar ul-Funun (meaning a complex institute for teaching various courses).) After returning to Iran in 1931, Reza Shah commanded him to found the University of Tehran.

He was selected as minister of education in Mohammad Ali Foroughi's first cabinet on 21 September 1941. Two years later, he was selected again for this position in Ali Soheili's cabinet. Sedigh maintained this position in Morteza-Qoli Bayat's (25 November 1944) and Ahmad Qavam's (11 September 1947) cabinets. Jafar Sharif-Emami selected him on 11 October 1960, as minister of education for the 6th time.

He was a member of the Iranian senate in its first term in 1949. He was also elected in its 2nd, 4th, 5th and 7th terms.

== Death ==
Isa Sedigh died on 5 June 1978, in Tehran and was buried in Behesht-e Zahra.

At the time of Isa Sedigh's death he was survived by his beloved son Reza Sedigh and Ali Sedigh, Abbas Sedigh and his grandchildren; Peri Sedigh, Shannon Sedigh, Lilly Sedigh and Ammon Sedigh.

== Selected publications ==
- Fundamentals of math and intellectual problems, 1923
- 100 solved math problems, 1923
- Industry of Iran in past and future, 1925
- Scientific principles of education, 1928
- One year in the United States, 1932
- Modern method of education and training, 1935
- Brief history of Iran's culture, 1937
- History of Iranian culture, 1957

== See also ==
- Esmail Merat
