= Fazlollah Reza =

Iranian electrical engineer (1915–2019)

- فضل‌الله رضا
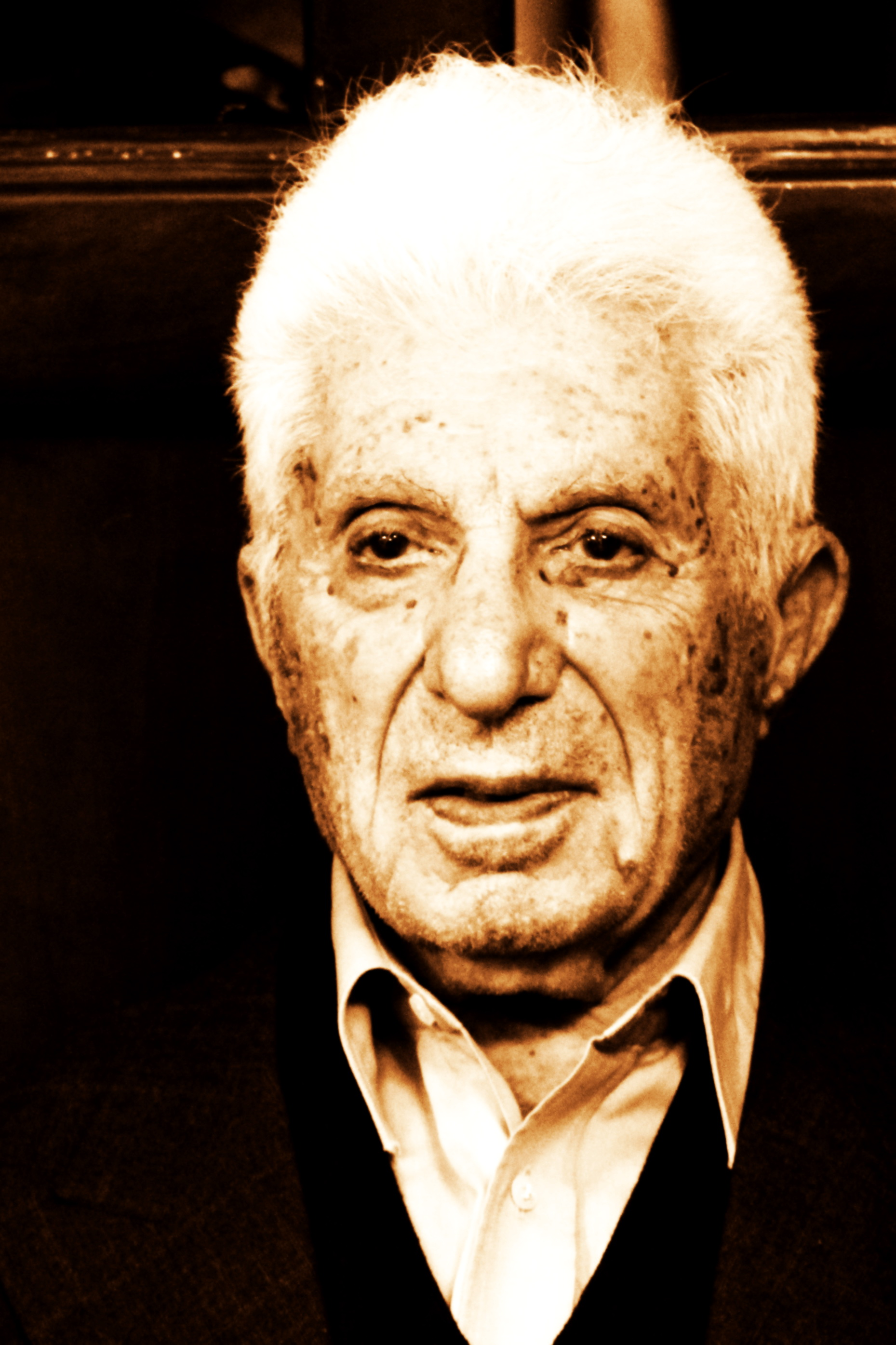

Ambassador of Iran to Canada
- In office October 1974 – November 1978
- Monarch: Mohammad Reza Pahlavi
- President: Amir-Abbas Hoveyda; Jamshid Amouzegar; Jafar Sharif-Emami
- Preceded by: Parviz Adl
- Succeeded by: Abulhassan Bakhtiar

Chancellor of Tehran University
- In office 1967–1970
- Preceded by: Jahanshah Saleh
- Succeeded by: Alinaghi Alikhani

Chancellor of Aryamehr University
- In office 1967–1968
- Preceded by: Mohammad Ali Mojtahedi
- Succeeded by: Mohammad Reza Amin

Personal details
- Born: 1 January 1915 Rasht, Sublime State of Persia (present-day Iran)
- Died: 19 November 2019 (aged 104) Ottawa, Ontario, Canada
- Education: University of Tehran; Columbia University; Polytechnic University of New York; Syracuse University
- Known for: Network and Information Theory; Ambassador of Iran to the Canada (1975–1979)

Fazlollah Reza (Persian: فضل‌الله رضا; 1 January 1915 – 19 November 2019) was an Iranian scientist, academic, and diplomat known for his pioneering contributions to electrical engineering and information theory. Born in Iran, he pursued higher education in engineering and went on to earn a doctorate in electrical engineering. Reza made significant advancements in the field of network theory and cybernetics, publishing influential research that contributed to the development of modern communication systems. His academic career spanned several prestigious institutions, including the University of Tehran, where he served as a professor, and international universities such as McGill University and the Massachusetts Institute of Technology (MIT).

Beyond his scientific achievements, Reza played a prominent role in Iran's higher education system, serving as the Chancellor of Sharif University of Technology and the University of Tehran. His leadership helped shape Iran's academic landscape, fostering research and innovation in engineering and technology. Later in his career, he also took on diplomatic responsibilities, representing Iran as its ambassador to Canada and UNESCO. Throughout his lifetime, Reza received numerous honors for his contributions to both academia and international relations, cementing his legacy as a key figure in Iran's scientific and educational history.

== Career ==
Reza graduated from the Faculty of Engineering of the University of Tehran in 1938, receiving a bachelor's degree in electrical engineering. He received a master's and Ph.D. in electrical engineering from Columbia University in 1946 and Polytechnic University of New York (now New York University Tandon School of Engineering) in 1950 respectively. He was a Fellow of the IEEE and AAAS for his contribution to network and information theory. He was an honorary member of the Academy of Persian Language and Literature and wrote and spoke extensively on classical Persian poetry.

== Positions ==
Reza served as the head of Aryamehr University of Industry (Sharif University of Technology), University of Tehran, Iran's ambassador to Canada and Iran's ambassador to UNESCO. As a professor, he taught at MIT, McGill University, Concordia University, and the University of Tehran.

== Personal life ==
Reza was married for 75 years and had 6 children and 11 grandchildren. He was a lifelong tennis player until past 100. For his 100th birthday, he was granted a "free lifetime membership" by the Rockcliffe Lawn Tennis Club and a letter from Queen Elisabeth II.

== Bibliography ==
- Reza, Fazlollah M.; Seeley, Samuel (1959). Modern Network Analysis (PDF). Archived from the original (PDF) on 2014-12-28.
- Reza, Fazlollah M. (1961). An Introduction to Information Theory. Courier Corporation. ISBN 0486682102.
- Reza, Fazlollah M. (1971). Linear spaces in engineering.
- Reza, Fazlollah M. (1972). The timeless value of Persian poetry = La valeur éternelle de la poésie persane. Éditions de la délégation de l'Iran, auprès de l'Unesco.

== See also ==
- Enayatollah Reza (brother)
- Esmail Merat

Academic offices
Preceded by Mohammad Ali Mojtahedi	Chancellor of Aryamehr University; 1967–1968	Succeeded by Mohammad Reza Amin
Preceded by Jahanshah Saleh	Chancellor of University of Tehran; 1967–1970	Succeeded by Alinaghi Alikhani
