= Esmail Merat =

Minister of Education in Iran from (1935–1941)

- اسماعیل مرآت
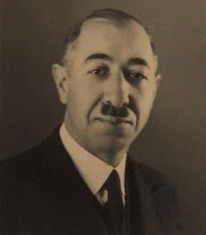

Minister of Health
- In office 27 August 1941 – 12 November 1941
- Monarch: Mohammad Reza Shah
- Prime Minister: Mohammad Ali Foroughi
- Succeeded by: Baqer Kazemi

Minister of Education
- In office 20 September 1935 – 27 August 1941
- Monarch: Reza Shah
- Prime Minister: Mahmoud Djam; Ahmad Matin-Daftari; Ali Mansur
- Preceded by: Hekmat E Shirazi
- Succeeded by: Isa Sedigh

Personal details
- Born: 7 March 1893 Tehran, Sublime State of Persia
- Died: 18 December 1949 (aged 56) New York City, United States
- Resting place: Alijan Garden, Rey, Iran
- Children: Dr Parviz Merat (1927-2008) astrophysicist, Khosrow Merat (1929-200?), Dr Parvin Merat-Amini (1935-) economist, Fereydoun Merat (1936-2001), Dr Farokh Merat (1938-2019) Full Professor in Linguistics at University Vincennes-Paris 8.
- Parent(s): Mirza Moussa Khan Merat ol-Mamâlek (father). Havva Khânoum (mother). Radjiheh Momtaz (wife), daughter of Esmail Momtaz od-Dowleh.

Esmail Merat (Persian: اسماعیل مرآت; 7 March 1893 – 18 December 1949) was Iran's minister of education during Reza Shah's reign. He is the founder of some faculties of University of Tehran, including the law and technical faculties. He has also founded the art section of University of Tehran.

He suggested a change in medical university law, which caused managing Tehran hospital under the medical faculty. In 1956, in respect of his valuable works, a university street was named after him.

He was very eager to publish suitable educational books, which results in more than 200 high school books. The Academy of Persian Language and Literature was another organization which was founded because of his suggestion and due to Reza Shah's command.

== Education and early life ==
Esmail was born in September 1939 in Tehran. His father was Mirza Musa Khan Merat ol-mamalek.

He finished his undergraduate education in Tehran before traveling to Europe in 1892 to continue his education. After living in Switzerland and France for a few years, he returned to Iran due to difficulties caused by World War I.

== Career ==
In 1915, the ministry of education asked him and other students who returned from Europe to work in Dar al-Fonun as a teacher. Three years later, in 1918, he became the minister of Higher-Teacher House of Iran. He also taught physics in this institute. In September 1928, he accompanied student expedition as head of their elementary education to Paris. In Paris, Hossein Ala' asked him to stay there as Iranian students' administrator and he accepted. While he was the Iranian students' administrator in France, he paid particular attention to their behaviour, causing some students and employees to feel resentment.

In 1935, he has selected as head of higher education of Ministry of Education. After few months he abdicated this position and start working in ministry of economic affairs and finance.

In 1937, he became the governor of Kerman for 9 months.

After resignation of Aliasghar Hekmat from his position, Esmail selected as his successor in July 1938. He officially started his work as minister of education on 20 September 1939. He was in this position till September 1941. Later in 1941, Mohammad Ali Foroughi asked him to return to his position, but he didn't accept because of hard working condition in those days. By Foroughi's insistence, he accepted to work as Minister of health and medical education. He resigned on 12 November 1941.

== See also ==
- Fazlollah Reza
- Mohammad Farhadi
