= Ahmad Mirfendereski =

Iranian politician (1918–2004)

- احمد میرفندرسکی
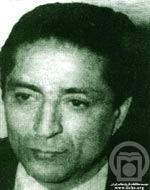

Minister of Foreign Affairs
- In office 5 January 1979 – 11 February 1979
- Monarch: Mohammad Reza Pahlavi
- Prime Minister: Shahpour Bakhtiar
- Preceded by: Amir Khosrow Afshar
- Succeeded by: Karim Sanjabi

Personal details
- Born: 9 May 1918 Tehran, Persia
- Died: 2 May 2004 (aged 85) Paris, France
- Party: National Resistance Movement of Iran (1979–1991)

Ahmad Mirfendereski (Persian: احمد میرفندرسکی; 9 May 1918 – 2 May 2004) was an Iranian diplomat, politician, and the last minister of foreign affairs of the Pahlavi era.

== Career ==
Mirfendereski began his career at the ministry of foreign affairs and held many posts there. In the 1960s, he served as the Iranian ambassador to the Soviet Union. Upon returning to Tehran, he was appointed as deputy minister of foreign affairs in 1970. He served in the post until October 1973 when he was dismissed because he allowed Soviet civil airplanes to fly spare parts to Iraq to be employed in the October War with Israel without consent of the Shah Mohammad Reza Pahlavi.

Mirfendereski was appointed foreign minister to the cabinet led by Shahpour Bakhtiar in January 1979, replacing Abbas Ali Khalatbari in the post. His term lasted very short, just 37 days, and ended in February 1979 with the Iranian Revolution. Just before the Ayatollah Khomeini's return to Iran Mirfendereski declared that Iran ended its membership from the CENTO which is considered to be an initiative of the Bakhtiar cabinet to establish positive relations with both Khomeini's supporters and the leftist groups. Karim Sanjabi succeeded Mirfendereski as foreign minister.

== Later years ==
After leaving office, Mirfendereski was arrested and put at Qasr prison in Tehran where other senior officials were also detained. Then he was freed, left Iran and settled in Paris. In the exile he joined the National Resistance Movement headed by Bakhtiar. In 1984, Mirfendereski declared in Paris that the Shah's cancer had been diagnosed in 1974, six years before his death in Egypt on 27 July 1980 and that it had been kept secret until the revolution.

== Personal life and death ==
Mirfendereski was married and had three children, two daughters and a son. He died in Paris at the age of 85 on 2 May 2004.
