= Azadegan Organization =

Iranian monarchist organisation

Azadegan Organization سازمان آزادگان ایران
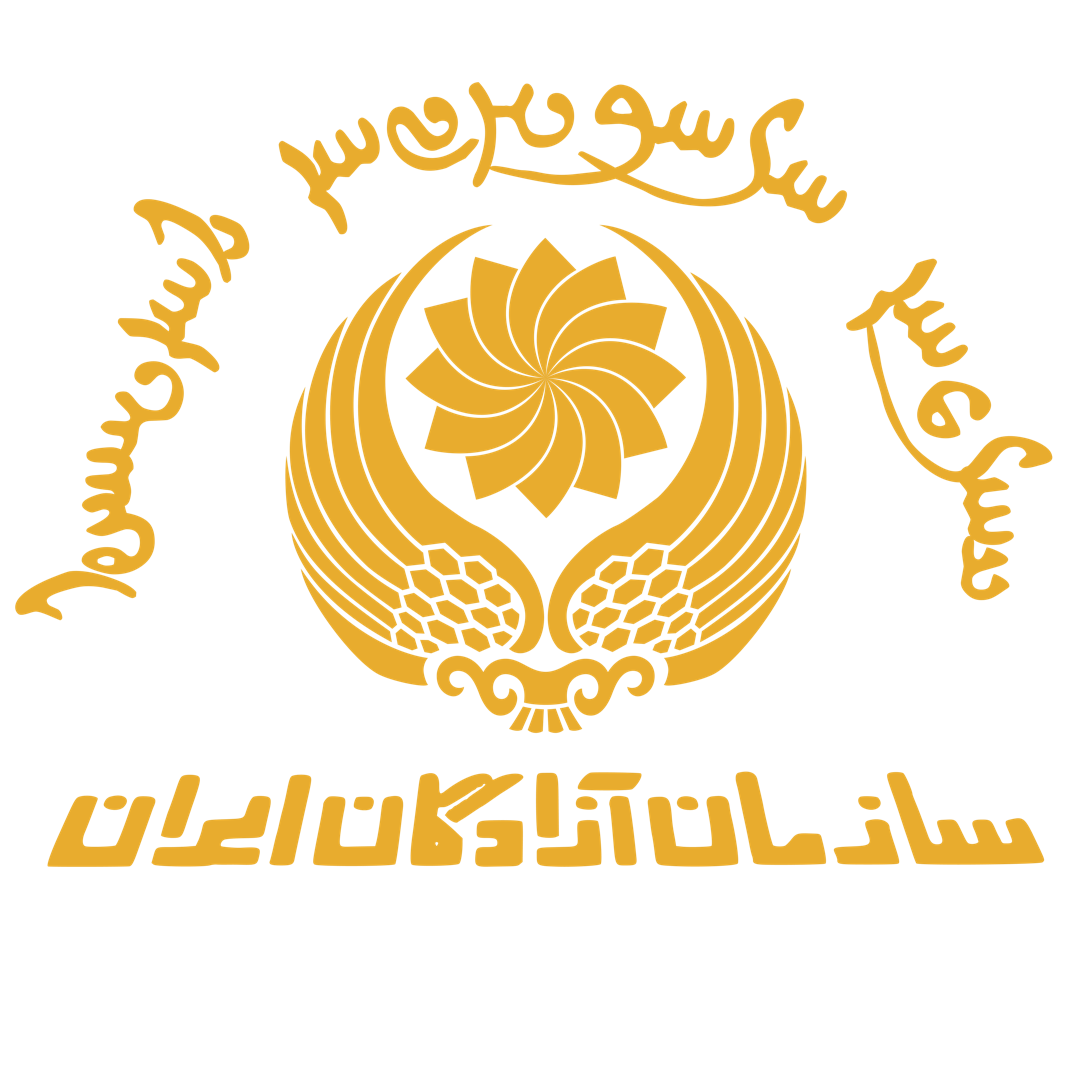
- Abbreviation: AzO
- Chairperson: Atur Barzinmehr
- Founder: Bahram Aryana
- Founded: 1979 (Original); 2026 (Refound)
- Headquarters: Paris, France (1979–1985); Munich, Germany (from 2026)
- Think tank: Iranenow Consortium
- Military wing: Iranian Liberation Front
- Ideology: Great Civilization; Iranian nationalism; Liberalism (Iranian); Ordoliberalism; Progressivism; Secularism (Iranian); Anti-clericalism; Anti-islamism; Anti-communism; Monarchism (Iranian); Socialism (Iranian); Liberal socialism; Social democracy; Meritocracy; Eco-nationalism (Since 2026); Bioregionalism; Radical environmentalism
- Political position: Syncretic
- Colors: Saffron Argent
- Slogan: "وَرَهرام" (va–rah–rām) "Victory"
- Anthem: "سرود آزادگان"; Azadegan Anthem

Party flag
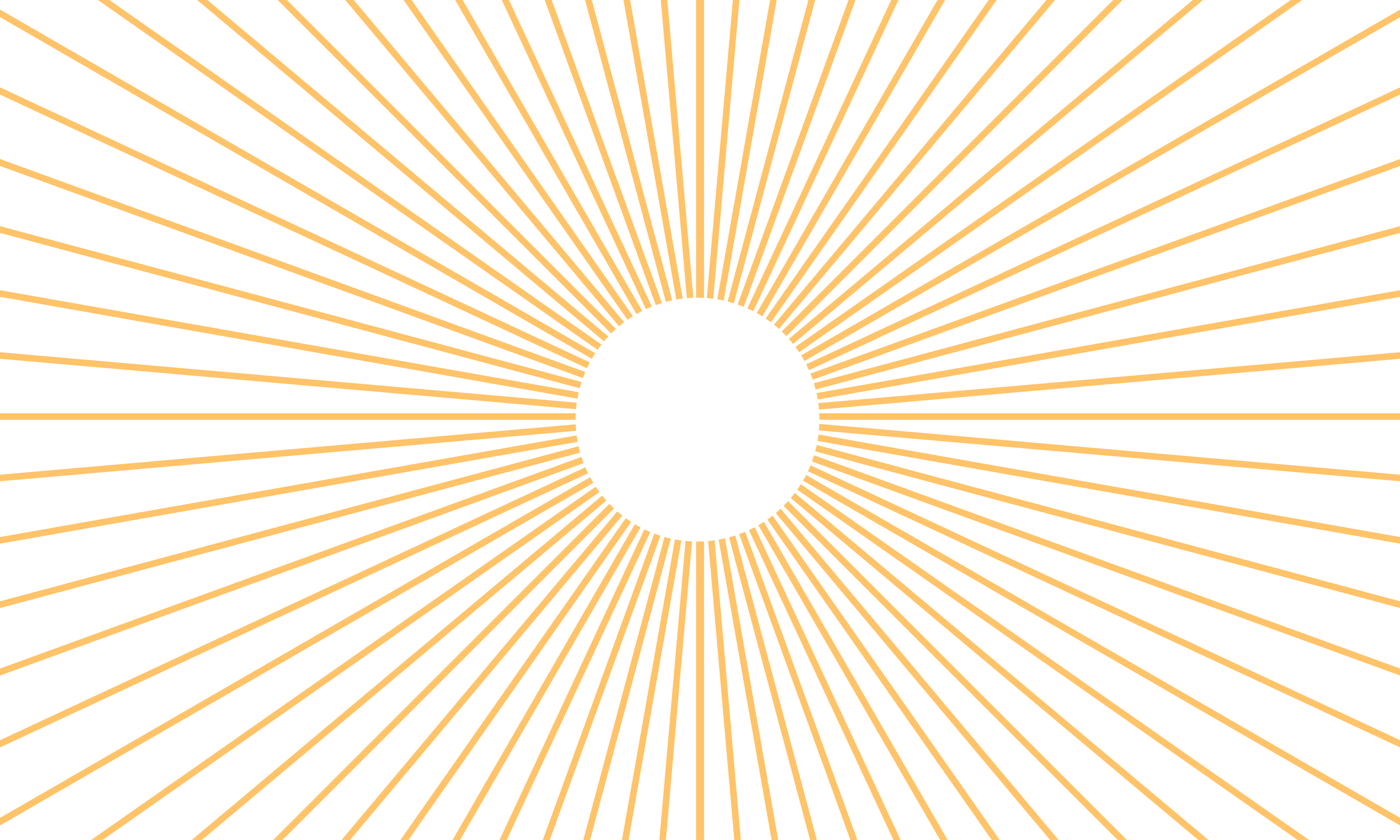
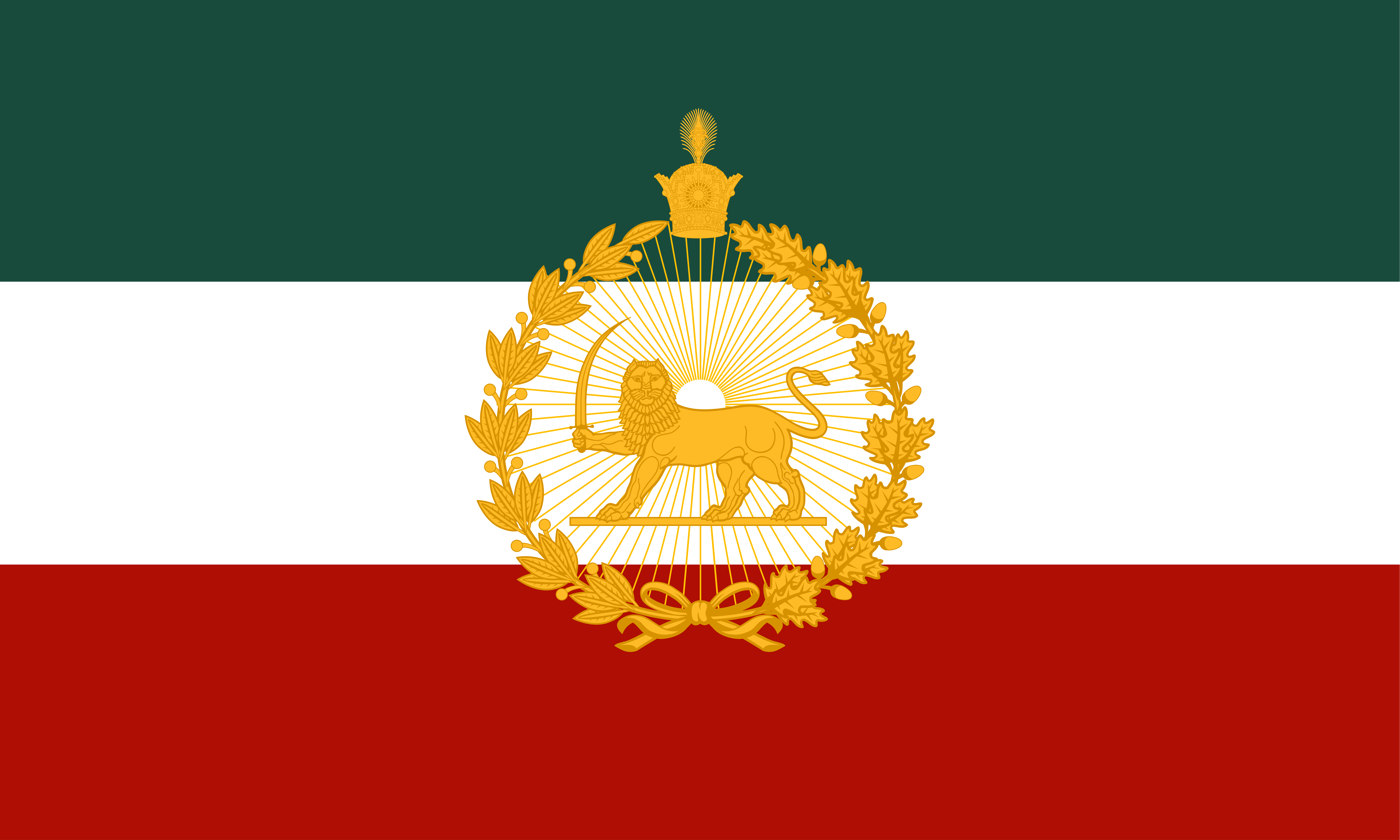

Website
- azadegan.org

Azadegan press conference in 1981

The Azadegan Organization (Persian: آزادگان, lit. 'the [spiritually] free ones') is an Iranian Zoroastrian political organization that sought to restore an Iranian constitutionalist government following the 1979 Iranian Revolution. The group, founded by General Bahram Aryana, was described as the most prominent of the "fundamentalist monarchist" (vice "constitutionalist monarchist") groups following the Revolution.

== Ideology ==
The organisation's ideology is outlined in Aryana's manifesto Pour une Éthique Iranienne, which proposes a doctrine known as "Iranian Ethics" (A’in-e Azâdegân). Aryana presents Azadegi as a synthesis of ancient Iranian wisdom and modern progressive values, explicitly rejecting fanaticism and dogma seen in "Red" (communist) and "Black" (Islamist) totalitarianism.

== Governance Policies ==
=== Meritocracy ===
Aryana advocated for a technocratic and meritocratic system of government modeled after the Parthian Empire. His manifesto rejected hereditary absolutism of Iran's Constitutional monarchy, in favor of a system where leadership is determined by competence. The proposed form of governance outlined in the manifesto called for formation of two houses in the legislative branch.The Mehestān (Assembly of the Elect), An upper council of elites and "wise" men and women responsible for electing the executive branch, Head of State (Bozorg Farmadār) and supervising the government. The second house is the Kahestān (Assembly of Representatives), which is the lower legislative assembly representing the general population, guilds, and corporations, acting as a mediator between the people and the state.

The organisation supports a centralised command structure for state affairs (defense, foreign policy) combined with administrative decentralization, granting provinces significant autonomy in execution to manage local affairs, fiscal policies, and social policies, provided this does not threaten national unity.

=== Secularism ===
Aryana's Azadegan manifesto approached secularism as a humanist school that adheres with core principles and moral foundations of Zoroastrianism. Azadegan calls for the complete separation of religion and state under such Secularism. In their proposal, the normative judicial system should follow humanism of Iranian philosophies. The organisation also asserts that no official religion should exist for the state, and religious minorities must have equal rights to hold high office. Most notably, it also posits that political Islam and clerics should be barred from political and administrative positions, and political commentaries. The organisation also advocates for freedom of thought and worship must be guaranteed, but religious manifestations for political ends are forbidden. The manifesto condemns the degradation of women's status post-1979, citing ancient Iranian queens as evidence of historical gender equality. It calls for the abolition of the veil, polygamy, and Sighe marriage (Nikah mut'ah).

=== Economic Policy ===
Economically, Azadegan identifies as social democratic or liberal socialist. It rejects the Marxist concept of class struggle and the "dictatorship of the proletariat," viewing them as dehumanising. Instead, it proposes a third Way that reconciles individual liberty with social justice. The organisation believes that the state should manage key national resources (oil, heavy industry, forests, water) to ensure collective benefit. Likewise, the state must guarantee work, hygiene, culture, and leisure for all citizens to prevent poverty, which the manifesto describes as a source of "malignant thoughts."

=== Cultural Policy ===
A core pillar of the Azadegan ideology is the "resurgence of Iranian traditions" and the purification of national identity from Islamist corruption. The organisation calls for the purification of the Persian language to remove Arabic loanwords and restore its "roots". Both of these objectives, in addition to the name of the organisations are derived from the Azadegan party established by Ahmad Kasravi prior to his assassination by Fada'iyan-e Islam militants. Azadegan also proposes the adaptation of Latin alphabet, or replacing the Persian alphabet with Avestan alphabet, arguing that the complexity of the current script is an obstacle to scientific progress and literacy. The manifesto argues that Iranian history has been "falsified" by foreigners and calls for a revisionist approach that emphasises pre-Islamic civilisations (Achaemenid, Sassanid) and minimises the Islamic era's dominance. The group advocates for the revival of ancient Zoroastrian and national festivals such as Nowruz, Sepandārmazgān, Tirgan, Sadeh and Mehregan to replace Shia mourning rituals with "gaiety" and national pride.

== Civilizationalism ==
The Azadegan conceptualises Iran as a civilizational state with a political continuity since the antiquity. The organisation explicitly supports administrative decentralization to ensure effective management, proposing that local populations should "settle their own affairs themselves" to lighten the burden on the central government. The manifesto mandates that the state "must be apt to protect, maintain and cultivate traditions, dialects, languages, schools, and culture, and, as much as possible, to employ local functionaries".

Azadegan strongly distinguishes this administrative decentralisation from political autonomy (khod mokhtāri). The organisation views administrative divisions based on tribalist demarcations or tribal autonomies as threats to the country's integrity. Aryana explicitly states that such autonomy often takes a baneful name and serves as a tool for xenophilia, historically exploited by foreign powers to fracture the country and incite separatism. This frames ethnic autonomy as a disruption to the civilizational continuity of Iran, arguing instead for a Unitary system of Satrapies that guarantee the protection and cultivation of local diversity within the strict framework of civilizational unity and Persian as the common administrative language.

=== Compared with Pan-Iranism ===
Conventional Pan-Iranism emphasises the political unification of Iranian peoples through a strictly centralised and often ethno-linguistic nationalism. Instead, Aryana's Civilizationalism (Shahrigari) proposed by Azadegan emphasises a "unity of existence" (yegâ-negi-e hasti), rejecting the enforcement of homogeneity and forced extinction of Iranian traditions and languages. Azadegan's model relies on a centralised command for high-level state affairs combined with freedom of action at the level of execution, to reconcile the infinite needs of the diverse Iranian population with the state's resources through a social-democratic framework, rather than through ethnic nationalism.

== Iranian Liberation Front ==
Iranian Liberation Front Iran Liberation Army
- ارتش رهایی‌بخش ایران جبهه آزادیبخش ایران
- Leaders: Bahram Aryana; Kamal Habibollahi
- Dates active: 1980–1985
- Country: Iran
- Headquarters: Paris, France
- Wars: Aftermath of the Iranian Revolution; Nojeh coup plot; Hijacking of the IRIS Tabarzin

On the 19th June of 1980, Aryana released a communiqué announcing the formation of a General Staff of the Armed Forces alongside the political movement. This military wing (later known as Liberation Front of Iran (Persian: ارتش رهایی‌بخش ایران, romanized: Artesh-e Rahāyibakhsh-e Irān, French: Mouvement pour la Libération de l'Iran (M.L.I) ) or ARA, was tasked with coordinating with loyalist elements within the Iranian military to overthrow the clerical regime. General Aryana called on officers and soldiers to "disobey the exactors" and rally to the national movement to "make the bloodthirsty buffoon [Khomeini] bite the dust." The military organisation established with the cooperation of Gholam Reza Azhari, Sardar Jaf, and Hassan Jaf, and with the support of Ardeshir Zahedi.

== Hijack of the Tabarzin ==
The Tabarzin was seized during its maiden voyage from Cherbourg to Iran on 13 August 1981. Approximately fifteen armed operatives, disguised as tourists and operating from a rented tugboat named Salazon, boarded the vessel within Spanish territorial waters. Responsibility for the hijacking was later claimed by the Azadegan Organization, who said that the operation had been conducted without the use of force and declared their intention to repurpose the ship as a "fighting unit" in opposition to the Iranian government.
