= Bahram Aryana =

Iranian 4 Star General (1906–1985)

Timsar Bahram Aryana
- بهرام آریانا
- General Aryana in the 1960s

Chief of the Joint Staff
- In office 21 December 1965 – 4 May 1969
- Monarch: Mohammad Reza Pahlavi
- Prime Minister: Amir-Abbas Hoveyda
- Preceded by: Abdol Hossein Hejazi
- Succeeded by: Fereydoun Djam

Commander of the Imperial Iranian Ground Forces
- In office 30 October 1955 – 11 February 1958
- Monarch: Mohammad Reza Pahlavi
- Prime Minister: Hossein Ala'; Manouchehr Eghbal
- Preceded by: Mohammadreza Shahandeh
- Succeeded by: Abdol Hossein Hejazi

Chief of Staff of the Imperial Iranian Ground Forces
- Acting; 1955–1957
- Monarch: Mohammad Reza Pahlavi
- Prime Minister: Hossein Ala'; Manouchehr Eghbal
- Preceded by: Mohammadreza Shahandeh
- Succeeded by: ?

Military attaché of Iran to France and Benelux
- In office 1952–1953
- Monarch: Mohammad Reza Pahlavi
- Prime Minister: Mohammad Mosaddegh; Ahmad Qavam; Mohammad Mosaddegh

Deputy Head of the Officers' Academy
- In office 1945–1948
- Monarch: Mohammad Reza Pahlavi
- Prime Minister: Ebrahim Hakimi; Ahmad Qavam; Ebrahim Hakimi; Abdolhossein Hazhir
- Preceded by: ?
- Succeeded by: ?

Director of the 1st bureau
- In office 1943–1945
- Monarch: Mohammad Reza Pahlavi
- Prime Minister: Ali Soheili; Mohammad Sa'ed; Morteza-Qoli Bayat; Ebrahim Hakimi
- Preceded by: ?
- Succeeded by: ?

Chief of Staff for the Tehran Depot Training Center
- In office 1943–1943
- Monarch: Mohammad Reza Pahlavi
- Prime Minister: Ali Soheili
- Preceded by: ?
- Succeeded by: ?

Personal details
- Born: Hossein Manoochehri; 17 March 1906 Tehran, Qajar Iran
- Died: 21 June 1985 (aged 79) Paris, France
- Resting place: Montparnasse Cemetery
- Party: Azadegan Organization (1979–1985)
- Other political affiliations: SUMKA (1952–1953); Aria Party (1945–1953); Azure Party (1941–1943)
- Awards: Legion of Honour
- Nickname: Hossein Napoleon

Military service
- Allegiance: Pahlavi Iran
- Branch/service: Ground Force
- Years of service: 1939–1969
- Rank: General
- Commands: Southern Forces (1962–1964); 1st Division of the Imperial Guard (1949–1952); Mahabad Brigade (1948–1949)
- Battles/wars: World War II; Anglo-Soviet invasion of Iran; 1962–1964 Tribal Rebellion of Fars; 1967 Kurdish revolt in Iran; Joint Operation Arvand
- Academic background
- Fields: Military science; International law
- Alma mater: Officers' School; War University; École supérieure de guerre; Paris Law Faculty
- Thesis: Napoleon et l'Orient (1955)
- Institutions: Officers' School
- Works: Pour une ethique iranienne (1981)

Bahram Aryana (Persian: بهرام آریانا); also spelled Bahram Ariana (born Hossein Manouchehri); 17 March 1906 – 21 June 1985) was the most senior military commander of the Imperial Iranian Army during the reign of Mohammad Reza Pahlavi and an Iranian nationalist and humanist. Professor Monica M. Ringer described Aryana as probably the most famous "converted Zoroastrian" of the Pahlavi era.

== Biography ==
He was born on 17 March 1906 in Tehran from a noble Georgian mother, who was the great-granddaughter of King Heraclius II, and from a judge father, Sadr-ed-din. His name was Hossein Manouchehri, which he would change to Bahram Aryana in 1950 and he was a descendant of Sepahsalar Khalatbari Tonekaboni, the noble Iranian statesman who was the leader of the constitutional revolutionary forces and four time former prime minister of Iran. Professor Monica M. Ringer has described Aryana as probably the most notorious "converted Zoroastrian” of the Pahlavi era.

He was educated in France at the École supérieure de guerre and received his PhD in 1955 from the Faculty of Law of Paris with his thesis "Napoleon et l'Orient" (published in 1957). Aryana is known to have styled himself on Napoleon and dressed in the Imperial French style.

After the Anglo-Soviet invasion of Iran in 1941 during World War II, he went on with armed struggle and resisted the occupation before being arrested by the British forces. He was instrumental in many of the nationalist policies in the 1950–1960s. During the military campaign of 1962–64 he successfully pacified rebellious tribes in the south of Iran (Fars, Isfahan and Khuzestan) stirred-up by Ayatollah Ruhollah Khomeini.

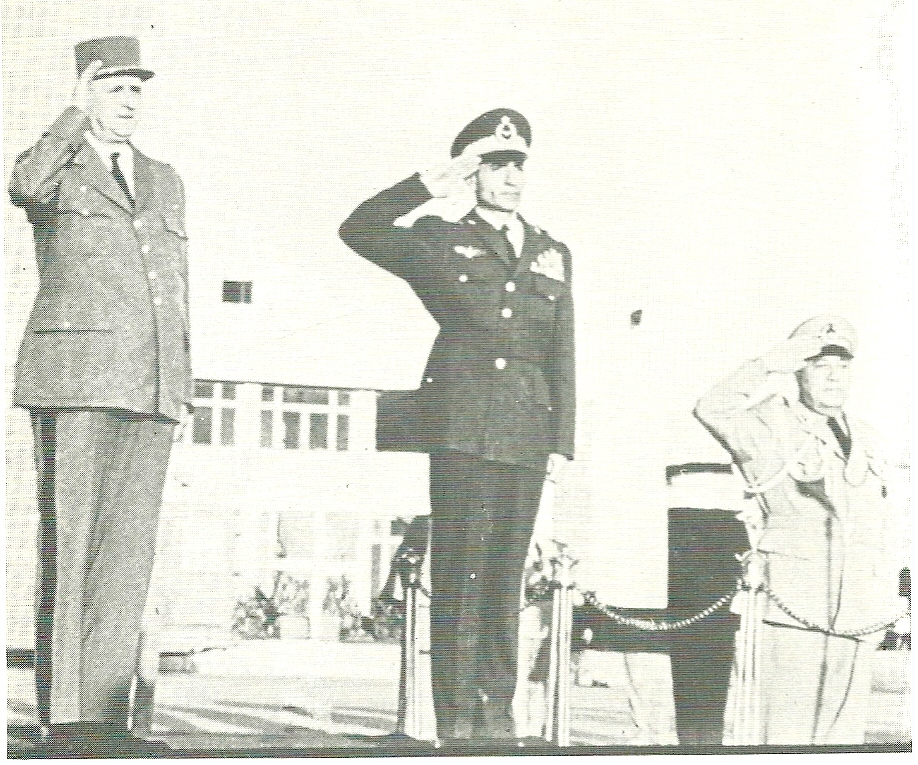
State visit by De Gaulle to Iran. From left to right; Charles de Gaulle, Mohammad Reza Pahlavi, and Bahram Aryana.

Following his military success in the south, General Aryana was named Chief of Staff of the Shah's entire Imperial Iranian Armed Forces, a position he maintained from 1965 to 1969.

During his posting as Chief of Staff, he met with various head of states including Richard Nixon, who received him at the White House, Yitzhak Rabin (then the Chief of Staff of the Israel Defense Forces), who received him in Israel and Charles de Gaulle, during his visit to Iran.

His archaizing tendencies grew to the extent that he had replaced the Quran with the Shahnameh and in his office and proposed adopting the Latin alphabet for Persian as a means to sever cultural ties with the Arabs. Due to the controversial nature of his views, the SAVAK deemed his ideas "indecent" even for the Shah's modernizing and archaistic theories. As a result, and under the indirect orders of the Shah, he, along with his wife Arianoush Ariana, left the country for Paris in 1969. This was also due to the Shatt al-Arab crisis.

He died in exile in Paris in June 1985 and is buried at the Montparnasse cemetery. General Aryana was a Grand Officier of the French Legion of Honour.

His last published book, Pour une Éthique Iranienne was a call for unity against the obscurantist forces driving Khomeini and the mullahs' fundamentalist revolution.

== Party affiliation ==
Aryana described himself as being an Iranian nationalist and moderate socialist, not a monarchist. Although he received a great deal of support from monarchists who considered him to be a supporter. Aryana held dual membership of Aria Party and SUMKA.

He founded the Azadegan Organization, a nationalist opposition group which claimed to have had "developed a full command staff structure and support from all nationalist elements from the moderate left to the monarchists", while in exile in Paris.

Aryana combined his forces with not just Gholam Ali Oveissi but also Shapour Bakhtiar, Ahmad Madani and Ali Amini. Azadegan, meaning Born Free, was an anti-Khomeini movement which claimed as many as 12,000 followers in Iran, many of them in the armed forces. The daring seizing by Azadegan's officers of Tabarzin, an Iranian Navy La Combattante II type fast attack craft just built by France and en route to Iran while in the Mediterranean in August 1981, attracted media attention to Azadegan and its members' armed resistance against the clerical regime of Iran.

Military offices
Preceded by ?	Chief of Staff for the Tehran Depot Training Center; 1943	Succeeded by ?
Preceded by ?	Chief of the First Bureau; 1943–1945	Succeeded by ?
Preceded by ?	Deputy Head of the Officers' Academy; 1945–1948	Succeeded by ?
Preceded by ?	Commander of the Mahabad Brigade; 1948–1949	Succeeded by ?
Preceded by ?	Commander of the 1st Central Guards Infantry Division; 1949–1952	Vacant Dissolution of the division until its re-establishment in October 1953 Title next held by Reza Azimi
Preceded by Mohammadreza Shahandeh	Acting Chief of Staff of the Imperial Iranian Ground Forces; 1955–1957	Succeeded by ?
New title	Commander of the Imperial Iranian Ground Forces; 30 October 1955–11 February 1958	Succeeded by Abdol Hossein Hejazi
Preceded by ?	Commander of the Southern Forces; 1963–1964	Succeeded by ?
Preceded by Abdol Hossein Hejazi	Chief of the Joint Staff of the Imperial Iranian Armed Forces; 21 December 1965–4 May 1969	Succeeded by Fereydoun Djam
Diplomatic posts
Preceded by ?	Military attaché of Iran in France; 1952–1953	Succeeded by ?
