= Eskandar Firouz =

Iranian botanist (1926–2020)

- اسکندر فیروز
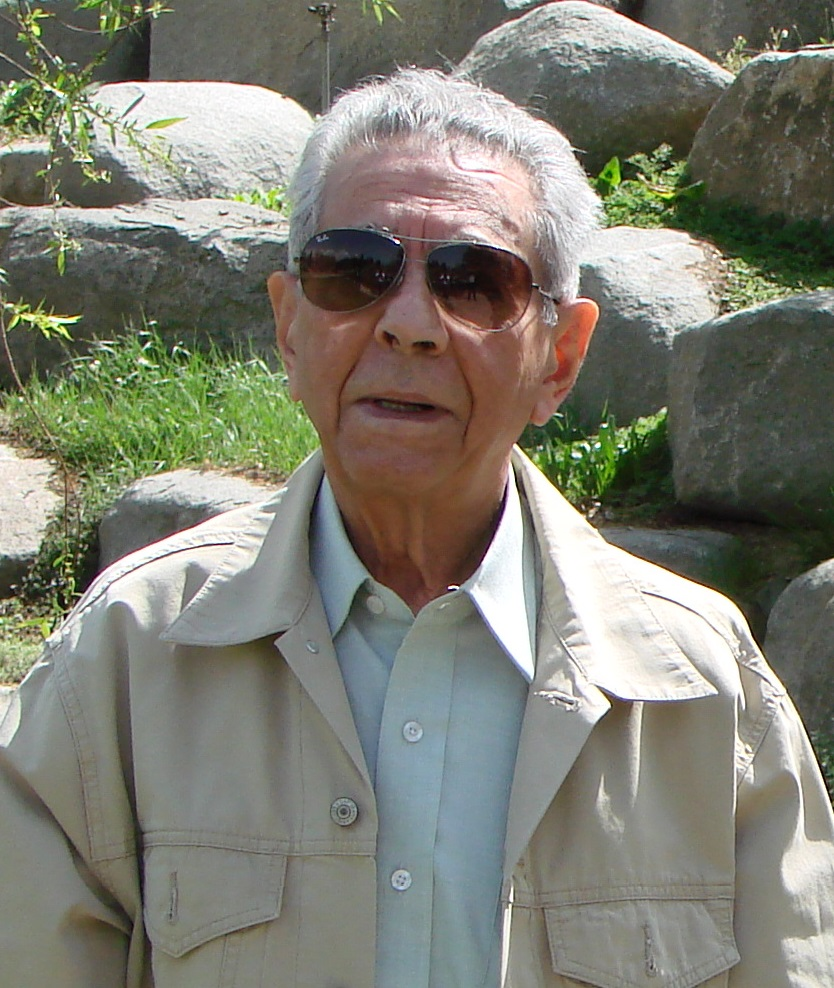
- Firouz in 2006

Deputy Prime Minister Head of Environment Organization
- In office 1972–1977
- Monarch: Mohammad Reza Pahlavi
- Prime Minister: Amir-Abbas Hoveyda
- Preceded by: Office established
- Succeeded by: Manouchehr Feyli

Personal details
- Born: 7 August 1926 Shiraz, Imperial State of Persia
- Died: 4 March 2020 (aged 93) Washington, D.C., United States
- Spouse: Iran Ala
- Children: 2
- Education: Yale University
- Occupation: Environmentalist

Eskandar Firouz (7 August 1926 – 4 March 2020) was an Iranian environmentalist and politician. He was the first director of the Department of Environment in Iran, where he developed the country's ecological conservation and management program.

== Early life ==
Firouz was born on 7 August 1926 in Shiraz to Mohammad Hossein Mirza Firouz, a Qajar prince. His paternal grandfather was Abdol-Hossein Farman Farma.

He was educated outside Iran, first in Germany, then in the United States at the Lawrenceville School, and later at Yale University.

== Career ==
In 1969, while serving as under-secretary of Iran's Ministry of Natural Resources, Firouz co-founded the Ramsar Convention on Wetlands with Geoffrey Matthews and Luc Hoffmann. Adopted in 1971, the convention is an international treaty that promotes the conservation and sustainable use of wetlands worldwide and is named after the coastal Iranian city of Ramsar, where it was signed.

Under Prime Minister Amir Abbas Hoveyda, Firouz worked to establish Iran's Department of Environment in 1971 and served as its first director. There, he played a key role in the creation of Iran's national parks, nature reserves, wildlife refuges, and other protected areas. He was appointed vice president of the United Nations Conference on the Human Environment in 1972 and served as a member of the presiding board of the International Union for the Conservation of Nature (IUCN) from 1973 to 1975. In 1977, he was elected president of the IUCN but never assumed the position following the resignation of Hoveyda's cabinet.

== Personal life and death ==
Firouz was married to Iran Ala, the daughter of Hossein Ala, Iran's prime minister from 1955 to 1957. They had two daughters, Anahita and Azar. Following the Islamic Revolution in 1979, he and his family moved to the Washington metropolitan area in the United States, where he died on 4 March 2020 at the age of 93.

== Notable works ==
- The Complete Fauna of Iran
- Environment Iran
- The wetlands and waterfowl of Iran
- Memoirs of Eskandar Firouz
