= 2021–22 Iranian national budget =

2021 Government budget of Iran for (1400 solar hijri)
- Submitted: 23 November 2020, 2 December 2020
- Submitted by: Ministry of Economic Affairs and Finance
- Passed: 24 November 2020
- Parliament: Islamic Consultative Assembly
- Website: https://www.mporg.ir/Portal/View/Page.aspx?PageId=0c912056-97f8-4378-bdb4-48239fbcb0dc

The 2021–22 (Iranian calendar year 1399) Iranian national budget was drafted while Iran was in an economic crisis of 2019–2021.

== Budget ==
The president Hassan Rouhani described the continued decline in oil budget as major achievements of the policies of economy of resistance in the 11th and 12th governments. The budget bill of fiscal 2021–22 had projected an export of 650,000 barrels per day (projected at $40 per barrel) of crude oil, according to the deputy head of Plan and Budget Organization of the Islamic Republic of Iran. A 25% rise in the salaries of government workers and pensioners has been included in the bill. 200 million euros is to be paid for Ukraine flight 752 victims families from Iranian National Development Fund.
