= Abbas Ali Khalatbari =

Iranian politician and jurist (1912–1979)

Abbas-Ali Khalatbari
- عباسعلی خلعتبری
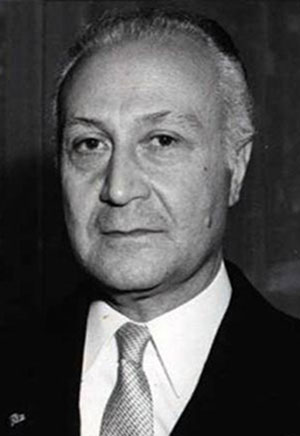

Minister of Foreign Affairs
- In office 13 September 1971 – 27 August 1978
- Monarch: Mohammad Reza Pahlavi
- Prime Minister: Amir-Abbas Hoveyda; Jamshid Amouzegar
- Preceded by: Ardeshir Zahedi
- Succeeded by: Amir Khosrow Afshar

General Secretary of CENTO
- In office June 1962 – January 1968
- Preceded by: Osman Ali Baig
- Succeeded by: Turgut Menemencioğlu

Personal details
- Born: 1912 Tehran, Persia
- Died: 11 April 1979 (aged 66–67) Tehran, Iran
- Cause of death: Execution
- Party: Rastakhiz Party (1975–1978)
- Children: 4
- Education: Faculty of Law and Economics of Paris

Abbas Ali Khalatbari (Persian: عباسعلی خلعتبری, romanized: Abbās-'Alī Khal’atbarī; 1912 – 11 April 1979), also known as Abbas Ali Khal'atbari, was an Iranian diplomat, who served as the minister of foreign affairs from 1971 to 1978. He was among the significant diplomats who shaped the foreign relations of Iran during the reign of Mohammad Reza Pahlavi. He is one of the Pahlavi era politicians who were executed following the Iranian Revolution.

== Early years and education ==
Khalatbari was born in 1912. He was a member of a well-established family.

Khalatbari pursued his education in Paris where he received a degree in political science from the Faculty of Law and Economics of Paris in 1936, and a PhD degree in law in 1938.

== Career ==
Khalatbari was a career diplomat. He began his career in the finance ministry in 1940 and then joined the foreign ministry in 1942. He briefly served as Iran's ambassador to Poland in 1961.

Khalatbari was appointed secretary general of CENTO in January 1962, replacing Mirza Osman Ali Baig in the post. Khalatbari was in office until January 1968 when Turgut Menemencioglu succeeded him in the post. From 1968 to 1970 he served as the deputy minister of foreign affairs.

Khalatbari was appointed foreign minister to the cabinet led by Prime Minister Amir Abbas Hoveyda on 13 September 1971, replacing Ardeshir Zahedi in the post. Khalatbari paid an official visit to Israel in 1977 as a guest of his Israeli counterpart Yigal Allon. Khalatbari was a member of the Commission on Musa Sadr established in 1977 to make a decision about the fate of Musa Al Sadr, a Lebanon-based influential Shia figure. The commission concluded that Al Sadr should be an agent for Iran.

Khalatbari was also appointed minister of foreign affairs to the cabinet formed by Jamshid Amouzegar on 7 August 1977. Khalatbari served in the post until 27 August 1978 when Amir Khosrow Afshar was named as the minister of foreign affairs. Although being loyal to the Shah, Khalatbari learned his removal from the early morning radio news.

== Later years and death ==
Following the Iranian Revolution in February 1979 Khalatbari was arrested and sentenced to death on the charges of corruption on earth; membership of the former regime, being a minister of the former government, being a SAVAK agent, being member of a government delegation acting against the interests of the nation; being employed by the CIA; treason, acting against the interest of the people, acting against the security of the nation". He was also charged with allowing the SAVAK agents to be employed as diplomats in different embassies of the Imperial Iran. He reportedly said that he had to do so.

Khalatbari and ten other officials of the Shah, including Mansour Rouhani, were executed by the security forces of the Islamic Republic of Iran in Tehran on 11 April 1979. Shortly before his execution, a written statement of Khalatbari's reports in the court was issued, claiming that the ousted Shah had "personally" killed many people.

== Personal life ==
Khalatbari was married to the sister of Safi Asfia, who headed the Plan Organisation of Iran, and was in charge of Iran's early nuclear ambitions. He had four children.

== Honors ==
Khalatbari was the recipient of Homayoun First Class and Taj Third Class honors.
