= Management and Planning Organization of Iran =

Iranian government body

Management and Planning Organization of Iran (MPO) is an organization of the Government of Iran. It was first established after the decision of President Mahmoud Ahmadinejad for terminating the Plan and Budget Organization (PBO) in 2007.

In July 2007, the MPO was dissolved after a direct order from President Mahmoud Ahmadinejad. Although the MPO was a state body whose head was appointed by the president, it was relatively independent organisation. President Ahmadinejad, however, established a new budget planning body directly under his control, a move that may give him a freer hand to implement populist policies blamed for driving up prices. Economist Fariborz Raiis-Dana said that the decision dealt the coup de grâce to the structure of the national management organization. Iranian MP Esmaeil Gramimoqaddam said that the president's directive is illegal and the parliament opposes his decision. "The president is not authorized to order an alteration or merger of an organization. This is the parliament's job", he added.

The Management and Planning Organization was revived under President Hassan Rouhani's government on November 10, 2014. It happened by the order of the President and with the approval of the Supreme Administrative Council, and by merger of the two Vice-Presidencies for Strategic Planning and Supervision, and Management and Human Capital Development.

== See also ==
- Economy of Iran
- Science and technology in Iran
- Environment of Iran
- Government of Iran
- Plan and Budget Organization (PBO)
