= Nasrollah Moghtader Mojdehi =

Iranian academic

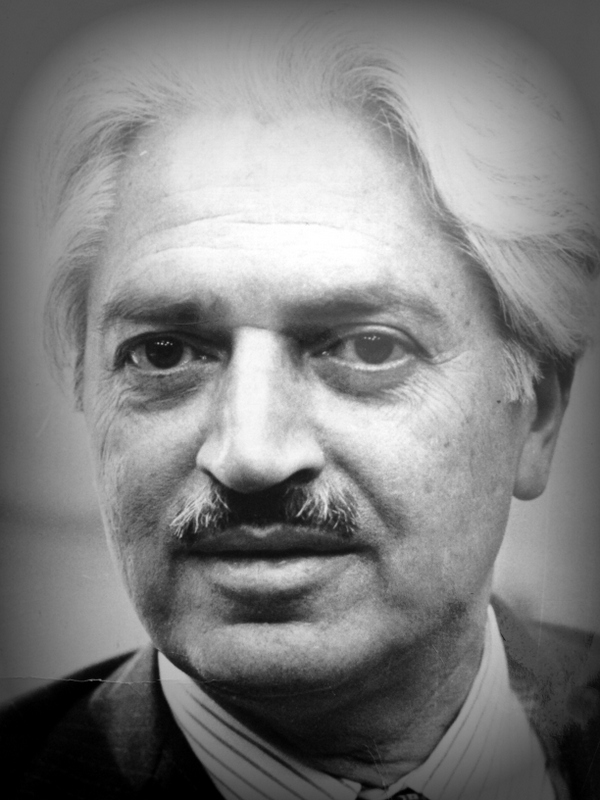
Nasrollah Moghtader Mojdehi in 1980

Nasrollah Moghtader Mojdehi (Persian: نصرالله مقتدر مژدهی; born April 3, 1921, in Rasht, Iran, died May 22, 2012, in London, England) was an influential Iranian academic, professor of internal medicine, and public servant, having served as a Senator in the pre-revolutionary Iranian Senate, and Minister of Health in the Amouzegar Cabinet and for a short period in the Sharif-Emami Cabinet.

Known by his peers and students as “Dr. Mojdehi”, his excellence, independence, and reform orientation and principled leadership, propelled him through the hierarchy of universities in Iran and ultimately resulted in his appointment as Iranian Minister of Health in 1978.

== Early life and education ==
Born into a privileged family, Mojdehi's father was a career civil servant and was Commander of Langarood and Ghazvin regions, among others. His mother was a large landowner.

Mojdehi graduated from high school and received his diploma with distinction from Shahpour High School in Rasht, Iran, in 1940.

From 1940 to 1946, he attended the Tehran University of Medical Sciences, where he distinguished himself and joined the faculty. He completed a post-doctoral program at the University of Edinburgh. He completed a fellowship program in 1966 at Johns Hopkins University School of Medicine, in Baltimore, Maryland.

== Career ==
After his return to Iran in 1966, he rejoined the faculty of Tehran University of Medical Sciences (Persian: دانشگاه علوم پزشکی تهران) as Professor of Internal Medicine with a specialty in Infectious Disease. A protégé of the late Dr. Manouchehr Eghbal, Dr. Mojdehi quickly rose through the ranks at the University, becoming a full Professor in 1967. In 1971, Dr. Mojdehi was tapped to become Dean of the Tehran University of Medical Sciences. From 1967 to 1969 Dr. Mojdehi served as Vice Chancellor of Tehran University under Chancellor Alikhani, where he distinguished himself by resolving a major protest at Pahlavi Hospital by para-medical personnel. In 1974, at the command of the Shah of Iran, Mohammad Rezā Shāh Pahlavī, and on the advice of Asadollah Alam, Minister of Court, Dr. Mojdehi assumed the role of Chancellor at University of Mashhad (Persian: دانشگاه فردوسی مشهد), the largest research university in Eastern Iran.

After two years in Mashad, in 1974 to 1976, Dr. Mojdehi returned to Tehran where he was elected to the Senate, representing Tehran in 1976.

== Views ==
During his tenure as Dean of the Tehran University of Medical Sciences, he instigated significant reforms to ensure that promotions were based upon merit rather than political connections, leading to the forced retirement of several ineffective, but politically influential professors. Mojdehi's reforms had the salutary effects of improving morale and bolstering the reputation of the medical school.

Mojdehi reluctantly left his position at Tehran University of Medical Sciences to assume leadership of Ferdowsi University at Mashhad. He promptly lifted the spirit of the Ferdowsi University community by again instituting reforms to ensure that faculty members were recognized based on merit rather than political connections and taking other affirmative steps to improve the faculty's morale.

While at Ferdowsi, during the ceremonial visits by the late Shah of Iran, Mojdehi refused to allow the military brass to lead the ceremonial processions. Proclaiming that teachers and professors were more important to the well being of the country than the military, Mojdehi informed the Governor of Khorassan Province that he would decline the invitation extended to University professors to participate in processions with the Shah, unless the University staff led the processions. At his insistence, University professors were promoted to the head of the receiving line in procession with the Shah, which sent a message that, while under his leadership, the University and its personnel decisions would not be either influenced or controlled by the government. During his tenure, Mojdehi also developed a professor exchange program between Georgetown University and Ferdowsi University. Mojdehi's declined to accept a gift by the Governor of Khorassan Province of a deed of valuable property, insisting that the property instead be given to the University, to be used in perpetuity as a residence by future Chancellors of the University during their time of service.

Consistent with his past principles and focus on instituting necessary reforms, his speeches on the Senate floor raised awareness of the need for progress in the areas of health and development, and he quickly gained a reputation as an advocate for liberalization and change. Given his reputation as a reformer and agent of positive change, in 1978, when controversy swirled around the existing cabinet appointee in the Ministry of Health, Dr. Sheikoleslami, Dr. Mojdehi was appointed Minister of Health in the Amouzegar Cabinet. He stayed on as Minister of Health in Sharif Emami's Cabinet. However, his tenure as minister was quickly overshadowed by the civil unrest that was developing in Iran. Interestingly, after his final personal meeting with the Shah in September 1978, he returned upset to a meeting with his deputies and pronounced that "the country is lost." Soon thereafter, he clashed with Monuchehr Azmoun, the deputy Prime Minister who sought to block Mojdehi's decision to appoint a Jewish physician as a deputy at the Ministry of Health. Unwilling to bend to the influence of Azmoun, Mojdehi unilaterally resigned as Minister of Health, without seeking the permission of the Shah. Unilateral resignations by cabinet ministers were unprecedented, and Mojdehi's public resignation based upon a matter of principle forever etched his reputation as a man of integrity and courage.

Following the revolution, due to his prior public service in the pre-revolutionary government, Mojdehi was imprisoned at Ghasre prison from May until August 1979. Mojdehi's well-known reputation for excellence in internal medicine and singular ability to diagnose difficult cases served as a means of his release. Over 120 physicians signed a petition addressed to the then leaders of the country asking for his release, given his service to the country. In addition, as fate would have it, a senior and highly influential cleric fell ill and the cause of his illness could not be determined. In search for a cure, the senior cleric identified Mojdehi as the best physician to diagnose the cleric's illness. Later, the grateful cleric was instrumental in securing the release of Mojdehi after six months of imprisonment.

== Publications ==
- Mojdehi NM. Infectious Diseases. Tehran, Iran 1951.
- Mojdehi NM. Infectious Diseases Vol. 1-2. Tehran, Iran 1968.
- Mojdehi N, Moin, M. Tropical Eosinophylia. Acta Medica Iranica. 1957; 1(4): 259-265.
- Azizi SP, Mojdehi N. Contribution A L’etude D’endocardite Brucellaire en Iran. Acta Medica Iranica. 1959; 3(1): 1-5.
- Mojdehi N, Moine M, Study of 72 Cases of Human Brucellosis in Tehran. Acta Medica Iranica. 1962; 5(1-4): 34-41.
- Mojdehi N, Moine M. Treatment of Hepatic Coma by Exchange Transfusion: A Report of Three Cases. 1967; X(3-4): 71-78.
- Barzgar MA, Mojdehi NM, Amini F. A Clinical Study of the Use of Pyrvinium Pamoate with Piperazine (Vanpar ®) in the Treatment of Oxyuriasis and Ascariasis. 1974; 3(1): 62-66.
