= Safi Asfia =

Iranian engineer and politician (1916–2008)

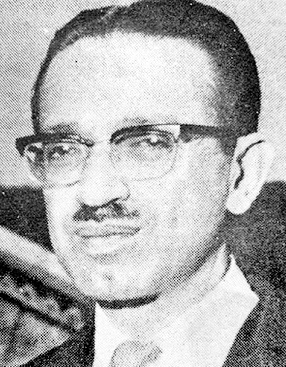

Personal details
- Born: Mohammad Ali Safi Asfia; 1916 Tehran, Qajar Iran
- Died: 11 April 2008 (aged 91–92) Tehran, Iran
- Children: 3
- Education: Ecole Polytechnique; Mines Paris - PSL

Safi Asfia (Persian: محمدعلی صفی اصفیاء; 1916–2008) was an Iranian mining engineer, technocrat and politician who held several cabinet posts during the reign of Shah Mohammad Reza Pahlavi. He was arrested in 1979 in the Iranian revolution and was imprisoned until 1984. Following his release Asfia did not leave Iran and was involved in computer programming.

== Early life and education ==
Asfia was born in Tehran in 1916. Following his graduation from high school he was sent by the state to France for higher education in 1932. He attended Ecole Polytechnique in 1934 and Ecole des Mines de Paris in 1936.

== Career ==
Following his graduation Asfia joined the University of Tehran where he taught mathematics and geology. At age 23 he was promoted to the professorship. In 1955 he began to work as an adviser at the Planning Organization and became its director in 1961. When he was in office he extensively dealt with the Iran's early nuclear program.

Asfia was appointed deputy prime minister in July 1962 to the first cabinet of Asadollah Alam. Asfia was appointed to the same post in 1966. He also served as the director of Planning Organization until 1969 when he was replaced by Mehdi Samii in the post.

Asfia was named as the minister of state for economic and development affairs to the cabinet formed by Jamshid Amouzegar on 7 August 1977. Asfia continued to serve in different cabinet posts until 1979 when the Shah was removed from power. He also served as a board member of the royal organization of social welfare headed by Ashraf Pahlavi.

== Later years ==
Asfia was arrested during the regime change in 1979 and was imprisoned for five years. He began to deal with computer programming after he was freed and joined the Zirakzadeh Science Foundation as one of its board members. The foundation was established by Ahmad Zirakzadeh, one of his polytechnic fellows, and dealt with the creation of science centers for children and youngsters. He developed a computer software used for the calculations of the astronomical objects which was designed for astronomers.

== Personal life and death ==
Asfia was married and had three daughters. His wife died in October 2007. Their eldest daughter died in 2001. As of 2008 one of his daughters was living in Tehran and the other one in Paris. He died in Tehran on 11 April 2008.

== Awards ==
Asfia was the recipient of the following French awards: Legion of Honour (rank of Commander) and of the Ordre national du Mérite (Grand Cross).
