= 2022–23 Iranian national budget =

Iranian FY2022 National budget had increased tax, boost for space budget, budget was increased for Sepah Pasdaran as well.

Oil was set to be predicted 60$ per barrel in the budget.

== increase ==
National information network
