= Amir Khosrow Afshar =

Iranian politician (1919–1999)

Amir-Khosrow Afshar
- امیرخسرو افشار
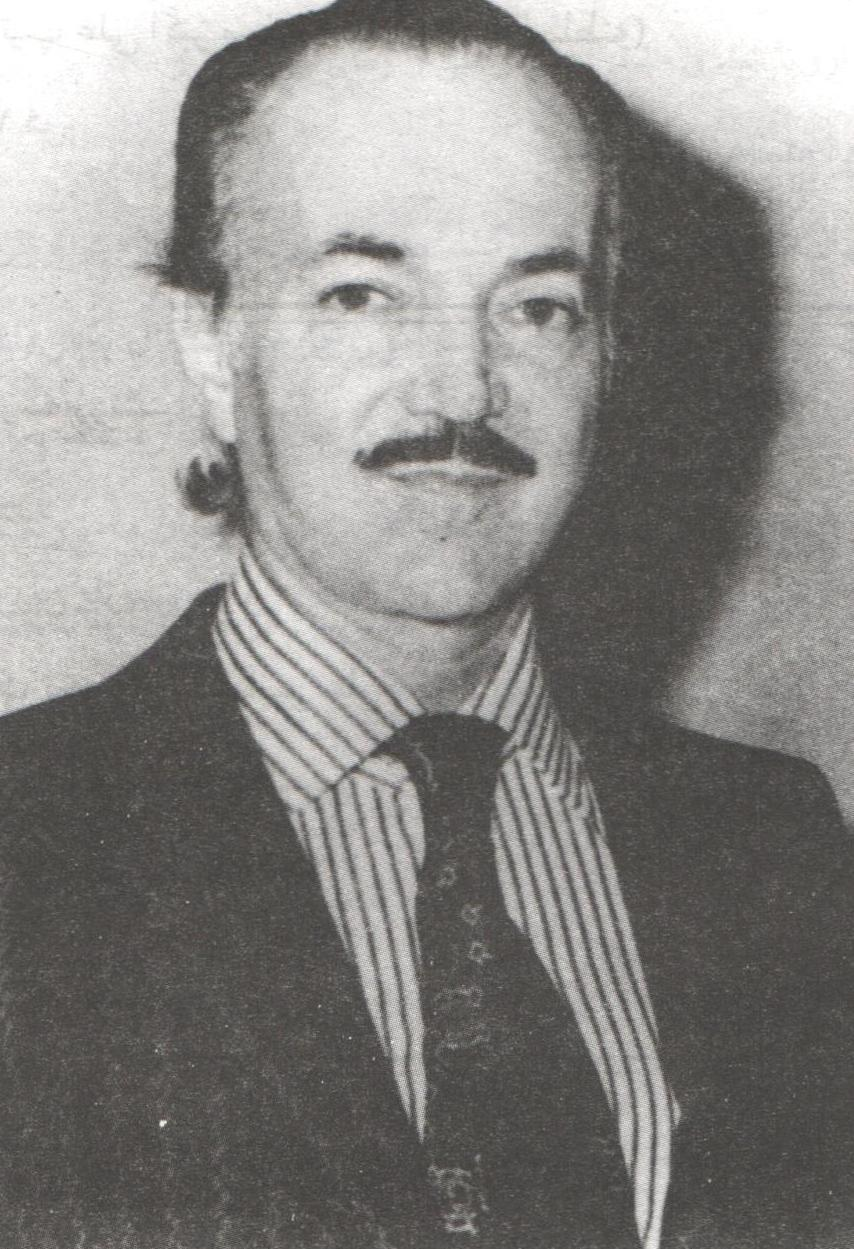

Minister of Foreign Affairs
- In office 27 August 1978 – 5 January 1979
- Monarch: Mohammad Reza Pahlavi
- Prime Minister: Jaafar Sharif Emami; Gholam Reza Azhari
- Preceded by: Abbas Ali Khalatbari
- Succeeded by: Ahmad Mirfendereski

Personal details
- Born: 1919 Tehran, Qajar Iran
- Died: 1999 (aged 79–80)

Amir-Khosrow Afshar Qasemlou (1919–1999; Persian: امیرخسرو افشار قاسملو) was an Iranian diplomat who served as the minister of foreign affairs of the Imperial State of Iran during the Pahlavi era from 1978 to 1979.

== Biography ==
Born in 1919 in Tehran, Afshar was a career diplomat. At the beginning of the 1950s, he was the political joint secretary at the foreign ministry. He later assumed the posts of the permanent secretary at the Ministry of Foreign Affairs and deputy foreign minister. In 1960, he was the acting minister of foreign affairs.

While serving as the deputy to Ardeshir Zahedi, Iranian foreign minister, Afshar was named as the chief Iranian negotiator on the Bahrain question in 1968. Next, he was appointed ambassador of Iran to the Court of St James's on 6 November 1969, succeeding Abbas Aram in the post. He held this position until December 1974 when he was replaced by Mohammad Reza Amir Teymour in the post.

Afshar also served as the ambassador of Iran to West Germany and to France. He was appointed foreign minister to the cabinet led by Jafar Sharif-Emami on 27 August 1978, replacing Abbas Ali Khalatbari in the post. He retained the post when a military government led by Gholam Reza Azhari was formed on 6 November 1978. His term ended in January 1979, and Ahmad Mirfendereski replaced him in the post.

In the 1960s Afshar was among the Iranian statesmen who favoured Iran's close relations with the U.S. and other Western countries in order to secure the survival of the Pahlavi dynasty. He left Iran before the revolution in 1979 and died in 1999.

== Honors ==
Afshar was the recipient of Honorary Knight Commander of the Most Distinguished Order of St Michael and St George and a Grand Officer of the Order of Orange-Nassau.
