= IRIS Tabarzin =

Islamic Republic of Iran Navy battle ship

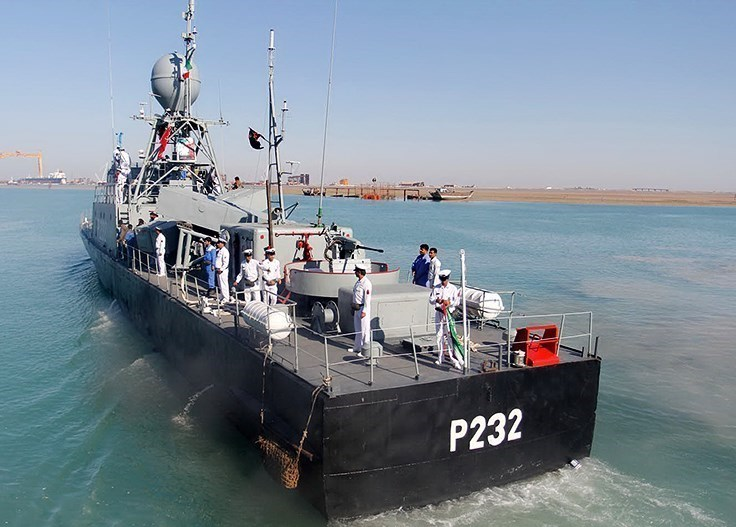
- IRIS Tabrzin (P323) in 2019

History

Iran
- Name: Tabarzin
- Namesake: Tabarzin
- Operator: Islamic Republic of Iran Navy
- Ordered: 14 October 1974
- Builder: Constructions de Mécaniques, Cherbourg
- Laid down: 24 June 1977
- Launched: 15 September 1978
- Commissioned: 1 August 1981
- Refit: 2011–2013
- Status: In service

General characteristics (as built)
- Class & type: Kaman-class fast attack craft
- Displacement: 249 tons standard; 275 tons full load
- Length: 47 m (154 ft 2 in)
- Beam: 7.1 m (23 ft 4 in)
- Draft: 1.9 m (6 ft 3 in)
- Installed power: 4 × MTU 16V538 TB91 diesels, 14,400 brake horsepower (10.7 MW)
- Propulsion: 4 × shafts
- Speed: 36 knots (67 km/h)
- Range: 2,000 miles (3,200 km) at 15 knots (28 km/h); 700 miles (1,100 km) at 33.7 knots (62.4 km/h)
- Complement: 30
- Armament: 4 × Harpoon (single cell); 1 × 76mm/65 (single compact); 1 × 40mm/70 Bofors gun
- Notes: As reported by Jane's (1979)

General characteristics (reported after refit)
- Sensors & processing systems: Surface search/fire control: Signaal WM28; I/J-band; Navigarion: Recal Decca 1226; I-band; IFF: UPZ-27N/APX-72.
- Electronic warfare & decoys: ESM: Thomson-CSF TMV 433 Dalia; radar intercept; ECM: Thomson-CSF Alligator; jammer
- Armament: Preemptively: 2 or 4 AShM launchers with Noor or Qader (1 or 2 twin); Preemptively: 40mm gun replaced by a 20mm or a 23mm gun; 1 × OTO Melara 3 in (76mm)/62 compact; 2 × 12.7mm machine guns
- Notes: As reported by Jane's (2015)

IRIS Tabarzin (Persian: تبرزین, lit. 'Battleaxe') is a Kaman-class fast attack craft serving in the Southern Fleet of the Islamic Republic of Iran Navy.

== History ==
=== Hijack ===
Tabarzin was hijacked on her maiden voyage from Cherbourg to Iran, when on 13 August 1981, approximately 15 commandos under guise of tourists aboard the rented tugboat Salazon raided the ship on territorial waters of Spain. The Azadegan Organization claimed responsibility for the takeover, stating that they have seized the ship "without a shot" and will use it as a "fighting unit" against the Iranian government. Following the event, the Iranian foreign ministry started diplomatic efforts to return the ship and released a statement, accusing the United States government of being responsible for the attack:

It is clear that the CIA has had a hand in the operation. The head of the pirates was a freedom fighter by the name of Habibollahi in whose escape from Iran the Secretary of State in Carter's administration, Cyrus Vance, was personally involved...

On 18 August 1981, she harbored at the port of Casablanca, Morocco for a refuel and garnering food and water, after they "forced harbor authorities", according to The Christian Science Monitor report. The next day, the hijackers handed over Tabarzin to the French in Toulon, in exchange for permission to stay in France for a group's leader and 25 of his followers.

=== Refit ===
On 1 December 2013, Tabarzin was put into service again after an overhaul that took 30 months. Iranian media reported that in February 2019, she took part in the naval wargame Velayat 97, firing two Qader and Qadir cruise missiles at the targets.

== See also ==
- List of current ships of the Islamic Republic of Iran Navy
- List of military equipment manufactured in Iran
