= 2024–25 Iranian national budget =

The Iranian government budget for the financial year 2024–2025 was prepared in November 2023. It marks the first budget under the Seventh Five-Year Development Plan, with total expenditures estimated at 2,462,000 billion tomans. The budget for oil revenues was reduced by 6%. Overall, the budget reflects a high deficit.

Military spending by the Islamic Republic received an increase of approximately $5 billion annually, financed through oil exports. The budget also includes a 35% increase in the prices of natural gas, electricity, and water. The budget allocation for the Islamic Republic of Iran Broadcasting (IRIB) increased by 43%.

Value-added tax (VAT) and personal income taxes were raised, with a 10% increase for minimum wage earners and up to 50% for higher-income groups. Additional taxes were introduced on wealth, vehicle ownership, and housing. Salaries for government employees were increased by 18% to 20%, with the maximum monthly salary capped at 65 million tomans.

Toll rates for roads were also increased. The National Development Fund received a 40% reduction in its budget allocation.

Subsidies for pharmaceuticals and bread will be funded through oil revenues and VAT income. Families with three or more children are eligible for a 15% tax rebate.

Following the death of the president and the 2024 presidential election, the new administration approved an additional 400 billion tomans for the Arba'een mourning ceremonies in Iraq.

== Military ==
Army and Islamic Revolutionary Guard Corps (IRGC) veterans and their families received additional tax cuts and exemptions.

== Retirement ==
The retirement age was increased from approximately 30 to around 40 years of service in an effort to address the imbalance in the pension fund. The government owes an estimated 550,000 billion tomans in debt to the Social Security Organization.

== Banking ==
The government announced restrictions on the amount of money that can be transferred to non-business accounts.

== Trade ==
Tariffs on imported baby formula were reduced.
