= Behrouz Vahidi Azar =

Behrouz Vahidi Azar (Persian: بهروز وحیدی آذر), born 1952 in Tabriz, is an Iranian violin teacher at the Islamic Republic of Iran Broadcasting music school.

== Career ==
Once in a couple of years, with the financial aid of the parents, he gathers his students into a chamber orchestra and conducts them.

== Cultural Concerns ==
Vahidi Azar has never hesitated to express his concerns to the authorities over the senseless, haphazard importing of the guitar and electric keyboard by self-seeking profiteers. He holds that the two instruments "disrupt children's emotional development", "jeopardize their mental health" and "are not celebrated as much in the manufacturing countries". He is also concerned about "the growth of pub music", "the attraction of music graduates to pubs" and "directorship of orchestras by unqualified people with a background in pubs".
