= Cyrus Amouzgar =

Iranian politician (1934–2021)

Minister of Information and Tourism (acting)
- In office 5 January 1979 – 11 February 1979
- Monarch: Mohammad Reza Pahlavi
- Prime Minister: Shapour Bakhtiar
- Preceded by: Abolhassan Sa'adatmand
- Succeeded by: position abolished

Personal details
- Born: April 10, 1934 Babol, Imperial State of Iran
- Died: November 2, 2021 (aged 87) Paris, France
- Party: National Front

Cyrus Amouzgar (Persian: سیروس آموزگار; 1934 – 2 November 2021) was an Iranian journalist, author, and politician. He served as acting Minister of Information and Tourism, which oversaw the national radio and television broadcaster, and press outlets, from late 1978 to 11 February 1979, in the cabinet of Prime Minister Shapour Bakhtiar.
