= Plan and Budget Organization (Iran) =

Governmental department of the Government of Iran

Plan and Budget Organization of the Islamic Republic of Iran
- سازمان برنامه و بودجه کشور

Agency overview
- Formed: 1948
- Preceding agency: Management and Planning Organization of Iran (MPO)
- Jurisdiction: Islamic Republic of Iran
- Headquarters: Tehran, Iran
- Agency executive: Hamid Pourmohammadi
- Website: www.mporg.ir

Plan and Budget Organization of the Islamic Republic of Iran (abbreviated as PBO) (Persian: سازمان برنامه و بودجه کشور) is a governmental department of the Government of Iran. It is administered and funded by the Presidency of I.R. Iran. The Plan and Budget Organization (PBO), formerly known as the Management and Planning Organization (MPO), is one of the largest governmental establishments in Iran. From 1948 until 2007 and again since 2014, it is fully responsible for preparing the country's budget. Statistical Center of Iran. was a part of PBO.

The PBO has a variety of goals and duties, including the evaluation of the country's resources, the preparation of its medium and long term development plans and policies, the preparation of annual budgets, and the monitoring and evaluation of work done under the implemented plans.

In accordance with the third five-year development plan, the “entrepreneurship development plan in Iranian universities”, (known as KARAD Plan) was developed, and launched in twelve universities across the country, under the supervision of the Management and Planning Organization and the Ministry of Science, Research and Technology.

== Budget accounts ==
- 2024–25 Iranian national budget
- 2022–23 Iranian national budget
- 2021–22 Iranian national budget

== History ==
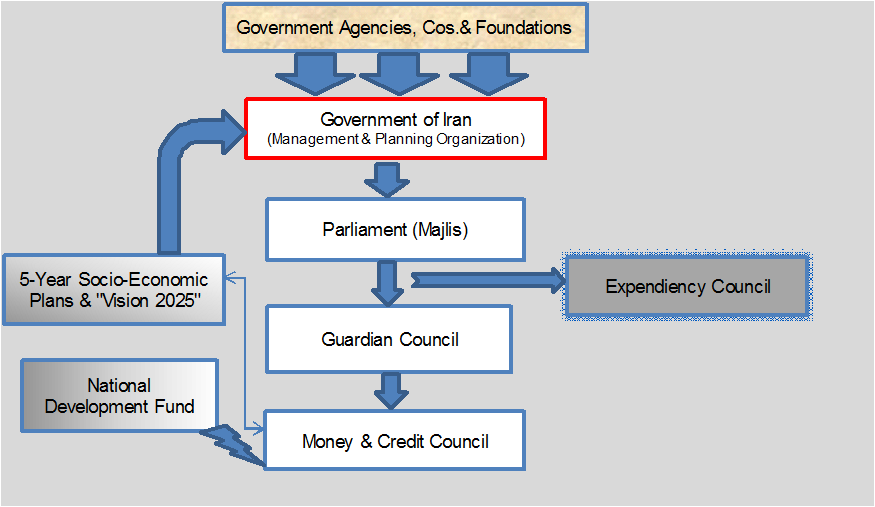
Iranian budget process

SCI was established in 1948. It has been working as a government organization and also as a deputy of the presidency in last decades.

In 2007, Management and Planning Organization of Iran (MPO) was established after the decision of President Mahmoud Ahmadinejad for terminating the Plan and Budget Organization (PBO) and few years later was replaced with PBO.

== Affiliated organizations ==
- Statistical Center of Iran
- National Cartographic Center of Iran
- Subsidy Reform Organization
- Center for Development Research and future studies

== Functions ==
Recent studies conducted by Iran's State Inspectorate Organization (SIO) suggest that in addition to the delays and slow progress of many development projects in Iran, their costs were much higher than the estimates envisaged in preliminary agreements. The organization noted that although the blame should partially be placed on relevant executive bodies, the main responsibility lies with the erstwhile management and planning organization. After election of Hassan Rouhani as President, Management and Planning Organization was restored in November 2014 and Mohammad Bagher Nobakht was appointed as its head. In 2016, the MPO was re-titled as the Plan and Budget Organization (PBO).

== See also ==
- Management and Planning Organization of Iran (MPO)
- Statistical Center of Iran
- Economy of Iran
- Government of Iran
