= Manouchehr Azmoun =

Iranian politician

Minister of State in charge of Parliament
- In office 27 August 1978 – 29 October 1978
- Prime Minister: Jafar Sharif-Emami

Governor of Fars Province
- In office 7 August 1977 – 27 August 1978
- Prime Minister: Jamshid Amouzegar

Minister of Labour and Social Affairs
- In office 1 September 1973 – 7 August 1977
- Prime Minister: Amir-Abbas Hoveida

Personal details
- Born: 29 September 1930
- Died: 9 April 1979 (aged 48) Qasr Prison, Iran
- Cause of death: Execution by Firing Squad
- Party: Rastakhiz Party
- Education: University of Cologne

Manouchehr Azmoun (September 29, 1930 – April 9, 1979) was a member of the 24th National Assembly, Minister of Labor and Social Affairs in Amir-Abbas Hoveyda Cabinet, Governor of Fars in the cabinet of Jamshid Amouzegar and then Minister of State in the Cabinet of Jafar Sharif Emami. He was executed on 9 April 1979. He held a PhD in Political Economy and Social Sciences from the University of Cologne, Germany.

== Arrest and execution ==
Azmoun was arrest on 7 November 1978 by the Shah order and he remain in Prison until 11 February 1979 when Bakhtiar resigned he was arrest again on 13 February 1979 by Khomeini order. he was charge in Corruption of the god he was executed on 9 April 1979 in Qasr Prison with Air Forces Chief, Amir Hossein Rabii, IV Department of Army director, Ali Mohammad Khajeh Nouri and policeman
