= Iraj Vahidi =

Iranian engineer and politician (1927–2022)

Personal details
- Born: 1927 Khorramshahr, Pahlavi Iran
- Died: August 2022 (aged 94–95)
- Party: Iran Novin Party
- Education: University of Tehran; University of Durham

Iraj Vahidi (Persian: ایرج وحیدی; 1927–2022) was an Iranian engineer and politician who held several cabinet positions in the 1970s. He served as the minister of agriculture between 1969 and 1971 and then as the minister of energy and water between 1971 and 1976.

== Early life and education ==
Vahidi was born in Khorramshahr in 1927. He graduated from the University of Tehran obtaining a degree in civil engineering. In 1959 he received a PhD in water and water waste engineering from the University of Durham.

== Career and activities ==
Following his graduation Vahidi started his career at the National Iranian Oil Company (NIOC). Next he was employed as an inspector at the Ministry of Agriculture. He became the head of the irrigation department at the same ministry. He was named as the deputy minister of water and electricity in 1963. He served as the director of the Water and Electricity Organization in the Khuzestan province from 1966 to 1969. He also held other public posts, including membership at the NIOC steering committee. He joined the Iran Novin Party, ruling party of the Pahlavi rule.

In 1969 Vahidi was appointed minister of agriculture which he held until 1971 when he was named as the minister of energy and water. On 1 April 1974 in a cabinet reshuffle he was appointed minister of energy which was reorganized to assume the oil-related policies. While serving as minister of energy he was named as the president of the OPEC in April 1974.

As of February 1976 Vahidi was serving as the minister of oil in the cabinet led by Prime Minister Amir-Abbas Hoveyda. He remained in office until February 1977 when he was removed from the post due to continuous power shortages in the country.

Following his removal Vahidi joined the Princess Ashraf Pahlavi Foundation and was its managing director. He was among the contributors of Bonyad magazine, a cultural and political monthly launched by the foundation in 1977.

=== Arrest ===
Vahidi and 34 other Iranian politicians who had served in various ministerial posts were arrested by the Iranian forces in November 1978. They were detained due their alleged involvement in illegal activities and misuse of power.

== Personal life and death ==
Vahidi was married and had two daughters. A 1974 report by the Central Intelligence Agency described him as a skilled and praised administrator and technician with an expertise on water resources and related agricultural matters. He died in August 2022.
