= Hassan Shalchian =

Iranian politician (1910–2000)

Minister of Roads and Transportation
- In office 27 August 1978 – 31 December 1978
- Prime Minister: Jafar Sharif-Emami; Gholam-Reza Azhari
- In office 26 January 1965 – 1 September 1973
- Prime Minister: Amir Abbas Hoveida
- Succeeded by: Javad Shahrestani

Personal details
- Born: 11 July 1911 Tehran, Qajar Iran
- Died: 7 March 2001 (aged 89) Tehran, Iran
- Party: Nonpartisanism

Hassan Shalchian (Persian: حسن شالچیان; 1910 in Tehran – 2000 in Tehran) was an Iranian politician, who served as the Minister of Roads and Transportation from 22 November 1978 to 31 December 1978.
