= Manouchehr Ganji =

Iranian politician

Minister of Education
- In office 2 January 1976 – 5 November 1978
- Preceded by: Ahmad Houshang Sharifi
- Succeeded by: Kamal Habibollahi

Personal details
- Born: 1931 (age 94–95) Tehran, Imperial State of Iran
- Education: Cambridge University; University of Kentucky; Graduate Institute of International Studies

Manouchehr Ganji (Persian: منوچهر گنجی; born 1931) is a human rights activist and a former Minister of Education of Iran from 1976 until 1979.

== Life ==
Ganji was born in Tehran, Iran. He received his B.A. and M.A. degrees in political science and international relations from the University of Kentucky, his doctorate degree in international law — international protection of human rights — from the Graduate Institute of International Studies, University of Geneva, which then dedicated to him a place in its Hall of Inspiring Stories, and his post doctorate degree from the University of Cambridge.

Ganji was the Minister of Education of Iran between the years 1976 and 1978. He served as professor of international law and international organizations at Tehran University from 1966 to 1979. He was the founder and the first director of the university's Center for Graduate International Studies (1966–1971). He served as the dean of Faculty of Law and Political Science of Tehran University (1971–1974) and he acted as the advisor to the prime minister of Iran, Amir Abbas Hoveida, between 1974 and 1976. Ganji was also the founder of the Iranian Committee for Human Rights, 1967, and its first secretary-general, 1967–1970. He has written 27 books in Persian, English and French and many articles on the topics of international protection of human rights, civil disobedience and international law.

== Human rights activities ==
Ganji has been a human rights activist since his student days in the US, in the 1950s. The subject of his master's degree thesis was the United Nations and human rights, and his PhD dissertation was entitled "International Protection of Human Rights".

Between 1961 and 1962, he served on the secretariat of the International Labour Organization and the division on the Application of the ILO Conventions and Recommendations (in Geneva). From 1962 to 1965, he worked for the UN Division of Human Rights at the UN Headquarters in New York.

During the reign of Mohammad Reza Pahlavi, Ganji convinced the Shah to invite the International Committee of Red Cross to open up permanent offices in Iran, to visit and inspect Iranian prisons and guarantee that no torture was taking place there. The ICRC offices remained open and active until after the Iranian Revolution, when the ruling clerics closed them down in 1980. Since the Iranian Revolution, Ganji has been active in bringing violations of human rights in Iran by the ruling clerics to the world's attention.

Ganji was the first Special Rapporteur for the United Nations Commission on Human Rights on the question of apartheid and racial discrimination in southern Africa, including South Africa, South West Africa (now known as Namibia) and Southern Rhodesia (now known as Zimbabwe), during 1967–1969.

Between 1969 and 1973, Ganji served as the U.N. Special Rapporteur in charge of the preparation of a comprehensive study on conditions of economic, social and cultural rights in all member countries of the United Nations. The U.N. published this global study in 1974 in all its official languages. In 1973 and 1976, Ganji was elected by the UN Commission on Human Rights to serve, in his personal capacity, as a member of the UN Sub-Commission on Prevention of Discrimination and Protection of Minorities (each time for a 3-year term). In 1976, he was also elected by the Conference of States Parties to the United Nations Covenant on Civil and Political Rights, to serve a three-year term in his personal capacity as a member of the Committee on Human Rights, responsible for overseeing the implementation of the covenant.

To save his life, Ganji hid in Iran and six months after the 1979 revolution escaped on foot into Turkey and from there to the United States. Ganji is the founder and secretary general of the 'Derafsh Kaviani' (the Flag of Freedom Organization of Iran "FFO"), a democratic non-violent opposition movement to the clerical regime. He is also founder and secretary general of the Organization for Human Rights and Fundamental Freedoms for Iran whose aims and purposes are educating the Iranian people about their rights and freedoms, demanding their respect by the authorities, and through civil disobedience striving towards the establishment of a free and pluralistic society respectful of human rights, the rule of non-discrimination, separation of church and state and a parliamentary democracy in Iran.

Through the Flag of Freedom Organization of Iran and the Organization for Human Rights and Fundamental Freedoms for Iran, Ganji has been a leading advocate for freedom and human rights in Iran and has orchestrated a campaign of political defiance by advocating civil disobedience against the clerical regime in Iran since the revolution.

During the past 30 years, seven attempts have been made against Ganji's life. Seven of his closest colleagues were assassinated in Europe and the Middle East by the agents of the clerical regime. Many others are said to have been imprisoned, tortured and killed in Iran.

Ganji is the author of many books and articles in Persian, English, and French. In addition to his 5 volumes of the United Nations Reports; these include university textbooks on international law and international organizations (four volumes in Persian), international protection of human rights, apartheid and racial discrimination in southern Africa, Etre Persan (a personal political memoir in French), a study of the developments of the past fifty years in Iran written in Persian, entitled Atash-e Nahofteh (The Hidden Fire), and Defying the Iranian Revolution: From a Minister to the Shah to a Leader of Resistance.
