= Mohammad-Reza Amin =

Iranian academic

Mohammad Reza Amin (c.1927 – 27 September 2003) was an Iranian academic who was Chancellor of Sharif University of Technology from 1968 to 1972. Amin was also President of the National Iranian Steel Industries.

Amin was a graduate of the University of California Berkeley, receiving a doctorate in physics.

In 1978 he served as Minister of Industries and Mines at the Cabinet of Jafar Sharif-Emami. In 1979, Amin joined the World Bank. He worked as division chief of the World Bank's technical department for the Europe, Middle East and North Africa region.

Amin emigrated to the United States in 1979. He died of cancer in Alexandria, Virginia, on 27 September 2003, aged 76.

Academic offices
| Preceded by Fazlollah Reza | Chancellor of Sharif University of Technology; 1968–1972 | Succeeded by Hossein Nasr |
