= Akbar Etemad =

Former Iranian deputy prime minister (1930–2025)

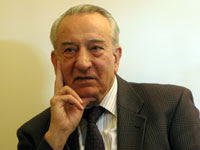
- Born: 3 February 1930; Hamadan, Persia
- Died: 11 April 2025 (aged 95); Paris, France
- Education: EPFL
- Occupation: Nuclear energy consultant
- Known for: President of Atomic Energy Organisation of Iran

Akbar Etemad (Persian: اکبر اعتماد; 3 February 1930 – 11 April 2025) was the president of the Atomic Energy Organisation of Iran from 1974 to 1978. He was popularly called the father of Iran's nuclear program.

After the 1979 Iranian Revolution, he left Iran and established office in Paris and worked there as a nuclear energy consultant. As of 2009, he was the co-chair of Iranians for Peace. He died in Paris on 11 April 2025, whilst undergoing treatment at the Léopold-Bellan Hospital. He was 95.

== Early life and career ==
Etemad was born on 3 February 1930, in Hamadan. He got a diploma in electrical engineering from EPFL in 1957. He received an M.Sc. in 1958 from INSTN and a Ph.D. in reactor physics from EPFL in 1963. He worked for Brown-Boveri (Brown, Boveri & Cie.) in Switzerland as a research engineer for one and a half years. He also worked for the Swiss Federal Institute for Reactor Research as the chief of its nuclear shielding group for five and a half years. He returned to Iran in 1965. In 1968 he joined the Ministry of Science and Higher Education of Iran as Deputy minister for research. In 1973 he was appointed chancellor of the French language Bu Ali Sina University. In a meeting with the Prime Minister of Iran Amir Abbas Hoveida, Etemad proposed that an independent national organization for scientific research needed to be established. Hoveida approved the proposal and Etemad was made the head of Iran's Institute for Planning and Research in Science. On April 10, 1974, he was appointed Deputy Prime Minister of Iran and the first president of its atomic energy organization. After becoming the president he ensured that all decision-making powers were given to him, right from the budget to the selection of staff. The AEOI did not have to report its expenditure to the government instead a single report was submitted to the treasury at the end of every year.

The Shah had set the target of producing 23,000 Megawatts of electrical energy from nuclear sources within the next twenty years. In July 1974, a nuclear deal worth US$130 million was signed between Iran and United States. He had once asked the Shah if he wanted to build a nuclear bomb, to which the Shah replied that doing so would only isolate Iran from the rest of the world. In October 1975, he refused that Iran had signed a uranium deal worth US$7 million with South Africa. After he was accused of mismanagement and embezzlement in October 1978, he resigned from the post of the president of the Atomic Energy Organization. After the 1979 Iranian revolution that led to the formation of a new government however, Etemad left Iran for Paris. The new leaders asked him to return but he refused. During the Gulf War, Saddam Hussein attempted to persuade him to work for Iraq but he refused saying "'as long as you are fighting my people I wouldn't come to Iraq. You are my enemy".

== Interview by Maziar Bahari ==
In September 2008, the transcript of his interview conducted by Maziar Bahari was published in the New Statesman entitled "The Shah's plan was to build bombs." Maziar Bahari wrote that Etemad had confided in him that the Mohammad Reza Pahlavi, the Shah of Iran intended to make nuclear weapons with Iran's civilian nuclear program.

After the interview was published, Mr. Etemad wrote a letter to the New Statesman which appeared in the print edition of the 1 December 2008 issue of the magazine, in which he vociferously denied the claim attributed to him by Maziar Bahari:

The title "The Shah's plan was to build bombs" is misleading. I told Mr Bahari that I had to know what the Shah had in mind regarding the nature of the nuclear programme. I also said that during a long discussion, the Shah told me that Iran did not need nuclear weapons, because our strong conventional forces would guarantee our security and national interests.

== See also ==
- Atomic Energy Organization of Iran

== Bibliography ==
- Patrikarakos, David (13 November 2012). Nuclear Iran: The Birth of an Atomic State. I. B. Tauris. ISBN 9781780761251.
