= Pan-Iranist parliamentary group =

Iranian parliamentary group (1967–1979)

- Chamber: Iranian Parliament
- Legislature(s): 22nd, 24th
- Foundation: 1967; 58 years ago
- Dissolution: 1979; 46 years ago
- Member parties: Pan-Iranist Party
- President: Mohsen Pezeshkpour

The Pan-Iranist parliamentary group (Persian: گروه پارلمانی پان‌ایرانیست) was caucus of the Pan-Iranist Party in the National Consultative Assembly.

== History ==
The group was reactivated when it split from the Resurgence Party's majority fraction, and was officially revived on 19 June 1978 with four members.

=== Seats ===
Years	Seats	Change	Ref
1967–1971	5 / 219 (2%)	Steady	
1971–1978	0 / 268 (0%)	▼5	
1978–1979	4 / 268 (1%)	▲4	

=== Members ===
#	Name	Constituency	Years	Notes
1	Mohsen Pezeshkpour	Khorramshahr	1967–1971	Leader
1	Mohsen Pezeshkpour	Khorramshahr	1978–1979	Leader
2	Mohammad Reza Ameli Tehrani	Mahabad	1967–1971	
3	Esmail Farivar	Urmia	1967–1971	
4	Fazlollah Sadr	Qom	1967–1971	Expelled
5	Hooshang Talé	Rudsar	1967–1971	
6	Parviz Zafari	Nahavand	1978–1979	
7	Manouchehr Yazdi	Ardakan	1978–1979	
8	Hossein Tabib	Bushehr	1978–1979	
