= Gholamreza Kianpour =

- غلامرضا کیانپور
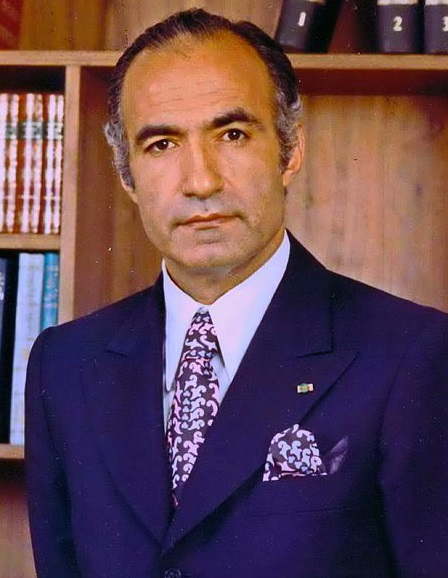

Governor of Isfahan province
- In office 1971–1974

Minister of Justice
- In office 9 November 1976 – 27 August 1978
- Monarch: Mohammad Reza Pahlavi
- Prime Minister: Amir-Abbas Hoveyda; Jamshid Amouzegar
- Succeeded by: Mohammad Baheri

Minister of Information and Tourism
- In office 29 May 1974 – 9 November 1976
- Preceded by: Hamid Rahnama
- Succeeded by: Daryoush Homayoun

Governor of West Azerbaijan province
- In office 1968–1971

Personal details
- Born: 1928 Tehran, Imperial State of Iran
- Died: 8 May 1979 (aged 50) Qasr Prison, Tehran
- Party: Rastakhiz Party
- Other political affiliations: Iran Novin Party
- Education: Tehran University
- Occupation: Politician

Gholamreza Kianpour (Persian: غلامرضا کیانپور; 1929 – 8 May 1979) was an Iranian politician and minister of justice in the government of Amir-Abbas Hoveyda and Jamshid Amouzegar between 9 November 1976 and 17 August 1978.

== Biography ==
Gholamreza Kianpour, son of Abdolvahab, was born in 1929 in Tehran. He completed his education at Daraei High School before earning a bachelor's degree in law from Tehran University Law School and later obtaining a doctorate degree in economics.

Initially serving as a judge in the Ministry of Justice, he subsequently held key roles including finance director of Organization of Program and Budget, head of recruitment for Principle Four, and deputy minister at Ministry of Economy in customs affairs. Shortly thereafter, he ascended to the position of chairman of the Supreme Administrative Council. Additionally, he was appointed Governor General of West Azerbaijan and Isfahan. In 1974, he was appointed as the Minister of Information and Tourism, and in 1976, he assumed the role of Minister of Justice, instrumental in the passage of new laws approved by parliament.

During his governorship tenure in West Azerbaijan province, amidst numerous development projects, the province acquired its first TV station—in mid 1960's that was a remarkable achievement.

His governorship in Isfahan was a flourishing period in the formation of Isfahan city and province as it is today. According to Dariush Homayoun, he was one of the most efficient politicians in Iran during the Pahlavi era.

Beyond his governmental duties, he contributed to academia by teaching at various institutions including the Faculty of Business, Polytechnic Institute, Superior School of Accounting and Police Academy. He is also recognized for his authorship in the fields of budgeting principles and economics.

During his tenure as Minister of Information and Tourism he initiated Iran's largest tourism project by constructing tens of hotels and motels near the historic sites together with a program for training and education of staff to manage those sites.

Dr. Kianpour established two specialized governmental schools: the first aimed at training professionals in the tourism industry during his tenure at the Ministry of Information and Tourism, and the second school focused on training specialists in administrative and judicial affairs within the Ministry of Justice. This initiative was designed to enhance the efficiency of judicial procedures and provide support to judges in their duties.

GH.Kianpour was renowned as one of Iran's adept writers and translators. Notably, his translations have become seminal works and textbooks in Iranian universities. Some of his notable translations include:
- Industrial Development
- Education of Human Resources for Commerce and Industrial Development
- Technology and Economic Development
- He also translated excerpts from the works of Paul Samuelson, the Nobel laureate in economics.

He was killed on 8 May 1979, along with the Speaker of the National Assembly, Javad Saeed and Mohammad Reza Ameli Tehrani, minister of information and tourism and minister of education.
