= Ansary =

Surname list

Ansary is the surname of the following people

- Abdulrahman al-Ansary (1935–2023), Saudi Arabian archaeology professor
- Cyrus A. Ansary (born 1934), American lawyer and philanthropist
- Hushang Ansary (1927–2026), Iranian-American diplomat
- Nina Ansary (born 1966), Iranian-American historian and author
- Tamim Ansary (born 1948), Afghan-American author
- Waleed El-Ansary, Egyptian-American economist
