= Hossein Tabib =

Iranian politician

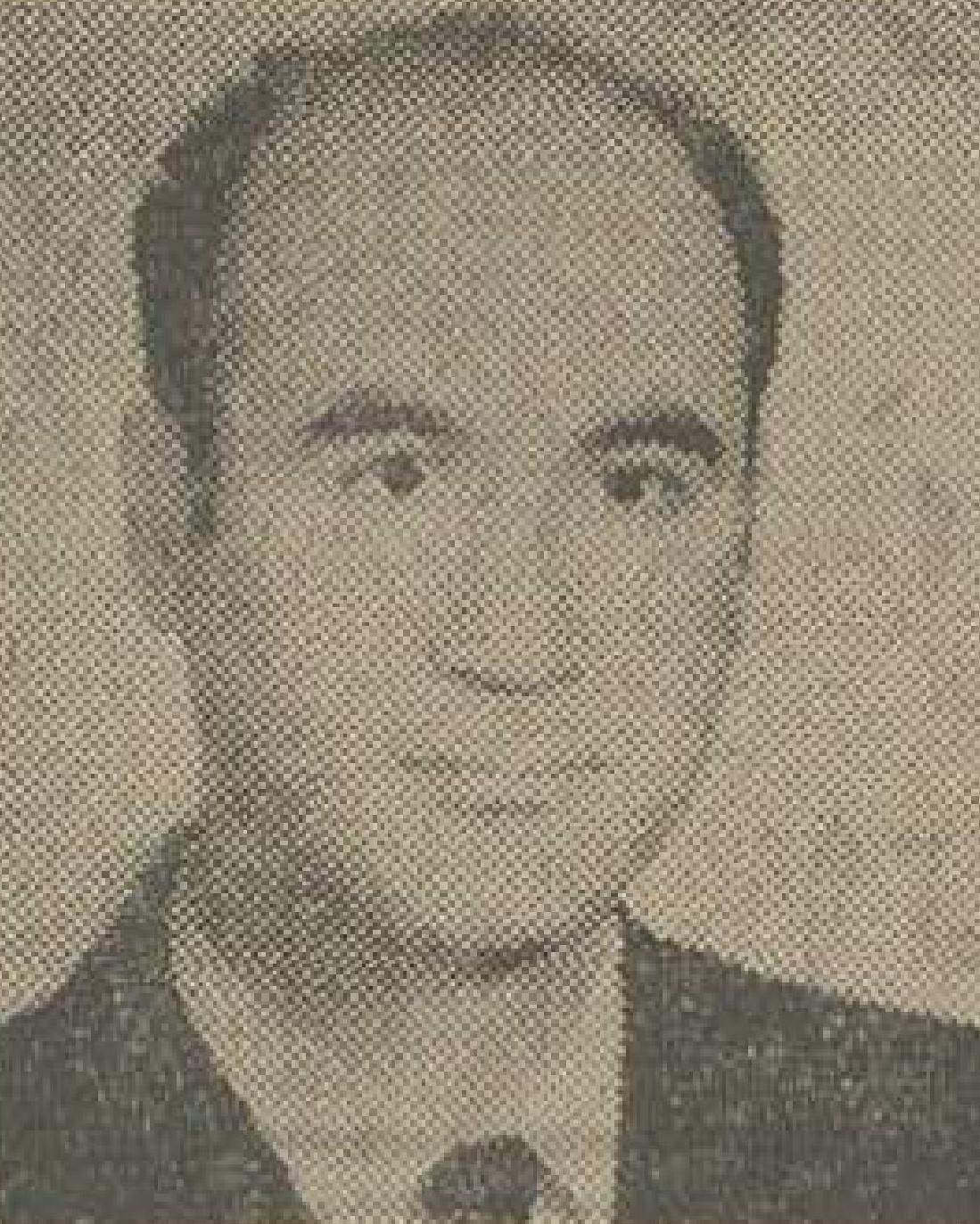
- Tabib in 1975

Member of the Parliament
- In office 8 September 1975 – 15 January 1979
- Constituency: Bushehr

Mayor of Bushehr
- In office 1958–1960

Personal details
- Born: 1927 (age 98–99) Bushehr, Iran
- Party: Pan-Iranist Party
- Other political affiliations: Resurgence Party (1975–1978)
- Profession: Dentist

Hossein Tabib (Persian: حسین طبیب; born 1927 in Bushehr) is an Iranian dentist and pan-Iranist politician who served as a member of parliament from 1975 to 1979, having previously held office as the mayor of Bushehr.

A graduate of University of Tehran, Tabib owned a private dentistry clinic in his native city, Bushehr, from 1960 to 1975. He also headed the city's Red Lion and Sun Society between 1957 and 1962.

He resigned from Resurgence Party in June 1978.
