= Fazlollah Sadr =

Politician

- Sadr with Pan-Iranist Party's attire

Member of the Parliament
- In office 31 August 1971 – 8 September 1975
- Constituency: Kahak
- In office 6 October 1967 – 31 August 1971
- Constituency: Qom

Personal details
- Born: Fazlollah Mirzaei Qom, Persia
- Party: Resurgence Party (1975–1978); Iranians' Party (1971–1975); Pan-Iranist Party (1947–1971)
- Education: University of Tehran

Fazlollah Sadr (Persian: فضل‌الله صدر) was an Iranian pan-Iranist politician who served as a member of the parliament from 1967 to 1975.

A senior member of the Pan-Iranist Party, he was expelled from the party after he voted in favor of Bahraini Independence in the parliament and in early 1971 he founded Iranians' Party and became its leader.

Party political offices
Vacant Party established	Secretary-General of the Iranians' Party; 1971–1975	Vacant Party dissolved
