= Parviz Zafari =

Iranian politician

Member of the Parliament
- In office 8 September 1975 – 15 January 1979
- Constituency: Nahavand
- Majority: 18,463

Personal details
- Party: Pan-Iranist Party
- Other political affiliations: Resurgence Party (1975–1978)
- Profession: Engineer

Parviz Zafari (Persian: پرویز ظفری) is an Iranian pan-Iranist politician who served as a member of parliament from 1975 to 1979. He resigned from the Resurgence Party in June 1978.

In 2023, Zafari was featured on the Humans of New York website, in a 54-part series describing his life before and after his work as a legislator in Iran.
