= Esmail Farivar =

Iranian politician (1927–2011)

Member of the Parliament
- In office 6 October 1967 – 31 August 1971
- Constituency: Rezaiyeh

Personal details
- Born: 23 July 1927
- Died: 29 September 2011 (aged 84) McLean, Virginia, United States
- Party: Pan-Iranist Party
- Profession: Diplomat

Esmail Farivar (Persian: اسماعیل فریور) was an Iranian pan-Iranist politician who served as a member of parliament from 1967 to 1971, representing Rezaiyeh. Farivar was a graduate of political science from University of Tehran, and for some time worked as an attaché at the Iranian embassy in Paris.
