= Fereydoun Mahdavi =

Deputy Secretary-General of the Rastakhiz Party from 1975 to 1976

1st Deputy Secretary-General of the Rastakhiz Party
- In office 2 March 1975 – 28 October 1976
- Secretary-General: Amir-Abbas Hoveyda
- Preceded by: Party established
- Succeeded by: Mohammad Reza Ameli Tehrani

Minister of Commerce
- In office 1974–1976
- Prime Minister: Amir-Abbas Hoveyda

Minister without portfolio for Sports
- In office 1976–1978
- Prime Minister: Amir-Abbas Hoveyda

Personal details
- Born: 1932 Tehran, Iran
- Died: 2014 (aged 81–82) Paris, France
- Party: Resurgence Party (1975–78)
- Other political affiliations: National Front (1960s)
- Relatives: Mehdi Samii
- Education: University of Hamburg

Fereydoun Mahdavi (Persian: فریدون مهدوی) was an Iranian economist and politician who was the Deputy Secretary-General of the Rastakhiz Party during the tenure of Amir-Abbas Hoveyda. From 1974 to 1978, he served in the cabinet under Amir-Abbas Hoveyda.

During the 1960s, Mahdavi was a member of the opposition National Front, having been arrested during student protests and jailed as an anti-Shah political prisoner for less than a year. In 1975, he joined the royalist Resurgence Party as a high-ranking member, which severely damaged his reputation.

Party political offices
New title Party established	Deputy Secretary-General of the Resurgence Party; 1975–1976	Succeeded by Mohammad Reza Ameli Tehrani
