= Prisoner 382 - The Fate of a Persian Spy =

Prisoner 382 – The Fate of a Persian Spy
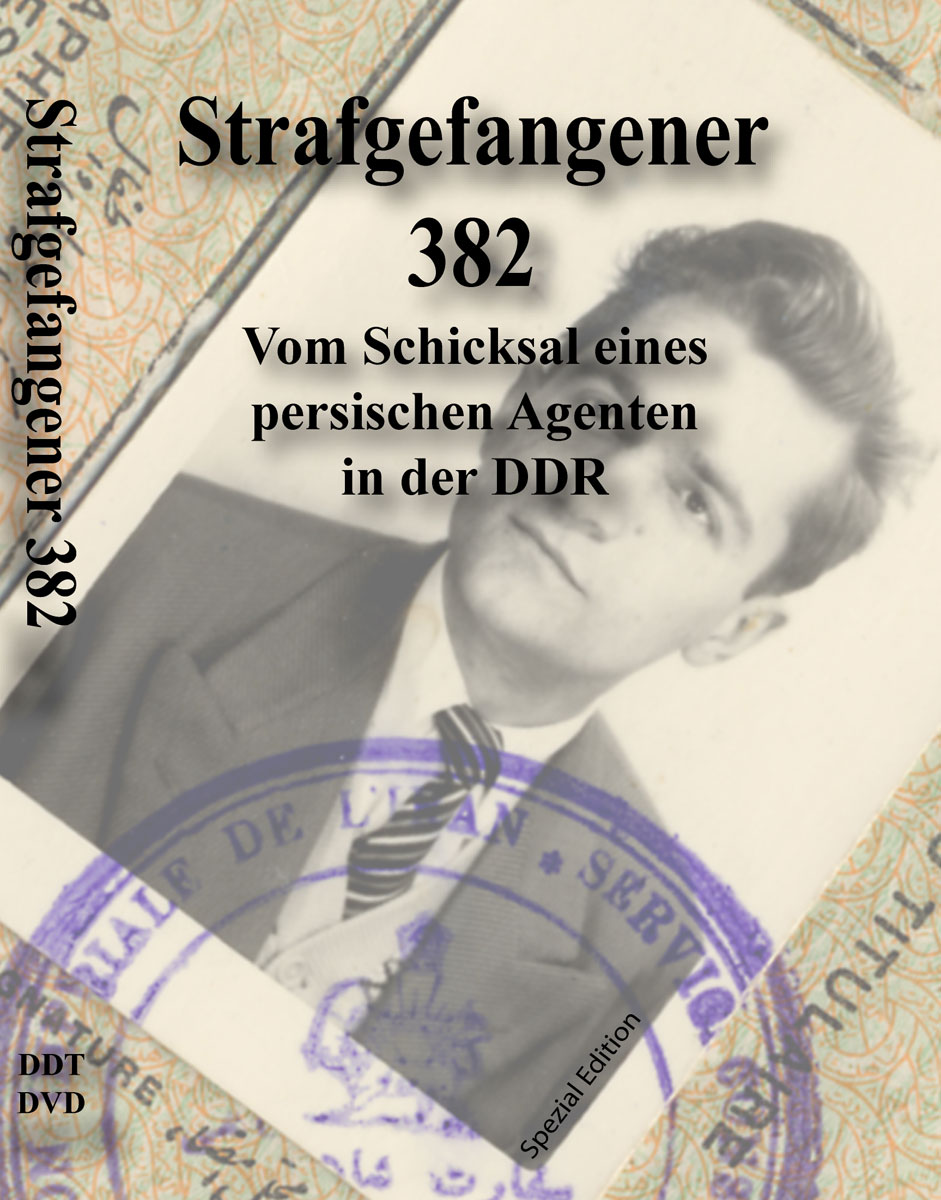
- Strafgefangener 382 – German release poster
- Directed by: DDT (das freie Dokumentarfilm Team)
- Written by: DDT (das freie Dokumentarfilm Team)
- Produced by: Ralf Gründer
- Starring: Farah Pahlavi; Daryoush Homayoun; Hossein Yazdi; Feridoun Yazdi; Pamela Mattow; Falco Werkentin; Karl Wilhelm Fricke
- Cinematography: Ralf Gründer
- Edited by: Chandra Fleig
- Music by: Chandra Fleig
- Production company: DDT (das freie Dokumentarfilm Team)
- Release date: 1 January 2003 (Germany)
- Running time: 43 minutes
- Countries: Germany, United States
- Languages: English, Persian, German

Prisoner 382 – the fate of a Persian spy (German: Strafgefangener 382) is a German biographical documentary film which was shown on BBC Persian Television on 8 May 2015.

The film was directed by DDT (German: Das freie Dokumentarfilm Team), a German independent film documentary company and portrays the life of the Iranian Hossein Yazdi.

== Description ==
In 1954, the young Iranian Hossein Yazdi moved from Tehran to East Berlin to begin his studies in agricultural economics in the German Democratic Republic (GDR). Soon, he was confronted with the socialistic system in the GDR and decided to gather information about the Iranian communists living in the GDR. While he was trying to deliver this information to the secret service in West Berlin, he was arrested at Checkpoint Charlie on 26 October 1961, and isolated in solitary confinement in Bautzen II, a secret prison run by the Stasi, the Ministry for State Security in the GDR.

Despite intense efforts of the International Society for Human Rights and his parents living in Tehran, it took over 15 years, until the Shah Mohammad Reza Pahlavi could arrange his release in 1978.

== Production ==
The documentary was shot in Germany and the United States in 2001 and 2003 and was produced by German journalist Ralf Gründer. Together with Chandra Fleig, he directed the film, with whom he founded the independent film documentary company DDT, based in Berlin.
