= Mohsen Pezeshkpour =

Pan Iranian Politician

- محسن پزشکپور
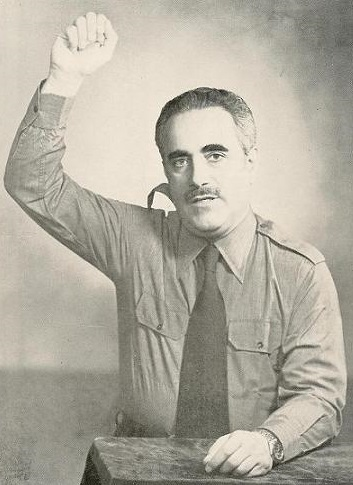

Member of the Parliament
- In office 8 September 1975 – 15 January 1979
- Constituency: Khorramshahr
- In office 6 October 1967 – 31 August 1971
- Constituency: Khorramshahr
- Majority: 10,645 (96.9%)

Personal details
- Born: c. 1927 Tehran, Iran
- Died: 6 January 2011 (aged 83–84) Tehran, Iran
- Resting place: Behesht-e-Sakineh cemetery, Karaj
- Party: Pan-Iranist Party
- Other political affiliations: Resurgence Party (1975–1978)
- Education: University of Tehran
- Profession: Attorney

Mohsen "Pendar" Pezeshkpour (Persian: محسن پزشک‌پور; c. 1927 – 6 January 2011) was an Iranian pan-Iranist politician who served as a member of the parliament from 1967 to 1971, and 1975 to 1979. He was the co-founder and leader of the Pan-Iranist Party.

Party political offices
Vacant Leadership Committee	Leader of the Pan-Iranist Party; 1967–1997	Vacant Supreme Leadership Council
New title	Head of the Pan-Iranist parliamentary group 1967–1971; 1978–1979	Vacant
