= Dariush Homayoon =

Deputy Secretary-General of the Rastakhiz Party from 1977 to 1978

Dariush Homayoun

3rd Deputy Secretary-General of the Rastakhiz Party
- In office 7 August 1977 – 20 January 1978
- Secretary-General: Mohammad Baheri
- Preceded by: Mohammad Reza Ameli Tehrani
- Succeeded by: Javad Saeed

Minister of Information and Tourism
- In office 7 August 1977 – 16 September 1978
- Prime Minister: Jamshid Amouzegar
- Succeeded by: Mohammad Reza Tehrani

Personal details
- Born: 27 September 1928 Tehran, Imperial State of Iran
- Died: 28 January 2011 (aged 82) Geneva, Switzerland
- Party: Constitutionalist Party (1994–2011); Resurgence Party (1975–1978); New Iran Party (1963–1975); National Front (1960–1961); SUMKA (1952–1953); Nation Party (1951–1952); Pan-Iranist Party (1949–1951)
- Spouse: Homa Zahedi

Daryoush Homayoun (Persian: داریوش همایون; 27 September 1928 – 28 January 2011) was an Iranian journalist, author, intellectual, and politician who was the Deputy Secretary-General of the Rastakhiz Party during the tenure of Mohammad Baheri. He was the Minister of Information and Tourism in the cabinet of Jamshid Amouzegar, founder of the daily newspaper Ayandegan, and one-time high-ranking member of the Rastakhiz party.

In exile, he became one of the founders of the Constitutionalist Party of Iran. He was famous for his analytical writings and largely impartial assessment of history. His outspoken manner, criticizing the Islamic Republic with harsh tones, but also directing his criticism at the Pahlavi policies, earned him the respect of many, while at the same time creating many enemies. He was one of the most influential Iranian opposition leaders in exile.

== Youth ==
Homayoun was born in Tehran on 27 September 1928 and began his involvement in the political sphere at the age of fourteen. In his younger years he was a member of several Iranian far-right parties, generally with nationalist and racialist views that opposed the rise of leftist ideas along with the influence of the Tudeh party. One of these parties was SUMKA. Homayoun was an early member of SUMKA. Prior to SUMKA, he was a member of the Pan-Iranist Party. He began as a supporter of Mohammad Mossadegh but was imprisoned during Mossadegh's premiership.

== Journalistic and political career ==
In the years following 1953, Homayoun finished his university studies, obtaining a doctorate in political science from the University of Tehran. After completing his Nieman Fellowship at Harvard, he took on the role of a field consultant in Asia for the New York office of the Franklin Book Programs. During this time, he conducted surveys to assess the distribution challenges in Malaysia and Indonesia.

He worked at the Iranian daily Ettelaat and later founded the highly successful daily newspaper Ayandegan. In the cabinet of Jamshid Amouzegar, he became the minister of information and tourism. Following the events leading up to the Iranian Revolution, he was arrested in November 1978, together with many other former officials, due to the allegations of corruption and power misuse. He escaped prison on 12 February 1979, just after the revolution, and went into hiding. Fifteen months later, he left Iran through the border with Turkey and went to Paris. He later lived in Geneva, Switzerland.

== Exile ==
In exile, Homayoun was an influential political analyst, writer, and opposition leader. In 1994, he initiated and helped create the Constitutionalist Party of Iran, a political party seeking to establish a liberal democratic Iran.

== Personal life and death ==
Daryoush Homayoun was married to Homa Zahedi, sister of Ardeshir Zahedi. He died on 28 January 2011 in Geneva, Switzerland at the age of 82.

Political offices
Preceded by Mohammad Reza Ameli Tehrani	Minister of Information and Tourism; 1977–1978	Succeeded by Gholam Reza Kiyanpour
Party political offices
Preceded by None	Leader of Constitutionalist Party; 1994–2004	Succeeded by Foad Pashaie
Preceded by Mohammad Reza Ameli Tehrani	Deputy Secretary-General of the Resurgence Party; 1977–1978	Succeeded by Javad Saeed
