= Hooshang Talé =

Iranian politician (born 1933)

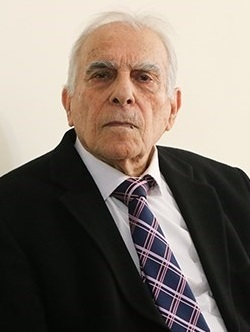
- Talé in 2019

Member of the Parliament
- In office 6 October 1967 – 31 August 1971
- Constituency: Rudsar

Personal details
- Born: 1933 (age 92–93) Tehran, Iran
- Party: Pan-Iranist Party
- Education: University of Graz

Hooshang Talé (Persian: هوشنگ طالع) is an Iranian pan-Iranist politician who served as a member of parliament from 1967 to 1971, representing Rudsar. He was an expert at economics bureau of the Planning Organisation of Iran and holds a PhD in political science and economics, obtained from University of Graz in Austria.

== Bibliography ==
- Iran in the Claws of the Bear: The Failed Soviet Landgrab of 1946 (2007)
