= Abdollah Riazi =

Iranian politician (1905–1979)

- عبدالله ریاضی
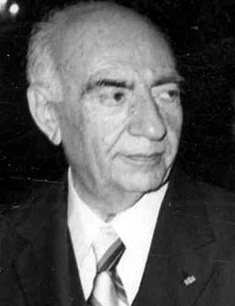

16th Speaker of the Parliament of Iran
- In office 5 August 1963 – 7 October 1978
- Preceded by: Reza Hekmat
- Succeeded by: Javad Saeed

Personal details
- Born: 1905 Isfahan, Sublime State of Iran
- Died: 11 April 1979 (aged 73–74) Tehran, Iran
- Cause of death: Execution by firing squad
- Party: Resurgence Party (1975–1978); New Iran Party (1963–1975)
- Education: Lycée Clemenceau
- Profession: Mathematician

Abdollah Riazi (Persian: عبدالله ریاضی) was an Iranian politician who served as the Speaker of the Parliament of Iran for almost 15 years during the Pahlavi era.

According to Ali Rahnema, Riazi was "one of permanent and trusted figures" in the establishment, thus "experienced and adept at political correctness". Fakhreddin Azimi describes Riazi as having an "unquestioning deference toward the Shah", which "contrasted sharply with his disdainful attitude toward the deputies, whom he treated virtually as schoolchildren".

== Parliamentary career ==
In 1963, Abdollah Riazi became a candidate for the 21st Parliament and was elected as the top deputy from Tehran.

He was then elected as member of the executive committee and Speaker of the Majles (Parliament or Congress) for the first time.

He remained Speaker of the Parliament in the 22nd and 23rd term, for three consecutive full four year terms or 12 years. In the 24th term he served as Speaker in the beginning of the term, but was succeeded by Javad Saeed.

== Death ==
Following the Iranian Revolution, he was arrested and faced three charges in the Islamic Revolutionary Court, including "corruption on earth", "collaborating with the former regime and trying to re-establish the Shah's idolatrous rule over the weak and defenceless people" and "treason"; eventually leading to execution.

Assembly seats
Preceded by Reza Hekmat	Speaker of the Parliament of Iran; 1963–1978	Succeeded by Javad Saeed
