= Manouchehr Yazdi =

Iranian teacher and pan-Iranist politician

- منوچهر یزدی

Member of the Parliament
- In office 8 September 1975 – 15 January 1979
- Succeeded by: Mohammad Khatami
- Constituency: Ardakan

Personal details
- Born: c. 1939 (age 86–87) Quchan, Persia
- Party: Pan-Iranist Party
- Other political affiliations: Resurgence Party (1975–1978)
- Education: Tarbiat Moallem University

Manouchehr Yazdi (Persian: منوچهر یزدی) is an Iranian teacher and pan-Iranist politician who served as a member of parliament from 1975 to 1979. Yazdi is a senior Pan-Iranist Party member. He resigned from Resurgence Party in June 1978.

Party political offices
Unknown	Spokesperson of the Pan-Iranist Party; Unknown–Present	Incumbent
Unknown	Secretary of the Pan-Iranist Party in Yazd; Unknown–1975	Vacant Office abolished
