= Hushang Ansary =

Iranian-American politician and businessman (1927–2026)

- هوشنگ انصاری
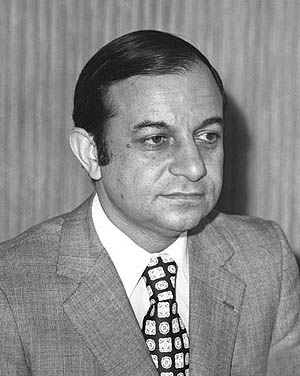
- Ansary in 1977

Minister of Finance
- In office 1 March 1974 – 23 December 1977
- Prime Minister: Amir-Abbas Hoveyda; Jamshid Amouzegar
- Preceded by: Jamshid Amouzegar
- Succeeded by: Mohammad Yeganeh

Minister of Tourism and Information
- In office 29 December 1971 – 1 March 1974
- Prime Minister: Amir-Abbas Hoveyda
- Preceded by: Hassan Pakravan
- Succeeded by: Mohammad Reza Ameli Tehrani

Ambassador of Iran to the United States
- In office 25 May 1967 – 1 October 1969
- Prime Minister: Amir-Abbas Hoveyda
- Preceded by: Khosrow Khosrovani
- Succeeded by: Amir Aslan Afshar

Personal details
- Born: 16 July 1927 Ahvaz, Imperial State of Persia
- Died: 3 January 2026 (aged 98)
- Party: Rastakhiz Party (Iran); Republican Party (United States)
- Spouses: Maryam Panahi (divorced); Shahla Ansary
- Relations: Cyrus A. Ansary (brother)
- Children: 2, including Nina

Hushang Ansary (Persian: هوشنگ انصاری, 16 July 1927 – 3 January 2026) was an Iranian-American diplomat, businessman, and philanthropist. He served in the Imperial Iranian government for 18 years prior to the Iranian Revolution, including as minister of finance from 1974 to 1977 and as ambassador to the United States from 1967 to 1969. He also served as chairman of companies in both Iran and the United States.

== Early life ==
Hushang Ansary was born in Ahvaz, Khuzestan province, on 16 July 1927. He was the older brother of Cyrus A. Ansary.

He began his career as a newspaper and magazine photographer in Ahvaz, Tehran, and the United Kingdom before moving to Japan in 1954, where he continued his work in photography.

== Career ==
=== Imperial Iranian government ===
In Japan, Ansary met Abbas Aram, Iran's ambassador to Japan, who brought him to the attention of Mohammad Reza Shah Pahlavi. The Shah asked Ansary to return to Iran and subsequently appointed him to several government positions beginning in 1961, including undersecretary of commerce, ambassador to Pakistan, and minister of information.

From May 1967 to October 1969, Ansary served as Iran's ambassador to the United States. In 1974, he became minister of finance. During this period, he assisted the Shah in providing millions of dollars in aid and grants to other countries and signed an agreement with U.S. Secretary of State Henry Kissinger to develop eight nuclear power plants in Iran.

Ansary was described as one of the wealthiest men in Iran during the Pahlavi era. By the mid-1970s, the CIA considered him to be one of the seventeen members of "the Shah's Inner Circle" and one of the leading candidates to succeed Amir Abbas Hoveyda as prime minister of Iran. Ultimately, the position was awarded to Jamshid Amouzegar, a leading progressive member of the Rastakhiz Party, rather than to Ansary, who was associated with more establishment positions. In November 1977, he was appointed director of the National Iranian Oil Company.

=== Later activities ===
As the Iranian Revolution neared, Ansary resigned from the National Iranian Oil Company and moved to the United States, citing health problems. He became a U.S. citizen in 1986.

In the 1980s, Ansary founded the Parman Group, a holding company focused on leisure industries, textiles, international trade, and real estate. Its holdings included IRI International, a manufacturer of oilfield equipment. In 2005, IRI International was sold to National Oilwell Varco. Ansary served as chairman of Stewart & Stevenson until the company was acquired by Kirby Corporation in September 2018.

==== Politics ====
Ansary was a member of the Republican Party and was known to be a friend and business associate of prominent Republican politicians Henry Kissinger, Alexander Haig, and James Baker. He served on the National Finance Committee for the 2004 presidential reelection campaign of George W. Bush. In 2015, he and his wife donated $2 million to a Super PAC supporting the presidential campaign of Jeb Bush. In 2017, they donated $2 million to inaugural committee of Donald Trump.

== Philanthropy ==
Ansary was involved in the creation of several medical and educational institutions, such as the University of St. Martin and the James Baker Institute. In February 2014, Ansary supported the A Thousand Years of the Persian Book Exhibition at the Library of Congress.

== Personal life and death ==
In 1964, Ansary married Maryam Panahi, who held a prominent social cricle in Iranian politics. They had a daughter together, Nina. According to historian Abbas Milani, the marriage later "came to a bitter end". Ansary and his second wife, Shahla, lived in Houston, Texas.

Ansary died of cardiac arrest on 3 January 2026 at the age of 98. (Note: Some sources mislabel his death date as "January 4, 2026".)

== Awards and honors ==
- Ellis Island Medal of Honor (2003) and the Woodrow Wilson Award.
- Weill Cornell Medical College of Cornell University established the Ansary Center for Stem Cell Therapeutics in 2004 in honor of a grant from Ansary and his wife Shahla.
- The American Academy of Diplomacy's Ansary Outreach Program; named in his honor in 2004.
- The Ansary Gallery of American History at the George Bush Presidential Library; named in his honor in 2004.
- James A. Baker III Prize for Excellence in Leadership (2013)
