= Mohammad Baheri =

Secretary-General of the Rastakhiz Party from 1977 to 1978

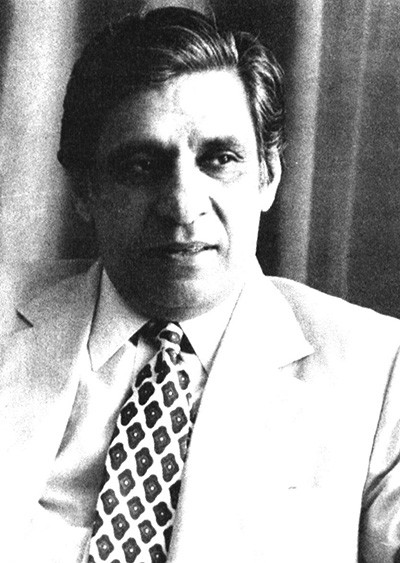

3rd Secretary-General of the Rastakhiz Party
- In office 7 August 1977 – 20 January 1978
- Deputy: Dariush Homayoon
- Preceded by: Jamshid Amouzegar
- Succeeded by: Jamshid Amouzegar

Minister of Justice
- In office 27 August 1978 – 29 October 1978
- Prime Minister: Jafar Sharif-Emami
- Succeeded by: Hossein Najafi

Personal details
- Born: 1918 Shiraz, Sublime State of Iran
- Died: 2007 (aged 88–89) Washington D.C.
- Party: Rastakhiz Party

Mohammad Motazad Bahri (Persian: محمد معتضد باهری; 1918 – 2007) was an Iranian politician who served as the third Secretary-General of the Rastakhiz Party from 7 August 1977 to 20 January 1978, and later the Minister of Justice from 27 August 1978 to 29 October 1978.

Party political offices
Preceded by Jamshid Amouzegar	Secretary-General of the Resurgence Party; 1977–1978	Succeeded by Jamshid Amouzegar
