= Mohammad-Amin Riahi =

Iranian scholar and statesman (1923–2009)

- محمدامین ریاحی
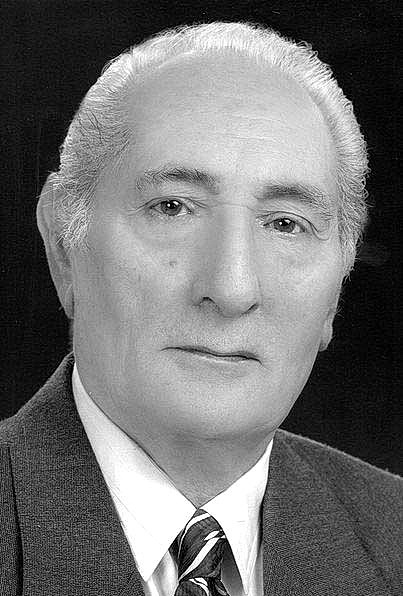
- Riahi, 1980s

Minister of Education
- In office 4 January 1979 – 10 February 1979
- Prime Minister: Shapour Bakhtiar
- Preceded by: Mohammad Reza Ameli Tehrani
- Succeeded by: Gholam-Hossein Shokouhi

Personal details
- Born: 1 June 1923 Khoy, Sublime State of Iran
- Died: 15 May 2009 (aged 85) Tehran, Iran
- Occupation: literary scholar of Persian literature, historian, writer, statesman

Mohammad-Amin Riahi (Persian: محمدامین ریاحی; 1 June 1923, Khoy – 15 May 2009, Tehran) was a prominent Iranian literary scholar of Persian literature, a historian, writer, and statesman. Apart from being one of the authors of Dehkhoda Dictionary and Encyclopædia Iranica, he was the author and editor of several well-known scholarly books.

Mohammad-Amin Riahi received his PHD on Persian literature from Tehran University under the supervision of Badiozzaman Forouzanfar. Riahi is best known for his scholarly works on Shahnameh and Ferdowsi, Hafiz, and the ancient iranian languages (especially Azari Language). He has produced critical editions of some of the major classical Persian texts such as Mersad-al-ebad and Nozhat-al-majalis. During a course of 60 years he published numerous scholarly articles, a selection of which are gathered in a volume titled Forty essays on language, literature and history of Iran.

Among numerous cultural positions he held during his career, Riahi was a professor of Tehran University, the founding member and later president of the Shahnameh Foundation (1971–1979), vice-chairman of the Iranian Academy of Literature and Arts, and Iranian Minister of Education (1979).

== Selected bibliography ==
Critical Editions of old Persian books:

- Jahan-Nameh, Mohammad ibn Najib Bakran (1963)
- Meftah-al-Moamelat, Mohammad ibn Ayub Tabari (1970)
- Mersad-al-ebad, Najmeddin Razi (1973)
- Alamaraye Naderi, Mohammad-Kazem Marvi (1983)
- Nozhat-al-majalis, Jamal Khalil Sharvani (1996)

Literary and Historical research books:

- Kisai Marvazi, his life and poetry (1988)
- Poetry and thoughts of Hafiz (1988)
- Persian language and literature in Ottoman territory (1990)
- A History of Khoy (1993)
- Early sources on Ferdowsi and Shahnameh (1993)
- Ferdowsi, his life, thoughts and poetry (1996)
- Forty essays on language, literature and history of Iran (2000)
