= Javad Saeed =

Secretary-General of the Rastakhiz Party in 1978

- جواد سعید
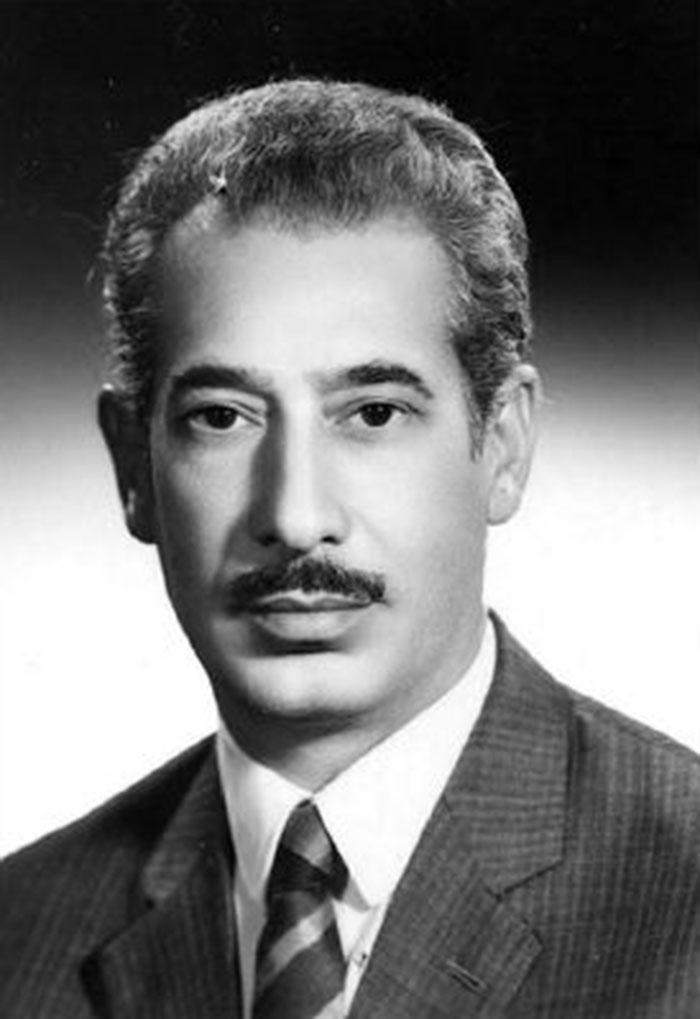

5th Secretary-General of the Rastakhiz Party
- In office 20 August 1978 – 1 November 1978
- Deputy: Himself
- Preceded by: Jamshid Amouzegar
- Succeeded by: Party disestablished

4th Deputy Secretary-General of the Rastakhiz Party
- In office 20 January 1978 – 1 November 1978
- Secretary-General: Jamshid Amouzegar; Himself
- Preceded by: Dariush Homayoon
- Succeeded by: Party disestablished

17th Speaker of the Parliament of Iran
- In office 7 October 1978 – 11 February 1979
- Preceded by: Abdollah Riazi
- Succeeded by: Akbar Hashemi Rafsanjani

Member of Regency Council
- In office 13 January 1979 – 22 January 1979
- Appointed by: Mohammad Reza Pahlavi

Personal details
- Born: c. 1923 or 1924 Sari, Imperial State of Iran
- Died: 8 May 1979 (aged 55) Tehran, Iran
- Cause of death: Execution by firing squad
- Party: Resurgence Party (1975–1978); New Iran Party (1963–1975)

Javad Saeed (Persian: جواد سعید) was an Iranian politician who served as the last Speaker of the Parliament of Iran during the Pahlavi era, and was the last secretary-general of the Resurgence Party and the deputy Secretary-General of the Rastakhiz Party during the second tenure of Jamshid Amouzegar and his own tenure. He represented Sari in the parliament.

Saeed was appointed as a member of the Regency Council in 1979. Following the Iranian Revolution, he was arrested and faced seven charges in the Islamic Revolutionary Court, including corruption on earth, war on God and on prophet, insulting the religion, massacre of innocent people, physical torture and procuring; eventually leading to his execution.

Assembly seats
Preceded by Abdollah Riazi	Speaker of the Parliament of Iran; 1978–1979	Vacant Revolution Title next held by Akbar Hashemi Rafsanjani
Party political offices
Preceded by Dariush Homayoon	Deputy Secretary-General of the Resurgence Party; 1978	Vacant Unknown
Preceded by Jamshid Amouzegar	Secretary-General of the Resurgence Party; 1978	Party dissolved
