= Iranians' Party =

1970–1975 political party in Iran

- Secretary-General: Fazlollah Sadr
- Founded: 1970 or January 1971
- Dissolved: 1975; 50 years ago
- Split from: Pan-Iranist Party
- Merged into: Rastakhiz Party
- Newspaper: Iranian weekly
- Ideology: Iranian nationalism Anti-communism
- Political position: Right-wing

The Iranians' Party (Persian: حزب ایرانیان, romanized: Ḥezb-e Īrānīyān) was a small political party in Iran during the Pahlavi dynasty. The party had one seat in the 23rd Majlis, the election of which was held in 1971.

The party's central committee was dominated by intellectuals and university professors. It claimed university students and guild members.

== Election results ==
=== Parliamentary elections ===
Election	Party leader	Seats won
1971	Fazlollah Sadr	1 / 268 (0.4%)
