= Leadership of the Rastakhiz Party =

Rastakhiz Party leadership

Logo of the Rastakhiz Party

This is a list of all leaders, secretary-generals and deputy secretary-generals of the Rastakhiz Party, the sole legal party in Iran from 1975 to 1978.

== Leader ==
Even though the secretary-general was the official leader of the party, Mohammad Reza Pahlavi was the de facto leader of the party as he was the one who held power within the Rastakhiz Party.

No.	Portrait	Name (Birth–Death)	Term		
No.	Portrait	Name (Birth–Death)	Took office	Left office	Time in office
1		Mohammad Reza Pahlavi (1919–1980)	2 March 1975	1 November 1978	3 years, 244 days

== Secretary-General ==
No.	Portrait	Name (Birth–Death)	Term		
No.	Portrait	Name (Birth–Death)	Took office	Left office	Time in office
1		Amir-Abbas Hoveyda (1919–1979)	2 March 1975	28 October 1976	1 year, 240 days
2		Jamshid Amouzegar (1923–2016)	28 October 1976	7 August 1977	283 days
3		Mohammad Baheri (1911–1995)	7 August 1977	20 January 1978	166 days
4		Jamshid Amouzegar (1923–2016)	20 January 1978	27 August 1978	219 days
5		Javad Saeed (1923/24–1979)	27 August 1978	1 November 1978	66 days

== Deputy Secretary-General ==
No.	Portrait	Name (Birth–Death)	Term		
No.	Portrait	Name (Birth–Death)	Took office	Left office	Time in office
1		Fereydoun Mahdavi (1932–2006)	2 March 1975	28 October 1976	1 year, 240 days
2		Mohammad Reza Ameli Tehrani (1927–1979)	28 October 1976	7 August 1977	283 days
3		Dariush Homayoon (1928–2011)	7 August 1977	20 January 1978	166 days
4		Javad Saeed (1923/24–1979)	20 January 1978	1 November 1978	285 days
