= Ayandegan =

Persian-language newspaper published in Iran (1967–1979)

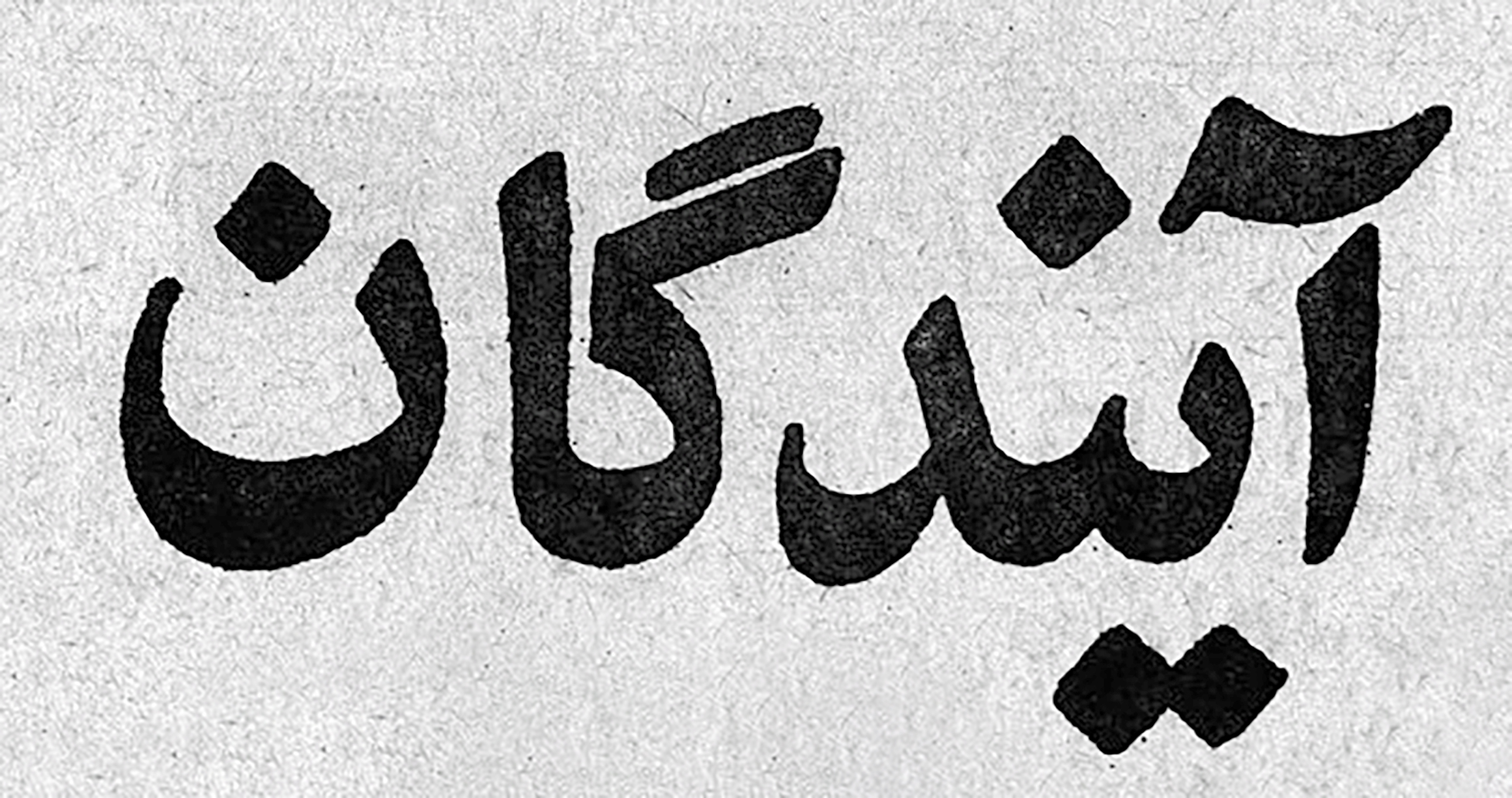
- Founder: Daryoush Homayoun
- Editor: Daryoush Homayoun (1967–1977)
- Founded: 16 December 1967
- Ceased publication: 8 August 1979
- Political alignment: Iranian nationalism Liberalism (Iranian)
- Language: Persian
- Headquarters: Tehran
- Country: Iran

Ayandegan (Persian: آیندگان lit. "The Future People") was one of the most influential and popular daily newspapers in Iran during Mohammad Reza Pahlavi's rule. It was the first morning daily paper of Iran. It had an independent and critical stance. The paper was also a liberal and nationalist publication in the Pahlavi period.

== History and profile ==
Ayandegan was founded in 1967 by Daryoush Homayoun, and its first issue appeared on 16 December that year. From its start in 1967 to 1977 Homayoun edited the paper, which held a liberal stance. The paper had its headquarters in Tehran.

In the immediate aftermath of the 1979 revolution, Ayandegan enjoyed higher levels of circulation selling 400,000 copies. However, the paper was banned on 12 May 1979 due to its criticisms over the Islamic government's censorship and limitations on the freedom of press. In fact, on the same day the paper published three empty pages to protest over the statements of Ayatullah Khomeini who declared that he would not read Ayandegan. Soon after this incident Ayatullah Khomeini stated that the paper was both depraved and deviationist. Then the revolutionary prosecutor closed the newspaper on 8 August 1979. The staff were also arrested.
