= Najm al-Din Razi =

13th-century Persian poet and philosopher

Abū Bakr 'Abdollāh b. Moḥammad b. Šahāvar b. Anūšervān al-Rāzī
- نجم‌الدین رازی
- Title: Najm Al-Din Razi

Personal life
- Born: 573/1177
- Died: 654/1256
- Era: Islamic golden age
- Main interest: Sufism
- Notable work: Mirsad Al-Ibad Men Mabda' Ela Al-Ma'ad

Religious life
- Religion: Islam
- Jurisprudence: Sufi
- Creed: Kubrawiyya

Muslim leader
- Influenced by: Najm ad-Din Kubra

Abū Bakr 'Abdollāh b. Moḥammad b. Šahāvar b. Anūšervān al-Rāzī (Persian: نجم‌الدین رازی) commonly known by the laqab, or sobriquet, of Najm al-Dīn Dāya, meaning "wetnurse" (573 AH/1177 – 654 AH/1256) was a 13th-century Sufi. Hamid Algar, translator of the Persian Merṣād to English, states the application of "wetnurse" to the author of the Merṣād derives from the idea of the initiate on the Path being a newborn infant who needs suckling to survive. Dāya followed the Sufi order, Kubrawiyya, established by one of his greatest influences, Najm al-Dīn Kubrā. Dāya traveled to Kārazm and soon became a morīd (pupil, one who follows the shaykh master and learns from him, undergoing spiritual training) of Najm al-Dīn Kubrā. Kubrā then appointed Shaikh Majd al-Dīn Bagdādī as the spiritual trainer who also became Dāya's biggest influence. Dāya constantly refers to al-Dīn Bagdādī as "our shaikh."

When his master, Najm al-Dīn Kubrā, was murdered in 618/1221, Dāya fled to Hamadan, then to Ardabil, and then to Anatolia where he finally settled with a fellow contemporary master Rumi.

There he put the teachings of his master Najm ad-Din Kubra into a writing in Persian called by the Arabic title Mirṣād al-ʻibād min al-mabdaʼ ilāʼl-maʻād (ِِArabic: مرصاد العباد من المبدأ الی المعاد) which is shortly known as Merṣād al-ʻebād, and has gained prominence as a major reference text on Sufism and Islamic theology. The critical edition of Merṣād al-ʻebād by Mohammad-Amin Riahi was published in 1973 in Tehran and since then has been continued to be in print. This is a closely annotated scholarly edition, along with a comprehensive introduction on the life and works of Najmoddin Razi, which has been the major reference for later studies on Najmoddin Razi and Sufism. Merṣād al-ʻebād was translated by Hamid Algar into English as The Path of God's Bondsmen: From Origin to Return.

== Biography ==
Rāzi was born to a Persian family in Rey, then one of the major centers of urban life and culture in pre-Mongol Iran, in 1177. At the age of 26, Rāzī travelled through Syria, Egypt, Ḥejāz, Iraq, and Azerbaijan. He finally settled in Khwārazm and soon become a murīd to Najm al-Dīn Kubrā, a mystical Sufi and founder of the Kubrawiya Order. Rāzī was then tutored by Shaikh Majd al-Dīn Baḡdādī, who Rāzī often refers to as "our shaikh". Rāzī then fled Khwārazm due to Kubrā’s prophecy of a Mongol invasion. Finally, Rāzī fled Rey as well, willingly abandoning his family to the Mongol invasion. Traveling via Hamadān, Erbīl, and Diyarbekir, he reached Kayseri in central Anatolia in Ramadān 618/October 1221. Thanks to Seljuq patronage, Anatolia was a center for the cultivation of Persian literature.

At Malatya, Razi met Shaikh Sehab al-Din Abu Hafs ‘Omar al-Sohravardi, nephew of the founder of the Sohravardi order. He completed the Merad at Sivas in August 1223.

== The Path of God's Bondsmen: From Origin to Return ==
The term Merṣād refers to the path from Qur'anic verse 89:14; "Verily thy Lord watches over the path". The divine vigilance implied here is generally taken as referring to God's omniscience of men's deeds, but it is plain that Dāya takes it in a slightly different sense, that of a protective and guarding vigilance. The second part of the title, men al-mabda' elā' l-ma'ād ("from origin to return") is to be found in the titles of many works that purport to treat in comprehensive fashion both cosmogony and eschatology and all that lies between.

The comprehensiveness promised in this title of the work is amply fulfilled in its text. It deals, in a systematic manner, with the origins of the various realms and orders of creation, prophethood and the different dimensions of religion, the ritual practices, mores, and institutions of Sufism, the destinations that await different classes of men in the hereafter, and the fashion in which different professions and trades may come to yield spiritual benefit and heavenly reward.

A particular virtue of the book is its clear demonstration of the Qur'anic origins of Sufism. The numerous quotations from the Qur'an are not to be regarded as mere ornament, nor even as scriptural proofs adduced in support of various statements. Rather, they bear witness to the fact that for Dāya, as for other Sufis, the Qur'an constitutes a well-structured, seamless, and coherent universe. The Qur'anic verses encountered throughout the book are the loom on which it is woven, a particular sense for each verse being implied by the context in which it occurs.

Another prominent feature of the book is the frequency with which it draws parallels between the inner and the outer worlds, particularly with references to processes of growth and development i.e. seed, tree, branch, fruit; the emergence of the hen from the egg. Dāya says in his commentary of the Qur'an, "Verily all that God created in the world of form has its like in the world of meaning; all that He created in the world of meaning- this being the hereafter- has its true essence in the world of reality, which is the uttermost unseen. Know too that of all that God created in all the worlds, a specimen and sample is present in man." It follows, then, that inner and unseen processes may be accurately described in terms of their outer counterparts.
The literary importance of the Merṣād is considerable: it ranks among the masterpieces of Persian literature, and certain sections – particularly the narrative of the creation and appointment of Adam – bear comparison with the best prose written in Persian. Dāya's choice of illustrative verses- both those of his own composition and those of his predecessors -is judicious, and makes of his work an incidental anthology of Sufi poetry, particularly quatrains. The Merṣād was translated into Chinese by Wu Zixian in approximately 1660 and was taught in Chinese Muslim schools up until the early twentieth century.

=== Chapters ===
- First Part
  - First Chapter: The Utility of Composing This Work
  - Second Chapter: The Reason for Writing the Book
  - Third Chapter: The Manner and Method the Book is Written
- Second Part
  - First Chapter: The Creation of Spirits and the Degrees of Knowledge
  - Second Chapter: The World Of Dominion
  - Third Chapter: The Different Realms of Kingship and Dominion
  - Fourth Chapter: The Creation of the Human Frame
  - Fifth Chapter: The Attachment of the Spirit to the Frame
- Third Part
  - First Chapter: The Veils That Cover the Human Spirit
  - Second Chapter: The Wise Purpose for Attachment of the Spirit to the Frame
  - Third Chapter: The Need for Prophets
  - Fourth Chapter: The Abrogation of Previous Religions
  - Fifth Chapter: The Cultivation of the Human Frame
  - Sixth Chapter: The Refinement of the Soul
  - Seventh Chapter: The Purification of the Heart
  - Eight Chapter: The Adornment of the Spirit
  - Ninth Chapter: The Need for a Shaikh
  - Tenth Chapter: The Conditions and Attributes of the Shaikh
  - Eleventh Chapter: The Conditions, Attributes, and Customs of the Morīd
  - Twelfth Chapter: The Need for Zekr
  - Thirteenth Chapter: The Method of Zekr
  - Fourteenth Chapter: The Transmission of Zekr
  - Fifteenth Chapter: The Need for Seclusion
  - Sixteenth Chapter: Visions Deriving from the Unseen
  - Seventeenth Chapter: The Witnessing of Lights
  - Eighteenth Chapter: Manifestation of the Divine Essence
  - Twentieth Chapter: Attaining to the Divine Presence
- Fourth Part
  - First Chapter: The Return of the Oppressive Soul
  - Second Chapter: The Return of the Inspired Soul
  - Third Chapter: The Return of the Foremost Soul
  - Fourth Chapter: The Return of the Most Wretched Soul
- Fifth Part
  - First Chapter: The Wayfaring of Kings
  - Second Chapter: Kings and Their Conduct
  - Third Chapter: The Wayfaring of Minister and Deputies
  - Fourth Chapter: The Wayfaring of Different Classes of Scholar
  - Fifth Chapter: The Wayfaring of the Holders of Wealth
  - Sixth Chapter: The Wayfaring of Farmers
  - Seventh Chapter: They Wayfaring of Merchants
  - Eight Chapter: The Wayfaring of Tradesmen and Craftsmen

== Other works ==
- His most famous was Merṣād al-'ebād men al-mabdā' elā'l-ma'ād or The Path of God's Bondsmen: From Origin to Return.
- Marmūzāt-e Asadī dar mazmūrāt-e Dā'ūdī or The Symbolic Expressions of Asadī Concerning the Psalms of David. Also known as the "special edition" of the Merṣād because it includes much of the same material while diminishing the strictly Sufi portion and expanding the section on kingly power.
- Dāya's own Arabic version of the Merṣād, Manārāt al-sā'erin elām'llāh wa maqāmāt al-ṭā'erīn be 'llāh or Light Towers for Those Voyaging to God. and the Stations of Those Plying with God.
- Tafsīr al-Ta'wīlāt al-najmīya, 'Ayn al-ḥayāt, or Baḥr al-ḥaqā'eq.
- A brief allegory in Persian called Resālat al-ṭoyūr or Treatise of the Birds.
- Me'yār al-ṣedq fī meṣdāq al-'ešq or The Criterion of Veracity Concerning the Touchstone of Love.

== Sources ==
- Najmoddin Razi, Merṣād al-ʻebād men al-mabdāʼ elāʼl-maʻād, Edited by Mohammad-Amin Riahi, (first published by Bongahe Tarjome va Nashre Ketab), Tehran, 1973
- Daya, Najm-al-Din in Encyclopaedia Iranica by Mohammad-Amin Riahi
- E.G. Browne. Literary History of Persia. 1998. ISBN 0-7007-0406-X
- Jan Rypka, History of Iranian Literature. Reidel Publishing Company. ASIN B-000-6BXVT-K
