= Jahangir Amouzegar =

Iranian economist, academic and politician

- جهانگير آموزگار
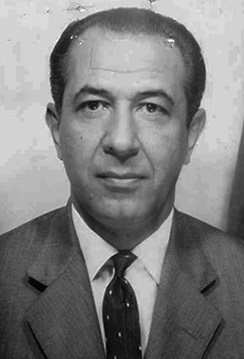

Ambassador-at-large to the International Monetary Fund and World Bank
- In office 1963–1979
- Monarch: Mohammad Reza Pahlavi

Minister of Finance
- In office 26 May 1962 – 19 July 1962
- Prime Minister: Ali Amini

Minister of Commerce
- In office 1 July 1961 – 26 May 1962
- Prime Minister: Ali Amini

Personal details
- Born: 13 January 1920 Tehran, Iran
- Died: 17 January 2018 (aged 98) Washington, D.C., U.S.
- Spouse: Eleanor Horn (m. 1958; died 1997)
- Education: University of Tehran (BSc); University of California, Los Angeles (PhD)
- Occupation: Politician, economist

Jahangir Amouzegar (Persian: جهانگير آموزگار; 13 January 1920 – 17 January 2018) was an Iranian economist, academic and politician.

== Biography ==
Amouzegar was born on 13 January 1920. His father, Abdollah Amouzegar, was a leading lawyer and politician, while his younger brother was Jamshid Amouzegar, who later became Prime Minister of Iran.

Amouzegar received a bachelor's degree in economics from Tehran University. He later pursued graduate studies in the United States and earned a doctorate from the University of California, Los Angeles (UCLA). He served as Iran's minister of commerce and minister of finance from 26 May 1962 to 19 July 1962. He also served as an executive director of the International Monetary Fund.

Amuzegar died on 17 January 2018 in the United States, four days after his 98th birthday.

== Books ==
- Managing the Oil Wealth: Opec's Windfalls and Pitfalls. ISBN 1-86064-648-4
- The Dynamics of the Iranian Revolution: The Pahlavis' Triumph and Tragedy. ISBN 0-7914-0732-2
- The Islamic Republic of Iran: Reflections on an Emerging Economy ISBN 978-1-857-43748-5
