= Nina Ansary =

Iranian–American historian (born 1966)

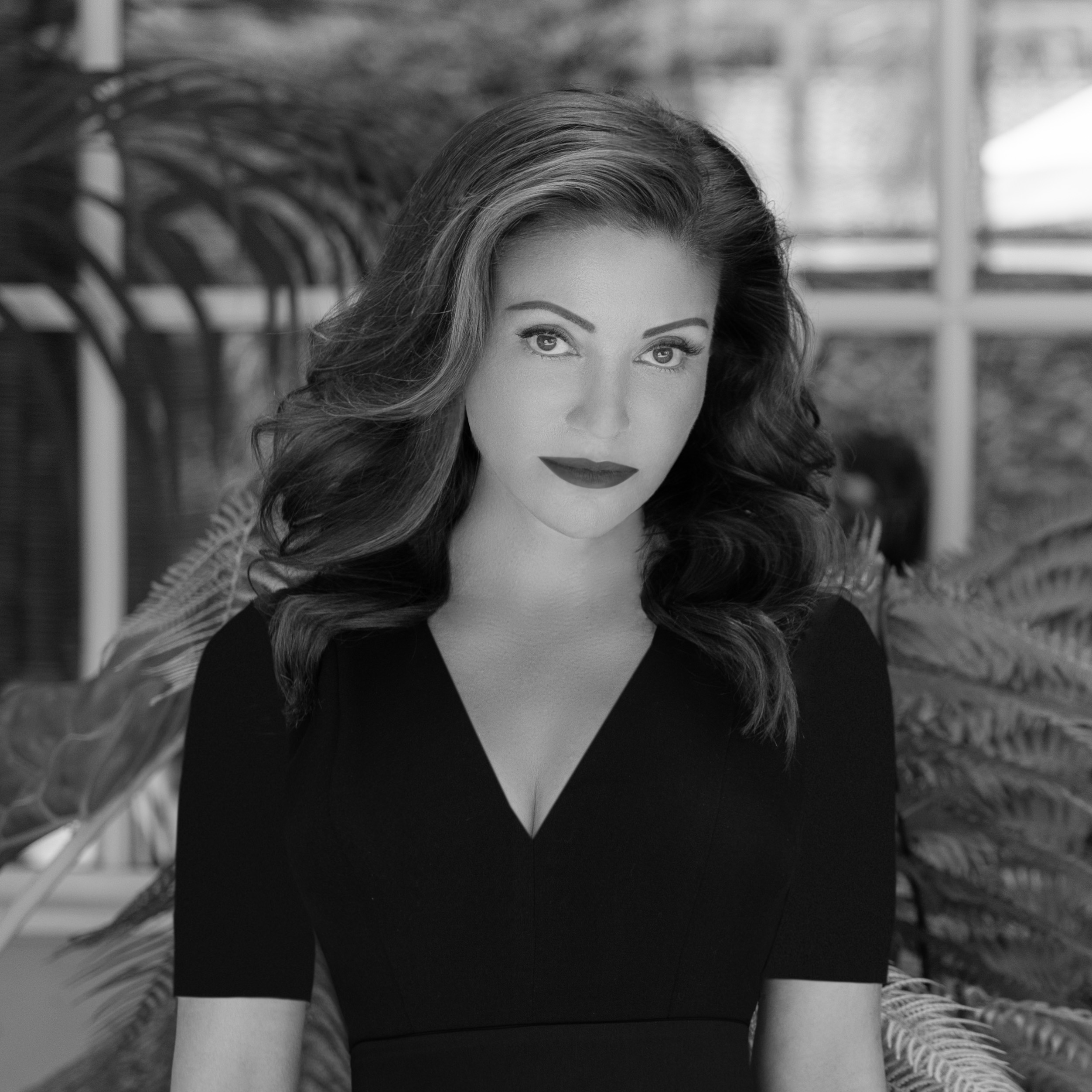
- Born: 1966 (age 59–60); Tehran, Iran
- Education: Barnard College; Columbia University
- Occupations: Historian, writer
- Father: Hushang Ansary
- Relatives: Cyrus A. Ansary (uncle)
- Website: www.ninaansary.com

Nina Ansary (Persian: نینا انصاری, born 1966) is an Iranian–American historian and author best known for her work on women's equity in Iran. Ansary's research seeks to counter conventional assumptions of the progress of women in Iran while advocating for full emancipation. In 2015, Women's eNews recognized Ansary as one of "21 leaders of the 21st century" and in 2019 she received the Ellis Island Medal of Honor.

== Early life and education ==
Ansary was born in Tehran and moved with her family to the United States after the 1979 Revolution in Iran. She spent her teens in New York City and received her bachelor's degree from Barnard College at Columbia University and both her master's degree and doctorate from Columbia University.

== Career ==
In 2013, Ansary's doctoral thesis about the women's movement in Iran produced research that would be discussed in her 2015 book, The Jewels of Allah. After the Islamic republic came to power, it enforced restrictions on women in its Islamic constitution and the Islamic Civil Code. Ansary's research challenged stereotypical assumptions about the lives of women in the policies reflected in these laws. Her book describes accomplishments of women in Iran despite the restrictions; for example, women in Iran outnumber men in higher education.

By 2014, Ansary and her research became increasingly prominent in mainstream media as authoritative on women's issues in Iran. The Daily Beast published Ansary's essays, including analysis of women's rights activists in Iran using modern interpretations of the Koran, in an effort to reverse some of the gender discriminatory laws. Ansary became a regular commentator and wrote widely about the rise of women's literacy in Iran and the renewed publication of post-revolutionary Iran's longest running women's publication Zanan magazine.

In early 2015, Women's eNews named Ansary as one of their "21 leaders of the 21st century" for interrupting legacy narratives and bringing clarity to often misunderstood stereotypes. Ansary wrote that she wanted her work to dispel misconceptions and aid women living in Iran who "continue to fight an uphill battle and demonstrate their resilience." Her work grew to encompass the greater issues around gender inequality. She brought attention to the release of Desert Dancer, a biographical film about Iranian dancer Afshin Ghaffarian. Ansary was included in the 2015 InspireFest in Dublin, Ireland.

In 2016, Marie Claire profiled Ansary as one of 14 privileged women to change the world. Other recognitions include a feature in Angeleno Magazine's "Living Legacies of 2016" and selection as one of "Five Iranian Visionaries You Need to Know" and "6 Women Who Build Bridges Not Walls" by The New York Times. Ansary has appeared on Larry King, The BBC and Fox News and been featured in a variety of top publications, including CNN.com, The Los Angeles Times, and Teen Vogue.

In 2017, Ansary was invited to be a visiting fellow at the London School of Economics Centre for Women, Peace and Security. In 2018, she was appointed as UN Women Champion for Innovation to advance women and girls in Technology and Entrepreneurship. She was also awarded the 2018 Trailblazer Award from Barnard College at Columbia University presented to those who "exemplify the strength, determination, creativity, and courage." In 2019, she received the Ellis Island Medal of Honor.

In 2020, Ansary was appointed as an expert for Women's Media Center (WMC) SheSource. In 2021, The Hill included Ansary in their Changing America article titled "These 10 inspirational women should be household names - here's why they are not" and she presented her work at the Georgetown Institute for Women, Peace, and Security. Ansary began serving as the Director of the World Affairs Councils of America Global Women's Lecture Series. In 2022, she was appointed Director of the Middle East and North Africa Forum Women's Leadership Initiative (WLI) at the University of Cambridge.

== Books ==
=== Jewels of Allah ===
Ansary's book Jewels of Allah: The Untold Story of Women in Iran was published in 2015. The book based on her doctoral thesis written for Columbia University highlights stories of Iranian women pioneers as well as the unanticipated factors leading to a feminist movement within a post-revolutionary patriarchal society. The book received positive reviews; Kirkus Reviews called it "well-documented and persuasively written examination of the change in Iranian women's status" and The New York Times stated that its premise is "both gripping and features a clever thought-provoking twist." The book has also won multiple awards, including the International Book Award for Women's Issues; Eric Hoffer Award for Best Culture Book, Best Book Cover, and Best Debut Author; Indie Book Award for Historical Non-Fiction and Women's Issues; ForeWord IndieFab Award for Women's Studies; and Best Book Award for Women's Issues.

=== Anonymous Is a Woman ===
Her next book, Anonymous Is a Woman: A Global Chronicle of Gender Inequality was published by Revela Press on March 8, 2020. The book explores the roots of institutionalized gender discrimination throughout history. The book received positive reviews; San Francisco Book Review gave the book its highest rating of five stars and said, "...immersing yourself in this book will prove beneficial to your historical knowledge...a learning tool for men and women alike with insightful information galore..."; Foreword Reviews gave it a 5 out of 5 rating and said the book is “Inspiring, compelling, and necessary...an examination of the systems of power that...have silenced women's voices and contributions."; The LSE Book Review said, “Reading this book during the COVID-19 pandemic seems particularly timely...The overarching powerful message of the book is that a diversity of voices and experiences is the central tenet of an inclusive society.”; Smithsonian Magazine included it in “Books of the Week, May 2020”; Buzzfeed called it “17 Brilliant Books That You Won't Struggle to Finish”; The Times Literary Supplement said “With a global economic crisis looming, Ansary's book is a reminder that our responses must be alive to inequalities already at play.”; Teen Vogue Book Club Pick 2020 said “It's about time! This anthology gives female innovators the credit they deserve - all the while exposing the egregious repercussions of inequality.”

In 2021 and 2020, Anonymous Is a Woman received the Next Generation Indie Book Award “Non-Fiction”; Next Generation Indie Book Award “Women's Issues Non-Fiction”; Next Generation Indie Book Award “General Non-Fiction”; Next Generation Indie Book Award “Education/Academic”; IndieReader Discovery Awards “History”; Benjamin Franklin Award “Silver for History”; Benjamin Franklin Award “Gold for Interior Design”; and Foreword Reviews’ 2020 Indies Book of the Year Award “Silver for Women's Issues”.

== Philanthropy ==
Ansary serves on the international advisory board at University of Cambridge Middle East and North Africa Forum (MENAF). She donated the profits from her first book to charities, primarily those that aid disadvantaged girls and women in Iran.

== Awards ==
In 2019, Ansary was the recipient of the Ellis Island Award and was honored by the Iranian American Women Foundation as a "Woman of Influence." In 2020, Ansary received the Columbia University Graduate School of Arts and Sciences Outstanding Alumni Award for "graduates who have advanced not only their academic fields, but the larger world as well."
