= Cyrus A. Ansary =

Iranian-American lawyer and philanthropist (born 1934)

- Born: 1934 (age 91–92); Tehran
- Education: American University; Columbia; University of Paris
- Occupations: Lawyer and Philanthropist

Cyrus A. Ansary (born 1934) is an Iranian-American lawyer, philanthropist, educator, financier and author.

== Life and career ==
Ansary was born in 1934 in Tehran and is the brother of Hushang Ansary. He visited Mt. Vernon, New York in 1950, while attending Alborz High School. Ansary later earned a BS in Economics from American University, a law degree from Columbia and a Certificate in French Civilization from the University of Paris. He served in the U.S. Marines.

He practiced law in the firm of Ansary, Kirkpatrick & Rosse and was Chairman of the Board of JP Morgan Value Opportunities Fund, Inc. He was affiliated with Washington Mutual Investors Fund, Inc. from 1983, and served on the boards of First American Bank of Maryland, Krupp GmbH, Deutsche Babcock and Wilcox. He is the founder and chairman emeritus of Fort Knox National Company. He managed the first sovereign wealth fund in the world to make transnational equity investments.

Ansary has been actively engaged in civic endeavors throughout his career. He served on the Board of Trustees of American University in Washington, D.C., for almost 28 years, including the last nine as Chairman of the Board, and is now Chairman Emeritus. He was a member of the board of trustees of the Krupp Foundation in Essen, Germany. He was also an adjunct professor of corporate finance at American University. Since 1990, the Cyrus A. Ansary Medal has been awarded annually to a civic or corporate leader selected by the American University Board of Trustees.

He has served as a member of the Woodrow Wilson Center for Scholars in Washington, D.C., a trustee of the Washington Opera Society, and a director of the Wolf Trap Foundation in Vienna, Virginia. He was a member of the Life Guard Society of George Washington’s Mount Vernon, and is now an emeritus member.

Ansary has been listed in Who’s Who in America and also Who’s Who in the World for several decades.

He has been a long-term student and admirer of President George Washington and in early 2019 published George Washington: Dealmaker-In-Chief. Ansary is also the author of the memoir Odyssey of High Hopes, published in 2023.

Ansary is the uncle of Nina Ansary.

== Awards ==
Since 1990, the Cyrus Ansary Medal has been awarded annually and is one of the highest volunteer awards given by American University. Recipients include alums, "trustees, volunteers, and community leaders who set high standards for achievement and serve as role models to American University's students and alumni". Recipients have included J. Willard Marriott Jr., Alan L. Meltzer, Kermit A. Washington and Hani M. S. Farsi.

In March 2014, Mount Vernon awarded its first Cyrus A. Ansary Prize for Courage and Character to former president George H. W. Bush. The prize was established in 2012 by Cyrus A. and Janet H. Ansary and, in 2014, came with $75,000 in unrestricted and Mt. Vernon-related monies.

== Books ==
- Ansary, Cyrus A. George Washington, Dealmaker-in-Chief: The Story of How the Father of Our Country Unleashed the Entrepreneurial Spirit in America. Washington, DC: Lambert Publications LLC, 2019. ISBN 978-1-7326879-0-5.
- Ansary, Cyrus A. Odyssey of High Hopes: A Memoir of Adversity and Triumph. Washington, DC: Lambert Publications LLC, 2022. ISBN 978-17326879-3-6.
