= Mohammad Reza Ameli Tehrani =

Deputy Secretary-General of the Rastakhiz Party from 1976 to 1977

- محمدرضا عاملی تهرانی
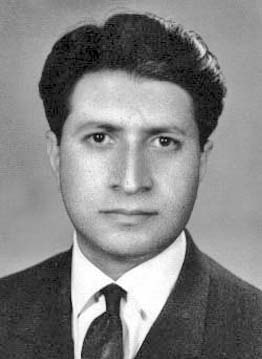

2nd Deputy Secretary-General of the Rastakhiz Party
- In office 28 October 1976 – 7 August 1977
- Secretary-General: Jamshid Amouzegar
- Preceded by: Fereydoun Mahdavi
- Succeeded by: Dariush Homayoon

Minister of Education
- In office 22 November 1978 – 16 January 1979
- Prime Minister: Gholam-Reza Azhari
- Preceded by: Kamal Habibollahi (Acting)
- Succeeded by: Mohammad-Amin Riahi

Minister of Information and Tourism
- In office 16 September 1978 – 6 November 1978
- Prime Minister: Jafar Sharif-Emami
- Preceded by: Daryoush Homayoun
- Succeeded by: Abolhassan Sa'adatmand

Member of the Parliament
- In office 8 September 1975 – 16 September 1978
- Constituency: Tehran
- In office 6 October 1967 – 31 August 1971
- Constituency: Mahabad

Personal details
- Born: 31 December 1927 Tehran, Imperial State of Iran
- Died: 8 May 1979 (aged 51) Tehran, Iran
- Cause of death: Execution by firing squad
- Party: Resurgence Party (1975–1978); Pan-Iranist Party (1947–1975)
- Education: University of Tehran

Mohammad Reza "Ajir" Ameli Tehrani (Persian: محمدرضا عاملی تهرانی; 31 December 1927 – 8 May 1979) was an Iranian physician and pan-Iranist politician who was the Deputy Secretary-General of the Rastakhiz Party during the first tenure of Jamshid Amouzegar. He served as a minister in the cabinets of Jafar Sharif-Emami and Gholam-Reza Azhari. He was sentenced to death by the Revolutionary Court, and subsequently executed on 8 May 1979.

== Early life and education ==
Ameli was born in 1927. He graduated from the University of Tehran's Medical College. Then he completed his residency specializing in anesthesiology. He began working at the university's Medical College faculty.

== Trial and execution ==
The Islamic Revolutionary Tribunal of Tehran found Mohammad Reza Ameli Tehrani, as well as 20 other individuals, "corruptor on earth" and condemned him to death. These 21 persons were executed by a firing squad in Tehran on 8 May 1979.

Party political offices
Preceded by Fereydoun Mahdavi	Deputy Secretary-General of the Resurgence Party; 1976–1977	Succeeded by Dariush Homayoon
