= Jamshid Amouzegar =

Prime Minister of Iran from 1977 to 1978

- جمشید آموزگار
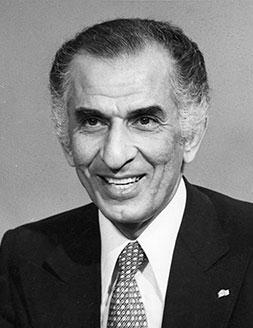
- Amouzegar in 1977

Prime Minister of Iran
- In office 7 August 1977 – 27 August 1978
- Monarch: Mohammad Reza Shah
- Preceded by: Amir-Abbas Hoveyda
- Succeeded by: Jafar Sharif-Emami

2nd & 4th Secretary-General of the Rastakhiz Party
- In office 20 January 1978 – 27 August 1978
- Deputy: Javad Saeed
- Preceded by: Mohammad Baheri
- Succeeded by: Javad Saeed
- In office 28 October 1976 – 7 August 1977
- Deputy: Mohammad Reza Ameli Tehrani
- Preceded by: Amir-Abbas Hoveyda
- Succeeded by: Mohammad Baheri

Minister of Interior
- In office 1 March 1974 – 7 August 1977
- Prime Minister: Amir-Abbas Hoveyda
- Preceded by: Kamal Hassani
- Succeeded by: Asadollah Nasr Esfahani

Minister of Finance
- In office 1 February 1965 – 1 March 1974
- Prime Minister: Amir-Abbas Hoveyda
- Preceded by: Amir-Abbas Hoveyda
- Succeeded by: Hushang Ansary

Personal details
- Born: 25 June 1923 Tehran, Iran
- Died: 27 September 2016 (aged 93) Rockville, Maryland, U.S.
- Party: Rastakhiz Party (1975–1978)
- Spouse: Ulrike Schulz (m. 1950; died 2004)
- Relatives: Jahangir Amouzegar (brother)
- Education: University of Tehran (BSc); Cornell University (MEng, PhD)
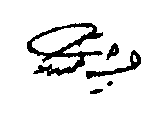
- Signature

Jamshid Amouzegar (Persian: جمشید آموزگار; 25 June 1923 – 27 September 2016) was an Iranian politician who was the prime minister of Iran from 7 August 1977 until his resignation on 27 August 1978. He was the second and fourth Secretary-General of the Rastakhiz Party from 1976 to 1977 and in 1978. Prior to that, he served as the minister of interior and minister of finance in the cabinet of Amir-Abbas Hoveyda.

== Early life and education ==
Amouzegar was born on 25 June 1923 in Tehran. His father, Abdollah, was a historian and lawyer who served in the Supreme Court of Iran. He had three brothers, Jahangir, Kuros, and Hooshang, all of whom later held prominent positions in the Imperial Iranian government.

Amouzegar graduated from the University of Tehran with degrees in engineering and law. While studying in the United States, he earned a master's degree in civil engineering in 1947 and a doctorate from Cornell University in 1951, with a focus in hydraulics.

== Career ==
=== Government positions ===
Amouzegar served as deputy minister in Iran's ministry of health under Jahanshah Saleh in 1955.

In 1959, Amouzegar replaced Hassan Akhavi as agriculture minister when Akhavi was removed from the cabinet of Prime Minister Manouchehr Eghbal. He was appointed minister of labor and then minister of health in the cabinet led by Prime Minister Hassan-ali Mansour. He subsequently became minister of finance in the cabinet of Amir Abbas Hoveyda after the assassination of Prime Minister Mansour in 1964, remaining in that post for nine years.

From 1965 to 1974, he headed several ordinary meetings of the OPEC. In 1971, he and Saudi Oil Minister Ahmed Zaki Yamani were instrumental in implementing the series of price hikes that ultimately quadrupled the price of oil and provided the resources for Iran to modernize its infrastructure, agriculture, and defense. For this accomplishment, Amouzegar was awarded the Taj-e Iran, first-class, an honor normally reserved for only the prime minister and former prime ministers. He was appointed minister of interior in 1974.

==== 1975 hostage crisis ====
On 21 December 1975, Amouzegar was taken hostage along with Yamani and other oil ministers in attendance by the Venezuelan terrorist Carlos the Jackal during an OPEC meeting in Vienna. Carlos was ordered to execute both Amouzegar and Yamani but did not do so, and Amouzegar was released along with the other hostages after two days. Carlos flew him and a Saudi to Algeria, where they were released.

=== Prime Minister of Iran ===
In 1977, Amouzegar became chairman of the Rastakhiz Party (Resurrection), having led the progressive faction against finance minister Hushang Ansary's liberal constructionist faction. Soon after Jimmy Carter became president of the United States, Amouzegar was appointed Prime Minister of Iran on 7 August 1977, succeeding Amir Abbas Hoveyda in the post.

Amouzegar soon became unpopular as he attempted to slow the overheated economy with measures that, although generally thought necessary, triggered a downturn in employment and private sector profits that would later compound the government's problems. On 27 August 1978, amid growing turbulence in the country, he resigned, and was replaced by Jafar Sharif-Emami.

== Later life and death ==
After leaving Iran in 1978 amid the Iranian Revolution, Amouzegar settled in Chevy Chase, Maryland. He served as an independent consultant to the governments of Saudi Arabia and Kuwait.

Amouzegar was married to Ulrike Schulz, who was German, until her death in 2004. The couple had met while studying in the United States. He died in Rockville, Maryland on 27 September 2016, at the age of 93.

== Sources ==
- Media related to Jamshid Amouzegar at Wikimedia Commons
- 'Alí Rizā Awsatí. Iran in the Past Three Centuries (Irān dar Se Qarn-e Goz̲ashteh) - Volume 2 (Paktāb Publishing, Tehran, Iran, 2003). ISBN 964-93406-5-3.
- Qajar (Kadjar) Orders and Decorations

Political offices
| Preceded by Amir-Abbas Hoveyda | Minister of Finance; 1965–1974 | Succeeded by Hushang Ansary |
| Preceded by Kamal Hassani | Minister of Interior; 1974–1977 | Succeeded by Gholam Reza Azhari |
| Preceded by Amir-Abbas Hoveyda | Prime Minister of Iran; 1977–1978 | Succeeded by Jafar Sharif-Emami |
Party political offices
| Preceded by Amir-Abbas Hoveyda | Secretary-General of the Resurgence Party; 1976–1977; 1978 | Succeeded by Mohammad Baheri |
| Preceded by Mohammad Baheri | Secretary-General of the Resurgence Party; 1976–1977; 1978 | Succeeded by Javad Saeed |
