= Pan-Iranist Party =

Pan-Iranist Party حزب پان‌ایرانیست Ḥezb-e Pān-Irānist
- General Secretary: Dr. Sohrab Azam Zangane
- Spokesperson: Manouchehr Yazdi
- Founder: Mohsen Pezeshkpour; Dariush Forouhar
- Founded: 1941; 85 years ago
- Headquarters: Tehran, Iran
- Parliamentary wing: Pan-Iranist parliamentary group (1967–71; 1978–79)
- Ideology: Pan-Iranism; Iranian nationalism State secularism Historical: Expansionist nationalism Ultranationalism; Chauvinism; Irredentism
- Political position: Right-wing; Historical: Far-right
- Colours: Green White Red; Grey (customary)
- Seats in the Parliament: 0 / 290

Election symbol
- ≠

Party flag

Website
- paniranist.org

The Pan-Iranist Party (Persian: حزب پان‌ایرانیست, romanized: Ḥezb-e Pān-Irānist) is an opposition party in Iran advocating for pan-Iranism. The party is not registered and is technically banned, yet continues to operate inside Iran.

During the Pahlavi era, the party was represented in the Parliament and considered a semi-opposition, allowed to operate until officially denouncing Iran's assent to Bahraini independence in 1971. It is an occasional supporter of the National Front, a major nationalist party, and was itself nationalist with respect to its ideology. The Pan-Iranist Party was an anti-communist organization, and regularly battled supporters of the Tudeh Party of Iran in the streets of Tehran. In the context of the 1940s, it is described as a "secular ultranationalist party", whereas in that of the mid-1960s, it is described as a "secular nationalist" party. Nowadays, the party is defined by opposition to the pan-Islamism of the post-1979 Iranian government, as well as opposition to Islam's influence on Iranian culture. Unlike pan-Arabist and pan-Turkist parties in the region, the Pan-Iranist Party currently does not advocate the return of Iran's former lands through irredentist and revanchist plans, advocating instead for the cultural integration of citizens with a shared Iranian cultural heritage.

The Pan-Iranist Party was supportive of the Iranian Green Movement in 2009, and was cited by some as an influence on Iranian Principlist positions amidst growing Iran–Saudi tensions.

== Background ==
The invasion of Iran by Anglo-Soviet armies in the early 20th century led to insecurity among Iranians who saw the king, Reza Shah Pahlavi, as powerless against such foreign presence in the country. Soldiers from Russia, the United Kingdom, India, New Zealand, Australia and later on, the United States, were stationed in Iran, especially in the capital, Tehran.

The Anglo-Soviet invasion of Iran influenced a series of student movements in 1941, including the underground nationalist guerrilla group called the Revenge group (also known as the Anjoman). The Pan-Iranist Party was later founded by two members of the group, as well as two other students in the mid-to-late 1940s in Tehran University. Though the pan-Iranist movement had been active throughout the 1930s, it had been a loosely organized grass roots alliance of nationalist writers, teachers, students, and activists. The party was the first organization to officially adopt the pan-Iranist position, which believed in the solidarity and reunification of the Iranian peoples inhabiting the Iranian plateau.

== History ==
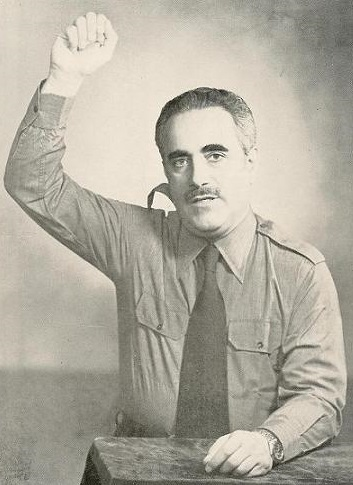
Mohsen Pezeshkpour, the party's co-founder and leader from 1967 to 1997, represented Khorramshahr in the parliament between 1967 and 1971. He was an MP from 1975 to 1979 with Rastakhiz ticket.

In 1951, Mohsen Pezeshkpour and Dariush Forouhar came to a disagreement as to how the party should operate, resulting in a split in the party. The Pezeskpour faction, which retained the party name, believed in working within the system of Mohammad Reza Pahlavi. The Forouhar faction, which adopted a new name, Mellat Iran (Nation of Iran Party), believed in working against the system. Mellat Iran was far more fervently nationalist than the former party, and allied itself with the national movement of Mohammad Mossadegh, who had founded the National Front of Iran (Jebhe Melli) with other Iranian nationalist leaders.

The party was allegedly funded by the Central Intelligence Agency through TPBEDAMN.

After the British-American sponsored coup d'etat against Mossadegh, the Shah assumed dictatorial powers and outlawed almost all political groups, including Mellat Iran and the National Front. The Pan-Iranist Party soon became the official opposition in the Majlis, with Pezeshkpour as Speaker. However, in reality, the party had very little political power and influence, and its position was primarily intended to be symbolic. Beginning in the late 1960s, under the government of Amir Abbas Hoveyda, Iran became a one-party dictatorship under the Imperial Resurrection Party (Rastakhiz).

Pezeshkpour remained active in the Majlis, and denounced British rule in Bahrain, which Iran claimed. He established a residence in the city of Khorramshahr, which at the time contained some of Iran's most exclusive neighbourhoods, which he went on to use as his base of operations. In Khuzestan, the party was able to influence local politics, despite being largely irrelevant elsewhere.

With the onset of revolution in 1978, Pezeshkpour and other politicians allied with the Shah fled the country into exile. Mohammad Reza Ameli Tehrani, a party co-founder, was sentenced to death by the Revolutionary Court and subsequently executed in May 1979. Nationalist movements opposed to the Shah, such as Mellat Iran and the National Front, remained in the country, and played a crucial role in the revolutionary provisional government of Mehdi Bazargan. After the Islamic Revolution of 1979, which eventually saw the rise of Ruhollah Khomeini to the position of Supreme Leader and the collapse of the provisional government, all nationalist groups, along with socialist and communist movements such as the Tudeh Party, were banned.

In the early 1990s, Pezeshkpour wrote a letter of apology to the new Supreme Leader, Ali Khamenei, stating that he wished to return to Iran and promised to stay out of politics for good. Khamenei accepted the apology, and allowed Pezeshkpour to return under the condition that he not resume his previous political activities. However, some time afterwards, Pezeshkpour became active in politics once again, and reestablished the Pan-Iranist Party in Iran. He reformed the party structure, abandoning much of the old organizational ideology that caused his prior split with Forouhar. Despite this, the Pan-Iranist Party and Mellat Iran did not reconcile, and continued to function as separate organizations.

In the wake of the student demonstrations of 1999, many members of the Pan-Iranist Party were arrested and nine members of the party leadership, including Pezeshkpour himself, were summoned to the Islamic Revolutionary Court. The charges made against them included distribution of anti-government propaganda in the official party newspaper, National Sovereignty.

In the summer of 2004, an attempt by a motorist, alleged to be an undercover operative of the Ministry of Intelligence, to assassinate Mohsen Pezeshkpour failed in front of his residence in Tehran.

Following Pezeshkpour's death under house arrest on 6 January 2000, Reza Kermani was declared the new General Secretary of the Pan Iranist Party. Kermani himself died on 30 January 2013, following 18 months of internment in Gohardasht Prison, known for holding Iranian political prisoners and criticized by some for poor conditions.

== Organization ==
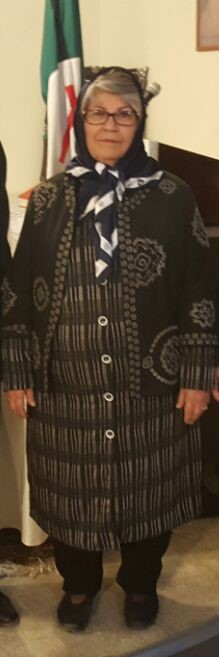
Zahra Gholamipour, former Secretary-General from 2006 to 2018

The differences between Forouhar and Pezeshkpour lay mostly in organizational structure and policy, though there were also specific ideological differences. Forouhar strongly believed in democracy and cooperation with other Iranian parties, including leftist-oriented groups, whereas Pezeshkpour believed in a more authoritarian approach and opposed alliances with non-nationalist organizations. However, alliances with other nationalist groups were rare or non-existent as most were officially banned. Under Pezeshkpour, the Pan-Iranist Party also took on a paramilitary structure, with members assigned military ranks and titles. All male and female active members wore uniforms to party functions. Forouhar also strongly opposed this, though this paramilitary nature was largely symbolic, and party members did not carry weapons. Ordinary members were not required to wear uniforms. Beginning in the late 1960s, Pezeshkpour also had several personal bodyguards assigned to protect him.

The party's symbol was a crossed-out equal sign (≠), signifying the Pan-Iranist view that Iran's relationship with major powers was unequal, and that Iran must uphold its national sovereignty and interests above all else. According to the party's literature, the symbol also signified the belief that this inequality extended to all nations, and that each nation must struggle to secure its own interest at the expense of others. Disputes regarding symbolism and philosophy also played a crucial role in dividing Forouhar and Pezeshkpour.

Other nationalists often criticized Pezeshkpour for not supporting Mossadegh, and for his role in Shah's government as Speaker of Majlis, as this position had no real power. Nationalist leaders viewed the failure of his opposition to the separation of Bahrain as evidence that his function was strictly symbolic.

When Pezeshkpour set about restoring the party after returning to Iran, he and other former party leaders renounced the former paramilitary and authoritarian structure of the organization. Instead, they proclaimined a commitment to plurality, democracy, and a willingness to cooperate with other opposition groups. The modern Pan-Iranist Party continues to maintain the original party symbolism.

== Election results ==
| Year | Election | Party leader | Seats won |
|---|---|---|---|
| 1967 | Parliamentary | Mohsen Pezeshkpour | 5 / 219 (2%) |
| 1968 | Local | Mohsen Pezeshkpour | 20 / 1,068 (2%) |

== See also ==
- Conservatism in Iran
- Iranians' Party
- Monarchism in Iran
- Nation Party of Iran
