= Pan-Iranism =

Political ideology emphasising unity of Iranian peoples

Pan-Iranism (Persian: پان‌ایرانیسم) is a nationalist ideology that espouses the necessity of socio-cultural intimacy between all Iranian peoples.

According to the Routledge Handbook of Persian Gulf Politics:

"One important point distinguishing the radical nationalism of pan-Iranism from pan-Arab or pan-Turk orientations in the region is the fact that the Iranian version currently does not seem to include irredentist plans in its political program. Rather than demanding the return the lands separated from Iran in the past, such as Afghanistan, Tajikistan, the Republic of Azerbaijan, Bahrain, or the Kurdish areas of Iraq and Turkey, the Pan-Iranist Party emphasizes the cultural integration of the Iranian civilizational basin."

However, there are some streams of this form of pan-nationalism that promote irredentist views and ambitions, namely by demanding the territorial unification of all Iranian-inhabited lands in West Asia, the Caucasus, Central Asia, and South Asia. More specifically, radical pan-Iranists typically take the view that the historic boundaries of Iran, such as those of the ancient Achaemenid Empire, must be revived to the extent where Iranian peoples are brought closer together under one state.

== Origins and ideology ==
Flag of the Pan-Iranist Party

Iranian political scientist Mahmoud Afshar developed the Pan-Iranist ideology in the early 1920s in opposition to Pan-Turkism and Pan-Arabism, which were seen as potential threats to the territorial integrity of Iran. He also displayed a strong belief in the nationalist character of Iranian people throughout the country's long history.

On the eve of World War I, pan-Turkists focused on the Turkic-speaking lands of Iran, Caucasus and Central Asia. The ultimate purpose was to persuade these populations to secede from the larger political entities to which they belonged and join the new pan-Turkic homeland. It was the latter appeal to Iranian Azerbaijanis, which, contrary to Pan-Turkist intentions, caused a small group of Azerbaijani intellectuals to become the strongest advocates of the territorial integrity of Iran. After the constitutional revolution in Iran, a romantic nationalism was adopted by Azerbaijani Democrats as a reaction to the pan-Turkist irredentist policies threatening Iran's territorial integrity. It was during this period that Iranism and linguistic homogenization policies were proposed as a defensive nature against all others. Contrary to what one might expect, foremost among innovating this defensive nationalism were Iranian Azerbaijanis. They viewed that assuring the territorial integrity of the country was the first step in building a society based on law and a modern state. Through this framework, their political loyalty outweighed their ethnic and regional affiliations. The adoption of these integrationist policies paved the way for the emergence of the titular ethnic group's cultural nationalism.

Geographically and culturally, Greater Iran is generally acknowledged to include the entire Iranian plateau and its bordering plains, extending from Mesopotamia and the South Caucasus in the west, to the Indus River in the east, and from the Oxus River in the north to the Persian Gulf and Sea of Oman in the south.

== History ==
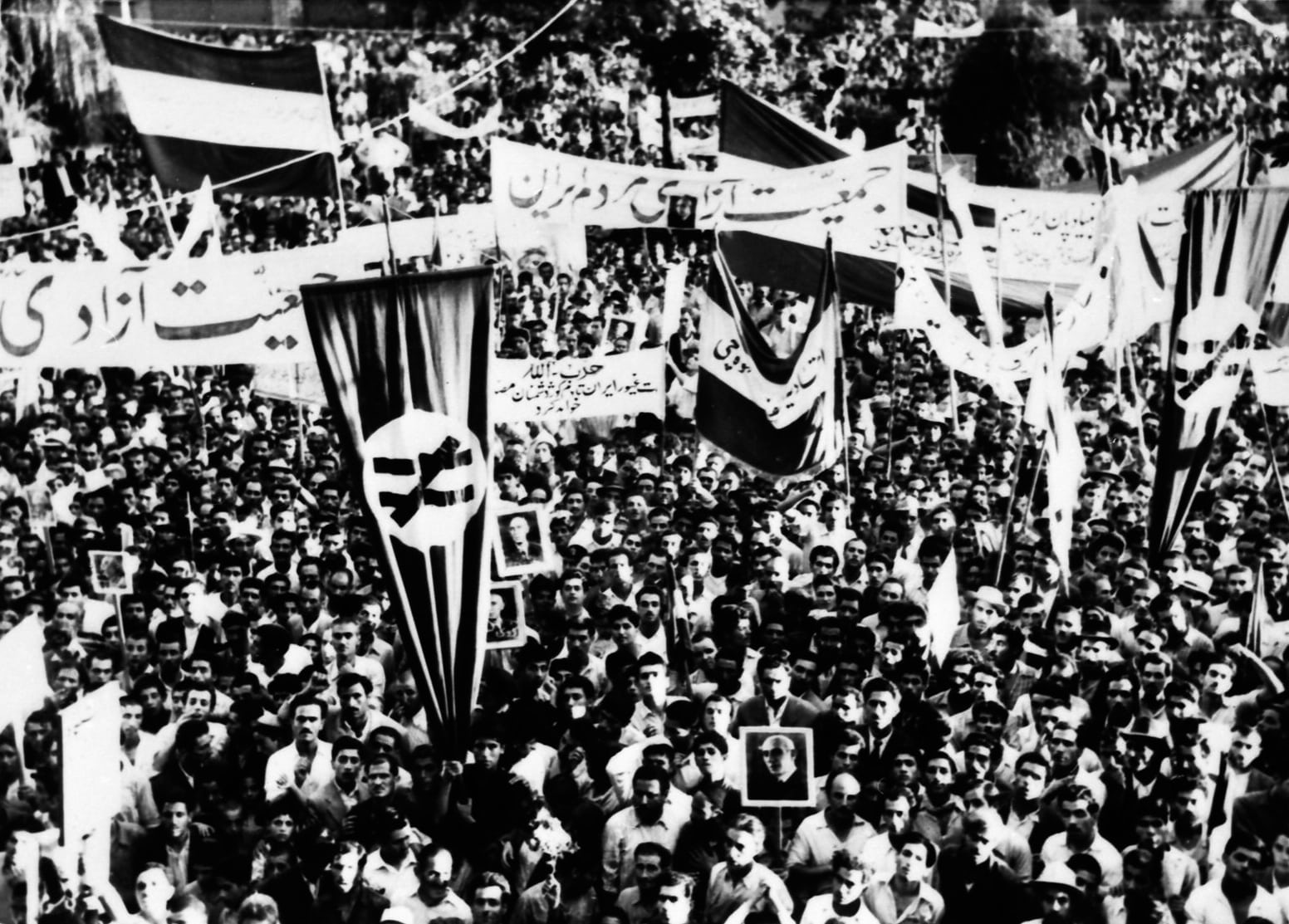
Pan-Iranist flags seen during Pro-Mosaddegh rallies in Tehran on 16 August 1953

With the collapse of the Qajar dynasty, which had descended into corruption, and the rise of Reza Shah Pahlavi in 1925, who began introducing secular reforms limiting the power of the Shia clergy, Iranian nationalist and socialist thinkers had hoped that this new era would also witness the introduction of democratic reforms. However, such reforms did not take place. This culminated in the gradual rise of a loosely organized grass roots Pan-Iranist movement made up of nationalist writers, teachers, students, and activists allied with other pro-democracy movements.

In the 1940s, following the Anglo-Soviet invasion of Iran, the Pan-Iranist movement gained momentum and popularity as a result of the widespread feeling of insecurity among Iranians who saw the king, Reza Shah, powerless against such foreign presence in the country. There were soldiers from Russia, England, India, New Zealand, Australia and later on, America, present in the country, especially in the capital, Tehran. The Allied occupation influenced a series of student movements in 1941. One of these new groups was an underground nationalist guerrilla group called the Revenge group, also known as the Anjoman. The Pan-Iranist Party was founded later on by two of the members of the Revenge group and two other students in the mid-to-late 1940s in Tehran University. Though the pan-Iranist movement had been active throughout the 1930s, it had been a loosely organized grass roots alliance of nationalist writers, teachers, students, and activists. The party was the first organization to officially adopt the pan-Iranist position, which believed in the solidarity and reunification of the Iranian peoples inhabiting the Iranian plateau. In 1951, the party leaders Mohsen Pezeshkpour and Dariush Forouhar came to a disagreement as to how the party should operate, and a division occurred. The two factions greatly differed in their organizational structure and practice. The Pezeskpour faction, which retained the party name, believed in working within the system of Mohammad Reza Pahlavi. The Forouhar faction, which adopted a new name, Mellat Iran (Nation of Iran Party), believed in working against the system.

== Iran-e Bozorg ==
Persian: ایران بزرگ, romanized: Irān-e Bozorg, lit. 'Great Iran' was the name periodical published in the city of Rasht by the Armenian political activist Gregory Yeghikian (Armenian: Գրիգոր Եղիկյան). It advocated the unification of Iranian peoples (e.g., Afghans, Kurds, etc.) including the Armenians. Yaqikiān believed that, with education and the rising of the levels of people's awareness, such a goal was feasible through peaceful means. The journal benefited from the contributions of a number of leading intellectuals of the time, including Moḥammad Moʿin and ʿAli Esfandiāri (Nimā Yušij), and carried articles, poetry, a serialized story, and some news. It also published articles in support of the Kurds who had risen in rebellion in Turkey, which caused the protest of the Turkish counsel in Rasht and led to the banning of the paper by the order of the minister of court. Yaqikiān tried, without success, to have the ban removed and eventually moved to Tehran, where he published the paper Irān-e Konuni.

== Pan-Iranist organizations ==
=== Iran ===
| Organization | Founding year | Parliament (only for political parties) |
|---|---|---|
| Pan-Iranist Party | 1941 | 1967: 5 / 219 1968: 20 / 1,068 |
| Aria Party | 1946 | —N/a |
| Nation Party of Iran | 1951 | 1979: 0 / 73 1980: 0 / 290 |
| SUMKA | 1952 | —N/a |

Tajikistan

| Organization | Founding year | Parliament (only for political parties) |
|---|---|---|
| Democratic Party | 1990 | 2015: 1 / 63 2020: 1 / 63 |

== See also ==
- Greater Iran
- History of Iran
- Iranian languages
- Iranian nationalism
- Iranian peoples
- List of ancient Iranian peoples
- Persian Empire
- Persianization
