= Rastakhiz Party =

Ruling party of Iran (1975–1978)

Resurrection Party of the Iranian Nation حزب رستاخیز ملت ایران Hezb-e Rastākhiz-e Mellat-e Irān
- Official logo (Note: Logo featuring 'Resurrection Party of People of Iran' (centre), 'Constitution' (top left), 'Shah–People Revolution' (below), 'Imperial System' (top right) writings in Persian.)
- Founder: Mohammad Reza Pahlavi
- Founded: 2 March 1975; 51 years ago
- Dissolved: 1 October 1978; 48 years ago
- Merger of: See full list: Iranians' Party; New Iran Party; People's Party; Pan-Iranist Party
- Headquarters: Central Tehran, Iran (Note: The headquarters of the Rastakhiz Party were located in central Tehran near Imam Khomeini Square (then known as Sepah or Toopkhaneh Square). The party's administrative building was completed in the late Pahlavi period and after the Iranian Revolution became part of the complex used by the Ministry of Interior.)
- Membership: approx. 5 million (1976 est.)
- Ideology: Pahlavism
- Colours: Green White Red
- Slogan: "Shah, Homeland, Party"
- Anthem: "Time of Resurrection"

The Resurrection Party of the Iranian Nation, (Note: The word رستاخیز literally means "rising again" or "revival." Depending on context, translators sometimes render it as: resurrection, revival, resurgence, or awakening.) (Note: Persian: حزب رستاخیز ملت ایران, lit. '"The Iranian Nation's Awakening"') simply known as the Rastakhiz Party, (Note: Persian: حزب رستاخیز, romanized: Hezb-e Rastāxiz, lit. 'Resurgence/Resurrection Party') was Iran's sole legal and ruling political party from 2 March 1975 until its dissolution amid the Iranian Revolution on 1 October 1978. The party was founded by Mohammad Reza Pahlavi, the last Shah of Iran, who was the party's de facto leader. (Note: Although the Secretary-General was the official leader, Mohammad Reza Pahlavi was the one who held actual power within the Rastakhiz Party, making him the party's de facto leader.)

Although the Rastakhiz Party was presented as a vehicle for national political participation, it operated within a highly centralized political structure closely connected to the state. Membership was strongly encouraged and in many cases effectively required, particularly for government employees and professionals. Despite official claims of millions of members, historians have noted that the organization functioned largely as an extension of the state apparatus rather than as an independent political movement.

During the political unrest that preceded the Iranian Revolution, the party became a frequent target of criticism and protest. As demonstrations intensified in 1978, the Shah dissolved the Rastakhiz Party as part of broader attempts to ease political tensions. The collapse of the monarchy in 1979 led to the suppression of monarchist political organizations, and the party ceased to exist with the establishment of the Islamic Republic of Iran. The Islamic Republican Party succeeded the Rastakhiz Party in 1980.

== Background ==
Prior to the establishment of the Rastakhiz Party, Mohammad Reza Pahlavi, Shah of Iran, had publicly rejected the idea of creating a single-party system in Iran. In his 1961 book Mission for My Country, he wrote:

If I were a dictator rather than a constitutional monarch, I would try to take over the leadership of a single, dominant party, like Hitler or what you see in socialist (communist) countries today. [...] As the king of a constitutional country, I see no reason not to encourage the formation of political parties and, like dictators, to support a puppet party.

Despite these earlier statements, the political environment in Iran changed considerably during the following decade. During the late 1960s and early 1970s, the Pahlavi state oversaw a period of rapid economic expansion associated with the development programs of the White Revolution. The sharp rise in global oil prices following the 1973 oil crisis greatly increased Iran’s oil revenues and significantly expanded the Iranian state's financial resources. These developments enabled the Imperial government to fund large-scale industrial projects, infrastructure programs, and the expansion of the state bureaucracy and security apparatus.

At the same time, the political system remained highly centralized around the monarchy. Since the early 1960s, Iran had operated under a limited two-party framework dominated by the pro-government New Iran Party and the People’s Party. These parties functioned largely within the political structure of the Pahlavi state and were widely regarded as lacking genuine political competition. By the mid-1970s, the Shah concluded that the existing arrangement was ineffective and that a unified political organization could more effectively mobilize support for the monarchy and the reform program of the White Revolution. This shift in political strategy led to the creation of the Rastakhiz Party in March 1975, which replaced the existing party structure with a single national political organization aligned with the state.

Some commentators have argued that the Shah's decision to create a single-party system conflicted with constitutional principles. According to a BBC Persian analysis, the establishment of the Rastakhiz Party contradicted Article 21 of the 1906 Constitution, which formally guaranteed political association. The article notes that although the Shah frequently invoked the constitution as a source of legitimacy, critics accused him of disregarding provisions related to political rights and democratic participation.

== History ==
The party was formed through the merger of several pro-government political organizations, including the Iranians' Party, the New Iran Party, the People's Party, and the Pan-Iranist Party. Founded under the government of Prime Minister Amir Abbas Hoveyda, the party has been blamed by some for contributing to the overthrow of the Pahlavi monarchy by antagonizing formerly apolitical Iranians with its compulsory membership and dues (taxes), and general interference in the political, economic, and religious concerns of people's lives.

Along with the party, a youth wing—Rastakhiz Youth—was established, which Hoveyda referred to as "the instrument of Iran's development". Through this youth wing and a special task force of the party, Rastakhiz embarked upon a large-scale anti-profiteering campaign directed against the bazaari merchants, who were soon identified as "enemies of the state". In October 1975, the Shah, referring to this campaign as a "cultural movement", decreed that anti-profiteerism be made the fourteenth principle of the White Revolution. The single-party system ended in late 1978 as the Iranian Revolution gained ground.

When announcing the creation of the Rastakhiz Party, the Shah declared that citizens who rejected the party’s principles should either join the organization or leave the country. He stated:

Anyone who does not join this political organization and does not believe in the three principles I mentioned has two options: either he is a person who belongs to an illegal organization, which is what we call a "mass." That is, again, what we call a "mass" and with the power of proof: a stateless person. He should either be in an Iranian prison or, if he wants to, he can leave tomorrow willingly, without paying any fees, with a passport in his hand, because he is not Iranian, it is illegal, and the law has determined his punishment. A person who is not a mass and is not a stateless person but does not share this trend is free, provided that he says—provided that he says openly, officially, and without any veil—that I do not agree with this trend, but I am not anti-patriotic either. We have nothing to do with him.

— Quoted in Negin magazine (March 1974, no. 118) and Jalal Rafi, Information: 80 Years, vol. 1, p. 296.

Following the announcement, the Shah emphasized that the new organization was intended to unify Iranian political life around the principles of the constitutional monarchy and the reforms of the White Revolution. According to his public statements at the time, the party was envisioned as a mechanism through which citizens could participate in political life while supporting the monarchy's modernization program.

In a 1975 interview, Mohammad Reza Pahlavi discussed the establishment of Iran’s one-party system under the Rastakhiz Party, stating that it was intended to suit the country’s specific political and social conditions. He suggested that the system reflected widespread public participation and presented it as an alternative to multi-party models used in other countries.

But I think that we have just taken what is good for this country. And I even sometimes wonder if this multi-party system is good for those who have it elsewhere. But for us, it seems that what we have done now is the best because, as I said, just go in the streets and question anybody, you will see the whole country has joined the movement.

— Mohammad Reza Pahlavi

=== Dissolution ===
In January 1978, the Iranian Revolution began. As the sole legal political party and a central component of the Shah’s political system, the Rastakhiz Party became a frequent target during the unrest. Party offices were attacked, and some party officials were assaulted in several cities. At the same time, the party, under the leadership of Jafarian, organized counter-demonstrations in support of the Shah and attempted to mobilize industrial workers in response to opposition activity among bazaar merchants.

Party publications and media outlets promoted the government’s position during the growing political crisis. Despite these efforts, the party failed to develop a large-scale pro-government movement. Contemporary observers and later historians have noted that the organization functioned largely within the framework of the state apparatus rather than as an independent political movement. On 2 October 1978, the government announced the dissolution of the Rastakhiz Party. The authorities hoped that the decision would help reduce political tensions, but protests continued.

On 25 October, residents of Rasht stormed the headquarters of SAVAK and the Rastakhiz Party. The following day, in Khorramabad, a member of the secret police was killed, and several others were wounded. Following the revolution's victory in February 1979, several former Rastakhiz officials were arrested. Amir-Abbas Hoveyda, Mahmoud Jafarian, Javad Saeed, and Mohammad Reza Ameli-Tehrani were later executed after being sentenced by the Islamic Revolutionary Court under the leadership of Sadegh Khalkhali.

== Ideology ==
The Rastakhiz Party was created as a political instrument intended to consolidate support for the Pahlavi dynasty and the modernization policies associated with the White Revolution. Its official doctrine emphasized loyalty to the monarchy, national unity, and secular governance within the framework of the Iranian constitutional system. Core themes of the party included monarchism, secularism, populism, and strong anti-communism. These positions reflected the broader political orientation of the Pahlavi state, which sought to promote rapid economic modernization while suppressing both Marxist and Islamist opposition movements.

Some historians have described the party's ideological framework as eclectic and largely state-directed rather than doctrinally coherent. According to Gholam Reza Afkhami, early discussions surrounding the creation of the party included references to corporatist organizational models used by certain European authoritarian regimes, although these ideas were ultimately not implemented.

In practice, the party functioned through a highly centralized political structure in which policy direction flowed from the leadership and ultimately from the Shah himself. Scholars have compared aspects of this internal structure to forms of democratic centralism, although the term was not formally adopted by the party.

Front page for the official party charter

=== Persian nationalism ===
State nationalism during the reign of Mohammad Reza Shah (1941–1979) emphasized the Persian language, territorial unity, and loyalty to the monarchy as central elements of Iranian national identity. Persian was promoted as the dominant language of administration, education, and public life, and was widely framed by the state as a symbol of national cohesion. The Pahlavi government also drew heavily on pre-Islamic historical imagery in its nationalist discourse. Official cultural initiatives frequently highlighted ancient Persian civilization and figures such as Cyrus the Great, while symbols associated with Zoroastrianism were invoked to emphasize continuity between modern Iran and its pre-Islamic past.

Although the state promoted a unified national identity, Iran remained a multiethnic society. Scholars have noted that the emphasis on Persian language and culture contributed to the development of a Persian-centered conception of Iranian national identity. According to Alex Shams, the Pahlavi state drew on Aryanist narratives and pre-Islamic symbolism to frame Persian identity as central to the Iranian nation-state. These themes of national unity, modernization, and loyalty to the monarchy were reflected in the political ideology of the Rastakhiz Party, which the Shah presented as a vehicle for mobilizing society around the goals of the White Revolution and strengthening national cohesion under the Pahlavi state.

=== Principles ===
The Rastakhiz Party was officially founded upon three core principles that members were expected to uphold: loyalty to the Pahlavi monarchy, adherence to the Persian Constitution of 1906, and support for the reforms of the White Revolution, often referred to as the "Shah and People Revolution". These principles were presented by the government as the ideological foundation for national unity and political participation within the framework of the monarchy.

=== Factions ===
Although the party was officially presented as a unified national movement, it contained several internal factions representing different political tendencies among the pro-government elite. Two principal factions emerged within the organization: the Progressive faction associated with Jamshid Amouzegar and the Constructive faction associated with Hushang Ansary. These factions were intended to represent differing policy approaches while remaining loyal to the party's core principles and the authority of the Shah. In 1978, a liberal-oriented faction reportedly emerged under the leadership of Hushang Nahavandi, seeking to introduce limited internal debate on political and economic policy. Around the same time, an intellectual circle known as the "Iran Issues Study Group," associated with Cyrus Nahavandi, reportedly sought recognition as an additional faction within the party and published internal studies examining the party’s political performance and organizational weaknesses.

== Organization ==
The Rastakhiz Party operated through a hierarchical organizational structure closely connected to the Iranian state. Its principal institutions included the party congress, the national committee, the central council, and the office of the secretary-general. According to the party's statutes, the congress represented the highest authority and was intended to meet periodically with representatives from party councils and members of the Iranian parliament. In practice, the party leadership remained closely aligned with the government and the Shah's authority. The party also maintained affiliated organizations intended to mobilize different segments of society, including youth organizations and labor bodies such as the Worker House. These institutions were designed to integrate social groups into the political structure established by the Pahlavi state.

=== Central Council ===
The first Central Council of the Rastakhiz Party convened on 23 May 1978 following a message from Mohammad Reza Shah and opening remarks by Jamshid Amouzegar, who served as both prime minister and secretary-general of the party. During the initial session, 55 permanent members of the executive committee were selected from among approximately 1,900 participants in the council. The Central Council's primary responsibility was to make decisions on matters referred to it by the secretary-general, who presided over the body in his capacity as prime minister. The council also reviewed and approved the qualifications of candidates seeking to participate in elections for the two houses of the Iranian parliament as well as local councils.

In addition to the Central Council and executive committee, the party leadership included a smaller political bureau responsible for coordinating party activity with the government. This body included members of the executive committee, as well as representatives of the cabinet, and was chaired by the prime minister, reflecting the close integration of the party with the executive branch of the state.

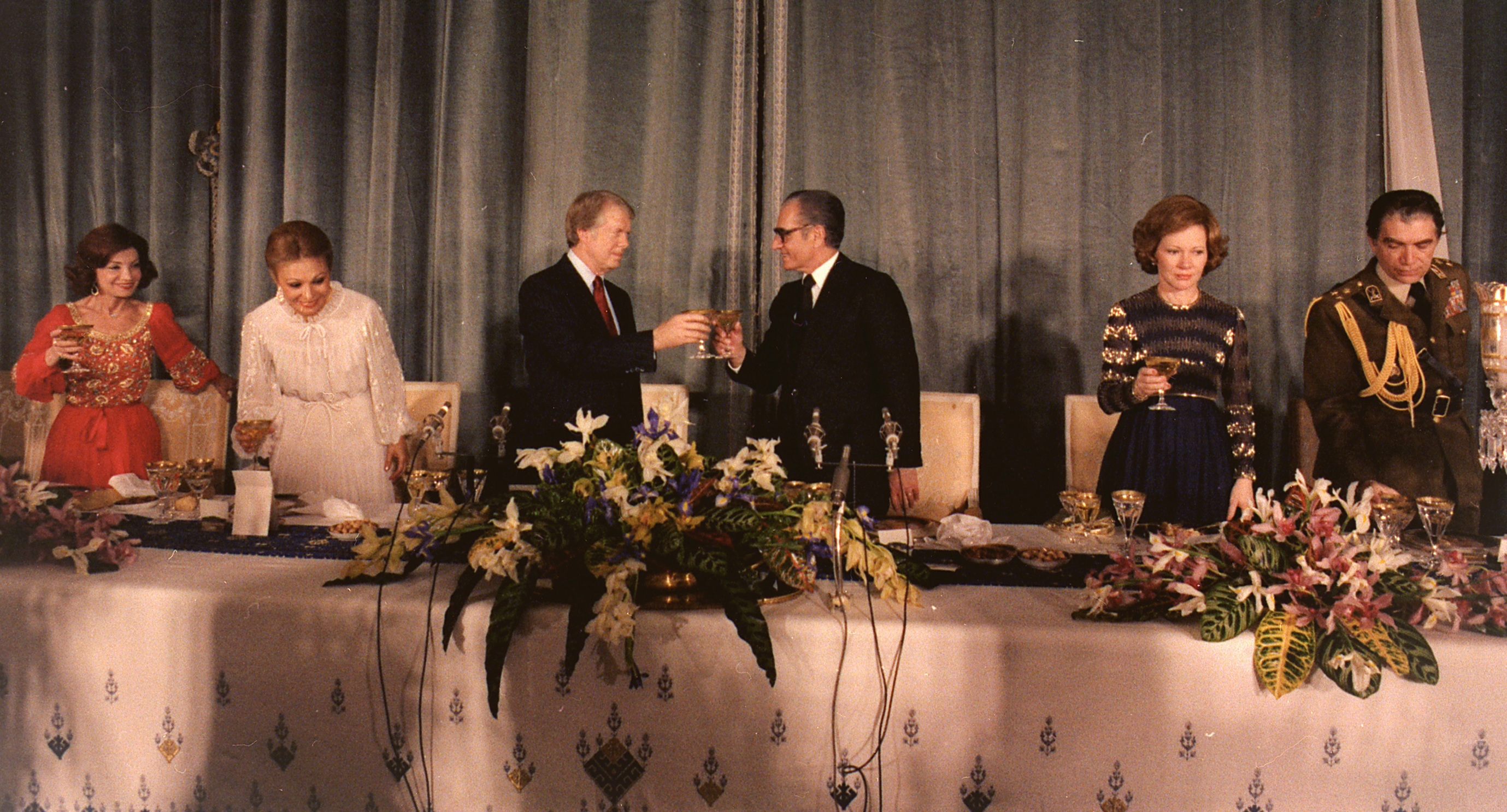
Jimmy Carter and Mohammad Reza Pahlavi toasting each other at Niavaran Palace on 31 December 1977

=== Publications ===
The party sponsored several newspapers and publications intended to promote its political message and communicate government policies to the public. The most prominent publication was Rastakhiz, the party's official newspaper. Other affiliated publications included Rastakhiz-e Javan, Rastakhiz-e Rustā, and Rastakhiz-e Kargaran, which targeted different social groups and served as instruments of political mobilization and propaganda for the party and the state.

=== Membership ===
Official figures claimed that the Rastakhiz Party had several million members by 1976. According to statistics cited by Mohsen Dehā, an official of the Rastakhiz Party, approximately 2.4 million individuals had joined party centers by the end of 1975. This figure reportedly increased to approximately 4.5 million by 1976.

Contemporary and later accounts have suggested that the party's emphasis on numerical expansion often outweighed the creation of meaningful channels for public participation in political life. Membership was strongly encouraged and in many cases effectively compulsory for civil servants, professionals, and business owners. Critics argued that these membership totals reflected administrative enrollment and political pressure more than voluntary participation.

=== Funding ===
The party did not rely on membership dues for funding. Instead, its activities were financed through public revenues as part of the national budget, further reinforcing its character as an extension of the state rather than an independent political organization.

== Economic policies ==
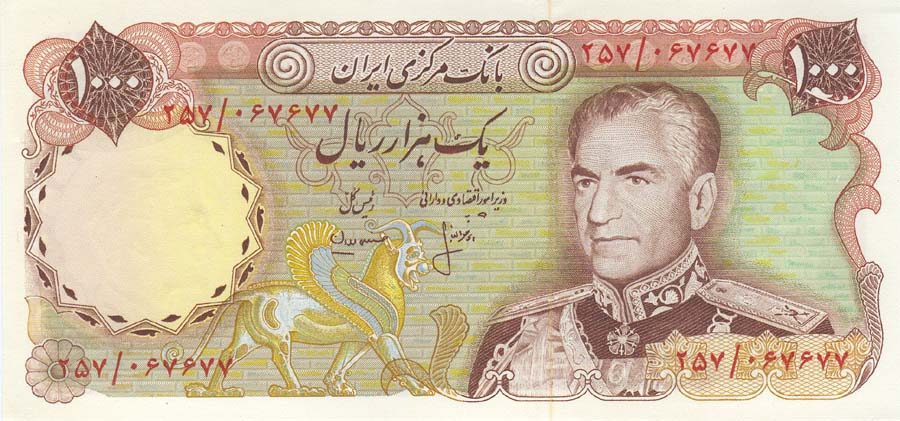
Shah's portrait at the 1000 Iranian rial bank note

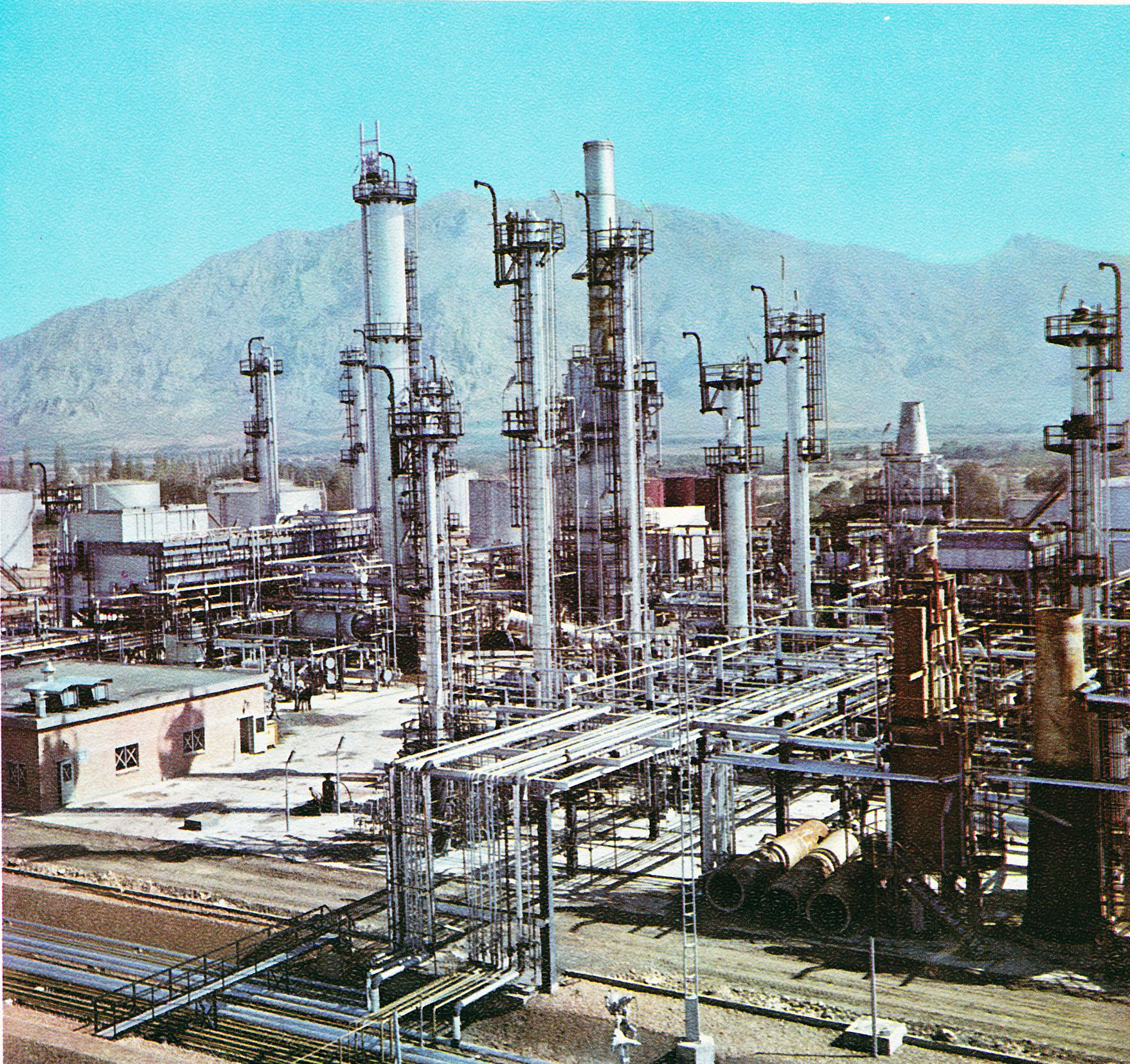
Iran’s real GDP grew rapidly between 1973 and 1977, averaging roughly 9–11 percent annually, while oil export revenues rose substantially, from about $4.3 billion to $20.6 billion. This increase in state income provided the government with significantly greater financial capacity to fund industrial and development projects.

The Rastakhiz Party became involved in economic policy shortly after its formation, particularly through campaigns to control prices and regulate market activity. These measures emerged in the context of rapid inflation, supply bottlenecks, and expanded state spending during the later phases of the White Revolution and the revised Fifth Development Plan. In this period, the party functioned as an auxiliary instrument of state economic enforcement, especially in efforts to supervise retail markets and discipline urban commercial activity.

One of the most notable initiatives associated with the party was the anti-profiteering campaign against price increases and alleged overcharging. A special task force was established within Rastakhiz to coordinate enforcement, and thousands of student inspectors and party activists were deployed to markets and commercial districts to monitor prices and file complaints against merchants. Thousands of shopkeepers were fined, while others faced temporary shop closures, imprisonment, or internal exile. Historians have described the campaign as one of the most significant examples of late Pahlavi economic coercion directed at the bazaar.

The party also became associated with efforts to increase state supervision over the traditional guild system and the bazaars. During the anti-profiteering campaign, government authorities intervened directly in guild institutions, dismissed leading guild officials, and reorganized or dissolved many guild chambers considered insufficiently cooperative with state policy. At the same time, state agencies expanded their role in regulating imports, distributing basic goods such as wheat, sugar, and meat, and implementing price-stabilization measures intended to curb inflation.

Economic initiatives associated with Rastakhiz also reflected broader efforts by the Pahlavi state to expand supervision over industrial ownership, labor participation, and national economic planning. These policies were presented by the Shah as part of a "democratic economy" that would combine private enterprise with broader social participation, while limiting the concentration of private economic power.

Many observers and later historians argued that these policies generated substantial resentment among bazaar merchants and small traders, who viewed the anti-profiteering campaign and expanded regulation as intrusions into traditional economic institutions. The campaign contributed to worsening relations between the monarchy and the bazaar community, and has frequently been cited as one of the factors that strengthened the alliance between bazaar networks and the clerical opposition in the final years of the Pahlavi state.

== Criticism ==
Some historians and critics interpreted the creation of the one-party system as a sign of increasing authoritarianism in the late Pahlavi state. According to historian Ervand Abrahamian, the Shah dismissed demands for political liberalization, stating:

Freedom of thought! Freedom of thought! Democracy, democracy! With five years of strikes and street marches in a row! Democracy? Freedom? What does this mean? We don’t want any of that.

— Ervand Abrahamian, Iran Between Two Revolutions (1982), p. 542.

The party's anti-profiteering campaign targeted merchants in the traditional bazaars, accusing them of price manipulation and economic sabotage. Thousands of shopkeepers were fined, arrested, or forced to temporarily close their businesses. These policies generated significant resentment among the bazaar merchant class, which had historically played an influential role in Iranian society and later became an important supporter of opposition movements during the Iranian Revolution. According to reports cited by historian Benjamin B. Smith, the Rastakhiz Party struggled to develop broad public support. Internal assessments by the intelligence service SAVAK in late 1977 reportedly concluded that the party was widely perceived as dependent on the government and had limited influence among the population. These reports also noted that many Rastakhiz offices were largely inactive.

Internal criticism also emerged within pro-government circles during the final year of the party's existence. In 1978, a political report prepared by the "Iran Issues Study Group," led by Cyrus Nahavandi, attributed the Rastakhiz Party's declining effectiveness to organizational weaknesses, including bureaucratic inefficiency, weak leadership, limited political education, the suppression of internal factional debate, and the absence of effective internal elections. The report argued that these factors contributed to public indifference toward the party and created a broader "political vacuum" in Iranian political life.

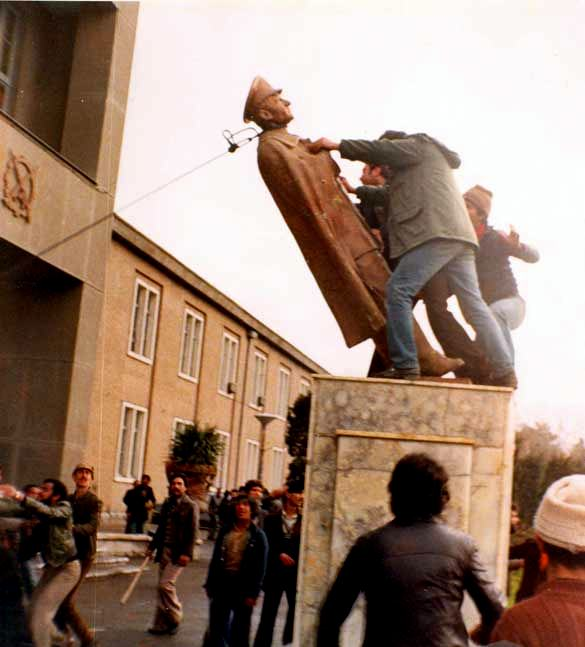
Supporters of the revolution remove a statue of the Shah in Tehran University, 1978

Some contemporary observers described the Rastakhiz Party as lacking genuine political independence. In an oral history interview, American diplomat Michael Metrinko stated:

The Rastakhiz Party I never took seriously as any sort of political expression. It was basically a way for the ass kissers to continue kissing ass. It had no political role other than to serve as a rubber stamp for the Shah. The membership was totally artificial. The leadership was not elected or selected by anyone other than the Shah and his closest advisers. The positions in the party itself, as far as I could see, were simply sinecures or temporary assignments for people to earn money. There was no expression of political fervor or belief, and I met a fair number of the leaders of the party, either in Tehran or in Tabriz. None of them were — that I can think of offhand — were noted particularly for their political acumen or their patriotism or their willingness to serve Iran or anything else. It was just another job.

— Michael Metrinko, interview, 1983.

According to BBC Persian, the dissolution of existing parties and the establishment of a single national party reduced opportunities for political activity in a country that already faced significant restrictions on freedom of expression and political organization.

Ayatollah Ruhollah Khomeini, then living in exile in Najaf, issued a statement condemning the creation of the Rastakhiz Party and declaring participation in it religiously forbidden for Muslims. In the statement, he argued that the party violated the Iranian constitution and accused the monarchy of suppressing Islam and imposing political conformity on the population.

== Anthem ==
=== Lyrics ===
The party anthem, "Time of Resurrection", (Note: Persian: سرود رسمی حزب رستاخیز ایران, romanized: Ruzegâr-e Rastâkhiz) emphasized themes of national rebirth, civic awakening, labor, and devotion to Iran. Its lyrics invoked both modern nationalist imagery and pre-Islamic Iranian symbolism, particularly through references to the land of the Kayanids. The repeated use of rastākhiz ("resurrection" or "rebirth") reflected the party's broader ideological emphasis on renewal and national mobilization.

Persian original

ایرانی، ای، نسل باهوش و پهن،
ای، مردمم جاوید!
ای، غرورت، کارگر روز در
شد روزگار رستاخیز!

برگردان:
ای، وارث سرزمین کیان،
باشید تا ابد جاوید!
عشق وطن این زمان سوی توست،
آمد زمان رستاخیز!

آواز ایران بشو رستاخیز،
آغاز کار، هاست و شور و امید.
آورد سپهر روزگاری سپید،
ای، هموطن، این زمان برخیز!

برگردان

بر نام پاکی ایمان،
میشود برپا کشور ایران.
ای، ایرانیان برخیزید،
چه جلوه گر رستاخیز!

برگردان

English translation

Iranians, O intelligent and broad-minded Youth,
O long live my people!
The wretched days, O workers,
Became the times of resurrection.

Chorus:
O, Heir of the Kayanid land,
Remain ever-eternal.
The eyes of the country are on Thee now,
The time of resurrection has come!

Resurrect the song of Iran,
The time of work, frenzy, and hope has begun.
God has granted us a bright future,
O compatriot, this time awaken!

In the name of our purity,
The country of Iran shall be rebuilt.
O Iranians, rise up
To the manifestation of our resurgence!

== Gallery ==
=== Image gallery ===
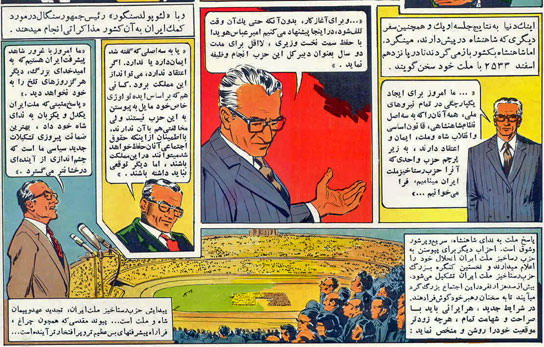
Persian-language political propaganda comic, 1976

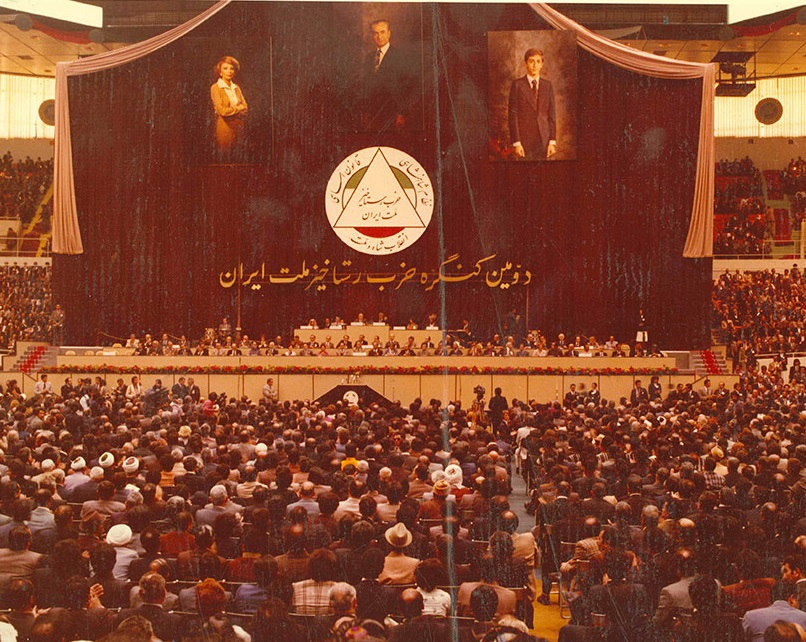
The Second Congress of the Rastakhiz Party at Mohammad Reza Pahlavi Stadium, 1976

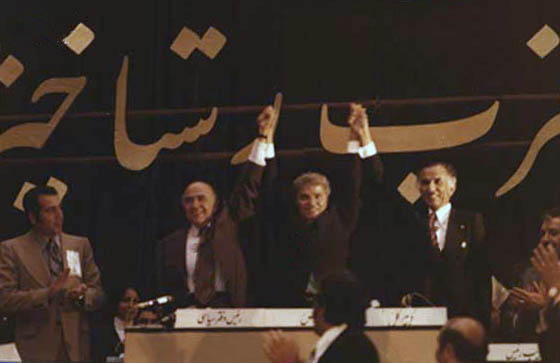
Second Anniversary of Resurgence Party of Iran, March 1976

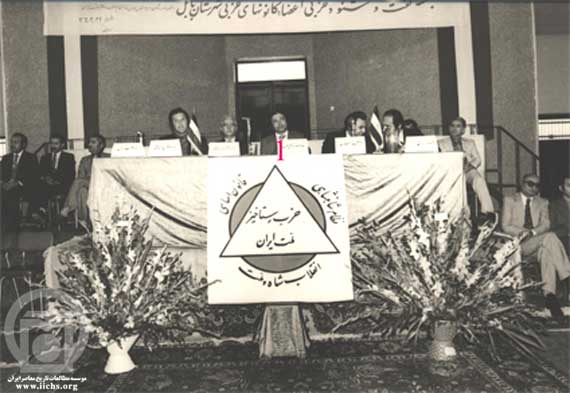
Dariush Homayun in a discussion meeting with members in Babol city, 1977

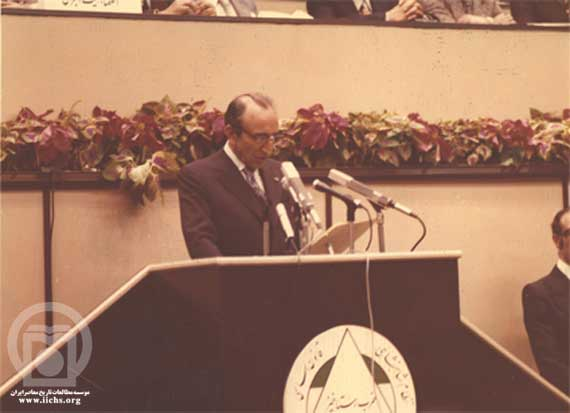
Asadollah Alam, Minister of the Court, during a speech at the second congress of the Rastakhiz Party in Mohammad Reza Pahlavi Stadium

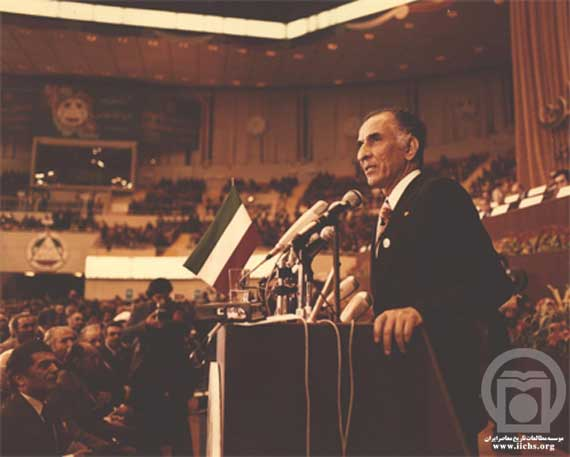
Civil flag of Iran in Rastakhiz Party gathering, 1978

== Electoral history ==
Election	Party leader	Assembly	Senate	Ref
1975	Amir-Abbas Hoveyda	268 / 268	30 / 30	IPU

Voter turnout was 78.6%, although according to official reports, for both houses, out of an electorate of 14 million, 70 percent (9.8 million) registered to vote and 78 percent of the electorate (about 7 million) cast its vote. This was the final election held under the rule of the Shah of Iran before the Iranian Revolution of 1979.

== See also ==
- List of largest political parties
- Party of the New Resurrection of Iran

== Notes ==
Ruling party of Iran
Preceded by New Iran Party	Resurgence Party; 1975–1978	Vacant Title next held by Islamic Republican Party
