= Government of Amir-Abbas Hoveyda (1965–1967) =

Imperial Iran's government between January 1965 and 1967

Government of Amir Abbas Hoveyda
- Cabinet of Pahlavi Iran

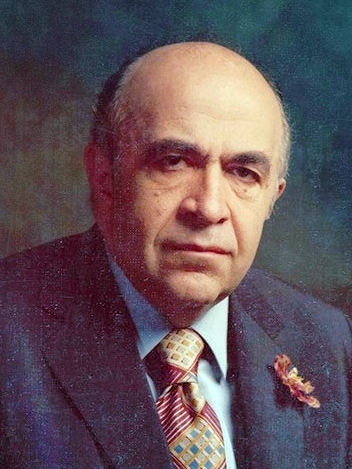
- Prime Minister Amir Abbas Hoveyda
- Date formed: 26 January 1965
- Date dissolved: 1967

People and organisations
- Head of state: Mohammad Reza Pahlavi
- Head of government: Amir-Abbas Hoveyda
- Member party: Iran Novin Party
- Opposition party: People's Party

History
- Predecessor: Government of Hassan Ali Mansur
- Successor: Second Government of Amir Abbas Hoveyda

The cabinet led by Prime Minister Amir-Abbas Hoveyda was formed on 26 January 1965 following the death of his predecessor, Hassan Ali Mansur. Mansur had been shot in an assassination attempt on 21 January and died five days later from post-surgical complications. Hoveyda, who had served as minister of finance in Mansur's cabinet, was appointed prime minister by Mohammad Reza Pahlavi and formed a government that was largely a continuation of Mansur's cabinet.

== List of ministers ==
The cabinet was consisted of the following members.

Portfolio	Minister	Took office	Left office	Party
Prime Minister	Amir-Abbas Hoveyda	26 January 1965	1967	Iran Novin
Deputy Prime Minister	Nematollah Nassiri	26 January 1965	1967	Military
Deputy Prime Minister	Qassan Rezai	26 January 1965	1967	
Deputy Prime Minister	Gholamreza Nikpey	26 January 1965	1967	
Deputy Prime Minister	Nassir Assar	26 January 1965	1967	
Deputy Prime Minister	Karim Pasha Bahaduri	26 January 1965	1967	
Minister of Culture	Mehrdad Pahlbod	26 January 1965	1967	
Minister of War	Asadollah Sani	26 January 1965	1967	
Minister of Foreign Affairs	Abbas Aram	26 January 1965	1966	
Minister of Foreign Affairs	Ardeshir Zahedi	1966	1967	
Minister of Agriculture	Ismail Riahi	26 January 1965	1967	Military
Minister of Interior	Javad Sadr	26 January 1965	1967	Iran Novin
Minister of Telegraph and Telephone	Farhang Shafii	26 January 1965	1967	
Minister of Finance	Jamshid Amouzegar	26 January 1965	1967	
Minister of Roads	Dr. Salchian	26 January 1965	1967	
Minister of Justice	Baqer Amili	26 January 1965	1967	
Minister of Labor	Ataollah Khosravani	26 January 1965	1967	Iran Novin Party
Minister of Health	Manuchehr Shahqoli	26 January 1965	1967	
Minister of Education	Hadi Hedayati	26 January 1965	1967	
Minister of Economy	Alinaghi Alikhani	26 January 1965	1967	Independent
Minister of Posts	Fatollah Satodeh	26 January 1965	1967	
Minister of Information	Hassan Pakravan	26 January 1965	1967	Military
Minister of Water and Power	Mansour Rouhani	26 January 1965	1967	
Minister of Development and Housing	Hushang Nahavandi	26 January 1965	1967	
Minister of State	Mahmoud Kashfian	26 January 1965	1967	
Minister of State	Nasser Yeganeh	26 January 1965	1967	Iran Novin Party
Minister of State	Manuchehr Godarzi	26 January 1965	1967	
Minister of State	Abdol Ali Jahanshahi	26 January 1965	1967	
Minister of State	Mohammad Nasiri	26 January 1965	1967	
Minister of State	Javad Mansur	26 January 1965	1967	

=== Changes ===
In 1966 Abbas Aram, minister of foreign affairs, was replaced by Ardeshir Zahedi.
