= Abbas Aram =

Iranian diplomat (1906–1985)

- عباس آرام
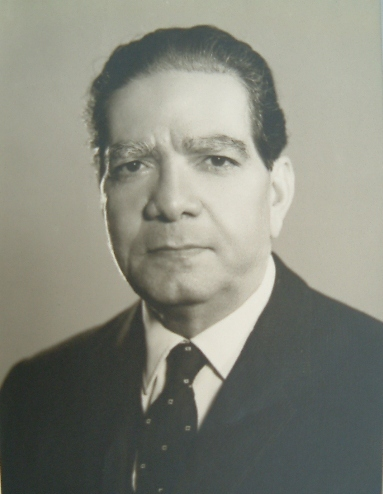

Minister of Foreign Affairs
- In office 19 July 1962 – 1966
- Monarch: Mohammad Reza Pahlavi
- Prime Minister: Asadollah Alam; Hassan Ali Mansur; Amir-Abbas Hoveyda
- Succeeded by: Ardeshir Zahedi
- In office 1959–1960
- Monarch: Mohammad Reza Pahlavi
- Prime Minister: Manouchehr Eghbal; Ali Amini

Personal details
- Born: Gholam Abbas Aram; 1906
- Died: 1985 (aged 78–79)
- Resting place: Behesht-e Zahra, Tehran

Gholam Abbas Aram (1906–1985) was an Iranian diplomat and served as foreign minister for two terms between 1959 and 1960 and between 1962 and 1966. In addition, he was ambassador to Japan، Iraq، United Kingdom and Iran's first ambassador to China.

== Career ==
Aram was the first secretary at the embassy of Iran in the United States in the 1940s. As of 1950 he was serving as the chargé d'affaires there. He was the Iranian ambassador to Japan and then, to Iraq during the reign of Mohammad Reza Shah.

Aram was twice appointed as foreign minister in the late 1950s and 1960s. His first term was brief, from 1959 to 1960. Aram attempted to revive the diplomatic relations with Iraq during the premiership of Abdul-Karim Qasim. However, his attempts were not fruitful due to the suspicious approach of the SAVAK, Iran's security organization, towards Qasim.

Aram was appointed to the post for a second term on 19 July 1962 and served in the first cabinet led by Asadollah Alam. On 30 April and 1 May 1963 Aram represented Iran at the eleventh session of CENTO ministerial council in Karachi, Pakistan. Another significant event during his second term as minister of foreign affairs was the Iran–Soviet Memorandum concerning the sovereign rights of two countries in the Caspian Sea. This agreement is known as Aram-Pegov agreement (Pegov refers to Nikolai Pegov, Soviet signatory of the document and ambassador to Iran), and was signed on 15 September 1962.

Aram was also named as the minister of foreign affairs in the cabinet led by Prime Minister Hassan Ali Mansur on 7 March 1964. He remained in office until 1966 when Ardeshir Zahedi replaced him in the post.

Next Aram served as Iranian ambassador to the United Kingdom. He was appointed to the post in February 1967, replacing Ardeshir Zahedi. Aram's tenure ended in November 1969 when Amir Khosrow Afshar was appointed Iranian ambassador to the United Kingdom. In December 1973, Aram was appointed Iranian ambassador to China, becoming the first Iranian diplomat served in the post.

=== Views ===
In July 1960 and in a press conference, Mohammad Reza Shah expressed his positive attitude towards Israel which was harshly criticised by the Egyptian President Gamal Abdel Nasser. Following the incident both states expelled each other's ambassadors, and the Foreign Minister Aram stated that Gamal Abdel Nasser was a "light-headed pharaoh who is ruling by bloodshed". In the 1960s Aram was among the Iranian statesmen who favoured Iran's close relations with the U.S. and other Western countries in order to secure the survival of the Pahlavi dynasty.

== Later years and death ==
Aram was arrested following the 1979 Iranian Revolution, but was later released. He died in 1985 and was buried in Behesht-e Zahra cemetery in Tehran.
