= Alinaghi Alikhani =

Iranian economist, businessman and politician (1929–2019)

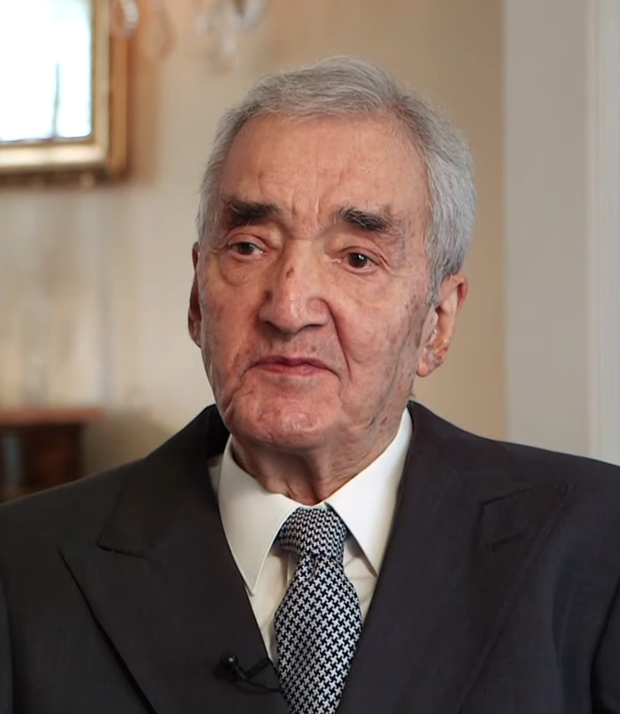

Chancellor of Tehran University
- In office 1969–1971
- Preceded by: Fazlollah Reza
- Succeeded by: Houchang Nahavandi

Minister of Economy
- In office 19 February 1963 – 19 July 1969
- Prime Minister: Asadollah Alam; Hassan Ali Mansour; Amir Abbas Hoveida
- Preceded by: Office established
- Succeeded by: Hushang Ansary

Minister of Industry and Commerce
- In office 1963–1963
- Prime Minister: Asadollah Alam

Personal details
- Born: 21 January 1929 Khamseh, Zanjan Province, Imperial State of Iran
- Died: 25 June 2019 (aged 90)
- Children: 4
- Parent: Abedin Khan (father)
- Education: Tehran University; Paris University

Alinaghi Alikhani (Persian: علینقی عالیخانی; 21 January 1929 – 25 June 2019) was an Iranian economist who held government posts in the 1960s and was the first minister of economy of Iran. He also served as the chancellor of Tehran University.

== Early life and education ==
Alikhani was born in Khamseh, near Abhar, Zanjan Province, on 21 January 1929. His father, Abedin Khan, was a petty officer in the Persian Cossack Brigade, who later began to serve as the administrator of the lands in Khamseh and nearby areas owned by Reza Shah. The family moved to a village, Varamin, near Tehran where Alikhani was raised.

In 1949, Alikhani graduated from Tehran University with a bachelor's degree in law. During his studies at the university he was part of an anti-communism group. He got a doctor of business administration in France. He also received a PhD degree in economics from Paris University. His thesis focused on the potential role of states in encouraging industrialisation. While attending Paris University the Savak officials proposed him to join the organization which Alikhani accepted.

== Career ==
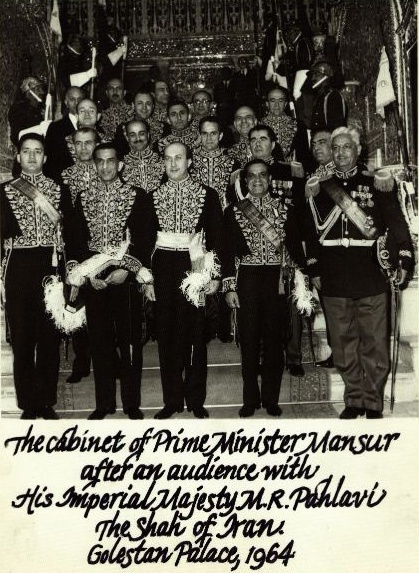
Alinaghi Alikhani (first row, far left) in the inauguration of Cabinet of Mansur on 7 March 1964

Alikhani returned to Iran in 1957 and started his career at the economic analysis department of SAVAK. Next he worked at the National Oil Company and became a consultant to the Tehran Trade Chamber. Alikhani was made the minister of industry and commerce in 1963. Next he was named the minister of economy on 19 February 1963 when the ministry was first established. In fact, Alikhani was asked to involve in the establishment of the ministry of economy transforming the ministry of industry and commerce. The cabinet was headed by Prime Minister Asadollah Alam, and Jahangir Tafazzoli recommended him to appoint Alikhani to the post.

Like other senior officials of the period Alikhani was a supporter of the protectionism and the promotion of the private sector. One of the significant events during his first ministerial term was a commercial agreement between Iran and European Economic Community signed in Brussels on 14 October 1963. Alikhani served in the same post in the next cabinets led by two different prime ministers, Hassan Ali Mansour and Amir Abbas Hoveida. When he was minister of economy Alikhani informed the Shah, Mohammed Reza Pahlavi, about his half-brother Gholam Reza Pahlavi's illegal financial activities with officials from an East European country. He was in office until 19 July 1969 when he resigned from the post. His successor as minister of economy was Hushang Ansary. The reason for his resignation was the clash between the Shah and Alikhani due to the Shah's inclination to intervene in the economy and the regulation of prices.

Alikhani's next post was the Chancellor of Tehran University to which he was appointed in 1969. He held the post until 1971. After his retirement from governmental roles Alikhani involved in business. He also served as a board member of the royal organisation of social welfare headed by Princess Ashraf Pahlavi.

=== Books ===
Alikhani edited the seven volume private diaries of prime minister and minister of court Asadollah Alam. He was one of the men closest to the Shah.

An English synopis was published under the title of The Shah and I: The Confidential Diary of Iran's Royal Court, 1968-77 and Alam Diaries.

== Personal life and death ==
Alikhani met his future wife, a French women, in France during his graduate studies. They had four children, three sons and a daughter.

They were forced to leave Iran just after the Iranian revolution in 1979. Alikhani and his wife Susan settled in the Washington DC area. He died in June 2019.
