= Javad Sadr =

Iranian diplomat and politician (1912–1990)

Seyyed Javad Sadr
- جواد صدر
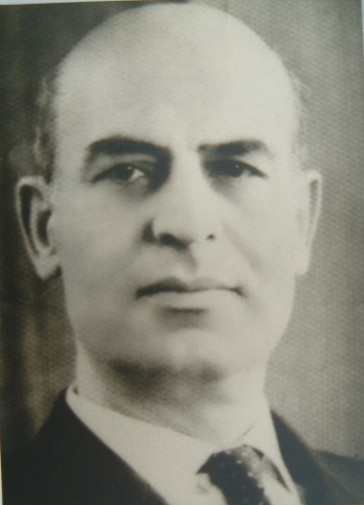

Minister of Justice
- In office 1967–?
- Monarch: Mohammad Reza Pahlavi
- Prime Minister: Amir-Abbas Hoveyda

Minister of Interior
- In office 7 March 1964 – 1967
- Monarch: Mohammad Reza Pahlavi
- Prime Minister: Hassan Ali Mansour; Amir-Abbas Hoveyda

Personal details
- Born: 1912 Tehran, Qajar Iran
- Died: 2000 (aged 87–88) Tehran, Islamic Republic of Iran
- Resting place: Behesht-e-Zahra cemetery Tehran
- Party: Progressive Center; Iran Novin Party
- Education: University of Tehran

Javad Sadr (Persian: جواد صدر; 1912–1990) was an Iranian diplomat and politician who held various public and cabinet posts. He was one of the Iranian ambassadors to Japan. He was the minister of interior and minister of justice in the 1960s.

== Early life and education ==
Sadr was born in Tehran in 1912. He received a degree in law from the University of Tehran and a PhD from a French university.

== Career ==
Following his graduation Sadr started his career at the Ministry of Interior. Then he began to work at the Ministry of Foreign Affairs. He was first secretary at the Iran's general consulate in Palestine from 1945 to 1947. When Abdolhossein Hazhir became prime minister in 1948 Sadr was named as the head of the prime minister’s bureau. He continued to serve in the post during the premiership of Mohammad Sa'ed, Ali Mansur and also, Haj Ali Razmara. Next, Sadr was made the chief of ministerial bureau of the Ministry of Foreign Affairs and the director general of a joint stock company attached to the Ministry of Interior. His diplomatic posts included member of the Iranian mission to the United Nations, chargé d'affaires to Iranian embassy in Yugoslavia and ambassador to Japan.

On 7 March 1964 Sadr was appointed minister of interior to the cabinet formed by Prime Minister Hassan Ali Mansur. He was reappointed to the post when a new cabinet was launched by Prime Minister Amir-Abbas Hoveyda on 26 January 1965. Sadr was in office until 1967 when he was named as the minister of justice to the second cabinet of Hoveyda.

Sadr was first part of the Progressive Center and then, joined Iran Novin Party. He was a freemason being a member of Forughi Lodge.

== Later life and death ==
Sadr was arrested and imprisoned two times following the regime change in Iran in 1979. He died of cancer in Tehran in 1990 after he was released from the prison.
