= Asadollah Sanii =

Iranian minister of defense (1904–)

- اسدالله صنیعی

Minister of War
- In office 30 September 1963 – 2 January 1971; Acting: September 30, 1963 – March 9, 1964
- Monarch: Mohammad Reza Pahlavi
- Prime Minister: Asadollah Alam; Hassan Ali Mansur; Amir-Abbas Hoveyda
- Preceded by: Ali-Asghar Naghdi
- Succeeded by: Reza Azimi

Deputy Minister of War
- In office 10 March 1952 – 19 August 1953

Personal details
- Born: 1904 Hamadan, Qajar Iran
- Died: 14 August 1998 (aged 93–94) Vancouver, Canada
- Spouse: Turandokht Parvini
- Children: 4 (Bahman, Bijan, Maryam and Jaleh)
- Education: Officers' School

Military service
- Allegiance: Pahlavi Iran
- Branch/service: Ground Force
- Years of service: 1926–1978
- Rank: Lieutenant general

Asadollah Sanii (Persian: اسدالله صنیعی; 1904 – August 14 1998) was an Iranian politician who served as minister of war in the 1965 cabinet of prime minister Amir-Abbas Hoveyda.

== Background ==
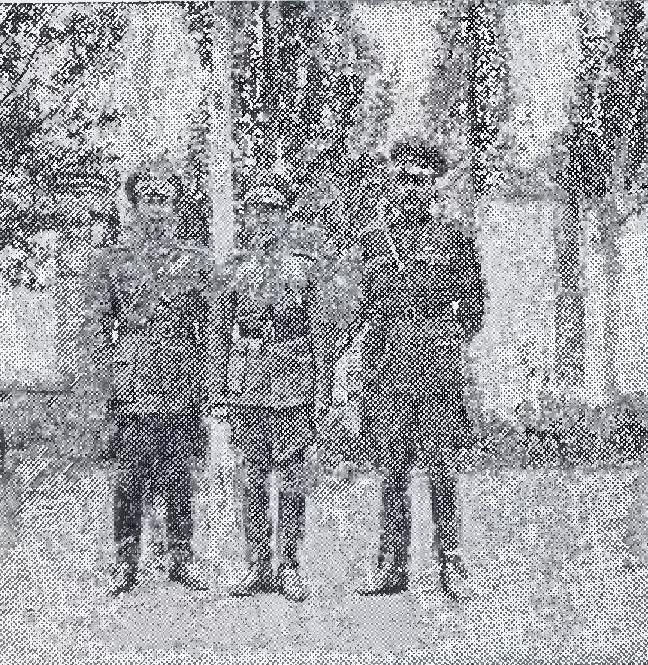
Colonel Asadollah Sanii

Asadollah Sanii was born in 1904 in Hamedan. His father, Mirza Aga Khan, son of Agha Rashid. Among the Aga Khan's sons, only Asadullah - the first child in the family - chose the surname Sani, while his other brothers and sisters chose Rashidi's fame. Sanii married Turandokht Parvini, and raised four children: Bahman, Bijan, Maryam and Jaleh.

== Occupations ==
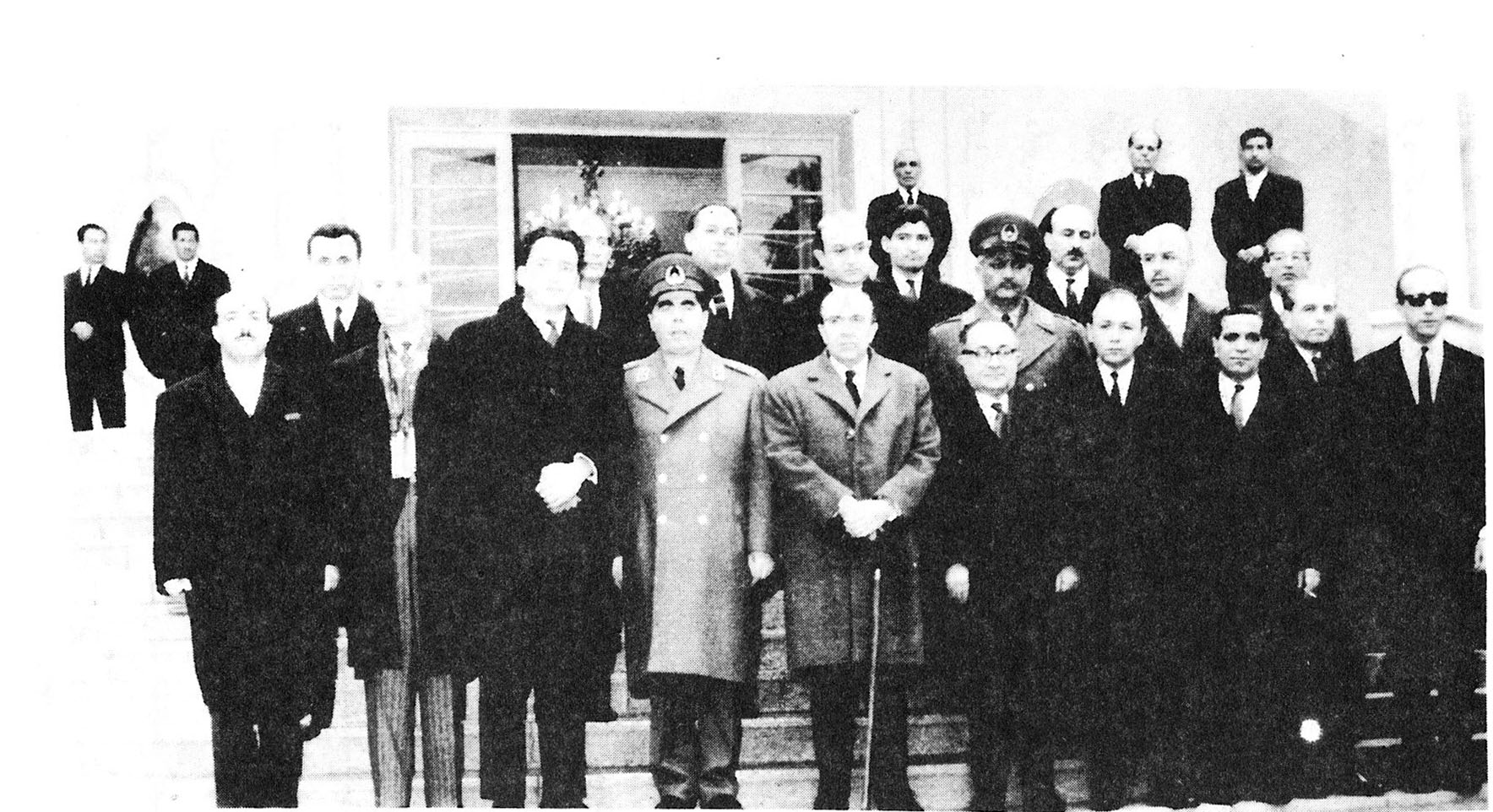
First Cabinet Prime Minister Amir Abbas Hoveyda with Asadollah Sanii

Sani entered the army in 1926 and graduated from officer college in 1928. In the years before the 1953 coup d'état, the industrial jobs are as follows: Head of the complaints department of the Shah's military office (at the beginning of the reign of Mohammad Reza Pahlavi), head of the inspection of the conscription department, member of the supervisory board of Sepeh Bank and inspector of Sepeh Bank, first class financial inspector. Administration, General Inspection of the Army and Deputy Ministry of National Defense in the government of Dr. Mohammad Mossadegh.

From 1953 to 1961, Sanii held important financial positions such as the managing director of the Army Consumption Cooperative Company, the head of the army command department (General Army Procurement Department - Atka) and the chairmanship of the board of directors of the consumption cooperative organization of the police forces and the Minister of War.

== Affiliations ==
While Asadollah Sanii was a follower of the Baháʼí faith, when he was appointed Minister of Defence, the Baháʼí community of Iran expelled him from that community — as Baháʼís are prohibited from involvement in partisan politics — the public, however, still continued to associate him with his previous religion.

The majority of prominent people in political positions under Mohammad Reza Shah’s rule, usually mentioned as Baha’is in the narrative of the Islamic Republic, were not Baha’is. Some came from Baha’i families or had Baha’i ancestors, but never identified themselves with the religion, and even openly expressed their allegiance to Islam.
