= Ataollah Khosravani =

Iranian politician (1919–2005)

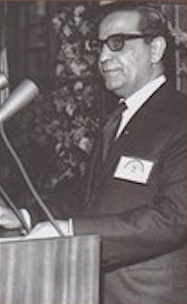

Minister of Interior
- In office 1968–1971
- Prime Minister: Amir Abbas Hoveida
- Preceded by: Abdolreza Ansari

Minister of Labor
- In office 9 May 1961 – 1968
- Prime Minister: Ali Amini; Asadollah Alam; Hassan Ali Mansur; Amir Abbas Hoveida
- Preceded by: Ahmad Ali Bahrami

Personal details
- Born: 1919 Tehran, Qajar Iran
- Died: September 2005 (aged 85–86) Paris, France
- Spouse: France Jacqueline Frederique Boizard de Guise
- Children: 1
- Parent(s): Arbab Mohammad Hashem Khosrovani Mahallati and Marhamat Khanoum

Ataollah Khosrovani (Persian: عطاءالله خسروانی; 1919 – September 2005) was an Iranian politician. He served as the secretary-general of Iran Novin Party and held several cabinet posts in the 1960s.

== Early life and education ==
Khosrovani was born in Mahallat, March 21, 1919. He had eight half-brothers and half-sisters from his father's first marriage, a half-sister from his father's second marriage, another half-sister of his father's third marriage, and five full brothers and a full sister. He graduated from the Adab primary school and the Tharvat junior high school. Then he attended the Alborz College in Tehran. He received a bachelor's degree in social sciences in France.

== Career ==
Following his return to Iran Khosrovani established a magazine entitled Afkar Iran with his brother. Then he was appointed an attaché to the Embassy of Iran in Paris. He served as the minister of labor in three successive cabinets starting from 9 May 1961. He first served in the cabinet led by Prime Minister Ali Amini and succeeded Ahmad Ali Bahrami in the post. He also served in the cabinet of Prime Minister Asadollah Alam between February 1963 and March 1964. He retained his post in the next cabinet led by Hassan Ali Mansur from 7 March 1964 and also, in the cabinet of Amir Abbas Hoveida from January 1965.

Khosrovani was appointed secretary-general of Iran Novin Party 1965 when Prime Minister Hassan Ali Mansur who had been serving as secretary general of the party was assassinated. His tenure as minister of labor ended in 1968, and the same year he was named as the interior minister to the cabinet led by Prime Minister Amir Abbas Hoveyda. Khosrovani's term as the secretary general of the Iran Novin Party ended in 1969. Manouchehr Kalali succeeded him in the post. Khosrovani was removed from office as minister of interior in 1971.

A report by CIA dated February 1976 stated that in mid-1974 Khosrovani was secretly assigned by the Shah Mohammad Reza Pahlavi to analyse the status of the Iran Novin Party to reorganize it. At the end of his investigation Khosrovani co-authored a report which partly led to the closure of the Party in 1975.

== Personal life ==
While living in Paris during his studies, Khosrovani married France Jacqueline Frederique Boizard de Guise (1930-1993), a French national, and had a son. Following the end of the Pahlavi rule in Iran in 1979, he settled in Paris where he died in September 2005.
