= Mansour Rouhani =

Iranian politician (1922–1979)

Minister of Water and Power
- In office 7 March 1964 – ?
- Prime Minister: Hasan Ali Mansur; Amir Abbas Hoveyda

Minister of Agriculture
- In office ? – 27 August 1978
- Prime Minister: Amir Abbas Hoveyda

Personal details
- Born: 1922
- Died: 11 April 1979 (aged 56–57)
- Spouse: Parvin Rouhani

Mansour Rouhani (Persian: منصور روحانی; 1922–11 April 1979) was an Iranian politician who held several government posts during the reign of Shah Mohammad Reza Pahlavi. He was one of the politicians who were murdered after the Iranian Revolution in 1979.

== Biography ==
Rouhani's father followed the Baháʼí Faith whereas his mother was a Muslim.

On 7 March 1964 Rouhani was named as the minister of water and power in the cabinet led by Prime Minister Hasan Ali Mansour. Rouhani served in the same post in the first cabinet of Prime Minister Amir-Abbas Hoveyda from 26 January 1965. He also served as the minister of agriculture in the next cabinet of Amir Abbas Hoveyda. He was reappointed to the post on 13 September 1971.

Rouhani and many other leading figures close to the Shah were removed from office in autumn 1978 shortly after the riots and protests occurred in rural parts of Iran. On 13 September 1978, Rouhani was arrested.

He was in prison when a regime change took place in Iran in February 1979. He was tried by the newly established Islamic Revolutionary Court led by religious judge Sadegh Khalkhali. Rouhani was charged with treason and corruption on earth and sentenced to death. Rasoul Sadr Ameli, an Iranian journalist worked for Ettela'at, reported that when Rouhani learned these claims, he asked the judge how he engaged in war with God. Khalkhali answered him: "You are a Baháʼí." Rouhani was also accused of having destroyed agriculture during his terms as minister of agriculture and minister of water and power.

Rouhani was 57 years old when he was killed by the revolutionaries on 11 April 1979. The same day ten other senior figures, including former foreign minister Abbas Ali Khalatbari, were also executed.

== Personal life ==
His wife was Parvin Rouhani who left Iran before or after the Islamic revolution in 1979 and settled in the United States. The family properties were confiscated by the Islamic government during that period.

Rouhani's son married an American woman, and they both left Iran in 1978.
