= Reza Saffar-Harandi =

Iranian Twelver Shia Muslim martyr

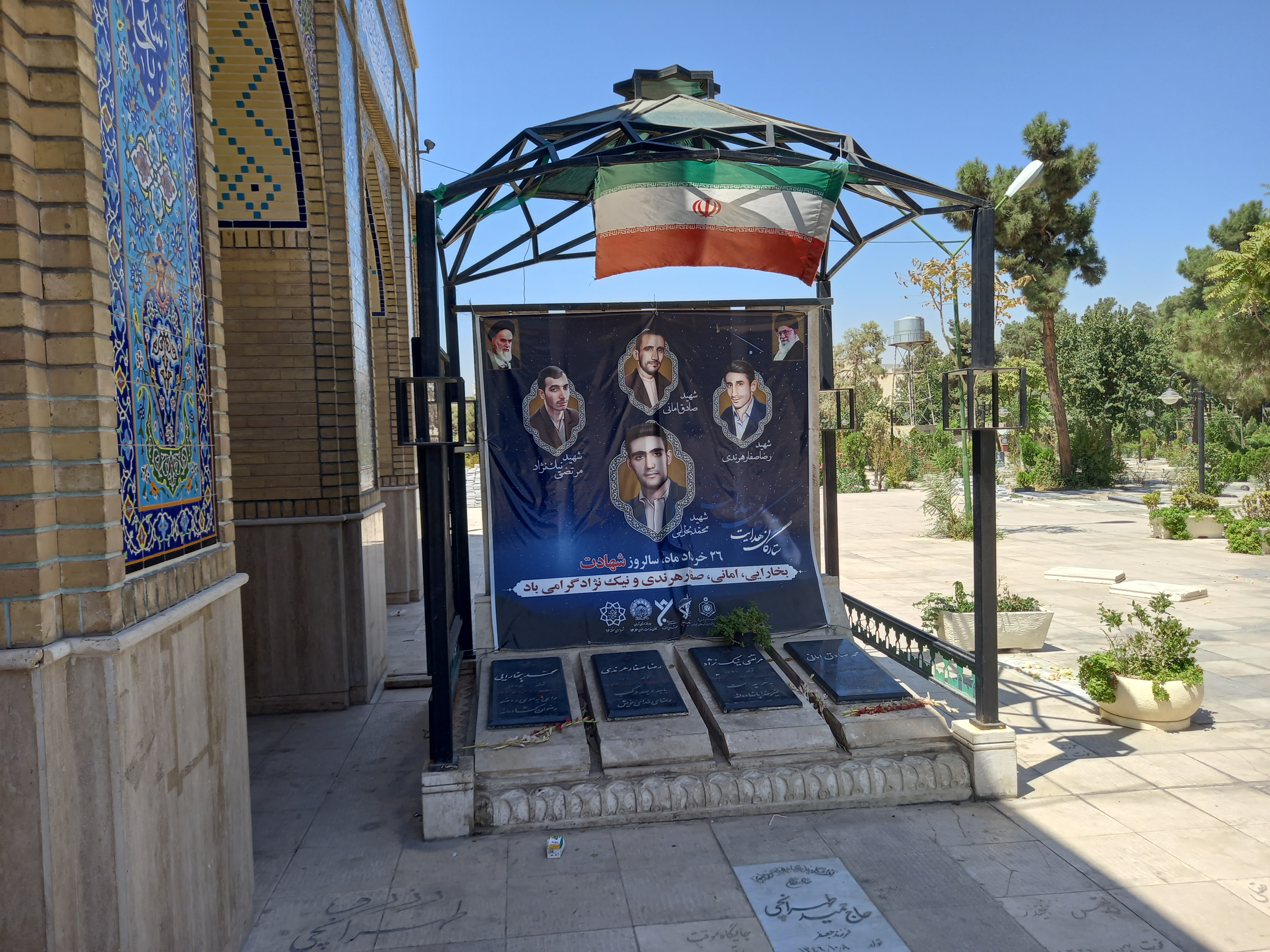
- The graves of martyrs Amani, Niknejad, Harandi and Bukharai in Ibn Baboui cemetery

Personal life
- Born: Reza Saffar-Harandi; 1946 Tehran, Iran
- Died: 16 June 1965 (aged 19) Tehran, Iran
- Cause of death: Execution by firing squad
- Political party: Islamic Coalition Party

Religious life
- Religion: Islam
- Denomination: Shia
- Jurisprudence: Ja'fari

Reza Saffar-Harandi (Persian: رضا صفارهرندی) was an Iranian Twelver Shia Muslim who was a member of Islamic Coalition Party. He was born in 1946 in a religious family; his brother Ali-Asqar Harandi was a Shia cleric. Reza Saffar-Harrandi studied at (Islamic) religious lessons to his brother after passing his primary school. He also used to work in his brother's shop.

Saffar-Harandi had activities at his brother's mosque; and got acquainted there with Mohammad Bokharaei (the killer of Hassan Ali Mansur, the prime minister of the Shah); Saffar-Harandi eventually became familiar with Islamic Coalition Party. This political activist was Mohammad-Bokharaei's accomplice in Mansur's assassination, and escaped after the assassination, although he was later arrested. He was executed by the regime of the Shah on 16 June 1965 along with his three colleagues, namely: Mohammad Bokharaei, Sadeq Amani, and Morteza Niknejad, who were charged with "participation in the assassination of Hassan Ali Mansur, the prime minister of that time".

== See also ==
- Fada'iyan-e Islam
- Islamic Coalition Party
- Navvab Safavi
- Mohammad Bokharaei
