= Government of Hassan Ali Mansur =

Imperial Iran's government between March 1964 and January 1965

Government of Hasan Ali Mansur
- Cabinet of Pahlavi Iran

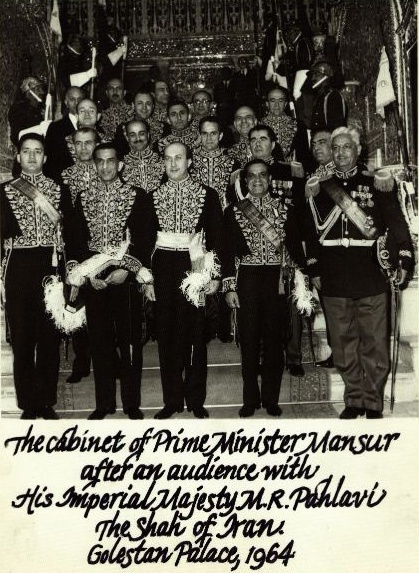
- Inauguration of the Cabinet on 7 March 1964
- Date formed: 7 March 1964
- Date dissolved: January 1965

People and organisations
- Head of state: Mohammad Reza Pahlavi
- Head of government: Hassan Ali Mansur
- Total no. of members: 22
- Member party: Iran Novin Party
- Opposition party: People's Party

History
- Predecessor: Second Government of Asadollah Alam
- Successor: Government of Amir Abbas Hoveyda

The cabinet led by Prime Minister Hassan Ali Mansur was inaugurated on 7 March 1964. It replaced the second government of Asadollah Alam. Mansur's cabinet was the first of party-governments in Iran. It was led by the Iran Novin Party and was approved by the Majlis on 8 March. It enjoyed nearly full confirmation at the Majlis, including the members of the opposition party, People's Party.

The cabinet's term ended in January 1965 when Hassan Ali Mansur was assassinated. Next cabinet was formed by Amir Abbas Hoveyda.

== Cabinet members ==
The cabinet was consisted of the following twenty-two members. Some members served in the previous cabinet led by Asadollah Alam, and most of them were part of the Iran Novin Party.

Four new ministries introduced through the establishment of the cabinet. One of them was the Ministry of Information which had replaced the Department of Publications and Broadcasting.

== List of ministers ==
Portfolio	Minister	Took office	Left office	Party
Prime Minister	Hassan Ali Mansur	7 March 1964	January 1965	Iran Novin Party
Deputy Prime Minister; Minister of State	Nasser Yeganeh	7 March 1964	January 1965	Iran Novin
Deputy Prime Minister	Mehrdad Pahlbod	7 March 1964	January 1965	Iran Novin
Deputy Prime Minister	Qasim Ridai	7 March 1964	January 1965	Iran Novin
Minister of War	Asadollah Sani	7 March 1964	January 1965	Military
Minister of Foreign Affairs	Abbas Aram	7 March 1964	January 1965	Independent
Minister of Agriculture	Ismail Riahi	7 March 1964	January 1965	Iran Novin
Minister of Interior	Javad Sadr	7 March 1964	January 1965	Iran Novin
Minister of Telegraph and Telephone	Farhang Shafii	7 March 1964	January 1965	Iran Novin
Minister of Finance	Amir-Abbas Hoveyda	7 March 1964	January 1965	Iran Novin
Minister of Roads	Mahmoud Kashfia	7 March 1964	January 1965	Iran Novin
Minister of Justice	Bagher Ameli	7 March 1964	January 1965	Iran Novin
Minister of Labor	Ataollah Khosravani	7 March 1964	January 1965	Iran Novin Party
Minister of Health	Jamshid Amouzegar	7 March 1964	January 1965	Iran Novin
Minister of Education	Abdol Ali Jahanshahi	7 March 1964	January 1965	Iran Novin
Minister of Economy	Alinaghi Alikhani	7 March 1964	January 1965	Independent
Minister of Information	Nusratullah Muinian	7 March 1964	January 1965	Iran Novin
Minister of Water and Power	Mansour Rouhani	7 March 1964	January 1965	
Minister of State	Muhammad Nasiri	7 March 1964	January 1965	Iran Novin
Minister of State	Hadi Hedayati	7 March 1964	January 1965	Iran Novin
Minister of State	Manuchehr Godarzi	7 March 1964	January 1965	Iran Novin
Security and Intelligence Agency	Hassan Pakravan	7 March 1964	January 1965	Military
