= Khandaniha =

General interest magazine in Iran (1940–1979)

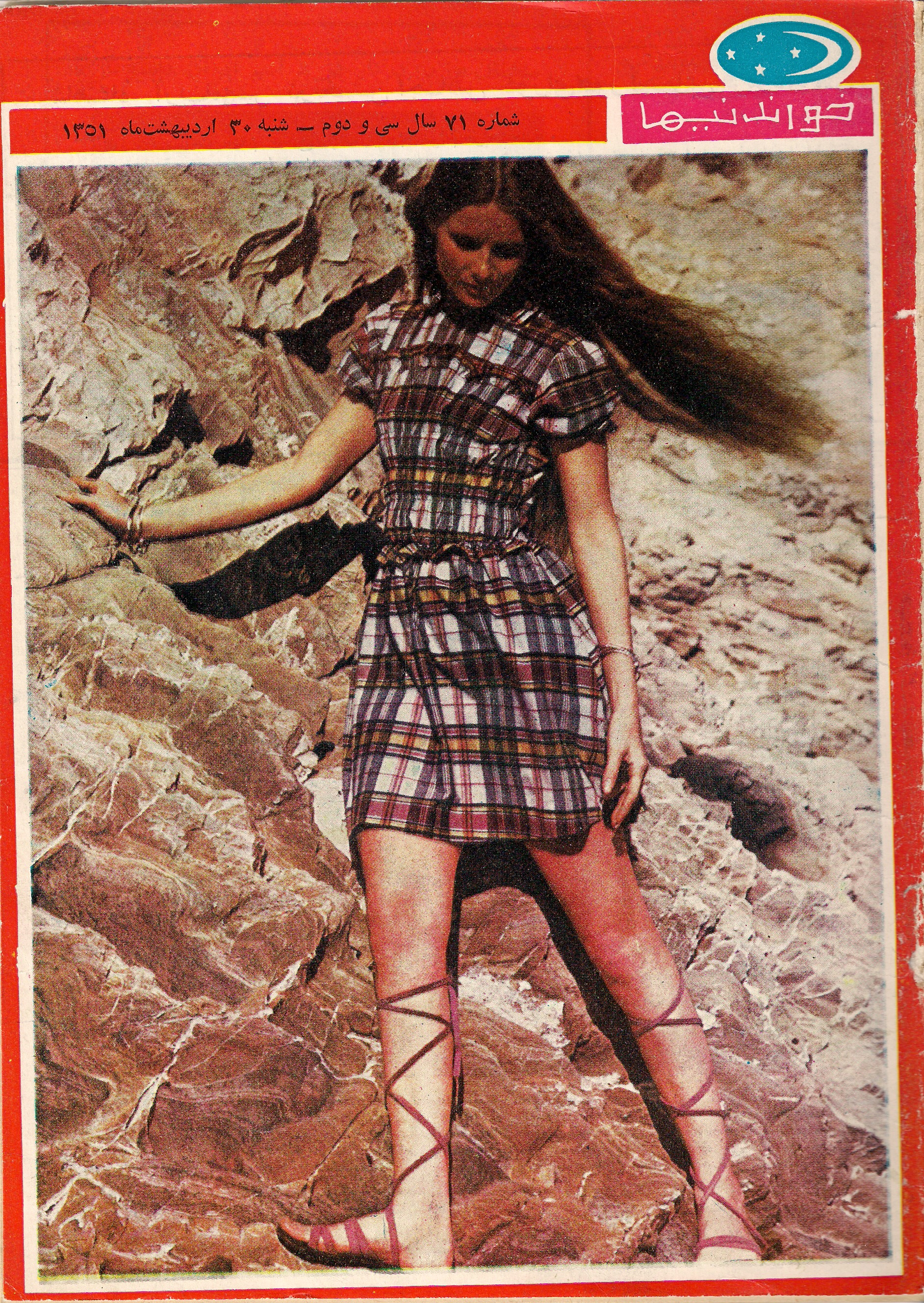
Cover page dated 10 May 1972

Khandaniha (Persian: خواندنیها; lit. 'worth reading') was a Persian-language magazine published by Ali Asghar Amirani, which, like Reader's Digest, published gathered articles from other magazines in addition to its own articles, some in abridged form. The magazine was published from August 1940 to August 1979.

== History and profile ==
Khandaniha was founded in Tehran in August 1940 by Ali Asghar Amirani. Tehran had a horse racing track in Jalaliyeh Park, so Ali Asghar Amirani wanted to start a magazine covering horse racing because there was no paper that published race results immediately at that time. After Amirani was refused a license to run his own newspaper because of his young age, he found that publishing articles that had already been published did not require a separate license. So he put together a number of older articles and published them with the race results in a weekly magazine he called Khandaniha.

With the Anglo-Soviet invasion of Iran in August 1941 and the subsequent occupation by British and Soviet troops, the licensing of newspapers was also reorganized, so that a large number of new daily and weekly newspapers appeared. Readers who were not used to this abundance of information increasingly turned to Khandaniha, in which the most important articles of the week from the most important newspapers were published together with an editorial by Amirani. Ali Asghar Amirani had found his format. Khandaniha became an economic success. In the mid-1950s it published articles on Hollywood stars such as Gina Lollobrigida and on Iranian celebrities.

By the mid-1970s, Khandaniha had become so popular that it changed from once a week to three times a week. Increasingly, own articles were published in the journal. One of the main editors of the magazine was Zabiholla Mansuri. He wrote on almost all subjects, from "Esoteric Aspects of Islamic Theology" to "Flying Saucers". Mansuri also introduced the Khandaniha serial story format. After completing a story, the articles were combined and sold as a book. The editions of these books reached several hundred thousand. In order to better control the press, in the mid-1970s under Prime Minister Amir Abbas Hoveyda every magazine had to include a government-appointed publisher. It was only with the policy of the “open political space” that began in 1977 that the content of the magazines was no longer bound by specifications. Khandaniha now also took up politically controversial topics such as corruption, despotism and the abuse of power. Amirani directed his criticism primarily against the prime minister and the government. No criticism was aimed at the Shah, whom Amirani had historically supported.

After the Islamic Revolution, Amirani changed political camps and went from being a supporter of the monarchy to being its greatest critic. For forty years he had supported the monarchy in more than five hundred issues of his magazine, so that the sudden change of heart was not believed. In March 1979, Amirani was arrested and charged with participating in the political overthrow of then Prime Minister Mohammad Mossadegh in 1953. After four months, Amirani was released without charge. After six months, Amirani was arrested again, sentenced to death on 22 June 1981, and executed.
