= Nasser Yeganeh =

Iranian politician (1921–1993)

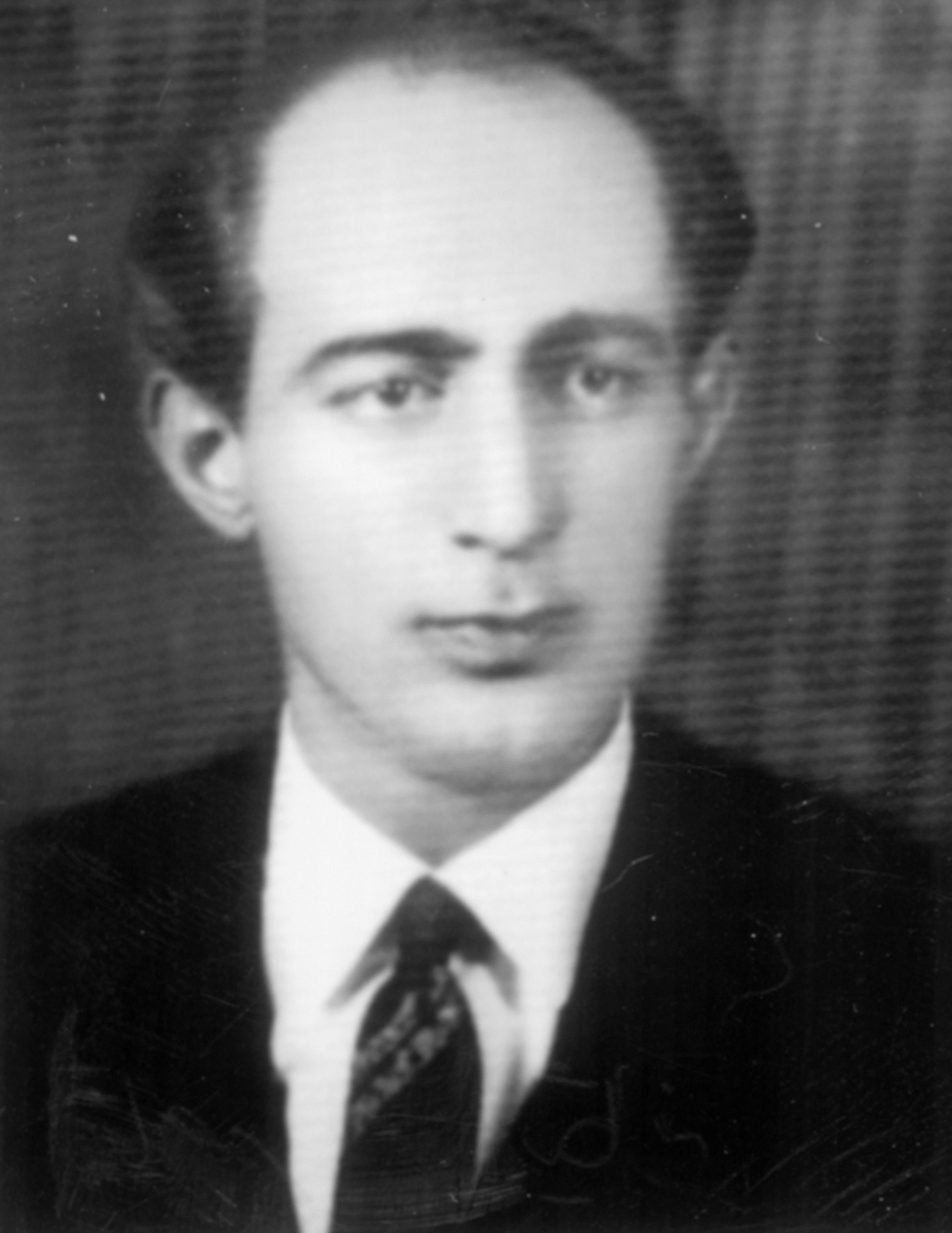

Chief Justice of the Supreme Court of Iran
- In office 1975–1979
- Prime Minister: Amir-Abbas Hoveyda
- Preceded by: Emadoddin Mirmotahhari
- Succeeded by: Mehdi Sajjadian

Personal details
- Born: June 4, 1921 Qazvin, Qajar Iran
- Died: November 15, 1993 (aged 72) Washington, D.C., United States
- Party: New Iran Party (1964-1975); Rastakhiz Party (1975-1979)
- Education: University of Tehran (LL.B.); Sorbonne (Ph.D.)
- Profession: Judge

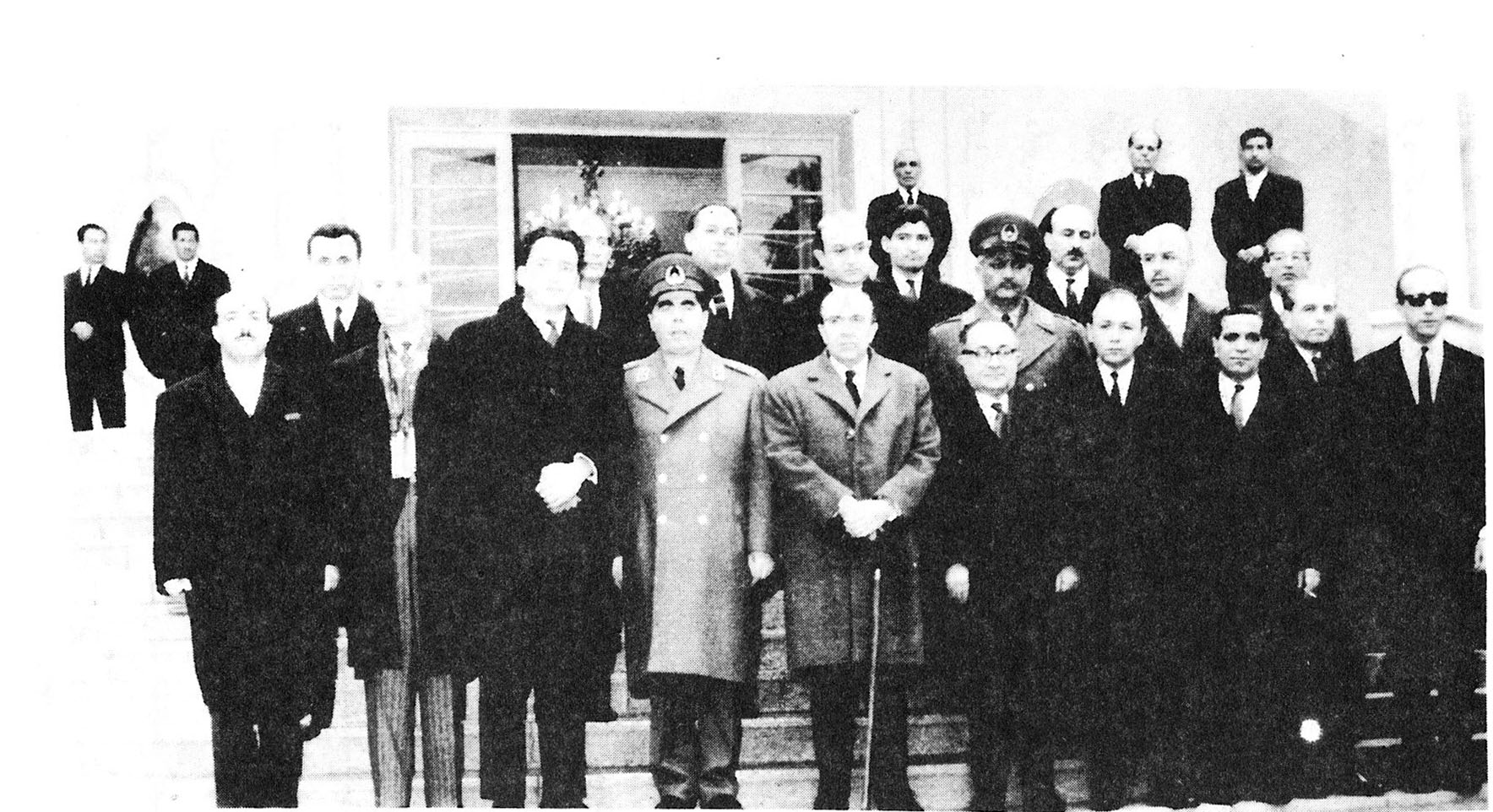
Hoveyda's cabinet in 1971 including Yeganeh.

Nasser Yeganeh (Persian: ناصر یگانه; 4 June 1921 – 15 November 1993) was an Iranian jurist, politician and statesman. He served as Chief Justice of the Supreme Court, the head of the Iranian judiciary, brought in during Amir-Abbas Hoveyda's tenure.

== Early life and education ==
Yeganeh was born in 1921, to an aristocratic family in Qazvin. His father, Mirza Ghaffar Khan Yeganeh (more commonly known as Salar Mansour), was the Hakim (Governor) of Qazvin. Yeganeh attended primary and secondary school in Qazvin before going to the University of Tehran where he received a Bachelor of Laws. He then went to France to pursue a PhD in Public Law from the Sorbonne. Following his graduation, Yeganeh traveled to the United States where he studied the American judicial system.

== Career ==
Yeganeh served as deputy in 1963. He was the minister of state (1963–1971), senator (1971–1974) and chief justice of the Supreme Court (1975–1979). He also served as the deputy prime minister in the cabinet led by Hassan Ali Mansur in the period between March 1964 and January 1965.

== Death ==
Yeganeh fled to the United States following the 1979 Iranian Revolution and on 15 November 1993 committed suicide on his boat in Washington, D.C.
