= Morteza Niknejad =

Personal life
- Born: 1942 Tehran, Iran
- Died: 16 June 1965 (aged 22–23) Tehran, Iran
- Cause of death: Execution by firing squad

Religious life
- Religion: Islam
- Denomination: Shiite (Shia)
- Jurisprudence: Ja'fari

Morteza Niknejad (Persian: مرتضی نیک‌نژاد) was an Iranian Shia Twelver who was a member of Islamic Coalition Party. Niknejad was born in 1942 in the south of Tehran in a religious family; he too was a religious person since his adolescence. Morteza passed his primary school, and later commenced working at a market—as a Galesh seller.

Niknejad got acquainted with Reza Saffar-Harandi and Mohammad Bokharaei, and together the three got familiar with Islamic Coalition Party. He was a practical supporter of Mohammad-Bokharaei in the assassination of Hassan Ali Mansur, the prime minister of the Shah. Afterwards, he was arrested, and later executed by the regime of the Shah on 16 June 1965 along with his three colleagues, namely: Mohammad Bokharaei, Sadeq Amani and Reza Saffar-Harandi, who were charged with "participation in the assassinating of Hassan Ali Mansur".

== See also ==
- Fada'iyan-e Islam
- Islamic Coalition Party
- Navvab Safavi
- Mohammad Bokharaei
