= Mohammad Bokharaei =

Iranian politician

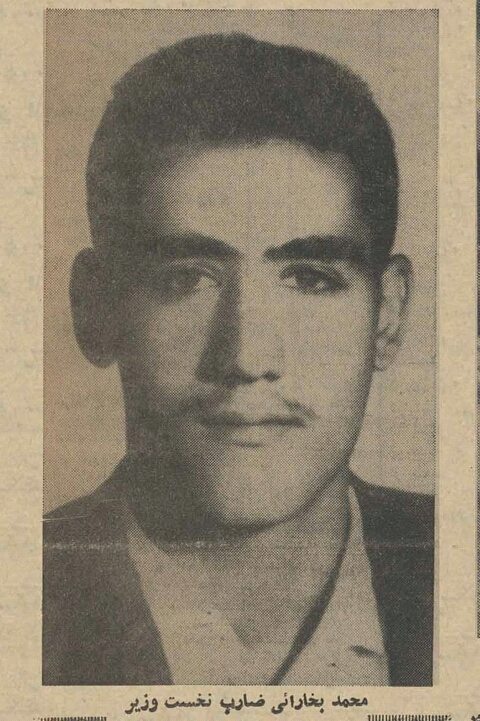
Mohammad Bokharaei in 1965

Mohammad Bokharaei (Persian: محمد بخارایی) was a member of the executive branch of the "Islamic Coalition Party" who was born in 1944 in the south of Tehran. In January 1965, he assassinated Hassan Ali Mansur (then prime minister of the Shah) and was executed in June 1965 along with three of his colleagues.

== Assassination of Hassan Ali Mansur ==
Mohammad Bokharai, on the morning of 21 January 1965 at 10am attacked Hassan Ali Mansur who had been prime minister of Iran since 1964 during the reign of Mohammad Reza Pahlavi. When Hassan Ali Mansour got out of his car at the front door of the National Consultative Assembly, Mohammad Bokharai shot him. As a result, Hassan Ali Mansur died in hospital five days later. Mohammad Bokharai's action came at a time when Mohammad Hadi al-Milani had issued a Fatwa in Mashhad about Mansur's murder.

== Execution by the Shah regime ==
Mohammad Bokharai was executed at dawn on 16 June 1965, along with three colleagues who were all members of the Islamic Coalition Party, namely Sadeq Amani, Reza Saffar-Harandi and Morteza Niknejad.

== See also ==
- Fada'iyan-e Islam
- Navvab Safavi
