= Ardeshir Zahedi =

Iranian politician and diplomat (1928–2021)

Ardeshir Zahedi GCVO
- اردشیر زاهدی
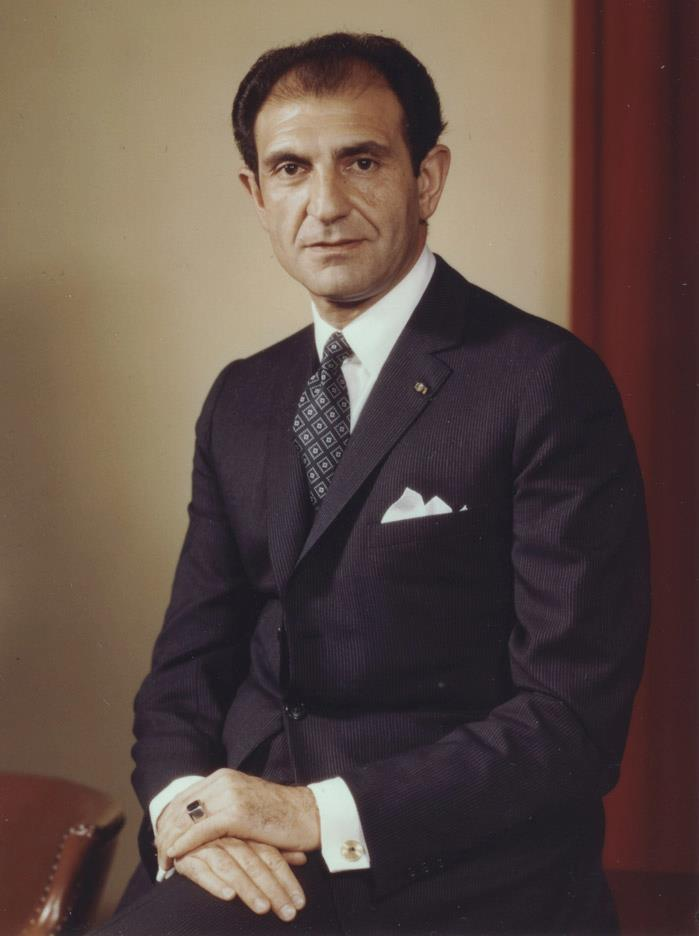
- Zahedi in 1968

Minister of Foreign Affairs
- In office 12 January 1966 – 12 September 1971
- Prime Minister: Amir-Abbas Hoveida
- Preceded by: Abbas Aram
- Succeeded by: Abbas Ali Khalatbari

Ambassador of Iran to the United States
- In office 7 March 1973 – 11 February 1979
- Preceded by: Amir Aslan Afshar
- Succeeded by: Mehdi Haeri Yazdi
- In office 16 March 1960 – 3 March 1962
- Preceded by: Ali Gholi Ardalan
- Succeeded by: Hossein Ghods-Nakhai

Ambassador of Iran to the United Kingdom
- In office 1962–1966
- Preceded by: Mohsen Rais
- Succeeded by: Abbas Aram

Personal details
- Born: 16 October 1928 Tehran, Iran
- Died: 18 November 2021 (aged 93) Montreux, Switzerland
- Spouse: Shahnaz Pahlavi (m. 1957; div. 1964)
- Children: Zahra Mahnaz Zahedi
- Parent(s): Fazlollah Zahedi; Khadijeh Pirnia
- Education: Utah State University

Ardeshir Zahedi GCVO (Persian: اردشیر زاهدی; 16 October 1928 – 18 November 2021) was a prominent Iranian politician and diplomat who served as the country's foreign minister from 1966 to 1971, and its ambassador to the United States and the United Kingdom during the 1960s and 1970s. He was the last official Iranian ambassador to the US. He resigned his position following the Iranian revolution in 1979 and overthrow of the Pahlavi dynasty.

== Early life ==
Born in Tehran on 16 October 1928, his father was General Fazlollah Zahedi, who served as prime minister after participating in the CIA-led coup which led to the fall of Mohammed Mosaddegh, and his mother was Khadijeh Pirnia who was a great-grand-daughter of Mozaffar ad-Din Shah.

Zahedi received a degree in agriculture from the Utah State University in 1950, where he was a member of Kappa Sigma. Seven years later, he married the eldest daughter of the Shah of Iran and niece of the last King of Egypt, Princess Shahnaz Pahlavi; the marriage ended in divorce in 1964.

== Political life ==
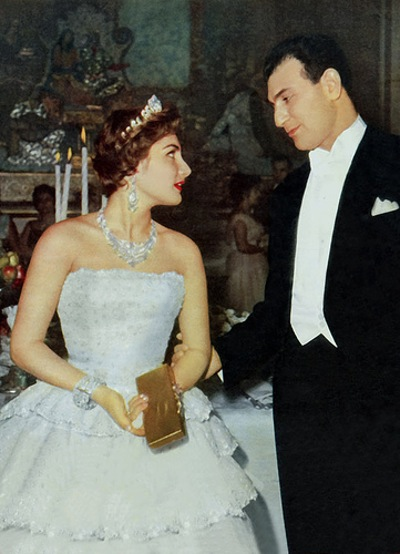
Princess Shahnaz and Ardeshir Zahedi, 1957

Zahedi with President Richard Nixon in Tehran, 1969

Zahedi served as ambassador to the United States from 1960 to 1962 and to the United Kingdom from 1962 to 1966. He served as minister of foreign affairs from 1966 to 1971 in the cabinet of Prime Minister Amir Abbas Hoveida. Zahedi again became ambassador to the United States from 1973 until the Iranian Revolution climaxed in January 1979. During his second stint in Washington, he won a reputation for extravagance. In the mid-1970s, Zahedi became known as a companion of the American actress Elizabeth Taylor. During the 1977 Hanafi Siege of a federal building in Washington, Zahedi and two other ambassadors from Muslim nations were able to talk the hostage-takers into surrendering and releasing 149 hostages.

Over the course of 1978, it was reported in some circles that Zahedi urged the Shah to appease the rioters by making scapegoats of several high-ranking officials, including Amir Abbas Hoveida (then Prime Minister) and SAVAK director Nematollah Nassiri. When the Shah left Iran in 1979, Zahedi was still serving as ambassador in Washington, but resigned as soon as Khomeini came to power. He started fervent attempts at securing political asylum for the ailing Shah and the Imperial family in Panama, Mexico, Morocco and finally Egypt. He was present at the Shah's death bed and funeral in Cairo in 1980.

== Later years ==
Zahedi lived in retirement in Montreux, Switzerland. He received honorary doctoral degrees of law and humanities from Utah State University, East Texas State University, Kent State University, St. Louis University, University of Texas, Montana State University, Washington College, Westminster College, Harvard University, Chung-Ang University of Seoul, and the College of Political and Social Science of Lima in Peru. In December 1976, in a ceremony held in Washington D.C., Zahedi was awarded the Kappa Sigma Fraternity 'Man of the Year' Award. In 2002, he was inducted into the Alumni Hall of Honor of the Utah State University College of Agriculture. He received many awards and honors from nations around the globe for his humanitarian service and record in international affairs.

He died at his residence in Montreux, Switzerland, on 18 November 2021, aged 93.

Zahedi's papers are held in the collection of the Hoover Institution.

=== Views ===
In an interview in May 2006, Zahedi voiced his support for Iran's Nuclear Program stating it as an "inalienable right of Iran", under the Nuclear Non-Proliferation Treaty (NPT). He told Voice of America (VOA) that the U.S. approved the start of Iran's $50 billion nuclear program in the 1970s. Two documents in particular, dated 22 April 1975 and 20 April 1976, show that the United States and Iran held negotiations on a nuclear program and the U.S. was willing to help Iran by setting up uranium enrichment and fuel reprocessing facilities.

== Honours ==
=== National honours ===
- Order of the Crown, 1st Class (Imperial State of Iran)
- Order of Humayoun, 1st Class (Imperial State of Iran)

=== Foreign honours ===
- Honorary Knight Grand Cross of the Royal Victorian Order (GCVO) of the United Kingdom
- Order of Merit of the Federal Republic of West Germany (27 May 1967)
- Most Exalted Order of the White Elephant of Thailand (22 January 1968)
- Honorary Grand Commander of the Most Esteemed Order of Loyalty to the Crown of Malaysia (SSM) of Malaysia (1968)
- Order of the Sacred Treasure of Japan (1969)
- Grand Cross of the Royal Order of Vasa of Sweden (1971)
- Mexican Order of the Aztec Eagle of Mexico (1975)
- Sovereign Military Hospitaller Order of Saint John of Jerusalem, of Rhodes and of Malta (24 February 2016)
