= Houchang Nahavandi =

Iranian academic and politician (1932–2025)

- هوشنگ نهاوندی
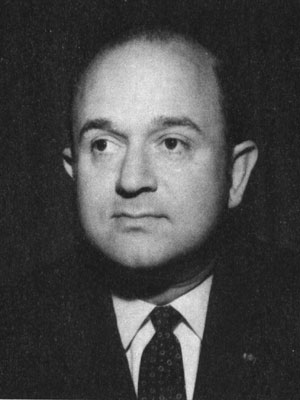

Minister of Housing
- In office 7 March 1964 – 1969
- Prime Minister: Hassan Ali Mansur; Amir-Abbas Hoveida

Chancellor of Tehran University
- In office 1971–1976
- Prime Minister: Amir-Abbas Hoveyda

Minister of Science
- In office 27 August 1978 – 1978
- Prime Minister: Jafar Sharif-Emami
- Succeeded by: Abolfazl Qazi

Personal details
- Born: 2 December 1932 Tehran, Persia
- Died: 19 October 2025 (aged 92) Brussels, Belgium
- Party: Rastakhiz Party
- Occupation: Academic, politician

Houchang Nahavandi, also referred to as Houshang Nahavandi, (Persian: هوشنگ نهاوندی; 2 December 1932 – 19 October 2025) was an Iranian academic, economist and politician. Nahavandi was President of Pahlavi University from 1968 to 1971 and was President of University of Tehran from 1971 to 1976 and was Minister of Science from 27 August 1978 to 5 November 1978. He also worked as the Minister of Housing for a while in his 40s. Nahavandi lived in exile from 1979 onwards. At the time of his death, he was a correspondent for the Académie des Sciences Morales et Politiques in France. Nahavandi authored several books.

In 2005, Nahavandi published The Last Shah Of Iran, a biography of Mohammad Reza Pahlavi.

Nahavandi also wrote the book Iran 4000 ans d'histoire with Yves Bomati, a book about the history of Iran.

Nahavandi died on 19 October 2025, at the age of 92.
