= A.S.P. Towers =

Residential complex in Tehran, Iran

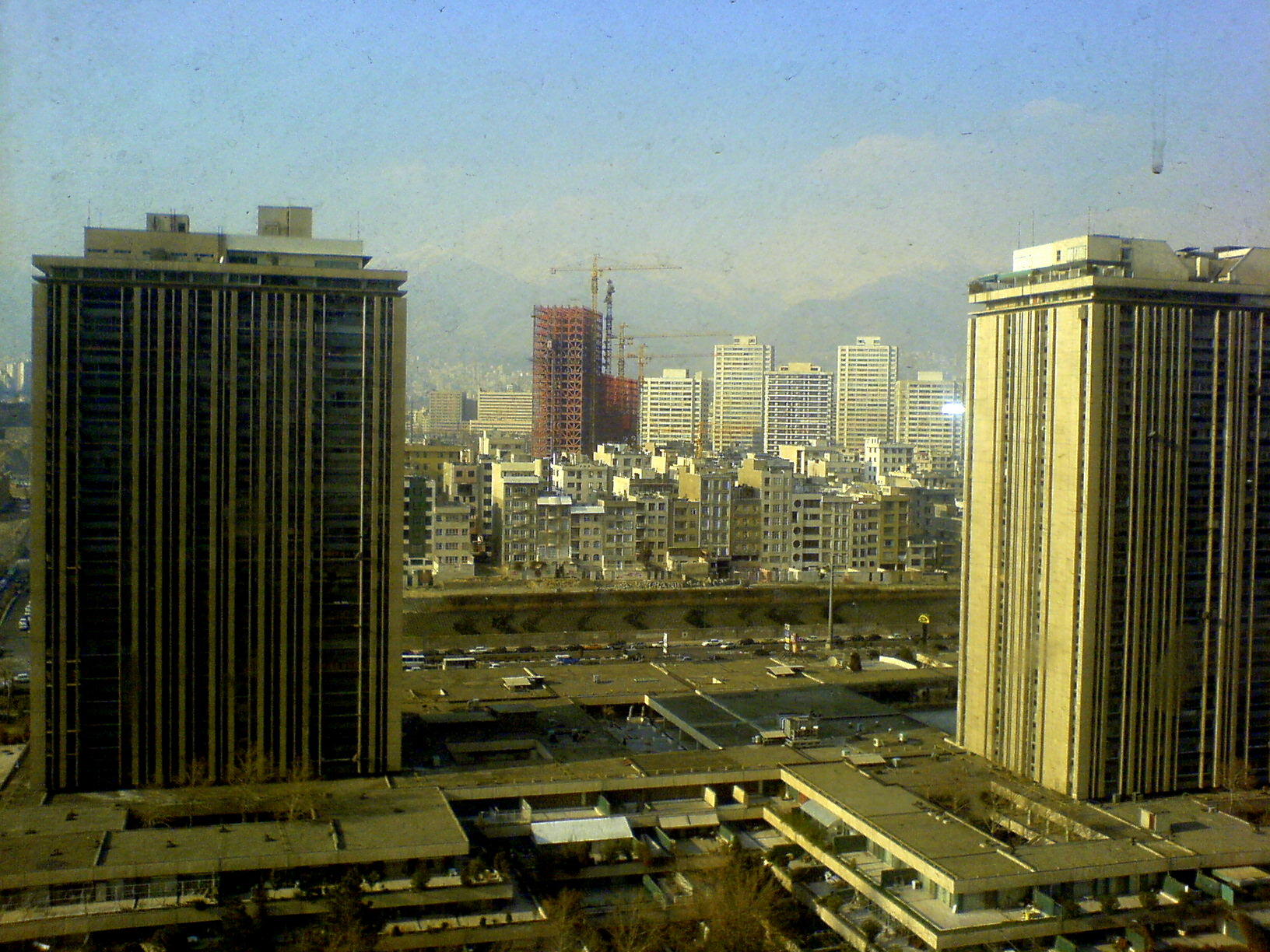
- The complex in 2007

- Location in Tehran Location in Iran

General information
- Status: Completed
- Location: Corner of Kordestan and Hakim Highways; Amir Abad, Tehran, Iran
- Coordinates: 35.74457°N 51.39914°E
- Inaugurated: 1976

Design and construction
- Civil engineer: Mojtaba Soltani
- Main contractor: A.S.P. Construction Company
- Designations: A.S.P, A stood for Assadi, S for Soltani, P for Panahpour

A.S.P. Towers (Persian: ساختمان های آ. اس. پ.)، also known as Kooy-e Nobonyad-e Vanak, are amongst the most well-known buildings in Tehran, Iran, located in the neighbourhood of Amir Abad.

Among the first residential high-rises in Iran, the complex is known for having been the residence of many well-known Iranian figures, including Amir-Abbas Hoveyda, prime-minister under Mohammad Reza Pahlavi. Construction was carried out by A.S.P construction company and is believed to have started in the mid-1960s and completed in 1976. The complex was inaugurated by the then Shahbanu of Iran, Farah Pahlavi, in the same year.

The complex consists of three buildings A, B, and C, with building A being the most luxurious of the three. The buildings are a landmark of Tehran and a major fixture of the city's skyline, with panoramic views of the Alborz Mountain Range and the Damavand peak to the east and the Milad Tower to the west.

== Current use ==
The complex is still occupied and used today, with staggering prices for apartments inside the towers. The complex includes a gym, a kindergarten and a swimming pool.

Dozens of cafes, restaurants, and stores are located on the ground floor of the complex and are accessible to the public.

== Notable residents ==
- Amir-Abbas Hoveyda, Prime minister of Iran under Mohammad Reza Shah
- Issa Omidvar, Famous world explorer and First Asian explorer of Antarctica
- Colonel Hasan Jalali, Imperial Iranian Air Force, Royal flight instructor
- Shapour Bakhtiar, Last Prime minister of Iran under Mohammad Reza Shah

== Trivia ==
- The three buildings are 24 stories tall and not 22 as suggested by the elevators. The 23rd and 24th floors include penthouses not serviced by the lifts.
- Before the Iranian Revolution sales of any units were subject to investigation and approval by the SAVAK.
- Prime minister Shapour Bakhtiar spent the night in ASP after the collapse of the Pahlavi dynasty on the night of 11 February 1979 (22 Bahman 1357). Unbeknown to him, his Health Minister Manouchehr Razmara was also seeking refuge there at the same night. The two never met.
