= Mahmoud Jafarian =

Iranian politician (1928–1979)

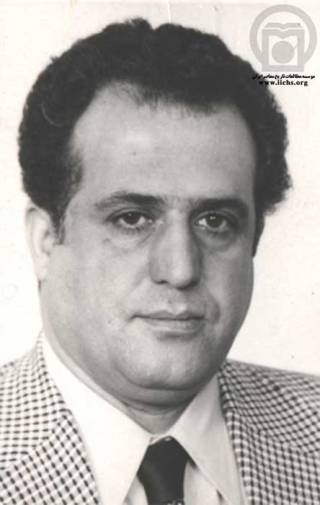
Mahmoud Jafarian in 1978

Mahmoud Jafarian (Persian: محمود جعفریان; October 1928 – 13 March 1979) was an Iranian politician under the last Shah of Iran, Mohammad Reza Pahlavi. He served simultaneously as deputy director for National Iranian Radio and Television (NIRT), managing director of Pars News Agency, and Vice President of the Rastakhiz Party.

Following the Iranian Revolution in 1979, Jafarian was ordered executed by Sadegh Khalkhali who was selected by Ruhollah Khomeini as Chief Justice of the newly formed Islamic Revolutionary Court. No lawyer or jury was made available and the court's death sentence was carried out less than two hours after the verdict. Jafarian was executed by firing squad at Evin Prison on 13 March 1979. He is buried at Behesht-e Zahra cemetery.

Jafarian had been a member of Tudeh Party, but later recanted and worked with the SAVAK.
