= Parviz Nikkhah =

Iranian political activist (1939–1979)

- پرویز نیکخواه
- Born: April/May 1939; Tehran, Imperial State of Iran
- Died: 13 March 1979 (aged 39); Tehran, Iran
- Cause of death: Executed
- Organization: Confederation of Iranian Students
- Political party: Tudeh Party
- Movement: Communism (earlier); Monarchism (later)

Parviz Nikkhah (Persian: پرویز نیکخواه; April/May 1939 – 13 March 1979) was initially a leftist political activist and one of the main leaders of the Confederation of Iranian Students — one of the most important opposition groups to Mohammad Reza Pahlavi in Europe and the United States — who changed his mind in prison and became one of the country's theorists. As such, he was the target of hatred and accusations from his former associates. After the 1979 Iranian Revolution, he was arrested at the instigation of the same people and executed without a fair trial, like thousands of others executed at the time.

== Biography ==
=== The Confederation of Iranian Students ===
After four years of studying physics, Parviz Nikkhah graduated from the University of Manchester with a bachelor's degree. During his time at university he had risen to become the undisputed leader of Iranian students abroad, being the star speaker at both the 2nd Congress of the CIS in London (1961) and also at the 3rd Congress of the CIS in Paris (1962). During this time, he had broken ideologically from the Tudeh Party line and become a member of the newly founded "Revolutionary Organization of the Tudeh Party" (ROTP), a Maoist group that rejected the "revisionist course" of the Soviet Union. The aim of the group was to carry the "armed struggle" into Iran and to organize a peasant uprising there along the lines of the Chinese Communist Revolution. In 1964, Parviz Nikkhah was one of the first to declare himself ready to return to Iran and "lead the masses in the revolutionary struggle against the Shah regime". Parviz Nikkhah had previously accepted an invitation to the People's Republic of China to receive ideological education and training in guerrilla warfare.

According to Nikkhah and his comrades, Iran was "ripe for a revolution" in the 1960s. If it were possible to forge an alliance between workers and peasants led by a revolutionary party, it could be possible to overthrow the Shah and found a Maoist “People's Republic of Iran”, the young revolutionaries thought. Back in Iran, Parviz Nikkhah took a position as a physics lecturer at the Amir Kabir University in Tehran and began his underground work as a revolutionary parallel to his teaching activities. He recruited students for the ROTP, sent them to China for further training and discussed the planned popular uprising with workers and peasants. After a few months he wrote a report for his comrades in Europe on the foundations of the revolutionary struggle in Iran. The reality looked completely different from what the revolutionaries had imagined in their plans. The peasants wanted nothing to do with the "armed struggle" and the workers were also not very enthusiastic about the prospects of a Maoist people's republic. In his report to his friends from the Confederation, the physicist Parviz Nikkhah spoke of a paradigm shift that had to be carried out, which roughly meant that the "armed struggle" was canceled for the time being.

On 10 April 1965 there was an attack on Mohammad Reza Pahlavi with serious consequences for Parviz Nikkhah. Nikkhah was arrested along with several other members of the ROTP and brought to justice. There was no concrete evidence that Parviz Nikkhah's group was involved in the attack, but it turned out that the SAVAK had been monitoring Parviz Nikkhah's group for a long time and had sufficient documents to identify him as a member a terrorist organization and to be able to charge as such. During the trial, Parviz Nikkhah made no secret of his rejection of the monarchy, but denied any involvement in the attack. “I'm a Marxist-Leninist, that's why I'm against the Shah. Terrorism is not part of my conviction."

=== From revolutionary to Shah supporter ===
After much discussion with his family, Parviz Nikkhah came to the conclusion that he should go directly to the Shah a second time to inform him of his new political ideas. He wrote a letter in which he apologized for the mistakes he had made in the past and described his previous ideological position as "absurd". He offered to make his new political views public. Nikkhah wrote an article about the positive effects of the land reform implemented as part of the White Revolution, which was published uncensored in the daily Kayhan.

In a 1968 televised interview, he explained his personal history and why he now believed the views he had held in the past to be wrong. He praised the politics of the Shah and advocated a “united front” against the “enemies of progress” (meaning the conservative clergy). He offered a criticism of his previous ideological standpoint and called on the students of the Confederation, instead of fighting against the Shah, to use their energies for the construction and development of Iran.

After the television interview, Parviz Nikkhah was released from prison. He began to work for the Ministry of Information and later for National Iranian Radio and Television (NIRT).

=== The Islamic Revolution ===
During the Iranian Revolution, Parviz Nikkhah was arrested and charged with authoring an anti-Khomeini article entitled Iran and Red and Black Colonization, which appeared in the Ettela'at newspaper on 7 January 1978. As during his earlier trial under the Shah, he had once again been charged with an act he was innocent of. He attempted to defend himself, arguing that he could not have written the article, and tried to justify his reasons for cooperation with the Shah's government. Despite his pleas he was once again sentenced to death, but this time there was no way to get a reprieve. On 13 March 1979, only a month after Ruhollah Khomeini's return to Iran, Parviz Nikkhah was executed.

Mehdi Khanbaba Tehrani, one of the founders of the Confederation, recently stated:

“I think the student movement had gradually moved completely away from Iranian society and its real problems. The movement promoted an image of the poor Iranian peasant who lived on only a few dates, as was perhaps the case in the times of Ahmad Shah or Reza Shah. In our minds, reforms and revolution were incompatible. We believed, for example, that the Shah only granted women in Iran their civil liberties in order to make them into bourgeois puppets. We thought how can women be free if the Iranian people as a whole were not free? Such considerations led us into an alliance with Khomeini, without thinking that the freedom rights that the Shah had enforced for women were not sufficient but at least an improvement. ... The confederation was an organization based on an absolute rejection (of the existing system) ... The members of the confederation did not belong to a society-rooted opposition movement with theoretically founded revolutionary ideas. They were idealists who opposed social inequality and whose enemy was the person of the Shah ... They ultimately had no in-depth knowledge of Iran and there was a certain fear of seriously discussing the question of the Shah's reforms. It could have been that we would have lost our image of the enemy."

== Bibliography ==
- Afkhami, Gholam Reza (2009). The Life and Times of the Shah. Berkeley, California: University of California Press. ISBN 9780520253285. OCLC 955126406.
- Milani, Abbas (2008). Eminent Persians: the men and women who made modern Iran, 1941-1979. Syracuse, New York: Syracuse University Press. OCLC 1226753784.
