= Sadeq Amani =

Iranian activist (1930-1965)

Personal life
- Born: Mohammad Sadegh Amani c. 1930 Tehran, Persia
- Died: 16 June 1965 (aged 35) Tehran, Iran
- Cause of death: Execution by firing squad
- Political party: Fada'iyan-e Islam
- Occupation: activist • politician

Religious life
- Religion: Islam
- Denomination: Shi'a
- Jurisprudence: Ja'fari

Mohammad Sadeq Amani (Persian: محمدصادق امانی) was an Iranian political activist. He was a member of both Fada'iyan-e Islam and the Islamic Coalition Party. Amani was involved in the January 1965 assassination of Hassan Ali Mansur, Prime Minister of Iran during the Shah Mohammad Reza Pahlavi administration. He was later executed by the regime for his part in the assassination.

== Life and career ==
Born in 1930 in Tehran, Iran, Amani was an Iranian Shia Muslim who worked in the local market and was a student of theology. He was a Mujtahid (a person accepted as an original authority in Islamic law in finding a solution to a legal question) and was known as a teacher of ethics.

In his youth, Amani joined the group of Fada'iyan-e Islam. He had a political tendency towards Navvab Safavi and Kashani. He was a founder and active member of the group Shi'ayan.

== 1963 demonstrations in Iran ==
Sadeq Amani had a significant role in organizing the 1963 demonstrations in Iran and helped plan the 1965 assassination of Hassan Ali Mansur, the prime minister of the Shah. Amani was arrested after Mansur's assassination and was executed by the regime of the Shah on June 16, 1965.

== See also ==
- Fada'iyan-e Islam
- Islamic Coalition Party
- Navvab Safavi
- Mohammad Bokharaei
