= Asadollah Alam =

Prime minister of Iran from 1962 to 1964

- اسدالله علم
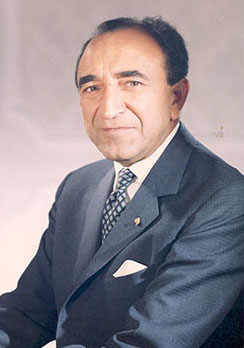
- Alam in the 1960s

Minister of Royal Court
- In office 1 February 1967 – 7 August 1977
- Monarch: Mohammad Reza Pahlavi
- Prime Minister: Amir-Abbas Hoveyda
- Preceded by: Hossein Ghods-Nakhai
- Succeeded by: Amir-Abbas Hoveyda

President of Pahlavi University
- In office 18 March 1964 – 16 September 1968
- Preceded by: Lotfali Souratgar
- Succeeded by: Houchang Nahavandi

35th Prime Minister of Iran
- In office 19 July 1962 – 7 March 1964
- Monarch: Mohammad Reza Pahlavi
- Preceded by: Ali Amini
- Succeeded by: Hassan Ali Mansur

Minister of Interior
- In office 7 April 1955 – 3 April 1957
- Monarch: Mohammad Reza Pahlavi
- Prime Minister: Hossein Ala'
- Preceded by: Fazlollah Zahedi (acting)
- Succeeded by: Fathollah Jalali

Secretary-General of the People's Party
- In office 1957–1960
- Preceded by: Office Established
- Succeeded by: Yahya Adl

Minister of Labor
- In office 20 November 1950 – March 1951
- Monarch: Mohammad Reza Pahlavi
- Prime Minister: Ali Razmara
- Preceded by: Gholamhossein Forouhar
- Succeeded by: Habib Nafisi

Minister of Agriculture
- In office 14 January 1950 – 26 June 1950
- Monarch: Mohammad Reza Pahlavi
- Prime Minister: Mohammad Sa'ed; Ali Mansur
- Preceded by: Ahmad Moqbel
- Succeeded by: Ebrahim Mahdavi

Governor of Sistan and Baluchestan province
- In office 3 September 1947 – 14 January 1950
- Monarch: Mohammad Reza Pahlavi
- Prime Minister: Ahmad Qavam; Ebrahim Hakimi; Abdolhossein Hazhir; Mohammad Sa'ed

Personal details
- Born: 24 July 1919 Birjand, Sublime State of Iran
- Died: 14 April 1978 (aged 58) New York City, U.S.
- Resting place: Imam Reza shrine
- Party: Rastakhiz Party (1975–1978)
- Other political affiliations: People's Party (1957–1975)
- Spouse: Malektaj Qavam
- Children: 2

Asadollah Alam (Persian: اسدالله علم; 24 July 1919 – 14 April 1978) was an Iranian politician who was prime minister under Mohammad Reza Shah from 1962 to 1964. He was also Minister of Royal Court, president of Pahlavi University and governor of Sistan and Baluchestan province.

== Early life ==
Alam was born on 24 July 1919 in Birjand to a family of Khorasani Arab origin and was educated at a British school in Iran. By a royal order from Reza Shah, Alam married Malektaj, the daughter of Qavam Al-Molk Shirazi. The son of Qavam ol-molk was then married to a sister of the Shah, Ashraf Pahlavi. Shortly after deposing the Qajar dynasty, Reza Shah intended to unite Iran's non-Qajar nobility through inter-marriage.

At the age of 28, he was appointed governor of Sistan and Baluchestan province. At the age of 30, he became Minister of Agriculture in the cabinet of Mohammad Sa'ed. He early on displayed what an American acquaintance describes as a combination of native toughness and YMCA dedication.

Assadollah Alam became the main landowner of Birjand after his father's death. He was one of Iran's first big landowners to distribute his holdings to the peasants, insisting that his servants eat the same food as his family. Once, when a would-be assassin was nabbed outside his door, Alam gave the man $40, then had him thrashed and sent into the street without his pants. Amir Asadollah Alam was one of the longest serving minister of the Pahlavi era. The title amir (also transliterated "emir") is Arabic for ruler or governor. The name Alam means a banner or a flag in Arabic. Alam's father Amir Ebrahim Alam (AKA Shokat ol-molk) was the governor of the region of Qa'enaat. In the era of Reza Shah Pahlavi he was the Minister of Telecommunications.

== Premiership ==
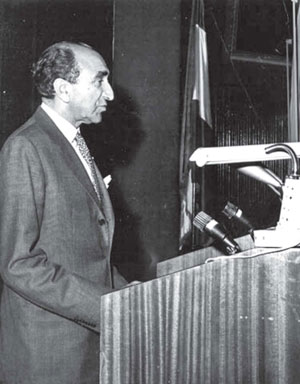
Alam speaking in his campaign during legislative election of 1961

In 1953, Alam helped organize the coup (also known as the CIA and MI6 backed Operation Ajax) that overthrew Dr. Mohammad Mosaddegh. Alam was subsequently made the director of the Pahlavi Foundation, a charitable trust worth at least $133 million, set up by the Shah to finance social-welfare plans out of the profits from royal holdings in banks, industries, hotels. In 1962, he became prime minister at the age of 43.

As prime minister, Assadollah Alam pledged to undertake "an anticorruption campaign with great diligence and all severity." Though the cynics snickered, Alam got free rein from the Shah, and carefully began building airtight cases against suspected grafters among Iran's leading bureaucrats and government leaders. His first major target was General Mohammed Ali Khazai, the Iranian army's chief of ordnance, who had parlayed his $6,000 salary into three houses in the suburbs of Tehran, four apartment houses in France, five automobiles, $100,000 in European banks and $200,000 in cash. A military court convicted Khazai of taking a cut out of government contracts and sentenced him to five years of solitary confinement.

In May 1963, Alam's anti-corruption drive was in full swing. In Tehran, a military tribunal sentenced General Abdollah Hedayat, Iran's first four-star general and once a close advisor of the Shah, to two years in prison for embezzling money on military housing contracts, brushed aside his plea for appeal with the brusque explanation that "more charges are pending." The former boss of the Tehran Electricity Board was in solitary confinement for five years; cases were in preparation against an ex-war minister and twelve other generals for graft.

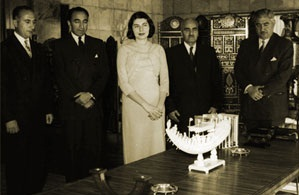
Alam (second from left) with Queen Soraya Esfandiary

=== Riots of 1963 ===
The most important event in Alam's premiership was the riots that took place in June 1963 in response to some of the reforms enforced by the Shah and Alam. It was the clerics who triggered the riots during the Muharram holy days. As the faithful jammed the mosques, the clerics assailed "illegal" Cabinet decisions and urged their followers to "protect your religion". Small-scale riots, led by Ruhollah Khomeini, quickly broke out in the clerical capital of Qom and in several other cities. Police struck back, arrested Khomeini and some 15 other ringleaders. With that, both sides declared open war and the battle was on.

Screaming "Down with the Shah", 10,000 people, swept through the capital, carrying pictures of Khomeini. Though the whereabouts of the Shah were kept secret, rows of white-helmeted troops, backed by tanks, immediately sealed off access to royal palaces in the city and suburbs. In the heart of the town green, they fired for 40 minutes. When the mobs entered government buildings, the troops opened up at point-blank range. The crowd fell back in confusion, regrouped, and raced down main avenues.

Nearly 7,000 troops were called out by Alam's government to restore peace, albeit an uneasy one, in Tehran; by then damage was estimated in the millions, at least 1,000 were injured, and the officially reported death toll was 86. It was undoubtedly higher, but since the public cemetery was closed and under heavy guard to prevent further clashes at gravesides, the real number remained unknown. In his memoirs, Alam notes the number of the dead to be about 200, saying that he immediately arranged for their families to receive a pension from the government. For the first time in a decade, martial law was imposed on the city, along with a dusk-to-dawn curfew. Hoping to preserve quiet for a while, Alam also announced that troops would remain on emergency duty. Their orders: shoot to kill.

== Minister of the Royal Court ==
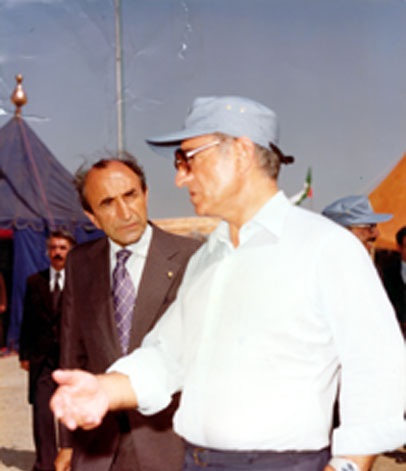
Alam speaking with Mohammad Reza Shah

In 1964, he was appointed as chancellor of Pahlavi University and a few years later served host to the King of Belgium in his visit to Fars province. Beginning in December 1966 he was the minister of court for many years. Furthermore, he was the head and bursar of the Pahlavi Foundation. He was also a supporter of the campaign of Richard Nixon, during the United States presidential elections.

As the minister of the Royal Court he was the closest man to Mohammad Reza Pahlavi, who now ran the country autocratically. Therefore, Alam became the channel through which most of the daily affairs of the country passed. Alam's memoirs, published posthumously, are detailed documents on the life and the deeds of the Shah as perceived by an insider.

== List of positions held ==
As written by Alam himself in his memoirs in 1972.

1. Manager of Imam Reza Shrine in Mashhad, AKA "Aastaan-e Qods-e Razavi"
2. The Shah's inspector of all universities
3. Chairman of the board of trustees of the Pahlavi University
4. Chairman of the board of trustees of the Aryamehr University
5. Chairman of the board of trustees of the Pars School for Higher Education (Madreseye Aalyi-e Pars)
6. The Shah's special liaison with foreign ambassadors (for issues too confidential to pass through the Foreign Ministry)
7. Head of the board of trustees of the Mashad University
8. Indispensable member of the board of trustees of the University of Tehran
9. Indispensable member of the board of trustees of the University of Tabriz
10. Chairman of the Royal Horse Institute (Crown Prince Reza Pahlavi was the honorary head)
11. Chairman of the royal institute of the Rural Culture Houses (Crown Prince Reza Pahlavi was the honorary head)
12. Chairman of the National Scouts Committee
13. Head of Kaanun-e Kaar (Labor Institute)
14. Deputy chairman of the Imperial Organization of Social Services (IOSS) (Princess Ashraf Pahlavi was the head)
15. Deputy chairman of the Red Lion and Sun Society (Princess Shams Pahlavi was the head)
16. Chairman of the Council for Support of Mothers and Infants
17. Deputy chairman of the Kaanun-e Parvaresh-e Fekri-e Kudakaan va nojavaanaan (Institute for the Intellectual Development of Children and Young Adults) (Empress Farah Pahlavi was the head)
18. Direct chief of the Legion of Service to Humanity
19. Person in charge of the construction in the island of Kish
20. Head of the board of trustees of the Pahlavi Foundation
21. Deputy chairman of the Iranian Culture Foundation (for research and publication of classic Persian texts)
22. In charge of the Shah's personal and monetary affairs
23. Minister of court
24. Cooperation in establishing University of Birjand

== Illness and death ==
Asadollah Alam was diagnosed with cancer in the late 1960s. He died at New York University Hospital in New York City in 1978, less than a year before the Iranian Revolution.

== See also ==
- Pahlavi dynasty
- List of prime ministers of Iran

Political offices
Preceded by Hossein Ghods-Nakhai	Minister of Royal Court; 1967–1977	Succeeded by Amir-Abbas Hoveyda
Preceded by Ali Amini	Prime Minister of Iran; 1962–1964	Succeeded by Hassan Ali Mansur
Party political offices
Preceded by Office established	Secretary-General of People's Party; 1957–1960	Succeeded by Yahya Adl
Academic offices
Preceded by Lotfali Souratgar	President of Pahlavi University; 1964–1968	Succeeded by Houchang Nahavandi
