= Amir-Abbas Hoveyda =

Prime Minister of Iran from 1965 to 1977

- امیرعباس هویدا
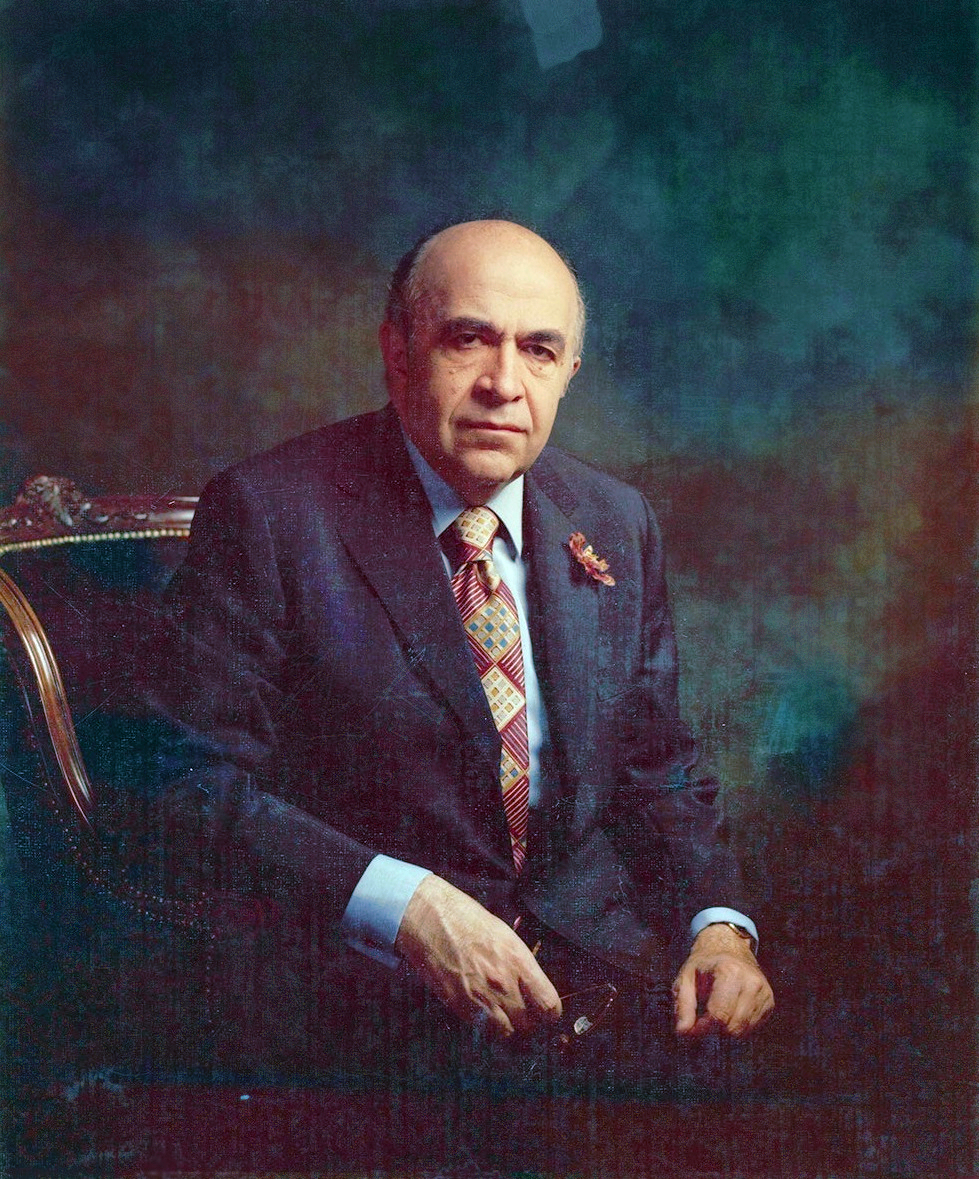
- Official portrait, c. 1973

37th Prime Minister of Iran
- In office 26 January 1965 – 7 August 1977
- Monarch: Mohammad Reza Pahlavi
- Preceded by: Hassan-Ali Mansur
- Succeeded by: Jamshid Amouzegar

1st Secretary-General of the Rastakhiz Party
- In office 2 March 1975 – 28 October 1976
- Deputy: Fereydoun Mahdavi
- Preceded by: Party established
- Succeeded by: Jamshid Amouzegar

Minister of Finance
- In office 7 March 1964 – 1 February 1965
- Prime Minister: Hassan-Ali Mansur
- Preceded by: Kamal Hassani
- Succeeded by: Jamshid Amouzegar

Minister of Royal Court
- In office 7 August 1977 – 6 November 1978
- Prime Minister: Jamshid Amouzegar; Jafar Sharif-Emami
- Preceded by: Asadollah Alam
- Succeeded by: Ali Gholi Ardalan

Personal details
- Born: 18 February 1919 Tehran, Sublime State of Iran
- Died: 7 April 1979 (aged 60) Tehran, Iran
- Cause of death: Gunshot wounds
- Resting place: Behesht-e Zahra Cemetery
- Party: Iran Novin Party (1964–1975); Rastakhiz Party (1975–1978)
- Spouse: Leila Emami (m. 1966; div. 1971)
- Relations: Fereydoon Hoveyda (brother)
- Education: Free University of Brussels
- Cabinet: First cabinet Sixth cabinet
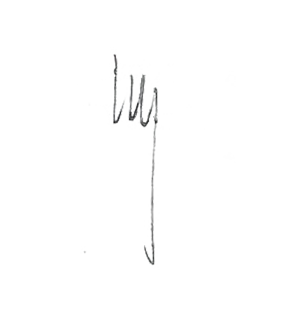
- Signature

Amir-Abbas Hoveyda (Note: Persian: امیرعباس هویدا, romanized: Amīr 'Abbās Hoveyda) (18 February 1919 – 7 April 1979) was an Iranian economist and politician who served as Prime Minister of Iran from 1965 to 1977 and Secretary-General of the Rastakhiz Party from 1975 to 1976. He was the longest-serving prime minister in Iran's history, serving in office for over 12 years. He also served as deputy prime minister and minister of finance in the cabinet of his predecessor, Hassan Ali Mansur.

== Early life and education ==
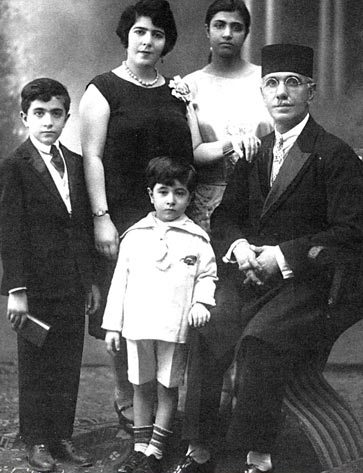
Hoveyda (left) with his family in Beirut, 1929

Amir-Abbas Hoveyda was born on 18 February 1919 in Tehran to Habibollah Hoveyda, a senior diplomat, and Afsar ol-Moluk, a descendant of the Qajar dynasty. Through his maternal family, he was the nephew of Abdol Hossein Sardari, later known as the "Iranian Schindler". Hoveyda's father was a lapsed adherent of the Baháʼí Faith; as a result, the family was secular.

At the time of his father's death in 1933, Hoveyda was living in Beirut, Lebanon, where he attended the Grand Lycée Franco-Libanais, a private school affiliated with the French government. As a teenager, he reportedly became a Francophile, enjoying literary works by the likes of Gide, Malraux, Molière, and Baudelaire. This influenced his choice to attend a French university in 1938, but amid a brewing diplomatic dispute between the French government and Reza Shah, he transferred to the Free University of Brussels in Belgium a year later. Hoveyda's studies were then disrupted by the outbreak of World War II and the subsequent German invasion of Belgium in May 1940. After a period of displacement, he was able to return to the university, obtaining a degree in political science in 1941 while the country remained under German occupation. Besides his native Persian, he learned to communicate in several languages, including French, English, German, Italian, and Arabic.

== Military and civil service (1942–1958) ==
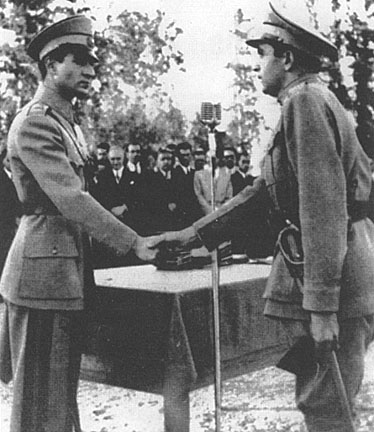
Hoveyda (right) as an army officer, meeting with Mohammad Reza Shah Pahlavi for the first time in 1943

Upon his return to Iran in 1942, Hoveyda rested for a few months before enlisting as a soldier in Iran's armed forces. Despite his aristocratic background, his plan at the time was to use his experience as a conscript to supplement his seniority at the Ministry of Foreign Affairs, where he applied for employment prior to being drafted and was later confirmed. Because of his higher education, Hoveyda was able to bypass boot camp and directly enter the Officer's School.

During his time working for the Foreign Ministry, Hoveyda befriended many elements of Iranian high society, including the likes of Sadegh Hedayat and Sadegh Choubak. In August 1944, he accepted a position to accompany Zeinolabedin Rahnema, Iran's minister plenipotentiary, to France, and to stay at the Iranian embassy there. In 1947, while working in Stuttgart, Hoveyda was assigned the task of negotiating over deals made between Iran and West Germany. While there, he became friends with Abdollah Entezam, a diplomat with ties to the royal family.

In 1950, Hoveyda returned to Iran, to work as assistant director of the public relations office at the Foreign Ministry and executive secretary for Entezam, who was appointed the new chief minister. His tenure did not last long, however, as Mohammad Mossadegh was appointed prime minister, and dismissed all cabinet members. Leaving Iran once again in 1952 amid political violence, Hoveyda was able to secure a position with the United Nations High Commissioner for Refugees through the help of his European contacts. As a liaison officer, he was given the task of visiting various continents, including Asia, Africa, and the Americas, publicizing the plight of refugees and in effect receiving several commendations from high ranking United Nations officials. Upon Mossadegh's removal in 1953, the Embassy of Iran in Turkey would serve to be Hoveyda's final diplomatic position.

== Rise to power (1958–1965) ==
Hoveyda's rise to power involved many years of service within the ministry of foreign affairs, but this path took on a whole new approach once he joined the board of directors of the National Iranian Oil Company (NIOC) in 1958 at the behest of his patron Abdullah Entezam, who had by then assumed a high ranking position at the company. As managing director and special assistant to Entezam, Hoveyda used his experiences in the West to transform management-worker relations. As an example, he introduced innovative methods by which workers filed grievances in regard to any aspect of the working environment they deemed unsatisfactory, and helped to figuratively enmesh the roles of management and the labourers into a collective entity. One way he went about doing this was by eating many of his meals alongside wage labourers in the cafeteria. Although he advocated the emulation of Western models to improve overall productivity and worker relations, Hoveyda was very outspoken in favour of expelling foreign technicians and attracting indigenous sources of labour. The NIOC's periodical, Kavosh, was first published during his tenure. What is unique about this magazine is that it was, initially, virtually void of any semblance of the growing cult of personality which surrounded the Shah.

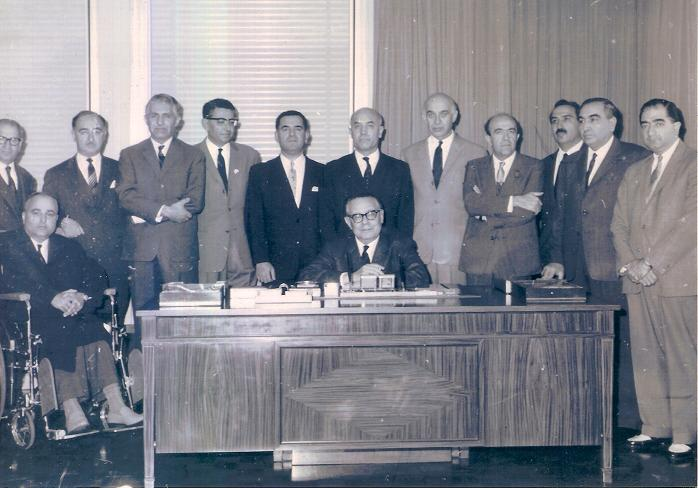
Hoveyda as National Iranian Oil Company Board member, 4th from the right

Continuing his duties as managing director at the NIOC, Hoveyda also helped Hassan Ali Mansour in establishing a semi-independent group of highly trained, Western educated, and young technocrats. The organization's main goal was to devise methods of rectifying the nation's ailing economy. Known as the Progressive Circle, this government-sponsored dowreh ("Persian for a gathering held at regular intervals") was a deliberate attempt by the shah to thin out the older generation of politicians with a new 'progressive' crop. With its inception in 1959, the Circle acted in conjunction with a similar government commission called the Plan Organization. Hoveyda would play a major leadership role in the Circle and would be the catalyst behind much of its recruitment efforts.

Besides experience and patronage, Freemasonry was seen by many politicians at the time as a supplemental credit toward obtaining high-ranking government positions. There is no doubt that many members of the Foroughi Lodge, the chapter Hoveyda would eventually join, harboured and produced many influential politicians of Iran's modern era. Hoveyda became a freemason in 1960 believing that his mere association with the organization would help propel him into the national spotlight. Hoveyda would succeed in this regard, but the attention he received was anything but positive. Freemasonry in Iran has always been seen as an extension of British imperialism, and with rumours surrounding Hoveyda's religious persuasion, opportunities to attack Hoveyda's character were not taken for granted by his political adversaries during his years as head of foreign policy and Prime Minister. It is well documented that Court Minister Asadollah Alam and General Nasiri of SAVAK, Iran's domestic security and intelligence service, helped expedite the publication of key controversial books against Freemasonry, referencing Hoveyda in each piece. Rumours were also spread by his detractors that he was a Baháʼí, a persecuted religion in Iran, but both he and the Shah denied that he was a Baháʼí.

== Prime Minister of Iran (1965–1977) ==
When the Progressive Circle soon became a political entity in the form of the Iran Novin (New Iran) Party in 1963, Hoveyda would be thrust into the national scene. Serving as Minister of Finance under Prime Minister Hassan Ali Mansour in 1964, the now well seasoned Hoveyda would make his mark by acting as the cabinet's intellectual center. Many observers, both within and outside Iran, would take note of Hoveyda's prudent behaviour and shrewdness. To many, he embodied the archetypical statesman. Hoveyda's positive attributes would again be shrouded by scandal and gossip. During the early months of Mansour's premiership, the government was attacked for ratifying a bill which allowed foreigners extraterritorial rights. More specifically, those who benefited from the law were U.S. military personnel and their dependents. These "capitulation rights" would have a negative impact on the way government at the time was seen by the populace. Because the actions of the government were, by law, reflective of the sitting cabinet at the time, disregarding individual ministerial involvement, hoveyda was also blamed for the bill's implementation even though he was not directly involved in its drafting.

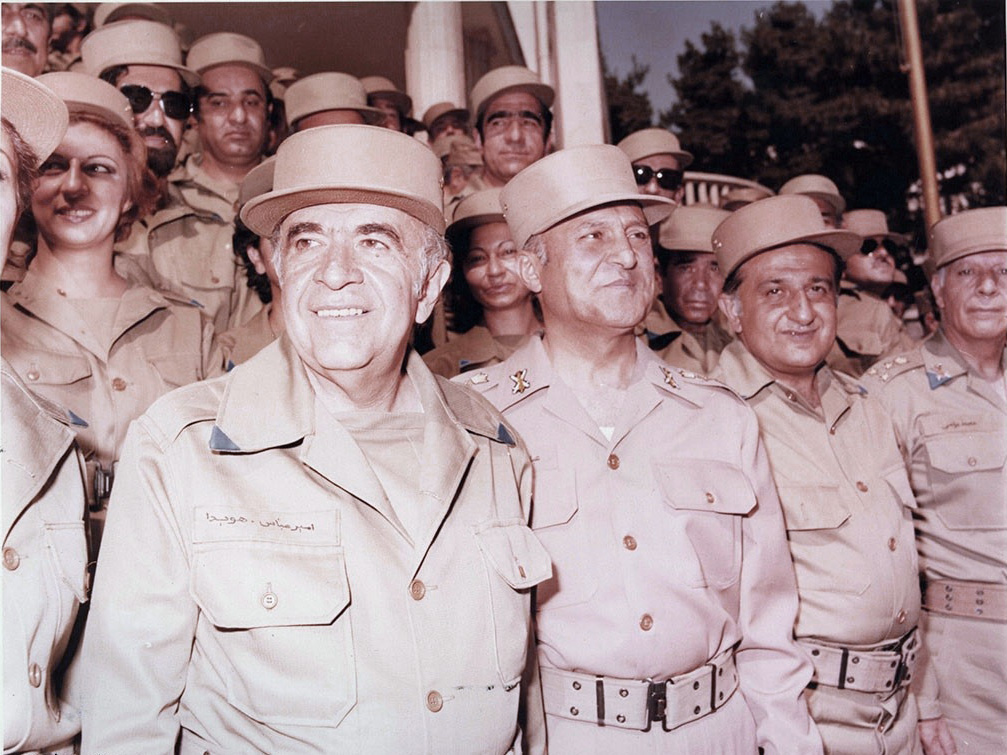
Hoveyda with members of Iran's armed forces, 1970

An attempt on Mansour's life on 21 January 1965, by a seventeen-year-old devotee of the Fada'yan-e Islam, and Mansour's death in hospital five days later, would completely alter Hoveyda's future. As he personally reported the news to an obviously distraught shah, he was ordered to formulate a cabinet. Hoveyda would replace the deceased Mansour as the longest serving premier in Iran's modern history. The sense of autonomy seen among past prime ministers such as Ali Amini, Haj Ali Razmara, and Mohammad Mosaddegh, had been systematically marginalized by the autocratic Mohammad Reza Shah. In his rather successful campaign at consolidating power, the king maintained his international image as a constitutional monarch, but Hoveyda's tenure as PM attests to how this portrayal was not an objective reflection of circumstances. Hoveyda's premiership would be the pivot behind his resistance to such powerlessness. Hoveyda became a household name in Iran through the constant character assassination he received by Towfigh Magazine, Iran's most popular political satire magazine. Hoveyda was largely unknown among the population of Iran before Towfigh publicized him. He was caricatured in Towfigh's weekly magazine carrying a cane (caused by a traffic accident in which he was involved), wearing one carnation in his suit jacket pocket, and smoking a pipe. Towfigh Magazine referred to him as "The Caned One" and even devoted an entire book dedicated to exposing his flaws as a premier entitled "Assa-Nameh". The magazine (and Iranian media in general) frequently criticized and lampooned Hoveyda, primarily because they intended to criticize the Shah himself, but were unable to directly do so due to censorship. Eventually Hoveyda, by order of the Shah, forever shut down Towfigh Magazine in 1971 due to Towfigh Magazine's heavy criticism of the Shah's corruption and policies. This was despite the fact that Hoveyda publicly claimed that criticism of the government was to be encouraged, and whereby any restriction of press freedoms had to be by court order through the judiciary and not by unilateral orders of the government.

The first half of Hoveyda's premiership is marked by a sense of optimism. As already mentioned, in 1966, Hoveyda attempted to allure many elements of the intellectual community, as well as the opposition, into an informal agreement with the regime. Although talks between the two sides eventually broke down, Hoveyda never lost sight of what a partnership between the two could have accomplished. His pragmatic approach to politics allowed him to envision an incremental reform process that could be carried out through action. This is contrary to the path assumed by many Iranian intellectuals at the time, which involved quixotic solutions to problems such as electoral corruption and media censorship. Hoveyda resumed many of the reform initiatives set out by the Mansour administration. In particular, reform plans that were laid out by the Shah in the White Revolution. Although a secularist, he would even allocate government revenue to the clerical establishment. The clerical establishment was seen as a bulwark against Communism by the Shah, and was constantly reinforced (a policy that the Shah would later regret).

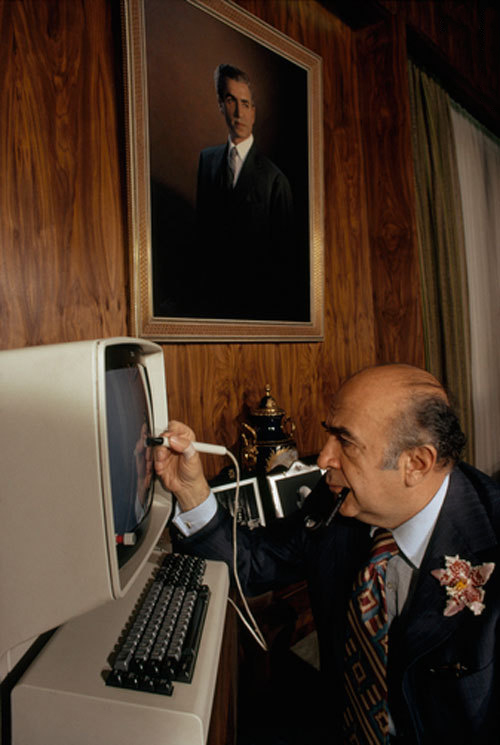
Hoveyda working with an IBM 2250 in his office, 1975

Hoveyda's plan to crack down on corruption became an example of the entrenched ineptitude of many in power. Many important members of the government were corrupt, and the Shah was consistently flattered and schmoozed by them and turned a blind eye to the problem. The Shah began receiving an increasingly distorted picture of Iranian society, while becoming completely blind to increasing frustration to this rule by regular Iranians, as well as the shortcomings of his own government. Hoveyda's inability to move forward with his personal mandate eventually turned the overtly optimistic prime minister into a cynic. After years of political maneuvering, most of his proposed initiatives were stonewalled by bureaucratic obstacles. During the 1970s, the now veteran prime minister became nonchalant when it came to following through with his own convictions. His earlier aggression towards the dysfunctions of an intrusive system slowly turned into feigned support. Publicly, Hoveyda assumed the notion that the regime in its current state would eventually reform on its own, and that political liberalization was only a small issue in the grand scheme of modernization. In private, Hoveyda often lamented over Iran's conditions, admitting to insufficiencies of the state and his own political impotence. The powerlessness of the premier's office was coupled with intricate internal rivalries. Hoveyda had an intensely rough relationship with the likes of Asadollah Alam and Ardeshir Zahedi, son of the famed participant in the 1953 coup against Mossadegh, General Fazlollah Zahedi.

== Later life ==
=== Minister of the Royal Court (1977–1978) ===
On 2 March 1975, the Shah dissolved the Iran Novin Party and its opposition elements in creating a single party system headed by the Rastakhiz (Resurgence/Resurrection) Party. In relation to Hoveyda, it is believed that the Shah was being threatened by the growing influence wielded by party officials, with Hoveyda being the most notable. The growth of an independent apparatus was contrary to the Shah's contrivance involving the consolidation of all power. Hoveyda's inability to garner any type of power base in government allowed him to concentrate much of his energy on developing the Iran Novin Party. The networks he had slowly developed over the years came to trouble the monarch. Although Hoveyda would be coerced into relinquishing his position as prime minister, he accepted a temporary intermediary role as secretary general of Rastakhiz before a new prime minister could be appointed. Nevertheless, the Shah still saw Hoveyda as a trusted (if not pliable) figure, and he was appointed minister of court. In her memoirs, Queen Farah wrote that asking Hoveyda to leave the post of prime minister was as painful as "giving birth to a baby".

Hoveyda would serve as minister of court within Jamshid Amouzegar's government in 1977. With this role, he would come to discover the pervasiveness of internal corruption, once concealed by Asadollah Alam and the team he had surrounded himself with. Nevertheless, he continued to tolerate the practice as well, while simultaneously remaining a trusted advisor to the Shah.

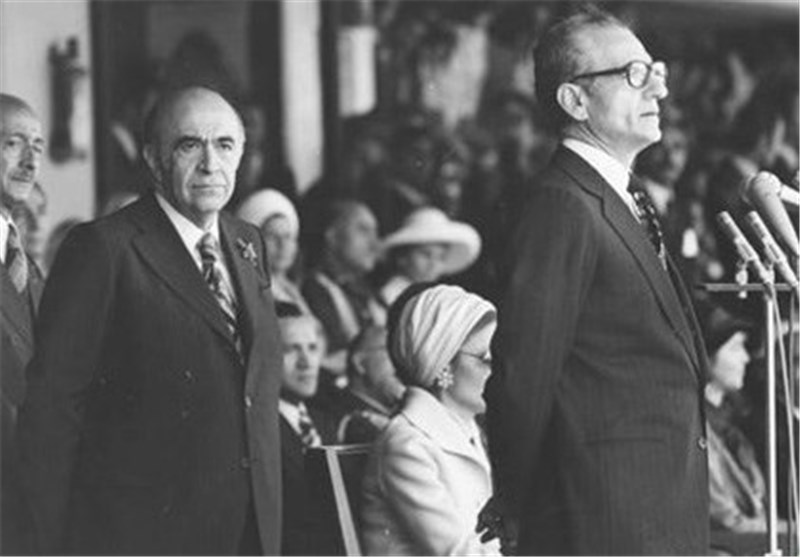
Hoveyda with the Shah, 1978

Hoveyda was alleged to have been the author of an article which attacked the opposition figure the Ayatollah Ruhollah Khomeini as being a British agent and a liar, which was anonymously published in Kayhan newspaper in January 1978 on the Shah's orders. Whether or not the allegations were true, the article generated a major backlash among Khomeini's supporters, which eventually spiralled into the Iranian Revolution.

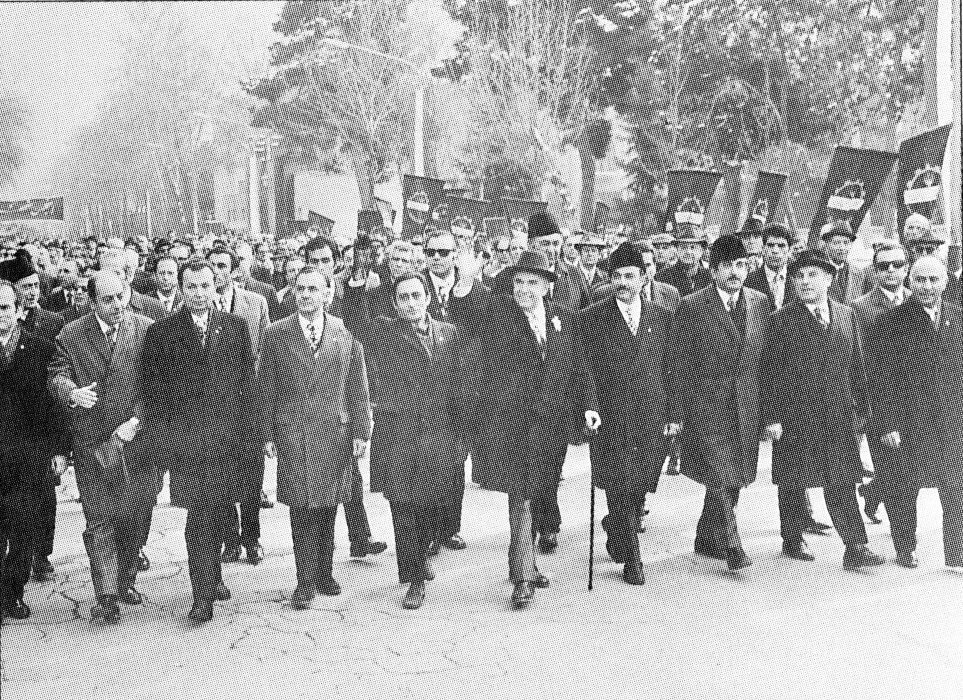
Hoveyda and his cabinet, 1974

At this point, the growing tide of revolution was becoming discernible, giving Hoveyda ample opportunity to leave the country before revolutionary forces could have had a chance to overthrow the monarchy. Aside from persistent efforts by family and friends to leave the country as quickly as possible, the Shah himself proposed hoveyda with an ambassadorial position to Belgium. His refusal to leave the country can be judged as being a result of naïveté or blind optimism, but hoveyda's decision can also be assessed from alternate angles. For one, he did not want to abandon his mother who was incapable of traveling at the time. On a more personal level, Hoveyda came to the conclusion that after years of self-exile, he would do all he could to remain in Iran. With all these points of rationale being considered, hoveyda actually came to believe that revolutionary fervour was capable of being contained and that everything would eventually straighten out, allowing the country to resume its present course.

In an effort to slow down the momentum of the revolution, the Shah was advised by many of his surrounding advisors to arrest hoveyda, using him as a scapegoat for the past-ills of the crumbling regime. Since Hoveyda was widely seen as a major cause of the revolution due to much of the bad press he had generated throughout the years by newspapers that wanted to indirectly attack the Shah's policies, they reasoned that the public would be appeased. In September, Hoveyda was forced to resign his position of Minister of Court. On 7 November 1978, Hoveyda was arrested together with other 60 former officials. He would be held under house arrest in an upper-Tehran residence often affiliated with SAVAK activity, and the Shah assumed that he would be put on trial, and freed after publicly vindicating himself.

However, once the Shah fled the country, the SAVAK (Iranian state security) agents assigned with the task of guarding Hoveyda, abandoned from their posts, leaving hoveyda vulnerable to arrest by revolutionary forces. Hoveyda refused requests by friends and relatives to flee Iran before it was too late, and instead turned himself over to the new authorities. Hoveyda believed that as the trial would be before an Islamic court, and that he personally had done nothing wrong, he would be acquitted.

=== Trial and execution (1979) ===
Hoveyda was taken to the Refah School, a temporary headquarters for the revolution's vanguard. Because of the departure of the Shah and much of the now former ruling class, Hoveyda had become the most prized prisoner of the old government. On 15 March 1979, he would face the newly established Revolutionary Court for the first time. During this time he attempted to create his legal arguments for the court. He was interviewed by Belgian journalist Christine Ockrent, a now infamous interview in which Hoveyda was subject to nearly accusatory questions by the interviewer.

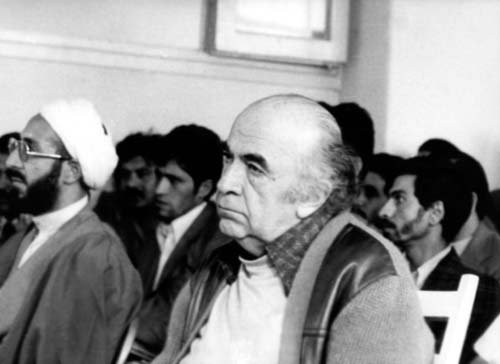
Hoveyda during his hearing at the Islamic Revolutionary Court, 1979

The clerical judge appointed by Khomeini, Sadegh Khalkhali, would come to be known as the 'Hanging Judge' for his violent approach to revolutionary justice. He was the head of the tribunal that had assembled to try the former prime minister. Prior to Hoveyda's trial, Khalkhali had already ordered the execution of dozens, possibly hundreds of political prisoners, and would eventually be responsible for thousands of executions. Traditional conventions of the judiciary had all but been abandoned during the trials of Hoveyda and countless others. Among many of the anomalous traits personified by the trial, the court ignored notions of due process, impartiality of the judge, or allowing the defendant to consult legal options. Many pundits have come to conclude that the verdict was already made by the Ayatollah Khomeini before the trial ever commenced. Khalkhali's indictment of Hoveyda was as follows:

Amir Abbas Hoveyda, son of Habibollah, birth certificate number 3542, issued in Tehran, born in 1298 (1919), previously minister of the deposed royal court, and the Shah's ex-Prime Minister, a citizen of Iran, is accused of:
1. Spreading corruption on earth.
2. Fighting God, God's creatures and the Viceroy of Imam Zaman.
3. Acts of sedition detrimental to national security and independence, through forming cabinets that were puppets of the United States and England and defending the interests of colonialists.
4. Plotting against national sovereignty by interference in elections to Majlis, appointing and dismissing ministers at the behest of foreign embassies.
5. Turning over underground resources: oil, copper and uranium, to foreigners.
6. Expansion of the influence of American imperialism, and its European allies, in Iran by destroying internal resources and turning Iran into a market for foreign commodities.
7. Paying national revenues from oil to the Shah and Farah and to countries dependent on the West and then borrowing money at high interest, and enslaving conditions from America and Western countries.
8. Ruining agriculture and destroying forests.
9. Direct participation in acts of espionage for the West and Zionism.
10. Complicity with conspirators from CENTO and NATO for the oppression of the peoples of Palestine, Vietnam and Iran.
11. Active member of Freemasonry in the Foroughi Lodge according to existing documents and the confessions of the accused.
12. Participation in terrorizing and frightening the justice seeking people including their death and injury and limiting their freedom by closing down newspapers and exercising censorship on the print media and books.
13. Founder and first secretary of the despotic "Rastakhiz of the Iranian People" party.
14. Spreading cultural and ethical corruption and direct participation in consolidating the pillars of colonialism and granting capitulatory rights to Americans.
15. Direct participation in smuggling heroin in France along with Hassan Ali Mansour.
16. False reporting through the publication of puppet papers and appointing puppet editors to head the media.
17. According to minutes of cabinet meetings and of the Supreme Economic Council, and the claims of private plaintiffs, including Ali Sayyed Javadi, and taking into account documents found in SAVAK and the office of the prime minister, and the confessions of Manouchehr Azmoun, Mahmoud Jafarian, Parviz Nikkhah, and the confessions of the accused, since the commission of the crimes is certain, the prosecutor of the Islamic Revolutionary Court asks the court to issue the judgment of the death penalty and the confiscation of all your [Hoveyda's] property.

The composition of the trial's proceedings reflected the style in which the indictment was designed and promulgated. Many of the charges were never substantiated and often reflected uninvestigated rumours of the day. Abbas Milani agrees with this notion when he described the essence of the court's ambience:

It became clear that rules of evidence, notions of innocence until proven guilty, and a dispassionate judge, dispensing impartial judgments based on incontrovertible evidence, were all alien to this court … Gossip had the authority of fact, as evident in article fifteen of the indictment, and unsubstantiated rumours were taken as proof of guilt.

On 7 April 1979, Hoveyda was transported to Qasr Prison, once a getaway palace for monarchs of the Qajar dynasty, but converted into a prison during the 1920s. By this time, he had become aware that there would be no mercy for him, and the whole charade would end in his own murder. Quickly shuffled back in front of Khalkhali's tribunal, he once again heard the court's indictment at three in the afternoon. There is some speculation as to who ordered the resumption of the trial. Bani Sadr, one among many leaders of the Provisional Revolutionary Government who advocated a public trial, states that only Khomeini himself had the authority to make such an order. Behind locked doors, Hoveyda's fate, which had already been decided by Khomeini days earlier, was sealed.

Khalkhali repeatedly yelled at and insulted Hoveyda during much of the trial, calling him "a corrupter of the earth" and a "Western criminal puppet", refusing to allow him to make a testimony in his defense. In defiance, Hoveyda denounced Khalkhali and informed him that he had no intention of defending himself any longer in front of a sham court. Immediately, Khalkhali announced his sentence, death by firing squad and confiscation of all material possessions.

Minutes later, the former prime minister was taken into the prison's yard. Before reaching the area designated for firing squad executions, Hujjat-al-Islam Hadi Ghaffari pulled out a pistol and shot Hoveyda twice in the neck. He was left on the ground in agony, begging for the executioners to "finish him off". Seconds before the coup de grâce was at last given, Hoveyda is said to have gasped to the guard standing over him: "It wasn't supposed to end like this". According to the autopsy report, he apparently also was beaten shortly before his execution.

Hoveyda's corpse was held in Tehran's morgue for several months after his execution, before it was secretly released to his immediate family and buried in Behesht-e Zahra cemetery in Tehran as an unknown deceased.

== Personal life ==
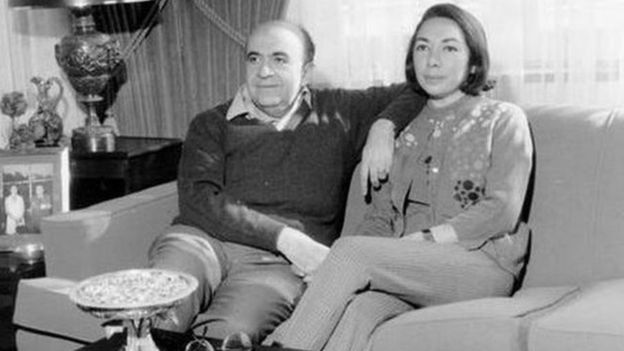
Hoveyda and his wife, Leila Emami

On 19 July 1966, Hoveyda married leila Emami (1932–2018) in a small ceremony. Only a small number of guests were invited to attend, including the Shah, Queen Farah, Emami's parents, Hoveyda's mother, and his friend Manouchehr Shahgholi and his wife. The marriage ended in 1971, but the two would remain friends, often traveling together. They had no children.

Hoveyda maintained a residence in A.S.P. Towers, which was looted by revolutionaries shortly after his death. According to some witnesses, he rarely had any items of luxury nature; his most prized possessions were a rocking chair and a library of a few hundred books.

== Legacy ==
In 2000, Hoveyda's biography, The Persian Sphinx, written by Abbas Milani, was first published in English, and followed by Persian editions in 2001 and 2002. Hoveyda was awarded the French title of Commander of the Legion of Honour after his death.

Hoveyda also provided financial assistance to the translator Roger Savory for the publication of the book "Tarikh-e Alam-ara-ye Abbasi written by Iskandar Beg Munshi.

== External References ==
- Abbas Milani, The Persian Sphinx: Amir Abbas Hoveyda and the Riddle of the Iranian Revolution, Mage Publishers, 2000, ISBN 0-934211-61-2, and I.B.Tauris, 2000, ISBN 978-1-85043-328-6 (Excerpt from Chapter One)
- Amir Abbas Hoveyda's Execution case
- Encyclopædia Iranica: Amir-Abbas Hoveyda at Brill Publishers
- Amir-Abbas Hoveyda IMDb
- Milani, Abbas (2008). "Amir-Abbas Hoveyda". Eminent Persians, Volume 1. Syracuse University Press. pp. 193–204. ISBN 978-0-81560-907-0.
- Biographies: Amir-Abbas Hoveyda in Encyclopædia Britannica
- One Person's Story: Amir-Abbas Hoveyda at Abdorrahman Boroumand Center for Human Rights in Iran

Political offices
Preceded by Kamal Hassani	Minister of Finance; 1964–1965	Succeeded by Jamshid Amouzegar
Preceded by Jafar Sharif-Emami	Deputy Prime Minister of Iran; 1964–1965	Succeeded by Ardeshir Zahedi
Preceded by Hassan Ali Mansour	Prime Minister of Iran; 1965–1977	Succeeded by Jamshid Amouzegar
Preceded by Asadollah Alam	Minister of Royal Court; 1977–1978	Succeeded by Position abolished
Party political offices
Preceded by Manouchehr Kalali	Secretary-General of the New Iran Party; 1974–1975	Succeeded by Party Dissolved
Preceded by None	Secretary-General of the Rastakhiz Party; 1975–1976	Succeeded by Jamshid Amouzegar
