= Hassan Ali Mansur =

Iranian politician (1923–1965)

- حسن علی منصور
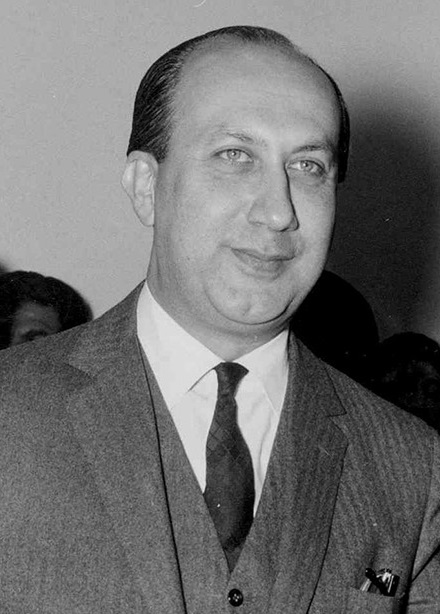

36th Prime Minister of Iran
- In office 7 March 1964 – 26 January 1965
- Monarch: Mohammad Reza Shah
- Preceded by: Asadollah Alam
- Succeeded by: Amir-Abbas Hoveida

Personal details
- Born: 13 April 1923 Tehran, Iran
- Died: 26 January 1965 (aged 41) Tehran, Iran
- Party: New Iran Party
- Spouse: Farideh Emami
- Children: 2
- Parent: Ali Mansur (father)
- Education: University of Tehran

Hassan Ali Mansur (Persian: حسن علی منصور; 13 April 1923 – 26 January 1965) was an Iranian politician who served as Prime Minister from 1964 to 1965. He served during the White Revolution of the Shah Mohammad Reza Pahlavi and was assassinated by a member of the Fada'iyan-e Islam.

== Early life and education ==
Hassan Ali was born in Tehran on 13 April 1923 to future Prime Minister Ali Mansur (Mansur ol-Molk) and daughter of Zahir ol-Molk Raiss. He received primary education in Tehran and graduated from Firooz Bahram High School. During the World War II era, he entered Law School at the University of Tehran and graduated with a degree in political science.

== Career ==
In the post World War II era, Mansour started his political career by entering the foreign ministry and completed several internal and foreign assignments including tours of Germany and France. In the 1950s, this thirty-year-old was twice appointed chief of prime minister's office, first for a brief period because of change in government, and second lasted for 2 years. In 1957, Prime Minister Manouchehr Eghbal appointed him as chairman of the economics council and vice prime minister. He also held the positions of minister of labor, and minister of trade. Prime minister Asadollah Alam appointed him as chairman of "Bimeh Iran" insurance company.

The Progressive Party or "Kanoon Motaraghion" was founded by Mansour to conduct economic policy research as well as the launching pad for his future prime ministership. In 1962 Mansour ran for the 21st Majlis and was elected as the second representative from Tehran, after Abdollah Riazi, speaker of the Majlis. A few dozen of his party members were also elected to Majlis, with the exception of Hoveyda and Kashefian who were more interested in executive branch. Mansour then expanded his power base by forming a coalition and founded "IRAN NOVIN" party with a majority of 175 out of 230 deputies, and was elected the Majority Leader of Parliament.

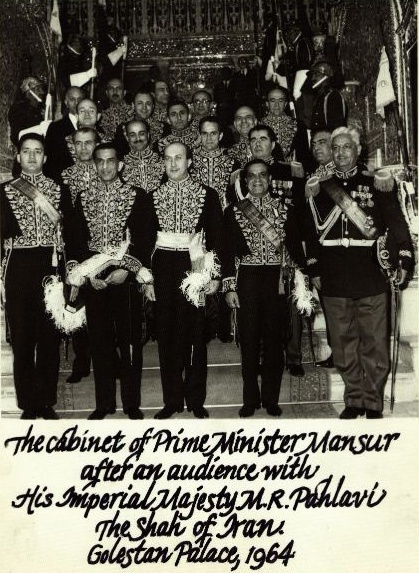
Cabinet of Mansur

After Alam resigned his premiership in 1964, Mohammad Reza Pahlavi appointed Mansur prime minister and his cabinet was announced on 7 March. He introduced many young new faces, such as Amir Abbas Hoveyda, Jamshid Amuzegar, Ataollah Khosravani, Nahavandi, Alinaghi Alikhani, Manouchehr Rohani, and many other Iran Novin members. Since most of his cabinet were young and American/European educated, Mansour had pro-American tendencies in his policies and enjoyed the American government's support. Clearly the Shah now felt more comfortable working with people from his own generation than the older generation who also served his father and called him "Shah Javan" or the "Young Shah". The torch was passed from the old war heroes to younger educated technocrats to carry out the "White Revolution" and an explosive decade of growth.

Mansur passed the Geneva Convention American Force Protection Act, also known as the highly controversial Capitulation Law. This led to a fiery attack by Ayatollah Khomeini from Qom, and resulted in his historical exile to Turkey, and many subsequent riots. Mansur also raised the price of gasoline from 5 to 10 Rials to meet budget deficits, but later retreated after strikes by taxi drivers.

== Personal life ==
Mansur was briefly engaged to Noushie Teymourtash, but subsequently married Farideh Emami. He was survived by a son, the jazz guitarist Ahmad Mansur (1960–2011) and a daughter, the journalist Fati Mansur (1964). Farideh's sister Leyla Emami, later married prime minister Amir-Abbas Hoveyda. Javad Mansur, his brother, also served as a consultant to prime minister Hoveyda. His sister Touran was briefly engaged to Fereydoon Hoveyda, Amir Abbas Hoveyda's younger brother, but she subsequently married Manouchehr Teymourtash.

== Assassination ==
At 10am on 21 January 1965, a few days before the first anniversary of the White Revolution, Mansur was entering the gates of Majlis to present his first speech. After he stepped out of his car in Baharestan Square, he was shot three times by 21-year-old Mohammad Bokharaei, a member of Fada'iyan-e Islam. Bokharaei was later executed, along with three others implicated in the assassination – Reza Saffar Harandi, Haaj Sadegh Amani, and Morteza Niknejad.

Mansur was put back into the car and rushed to the hospital, where he remained in critical condition for 5 days before he finally died. During the crisis, the Shah quickly appointed Mansur's friend, Amir-Abbas Hoveyda as the acting prime minister, in which role he continued for the next thirteen years. Mansour's assassination occurred a few years after the assassination of prime minister Ali Razmara.

Mansur was buried in Shah-Abdol-Azim near Reza Shah's mausoleum, and a Kennedy-like Black Granite Eternal Flame was constructed at his grave site. After the Islamic Revolution, the Mansur gravesite was destroyed by Ayatollah Khalkhali, and his remains were dug up and scattered.

Political offices
Preceded by Asadollah Alam	Prime Minister of Iran; 1964–1965	Succeeded by Amir Abbas Hoveyda
Party political offices
New title Party established	Secretary-General of the New Iran Party; 1963–1965	Succeeded by Ataollah Khosravani
