= Showkat Malek Jahanbani =

Iranian educator and politician

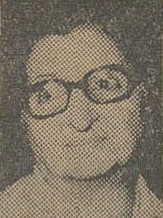
- Jahanbani in 1975

Member of the National Consultative Assembly
- In office 1963–1975
- Constituency: Tehran

Member of the Senate
- In office 1975–1979

Personal details
- Born: 1908
- Died: 26 October 1995 (aged 86–87) Tehran, Iran

Showkat Malek Jahanbani (Persian: شوکت ملک جهانبانی; 1908 – 26 October 1995) was an Iranian educator and politician. In 1963 she was one of the first group of women elected to the National Consultative Assembly.

== Biography ==
Jahanbani was born in 1908, the daughter of a Qajar prince. She married a cousin from the Jahanbani family. She attended Tehran Teachers Training College and subsequently became a 'pioneer in girl's education'. She established the Iran School in Tehran as well as managing all age sections of the National Iran School. She founded the Iran Cultural Institute, served as vice president of the Iranian Women's Sports Council, secretary general of the Farah Pahlavi Charity, was a trustee of Aryamehr Technical University and was a board member of the Tehran Red Lion and Sun Society and Women's Cultural Society.

Jahanbani was also involved in politics, becoming a member of the Iran Novin Party's Executive Committee with responsibility for its women's council. Women were granted the right to vote in 1963 and in the parliamentary elections that year she was one of six women elected to the National Consultative Assembly. She was re-elected in 1967 and 1971. During her time in parliament she was president of the Education Commission and vice president of the Culture Commission. In 1975 she was elected to the Senate.

She died in Tehran in October 1995.
