= Hajar Tarbiat =

Iranian women's rights activist and politician (1906–1974)

Member of the National Consultative Assembly
- In office 1963–1971
- Constituency: Tehran

Member of the Senate
- In office 1971–1974

Personal details
- Born: 1906 Constantinople, Ottoman Empire
- Died: 1974 Tehran, Pahlavi Iran

Hajar Tarbiat (Persian: هاجر تربیت; 1906 – 1974) was an Iranian women's rights activist and politician. In 1963 she was one of the first group of women elected to the National Consultative Assembly. Eight years later, she also became the first woman elected to the Senate.

== Biography ==
Tarbiat was born in 1906 in Constantinople, where her father Hossein Gholi Tarbiat worked in the Persian embassy. After completing her secondary education, she also began working at the embassy. While living in Constantinople, she met Mohammad Ali Tarbiat, whom she married. The couple moved to Persia, where Tarbiat became head of a school in Tabriz.

In 1935 she established the Women's Centre in Tehran, supporting the Kashf-e hijab reform against compulsory hijab (veiling).

In 1943 she was amongst the co-founders of the Women's Party. After Mohammad Reza Pahlavi ordered foreign schools to be run by Iranians, she became head of the American Noorbakhsh High School. She later worked as a schools inspector, headed the Tehran Teacher Training College and served as director-general of the Department of Social Affairs of the Ministry of Interior.

Women were granted the right to vote in 1963, and in the parliamentary elections that year, Tarbiat was one of six women elected to the National Consultative Assembly. She was re-elected in 1967. In the 1971 elections she was elected to the Senate, the first female Senator to be elected (the previous female Senators had been appointed). She died in Tehran in 1974.
