= Results of the 1968 Iranian local elections =

This article contains the results of the 1968 Iranian local elections.

== Results ==
Source: Ministry of Interior

City	Seats		
City	New Iran Party	People's Party	Nonpartisan
Abadan	15 / 15	0 / 15	0 / 15
Abadeh	7 / 7	0 / 7	0 / 7
Azarshahr	7 / 7	0 / 7	0 / 7
Aran	7 / 7	0 / 7	0 / 7
Aghajari	7 / 7	0 / 7	0 / 7
Astaneh	7 / 7	0 / 7	0 / 7
Amol	7 / 7	0 / 7	0 / 7
Abhar	7 / 7	0 / 7	0 / 7
Arak	9 / 9	0 / 9	0 / 9
Ardabil	9 / 9	0 / 9	0 / 9
Ardestan	5 / 5	0 / 5	0 / 5
Ardakan	7 / 7	0 / 7	0 / 7
Osku	6 / 7	0 / 7	1 / 7
Astara	0 / 7	7 / 7	0 / 7
Esfarayen	5 / 5	0 / 5	0 / 5
Estahbanat	7 / 7	0 / 7	0 / 7
Esfahan	15 / 15	0 / 15	0 / 15
Eqlid	7 / 7	0 / 7	0 / 7
Amirkola	7 / 7	0 / 7	0 / 7
Andimeshk	0 / 7	7 / 7	0 / 7
Ahar	0 / 7	7 / 7	0 / 7
Ahvaz	12 / 12	0 / 12	0 / 12
Izeh	2 / 5	3 / 5	0 / 5
Iranshahr	5 / 5	0 / 5	0 / 5
Ilam	7 / 7	0 / 7	0 / 7
Aligoudarz	7 / 7	0 / 7	0 / 7
Babol	9 / 9	0 / 9	0 / 9
Babolsar	7 / 7	0 / 7	0 / 7
Baft	5 / 5	0 / 5	0 / 5
Bafq	5 / 5	0 / 5	0 / 5
Baneh	5 / 5	0 / 5	0 / 5
Borazjan	7 / 7	0 / 7	0 / 7
Boroujerd	0 / 9	9 / 9	0 / 9
Boroujen	7 / 7	0 / 7	0 / 7
Bojnourd	7 / 7	0 / 7	0 / 7
Bam	0 / 7	7 / 7	0 / 7
Behshahr	7 / 7	0 / 7	0 / 7
Behbahan	7 / 7	0 / 7	0 / 7
Bonab	0 / 7	7 / 7	0 / 7
Bandar Shah	7 / 7	0 / 7	0 / 7
Bandar Pahlavi	7 / 7	0 / 7	0 / 7
Bandar Mahshahr	7 / 7	0 / 7	0 / 7
Bandar Abbas	7 / 7	0 / 7	0 / 7
Bandar Lengeh	2 / 5	2 / 5	1 / 5
Bushehr	4 / 7	3 / 7	0 / 7
Bahar	7 / 7	0 / 7	0 / 7
Birjand	7 / 7	0 / 7	0 / 7
Bijar	7 / 7	0 / 7	0 / 7
Paveh	5 / 5	0 / 5	0 / 5
Piranshahr	5 / 5	0 / 5	0 / 5
Tehran	30 / 30	0 / 30	0 / 30
Takestan	7 / 7	0 / 7	0 / 7
Tafresh	5 / 5	0 / 5	0 / 5
Taft	0 / 5	5 / 5	0 / 5
Tabriz	15 / 15	0 / 15	0 / 15
Torbat Jam	6 / 7	0 / 7	1 / 7
Torbat Heydarieh	0 / 7	7 / 7	0 / 7
Tuyserkan	7 / 7	0 / 7	0 / 7
Jahrom	7 / 7	0 / 7	0 / 7
Jouybar	7 / 7	0 / 7	0 / 7
Jiroft	5 / 5	0 / 5	0 / 5
Chabahar	0 / 5	4 / 5	1 / 5
Chalous	6 / 7	0 / 7	1 / 7
Khomein	7 / 7	0 / 7	0 / 7
Khalkhal	7 / 7	0 / 7	0 / 7
Khansar	6 / 7	0 / 7	1 / 7
Khorasgan	7 / 7	0 / 7	0 / 7
Khoy	7 / 7	0 / 7	0 / 7
Khorramshahr	9 / 9	0 / 9	0 / 9
Khorramabad	9 / 9	0 / 9	0 / 9
Dehloran	0 / 5	5 / 5	0 / 5
Damavand	5 / 5	0 / 5	0 / 5
Dorud	7 / 7	0 / 7	0 / 7
Dezfoul	9 / 9	0 / 9	0 / 9
Dashtemishan	5 / 5	0 / 5	0 / 5
Darab	7 / 7	0 / 7	0 / 7
Damghan	7 / 7	0 / 7	0 / 7
Darreshahr	5 / 5	0 / 5	0 / 5
Dargaz	0 / 7	7 / 7	0 / 7
Gachsaran	7 / 7	0 / 7	0 / 7
Dehdasht	5 / 5	0 / 5	0 / 5
Ramsar	7 / 7	0 / 7	0 / 7
Rudbar	5 / 5	0 / 5	0 / 5
Rasht	12 / 12	0 / 12	0 / 12
Rudsar	6 / 6	0 / 6	0 / 6
Rezaiyeh	12 / 12	0 / 12	0 / 12
Ramhormoz	5 / 5	0 / 5	0 / 5
Rafsanjan	7 / 7	0 / 7	0 / 7
Renan	7 / 7	0 / 7	0 / 7

City	Seats		
City	New Iran Party	People's Party	Nonpartisan
Falavarjan	6 / 6	0 / 6	0 / 6
Zajan	8 / 9	0 / 9	1 / 9
Zahedan	7 / 7	0 / 7	0 / 7
Zabol	1 / 7	6 / 7	0 / 7
Saveh	7 / 7	0 / 7	0 / 7
Sari	7 / 7	0 / 7	0 / 7
Sarab	7 / 7	0 / 7	0 / 7
Sardasht	1 / 5	0 / 5	4 / 5
Sonqor	7 / 7	0 / 7	0 / 7
Sabzevar	7 / 7	0 / 7	0 / 7
Sirjan	7 / 7	0 / 7	0 / 7
Semirom	7 / 7	0 / 7	0 / 7
Saravan	5 / 5	0 / 5	0 / 5
Sanandaj	9 / 9	0 / 9	0 / 9
Saqqez	7 / 7	0 / 7	0 / 7
Semnan	7 / 7	0 / 7	0 / 7
Shahrekord	7 / 7	0 / 7	0 / 7
Shahroud	7 / 7	0 / 7	0 / 7
Shahreza	7 / 7	0 / 7	0 / 7
Shirvan	7 / 7	0 / 7	0 / 7
Shiraz	15 / 15	0 / 15	0 / 15
Shushtar	7 / 7	0 / 7	0 / 7
Shahabad	7 / 7	0 / 7	0 / 7
Shahpour	4 / 7	3 / 7	0 / 7
Shahsavar	7 / 7	0 / 7	0 / 7
Shahi	5 / 7	2 / 7	0 / 7
Sumesara	4 / 5	0 / 5	1 / 5
Tavlesh	0 / 5	5 / 5	0 / 5
Tabas	0 / 7	7 / 7	0 / 7
Aliabad	7 / 7	0 / 7	0 / 7
Fuman	1 / 7	6 / 7	0 / 7
Fasa	7 / 7	0 / 7	0 / 7
Firouzabad	5 / 5	0 / 5	0 / 5
Ferdows	7 / 7	0 / 7	0 / 7
Faridan	5 / 5	0 / 5	0 / 5
Qazvin	9 / 9	0 / 9	0 / 9
Qom	12 / 12	0 / 12	0 / 12
Qasreshirin	7 / 7	0 / 7	0 / 7
Qeydar	5 / 5	0 / 5	0 / 5
Qorveh	5 / 5	0 / 5	0 / 5
Quchan	7 / 7	0 / 7	0 / 7
Kashan	9 / 9	0 / 9	0 / 9
Karaj	9 / 9	0 / 9	0 / 9
Kermanshah	12 / 12	0 / 12	0 / 12
Kazerun	0 / 7	6 / 7	1 / 7
Kashmar	7 / 7	0 / 7	0 / 7
Kerman	9 / 9	0 / 9	0 / 9
Kordkuy	7 / 7	0 / 7	0 / 7
Golpayegan	7 / 7	0 / 7	0 / 7
Gonabad	7 / 7	0 / 7	0 / 7
Gorgan	9 / 9	0 / 9	0 / 9
Garmsar	0 / 5	5 / 5	0 / 5
Gonbad	7 / 7	0 / 7	0 / 7
Lar	7 / 7	0 / 7	0 / 7
Lahijan	7 / 7	0 / 7	0 / 7
Langerud	0 / 7	7 / 7	0 / 7
Mahallat	7 / 7	0 / 7	0 / 7
Marand	7 / 7	0 / 7	0 / 7
Maragheh	9 / 9	0 / 9	0 / 9
Marvdasht	7 / 7	0 / 7	0 / 7
Mianeh	7 / 7	0 / 7	0 / 7
Meshkinshahr	5 / 5	0 / 5	0 / 5
Mahabad	7 / 7	0 / 7	0 / 7
Mehriz	7 / 7	0 / 7	0 / 7
Maku	5 / 5	0 / 5	0 / 5
Miandoab	4 / 7	3 / 7	0 / 7
Minab	5 / 5	0 / 5	0 / 5
Meybod	7 / 7	0 / 7	0 / 7
Masjed Soleyman	9 / 9	0 / 9	0 / 9
Nurabad	5 / 5	0 / 5	0 / 5
Marivan	5 / 5	0 / 5	0 / 5
Malayer	7 / 7	0 / 7	0 / 7
Mashhad	15 / 15	0 / 15	0 / 15
Nain	5 / 5	0 / 5	0 / 5
Natanz	1 / 5	4 / 5	0 / 5
Najafabad	7 / 7	0 / 7	0 / 7
Naqadeh	4 / 5	0 / 5	1 / 5
Noshahr	5 / 5	0 / 5	0 / 5
Nur	0 / 5	5 / 5	0 / 5
Nahavand	4 / 7	3 / 7	0 / 7
Neyriz	0 / 7	7 / 7	0 / 7
Neishabour	4 / 7	3 / 7	0 / 7
Varamin	7 / 7	0 / 7	0 / 7
Harsin	7 / 7	0 / 7	0 / 7
Homayunshahr	7 / 7	0 / 7	0 / 7
Hashtrud	1 / 5	4 / 5	0 / 5
Hamedan	12 / 12	0 / 12	0 / 12
Yasuj	5 / 5	0 / 5	0 / 5
Yazd	9 / 9	0 / 9	0 / 9
