= Results of the 1972 Iranian local elections =

This article contains the results of the 1972 Iranian local elections.

== County councils ==
Province	Seats		
Province	New Iran Party	People's Party	Nonpartisan
Central	231 / 249	18 / 249	0 / 249
Khorasan	213 / 261	44 / 261	4 / 261
Esfahan	121 / 138	16 / 138	1 / 138
East Azerbaijan	231 / 282	48 / 282	3 / 282
Khuzestan	146 / 167	19 / 167	2 / 167
Mazandaran	169 / 207	33 / 207	5 / 207
Fars	126 / 160	21 / 160	13 / 160
Gilan	105 / 154	49 / 154	0 / 154
West Azerbaijan	99 / 132	23 / 132	10 / 132
Kerman	68 / 84	16 / 84	0 / 84
Kermanshah	67 / 83	16 / 83	0 / 83
Coastal	39 / 73	29 / 73	5 / 73
Sistan & Baluchestan	35 / 58	19 / 58	4 / 58
Kordestan	86 / 86	0 / 86	0 / 86
Hamedan	78 / 91	13 / 91	0 / 91
Lorestan	57 / 73	16 / 73	0 / 73
Zanjan	52 / 56	4 / 56	0 / 56
Yazd	33 / 40	7 / 40	0 / 40
Chaharmahal & Bakhtiari	26 / 34	7 / 34	1 / 34
Semnan	27 / 27	0 / 27	0 / 27
Ilam	22 / 31	7 / 31	2 / 31
Boyer-Ahmad & Kohgiluyeh	19 / 23	4 / 23	0 / 23
Total	2,050 / 2,509	409 / 2,509	50 / 2,509
Source: Ministry of Interior

== Educational councils ==
Source: Ministry of Interior

City	Seats		
City	New Iran Party	People's Party	Nonpartisan
Abadan	5 / 5	0 / 5	0 / 5
Abadeh	4 / 4	0 / 4	0 / 4
Amol	4 / 4	0 / 4	0 / 4
Abhar	3 / 3	0 / 3	0 / 3
Arak	5 / 5	0 / 5	0 / 5
Ardabil	3 / 5	2 / 5	0 / 5
Ardestan	2 / 2	0 / 2	0 / 2
Ardakan	2 / 2	0 / 2	0 / 2
Ahar	3 / 3	0 / 3	0 / 3
Astara	0 / 2	2 / 2	0 / 2
Aghajari	2 / 2	0 / 2	0 / 2
Esfarayen	2 / 2	0 / 2	0 / 2
Estahbanat	2 / 2	0 / 2	0 / 2
Esfahan	5 / 5	0 / 5	0 / 5
Aligoudarz	3 / 3	0 / 3	0 / 3
Ahvaz	5 / 5	0 / 5	0 / 5
Izeh	1 / 2	1 / 2	0 / 2
Iranshahr	2 / 2	0 / 2	0 / 2
Ilam	2 / 2	0 / 2	0 / 2
Azarshahr	2 / 2	0 / 2	0 / 2
Osku	1 / 2	0 / 2	1 / 2
Eqlid	2 / 2	0 / 2	0 / 2
Babol	4 / 4	0 / 4	0 / 4
Babolsar	3 / 3	0 / 3	0 / 3
Baft	2 / 2	0 / 2	0 / 2
Bafq	2 / 2	0 / 2	0 / 2
Baneh	3 / 3	0 / 3	0 / 3
Borazjan	0 / 3	3 / 3	0 / 3
Boroujerd	0 / 4	4 / 4	0 / 4
Boroujen	3 / 3	0 / 3	0 / 3
Bojnourd	3 / 3	0 / 3	0 / 3
Bam	3 / 3	0 / 3	0 / 3
Behshahr	4 / 4	0 / 4	0 / 4
Behbahan	4 / 4	0 / 4	0 / 4
Bandar Pahlavi	3 / 3	0 / 3	0 / 3
Bandar Abbas	4 / 4	0 / 4	0 / 4
Bandar Lengeh	2 / 2	0 / 2	0 / 2
Bushehr	1 / 4	3 / 4	0 / 4
Birjand	4 / 4	0 / 4	0 / 4
Bijar	2 / 2	0 / 2	0 / 2
Paveh	0 / 2	2 / 2	0 / 2
Piranshahr	2 / 2	0 / 2	0 / 2
Tehran	9 / 9	0 / 9	0 / 9
Tafresh	3 / 3	0 / 3	0 / 3
Taft	2 / 2	0 / 2	0 / 2
Tuyserkan	3 / 3	0 / 3	0 / 3
Tabriz	5 / 5	0 / 5	0 / 5
Torbat Jam	3 / 3	0 / 3	0 / 3
Torbat Heydarieh	2 / 4	2 / 4	0 / 4
Jahrom	3 / 3	0 / 3	0 / 3
Chabahar	2 / 2	0 / 2	0 / 2
Chalous	1 / 3	0 / 3	2 / 3
Khomein	3 / 3	0 / 3	0 / 3
Jiroft	3 / 3	0 / 3	0 / 3
Khalkhal	3 / 3	0 / 3	0 / 3
Khansar	2 / 2	0 / 2	0 / 2
Khoy	4 / 4	0 / 4	0 / 4
Khorramshahr	4 / 4	0 / 4	0 / 4
Khorramabad	4 / 4	0 / 4	0 / 4
Dehloran	0 / 2	2 / 2	0 / 2
Damavand	3 / 3	0 / 3	0 / 3
Dezfoul	4 / 4	0 / 4	0 / 4
Dashtemishan	2 / 2	0 / 2	0 / 2
Darab	2 / 2	0 / 2	0 / 2
Damghan	3 / 3	0 / 3	0 / 3
Darreshahr	2 / 2	0 / 2	0 / 2
Dargaz	0 / 2	1 / 2	1 / 2
Gachsaran	3 / 3	0 / 3	0 / 3
Ramsar	2 / 2	0 / 2	0 / 2
Rasht	5 / 5	0 / 5	0 / 5
Rudsar	4 / 4	0 / 4	0 / 4
Rudbar	3 / 3	0 / 3	0 / 3
Rezaiyeh	5 / 5	0 / 5	0 / 5
Ramhormoz	2 / 2	0 / 2	0 / 2
Rafsanjan	4 / 4	0 / 4	0 / 4
Rey	4 / 4	0 / 4	0 / 4
Zajan	4 / 4	0 / 4	0 / 4
Zahedan	3 / 3	0 / 3	0 / 3
Zabol	4 / 4	0 / 4	0 / 4
Saveh	4 / 4	0 / 4	0 / 4

City	Seats		
City	New Iran Party	People's Party	Nonpartisan
Sari	4 / 4	0 / 4	0 / 4
Sarab	3 / 3	0 / 3	0 / 3
Sardasht	0 / 2	0 / 2	2 / 2
Sonqor	2 / 2	0 / 2	0 / 2
Sabzevar	4 / 4	0 / 4	0 / 4
Sirjan	3 / 3	0 / 3	0 / 3
Semirom	2 / 2	0 / 2	0 / 2
Saravan	2 / 2	0 / 2	0 / 2
Sanandaj	4 / 4	0 / 4	0 / 4
Saqqez	2 / 2	0 / 2	0 / 2
Semnan	3 / 3	0 / 3	0 / 3
Shahrekord	4 / 4	0 / 4	0 / 4
Shahroud	3 / 3	0 / 3	0 / 3
Shahreza	3 / 3	0 / 3	0 / 3
Shirvan	2 / 2	0 / 2	0 / 2
Shiraz	5 / 5	0 / 5	0 / 5
Shushtar	3 / 3	0 / 3	0 / 3
Shahabad	3 / 3	0 / 3	0 / 3
Shahpour	0 / 3	3 / 3	0 / 3
Shahsavar	4 / 4	0 / 4	0 / 4
Shahi	4 / 4	0 / 4	0 / 4
Sumesara	4 / 4	0 / 4	0 / 4
Tavlesh	0 / 3	3 / 3	0 / 3
Tabas	0 / 2	2 / 2	0 / 2
Fuman	3 / 3	0 / 3	0 / 3
Fasa	3 / 3	0 / 3	0 / 3
Firouzabad	2 / 2	0 / 2	0 / 2
Ferdows	2 / 2	0 / 2	0 / 2
Faridan	3 / 3	0 / 3	0 / 3
Qazvin	5 / 5	0 / 5	0 / 5
Qom	4 / 4	0 / 4	0 / 4
Qasreshirin	3 / 3	0 / 3	0 / 3
Qeydar	1 / 2	0 / 2	1 / 2
Qorveh	2 / 2	0 / 2	0 / 2
Quchan	3 / 3	0 / 3	0 / 3
Kashan	4 / 4	0 / 4	0 / 4
Karaj	5 / 5	0 / 5	0 / 5
Kermanshah	5 / 5	0 / 5	0 / 5
Kazerun	0 / 4	4 / 4	0 / 4
Kashmar	2 / 2	0 / 2	0 / 2
Kerman	1 / 4	1 / 4	2 / 4
Golpayegan	3 / 3	0 / 3	0 / 3
Gonabad	2 / 2	0 / 2	0 / 2
Gorgan	5 / 5	0 / 5	0 / 5
Garmsar	3 / 3	0 / 3	0 / 3
Gonbad	4 / 4	0 / 4	0 / 4
Lar	2 / 2	0 / 2	0 / 2
Lahijan	4 / 4	0 / 4	0 / 4
Langerud	3 / 3	0 / 3	0 / 3
Mahallat	2 / 2	0 / 2	0 / 2
Mahshahr	2 / 2	0 / 2	0 / 2
Marand	3 / 3	0 / 3	0 / 3
Maragheh	4 / 4	0 / 4	0 / 4
Mianeh	3 / 3	0 / 3	0 / 3
Meshkinshahr	3 / 3	0 / 3	0 / 3
Mahabad	3 / 3	0 / 3	0 / 3
Maku	3 / 3	0 / 3	0 / 3
Miandoab	2 / 3	1 / 3	0 / 3
Minab	3 / 5	2 / 5	0 / 5
Masjed Soleyman	4 / 4	0 / 4	0 / 4
Nurabad	2 / 2	0 / 2	0 / 2
Marivan	2 / 2	0 / 2	0 / 2
Malayer	4 / 4	0 / 4	0 / 4
Mashhad	5 / 5	0 / 5	0 / 5
Nain	2 / 2	0 / 2	0 / 2
Natanz	0 / 2	2 / 2	0 / 2
Najafabad	4 / 4	0 / 4	0 / 4
Naqadeh	2 / 2	0 / 2	0 / 2
Noshahr	3 / 4	0 / 4	1 / 4
Nur	2 / 2	0 / 2	0 / 2
Nahavand	3 / 3	0 / 3	0 / 3
Neyriz	2 / 2	0 / 2	0 / 2
Neishabour	2 / 4	0 / 4	2 / 4
Varamin	4 / 4	0 / 4	0 / 4
Harsin	2 / 2	0 / 2	0 / 2
Homayunshahr	2 / 2	0 / 2	0 / 2
Hashtrud	0 / 2	2 / 2	0 / 2
Hamedan	2 / 5	3 / 5	0 / 5
Yasuj	2 / 2	0 / 2	0 / 2
Yazd	4 / 4	0 / 4	0 / 4
