= Nayereh Ebtehaj-Samii =

Iranian politician (1914–2017)

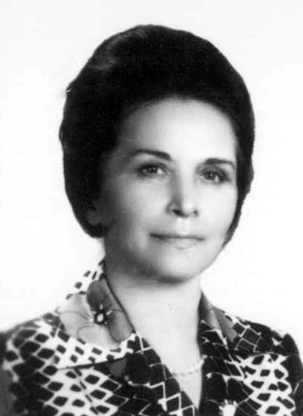

Member of the National Consultative Assembly
- In office 1963–1979
- Constituency: Rasht

Personal details
- Born: 1914 Rasht, Persia
- Died: 2017 (aged 103) Rasht, Iran

Nayereh Ebtehaj-Samii (Persian: نیره ابتهاج سمیعی; 1914–2017) was an Iranian educator and politician. In 1963 she was one of the first group of women elected to the National Consultative Assembly.

== Biography ==
Ebtehaj-Samii was born in Rasht in 1914. After being educated at a local Presbyterian Missionary school, she attended the American Missionary School in Tehran. She studied for a bachelor's degree in the Persian language and later became the first woman to earn a bachelor's degree in English at the University of Tehran. A member of the Women's Council, she became the first president of the Tehran chapter of Zonta International.

Women were granted the right to vote in 1963, and in the parliamentary elections that year, Ebtehaj-Samii was one of six women elected to the National Consultative Assembly. A founding member of the Iran Novin Party, she was re-elected in 1967 and 1971. After joining the Rastakhiz Party, she was re-elected again in 1975, and was the first woman to serve as Deputy Speaker.

Following the 1979 Iranian Revolution, she withdrew from politics and moved to the United States. However, she later returned to Iran, settling in Bandar-e Anzali, before moving back to Rasht. She died in April 2017 aged 103.
