= 1974 Shahsavar by-election =

- September 1974

One vacant seat for Shahsavar
- Turnout: +60%
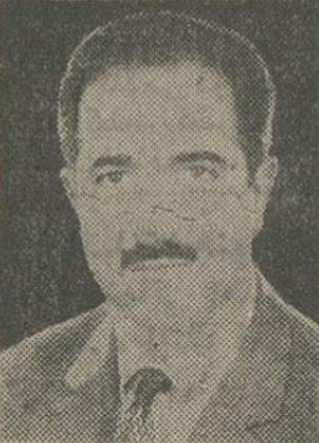

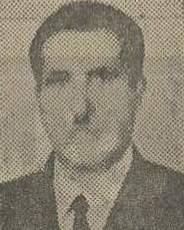
Candidate	Mansour Khalatbari	Mohammad-Reza Kabiri
Party	New Iran Party	People's Party
Popular vote	8,382	7,736
Percentage	52%	48%

A by-election was held in September 1974 to fill the vacant seat for Shahsavar in the National Consultative Assembly, the lower house of the Imperial State of Iran.

== Campaign ==
At the time, the ruling New Iran Party led by Prime Minister Amir-Abbas Hoveyda held the absolute majority in the parliament and its opposition, the People's Party, was regarded a "pseudo-opposition" party loyal to the state. The representative of Shahsavar in Mazandaran province who had been appointed to a cabinet office, resigned his seat due to legal requirements. In October 1974, the newly appointed Minister of Interior Jamshid Amouzegar chose his deputy ministers, neither of whom having any experience in holding elections. The next general elections were scheduled in less than a year and though it was not legally mandatory for the government to hold an election for that vacancy, Amouzegar decided to use the occasion to gain experience. Iran's monarch Mohammad Reza Pahlavi agreed that the election could to be held, stating "They will tell you I prefer this man or that woman, this party or that party. This is false. What I want is a clean election".

Nasser Ameri, the new secretary-general of the People's Party, had become overly critical of the governing party to the extent it was perceived to have "endangered the legitimacy of the system". He initially instructed the local of branch of his party in Shahsavar to boycott the by-election for the vacated seat but then was able to persuade the government to allow his party campaign freely. People's Party launched a serious campaign for its candidate, which focused on criticizing the government's ability to "implement efficiently the shah's intentions (manviat-e shahaneh)". The party's candidate Mohammad-Reza Kabiri also acted like a real opposition candidate (in contrast to his role as a "pseudo-opposition") during the campaign and even condemned the administration of Hoveyda. This led the city to undergo an "election fever", and both parties sent several of their leaders to the city to boost the campaign. This was a sign that the New Iran Party's candidate might lose the election, though the former representative of the constituency from the ruling party had won the previous election by a wide margin.

== Results ==
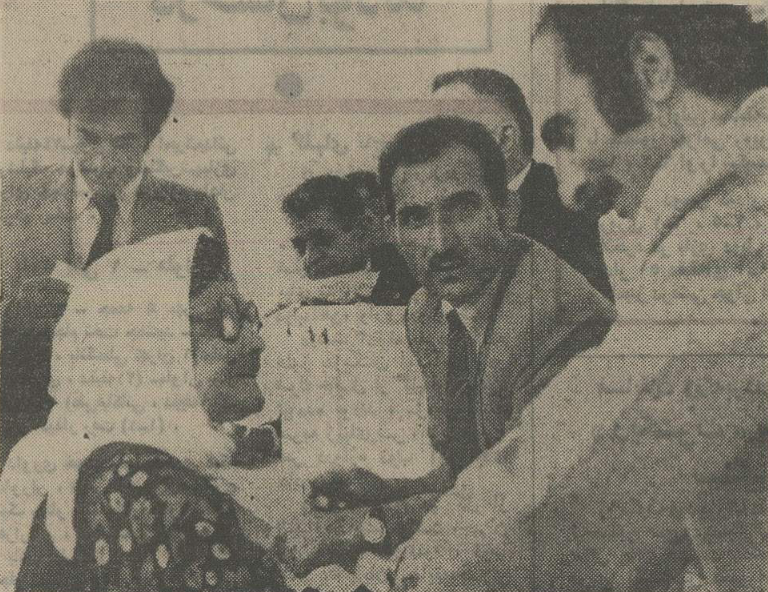
A rural woman casting her vote for the by-election

Candidate	Party	Votes	%
Mansour Khalatbari	New Iran Party	8,382	52.00
Mohammad-Reza Kabiri	People's Party	7,736	48.00
Total		16,118	100.00
Source: Official Results via Ettela'at newspaper

== Controversy ==
Mansour Khalatbari, the candidate of the ruling New Iran Party, said on 28 September "my defeat is utterly impossible" as the ballots were being counted. The opposition candidate Mohammad-Reza Kabiri won a large majority, but the government did not acknowledge this and officially declared that the former had won the election by a narrow margin of 646 votes. People's Party immediately denounced the results and its secretary-general publicly stated that an electoral fraud had happened. The government denied this, and initiated a complaint against a female member of the opposition party for "undermining credibility in the fairness of the elections".

In response to the controversy, Mohammad Reza Pahlavi remarked that the election was fair, but also said the ruling party "must probe this event to see what has caused it. The same applies to the opposition party", adding that "on the basis of sound democracy... one vote more or less is enough to have one elected or defeated. But it is not right to repudiate elections if one loses by even a single vote. Iranians must bear in mind that they must refrain from slander when engaged in free elections".

The opposition party stated that the ballot box in a village with 80 residents, included 1,044 ballots. About two weeks later, the government declared that 444 lived there and other voters had gone to the village to vote.

== Aftermath ==
Asadollah Alam, the founder of People's Party said Ameri has "reached the end of his rope" and he should either choose to let go or become a dissident. On 29 December 1974, the party's central committee discharged Ameri from his office and replaced him with Mohammad Fazaeli. A few days later in January 1975, Ameri died in a car accident.
