= Tehran City Council (1968–1979) =

Tehran City Council during the Pahlavi era

Type
- Type: Unicameral
- Term limits: 4 years

History
- Founded: 1968
- Disbanded: 11 February 1979
- Succeeded by: Islamic City Council of Tehran

Structure
- Seats: 30
- Committees: Financial Affairs; Budget and Organization of the Municipality; Town Planning and Reconstruction; Urban Taxes; Public Hygiene; Daily Needs; Guild Affairs; Urban Services; General and Physical Education; Legal Affairs; Liaison with Neighborhood Councils

Elections
- First election: 1968
- Last election: 1976

Tehran City Council (Persian: انجمن شهر تهران, romanized: anjoman-e šahr-e teḥrān) was the directly elected city council of Tehran and the first such institution to convene in Iran, serving as a model for other city councils in the country. It formalized the selection of the Mayor of Tehran, designated by the Ministry of Interior. The council had 30 members and 12 committees each with 5 members, with each member able to chair up to two. The members met once per week in an open session attended by the mayor and journalists.

The council suffered from the weakness of democratic accountability, lack of administrational and financial autonomy and limited scope of authority.

The last elections to the council took place in 1976 and it was abolished in 1979 when the Iranian Revolution took place.
