= Local councils of Iran =

The Islamic Councils (Persian: شوراهای اسلامی), formerly known as the Provincial Societies (Persian: انجمن‌های ایالتی و ولایتی, romanized: anjoman-ha-ye ayalati va velayati) are local councils which are elected by public vote in all cities and villages throughout Iran. Council members in each city or village are elected by direct public vote to a 4-year term.

According to article 7 of the Iranian Constitution, these local councils together with the Majlis (Parliament) are "decision-making and administrative organs of the State".

The councils are in charge of electing mayors, supervising the activities of municipalities; study of social, cultural, educational, health, economic, and welfare requirements of their constituencies; the planning and coordination of national participation in the implementation of social, economic, constructive, cultural, educational and other welfare affairs.

== Elections ==
- 1968
- 1970
- 1972
- 1974
- 1976
- 1978
- 1979
- 1999
- 2003
- 2006
- 2013
- 2017
- 2021

== City councils ==
City	Seats
Tehran	21
Mashhad	15
Isfahan	13
Shiraz	13
Tabriz	13
