= Ebtehaj =

Ebtehaj is a surname which is used in Iran. Notable people with the surname are as follows:

- Abul Hassan Ebtehaj (1899–1999), Iranian banker and administrator
- Hushang Ebtehaj (1928–2022), Iranian poet
- Nayereh Ebtehaj-Samii (1914–2017), Iranian educator and politician
