= 1970 Iranian local elections =

- September 1970

960 council seats in 150 local Councils
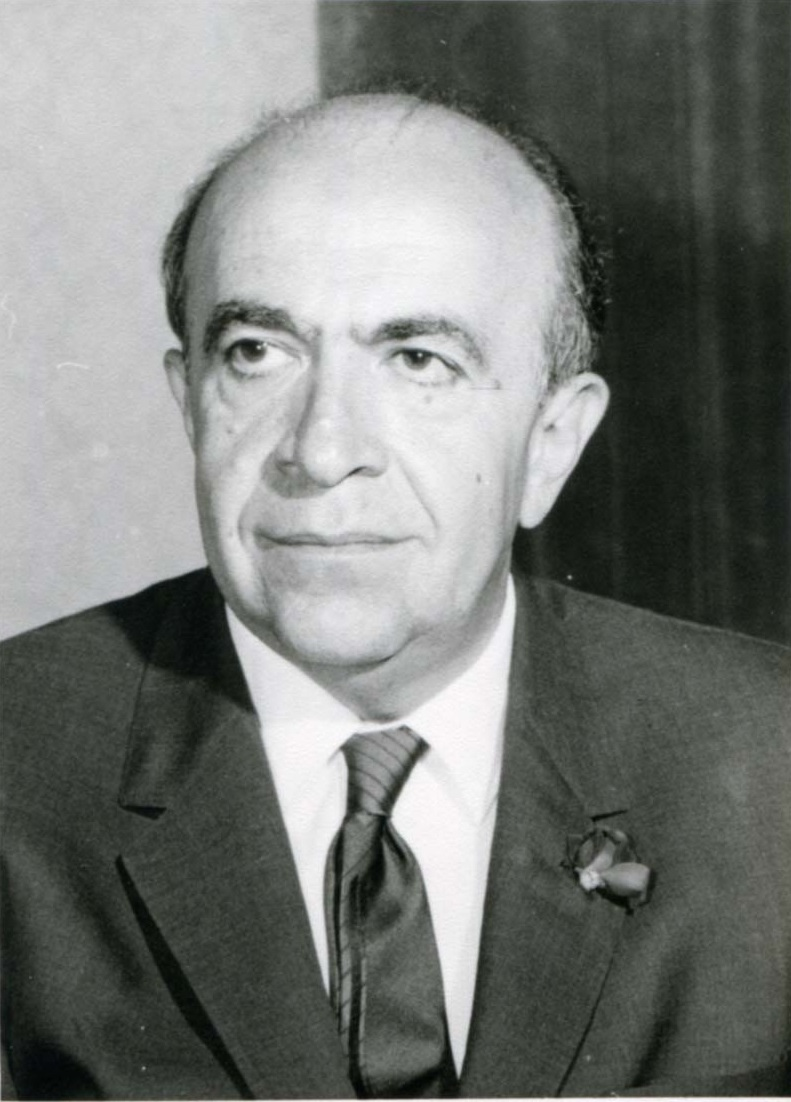

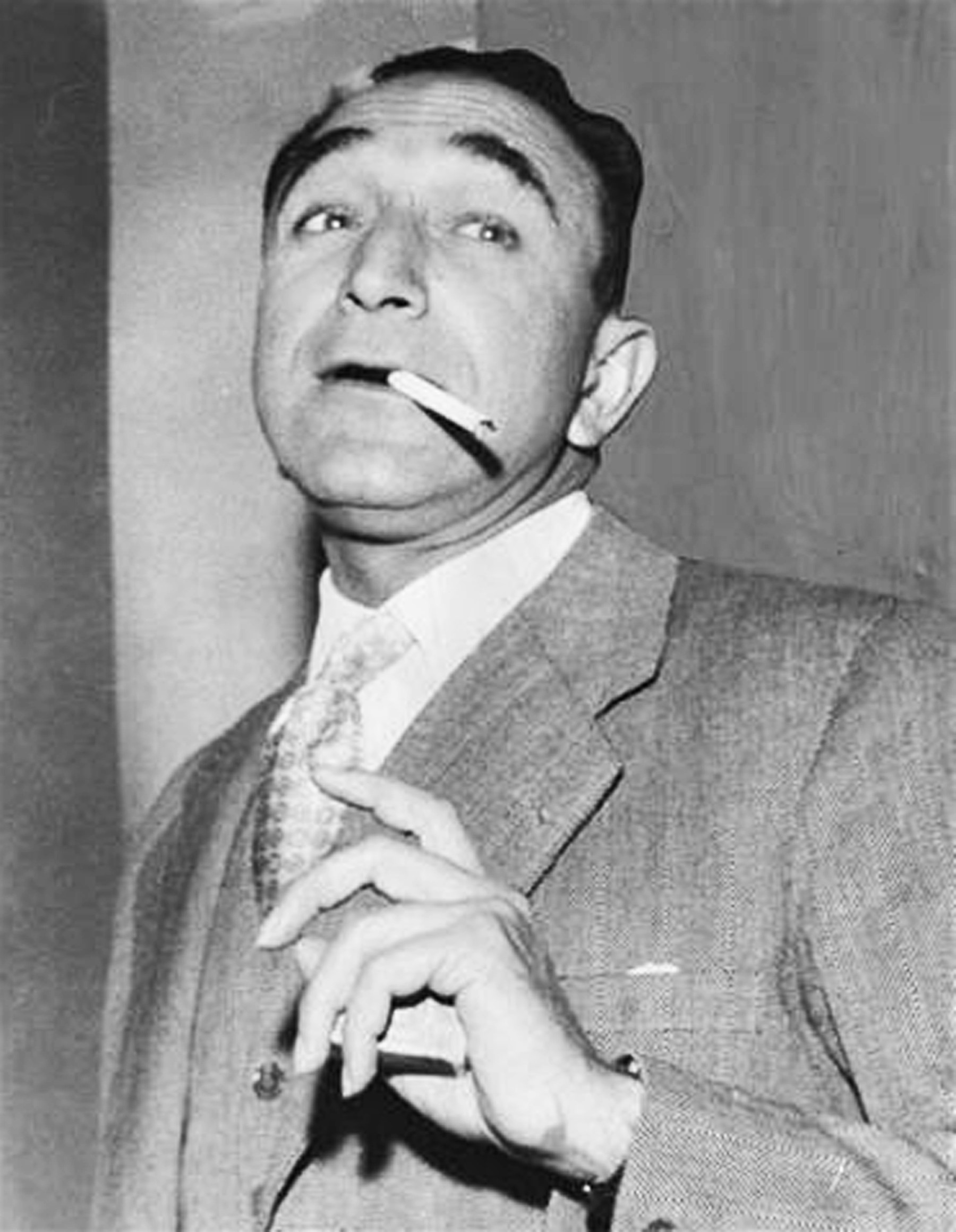
	First party	Second party
Leader	Amir-Abbas Hoveyda	Asadollah Alam
Party	New Iran Party	People's Party
Seats won	838	96
Seat change	▲32	▼30

The second local elections in Iran, and the first to elect the members of provincial and township councils (Anjoman), were held in September 1970. 960 seats for 150 councils were up for election.

== Results ==
According to Rouhollah K. Ramazani, New Iran Party gained more than 60% of the votes and 300 out of 960 seats while Dishon et al reported the number of seats won by each party as the following:

Party	Seats	Share (%)
New Iran Party	838	88.86
People's Party	96	10.18
Independents	9	0.95
Total	943	100
Source: Dishon et al.

=== By province ===
Province	Seats		
Province	New Iran Party	People's Party	Nonpartisan
Central	183 / 229	43 / 229	3 / 229
Khorasan	207 / 261	44 / 261	10 / 261
Esfahan	110 / 138	26 / 138	2 / 138
East Azerbaijan	179 / 252	79 / 252	0 / 252
Khuzestan	120 / 157	37 / 157	0 / 157
Mazandaran	178 / 209	31 / 209	0 / 209
Fars	139 / 160	9 / 160	12 / 160
Gilan	107 / 154	47 / 154	3 / 154
West Azerbaijan	107 / 132	25 / 132	0 / 132
Kerman	70 / 91	21 / 91	0 / 91
Kermanshah	58 / 83	24 / 83	1 / 83
Coastal	54 / 74	20 / 74	0 / 74
Sistan & Baluchestan	32 / 64	32 / 64	0 / 64
Kordestan	80 / 86	4 / 86	2 / 86
Hamedan	70 / 91	21 / 91	0 / 91
Lorestan	56 / 73	17 / 73	0 / 73
Zanjan	54 / 56	2 / 56	0 / 56
Yazd	37 / 41	4 / 41	0 / 41
Chaharmahal & Bakhtiari	33 / 34	1 / 34	0 / 34
Semnan	29 / 29	0 / 29	0 / 29
Ilam	8 / 35	25 / 35	2 / 35
Boyer-Ahmad & Kohgiluyeh	22 / 23	1 / 23	0 / 23
Total	1,927 / 2,472	510 / 2,472	35 / 2,472
Source: Ministry of Interior
