= Mohammad Ali Tarbiat =

Iranian statesman (1877–1940)

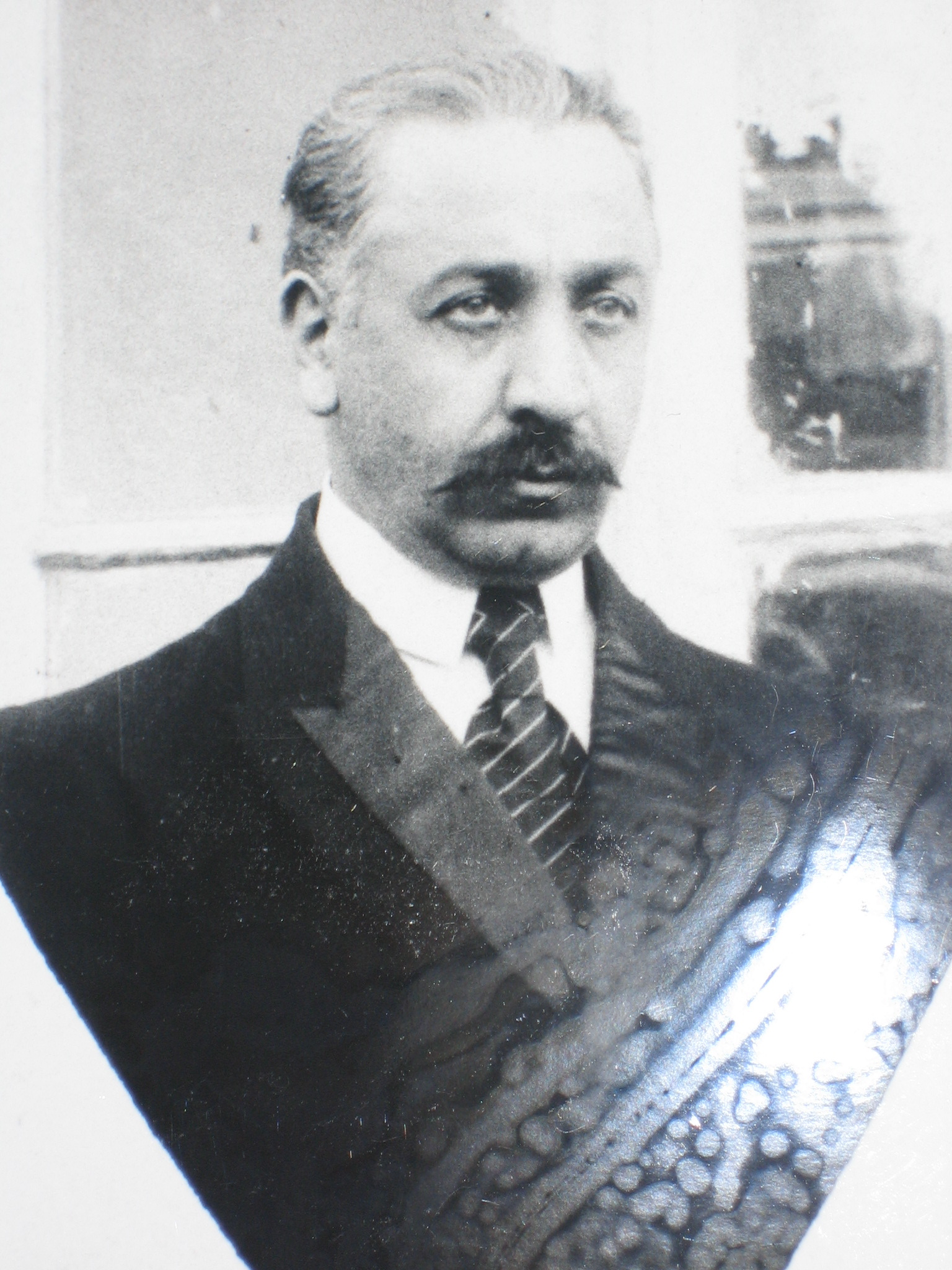

Mayor of Tabriz
- In office 1928–1931
- Monarch: Reza Shah
- Preceded by: Adel Zarabi
- Succeeded by: Arfaol-Malek

member of National Consultative Assembly
- In office 1931–1940

Personal details
- Born: 26 May 1877 Tabriz, Sublime State of Iran
- Died: 17 January 1940 (aged 62) Tehran, Imperial State of Iran
- Party: Democrat Party
- Spouse(s): Robabeh Tarbiat; Hajar Tarbiat
- Profession: Intellectual, political activist, politician, journalist

Mohammad Ali Tarbiat (Persian: محمدعلی تربیت; 26 May 1877 — 17 January 1940) was an Iranian revolutionary, politician and reformist. He founded the Tarbiat Library which was the first modern library in Iran. Tarbiat was a writer active in the Iranian Constitutional Revolution and a member of the National Consultative Assembly from the electorate of Tabriz (1931–1940).

== Biography ==
Born in 1877, Tarbiat was from the Nobar district of Tabriz in northwestern Iran. Through his paternal side, Tarbiat is considered by many sources to be the great-great-son of Mirza Mehdi Khan Astarabadi, the chief secretary of Nader Shah (r. 1736–1747) and author of the Jahangosha-ye Naderi ("Nader the World Conqueror"). However, Hassan Taqizadeh believed that Tarbiat's connection to Mirza Mehdi Khan Astarabadi was through the maternal side of his father or grandfather, based on a statement by a relative of Tarbiat's father. At Molla Zain al-Abedin's school, Tarbiat completed his elementary education. There, he studied law, Arabic literature, logic, philosophy, natural science, mathematics, astronomy, geometry, and jurisprudence. He completed his education in French and English from Mirza Nasrollah Khan Seif al-Atibba, and he finished his medical training under Mohammad Kermanshahi Kofri.

He taught natural sciences for two years at Dar el Fonoun in the higher education establishment (university) in Tabriz.

In 1904, he married Robabeh (sister of Hassan Taghizadeh) from which he had four children, two sons (Ardechir and Bahman), and two daughters (Farangis and Iran).

Forced into exile after the dissolution of the Majlis (parliament) in 1908, he moved with his family to Istanbul. He undertook many trips to European capitals, chiefly London and Berlin where his wife died.

At the end of World War I, he returned to Istanbul and married Hajar, daughter of a Persian embassy employee, with whom he had two sons named Firouz and Behrouz.

He permanently returned to Tabriz in 1921. He was in charge of the organization of education of the Azerbaijan province, after which, he became mayor of Tabriz from 1928 to 1931. From 1931 to 1940 he was a member of the parliament elected by Tabriz population. On 17 January 1940, he died in Tehran.

== Political activity ==
In the beginning years of the 1900s, together with Hassan Taghizadeh, he formed a militant group with young intellectuals aimed to modernize and westernize the country.

In 1905, he actively participated in the constitutional revolution. The Majlis (parliament) was founded in 1906; however, the constitutional revolution did not achieve its goals and in 1908 Mozzaffaredin Shah (Khadjar dynasty) had the Majlis bombarded resulting in the dissolving of the parliament.

In exile from 1908, Mohammed Ali Tarbiat continued his political activity in Istanbul and Berlin. Together with Hassan Taghizadeh and other activists he participated to the creation of Komiteh-ye IRAN (committee of Iran), as well as, in the publication of the Kaveh newspaper. The paper was written in Persian and published in Berlin from 1916 to 1922. It was a cultural and political journal, which proclaimed the necessity to carry out reforms in Iran and to preserve, the independence of Iran from foreign powers.

Under the reign of Reza Shah Pahlavi, Mohammad Ali Tarbiat was one of the founders of the Iranian democratic party (1930).

== Social activity ==
Together with the group created in 1900 he tried to pass on Western culture to the young. They founded the Tarbiat school and its library, with the aim of promoting science and foreign languages (French, English and Russian), as well as a newspaper and a printing project. Faced with the opposition of reactionary forces, particularly from the clergy, the project was abandoned.

Back in Tabriz, the different functions he occupied permitted him to promote culture and modernization of the Azerbaijan province.

In 1921, he created the first reading room and public library in Iran. Presently still in use, today it bears the name Tarbiat public library.

He created many schools, including the highly contested high school for girls.

He created the first public garden in Iran. This garden, called Golestan, is still today visited by the inhabitants of Tabriz.

In 2015 a statue representing Mohammad Ali Tarbiat was erected in Tabriz.

== Writings ==
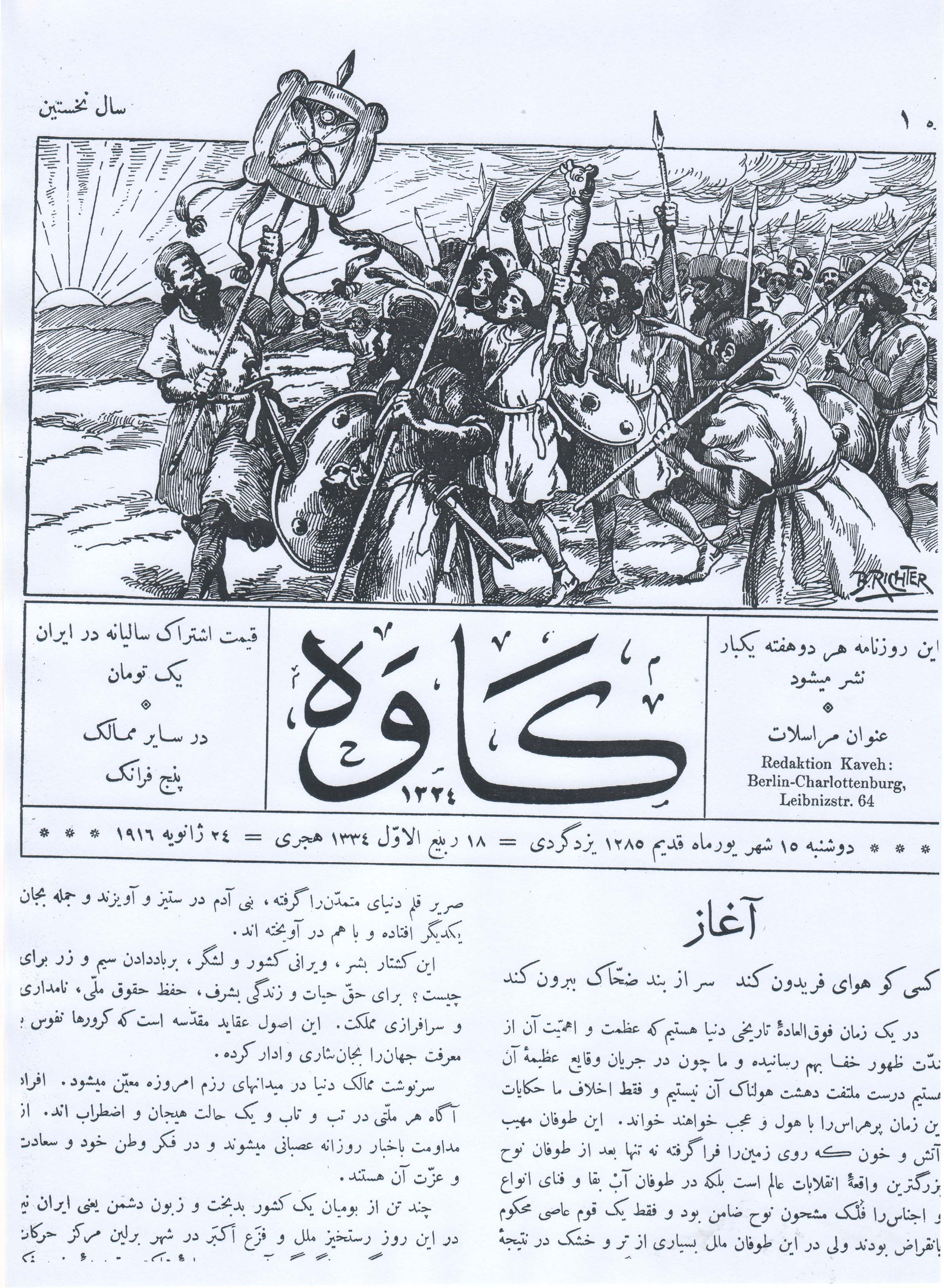
Kaveh Publication

Mohammad Ali Tarbiat has written several articles in journals particularly in the journal Kaveh published in Berlin.

He has written two books:

- The history of journalism in Iran
- The scholars of Azerbaijan

See also

- Tarbiyat street

== Sources ==
- Taheri, Farhad (2018). "تربیت، میرزا محمدعلی". The Great Islamic Encyclopaedia (in Persian).
