= Nayereh =

Nayereh is a given name of Iranian origin. Notable people with the name include:

- Nayereh Ebtehaj-Samii (1914–2017), Iranian educator and politician
- Nayereh Tohidi (born 1951), Iranian-born American professor, researcher, and academic administrator
