= 1961 Iranian legislative election =

- 10 January to 4 February 1961

All 200 seats to the National Consultative Assembly

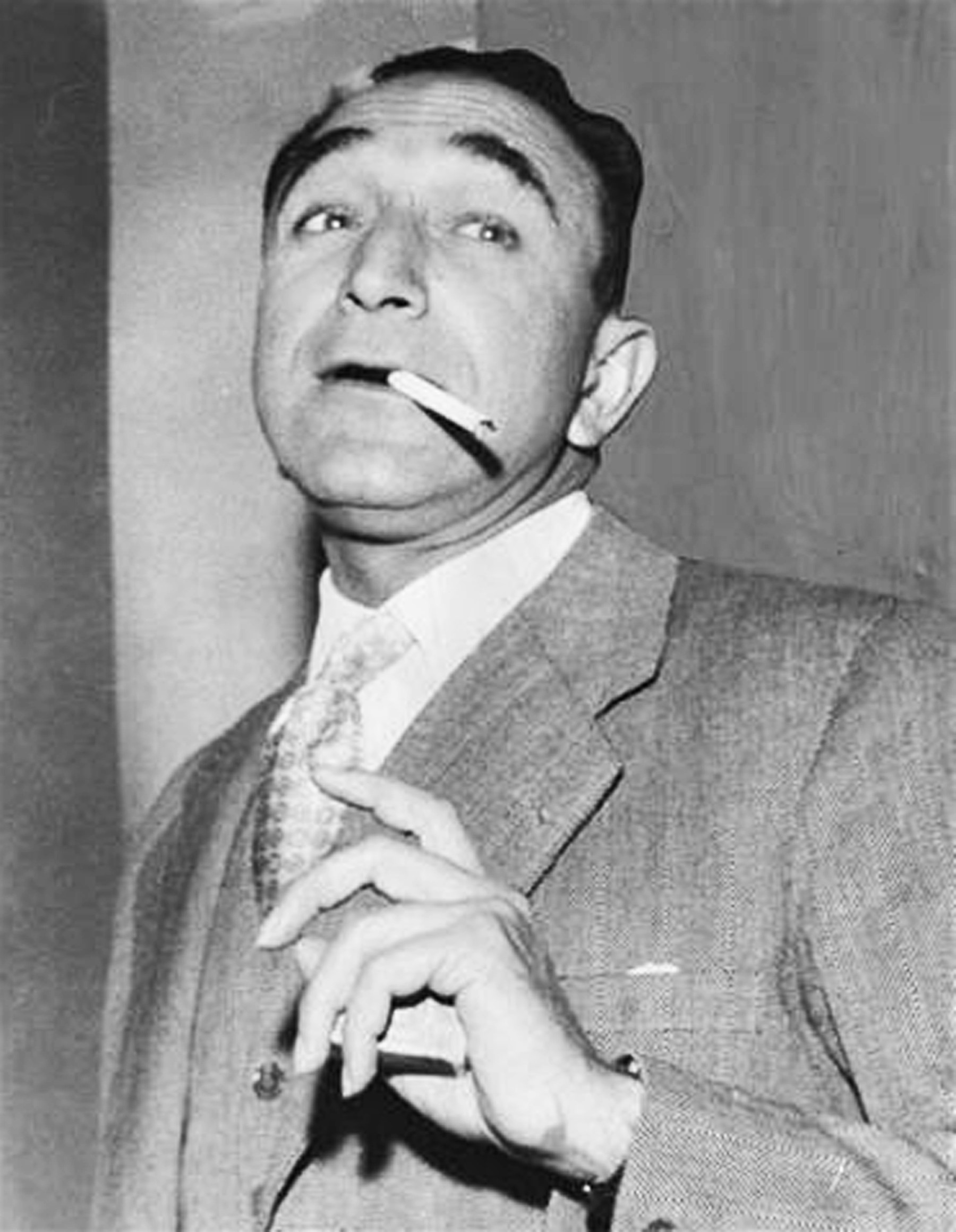
	First party	Second party
Leader	Manouchehr Eghbal	Asadollah Alam
Party	Party of Nationalists	People's Party
Alliance	—	—
Seats won	75	65
Seat change	▲29	▲15
- Composition of the Assembly following the election
Prime Minister before election
Jafar Sharif-Emami
Independent
Elected Prime Minister
Ali Amini
Independent

Parliamentary elections were held in Iran in 1961, after the elections the previous year had been annulled by the Shah. The result was a victory for the Party of Nationalists, which won a plurality of the seats.

National Front candidates had been forcibly prevented from campaigning, such as Boroumand in Isfahan. Among opposition, only Allahyar Saleh was able to win a seat in his native Kashan.

== Results ==
=== Zonis (1971) and Mehrdad (1980) ===
Party	Seats
Party of Nationalists	69
People's Party	64
Iran Party	1
Independents	31
Total	165
Source: Zonis and Mehrdad

=== Chehabi (1990) ===
Party	%
Party of Nationalists	45
People's Party	35
Independents	20
Total	100
Source: Chehabi

=== Nohlen et al. (2001) ===
Party	Seats
Party of Nationalists	75
People's Party	65
Independents	32
Others	28
Total	200
Source: Nohlen et al.
