= Senate of Iran =

Former upper house of the Iranian Parliament (1949–1979)

Coordinates: 35°41′16.82″N 51°23′58.72″E

Senate Persian: مجلس سنا, romanized: Majles-e Senā

Type
- Type: Upper house of Iran

History
- Founded: 25 January 1950
- Disbanded: 11 February 1979
- Seats: 60

Elections
- First election: 1949
- Last election: 1975

Meeting place
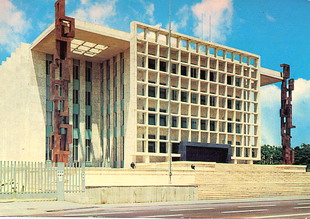
- Tehran, Iran

Constitution
- Persian Constitution of 1906

The Senate (Persian: مجلس سنا, romanized: Majles-e Senā) was the upper house legislative chamber in the Imperial State of Iran from 1949 to 1979. A bicameral legislature had been established in the 1906 Persian Constitutional Revolution but the Senate was not actually formed until after the 1949 Constituent Assembly election, as an expression of Shah Mohammad Reza Pahlavi's desire for more political power. Half of the sixty seats in the senate were directly appointed by the Shah, and the other half were directly elected, fifteen represented Tehran, and the rest were elected from other regions.

The Senate was disbanded after the Iranian Revolution in 1979 and was formally abolished on 1 April, when the new constitution established a unicameral legislature under the nascent Islamic Republic. As of 2023, the former Senate building was used by the Assembly of Experts.

== History ==
=== Constitution ===
Established as per Chapter 3, Article 45 of the Persian Constitution of 1906,

The Members of this Assembly shall be chosen from amongst the well-informed, discerning, pious and respected persons of the Realm. Thirty of them shall be nominated on the part of His Imperial Majesty (fifteen of the people of Tehran, and fifteen of the people of the Provinces), and thirty by the Nation (fifteen elected by the people of Tehran, and fifteen by the people of the Provinces).

=== Building ===
The Senate House of Iran was designed by architect Heydar Ghiaï in 1955. The construction was led by Rahmat Safai, the dome being one of the most technically challenging projects in the entire endeavor.

The building is depicted on the reverse of the Iranian 100 rials banknote.

Interior Dome of Senate Chamber, Heydar Ghiaï, Architect

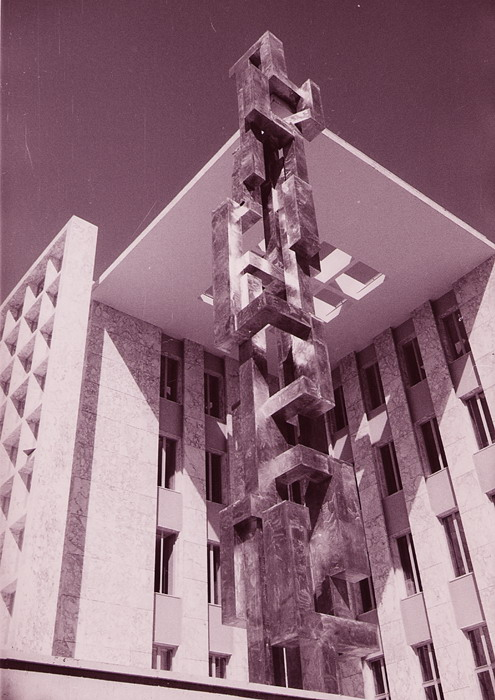
Column of main Facade, Heydar Ghiaï, Architect

=== Members ===
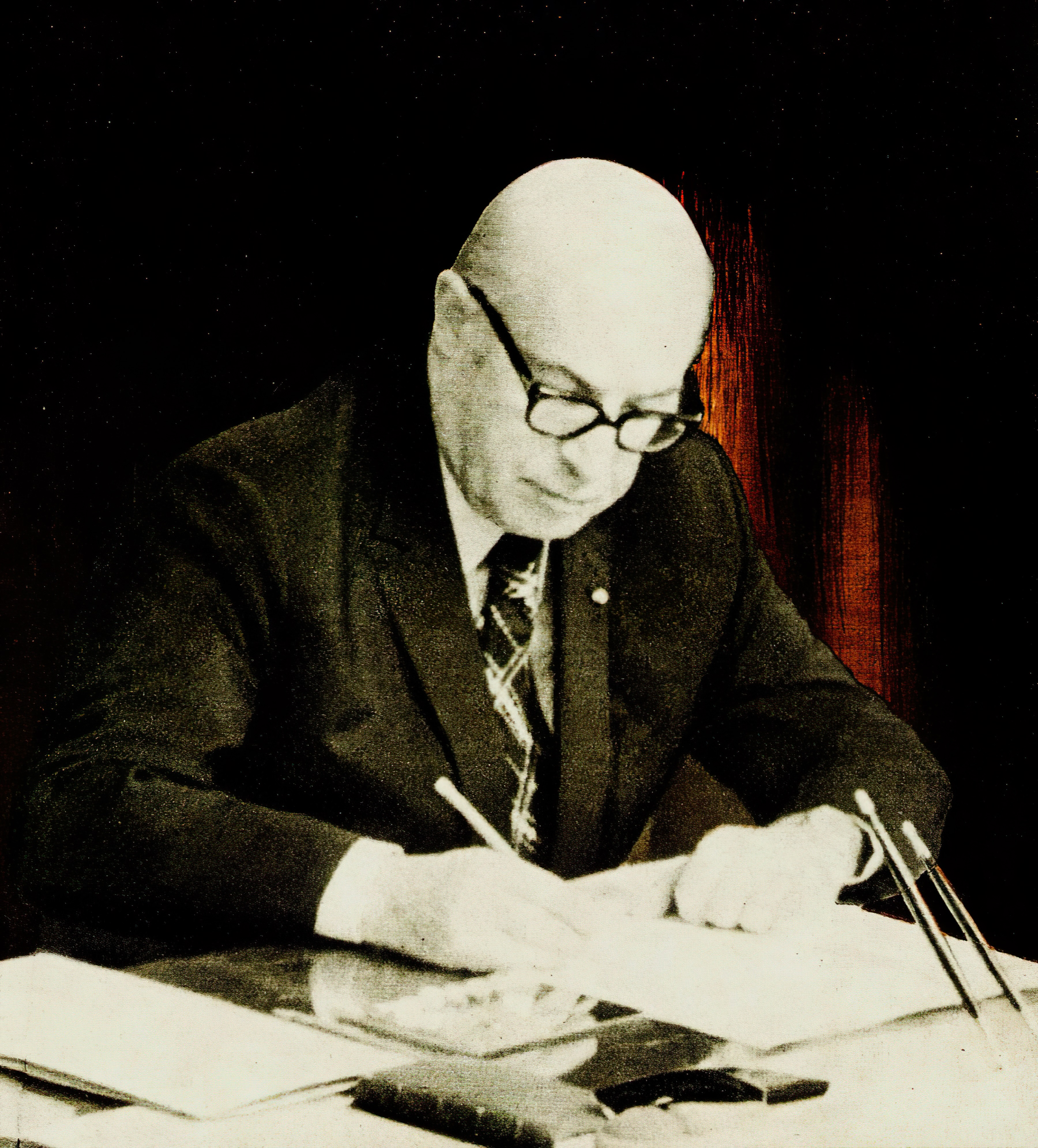
Jafar Sharif-Emami, as President of the Senate until 1978

- Mahmoud Hessaby (1951–1963).
- Ali Dashti for 1954–1979.
- Jafar Sharif-Emami, Prime Minister of Iran (1960–1961 & 1978), was a member of the Iranian Senate. He was its President for a number of years.
- Jamshid Aalam (1973–1979)

=== List of speakers ===
Name	Term of office	
Ebrahim Hakimi	19 August 1951	1 March 1957
Hassan Taqizadeh	1 March 1957	1 September 1960
Mohsen Sadr	11 September 1960	11 September 1964
Jafar Sharif-Emami	11 September 1964	24 March 1978
Mohammad Sajadi	24 March 1978	10 February 1979

=== Dissolution ===
During its years of activity, the Senate was once dissolved in May 1961.

Following the Iranian revolution in 1979, the government became unicameral, the senate was dissolved and the new Majlis convened in the senate building.

== Elections ==
=== Votes cast ===
Provincial Capital	Seats	Votes Cast		
Provincial Capital	Seats	1963	1967	1971
Tehran	15	347,358	393,538	542,877
Qazvin	1	63,272	393,538	258,616
Mashhad	2	41,179	213,750	314,941
Esfahan	1	48,613	98,117	333,120
Tabriz	2	21,450	23,392	100,299
Ahvaz	1	111,538	142,832	275,907
Sari	1	149,512	173,126	265,106
Shiraz	2	Unknown	235,745	230,507
Rasht	1	Unknown	21,243	168,097
Rezaieh	1	42,712	86,999	101,998
Kerman	1	26,852	68,525	240,384
Kermanshah	1	Unknown	197,214	143,219
Hamedan	1	153,481	155,523	221,754
Total Votes	30	+1,000,000	1,810,004	3,196,825
Source: Ministry of Interior

=== Seats won ===
Year	Majority party		Loyal opposition		Ref
Year	Party	Seats	Party	Seats	Ref
1963	New Iran Party	Unknown	People's Party	Unknown	
1967	New Iran Party	26 / 30(87%)	People's Party	4 / 30(13%)	IPU
1971	New Iran Party	28 / 30(93%)	People's Party	2 / 30(7%)	IPU
1975	Resurgence Party	30 / 30(100%)	—N/a		IPU

== Composition ==
=== 1967 ===
As of 1967, the composition of the Senate included 48 members of the ruling New Iran Party and 11 members of the loyal opposition People's Party, while one senator was unaffiliated.

↓
11	1	48
People's Party	Independent	New Iran Party

=== 1971 ===
As of 1971, neither the New Iran Party nor the People's Party held a majority in the Senate, and had 27 and 9 members respectively. The remaining 24 senators were nonpartisan.

↓
9	24	27
People's Party	Independent	New Iran Party

=== 1975 ===
In 1975, all senator were members of the country's single-party.

↓
60
Resurgence Party

== Major events ==
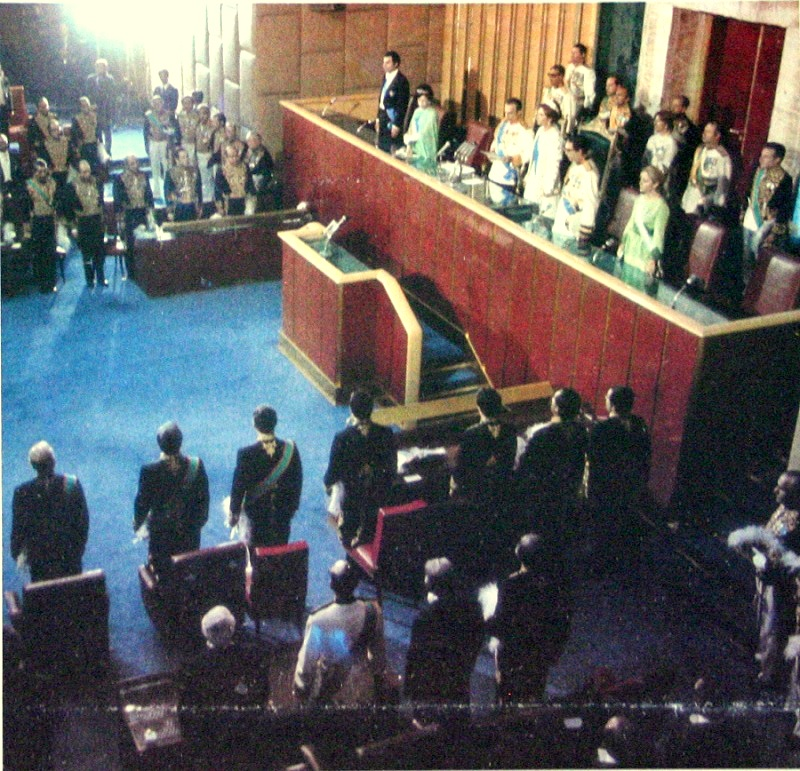
Shah Mohammad Reza Pahlavi and the Imperial Family at the Iranian Senate, Tehran, 1975

- 1950 (9 February), first inaugural session presided over by Mohammad Reza Pahlavi.
- 1952, Mohammad Mosaddegh managed to obtain power to rule by decree — first, for a six-month period and then extended — due to his popularity. Later, he organized a plebiscite in 1953, won the votes, and dissolved both the Majlis and Senate. Upon Mossadeq's ouster, the legislative bodies were revived.
- 1961, Mohammad Reza Pahlavi dissolved both the Majlis and Senate; some time later they were restored.
- 1979 Senate approves the government of Shapour Bakhtiar.

== Bibliography ==
- M. Ghiai, Iran Senate House, Max Gerard Edt.Draeger Paris, 1976 ISBN 2-85119-008-3
