= Nationalists' Party =

1957–1963 political party in Pahlavi-era Iran

Nationalists' Party حزب ملیون
- Leader: Manouchehr Eghbal
- General Secretary: Nosratollah Kasemi
- Founder: Manouchehr Eghbal
- Founded: 1957
- Dissolved: 15 December 1963
- Succeeded by: New Iran Party
- Ideology: Pahlavi royalism National conservatism
- Political position: Right-wing

The Party of Nationalists or Nationalists' Party (Persian: حزب ملیون, romanized: Ḥezb-e Melliun) was a conservative political party in Pahlavi era Iran, and government majority party from 1957 to 1960. The party was founded in 1957 by Manouchehr Eghbal on orders directed by Shah to initiate a two-party system. Its opposition was the liberal People's Party.

The party's name was deliberately chosen in a way to confuse the public, because the term Melliun (lit. 'Nationalists') was already in use to refer to members of the opposition National Front and other followers of Mohammad Mossadegh.

== Electoral history ==
Election	Seats	+/−	Ref
1956	71 / 136(52%)	—N/a	
~~1960~~	104 / 200(52%)	—N/a	
1961	75 / 200(38%)	▲4	

Ruling party of Iran
Vacant	Nationalists’ Party; 1957–1963	Succeeded by New Iran Party
