= Mirza Mehdi Khan Astarabadi =

Historian, ambassador, and confidant to Nader Shah

- میرزا مهدی خان استرآبادی
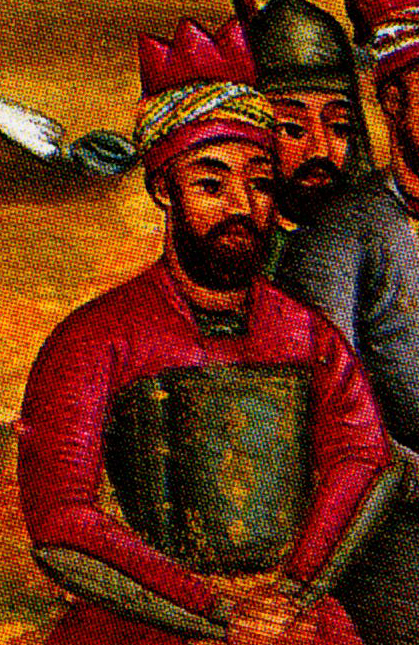
- Born: 18th century "presumably" Astarabad (present-day Gorgan)
- Died: Sometime between 1759 and 1768
- Writing career
- Notable work: Jahangosha-ye Naderi

Mirza Mehdi Khan Astarabadi (Persian: میرزا مهدی خان استرآبادی), also known by his title of Monshi-ol-Mamalek (منشی الممالک), was the chief secretary, historian, biographer, advisor, strategist, friend and confidant of Nader Shah (r. 1736–1747). He wrote and accepted the different decisions and files related to the Empire.

== Biography ==
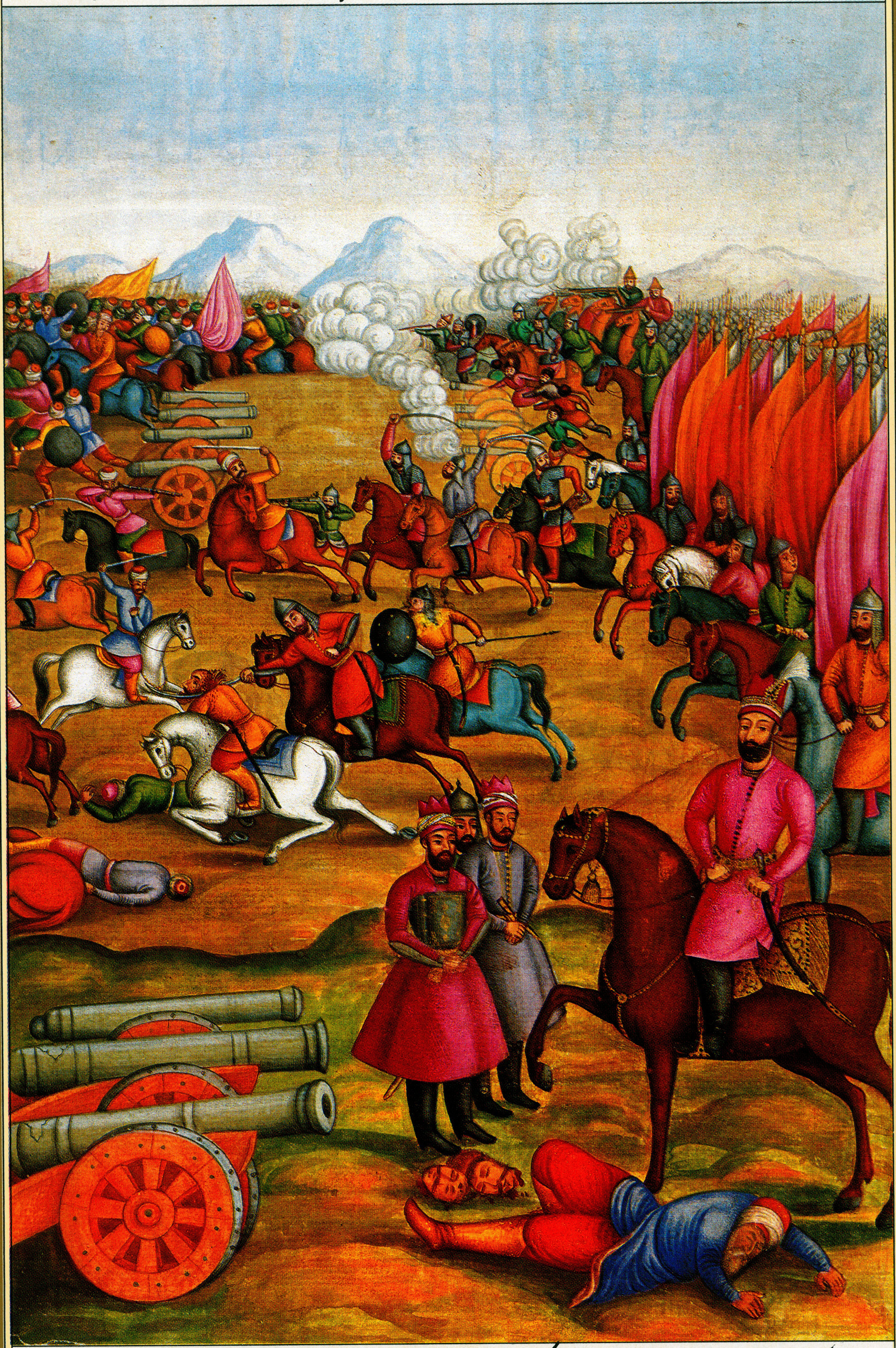
Picture showing Mirza Mehdi Khan in pink clothes holding a book, with Nader Shah Afshar on horseback; at the Battle of Kirkuk with the corpse of the Ottoman general Topal Osman Pasha laid before the Shah (zoomed out).

Even though Mirza Mehdi rose to become an eminent figure in 18th century Iran, not much is known about his life. A native of Astarabad (present-day Gorgan), he was the son of a certain Mohammad-Nasir, and he presumably spent his young life in Isfahan during the late Safavid period, where he practised to become a civil servant.

During the reign of the last Safavid shah, Soltan Hoseyn (r. 1696–1722), the Afghans attacked Iran. When military chief Nader Shah expelled the Afghans, Mirza Mehdi Khan supported him in the Safavid court. During his long service to Nader, he first functioned as "head of the royal correspondance" (Monshi-ol-Mamalek), until Nader's coronation at the Mughan plain in 1736. Afterwards, he became his official biographer and historiographer.

During Nader Shah's Dagestan campaign, he accompanied him. About Nader's disembarking he noted "The banners that conquered the world are leaving Iran and heading to Dagestan".

In early 1747, Astarabadi was sent as an ambassador to the Ottoman Empire together with Mostafa Khan Bigdeli Shamlu in order to ratify the Treaty of Kerden (1746). However, they had only reached Baghdad when the embassy learned about Nader Shah's death, which forced them go back to Iran. Everything remains unknown regarding the fate of his subsequent career. He must have "evidently" retired from public life in order to be able to finish the philological and historical works which he had been compiling during his service to Nader. The Iranian intellectual and journalist Mohammad Ali Tarbiat (died 1940) was a descendant of Astarabadi.

== Works ==
He was the author of historical books such as Tarikh-e Jahangosha-ye Naderi (History of Nadir Shah's Wars), which is a book studied in the Yale University and has this presentation : « Tarikh-i Nadiri. A history of Nadir shah Afshar, who ruled Iran from 1736 to 1747, written in Persian by Mahdi Khan Astarabadi (d. 1759), his secretary and court historian ». This book was also the object of research in 1996 by United States Naval Academy. Mirza Mehdi Khan also wrote "Dareh Nadareh" and "A Persian Guide to the Turkish Language" in 1759 with an introduction of Sir Gerard Clauson.

In 1768, King Christian VII of Denmark visited England. He took with him the book of Nader Shah, written by Mirza Mehdi Khan Astarabadi and asked Sir William Jones (1746–1794), orientalist and specialist in the history of old India, to translate it into French. This, in turn, led to the publication of the (not entirely accurate) book, "Histoire de Nader Chah", in 1770. This translation by William Jones was then later translated into German and Georgian.

== Sources ==
- Bosworth, C.E.; van Donzel, E.; Lewis, B.; Pellat, Ch., eds. (1985). The Encyclopaedia of Islam (Vol. 5, fasc. 97–98). BRILL.
- Perry, J.R. (1987). "ASTARĀBĀDĪ, MAHDĪ KHAN". Encyclopaedia Iranica, Vol. II, Fasc. 8. pp. 844–845.
- Nabi, Hadi (1995). "Dictionary of Indo-Persian Literature". Abhinav. ISBN 9788170173113.
- Narayan Jagadish, Sarkar (1982). "Romance of Historiography from Shah Alam I to Shah Alam II (non-European)". Ratna Prakashan.
- Soltani, Mohammad Ali (1999). "political parties & secret societies in Kermanshah". Tehran.
- Taheri, Farhad (2018). "تربیت، میرزا محمدعلی". The Great Islamic Encyclopaedia (in Persian).
