= 1949 Iranian Senate election =

- late August 1949 (first round)

30 seats to the Senate

The first elections for the Senate of Iran were held in two-round system with the primary stage beginning in late August 1949 [Šahrīvar 1328 SH]. The elections aroused little enthusiasm in the country; voting was restricted to the literate citizens. In Tehran, only 15,280 votes were cast.
