= 1960 Iranian general election =

1960 Iranian legislative election
- 30 July / 3–20 August 1960

All 200 seats to the National Consultative Assembly

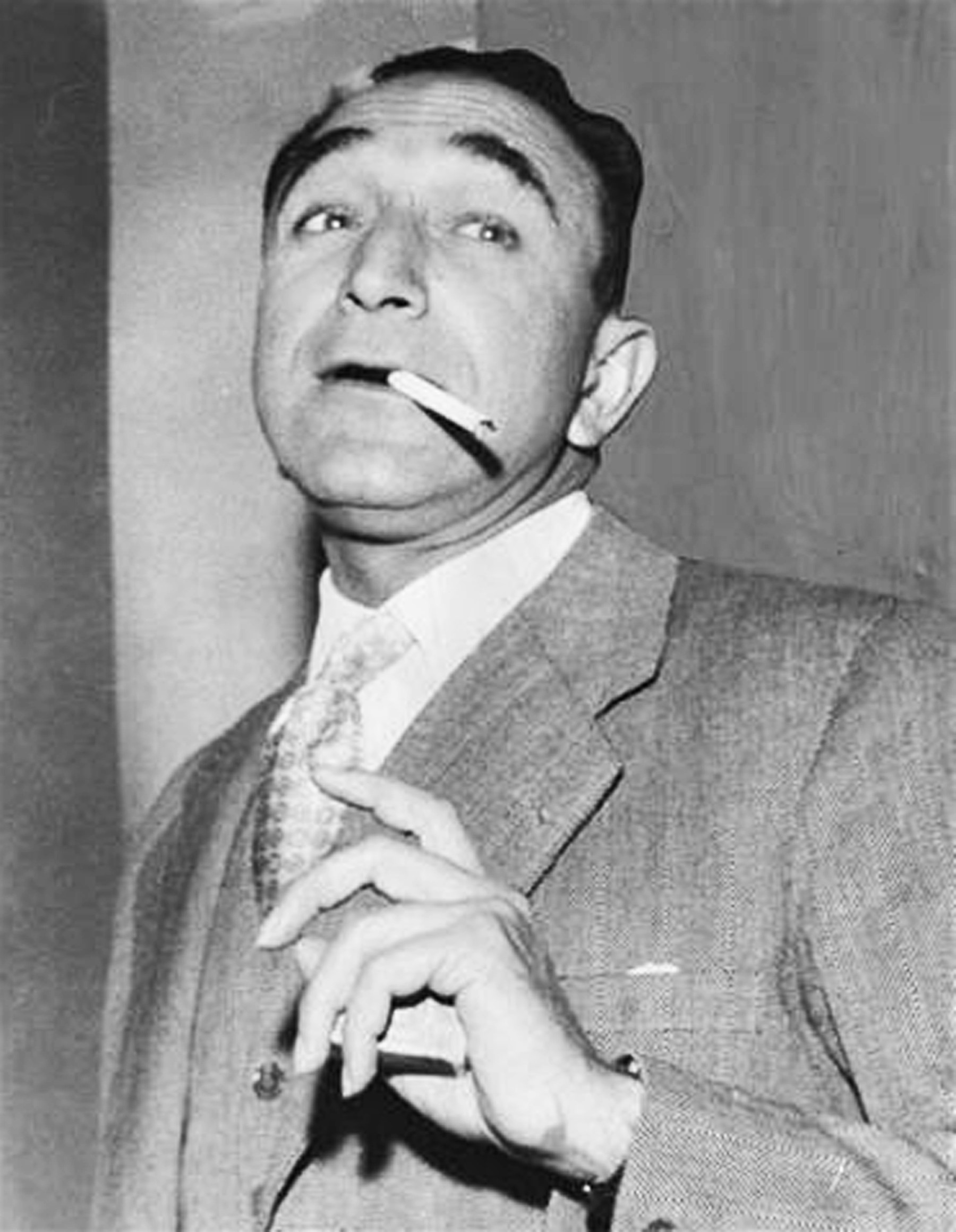

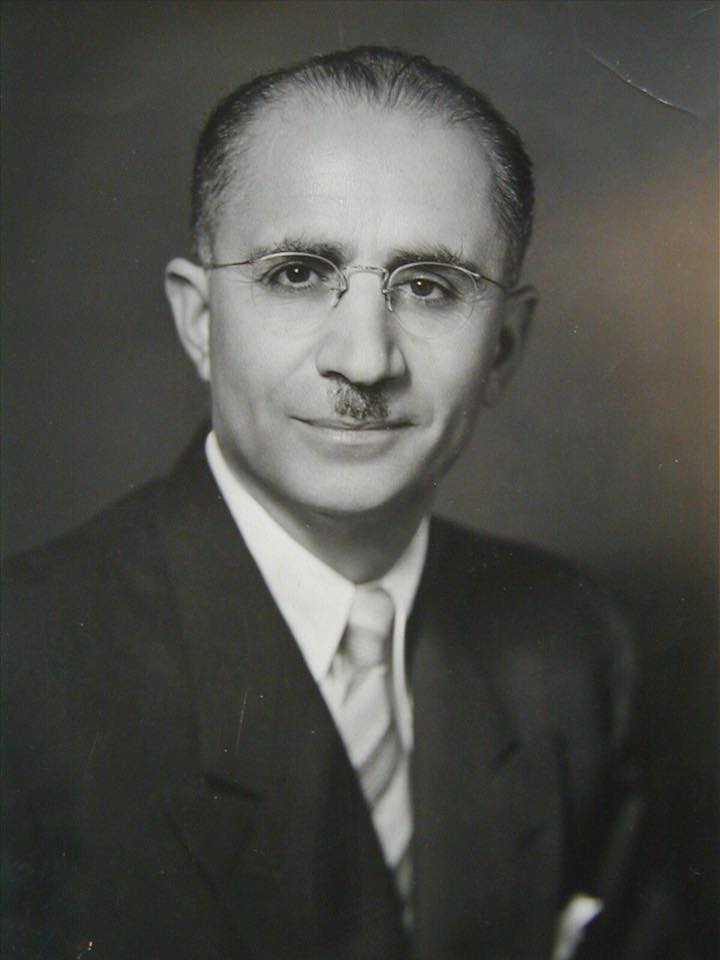
	Majority party	Minority party
Leader	Manouchehr Eghbal	Asadollah Alam
Party	Party of Nationalists	People's Party
Seats won	104	25≈50
	Third party	Fourth party
Leader	Mozzafar Baghai	Allahyar Saleh
Party	Toilers Party	Parties: Iran Party; Nation Party; League of Socialists; Party of the Iranian People
Alliance	—	National Front
- Composition of the Assembly following the election. Members not belonging to the Party of Nationalists or People's Party are shown in gray.
Prime Minister before election
Manouchehr Eghbal
Party of Nationalists
Elected Prime Minister
Jafar Sharif-Emami
Independent

Parliamentary elections were held in Iran between 30 July and 20 August 1960.

In order to demonstrate the appearance of a democratic free election, the Shah allowed candidates from the popular National Front to compete, however it returned no seats for them.

The announced result was a massive victory for the Prime Minister Eghbal's Party of Nationalists. The elections "were extensively and clumsily rigged" and the fraud "was exposed in the press, provoked public rancor and restlessness".

Aside from the opposition figures, pseudo-opposition People's Party and a number of independents led by Ali Amini denounced the elections. The results were annulled by the Shah, and fresh elections were held the following year.

== Results ==
=== Zonis (1971) and Mehrdad (1980) ===
Party	Seats
Party of Nationalists	104
People's Party	50
Independents	3
Source: Zonis and Mehrdad

=== Chehabi (1990) ===
Party	Seats
Party of Nationalists	104
People's Party	25
Source: Chehabi

== See also ==
- List of annulled elections
