= 1968 Iranian local elections =

- 4 October 1968

1,068 seats in 173 local Councils
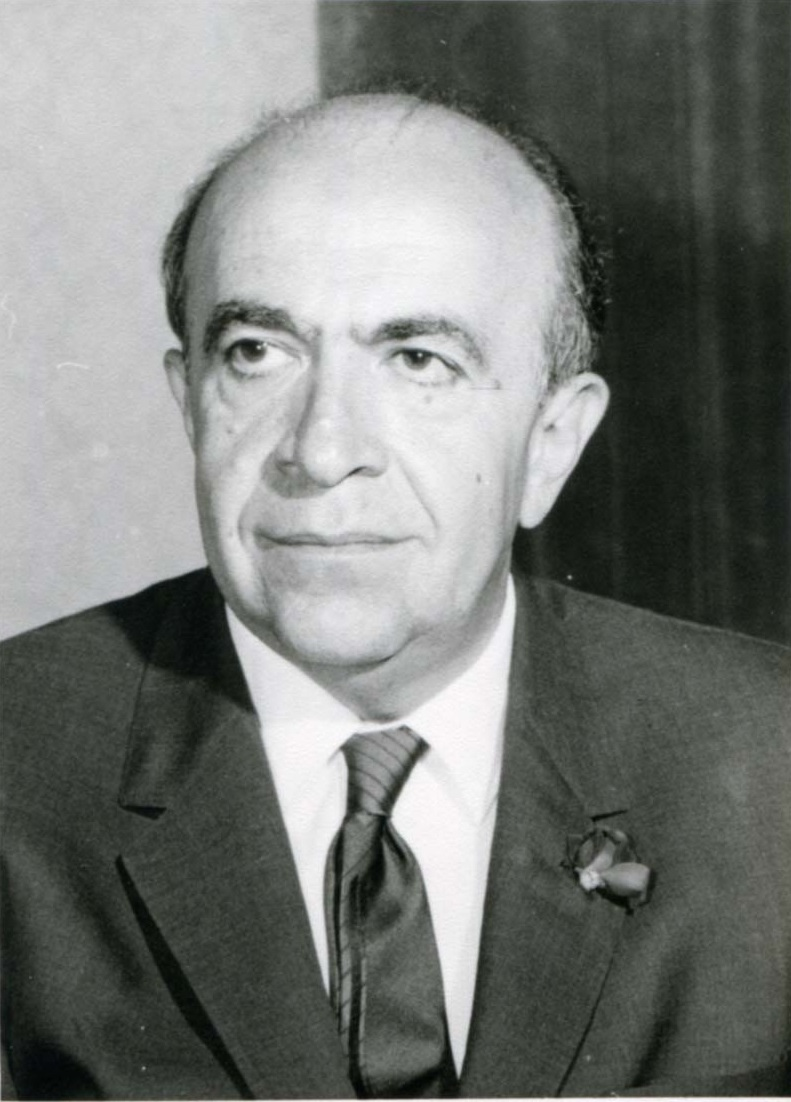

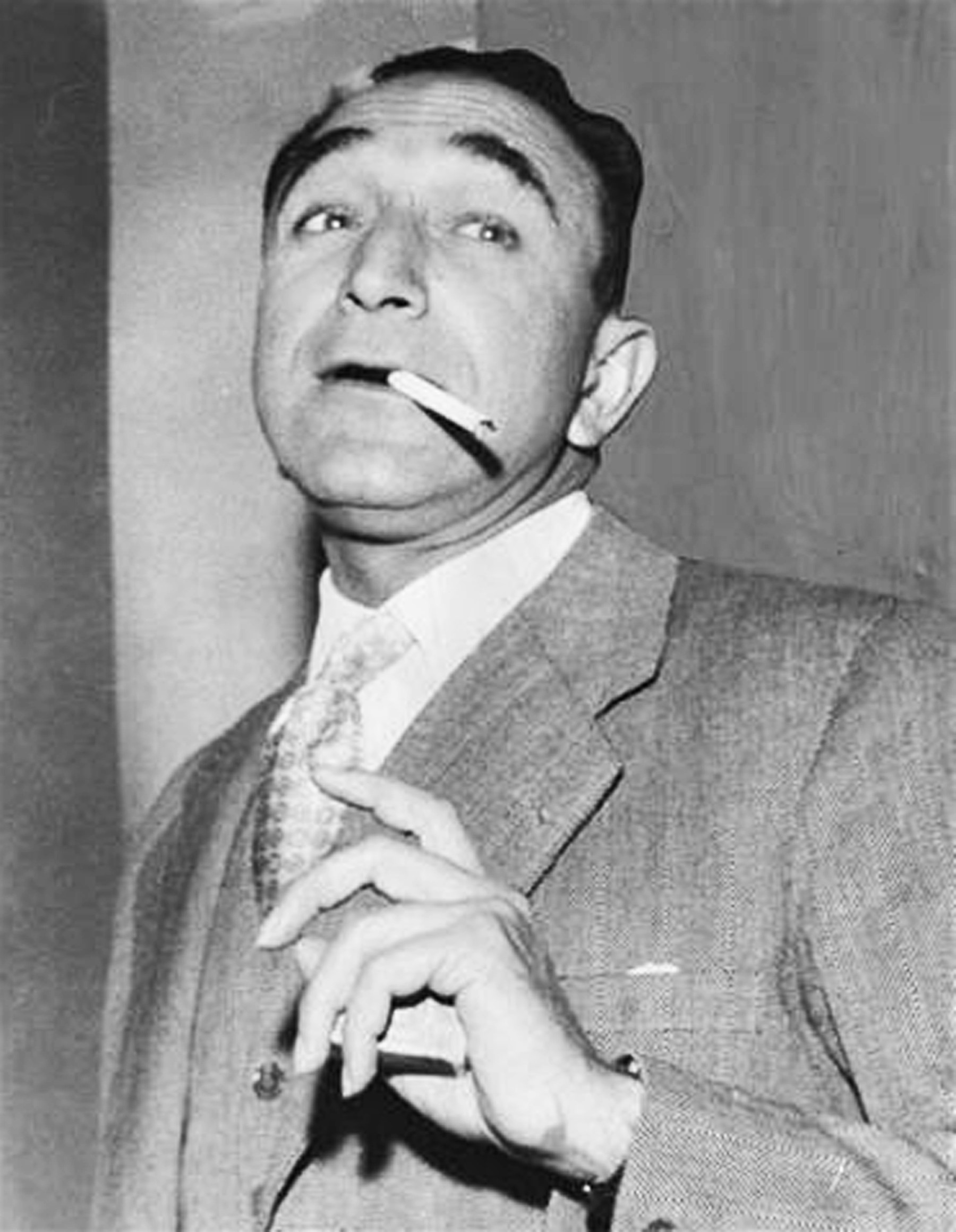

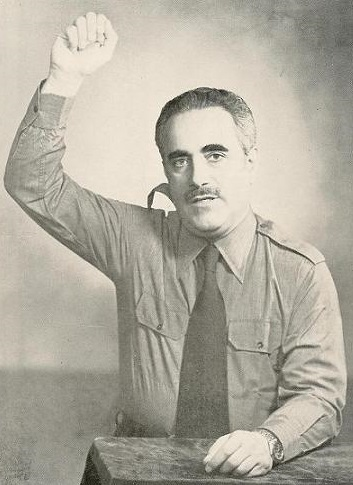
	First party	Second party	Third party
Leader	Amir-Abbas Hoveyda	Asadollah Alam	Mohsen Pezeshkpour
Party	New Iran Party	People's Party	Pan-Iranist Party
Seats won	806	126	20

The first ever local elections in Iran were held in 1968, to elect the members of city and town municipal councils (Anjoman). The elections were scheduled for the beginning of May, however after being delayed several times, it started on 4 October 1968 for 175 local councils.

The result was a victory for the New Iran Party.

According to Dilip Hiro, 90% of the voters in Tehran abstained, a way to mildly express dissent.

== Results ==
Out of 173 councils up for election, the results for 7 cities were annulled, including Sanandaj, Mehriz, Nahavand and Khansar. The New Iran Party managed to gain majority in 148 councils and in 115 of them, it won all of the seats (including the capital, Tehran). People's Party came up second, gaining control of 12 councils while the Pan-Iranist Party won in 2 councils, in Shushtar and in Khorramshahr. Non-partisan candidates shaped the majority in 4 cities, including Dehloran, Amirkola, Rey and Nur.

Party	Seats	Share (%)
New Iran Party	806	75.47%
People's Party	126	11.80%
Pan-Iranist Party	20	1.87%
Independents	116	10.86%
Total	1,068	100%
Source: Smith and Dishon
