= 1972 Iranian local elections =

- 3 October 1972

3,786 council seats nationwide

The third local elections in Iran were held on 3 October 1972 to elect the members of city and town municipal councils. As expected, the New Iran Party overtook the People's Party to win 80% of the vote. Out of 3,786 seats nationwide, they won 3,246.

People's Party won only 1.5% of total votes in Tehran, while in the provinces New Iran Party had more than 90% of the popular vote.
