= Jahangosha-ye Naderi =

Historical chronicle on the events during the reign of Nader Shah

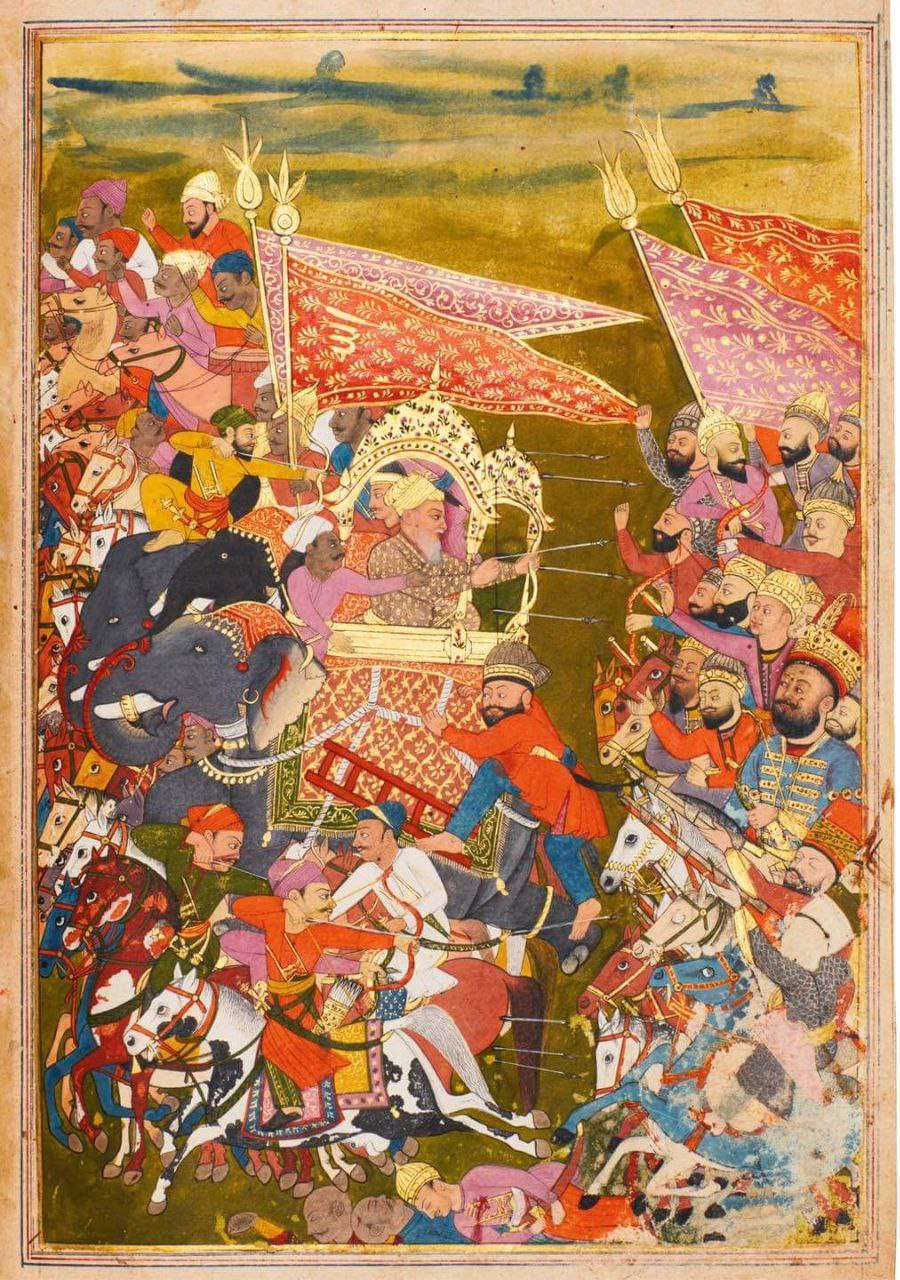
- An illustrated page of a copy of the Jahangosha-ye Naderi, showing Nader Shah fighting the Mughal army. Created in northern India in 1757/58
- Author: Mirza Mehdi Khan Astarabadi
- Language: Persian
- Genre: History
- Publication date: 1750s

The Jahangosha-ye Naderi (Persian: جهانگشای نادری) is a Persian-language historical chronicle on the events during the reign of Nader Shah (r. 1736–1747), the Afsharid shah (king) of Iran. It was composed in the 1750s by Mirza Mehdi Khan Astarabadi, Nader Shah's court historian and official historiographer. It is among the most important records of Nader Shah's rule.

The title "Jahangosha-ye Naderi", which originally read "Tarikh-e Naderi", is a reference to Ata-Malik Juvayni's history of the Mongol Empire, the Tarikh-i Jahangushay. Despite this, the two books do not share many close similarities in their style or structure. Astarabadi was unsure of how to honor Nader Shah because of the succession disputes that emerged in Iran after his death. A brief line at the end of several editions of Astarabadi's work clarified that the author's intention was to document Nader Shah's life events rather than to address the turmoil that had developed following his death. A short homage to Mohammad Hasan Khan Qajar, dated 1758, appears at the end of a few versions of the text. The absence of continuity in dynastic authority in the 18th-century made it more difficult for court chroniclers of the time to commemorate kings through panegyric praises.

Throughout the early Qajar period, many Persian court histories were stylistically based on the Jahangosha-ye Naderi. The many lithographic versions of this book that started to appear in the middle of the 19th-century are proof of its enduring appeal throughout Asia and the Middle East. It was also one of the earliest early modern Persian histories to be translated into a European language because of its release at a period when Europeans were beginning to recognize Iran's significance in international politics. The British orientalist William Jones translated this work into French for the king of Denmark, Christian VII and published it in 1770. A few years later, his translation became available in German and English.

The prestige of the Qajars started to gradually diminish following their military losses against the Russian Empire, who gained control over a lot of Iranian territory. These setbacks made the Iranians desire for a success tale, and can be directly linked to Nader Shah's ongoing, and even increasing, popularity among Iranians, as demonstrated by the more than fourteen published editions of the Jahangosha-ye Naderi.

== Sources ==
- Dabashi, Hamid (2014). The Persian Prince: The Rise and Resurrection of an Imperial Archetype. Stanford University Press. ISBN 978-1503628823.
- Matthee, Rudi (2018). "Nādir Shāh in Iranian Historiography: Warlord or National Hero?". In Schmidtke, Sabine (ed.). Studying the Near and Middle East at the Institute for Advanced Study, Princeton, 1935–2018. Gorgias Press. pp. 467–474.
- Tucker, Ernest (2008). "Jahāngošā-ye Nāderi". In Yarshater, Ehsan (ed.). Encyclopædia Iranica. Vol. XIV/4: Jade III–Jamalzadeh, Mohammad-Ali II. Work. London and New York: Routledge & Kegan Paul. pp. 382–383. ISBN 978-1-934283-04-2.
