= 1976 Iranian local elections =

- 15 October 1976

Local elections were held in Iran on 15 October 1976 to elect the members of 435 municipal councils, 162 city and town councils, and 238 regional educational councils. They were the first local elections to be held during rule of the one-party state under the Resurgence Party.
