= 1971 Iranian general election =

- 9 July 1971

All 268 seats in the National Consultative Assembly 30 out of 60 seats in the Senate
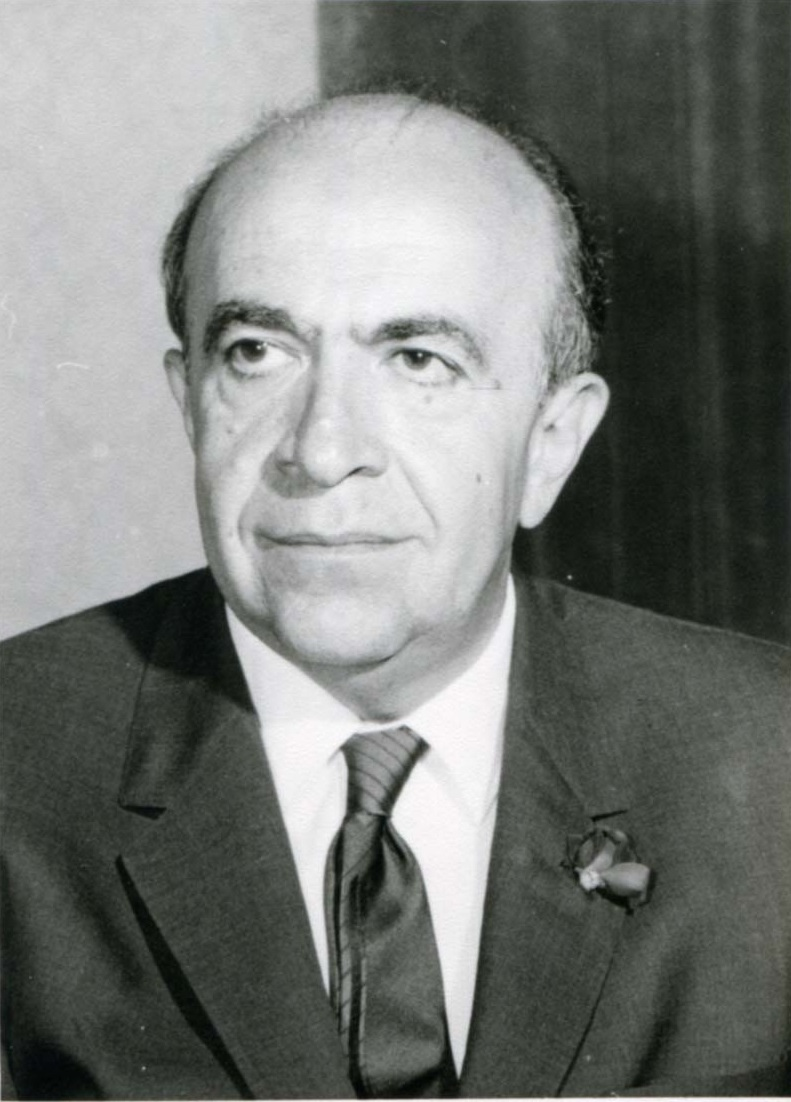

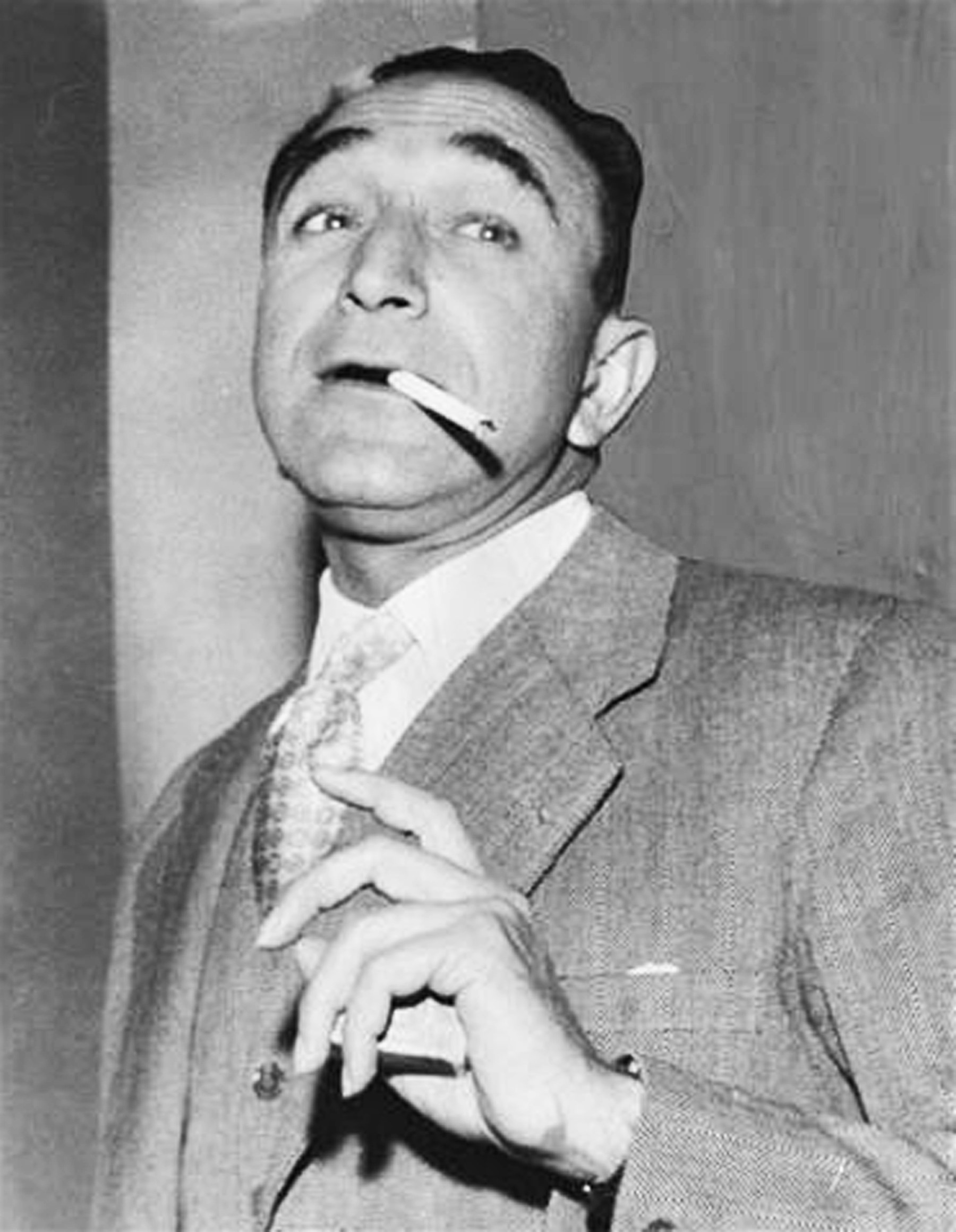
	First party	Second party
Leader	Amir-Abbas Hoveyda	Asadollah Alam
Party	Iran Novin	People's
Majlis seats	230	37
Seat change	▲50	▲6
Senate seats	28	2
Seat change	▲2	▼2
Prime Minister before election
Amir-Abbas Hoveyda
New Iran Party
Elected Prime Minister
Amir-Abbas Hoveyda
New Iran Party

Parliamentary elections were held in Iran on 9 July 1971. The result was a victory for the New Iran Party, which won 230 of the 268 seats in the Majlis and 28 of the 30 elected seats in the Senate. Voter turnout was around 35%. The elections were boycotted by the Pan-Iranist Party, which complained that the government held a monopoly over campaign broadcasts on state radio and television, and also claimed that its newspaper had been censored. Its offshoot, Iranians' Party, won a seat by its secretary-general.

Following the elections, Prime Minister Amir-Abbas Hoveyda formed a new government on 13 September.

The elections were "rigged and far from a legitimate process".

== Results ==
=== Majlis ===
Party	Seats	+/–
Iran Novin Party	230	+50
People's Party	37	+6
Independents	1	–2
Total	268	+49
Source: IPU

=== Senate ===
Party	Seats	+/–
Iran Novin Party	28	+2
People's Party	2	–2
Independents	0	0
Appointed seats	30	0
Total	60	0
Source: IPU

== See also ==
- 1974 Shahsavar by-election
