= 1975 Iranian general election =

1975 Iranian legislative election
- 20 June 1975

All 268 seats in the National Consultative Assembly 30 out of 60 seats in the Senate
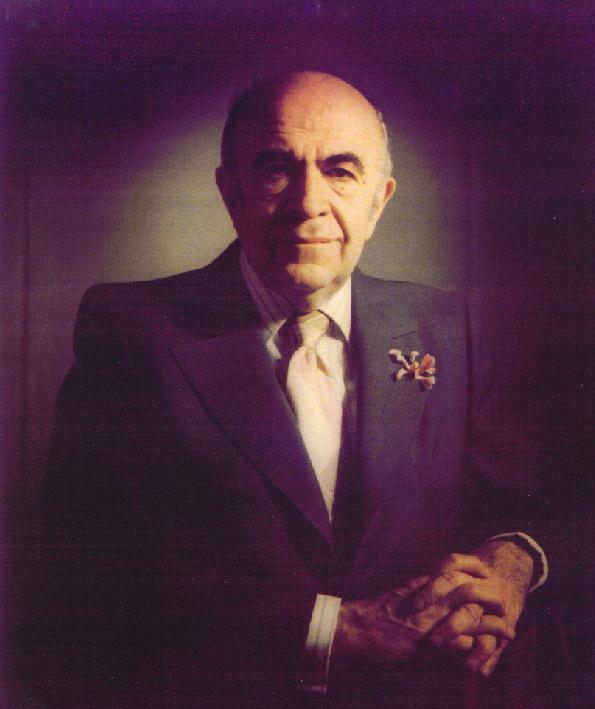
| | First party |
|---|---|
| Leader | Amir-Abbas Hoveyda |
| Party | Rastakhiz Party |
| Majlis votes | 100% |
| Majlis seats | 268 |
| Seat change | New |
| Senate votes | 100% |
| Senate seats | 30 |
| Seat change | New |
- Composition of the Senate of Iran following the election. Royally appointed seats are shown in gray.

- Composition of the Assembly following the election. All seats were won by the Rastakhiz Party, the only legal party at the time.
Prime Minister before election
Amir-Abbas Hoveyda
Rastakhiz Party
Elected Prime Minister
Amir-Abbas Hoveyda
Rastakhiz Party

Parliamentary elections were held in Iran on 20 June 1975. All 268 seats were won by the new monarchist party, the Rastakhiz Party. Voter turnout was 78.6%, although according to official reports, for both houses, out of an electorate of 14 million, 70 percent (9.8 million) registered to vote and 78 percent of the electorate (about 7 million) cast its vote.

This was the final election held under the rule of the Shah of Iran before the Iranian Revolution of 1979.

== Campaign ==
Around 750 candidates contested the elections, of which 80% were standing for the first time. All candidates had to adhere to three basic principles: "faith in Iran's constitution, loyalty to the monarchical regime, and fidelity to the 'white revolution'." Mainly the rules were to follow a set of non-exploitation laws.

However, the Rastakhiz Party, like others before it, lacked a popular base. Even though the candidates adhered to the philosophy of the rule by the monarchy, there were sometimes three or four candidates for the same seats as the party slated multiple. However, Communists were banned from running for office.

== Electoral system ==
Members of the Majlis were elected using the multiple non-transferable vote system. Tehran was allocated twenty-seven seats, Tabriz nine, Shiraz seven, Isfahan five and Ahwaz, Abadan, Babol, Rasht, Rezaieh, Karaj, and Kermanshah three. Of the remaining seats, twenty-five were allocated in two-member districts, and 139 in single-member districts.

== Results ==
=== Majlis ===
| Party | Votes | % | Seats | +/– |
|---|---|---|---|---|
| Rastakhiz Party | | 100 | 268 | New |
| Invalid/blank votes | | – | – | – |
| Total | 6,805,651 | 100 | 268 | 0 |
Source: Nohlen et al., IPU

=== Senate ===
| Party | Votes | % | Seats | +/– |
|---|---|---|---|---|
| Rastakhiz Party | | 100 | 30 | New |
| Appointed seats | —N/a | – | 30 | 0 |
| Invalid/blank votes | | – | – | – |
| Total | | | 60 | 0 |
Source: IPU
