= 1967 Iranian general election =

- 4 August 1967

All 219 seats in the National Consultative Assembly 30 out of 60 seats in the Senate of Iran
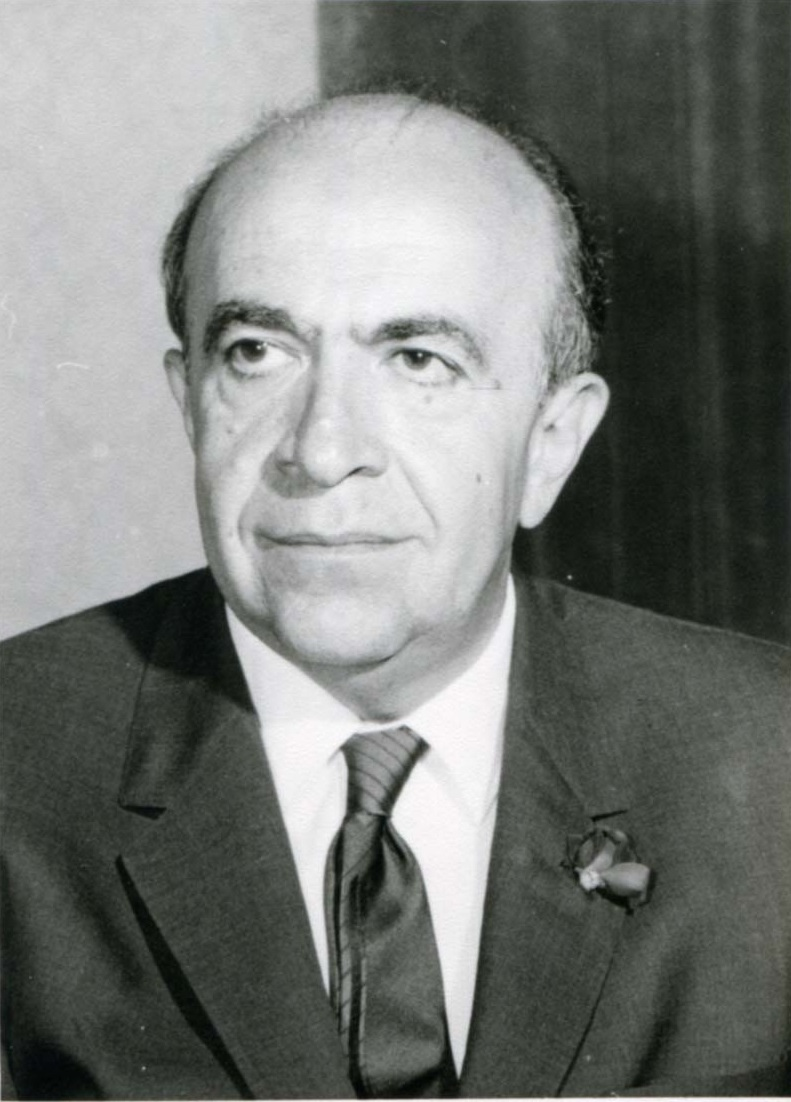

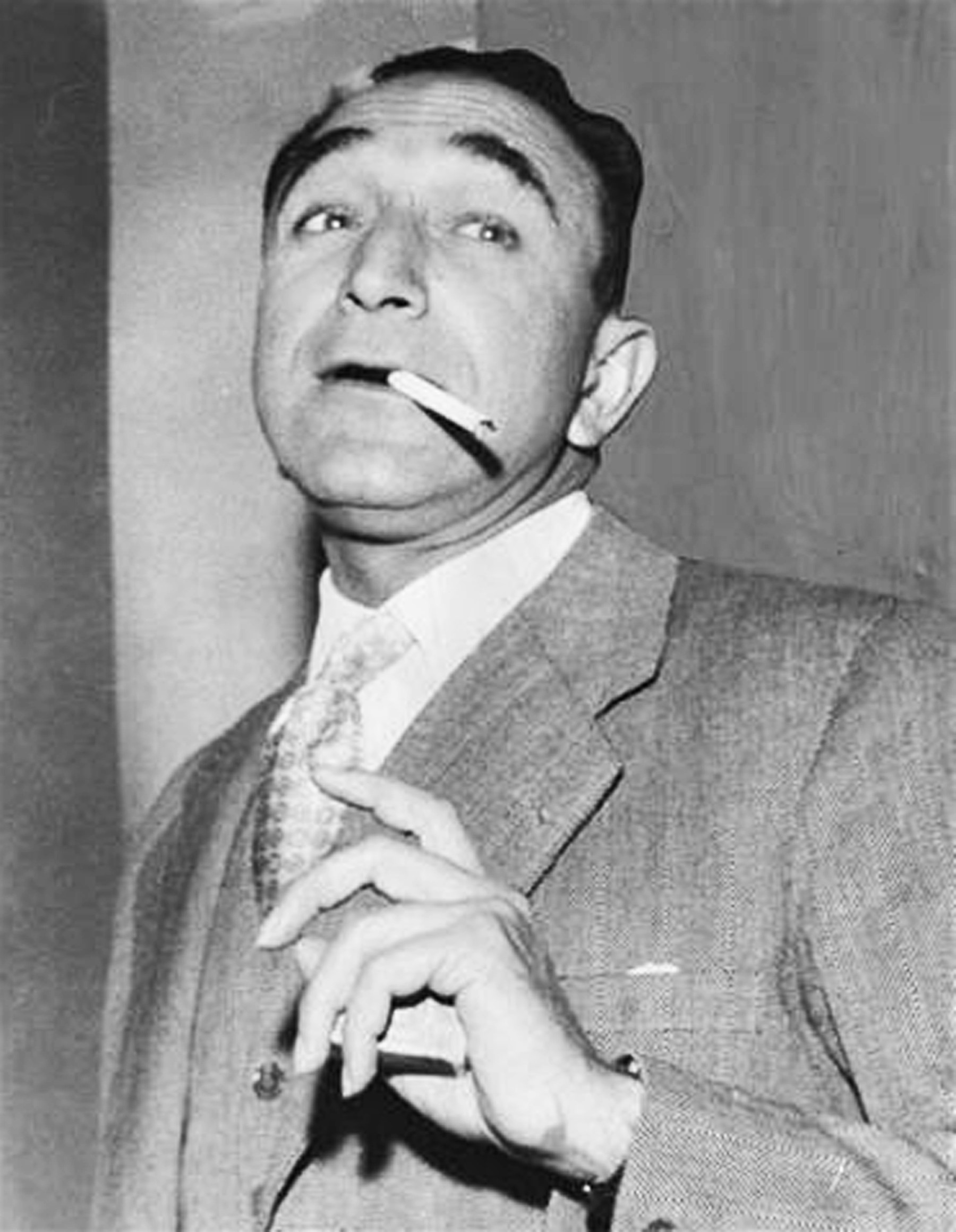

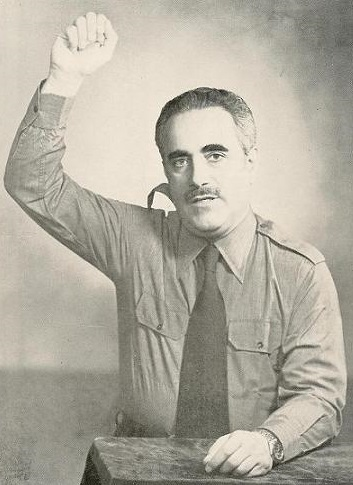
	First party	Second party	Third party
Leader	Amir-Abbas Hoveyda	Asadollah Alam	Mohsen Pezeshkpour
Party	Iran Novin	People's	Pan-Iranist Party
Majlis seats	180	31	5
Seat change	▲40	▲15	▲5
Senate seats	26	4	0
- Composition of the Senate of Iran following the election. Royally appointed seats are shown in gray.

- Composition of the Assembly of Iran following the election
Prime Minister before election
Amir-Abbas Hoveyda
New Iran Party
Elected Prime Minister
Amir-Abbas Hoveyda
New Iran Party

Parliamentary elections were held in Iran on 4 August 1967. The result was a victory for the Iran Novin Party, which won 180 of the 219 seats in the Majlis. Voter turnout was around 35%.

Simultaneous elections were also held for a Constitutional Assembly in order for amendments to be made to the constitution to designate a regent, as well as an election for Senate.

== Results ==
=== Majlis ===
Party	Votes	%	Seats	+/–
Iran Novin Party			180	+40
People's Party			31	+15
Pan-Iranist Party			5	+5
Independents			3	–41
Invalid/blank votes		–	–	–
Total			219	+19
Source: Nohlen et al.

=== Senate ===
Party	Votes	%	Seats
Iran Novin Party			26
People's Party			4
Pan-Iranist Party			0
Independents			0
Appointed seats	—N/a	—N/a	30
Invalid/blank votes		–	–
Total			60
Source: IPU

=== Constitutional Assembly ===
Party	Votes	%	Seats
Iran Novin Party			232
People's Party			30
Pan-Iranist Party			5
Independents			6
Invalid/blank votes		–	–
Total			273
Source: IPU
