= 1963 Iranian general election =

1963 Iranian legislative election
- 17 September 1963

All 200 seats to the National Consultative Assembly
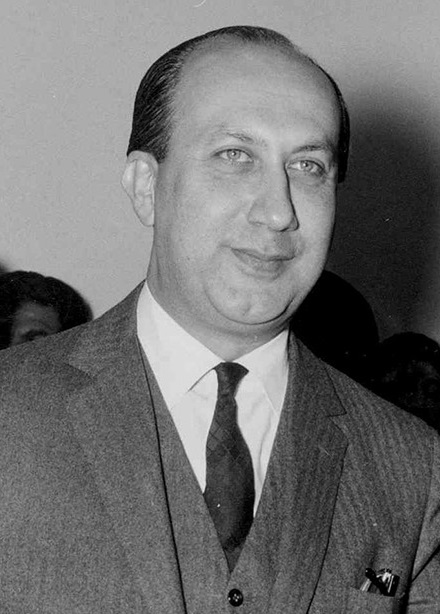

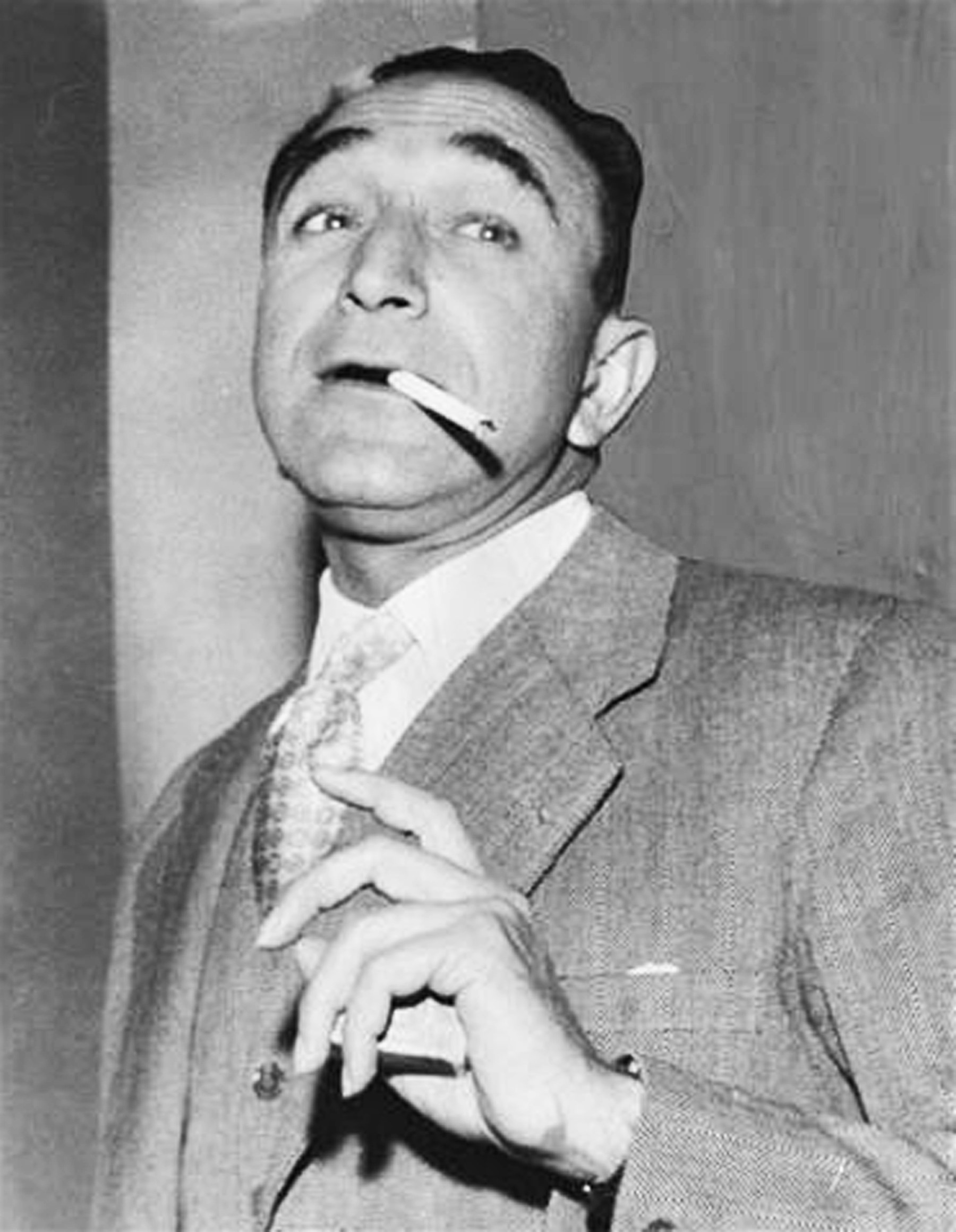
	First party	Second party
Leader	Hassan Ali Mansur	Asadollah Alam
Party	Iran Novin	People's
Seats won	140	16
Seat change	▲140	▼49
- Composition of the Assembly following the election
Prime Minister before election
Asadollah Alam
People's Party
Elected Prime Minister
Hassan Ali Mansur
New Iran Party

Parliamentary elections were held in Iran on 17 September 1963. The result was a victory for the New Iran Party, which won 140 of the 200 seats. Voter turnout was 91.7%.

It was held a few months after the 'White Revolution referendum' and the subsequent demonstrations in June.

Before the elections, opposition figures such as the National Front and the Freedom Movement activists were jailed and no genuine opposition candidates were permitted in the elections. The National Front had requested Prime Minister Asadollah Alam to hold the elections free, but the request was rebuffed. The elections were "rigged and far from a legitimate process".

== Results ==
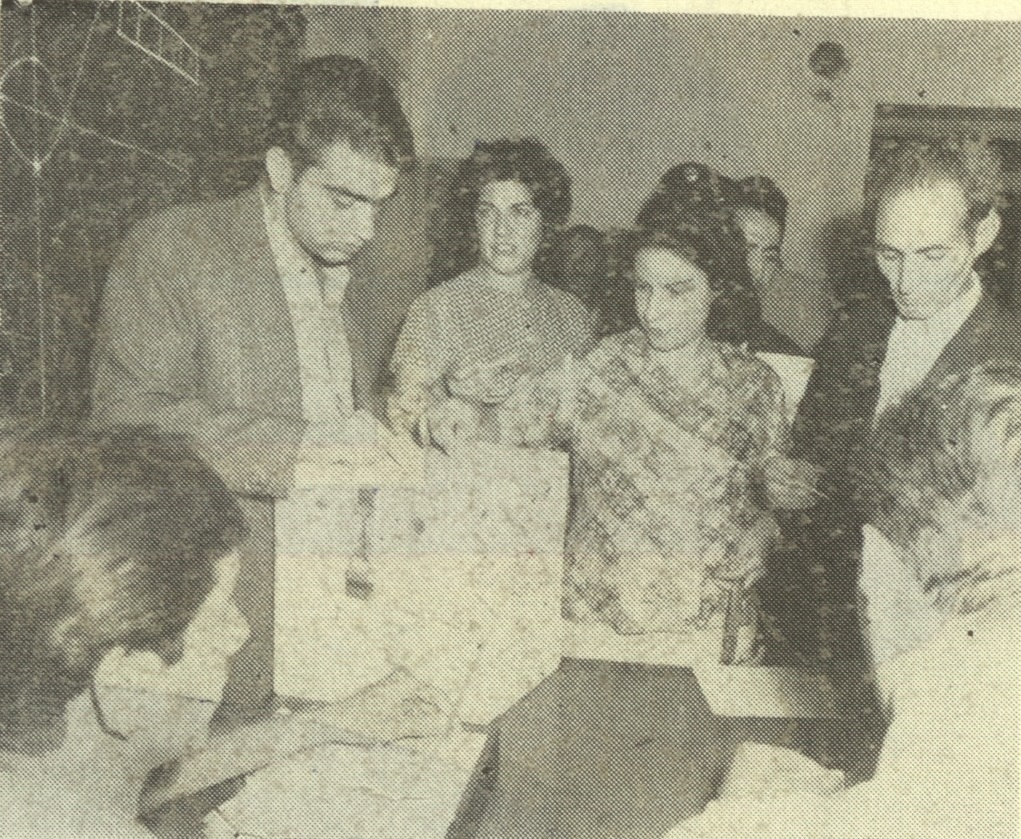
People casting their vote

Party	Votes	%	Seats	+/–
Iran Novin Party			140	New
People's Party			16	–49
Independents			44	+12
Invalid/blank votes		–	–	–
Total	5,593,826		200	0
Source: Nohlen et al.
