= Iran Novin Party =

1964–1975 ruling party of Iran

New Iran Party حزب ایران نوین
- Founder: Hassan Ali Mansour
- Founded: 15 December 1963
- Dissolved: 2 March 1975
- Preceded by: Nationalists' Party
- Merged into: Rastakhiz Party
- Succeeded by: Iran-Novin Party (unofficial successor)
- Worker wing: Worker House (1967–75)
- Ideology: Pahlavi royalism National conservatism
- Political position: Right-wing

The Iran Novin Party (Persian: حزب ایران نوین, romanized: Ḥezb-e Īrān-e Novīn, lit. 'New Iran Party') was a royalist political party in Iran and the country's ruling party for more than a decade, controlling both cabinet and the parliament from 1964 to 1975. The People's Party was regarded as its main opposition.

The party was "indistinguishable from the state", i.e. a party of power, with no coherent ideology or agenda. It was the main reason to deny opportunities to seek a popular following through nationalist or socialist appeals, although its pragmatism and opportunism were advantageous in recruiting.

It comprised technocrats and former civil servants; supported the Court (probably having been initiated by it), identifying with the policies of the Shah and self-proclaimed its role as "guardian" of the White Revolution (Pāsdār-e Enqelāb). This party was active from 1963 to 1975. In 1975, the Shah ordered the dissolution of all parties. According to the order of Mohammad Reza Shah, all parties should be merged into a single party called Rastakhiz Party. Shortly after the 1979 revolution, Mohammad Reza Shah wrote in his book Answer to History that the dissolution of parties was a wrong move. Hassan Ali Mansour and Amir-Abbas Hoveyda were two of the most famous leaders of this party.

== Electoral history ==
=== Legislature ===
Election	Party leader	Parliament			Senate		
Election	Party leader	Seats	+/−	Pos	Seats	+/−	Pos
1963	Hassan Ali Mansur	140 / 200	Steady	1st	Unknown	Steady	1st
1967	Amir-Abbas Hoveyda	180 / 219	▲40	1st	26 / 30	Unknown	1st
1971	Amir-Abbas Hoveyda	230 / 268	▲50	1st	28 / 30	▲2	1st

=== Local councils ===
Election	Seats	Pos
1968	806 / 1,068	1st
1970	838 / 943	1st
1972	3,246 / 3,786	1st

== Leadership ==
Secretaries-General
Name	Tenure	Ref
Hassan Ali Mansur	1963–1965	
Ataollah Khosravani	1965–1969	
Manouchehr Kalali	1969–1974	
Amir-Abbas Hoveyda	1974–1975	

Ruling party of Iran
Preceded by Nationalists’ Party	Iran Novin Party; 1963–1975	Succeeded by Resurgence Party
