= People's Party (Iran) =

1957–1975 political party in Iran

People's Party حزب مردم
- Leader: Asadollah Alam
- Founded: 16 May 1957
- Dissolved: 2 March 1975
- Merged into: Rastakhiz Party
- Ideology: Pahlavi royalism Liberalism (Iranian)
- Political position: Centre-right

People's Party (Persian: حزب مردم, romanized: Ḥezb-e Mardom) was a liberal political party in Pahlavi-era Iran. It was one of two major parties in the apparent attempt to decree a two-party system by Mohammad Reza Pahlavi, apparently in opposition to the ruling New Iran Party and previously the Nationalists' Party. The party was dissolved in 1975, in order to be merged into the newly founded Rastakhiz Party, the only legal party in the Shah's attempted single-party system.

== Leadership ==
Secretaries-General
Name	Tenure	Ref
Asadollah Alam	1957–1960	
Yahya Adl	1960–1971	
Alinaghi Kani	1971–1972	
Yahya Adl	1972–1973	
Nasser Ameri	1973–1975	
Mohammad Fazaeli	1975	

== Electoral history ==
Parliament
Year	Seats	+/–	Ref
1956	36 / 136(26%)	—N/a	
~~1960~~	25 / 200(13%)	—N/a	
1961	65 / 200(33%)	▲29	
1963	16 / 200(8%)	▼49	
1967	31 / 219(14%)	▲15	
1971	37 / 268(14%)	▲6	

Senate (elective seats)
Year	Seats	+/–	Ref
1960	Unknown	—N/a	
1963	Unknown	—N/a	
1967	4 / 30(13%)		
1971	2 / 30(7%)	▼2	

== Reception ==
The party was often criticized for its "lethargic, belated and disorganized" election campaigns, as well as being incapable of preparing a viable alternative to the New Iran Party's platform, thus blamed for the latter's continuing domination of the political scene.

American diplomat Andrew Killgore described the party as "made up of cliques of followers of a few competing leaders who cooperate with one another for personal and pragmatic reasons but not out of any sense of party unity", what he calls a "traditional Iranian political party".

=== In popular culture ===
According to Ervand Abrahamian, People's Party and New Iran Party were interchangeably called "Yes Sir, Party" (Persian: حزب بله‌قربان) and "Yes of Course Sir, Party" (Persian: حزب چشم‌قربان) by people, as members of the two parties in the National Consultative Assembly were assigned to their affiliation by the Shah and with the help of SAVAK.
