= List of Iranian two-star generals since 1979 =

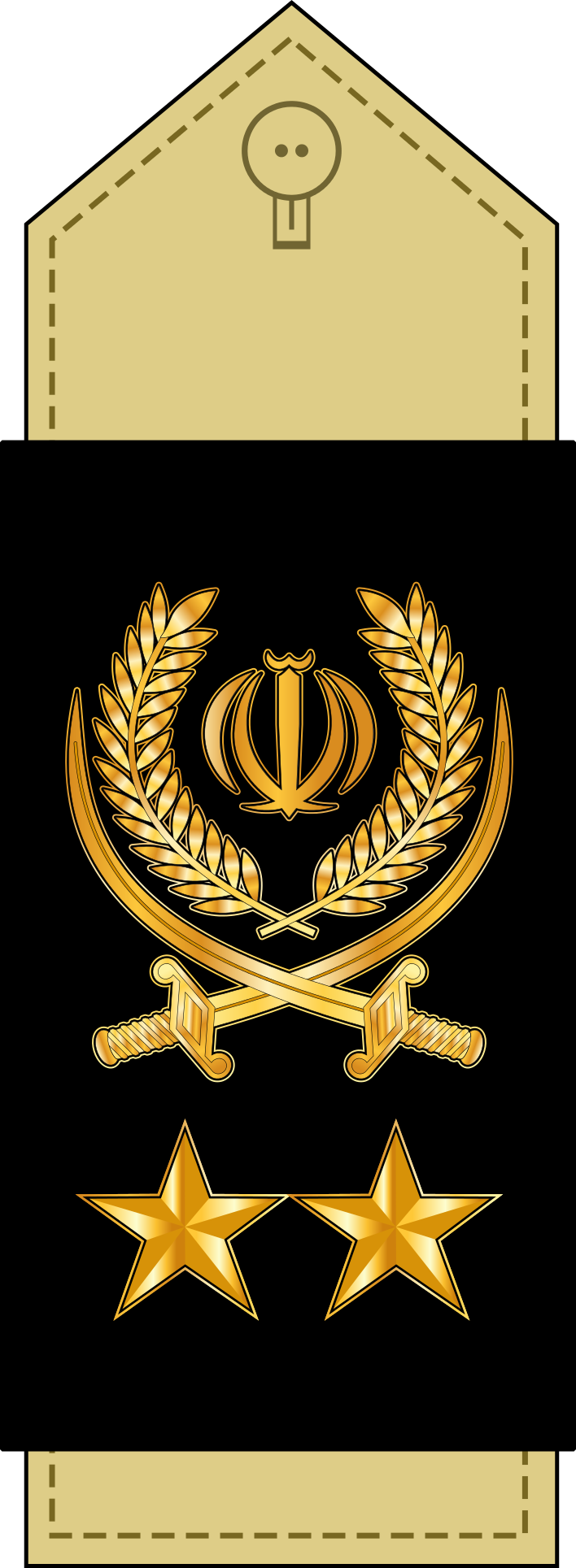
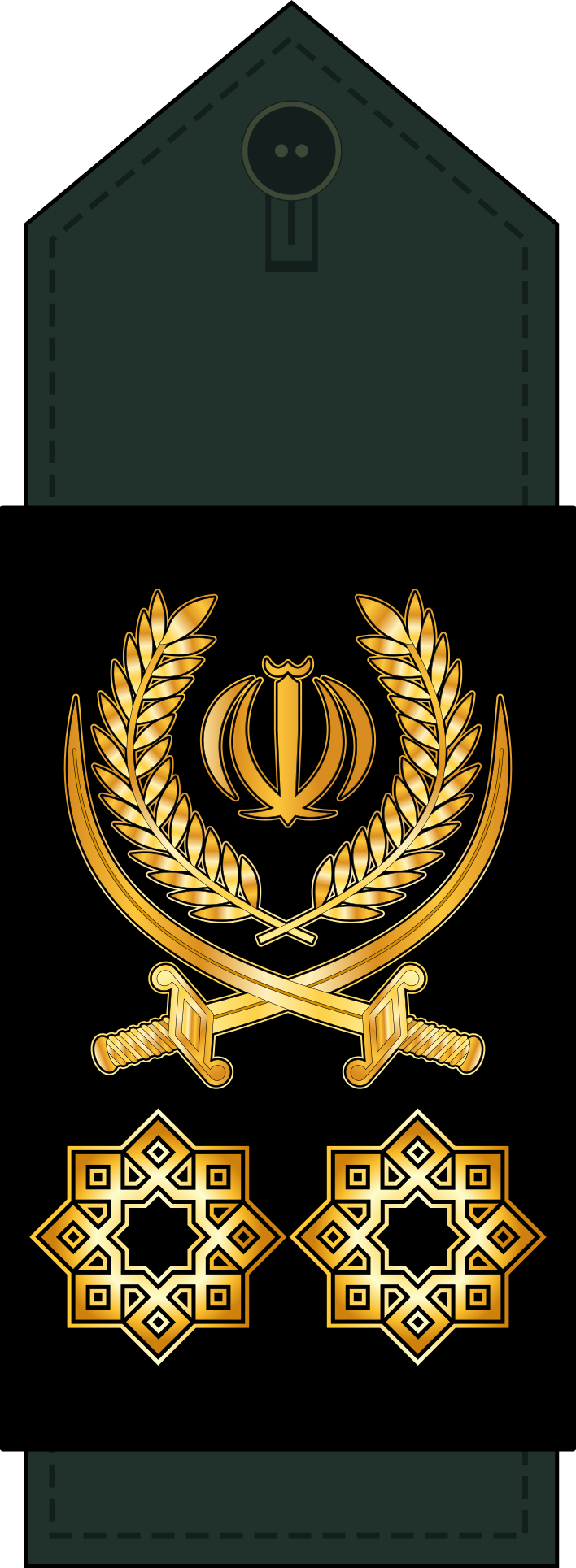
Rank insignia of two-star officers in the IRIA (left) and the IRGC (right)

There are currently 4 two-star officers in the Islamic Republic of Iran Armed Forces: three with the Islamic Revolutionary Guard Corps background and one in the regular army (Artesh).

Although the ranks of General (Arteshbod), Lieutenant General (sepahbod), Admiral (Daryabod) and Vice Admiral (Daryasalar) exist in Iran by the book, the highest military rank practically available to active duty personnel of the Iranian Armed Forces since the Iranian Revolution had been the two-star ranks of Major General (sarlashgar) and Rear Admiral (daryaban).

While Islamic Revolutionary Guard Corps did not use military ranks until 1991, the Islamic Republic of Iran Army was mainly headed by mere colonels until the first post-revolutionary promotion ceremony of its personnel to general ranks in May 1987, in which Qasem-Ali Zahirnejad was the only one promoted to two-star rank. No two-star general has ever served in the Police Command of the Islamic Republic of Iran.

== Current two-star generals ==
No.	Portrait	Name	Service	Branch	Date of rank	Position	Yrs.	CY
Active duty officeholders
1		Mostafa Izadi	IRGC	Ground Force	2008	Deputy Commander of the Islamic Revolutionary Guard Corps (2026–present); Commander Cyber and New Threats Headquarters of the Khatam al-Anbiya Central Headquarters (2016–present); Strategic Deputy Chief of the Armed Forces General Staff (2010–present)	18	29
2		Amir Hatami	IRIA	Ground Force	13 June 2025	Commander-in-Chief of the Islamic Republic of Iran Army (2025–present)	1	41
3		Ali Abdollahi	IRGC	Ground Force	25 June 2025	Commander of the Khatam al-Anbiya Central Headquarters (2025–present); Chief of the General Staff of the Islamic Republic of Iran Armed Forces (2026–present)	1	46
4		Ahmad Vahidi	IRGC	Quds Force	10 August 2026	Commander of the Islamic Revolutionary Guard Corps (2026–present)	0	47
Advisor-level generals
1		Ali Shahbazi	IRIA	Ground Force	18 February 1991	Chief of the Joint Staff/Commander-in-chief of the Islamic Republic of Iran Army (1988–2000); Head of the Military Advisers Group to the Commander-in-Chief of the Armed Forces (2000–present)	9	31
2		Mohsen Rezaei	IRGC	—N/a	18 February 1991	Commander of the Islamic Revolutionary Guard Corps (1981–1997); Secretary of the Supreme National Security Council (2026–present)	6	11
3		Yahya Rahim Safavi	IRGC	Ground Force	10 September 1997	Commander of the Islamic Revolutionary Guard Corps (1997–2007); Senior Military Assistant and Adviser to the Commander-in-Chief of the Armed Forces (2007–present); President of the Research Institute of Sacred Defense Sciences and Studies (2019–present)	10	18
4		Mohammad Ali Jafari	IRGC	Ground Force	3 September 2007	Commander of the Islamic Revolutionary Guard Corps (2007–2019); Commander of the Baqiatallah Cultural and Social Headquarters (2019–present)	19	27
5		Ataollah Salehi	IRIA	Ground Force	Unknown	Commander-in-chief of the Islamic Republic of Iran Army (2005–2017); Deputy Chief of the General Staff of the Armed Forces (2017–2019); Adviser to the Commander-in-Chief of the Armed Forces on Army Affairs (2019–present)	Unknown	
6		Hossein Hassani Sa'di	IRIA	Ground Force	Unknown	Deputy Coordinator of the Armed Forces General Staff (1999–2016); Deputy Commander of the Khatam al-Anbiya HQ (2016–2025)	Unknown	

== Deceased two-star generals ==
No.	Portrait	Name	Service	Branch	Date of rank	Position	Date of death	Posthumous rank
1		Mohammad-Hossein Shaker	IRIA	Ground Force	21 July 1979	Chief of the Joint Staft (1979)	Unknown	
2		Mohammad-Hadi Shadmehr	IRIA	Ground Force	22 December 1979	Chief of the Joint Staft (1979–1980)	11 December 2008	
3		Qasem-Ali Zahirnejad	IRIA	Ground Force	28 April 1987	Head of the Military Advisory Group to the Commander-in-Chief of the Armed Forces (1989–1999)	13 October 1999 (Stroke)	
4		Hassan Firouzabadi	—N/a		17 April 1995	Chief of the Armed Forces General Staff (1989–2016)	3 September 2021 (COVID-19)	
5		Ali Sayad Shirazi	IRIA	Ground Force	5 April 1999	Deputy Chief of the Armed Forces General Staff (1993–1999)	10 April 1999 (Assassinated by MEK)	Lieutenant General
6		Ali Shamkhani	IRIA; IRGC	Naval Forces	18 April 1999	Secretary of the Supreme National Security Council (2013–2023); Minister of Defence and Armed Forces Logistics (1997–2005)	28 February 2026 (Assassinated by joint Israel-US strikes)	Vice Admiral
7		Gholam Ali Rashid	IRGC	Ground Force	18 April 1999	Commander of Khatam al-Anbiya Central Headquarters (2016–2025); Deputy Commander of Khatam al-Anbiya Central Headquarters (?–2016); Deputy Chief of the Armed Forces General Staff (1999–2016)	13 June 2025 (Assassinated by Israel)	Lieutenant General
8		Mohammad Salimi	IRIA	Ground Force	21 May 2000	Adviser to the Commander-in-Chief of the Armed Forces on Army Affairs (2005–2016); Commander of the Khatam al-Anbia Air Defense Headquarters (2000–2005); Commander-in-chief of the Islamic Republic of Iran Army (2000–2005)	30 January 2016 (Unknown)	
9		Mohammad Bagheri	IRGC	Ground Force	2008	Chief of the Armed Forces General Staff (2016–2025); Deputy for Joint Affairs and Structures of the General Staff (2014–2016); Deputy for Intelligence and Operations of the General Staff (2002–2014); Deputy Coordinator of the Khatam al-Anbiya Central Headquarters (2007–2016)	13 June 2025 (Assassinated by Israel)	Lieutenant General
10		Qasem Soleimani	IRGC	Quds Force	24 January 2011	Commander of the Quds Force (1998–2020)	3 January 2020 (Assassinated by U.S.A)	Lieutenant General
11		Abdolrahim Mousavi	IRIA	Ground Force	21 August 2017	Commander-in-chief of the Islamic Republic of Iran Army (2017–2025); Chief of the Armed Forces General Staff (2025–2026)	28 February 2026 (Assassinated by joint Israel-US strikes)	Lieutenant General
12		Hossein Salami	IRGC	Aerospace Force	21 April 2019	Commander-in-chief of the Islamic Revolutionary Guard Corps (2019–2025)	13 June 2025 (Assassinated by Israel)	Lieutenant General
13		Mohammad Pakpour	IRGC	Ground Force	13 June 2025	Commander of the Islamic Revolutionary Guard Corps (2025–2026)	28 February 2026 (Assassinated by joint Israel-US strikes)	Lieutenant General
14		Ali Shadmani	IRGC	Ground Force	13 June 2025	Commander of Khatam al-Anbiya Central Headquarters (2025)	17 June 2025 (Assassinated by Israel)	Lieutenant General

== two-star generals in Service before the Revolution ==
No.	Portrait	Name	Service	Branch	Date of rank	Position	Date of death	Posthumous rank
1		Mohammad-Vali Gharani	IIAF	Ground Force	October 1958	Chief of the Joint Staff (1979)	23 April 1979 (Assassinated by Forqan Group)	Lieutenant General
2		Nasser Farbod	IIAF	Ground Force	1 February 1975	Chief of the Joint Staff (1979)	26 April 2019 (Unknown)	
3		Amir-Bahman Bagheri	IIAF	Air Force	Unknown	Commander of the Air Force (1979–1980)	2010 (Unknown)	
