= Houshang Hatem =

Iranian General (1918–1980)

Timsar Houshang Hatem
- هوشنگ حاتم

Deputy Chief of the Joint Staff
- In office 6 March 1978 – 20 February 1979
- Monarch: Mohammad Reza Pahlavi
- Prime Minister: Jamshid Amouzegar; Jafar Sharif-Emami; Gholam Reza Azhari; Shapour Bakhtiar; Mehdi Bazargan
- Supreme Leader: Ruhollah Khomeini
- Preceded by: Jafar Shafaghat
- Succeeded by: Mohammad-Hadi Shadmehr

Personal details
- Born: 1918 Rasht, Qajar Iran
- Died: 14 August 1980 (aged 61–62) Tehran, Iran
- Education: University of Tehran; University of War

Military service
- Allegiance: Pahlavi Iran (1938–1979); Iran (1979)
- Branch/service: Ground Forces
- Years of service: 1938–1979
- Rank: Lieutenant General
- Commands: Commander of the Shiraz Corps (1972–1974); Commander of the Isfahan Artillery Training Center (1966–1969); Artillery Commander of the 1st Guard Division (1966)

Houshang Hatem (Persian: هوشنگ حاتم; 1918 – 1980) as Iranian general and Deputy Chief of Staff of Imperial Army of Iran.

== Early life and education ==
General Hatem Born in Rasht in 1918 he graduated from University of War

== his position ==
Hatem began his service with the rank of second artillery lieutenant in the army and in 1955, after obtaining the rank of second colonel

During his service, he was appointed to positions such as: Artillery Commander of the 1st Guard Division, Commander of the Isfahan Artillery Training Center, Commander of the Shiraz Corps, and Deputy Commander of the Army Headquarters in 1978.

Houshang Hatem, the deputy commander-in-chief, called on the army to issue a neutral statement at the last meeting of the headquarters, stating the issue of the Shah's departure and his non-return, and Ayatollah Khomeini announcing the republic and Bakhtiar's intention to change the system of government to a republic

Hossein Fardoust introduces Houshang Hatem, the author of the Army Neutrality Statement.

Houshang Nahavandi, the former president of the University of Tehran, claims that Hatem, as the sponsor and successor of the General Staff of the Army, wanted to deal severely with the opposition, which was not approved by the Shah.

After the victory of the Revolution of 1979, General Hatem worked with Mohammad-Vali Gharani as the Deputy Chief of Staff of the National Army. He retired after a while and retired on March 22, 1979 He was transferred to Qasr Prison. He was initially sentenced to three years in prison, and was later sentenced to death by a lower court artillery officer from the 1st Division Artillery. He was executed in 1980.
