= Abbas Gharabaghi =

Iranian military official (1918–2000)

Timsar Abbas Gharabaghi
- عباس قره‌باغی
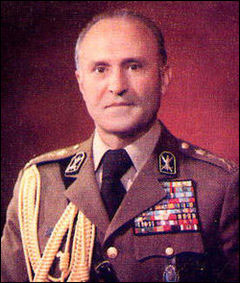
- General Gharabaghi, c. 1970s

Member of Regency Council
- In office 13 January 1979 – 22 January 1979
- Appointed by: Mohammad Reza Pahlavi

Chief of the Joint Staff
- In office 22 December 1978 – 11 February 1979
- Prime Minister: Gholam Reza Azhari; Shapour Bakhtiar
- Deputy: Houshang Hatem
- Preceded by: Gholam Reza Azhari
- Succeeded by: Mohammad-Vali Gharani

Minister of Interior
- In office 28 August 1978 – 6 January 1979
- Prime Minister: Jafar Sharif-Emami; Gholam Reza Azhari
- Preceded by: Asadollah Nasr Esfahani
- Succeeded by: Shapour Bakhtiar

Minister of Finance
- Acting; 6 November 1978 – 22 November 1978
- Monarch: Mohammad Reza Pahlavi
- Prime Minister: Gholam Reza Azhari
- Preceded by: Mohammad Yeganeh
- Succeeded by: Hassan Ali Mehran

Commander of the Iranian Gendarmerie
- In office 3 May 1974 – 26 August 1978
- Monarch: Mohammad Reza Pahlavi
- Prime Minister: Amir-Abbas Hoveyda; Jamshid Amouzegar; Jafar Sharif-Emami
- Preceded by: Fereydoun Farrokhnia
- Succeeded by: Ahmadali Mohagheghi

Deputy Commander of the Ground Forces
- In office 1972–1973
- Monarch: Mohammad Reza Pahlavi
- Prime Minister: Amir-Abbas Hoveyda
- Preceded by: ?
- Succeeded by: Khodamrad Siyoushans

Chief of Staff of the Ground Forces
- In office 1968–1972
- Monarch: Mohammad Reza Pahlavi
- Prime Minister: Amir-Abbas Hoveyda
- Preceded by: ?
- Succeeded by: ?

Commandant of the War College
- In office 1962–1964
- Monarch: Mohammad Reza Pahlavi
- Prime Minister: Asadollah Alam
- Preceded by: ?
- Succeeded by: ?

Personal details
- Born: Abbas Karim Gharabaghi; 9 February 1918 Tabriz, Qajar Iran
- Died: 13 October 2000 (aged 82) Paris, France
- Education: Madrasa Nezam; Officers' School; University of Tehran; War University; University of Tehran; École de guerre - Terre; University of Paris

Military service
- Allegiance: Pahlavi Iran
- Branch/service: Imperial Iranian Ground Forces
- Years of service: 1936–1979
- Rank: General
- Unit: 22nd Infantry Regiment (Mounted)
- Commands: Western Corps in Kermanshah (1973–1974); 1st Imperial Guards Division (1965–1968); Gorgan Infantry Division (1964–1965); Immortal Guards (1942–1946)
- Battles/wars: World War II; Anglo-Soviet invasion of Iran; Iran crisis of 1946; Joint Operation Arvand; Siahkal incident; Seizure of Abu Musa and the Greater and Lesser Tunbs; Dhofar rebellion; Iranian Revolution

Abbas Karim Gharabaghi (Persian: عباس کریم قره‌باغی; 9 February 1918 – 13 October 2000) was an Iranian general who was the last chief of the joint staff of the Iranian Armed Forces as well as deputy commander-in-chief of the Iranian Imperial Army under the rule of Mohammad Reza Pahlavi, the last Shah of Iran. Gharabaghi was one of two senior military officials who were not detained and executed by the Islamic Revolutionary Council. With Fardoust, he convinced the army to get a neutral position as he was linked with the Revolutionary and foreign intelligence forces.

== Early life ==
Born in Tabriz, Gharabaghi was of Azerbaijani origin. His father, Mirza Karim Khan, was a merchant whose family had emigrated to Iran following the Russo-Persian Wars and settled in Tabriz.

After completing his primary education, Gharabaghi attended Roshdieh High School, where he studied until the fourth year. He then transferred to the Tabriz Military High School, graduating with a military diploma in 1936 before entering the Officers' Academy.

In October 1936, he enrolled in the Officers' Academy, coinciding with the period when Mohammad Reza Pahlavi was Crown prince. During this time, Gharabaghi was appointed as the Crown Prince's secretary.

=== Military education ===
Gharabaghi was sent to France to complete the advanced infantry officers' course. While there, he also studied at the University of Paris, earning a doctorate in law in 1954.

After returning to Iran, he served in the Operations Department (Third Bureau) of the Army General Staff. In 1955, he returned to France to attend the advanced course at the French War College. During this period, he completed:

- the Ninth General Staff Course at the War College (1956),
- the Joint Services Advanced Course (1960), and
- the Advanced Diploma of the French War College (1961).

=== Career ===
In March 1963, Gharabaghi was appointed Commandant of the War Collage. While holding that position, he was also entrusted in 1963 with:

- command of the Non-Commissioned Officers' Corps of the Iranian Science Corps,
- responsibility for security arrangements during the state visit of the King of Denmark to Iran, and
- responsibility for security arrangements during the visit of the President of India.

That same year, he was appointed President of the Special Military Court of Appeal, which reviewed the convictions of Mahmoud Taleghani, Mehdi Bazargan, Yadollah Sahabi, and several members of the Freedom Movement of Iran. The court ultimately upheld the original convictions.

In August 1964, Gharabaghi was appointed commander of the Gorgan Infantry Division and in September 1965, he was appointed commander of the 1st Guards Division. In October 1968, he became the Chief of Staff of the Ground Forces and held this position until May 1972. He was promoted to the rank of lieutenant general on March 10 of the same year. From May 1972 to October 1973, Gharabaghi was the deputy commander of the Ground Forces, but due to a disagreement between him and General Gholam Ali Oveissi, who was the commander of the Ground Forces at the time, he was dismissed from his position and appointed the commander of the Western Corps in Kermanshah.

He served as the gendarmerie commander until 1978. When the Iranian Revolution broke out in 1978, both Hassan Toufanian and Amir Hossein Rabii planned to carry out a coup to stabilize the turmoil in the country. However, the idea failed as it was not backed by other senior military officials, including Gharabaghi.

Gharabaghi was appointed chief of the joint staff of the Iranian Armed Forces on 7 January 1979. His job entailed defending the monarchy until the Shah left Iran and then supporting the new civilian government led by Shapour Bakhtiar. However, on 11 February 1979, after much strife on the streets of Tehran and elsewhere, Gharabaghi and with twenty-two other senior military leaders withdrew support of Bakhtiar, thus tacitly giving approval to the revolutionary Islamic Republic.

Gharabaghi was then assigned as a prosecutor to the Islamic Revolutionary Court, which ordered the killing of many senior Iranian officials who served under the Shah. However, as a result of tensions in Azerbaijan, in 1979 Gharabaghi's relations with Ayatollah Khomeini became tense and he fled from Tehran. The revolutionary authorities sought him, but did not manage to arrest him.

In December 1979, a report outlined the exiled Shah's belief that the covert meetings earlier in January of that year between U.S. General Robert E. Huyser and Khomeini representative Mehdi Bazargan were organized by Gharabaghi. He further accused Gharabaghi of being a traitor.

=== Works ===
Gharabaghi published his account of the revolution in his books Haghayegh Darbareye Bohran-e Iran ("Facts About the Iran Crisis", 1983), and Che Shod Ke Chonan Shod? (translated as "Why did it happen?", 1999). He argued that his decision to declare the army's "neutrality" was the main reason for the final triumph of the Islamic Revolution.

In his first book, Gharabaghi expresses his strong support for and loyalty to the Shah and paints a detailed picture of the chaos within the military ranks during the final days of the government, placing the blame on Prime Minister Bakhtiar for its collapse. He justifies his decision to declare the army's "neutrality" as the only reasonable solution given the circumstances in order to prevent further bloodshed, calling Bakhtiar a traitor.

== Death ==
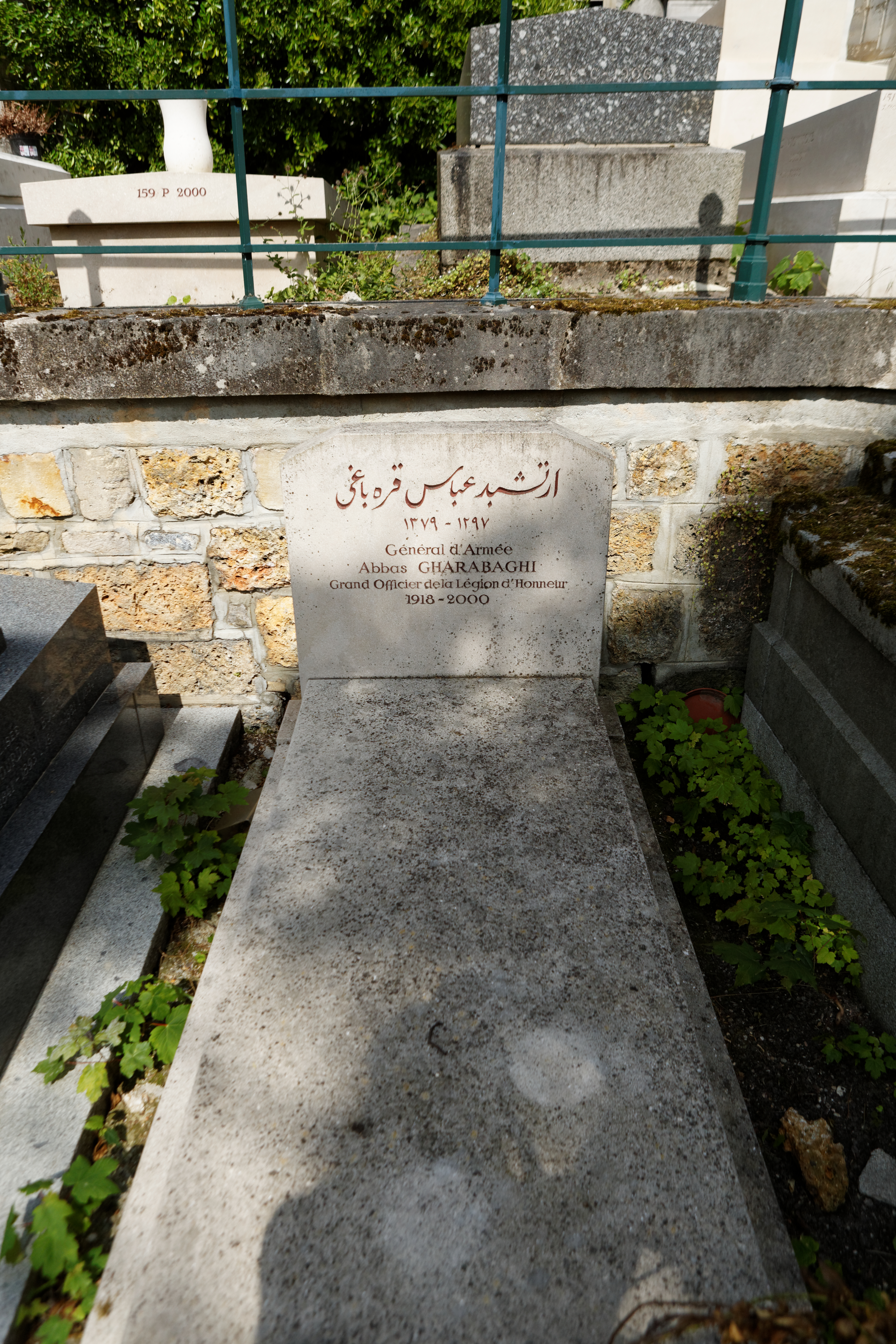
The tomb of Gharabaghi in Père Lachaise Cemetery

Gharabaghi died on October 13, 2000 in Paris. He is buried in the Père Lachaise Cemetery.

Military offices
Preceded by Gholam Reza Azhari	Commandant of the War College; 1962–1964	Succeeded by ?
Preceded by ?	Commander of the 5th Gorgan Infantry Division; 1964–1965	Succeeded by ?
Preceded by Gholam Ali Oveissi	Commander of the 1st Guards Infantry Division; 1965–1968	Succeeded by ?
Preceded by ?	Chief of Staff of the Imperial Iranian Army Ground Forces; 1968–1972	Succeeded by ?
Preceded by ?	Deputy Commander of the Imperial Iranian Army Ground Forces; 1972–1973	Succeeded by Khodamorad Siavashnas
Preceded by Fereydoun Farrokhnia	Commander of the 1st Corps of Kermanshah; 1973–1974	Succeeded by ?
Preceded by Fereydoun Farrokhnia	Commander of the Iranian Gendarmerie; 3 May 1974–26 August 1978	Succeeded by Ahmadali Mohagheghi
Preceded by Gholam Reza Azhari	Chief of the Joint Staff of the Imperial Iranian Armed Forces; 22 December 1978–11 February 1979	Succeeded by Mohammad-Vali Gharani as Chief of the Joint Staff of the Islamic Republic of Iran Army
Political offices
Preceded by Asadollah Nasr Esfahani	Minister of Interior; 28 August 1978–6 January 1979	Succeeded by Shapour Bakhtiar Acting
Preceded by Mohammad Yeganeh	Minister of Economic Affairs and Finance Acting; 6 November 1978–22 November 1978	Succeeded by Hassan Ali Mehran
