= Mohammad-Vali Gharani =

Iranian military officer (1913–1979)

Timsar Seyyed Mohammad-Vali Gharani
- محمدولی قرنی
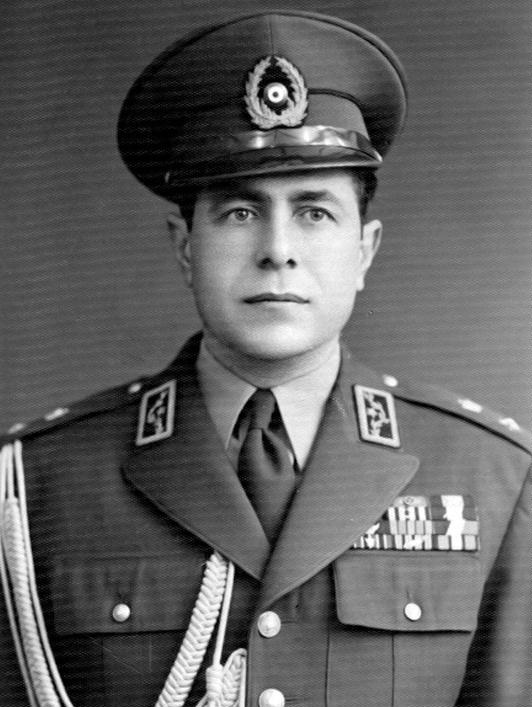
- General Gharani in 1979

Member of the Council of the Islamic Revolution
- In office 12 February 1979 – 23 April 1979

Chief of the Joint Staff
- In office 12 February 1979 – 27 March 1979
- Prime Minister: Mehdi Bazargan
- Supreme Leader: Ruhollah Khomeini
- Preceded by: Abbas Gharabaghi
- Succeeded by: Nasser Farbod

Deputy Chief of the Joint Staff
- In office 1956–1956
- Monarch: Mohammad Reza Pahlavi
- Prime Minister: Hossein Ala'

Director of the Second Bureau
- In office 1954–1956
- Monarch: Mohammad Reza Pahlavi
- Prime Minister: Fazlollah Zahedi; Hossein Ala'
- Preceded by: Mostafa Amjadi
- Succeeded by: Haj Ali Kia

Personal details
- Born: 21 March 1913 Tehran, Qajar Iran
- Died: 23 April 1979 (aged 66) Tehran, Iran
- Cause of death: Assassination
- Resting place: Fatima Masumeh Shrine, Qom
- Education: Officers' Academy; War College

Military service
- Allegiance: Pahlavi Iran; Iran
- Branch/service: Imperial Iranian Ground Forces; Islamic Republic of Iran Ground Forces
- Years of service: 1930–1958; 1979
- Rank: Major General; Major General; Lieutenant General (posthumously)
- Commands: Rasht garrison (1952–1953)
- Battles/wars: 1953 Iranian coup d'état; 1979 Kurdish rebellion; 1979 Turkmen rebellion in Iran
- Criminal information
- Convictions: Disobeying orders, Attempting to overthrow the throne (1958); Undermining national security (1963)
- Penalty: 3 years in prison (1958); 2 years in prison (1963)

Details
- Date apprehended: 1958–1961; 1963–1965

Mohammad-Vali Gharani (Persian: محمدولی قرنی; 21 March 1913 – 23 April 1979) was an Iranian military officer. He was born in Tehran in 1913. He graduated from the Officers' Academy and the War College. In 1950 he rose to the rank of colonel and Then he was appointed to Rasht as a garrison commander.

By August 1953, Gharani was commander of the Rasht Brigade and loyal to the Shah. He met with Ardeshir Zahedi and helped 1953 Iranian coup d'état. Following the coup, he was promoted to vice Chief-of-Staff. In 1957, when SAVAK was established, he reportedly was a candidate to take office as head of the newly established secret service. Gharani however had become increasingly critical of regime due to 'endemic corruption' over the past years, unbeknownst to the authorities. He planned a coup d'état against the regime which was exposed, leading to dishonorable discharge in 1958. He was imprisoned twice in 1958 and 1963.

Gharani served as the first Chief-of-Staff of the Iranian Army after the Iranian Revolution, from 12 February 1979 to 27 March 1979, when he resigned over differences with the interim government cabinet. He was assassinated on 23 April 1979 by the Forqan Group.

== Early life and education ==
Mohammad Valiollah Qarani was born on 21 March 1913 in Tehran to a middle class family. His father, who was a manager in the Tehran Telegraph Administration, died when Qarani was ten years old, after which he and his mother faced difficult financial circumstances.

He completed his primary education at Golbahar Elementary School in Isfahan. A year later, he began his secondary education at Dar al-Fonun in Tehran and graduated from the Army High School.

In 1930, Qarani entered the 10th class of the Army Officers' Academy (then known as the School of Officer Training). He graduated in 1932 with the rank of Second Lieutenant in the artillery branch.

== Military Service and coup plot ==
After graduating from the Army Officers' Academy, Qarani served in two artillery units. In 1945, he was sent to the Army Staff College, after which he was appointed head of the Second Bureau of the Army General Staff (military intelligence). In 1950, he was promoted to the rank of Colonel and appointed commander of the Rasht Garrison.

During the premiership of Mohammad Mosaddegh, Qarani was removed from his post on charges of opposing the prime minister. During the 1953 Iranian coup d'état, he did not play a direct role in the coup. However, following the purge of officers affiliated with the National Front, Qarani—who had previously been dismissed under Mosaddegh—was regarded as a loyal supporter of Mohammad Reza Pahlavi and was rapidly promoted through the ranks.

According to political scientist Mark Gasiorowski, Qarani's political views during the 1950s differed significantly from those of the Shah and many senior military officers. His first serious, though largely concealed, disagreements with the Shah reportedly emerged after he became head of the Second Bureau of the Army General Staff (military intelligence).

In his memoir Karavan-e Omr (The Caravan of Life), Esfandiar Bozorgmehr wrote that, while serving as head of the Second Bureau, Qarani repeatedly submitted reports to the Shah detailing corruption among members of the royal court and other influential figures, but received negative reactions to his reports.

By the mid-1950s, Qarani was serving as chief of the Second Bureau of the Army General Staff. During this period, he established a semi-clandestine organization through a group known as the "Brothers", working with several influential figures, including the Imam Jom'eh of Tehran, Abbas Massoudi, publisher of the newspaper Ettela'at, and Hasan Arsanjani, whose political views were reportedly close to his own.

Arsanjani also sought to establish a democratic political party whose members allegedly held covert anti-Shah views. According to some accounts, Qarani personally obtained the Shah's permission to establish the party. He also reportedly organized a network of approximately seventy military officers, mostly junior officers serving in battalions, with the knowledge of an American liaison. At the same time, Qarani is said to have informed the Shah that these activities were intended to identify and arrest anti-Shah elements within the armed forces, leading the Shah to disregard reports submitted by SAVAK. SAVAK repeatedly warned the Shah of Qarani's contacts with religious clerics, his organization of a clandestine network, and what it described as his authoritarian tendencies.

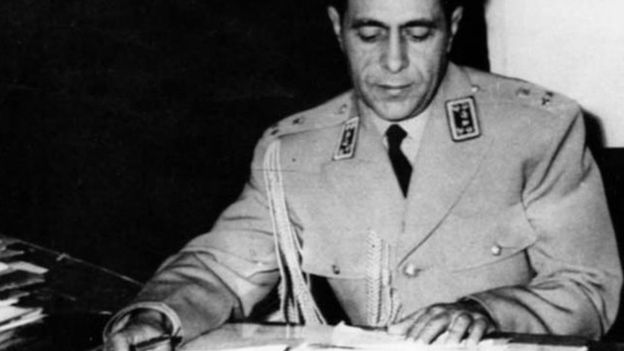
Gharani in the 1950s.

In early March 1958, Esfandiar Bozorgmehr traveled through Beirut to Athens, where he met William M. Rountree, the United States Assistant Secretary of State for Near Eastern, South Asian, and African Affairs. Upon returning to Tehran, Bozorgmehr was arrested and interrogated by SAVAK. After receiving reports on Bozorgmehr's activities and the discovery of a sixty-page letter in which Qarani criticized corruption within the government, Mohammad Reza Pahlavi reportedly ordered SAVAK to take action against him.

Qarani was arrested on 9 March 1958. Shortly after his arrest, newspapers reported that he had allegedly conspired with a foreign power against the Shah. Soon afterward, a forged document, presented as a letter from members of the United States Senate declaring their full confidence in the Shah, was published in the press.

Despite the serious accusations brought against him, and although the Army Prosecutor, Lieutenant General Amir Hossein Azmoudeh, described his actions as more dangerous than the Tudeh Party Military Organization conspiracy, Qarani was sentenced only to three years' imprisonment and dismissed from the army. He received a royal pardon in January 1961 and was released from prison.

== Exposure of the coup plot ==
Accounts differ regarding how Qarani's alleged coup plot was uncovered. Some sources attribute its exposure to rival senior military officers, including Lieutenant General Teymur Bakhtiar, Lieutenant General Haj Ali Kia, and Lieutenant General Mehdi Qoli Alavi Moghadam, who were engaged in intense professional rivalries with Qarani.

Other accounts suggest that American intelligence disclosed the plot to demonstrate goodwill toward the Shah, while another interpretation attributes its exposure to British or Soviet intelligence services seeking to prevent a coup supported by the United States. Published American sources acknowledge that U.S. officials were aware of the plot but deny that the United States revealed it.

One interpretation argues that the United States may have viewed the alleged coup as a means of convincing the Shah that a powerful domestic opposition existed, thereby encouraging him to undertake reforms intended to preserve the Pahlavi monarchy and prevent the emergence of either a neutral or pro-Soviet government in Iran.

Following the exposure of the coup, Qarani was sentenced to three years' imprisonment. Former Diplomat and Intelligence officer Mansour Ghadr later argued that Qarani's actions stemmed not from ideological convictions but from personal ambition, claiming that his opposition to the Shah emerged after he had been removed from office.

After his release, Qarani reportedly lost confidence in the United States and established closer ties with religious-nationalist figures, including Mahmoud Taleghani, the Freedom Movement of Iran, and Seyyed Mohammad Hadi al-Milani. These contacts led to his arrest once again. He spent approximately nine months in solitary confinement before being sentenced by a military court to another three-year prison term. Following his second release, his financial circumstances reportedly deteriorated significantly, and from that point onward he remained under close surveillance by SAVAK.

== Arrests and imprisonment ==
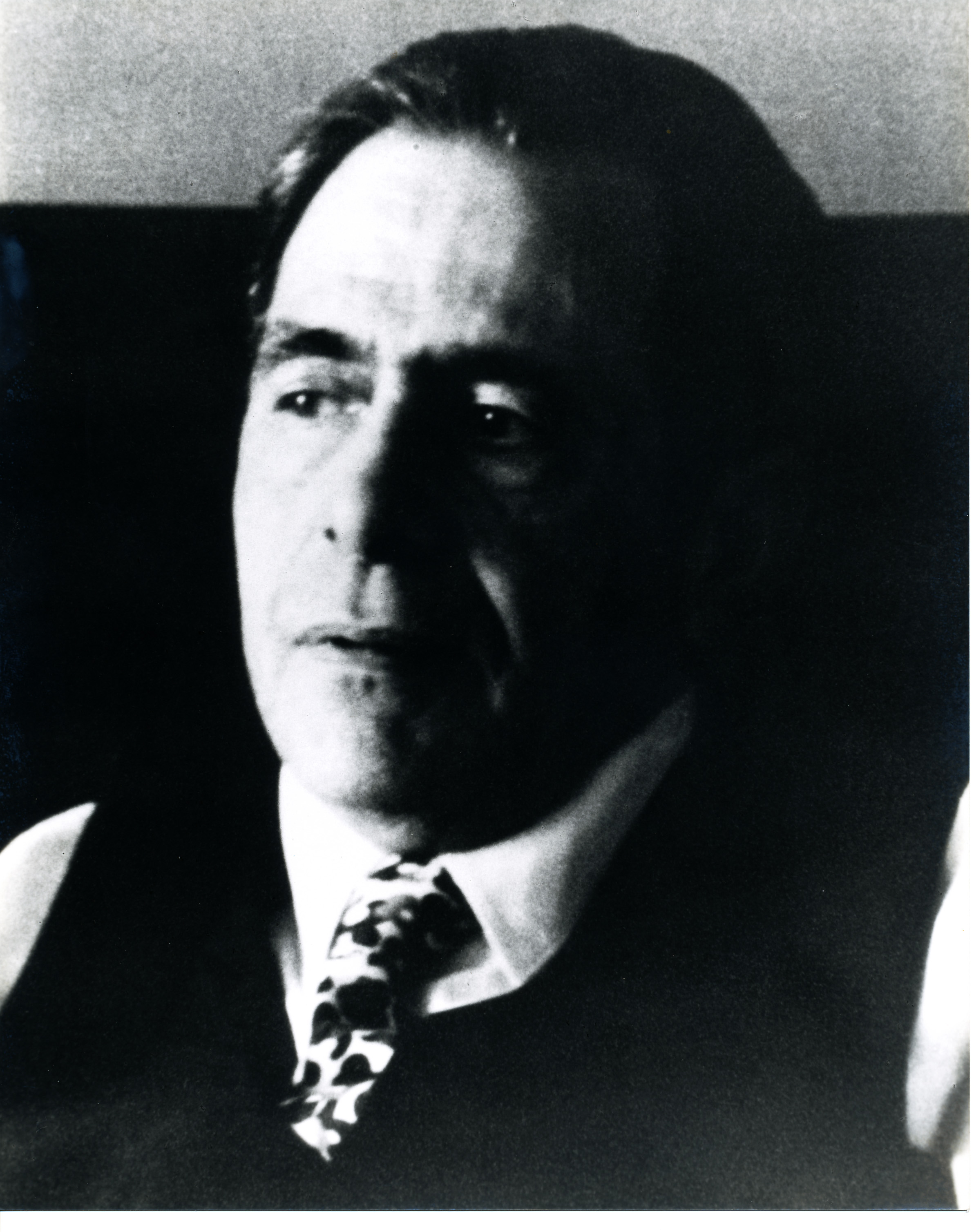
Gharani in an interview

Qarani was arrested twice during the Pahlavi era. The first arrest occurred in late 1958, when he was accused of political interference and involvement with a clandestine organization. The second took place in 1963, after he established contacts with clerics opposed to the Pahlavi government.

While imprisoned in Qasr Prison in 1958, Qarani went on a hunger strike to protest both the treatment of prisoners and his confinement alongside convicted criminals and smugglers. He ended the strike only after being transferred to another prison ward.

His second imprisonment was reportedly harsher because of his previous record. Following his arrest, he spent nine months in solitary confinement before a military court sentenced him to three years' imprisonment. According to contemporary accounts, the intervention of Hossein Fardoust, one of the Shah's closest advisers, played a significant role in securing his release. Afterward, SAVAK kept all of his activities under close surveillance. Intelligence reports described him as living in severe financial hardship and poor psychological condition.

In 1968, Qarani again became involved in political activities against the Shah. According to published accounts, Hossein Fardoust and Holaku Rambod personally warned him against continuing those activities.

== 1979 Revolution ==
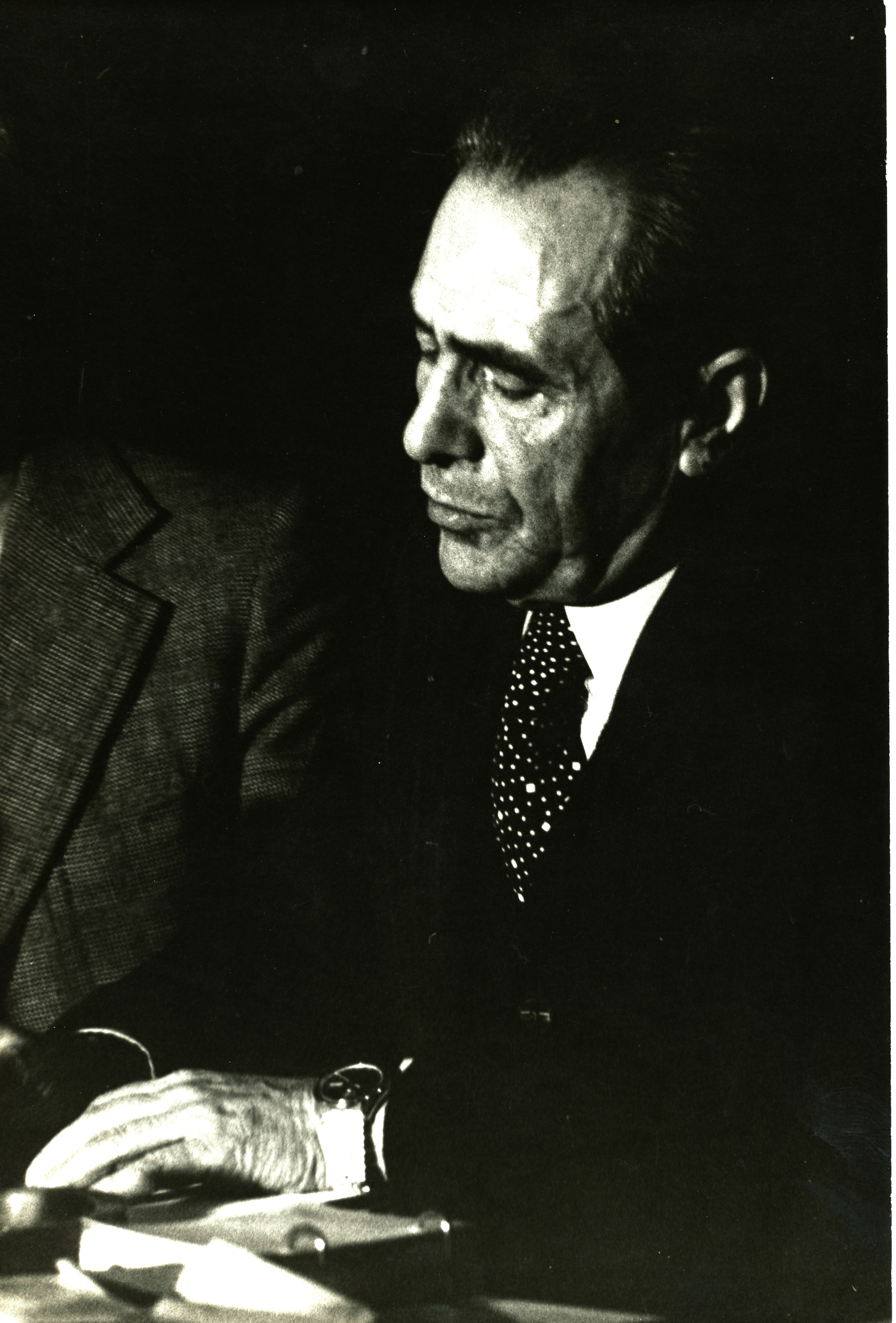
Gharani In the early stages of the 1979 Revolution

During the final months of 1977 and the beginning of 1978, as the revolutionary movement gathered momentum, Qarani maintained his ties with Mahmoud Taleghani, the Freedom Movement of Iran, and other clerics opposed to the Pahlavi government. During the revolution, together with a number of nationalist generals and officers, he helped establish the military branch of the Council of the Islamic Revolution. Other officers associated with the council included Major General Nasser Farbod, who chaired the body, Colonel Nasrollah Tavakoli, Colonel Ezatollah Momtaz, and Brigadier General Hamid Irannejad.

Following the victory of the revolution on 11 February 1979 and the establishment of the Interim Government of Iran, Qarani was appointed, on the recommendation of the Revolutionary Council's military branch, as the first Chief of the Joint Staff of the Islamic Republic of Iran Army. He also became a member of the Council of the Islamic Revolution. He served as Chief of the Joint Staff from 12 February to 27 March 1979.

During his tenure, unrest in Iranian Kurdistan began. Supporters of Qarani maintain that his timely decisions prevented anti-government forces from making further advances. At the same time, left-wing organizations including the Tudeh Party, the People's Mojahedin Organization of Iran (MEK), and the Organization of Iranian People's Fedai Guerrillas—together with the National Democratic Front, advocated dissolving or fundamentally restructuring the army. According to accounts sympathetic to Qarani, these political pressures complicated efforts to preserve and reorganize the armed forces.

Responding to these demands in an interview, Qarani argued that weakening the national army would endanger Iran's independence and territorial integrity. He stated that he intended to create an army capable of preventing any foreign enemy from harming Iran and that reform of the armed forces should proceed gradually on the basis of Islamic principles and justice. He also maintained that, although the army had witnessed misconduct by some individuals during its forty-three-year history, ongoing purges were necessary to reform and preserve the institution.

== Resignation as Chief of the Joint Staff ==
Major General Mohammad-Hadi Shadmehr, who served as Qarani's deputy during his tenure as Chief of the Joint Staff, later described the circumstances surrounding Qarani's resignation.

According to Shadmehr, Qarani asked him to draft a letter of resignation, which Qarani personally delivered to Ruhollah Khomeini in Qom. Shadmehr claimed that Khomeini initially declined to accept the resignation and instructed Qarani to return to his post. Several days later, however, Prime Minister Mehdi Bazargan reportedly invited Qarani to his office and offered to appoint him ambassador to Spain. Qarani replied that he had previously declined the same position under the Shah. Bazargan then informed him that his resignation had been accepted, whereupon Qarani telephoned Shadmehr to say that he was leaving office permanently. Shadmehr recalled that he also left Army Headquarters immediately afterward.

In his resignation letter, Qarani sharply criticized the Provisional Government. He accused senior civilian officials of issuing orders affecting the armed forces without consulting the military leadership, undermining morale, and allowing weapons and military equipment to fall into the hands of unauthorized groups. He also criticized the government's handling of the unrest in Kurdistan, arguing that its decisions contributed to the looting of the Mahabad garrison and the killing of its commander.

== Assassination ==
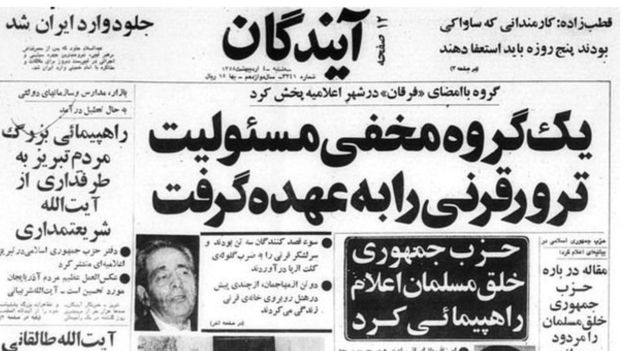
Ayandegan newspaper coverage of Mohammad-Vali Qarani's assassination

On 23 April 1979, Qarani was assassinated at his home on Valiasr Street in Tehran by members of the Forqan Group. Hamid Niknam has been identified in several accounts as the gunman responsible for the attack. Qarani was buried at the Fatima Masumeh Shrine.

He is regarded as one of the first prominent officials to be assassinated after the victory of the Iranian Revolution. Streets in Tehran and several other Iranian cities have since been named in his honor.

According to Mohsen Shojaei, Qarani's driver and bodyguard, who claimed to be the only eyewitness to the attack, a group disguised as house painters had been working at the residence before armed assailants entered the property. Shojaei stated that the attackers disarmed him, shot Qarani inside the house, and fled the scene on motorcycles. Qarani was struck by two bullets, one in the chest and another in the leg. He was taken to Mehr Hospital in Tehran but died shortly after arriving at the surgical ward.

== Legacy and commemoration ==
Following Qarani's assassination, Ruhollah Khomeini issued a statement expressing his condolences and requested that Qarani be buried near Abdolkarim Haeri Yazdi at the Shrine of Fatima Masumeh in Qom. In subsequent speeches, Khomeini repeatedly praised Qarani and referred to him as a loyal supporter of the revolution.

The anniversary of Qarani's assassination is commemorated annually by the Islamic Republic of Iran Army as the "Anniversary of the Martyrdom of the First Chief of the Joint Staff of the Islamic Republic of Iran Army."

A street in Tehran's Fisherabad neighborhood and another in Isfahan have been named Shahid Major General Qarani Street in his honor.

Military offices
Preceded by Abbas Gharabaghi as Chief of the Joint Staff of the Imperial Iranian Army	Chief of the Joint Staff of the Islamic Republic of Iran Army; 12 February 1979–27 March 1979	Succeeded by Nasser Farbod
Preceded by ?	Deputy Chief of the Joint Staff of the Imperial Iranian Army; 1956–1956	Succeeded by ?
Preceded by Mostafa Amjadi	Director of the Second Bureau; 1954–1956	Succeeded by Haj Ali Kia
Preceded by ?	Commander of the Rasht Independent Brigade; 1950–1953	Succeeded by ?
