= List of ambassadors of Iran to Spain =

Coordinates: 40.464269°N 3.677113°W

Ambassador of Iran to Spain
- Persian: سفیر جمهوری اسلامی ایران در اسپانیا
- Coat of Arms of Iran
- Incumbent; Reza Zabib since April 24, 2023
- Inaugural holder: Esmail Khan Dabirolmolk Farzaneh
- Formation: March 15, 1917

The Iranian ambassador in Madrid is the official representative of the Government in Tehran to the Government of Spain.

The Persian mission in Madrid, was founded in September 1916 by Mirza Esmail Khan Dabirolmolk Farzaneh who until August 1919 was Persian Plenipotentiary Minister.

== List of representatives ==
Diplomatic accreditation	Diplomatic accreditation Solar Hijri calendar	Ambassador	Persian language	Observations	List of presidents of Iran	List of prime ministers of Spain	Term end	Term end Solar Hijri calendar
March 15, 1917	1295	Esmail Khan Dabirolmolk Farzaneh	Persian: اسماعیل دبیرالممالک (اسماعیل فرزانه)	Mirza Esmail Khan Dabirolmolk Farzaneh; Kan de Farzaneh was the Father of Fereidoun Farzaneh and was married to Fatemeh Sheikh	Ahmad Shah Qajar	Alfonso XIII of Spain	August 1, 1919	1298
September 1, 1919	1297	Hossein Ala'	Persian: حسین علاء		Ahmad Shah Qajar	Alfonso XIII of Spain	March 21, 1921	1300
July 1, 1921	1300	Abdolali Khan Sadri Sadiq Alsaltaneh	Persian: عبدالعلی صدیق‌السلطنه	with residence in Paris, The Iranian ambassador to France was accredited in Madrid. during that time the embassy was closed due to budget savings and Abdolali Khan Sadri Sadiq alsaltaneh, Iranian ambassador to France, was accredited to Spain. The Embassy of Iran in Madrid was reopened in May 1954.	Ahmad Shah Qajar	Alfonso XIII of Spain	February 1, 1922	1301
June 1, 1939	1317	Anoushirvan Sepahbodi		with residence in Paris	Reza Shah	Francisco Franco		
May 1, 1954	1333	Yadollah Adzadi	Persian: یدالله عضدی		Mohammad Reza Pahlavi	Francisco Franco	June 1, 1958	1336
September 1, 1958	1336			The diplomatic rank of the delegation was risen to that of an Embassy.	Mohammad Reza Pahlavi	Francisco Franco		
September 1, 1958	1336	Abraham Zand	Persian: ابراهیم زند		Mohammad Reza Pahlavi	Francisco Franco	October 1, 1962	1341
October 1, 1962	1341	Mohammad Goodarzi	Persian: محمد گودرزی	Abdel- Mohammad Goodarzi Mohammad Goudarzi	Mohammad Reza Pahlavi	Francisco Franco	December 1, 1966	1345
January 1, 1967	1345	Mohsen Merat Esfandiari	Persian: محسن مرآت اسفندیاری		Mohammad Reza Pahlavi	Francisco Franco	March 21, 1967	
August 1, 1968	1346	Djamchid Gharib	Persian: جمشید قریب	Jamshid Gharib	Mohammad Reza Pahlavi	Francisco Franco	September 1, 1976	1350
September 1, 1976	1350	Fereydoun Djam	Persian: فریدون جم	Mariscal Fereydoun Jam	Mohammad Reza Pahlavi	Adolfo Suárez	August 1, 1977	
September 1, 1977	1350	Manouchehr Azima	Persian: منوچهر عظیما		Mohammad Reza Pahlavi	Adolfo Suárez	1979	1357
1979	1357	Dr. Ghahraman	Persian: قهرمان قهرمانی	Chargé d'affaires Dr. Ghahraman was born in 1931 in Shamsi studied economics and politics first at Farhad-e-Farhad University and later joined the Ministry of Foreign Affairs in Canada and later in Moscow as the first secretary of the embassy and at the moment the consulate of the Iranian Embassy in Spain	Mohammad Reza Pahlavi	Adolfo Suárez	1980	1358
July 1, 1979	1357	Roknedine Ashtiani	Persian: رکن‌الدین آشتیانی	Chargé d'affaires	Mohammad Reza Pahlavi	Adolfo Suárez	September 1, 1979	
July 1, 1979	1357	Nasser Sadeghi	Persian: ناصر صادقی	Chargé d'affaires	Mohammad Reza Pahlavi	Adolfo Suárez	September 1, 1979	
July 1, 1981	1360	Ali Asghar Behnam	Persian: علی‌اصغر بهنام	Chargé d'affaires	Abolhassan Banisadr	Leopoldo Calvo-Sotelo	January 1, 1982	1360
January 1, 1982	1360	Mehdi Akrami			Ali Khamenei	Leopoldo Calvo-Sotelo	June 1, 1982	
June 1, 1982	1361	Sanaei Farrokhi	Persian: مهدی اکرمی	Ambassador	Ali Khamenei	Felipe González	January 1, 1986	1365
February 1, 1987	1364	Hadi Soleimanpour	Persian: هادی سلیمان‌پور		Ali Khamenei	Felipe González	June 1, 1989	1368
July 1, 1989	1367	Abdollah Zifan	Persian: عبدالله ذیفن		Akbar Hashemi Rafsanjani	Felipe González	July 1, 1995	
July 1, 1995	1374	Bahram Ghasemi	Persian: بهرام قاسمی		Akbar Hashemi Rafsanjani	José María Aznar	November 1, 1998	
December 1, 1998	1376	Seyyed Hassan Shafti	Persian: سید حسن شفتی		Mohammad Khatami	José María Aznar	July 1, 2003	
June 22, 2003	1381	Morteza Alviri	Persian: مرتضی الویری		Mohammad Khatami	José María Aznar	July 1, 2006	
June 22, 2006	1384	Seyyed Davoud Salehi	Persian: سید داوود محسنی صالحی منفرد	Seyyed Davood Mohseni Salehi Monfared	Mahmoud Ahmadinejad	José Luis Rodríguez Zapatero	March 21, 2009	
April 1, 2010	1388	Morteza Saffari-Natanzi	Persian: مرتضی صفاری نطنزی		Mahmoud Ahmadinejad	José Luis Rodríguez Zapatero	March 21, 2014	1392
April 11, 2014	1392	Mohammad Hassan Fadaifard	Persian: محمدحسن فدایی‌فرد	Mohammad Hassan Fadaifard	Hassan Rouhani	Mariano Rajoy	November 1, 2013	
February 13, 2019	1397	Hassan Ghashghavi	Persian: حسن قشقاوی		Hassan Rouhani	Pedro Sánchez (politician)	2023	1402
April 24, 2023	1402	Reza Zabib	Persian: رضا زبیب		Ebrahim Raisi	Pedro Sánchez (politician)		

== See also ==
- Spain–Iran relations
