= Nasser Farbod =

Iranian political activist and military officer (1922–2019)

Timsar Seyyed Nasser Farbod
- ناصر فربد
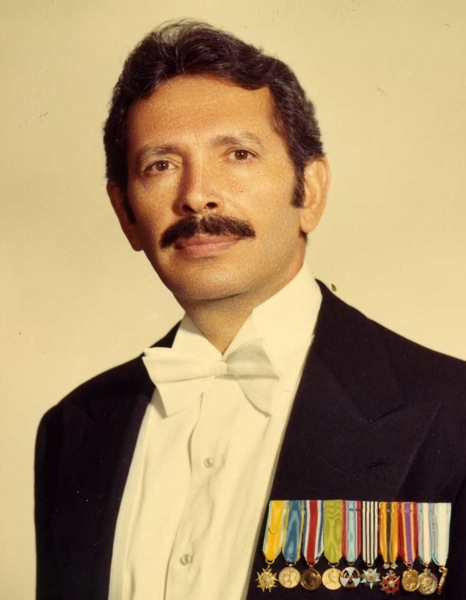
- Farbod in 1979

Chief of the Joint Staff
- In office 27 March 1979 – 12 July 1979
- Prime Minister: Mehdi Bazargan
- Supreme Leader: Ruhollah Khomeini
- Preceded by: Mohammad-Vali Gharani
- Succeeded by: Mohammad-Hossein Shaker

Director of the War College
- In office ? – 7 October 1975
- Monarch: Mohammad Reza Pahlavi
- Prime Minister: Amir-Abbas Hoveyda

Iran's military representative to the Central Treaty Organization (CENTO)
- In office ?–?

Personal details
- Born: 27 April 1922 Tehran, Qajar Iran
- Died: 26 April 2019 (aged 96) Tehran, Iran
- Party: Iran Party
- Other political affiliations: National Front
- Education: Officers' Academy; U.S. Armor School; U.S. Staff College; War College
- Awards: Nishan-e-Quaid-i-Azam
- Website: nasserfarbod.com

Military service
- Allegiance: Pahlavi Iran; Iran
- Branch/service: Imperial Iranian Ground Forces; Islamic Republic of Iran Ground Forces
- Years of service: 1945–1975; 1979
- Rank: Major General Major General
- Unit: 7th Infantry Division; 1st Infantry Division
- Commands: 81st Armoured Division (?–1971)
- Battles/wars: Iran crisis of 1946; 1979 Kurdish rebellion 1979 Turkmen rebellion in Iran; 1979 Khuzestan insurgency

Nasser Farbod (Persian: ناصر فربد; 27 April 1922 – 26 April 2019) was an Iranian military officer and political activist who served as the Chief-of-Staff of the Islamic Republic of Iran Army from 27 March 1979 until his resignation on 12 July 1979. He was a member of the National Front.

== Early life and education ==
Farbod was born on 26 April 1922 in Tehran. After completing his primary and secondary education, he entered the Iranian Military Academy. He later pursued extensive specialized military training abroad. In 1956, he completed specialized armoured warfare training at the Fort Knox Armor School in Kentucky, United States. He graduated from the United States Army Command and General Staff College in 1960. He also completed advanced courses at the National Defense University of Iran in 1967 and the Command and Staff College in Pakistan in 1970.

== Military career ==
=== Imperial era ===
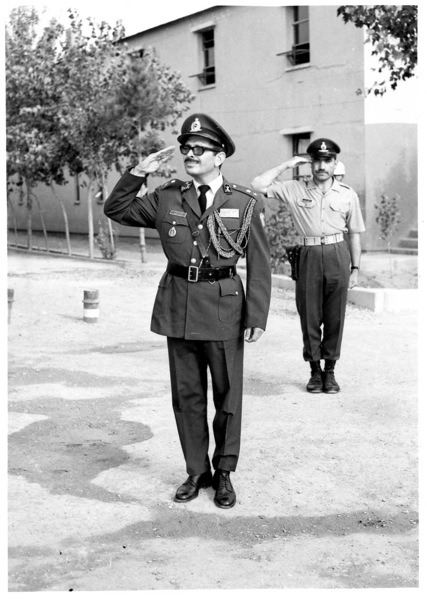
Farbod with the rank of Brigadier General

Farbod specialized in armored warfare and held various command positions within the Imperial Iranian Ground Forces. By 1971, he was promoted to the rank of Brigadier General and appointed commander of Iran's armored units. He served as Iran's military representative to the Central Treaty Organization (CENTO) and was awarded the Quaid-e-Azam medal by the Government of Pakistan for his strategic contributions. On 7 October 1975, Farbod was dismissed from his post as commander of the Military Academy by General Gholam Reza Azhari, acting under direct orders from Shah Mohammad Reza Pahlavi. Following his removal, he was reassigned as an adjutant to the Imperial Army Staff and subsequently retired.

=== Post-Revolutionary era ===
Following the 1979 Iranian Revolution, Farbod aligned with nationalist factions and, alongside other military figures like Major General Mohammad-Vali Gharani, Colonel Nasrollah Tavakoli, Colonel Ezatollah Momtaz, and Brigadier General Hamid Iran-Nejad, formed the military wing of the Revolutionary Council. On 26 March 1979, following the dismissal of Major General Gharani, Prime Minister Mehdi Bazargan appointed Farbod as the Chief of the General Staff of the Army, a decision approved by the Revolutionary Council. During his brief tenure, Farbod officially designated 29 Farvardin (18 April) as "Army Day" following a high-level meeting with Prime Minister Bazargan and a delegation of Revolutionary Council members, including Ali Khamenei, Abbas Amir-Entezam, Dariush Forouhar, and Ahmad Sayyed Javadi. Farbod resigned from his position on 21 July 1979 in protest against the Interim Government's military policies and handling of the unrest in Kurdistan.

== Political activities ==
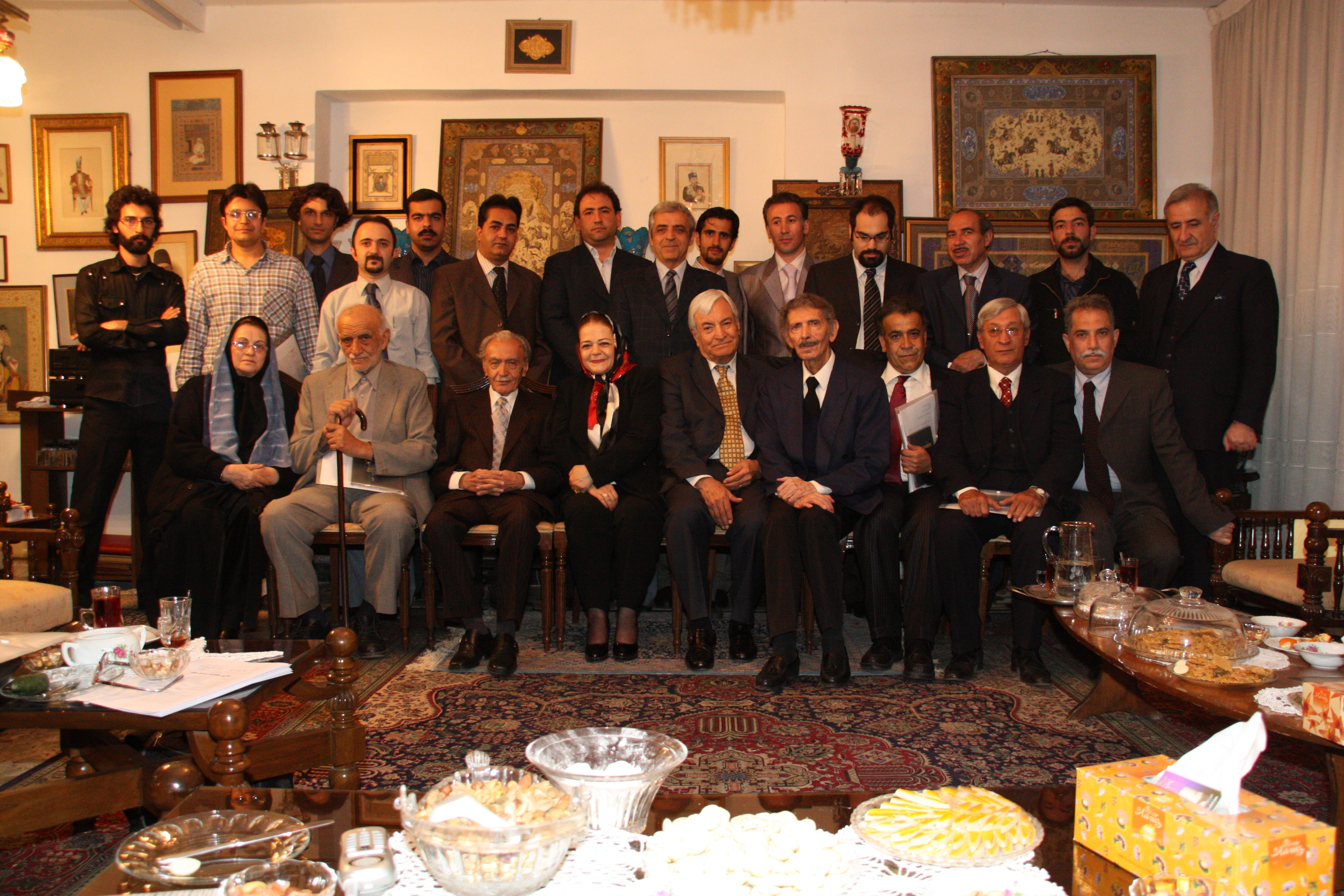
Farbod with national front members in a Nowruz Meeting

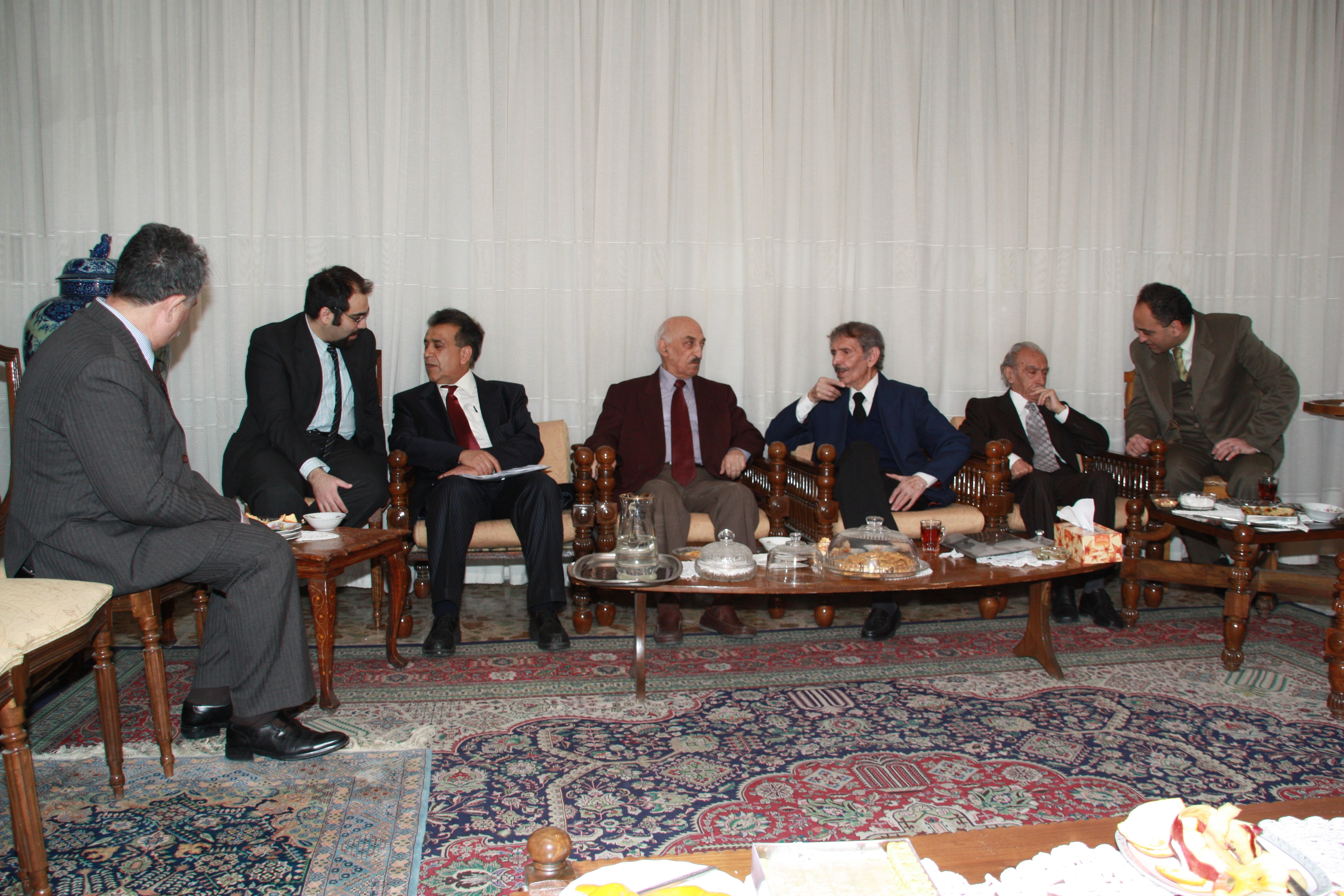
Farbod in a national front meeting

Farbod was an active member of the Central Council of the Iran Party. In 2005, the Central Council of the National Front of Iran elected him to its leadership board, a political position he maintained until 2015. He was also one of the prominent signatories of the "90-Signature Letter," a critical petition addressed to the Iranian government regarding political freedoms.

== Literary and research work ==
In addition to his military and political roles, Farbod authored several books and numerous articles focusing on regional strategy, geopolitics, and philosophy. His published works include:

- Us and Colonialism (1963) – later republished as The Fate of Colonialism in Iran
- My Perception of Existence (Agah, 1975) – a philosophical and mystical work written in both verse and prose
- The Role of the Army in Iran's Developments (Koomesh, 2004)

His poems and philosophical essays were also compiled and published by the Saadi Literary Society under the title Modernization in Mysticism and Philosophy.

== Death ==
Farbod died in Tehran on 26 April 2019.

Military offices
Preceded by Mohammad-Vali Gharani	Chief of the Joint Staff of the Islamic Republic of Iran Army; 27 March 1979–21 July 1979	Succeeded by Mohammad-Hossein Shaker
Preceded by ?	Director of the War College ?–7 October 1975	Succeeded by ?
Preceded by ?	Iran's military representative to the Central Treaty Organization (CENTO) ?–?	Succeeded by ?
Preceded by ?	Commander of to the 81st Armoured Division ?–1971	Succeeded by ?
