= 1979 Kurdish rebellion in Iran =

- Part of the 1979 Iranian ethnic unrest, Iran–Iraq War, and Kurdish separatism in Iran
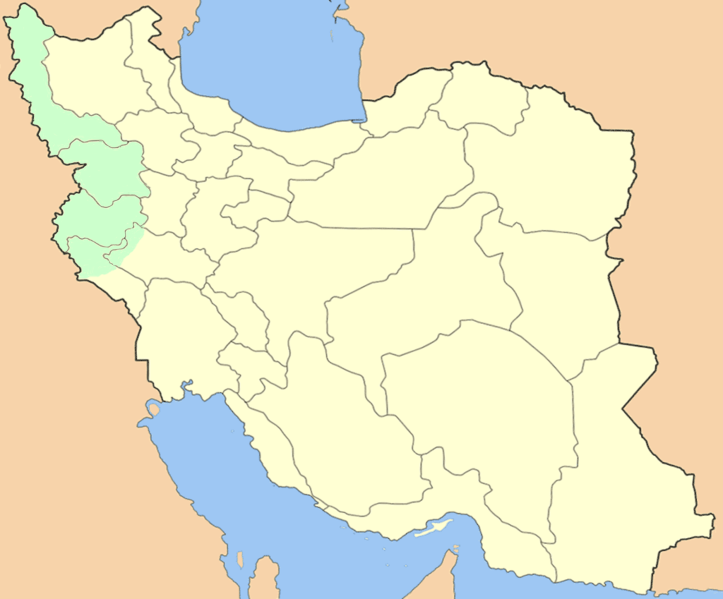
- The epicenter of insurrection
Date	March 1979–1983, 1984–1989, 1989–1996
Location	Iranian Kurdistan
Result	Iranian victory: Iranian forces mostly diverted to the Iran–Iraq War front since late 1980; Pockets of KDPI resistance remained until 1996

Belligerents
Interim Government Islamic Republic of Iran (1980−83); KDP	KDP-I; Komala; IPFG; OIPFG (Minority); Salvation Force Supported by: Iraq

Commanders and leaders
Ruhollah Khomeini # Mehdi Bazargan; Abolhassan Banisadr; Mohammad-Ali Rajai X Mohammad-Javad Bahonar X Mostafa Chamran †; Mohammad-Reza Mahdavi Kani; Ali Khamenei (President of Iran 1981–1989, Supreme Leader of Iran from 1989) (WIA); Mir-Hossein Mousavi; Masoud Barzani; Idris Barzani Army: (Iran) Vali Gharani; (Iran) Nasser Farbod; (Iran) Hossein Shaker; (Iran) Hadi Shadmehr; (Iran) Valiollah Fallahi; (Iran) Qasem-Ali Zahirnejad; (Iran) Ali Sayad Shirazi; IRGC: (Iran) Mohsen Rezaee; (Iran) Mohammad Boroujerdi; (Iran) Mostafa Chamran †; (Iran) Hossein Hamadani	Abdul Rahman Ghassemlou X Sadegh Sharafkandi X Foad Mostafa Soltani †; Abdullah Mohtadi; Sedigh Kamangar X Jafar Shafiyi; Ashraf Dehghani; Muhammad Uthman Siraj al-Din

Units involved
IRI Army; IRGC; Muslim Peshmerga	Peshmerga

Strength
5,000 Revolutionary Guards in Kurdistan province (August 23, 1979); 200,000 by 1982	100,000 armed Kurdish Peshmerga (August 1979), including 2,000 in Paveh, 2,000 in Saqqez, 20,000 in Mahabad, 10,000 near Sardasht, and 5,000 Kurds of Turkey. Artillery included a few captured tanks, light artillery pieces, recoilless guns, and machine guns.

Casualties and losses
3,000 killed	5,000 military deaths 1,200 executed by the government for instigating rebellion Unknown amount of civilian deaths, likely in the tens of thousands
- 12 Iranian officers executed for refusing to fight Total: 10,000 killed; 200,000 displaced

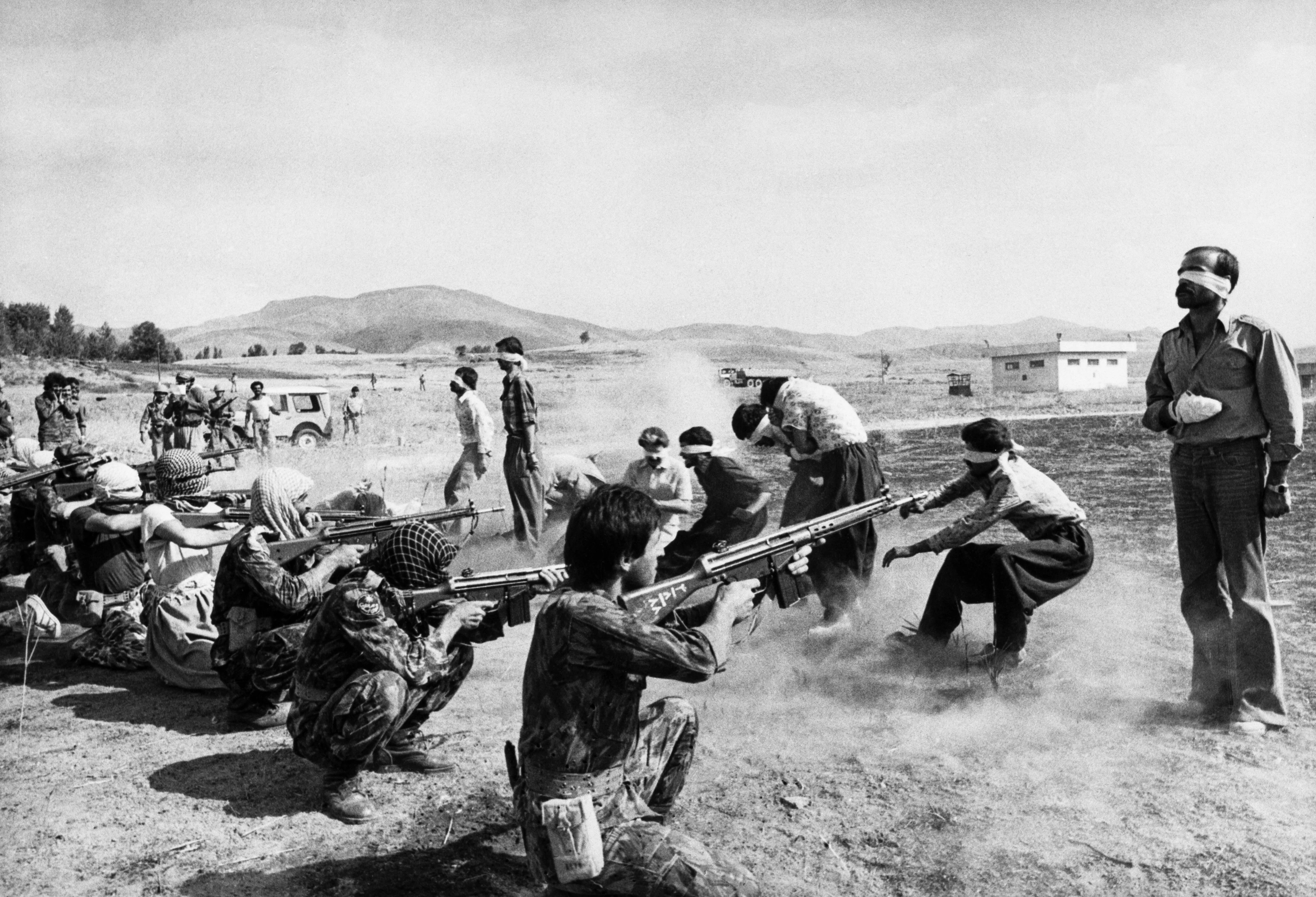
A firing squad during the 1979 Kurdish rebellion in Iran

The 1979 Kurdish rebellion in Iran was one of the largest nationwide uprisings in the country against the new state following the Iranian Revolution. The Kurdish rebellion began in mid-March, just two months after the Revolution ended, and was one of the most intense Kurdish rebellions in modern Iran.

Kurdish groups initially tried to align with Iran's new government in an attempt to emphasize their own Muslim identity and to seek common ground with other Iranians. The Democratic Party of Iranian Kurdistan (KDPI), who strongly campaigned for political autonomy, briefly identified as a non-separatist organization, even criticizing those calling for independence from the state. However, following a number of attacks on Iranian army barracks in the Kurdistan province by militant groups, relations quickly deteriorated. Though Shīʿa Kurds and some Sunni tribal leaders approved of the Shīʿa Islamic State, most Sunni Kurdish leftists and communists continued to push for the independence of Kurdistan. A portion of the Naqshbandi Order also opposed the new state, aligning with the Iraqi army and forming the Sipay Rizgari militant group, under the guidance of Sheikh Muhammad Uthman Siraj al-Din.

Kurdish militants, primarily from the KDPI, initially made territorial gains in Mahabad and temporarily ousted Iranian troops from the region, but a large-scale offensive in spring 1980 by the Islamic Revolutionary Guard Corps reversed the course of the conflict. The start of the Iran–Iraq War in September 1980 saw the Iranian government increasing efforts to snuff the Kurdish rebellion, the only 1979 uprising that remained, in part due to the province's proximity to the Iraqi border. By 1981, the Iranian police and the Revolutionary Guard had ousted the Kurdish militants from their strongholds, but small groups continued to execute sporadic attacks against Iranian militia. Clashes in the area continued until 1983.

About 10,000 people were killed over the course of the rebellion, including 1,200 Kurdish political prisoners executed by the Iranian government and "hundreds of Kurdish villages were razed in retaliation".

There was a resurgence in conflict in 1989 following the assassination of KDPI leader Abdul Rahman Ghassemlou.

== Background ==
After failed rebellions in 1946 and 1967, Kurdish political organizations continued to push for revolution against the Shah Mohammad Reza Pahlavi, a move that brought Ayatollah Ruhollah Khomeini to power in February 1979. Tensions remained between the Kurdish people and the government, even with the new leader installed. Many Iraqi Kurds fled to Kurdistan following Saddam Hussein's crackdown on Kurdish revolts, though they continued their campaign for their right to independence in their new home. In the past, Iran had supported Kurdish fighters in clashes with Iraq. The Kurds were exploited by foreign powers looking to destabilize the young republic.

Unlike others in the country, Iranian Sunni Kurds abstained from voting to endorse the creation of an Islamic Republic in March 1979. That referendum garnered 99.20% approval of the Islamic Republic from Kurdistan, compared to 99.31% nationwide. KDPI leader Abdul Rahman Ghassemlou was barred from joining the Assembly of Experts, the group responsible for writing the new constitution in 1979, despite winning a seat with 34.9% of the vote. The rejection came after Ghassemlou refused the government's request to disarm the KDPI and turn their weapons in to the military.

== Rebellion ==
=== Beginning ===
A wave of nationalism engulfed eastern Kurdistan after the fall of the Pahlavi Dynasty. A series of anti-revolutionary revolts were cropping up across the country, including in Khuzestan and Iranian Baluchestan. In March 1979, the KDPI announced an eight-point plan for Kurdish independence, which was met with opposition from other Kurdish leaders such as Ahmad Moftizadeh who disapproved of the militarism and separatism proposed. In mid-March, Kurdish factions took control of police headquarters, army bases, and parts of army barracks in Sanandaj, killing 21 soldiers when they refused to surrender the barracks to the militants.

BBC reported that the revolt began when Kurdish tribesmen overpowered Iranian militiamen in Paveh. Unrest was then alleged to have spread to other Kurdish-dominated regions such as Divan Darreh, Saqqez, and Mahabad as Kurds took over towns and army garrisons to keep the Iranian military at bay. Many Kurdish leaders went into hiding after Khomeini ordered their arrest and execution. At this point, Iranian newspapers were estimating 600 casualties.

Two groups formed in Sanandaj at this time: one was led by Ahmad Moftizadeh and another by the leader of the city's hussainiya, Safdari. The Iranian government sent a delegate to Sanandaj to meet with representatives of the militant groups. Negotiations resulted in an agreement to end conflict. Afterwards, Brayim Younisi was temporarily appointed governor of Kurdistan by the Ministry of Interior. Armed conflict broke out again in April, initially between Kurdish forces such as the KDPI and Komala against the revolutionary government's forces, but later between Kurdish militants and area Azerbaijani factions, including the Qarapapaq tribe, as well. This resulted in the death of hundreds of Azeris and Kurds.

=== Fighting campaigns and politics ===
In mid-August, the Revolutionary Guard ambushed Paveh in defiance of the army's advice. Since they were unprepared for battle, they were overpowered and encircled by Kurdish militants. The situation prompted Khomeini to meet with the heads of the government and army. In his statement on August 17, he announced a jihad against Kurdish separatists and declared key Kurdish nationalist figures, including Ghassemlou, enemies of the state. A three-week campaign to clear out rebel strongholds in Saqqez and Mahabad followed. A week after the ill-advised siege on Paveh, the city was captured by the Revolutionary Guard after the Kurdish withdrew. This marked the beginning of the Iranian counteroffensive.

By August 20, the Iranian army had begun attacking Mahabad; they managed to completely surround it by August 30. Three days of negotiations began but ultimately failed, and Iranian forces launched another onslaught of the city on September 3. Using F-4 fighter jets, artillery, and more than 100 tanks, they managed to seize control of Mahabad after just a few hours. Iranian forces continued pushing forward and took the town of Baneh. More than 500 people were killed during the siege. By the end of the campaign, Iranian forces had also recaptured Marivan, Bastam, Sardasht, Bukan, and Saqqez. The Kurdish Peshmerga retreated into the mountains during the attacks and resumed their offensive six weeks later, returning to Mahabad and using Molotov cocktails and rocket-propelled grenades to fight the Iranian troops. At the end of November, while the Iranian government was occupied with other events in the country such as the American Embassy hostage crisis, the Kurds sieged Sanandaj, Saqqez, and other captured cities and towns.

In a Radio Iran speech on December 17, Khomeini said that ethnic minorities were contrary to Islamic doctrines and that those against the union of Muslim countries were at fault for creating the issue of nationalism within these minority groups. In late January, after President Banisadr took office, Revolutionary Guard units and government-aligned Kurds unsuccessfully attacked rebels in the region, resulting in a stalemate that lasted until spring. By May 1980, Kurds still controlled most of Kurdistan's roads and rural areas and held Mahabad as their capital. The KDPI claimed to have more than 7,000 fighters at this time.

=== Spring 1980 Iranian offensive ===
In the spring of 1980, government forces under the command of President Banisadr once again captured most of the Kurdish cities through a massive military campaign, sending in mechanized military divisions to Kurdish cities including Sanandaj, Pawe, and Marivan. Neighbourhoods of some villages and towns were destroyed as a result of the fighting between Kurdish rebels and government forces. Ayatollah Khalkhali sentenced thousands of Kurds to execution after summary trials. The Kurds continued to control Mahabad as the summer fighting diminished. Iranian-Iraqi tensions grew amid Iraqi attacks on Qasr-e Shirin and Sarpol-e Zahab, prompting Iran to move its army to the border.

=== Autumn 1980 Iranian operations ===
Mahabad remained under Kurdish control for another five months until the Iran–Iraq War bled into the Kurdistan province. Following this invasion, President Banisadr ordered a ceasefire, but the Revolutionary Guard ignored him and continued their campaign. The situation was further complicated by Iranian Kurds receiving Iraqi support for the insurgency. It was initially assumed that Iraqi and Iranian Kurds would cooperate to exploit weaknesses on both sides. Neither Baghdad nor Tehran were willing to accept that outcome and both sides insisted on organizing special loyalist Kurdish military units to participate in the war and to demonstrate allegiance to their respective states.

Prior to June 1980, the KDPI requested an official allegiance with Saddam Hussein's Iraq, resulting in the signing of a seven-point agreement in Kirkuk. According to Ghassemlou, Iraq provided the Kurdish forces with ammunition and anti-aircraft missiles taken from the Iranian army. Despite this alliance, however, Ghassemlou still pursued neutrality against Iraqi Kurdish factions, such as the Kurdistan Democratic Party and the Patriotic Union of Kurdistan, and served as an intermediary in negotiations between these groups and Baghdad.

The alliance with Iraq created divides within the KDPI. In late May, Ghani Bulurian and six other central committee members renounced their party membership and published Ghassemlou's private correspondence with the Iraqis, including information about a meeting between him and Iraqi vice president Taha Yasin Ramadan.

=== Final stage ===
In January 1981, the Iraqi army successfully established a supply line to KDPI strongholds through Nowdesheh and Qasr-e Shirin, and began sending military equipment their way. This allowed the KDPI to cut off the Baghdad-Tehran highway, blocking Iranian forces from using this main thoroughfare. By late 1981, however, a counteroffensive from the Iranian forces pushed Iraqi forces back over the border, debilitating the KDPI and rendering them a marginal military factor for the rest of the war. More than 10,000 Kurdish forces were alleged to have been killed.

Despite the KDPI's military defeat, armed remnants of the group continued to shelter in northern Iraq and engage in low-level campaigns against Iranian forces. This lasted until 1983, when more Iranian forces were diverted to the Iraqi front amid escalation of the Iran-Iraq War. Komala militants also moved their military bases to Iraqi Kurdistan following Iranian operations on the border.

== Aftermath ==
While most of KDPI's military and political activity in Iran was greatly reduced after the 1979-1981 rebellion, they continued their opposition activities throughout the 1980s. Starting in 1985, military conflict broke out between the KDPI and Komala inside northern Iraq, leading to hundreds of deaths among the two rebel groups. In 1989, the KDPI resumed its military activities against the government. Following a political and military crackdown in 1996, the conflict between KDPI and the Iranian government mainly shifted to political opposition abroad rather than violence within the country. Insurgency was renewed in 2004 by the Kurdistan Free Life Party, a militant group affiliated with the Turkish Kurdistan Workers' Party and the Kurdistan Communities Union.

According to New Lines Magazine, "Iranian Kurdish armed groups have maintained bases in northern Iraq since they were pushed into exile in the early 1980s, when an insurrection for self-determination and rights was brutally suppressed by the Iranian regime. Hundreds of Kurdish villages were razed in retaliation."

Despite having stressed their Shia identity during the 1979 revolution, younger Kurds from Kermanshah and nearby Shia regions later increasingly joined the KDPI, Komala, and other Kurdish leftist groups, while the Shia Kurdish factions from Kermanshah began to openly criticize the government and emphasize their ethnic identity by the late 1990s. Kermanshah and Ilam, which remained among the most deprived regions even four decades after the revolution, witnessed newer generations of Kurdish activists and increased solidarity with Kurdistan and West Azerbaijan. Nevertheless, the 1979 Kurdish revolt in Iran being largely limited to Sunni regions led to some Persian authors equating Kurdish nationalism with Sunni Kurds.

== Timeline of events in 1979 ==
February 1979

- February 25: Iranian Phantom II jets bomb Kurdish villages near the Iraqi border.

March 1979

- March 1: Mahabad remains in control of army barracks. Demonstrations and clashes occur across Kurdistan, including in Saqqiz and Mahabad.
- March 2: Mahabad remains the only Kurdish city not under Khomeini's control. The Kurds maintain political control in Kermanshah and have control over the local brigade-sized army camp.
- March 3: Two hundred thousand Kurds rally in Mahabad, the first public display of the KDPI's revival, to demand autonomy.
- March 4: Mahabad, Saanadaj, and Kermanshah set their official language as the Kurdish language. Armed rebels have control over law and order.
- March 17: The rebellion begins.
- March 18: After the KDP, took control of the Mahabad military base Komala tried to control the military base in the city of Sanandaj, but they failed and the army, bombarded the city. The fighting in Sanandaj lasted for about two weeks and many civilians were killed. The Kurdish forces remained in Sanandaj and the Persian army could not control the city.
- March 19: Protests erupt in Sanandaj and the army barracks are captured. After being denied ammunition from the army, Kurdish forces arm themselves using supplies from the barracks. In the mountainous region along the Iraqi border, Kurds seize army barracks and radio stations. Two helicopters from the government fire at the rebels and 170 are killed.
- March 20: Casualties reach 106 in Sanandaj as helicopters are sent to the city.
- March 23: Fighting in Sanandaj slows and 168 political prisoners are released. A ceasefire is declared.
- March 25: Negotiations between Ayatollah Taleghani and Ahmad Moftizadeh take place in Sanandaj.
- March 26: Ninety-seven more Kurdish political prisoners are released.

April 1979

- April 2: Conflict intensifies near the Iraqi border.
- April 21: Komala blocks the road leading to Naqadeh and 10 people are killed.
- April 22: Fighting between Kurds and Turks intensifies in Naqadeh, with casualties reaching 80. Iranian forces arrive.
- April 26: Fighting between Kurds and Turks largely subsides in West Azerbaijan with casualties at 1,000.

June 1979

- June 4: Iraqi fighter jets attack several villages in Kurdistan and kill seven. Thousands of Kurds resume protesting for autonomy in Mahabad.

July 1979

- July 24: Kurdish rebels seize army barracks in Khoy.
- July 28: Forces fight for control of roads in Kurdistan leading to the Iraqi border, numbering 20 casualties. Residents of Marivan flee as Iranian troops invade and take control of the city. Kurdish troops remain in the surrounding hills and block Marivan-to-Iraq border roads; 20 Iranian soldiers are killed. Rebels also control railroads leading to Turkey. Roads to Marivan from the east are controlled by the government.

August 1979

- August 14: About 2,000 Kurdish KDPI rebels begin clashes in Paveh.
- August 16: After 2 days and 18 casualties, Kurdish rebels gain control of Paveh and its surrounding mountain passes.
- August 18: Mostafa Chamran is trapped in Paveh by Kurdish troops. Later, Iranian troops retake the city and the Kurds return to the surrounding mountains.
- August 19: Iranian troops appear on the outskirts of Sanandaj. Eleven Kurdish rebels from Paveh are executed.
- August 20: Iranian troops and Kurdish rebels fight north of Mahabad County.
- August 21: Twenty-nine more rebels are executed as Iranian troops move towards Kurdistan. Rebels maintain control of all roads leading to Mahabad.
- August 23: Fighting continues. Eighty-nine rebels and 102 Iranian troops are killed. Kurd-controlled Saqqiz avoids capture as 2,000 Kurdish soldiers push Iranian troops 12 miles (19 km) out of town. At this point, around 5,000 Iranian troops have been deployed to Kurdistan. Rebels gain control of an important border route south of Saqqiz and hold both Baneh and Bukan.
- August 24: A stalemate occurs 20 miles (32 km) outside of Mahabad. Iranian army has presence in the outskirts of Saqqez where town is under rebel control. 22 government troops are killed when moving towards Saqqez via Sanandaj.
- August 25: Government officials announce Saqqiz has fallen but the KDPI denies this. Each camp controls half of the city. Twenty-nine Kurds are executed and there are 16 fighting casualties. The highway between Saqqiz and Mahabad and Miandoab to Mahabad remain under rebel control. Iranian troops surround Miandoab and nine Kurds are executed in Marivan. Ghassemlou estimates that there are 100,000 armed rebels around the province.
- August 26: Saqqiz is officially occupied by Iranian troops. Their next planned strike is Solduz.
- August 27: Ceasefires are negotiated while 11 Kurds are executed near Sanandaj and the northern region of Sanandaj County is captured.
- August 28: Ceasefires are declined and 20 Kurds are executed.
- August 29: Jaldian is attacked by rebels. Two more Kurds are executed.
- August 30: Iranian troops continue to close in on Mahabad.

September 1979

- September 1: F-4 fighter jets and artillery push Kurds out of Saqqez, Bastam, and the mountainous region surrounding Baneh. Iranian tanks are within 3 miles (4.8 km) of Mahabad and more than 100 Kurds are executed.
- September 2: Twenty thousand rebels push 400 Iranian troops from the mountains of Mahabad. Iranian troops retreat to Miandoab and manage to capture Bukan and Piranshahr. They also now control all routes leading to Mahabad. Iranian funerals are held in Naqadeh.
- September 3: Rebel forces move south but Iranian troops break their line of defense.
- September 4: Iranian troops capture Mahabad and push into Baneh County. Rebels retreat to Sardasht and manage to kill 16 Iranian troops near Do Ab.
- September 5: Rebels are captured in Sardasht and eight are executed. Fifty thousand armed Kurds flee to the Iraqi border but manage to capture Piranshahr.
- September 6: Sardasht is captured by the Iranians. An ultimatum has been offered to rebels near Saqqiz.
- September 7: Five thousand Turkish Kurds volunteer to fight alongside the rebels.

October 1979

- October 13: Rebels move towards Mahabad.
- October 20: Rebels recapture Mahabad.
- October 31: Rebels claim control of most roads leading to Mahabad.

November 1979

- November 2: The government begins negotiations with the KDPI to give them some level of autonomy.
- November 3: Iranian troops are ordered to stop fighting so peace may be negotiated. Non-Kurdish leftist rebels fighting in Baneh disrupt the peace.
- November 20: Ghassemlou delivers a speech in Mahabad.
- November 26: Kurds declare a truce with Iran and agree to ally with them against the United States. A 20-day ceasefire is agreed upon and troops withdraw from Kurdistan. By the end of November, almost every significant Kurdish city is again under attack from government troops.

December 1979

- December 3: Kurds do not participate in the referendum.
- December 4: Negotiation tensions increase.
- December 6: Iranian troops move into Kurdistan to stop the unrest after the referendum. Helicopters bomb three Kurdish villages near Urmia. The military begins to surround Sanadaj.
- December 30: Revolutionary Guards are kidnapped near the Kermanshah province.

== In media ==
In 2006, Ettela'at photographer Jahangir Razmi released 27 photos he had taken of the 1979 firing squad execution of eleven Kurdish prisoners. At the time of the execution, a state-owned holding company seized Ettela'at after one of these photos ran across six columns of the paper a few weeks later. Razmi won a Pulitzer Prize for these photos in 1980.

The 2014 film Che won a number of awards, including two Crystal Simorghs in the fields of best editing and best visual effects. The film detailed the experiences of Mostafa Chamran during the battle for Paveh.

== See also ==
- Timeline of Kurdish uprisings
- Kurdish independence movement in Iran

== Notes ==
1. "Free to discuss its political views, the KDPI came out of thirty years of clandestine existence and made public claims for political autonomy"; "Despite its criticisms of the regime, in its early post-revolutionary public discourses the KDPI called itself an authentically national and Iranian party." (Denise, pp. 144-145)
2. "Instead of creating a cohesive Kurdish nationalist movement, some Kurdish leaders such as Husayni's brother Shaykh Jalal accepted Iraqi military assistance and formed a Sunni militia opposed to the Iranian government and Kurdish nationalist parties. Qasimlu differentiated his real Kurdish nationalist party from traitors within the KDPI. Others, such as the prominent Ghani Bolourian, tried to negotiate with the central government. After the revolution, some Shi'a Kurds from Ilam, Kermanshah and West Azerbaijan turned away from Kurdish nationalists and towards non-Kurdish Shi'a communities. Sunni Kurdish leftists continued to direct the nationalist project in their enclave in Kurdistan Province, having marginal influence over Shi'a Kurds in other regions." (Denise, pp. 1945)
3. "Sending in Pasdaran (Revolutionary Guard) rather than regular army troops, and dispatching the Ayatollah Sadiq Khalkhali—the "Hanging Judge"—resulted in the deaths of nearly 10,000 Kurds in the 1979–82 period alone, many in mass executions ordered by Khalkhali." (Smith, p. 19)
