= Fereydoun Djam =

Iranian military officer (1915–2008)

Timsar Fereydoun Djam
- فریدون جم
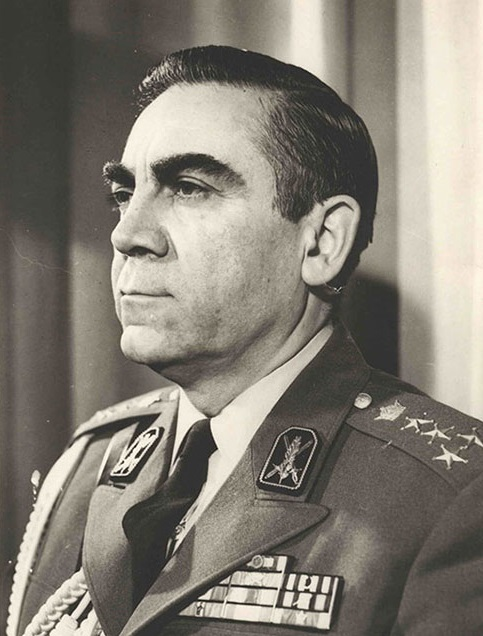
- General Djam c. the late 1960s

Iranian Ambassador to Spain
- In office October 1971 – 1978
- Monarch: Mohammad Reza Pahlavi
- Prime Minister: Amir-Abbas Hoveyda; Jamshid Amouzegar; Jafar Sharif-Emami
- Preceded by: Jamshid Gharib
- Succeeded by: Manouchehr Azima

Chief of the Joint Staff
- In office 4 May 1969 – 19 July 1971
- Monarch: Mohammad Reza Pahlavi
- Prime Minister: Amir-Abbas Hoveyda
- Preceded by: Bahram Aryana
- Succeeded by: Gholam Reza Azhari

Deputy Chief of the Joint Staff
- In office 1966 – 4 May 1969
- Monarch: Mohammad Reza Pahlavi
- Prime Minister: Amir-Abbas Hoveyda
- Preceded by: ?
- Succeeded by: Gholam Reza Azhari

Commandant of Officers' Academy
- In office 1959–1962
- Monarch: Mohammad Reza Pahlavi
- Prime Minister: Manouchehr Eghbal; Jafar Sharif-Emami; Ali Amini
- Preceded by: ?
- Succeeded by: ?

Director of the 3rd bureau
- In office 1955–?
- Monarch: Mohammad Reza Pahlavi
- Prime Minister: Fazlollah Zahedi
- Preceded by: ?
- Succeeded by: Fereydoun Kousheshi

Personal details
- Born: 29 April 1914 Tabriz, Qajar Iran
- Died: 24 May 2008 (aged 94) London, England, United Kingdom
- Spouse(s): Princess Shams Pahlavi (m. 1937; div. 1944) Firouzeh Saed
- Relations: Mahmoud Djam (father)
- Education: Officers' Academy; Saint-Cyr; Aberdeen Proving Ground

Military service
- Allegiance: Pahlavi Iran
- Branch/service: Imperial Iranian Ground Force
- Years of service: 1934–1971
- Rank: General
- Commands: Second Army (1965–1966); Chief of the Ground Forces Combat Research and Evaluation Organizationf (1964–1965); Deputy Commander of the First Army (1962–1964)
- Battles/wars: World War II; Anglo-Soviet invasion of Iran; Siahkal incident

Fereydoun Djam (Persian: فريدون جم; 29 April 1915 – 24 May 2008) was a senior Iranian Imperial Army official, and the son of former Iranian prime minister Mahmoud Djam.

== Early life and education ==
Fereydoun Djam was born on 29 April 1915 in Tabriz, Iran. His father Mahmoud Djam was prime minister of Iran from 1935 to 1939.

Jam completed his primary and secondary education in Tehran and Paris. Against his father's wishes, he enrolled at the Saint-Cyr Military Academy in France. According to his own account, he had dreamed of a military career since the age of eight. After entering Saint-Cyr, he had little desire to return to Iran and hoped instead to serve in the French Army.

== Career ==
Reza Shah, however, considered him a suitable husband for one of his daughters and instructed Prime Minister Mahmoud Jam to summon his son back to Tehran. Reluctantly complying with the order, Fereydoun completed his education at the Iranian Officers' Academy, graduating in 1937 as a Second Lieutenant. One year later, he married Princess Shams Pahlavi, the elder sister of Mohammad Reza Pahlavi.

Jam accompanied Reza Shah and members of the Pahlavi family during the former monarch's exile on Mauritius and later in Johannesburg, where he maintained a close personal relationship with him. Following Reza Shah's death in Johannesburg in 1944, Jam returned to Iran, ended what was widely regarded as a marriage of convenience to Princess Shams, and devoted himself entirely to his military career.

After graduating from the Staff College of Camberley, he was promoted to Brigadier General and appointed Commandant of the Officers' Academy. He reorganized the academy along Western lines, transforming it into a modern and advanced military educational institution.

Following his tenure at the Officers' Academy, Jam advanced through a succession of command appointments. As a Lieutenant General, he became Deputy Chief of the Joint Staff.

Djam served as Chief of the Joint Staff of the Iranian Imperial Army from 1969 to 1971. He left the army because of professional conflicts with Mohammad Reza Pahlavi and retired in 1973. After resignation from the army he became Iranian ambassador to Spain for a few years up to 1978. Then he moved to London.

To the last government led by Shapour Bakhtiar before revolution he was proposed to be defense minister, but according to his interview later on due to lack of authority he did not accept the position. He believed that the declaration of impartiality by army core at the last day of revolution was a betrayal. Following the revolution he did not come back to the country but during the Iran–Iraq War he was supporting the Iranian army.

== Personal life ==
In an arranged marriage Fereydoun married to Princess Shams in 1937. They divorced after the death of Reza Shah in 1944.

== Legacy ==
In 2011, the School of Oriental and African Studies (SOAS) was awarded a gift of £2 million by the Fereydoun Djam Charitable Trust to promote Iranian studies. As part of this initiative, SOAS has introduced new scholarships in Iranian studies as well as an annual lecture series to promote diverse aspects of Iranian studies. The annual lectures are hosted by the Centre for Iranian Studies at SOAS and are named after Fereydoun’s son, Kamran Djam, who predeceased his parents in 1989.

Military offices
Preceded by ?	Head of the Third Directorate] 1955–?	Succeeded by Fereydoun Kousheshi
Preceded by ?	Commander of the Officers' Academy; 1959–1962	Succeeded by ?
Preceded by ?	Deputy Commander of the 1st Army; 1962–1964	Succeeded by ?
New title	Head of the Combat Research and Evaluation Organization of the Ground Forces; 1964–1965	Succeeded by ?
Preceded by ?	Commander of the 2nd Army; 1965–1966	Succeeded by Jafar Shafaghat
Preceded by ?	Deputy Chief of the Joint Staff of the Imperial Iranian Armed Forces; 1966–1969	Succeeded by Gholam Reza Azhari
Preceded by Bahram Aryana	Chief of the Joint Staff of the Imperial Iranian Armed Forces; 4 May 1969–19 July 1971	Succeeded by Gholam Reza Azhari
Diplomatic posts
Preceded by Jamshid Gharib	Ambassador of Iran to Spain; 1971–1978	Succeeded by Manouchehr Azima
