= Mohammad-Hossein Shaker =

Iranian retired military officer

Timsar Mohammad-Hossein Shaker
- محمدحسین شاکر
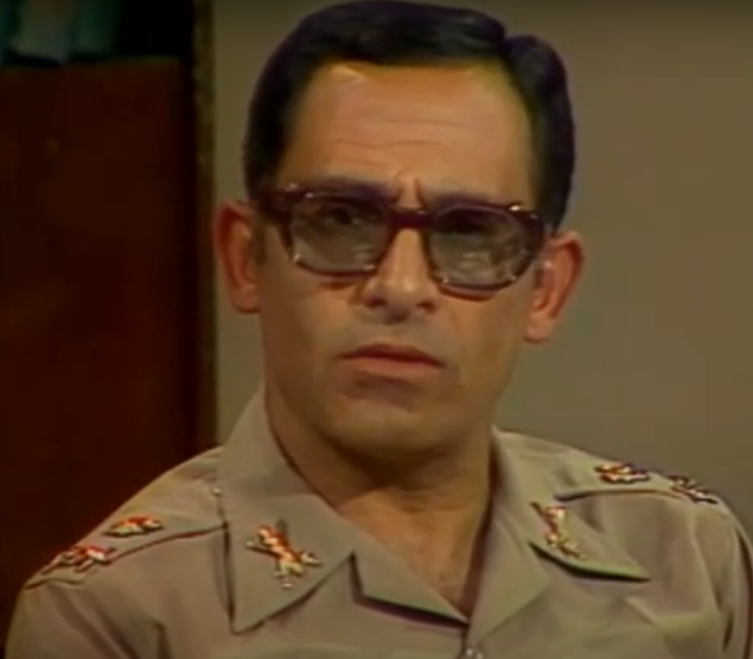
- Shaker in 1979
- Born: 1928 (age 97–98); Shiraz, Pahlavi Iran
- Education: Iranian Military Academy; War University; Command and General Staff College
- Military career
- Allegiance: Pahlavi Iran (1940s–1979); Iran (1979)
- Branch: Imperial Iranian Ground Forces; Islamic Republic of Iran Ground Forces
- Service years: 1940s–1979 1979
- Rank: Brigadier General Major General
- Commands: Chief of the Joint Staff (1979); Deputy Director of the Iranian Military Academy (?–1979)
- Conflicts: 1979 Iranian ethnic unrest; 1979 Kurdish rebellion in Iran; 1979 Turkmen rebellion in Iran; 1979 Khuzestan insurgency; 1979 Azeri rebellion in Iran

Mohammad-Hossein Shaker (Persian: محمدحسین شاکر) is an Iranian retired military officer who served as the Chief-of-Staff of the Islamic Republic of Iran Army from 21 July 1979 until 22 December 1979.

== Early career and education ==
Mohammad-Hossein Shaker was born in 1928 in Shiraz. Prior to the 1979 Revolution, he attained the rank of Brigadier General and served as the deputy commander of the Iranian Military Academy. Following the revolution, he was initially placed on compulsory retirement by the transitional authorities.

== Military Command ==
Shortly after his initial retirement, Shaker was recalled to active duty and appointed as the third Chief of the Joint Staff of the Islamic Republic of Iran Army. Upon taking command, he was promoted to the rank of Major General, making him the first military officer to be promoted to this rank under the newly established Islamic Republic of Iran. His tenure as Chief of Staff was brief, lasting less than six months from July to December 1979. He succeeded Major General Nasser Farbod in this position and was subsequently succeeded by Major General Mohammad-Hadi Shadmehr under the direct orders of Ayatollah Khomeini.

== Political attendance ==
During his tenure as the highest-ranking official of the military, Shaker attended the opening session of the Assembly of Experts for Constitution, which was convened to draft the new constitution of the Islamic Republic. At the time of the opening session, he attended holding the rank of Brigadier General before his subsequent promotion.

Military offices
Preceded by Nasser Farbod	Chief of the Joint Staff of the Islamic Republic of Iran Army; 21 July 1979–22 December 1979	Succeeded by Mohammad-Hadi Shadmehr
Preceded by ?	Deputy Director of the Iranian Military Academy ?–1979	Succeeded by ?
