= Asadollah Nasr Esfahani =

Iranian politician (1927–2026)

- اسدالله نصر اصفهانی

Minister of Interior
- In office 7 August 1977 – 28 August 1978
- Prime Minister: Jamshid Amouzegar
- Preceded by: Jamshid Amouzegar
- Succeeded by: Abbas Gharabaghi

Personal details
- Born: 10 February 1927 Isfahan, Persia
- Died: August 2026 (aged 99) California, U.S.
- Party: Rastakhiz Party
- Education: University of Tehran; Indiana University

Military service
- Allegiance: Pahlavi Iran
- Branch/service: Imperial Iranian Army
- Years of service: 1945–1979
- Rank: Lieutenant general

Asadollah Nasr Esfahani (Persian: اسدالله نصر اصفهانی; 10 February 1927 – 23 August 2026) was an Iranian military officer and politician who during the second Pahlavi period held positions such as governor of Fars and Kerman and the Minister of Interior.

== Early life ==
Esfahani was born in Isfahan on 10 February 1927, and after completing his primary education, he entered the Shahrbani Police Higher School. He held a bachelor's degree in law, a master's degree and a doctorate in law from the Faculty of Law and Political Science, University of Tehran, and a master's degree in management from Indiana University. Nasr was fluent in English and German.

== Military and political activities ==
Nasr had the rank of colonel in the police and his last position in the police was the head of the police planning department. His other services include the head of the University of Police. During the Minister of Interior, Jamshid Amouzegar was appointed governor of Kerman and Fars.

On 7 August 1977, he was named is Minister of Interior in Jamshid Amouzegar cabinet.

Nasr Esfahani was introduced by Jamshid Amouzegar in 1977 as a member of the political bureau of the Rastakhiz Party.

== Political activities after the revolution ==
After the Iranian Revolution, Nasr Esfahani left Iran. He was later the Secretary of the Iranian Solidarity Congress. According to Siavash Avesta, he was a founding member of more than 38 parties and groups abroad.

== Death ==
Esfahani died on 23 August 2026, at the age of 99.
