= Shamsi, Iran =

Shamsi شمسي
- Village
- Location within Iran
- Coordinates: 32°05′57″N 54°06′36″E
- Country: Iran
- Province: Yazd
- County: Saduq
- Bakhsh: Central
- Rural District: Rostaq

Population (2006)
  - Total: 1,267
- Time zone: UTC+3:30 (IRST)
  - Summer (DST): UTC+4:30 (IRDT)

Shamsi (Persian: شمسي, also Romanized as Shamsī; also known as Shamar and Shamsābād) is a village in Rostaq Rural District, in the Central District of Saduq County, Yadz province, Iran. At the 2006 census, its population was 1,267, in 369 families.
