= Holaku Rambod =

Iranian politician

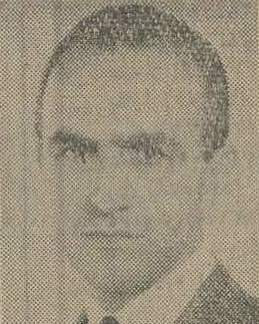

Advisory Minister to Parliament
- In office 7 August 1977 – 27 August 1978
- Prime Minister: Jamshid Amouzegar
- Preceded by: Mahmoud Kachifi
- Succeeded by: Position abolished

Personal details
- Born: 10 November 1919 Tehran, Persia
- Died: 22 April 2007 (aged 87) Nancy, France
- Party: Rastakhiz Party

Holaku Rambod (10 November 1919 – 22 April 2007) was an Iranian politician and a member of the Iranian Parliament from the 19th to the 24th term.

== Background ==
Rambod was born in 1919 in Tehran. He attended Nezam Elementary School from the sixth grade and graduated from the Officers' College in the artillery branch with the rank of second lieutenant.

After completing the staff college course, Rambod served as commander of his artillery regiment from 1939 to 1942. He left the army in 1952 and went to America, where he took business management courses.

== Business and financial activities ==
Between 1951 and 1957, Rambod was the manager of the Press Express and Etan Express joint ventures. After the establishment of the Civil Aviation Association, he became the union's secretary general. He was in charge of the Alitalia company in Tehran for seven years.

== Political activity ==
Before the 1953 coup, Rambod was a member of the National Front but later he became interested in the Pahlavi regime. The beginning of his political career was participating in the elections of the 17th and 18th terms of the National Assembly, in which he was unsuccessful. He did manage to get elected and represent the People's Party in the 19th until the 24th terms of the National Assembly.

Rambod was not only the main spokesperson of the party in the parliament but was also considered one of the party's most active and ambitious leaders. He believed that the People's Party faced internal and external problems. He used to say: "The New Iran Party uses government agencies to put pressure on the People's Party and its personnel, and the People's Party has no means to fight back and even protect its personnel, so there is little hope for progress within the party."

Rambod tried to unify party members and bridge deep divisions within the party. In 1960, the People's Party was led by Asadullah Alam. Rambod was one of Alam's friends and the leader of the People's Party in the National Assembly. In his constituency, he was in tight competition with the leader of the Novin Iran Party, Suleiman Pasha Khan Babakan Sasani.

== Attending the government minister ==
In 1977, Rambod resigned as the people's representative in Jamshid Amouzegar's cabinet and was appointed Advisory Minister to Parliament.

== After the Islamic Revolution in Iran ==
Rambod was sentenced to death by the Islamic Revolutionary Court after the 1979 Iranian revolution and his property was confiscated. He left Iran for France and lived in exile until his death in April, 2007 in Nancy.

Habib Lajordi interviewed Rambod in Nice, France in 1983 as part of Iran's oral history project.
