= Ahmad Moftizadeh =

Kurdish nationalist and Islamist leader

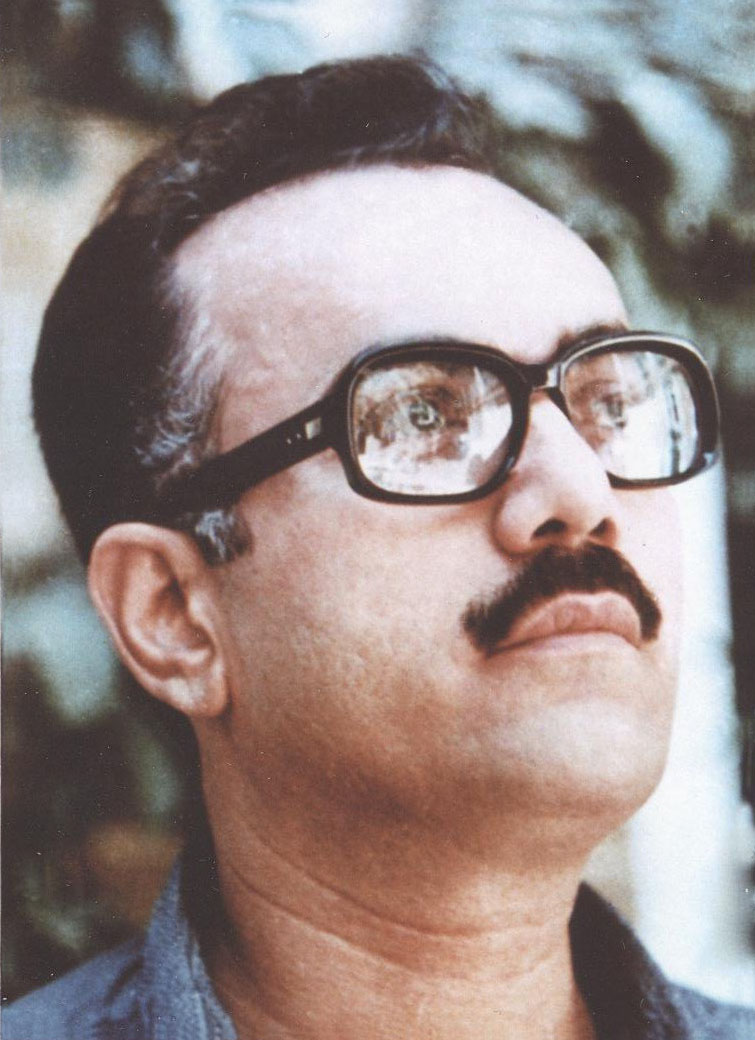

Personal life
- Born: February 1933 Sanandaj, Iran
- Died: 9 February 1993 (aged 59–60) Tehran, Iran
- Other name: Ellameh Ahmad Moftizadeh

Religious life
- Religion: Islam

Muslim leader
- Based in: Iranian Kurdistan
- Period in office: 1933–1993
- Previous post: Leadership and founder intellectual movement school Quran: Religious leader of the Kurdistan region
- Website: http://maktabquran.org

Ahmad Moftizadeh (Kurdish: ئەحمەد موفتیزادە, romanized: Ehmed Muftîzade, Persian: احمد مفتی‌زاده; February 1933 – 9 February 1993) was an influential political and religious thinker among the Sunni Kurdish minority in Iranian Kurdistan. He is best known for his leading role in negotiating democratic freedoms for the Kurdish people in Iran during the country's Islamic Revolution. Moftizadeh led one of three major Kurdish factions during the Islamic Revolution that were demanding increased rights for Kurds in the new government. His negotiations ultimately failed and the new revolutionary authorities of the Islamic Republic of Iran ordered the arrest of Moftizadeh and several of his followers. Moftizadeh died shortly after his release from prison on 9 February 1993 due to severe torture and mistreatment by Iranian prison authorities.

== Rise to Influence ==
Ahmad Moftizadeh was a Kurdish nationalist and Islamist leader that emerged during the Shah's rule of Iran just prior to the time of the Islamic Revolution of 1979. He was widely regarded as one of the most influential Sunni personalities in Iran and rose to fame among the larger Kurdish community in Iran after being targeted by government authorities of the Shah of Iran for his demands for Kurdish autonomy.

Moftizadeh was the son of the longest serving Mufti of the Iranian Kurdistan region. Like his father, he performed his religious scholarship in neighboring Iraqi Kurdistan due to the restrictions on Sunni religious schools in Iran. His time in Iraqi Kurdistan also allowed him to learn about the Kurdish national struggle and its failings from an early age.

Throughout his teens, Moftizadeh accompanied his father on visits to the University of Tehran where his father taught courses on Islamic philosophy. After his father died, Moftizadeh chose not to assume the clerical role in the same capacity as his father, and instead, accepted a permanent role at the University of Tehran as a lecturer of Islamic studies.

During his time in Tehran, Moftizadeh developed relations with members of the outlawed Kurdistan Democratic Party of Iran and eventually became a prominent member of the organization during one of his visits back to Iranian Kurdistan. Moftizadeh regularly convened with other Kurdish activists at the Tehran home of Abdul Rahman Ilkhanizadeh, a former minister in the short-lived Kurdish Republic of Mahabad. Ilkhanizadeh, also known as Hajj Abdul Rahman Mohtadi, was the father of another prominent Kurdish leader, Abdullah Mohtadi, and had a daughter, Khadijah Mohtadi, to whom Moftizadeh would marry.

In 1964, after several months of being monitored by Iran's secret police, SAVAK, Moftizadeh was arrested and became a political prisoner for his activities in the Kurdistan Democratic Party of Iran. He spent one year in prison where he was constantly tortured before being released but the SAVAK would continue monitoring his life for a number of years. Banned from any public positions after his release, Moftizadeh used his money to open a grocery store, which he quickly converted to a homeless shelter and resumed his work in activism. After several calls from his father's followers, he decided to move back to Iranian Kurdistan with his wife Khadijah and his son, Jiyan.

Moftizadeh assumed his father's role in the Kurdish city of Sanandaj as the Friday prayer leader in the 1970s where he began to gather support among religious Kurds concerning the mistreatment of both the ethnic Kurdish and religious Sunni minority in Iran. He also drew support from religious Kurds that were dissatisfied with the current nationalist Kurdish movements in Iran through his preaching of nonviolence in response to Kurdish infighting throughout the region. His followers began calling him the “Gandhi of Islam” for his advocacy of peaceful disobedience as a means to achieve political change. Moftizadeh and some of his supporters were imprisoned by the Shah's government in 1976 when his political activities in Sanandaj became known to the local authorities but were released less than a month later. The Shah was under immense pressure to release religious figures from prison.

== Leadership during Islamic Revolution ==
By the time the Islamic Revolution swept Iran in 1978, Ahmad Moftizadeh had already developed his own faction of Kurdish followers that supported the notion of a unified Islamic and democratic state of Iran with special autonomy for the Kurdish people. In 1978, Moftizadeh founded the Maktabe Koran or the Quranic School of Thought in Sanandaj. As a leader of a large segment of people in the Kurdish city of Sanandaj, he drew opposition from communist and nationalist groups early on for supporting the notion of an Islamic state. However, despite a brief confrontation and continued heavy disagreements about the role of Kurds in the Islamic Revolution, Moftizadeh maintained a neutral relationship with other more influential nationalist factions such as the secular Kurdistan Democratic Party of Iran.

After multiple discussions with the leader of the revolution, Ayatollah Khomeini, through intermediaries, Moftizadeh was reported to have said that the "guarantee of autonomy for the Kurds is in my pocket". The new leaders of the Islamic Republic reportedly offered a number of guarantees to Moftizadeh, which included some autonomy for the Kurds, in return for his followers' support of the revolution.

== Imprisonment and torture ==
Within three years of the Islamic Revolution and just prior to military operations against Iranian Kurdistan by the new Islamic Republic of Iran, Ahmad Moftizadeh had announced that his agreements with the new government were completely violated, and that he no longer supported the Islamic State. He decided to resign from the consultative body of which he had been a member and unofficially gave up his leadership role over the Kurdish faction that he had developed. In 1983, Iranian authorities arrested Moftizadeh on the account that he was endangering national security and a court later sentenced him to 10 years in prison. The specific charges against him were never publicly announced.

While in prison, Moftizadeh reportedly suffered continuous brutal torture at the hands of authorities. Just six months after his release from prison, he died. Individuals close to Moftizadeh claimed that nearly all the bones in his body had been repeatedly broken and blamed his death on the torture and mistreatment by Iranian authorities.

After Moftizadeh's death, some of his followers including influential figures - Sabhani Naser and Farough Farsad - were arrested and killed by Iranian authorities in order to ensure that any further movement developing under Moftizadeh's faction would be exterminated.
