= Mohammad-Hadi Shadmehr =

Iranian military officer (1920–2008

Timsar Mohammad-Hadi Shadmehr
- محمدهادی شادمهر
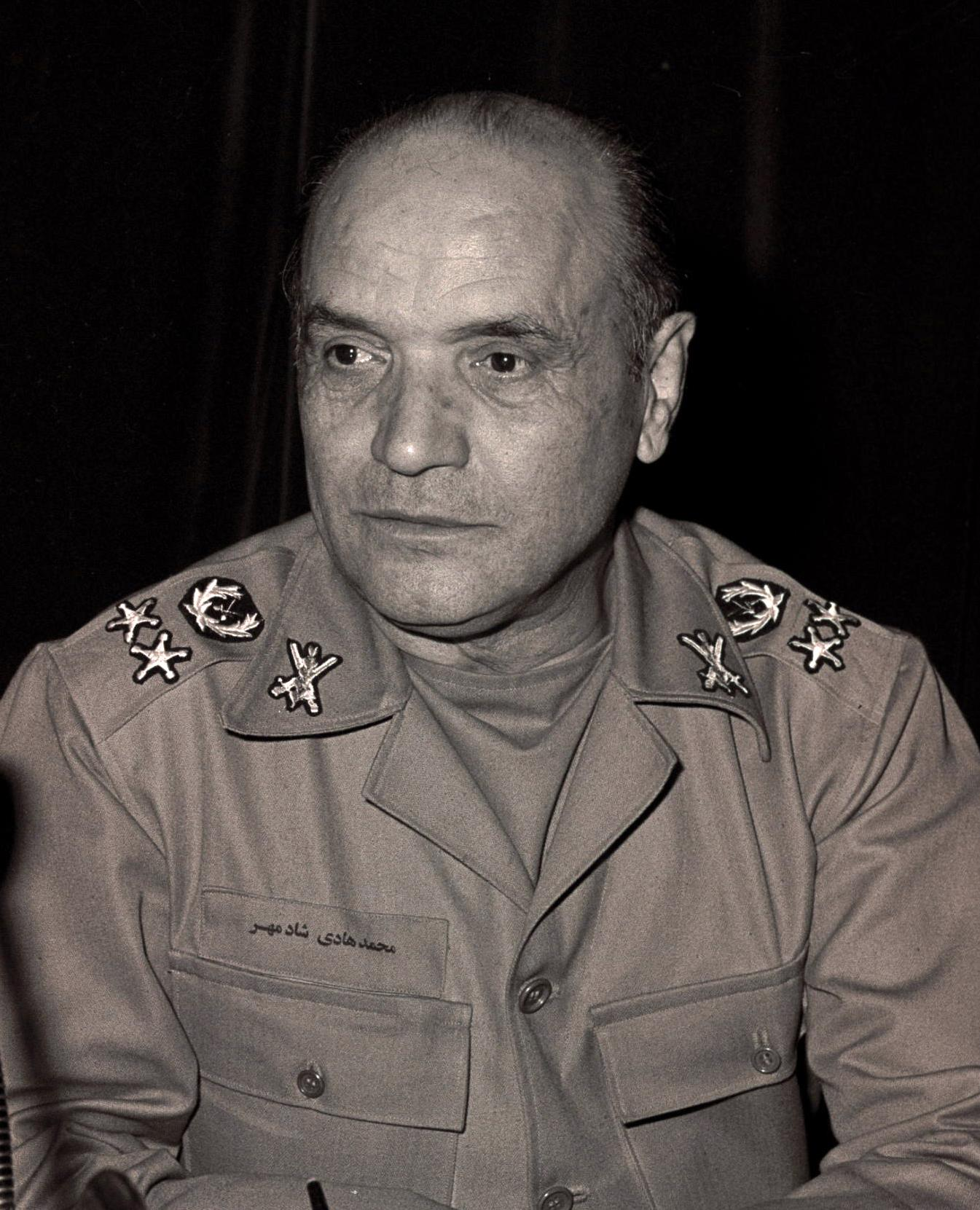
- Shadmehr in 1980
- Born: 17 May 1920; Tehran, Qajar Iran
- Died: 11 December 2008 (aged 88); Tehran, Iran
- Burial place: Behesht-e Zahra
- Education: Officers' School; University of Tehran; War University
- Military career
- Allegiance: Pahlavi Iran; Iran
- Branch: Imperial Iranian Ground Forces; Islamic Republic of Iran Ground Forces
- Service years: 1940–1967; 1979–1980
- Rank: Major General
- Commands: Chief of the Joint Staff (1979–1980); Deputy Chief of the Joint Staff (1979); 1st brigade of the Gorgan Army (1963–1967)
- Conflicts: 1979 Iranian ethnic unrest; 1979 Kurdish rebellion in Iran; 1979 Turkmen rebellion in Iran; 1979 Khuzestan insurgency; 1979 Azeri rebellion in Iran; Operation Eagle Claw

Mohammad-Hadi Shadmehr (Persian: محمدهادی شادمهر) was an Iranian military officer who served as the Chief-of-Staff of the Islamic Republic of Iran Army from 22 December 1979 until 19 June 1980. Shadmehr was appointed by then-commander-in-chief of Iran President Abolhassan Banisadr and was sacked due to "failure to stop the American incursion" in Operation Eagle Claw.

== Early life and education ==
Shadmehr was born on May 17, 1920 in Tehran, to Yaghob-Ali Noor Mohammad (father) and Shahrbanoo (mother). He attended the Military High School, Military Academy, Post Academy Excellent College, War College, and Commander's College. In addition, he attended the University of Tehran School of Law.

== Military career ==
Commander of the Military High School. 3rd in command of the Military Academy. Commander of the 1st brigade of the Gorgan Army (1963). Retired from the Imperial Iranian Army (1967). Returned from retirement as Vice Chairman of the Joint Chiefs of staff of the Islamic Republic of Iran Army (1979). Chairman of the Joint Chiefs of staff (1980). Shadmehr resigned from military service on June 19, 1980, and subsequently was appointed as military advisor to President Abolhassan Banisadr.

== Opposition to revolutionary court rulings ==
During his tenure, Shadmehr openly challenged several summary executions of military officers ordered by Sadegh Khalkhali, the head of the Islamic Revolutionary Court. Questioning the legal validity of the rulings, Shadmehr stated:

Since the Military Revolutionary Court must include judges from both the Army and the Ministry of Justice in addition to the Sharia judge, and because judges representing these two authorities were absent, the issued verdict is legally unenforceable.

== Death ==
Shadmehr died of a heart attack on 11 December 2008 at Khatam al-Anbia Hospital in Tehran. His body was officially repatriated in a military funeral procession attended by contemporary Iranian military officials and veterans, starting from his residence on Palestine Street, and was buried in Behesht-e Zahra cemetery

Military offices
Preceded by Mohammad-Hossein Shaker	Chief of the Joint Staff of the Islamic Republic of Iran Army; 22 December 1979–19 June 1980	Succeeded by Valiollah Fallahi
Preceded by Houshang Hatem	Deputy Chief of the Joint Staff of the Islamic Republic of Iran Army; 20 February 1979–22 December 1979	Succeeded by Reza Amin-Dari
Preceded by ?	1st brigade of the Gorgan Army; 1963–1967	Succeeded by ?
