= Gholam Reza Azhari =

Iranian prime minister and army officer (1912–2001)

Timsar Gholam Reza Azhari
- غلامرضا ازهاری
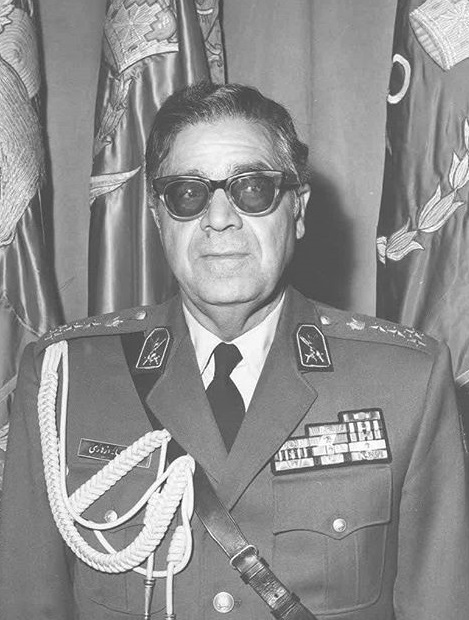
- Azhari in 1977

39th Prime Minister of Iran
- In office 6 November 1978 – 6 January 1979
- Monarch: Mohammad Reza Pahlavi
- Preceded by: Jafar Sharif-Emami
- Succeeded by: Shapour Bakhtiar

Chief of the Joint Staff
- In office 19 July 1971 – 22 December 1978
- Monarch: Mohammad Reza Pahlavi
- Prime Minister: Amir-Abbas Hoveyda; Jamshid Amouzegar; Jafar Sharif-Emami
- Preceded by: Fereydoun Djam
- Succeeded by: Abbas Gharabaghi

Deputy Chief of the Joint Staff
- In office 1969 – 19 July 1971
- Monarch: Mohammad Reza Pahlavi
- Prime Minister: Amir-Abbas Hoveyda

Iran's military representative to the Central Treaty Organization (CENTO)
- In office 1967–1969
- Monarch: Mohammad Reza Pahlavi
- Prime Minister: Amir-Abbas Hoveyda

Commandant of the War College
- In office 1959–1962
- Monarch: Mohammad Reza Pahlavi
- Prime Minister: Manouchehr Eghbal; Jafar Sharif-Emami; Ali Amini; Asadollah Alam
- Preceded by: ?
- Succeeded by: Abbas Gharabaghi

Personal details
- Born: 18 February 1912 Shiraz, Sublime State of Persia
- Died: 5 November 2001 (aged 89) McLean, Virginia, United States of America
- Education: National War College

Military service
- Allegiance: Pahlavi Iran
- Branch/service: Imperial Iranian Ground Force
- Years of service: 1933–1979
- Rank: General
- Commands: Western Corps of Kermanshah (1964–1967); Sabzevar Division (1958–1959); 11th Infantry Division of Kerman (1957–1958); Deputy Commander of the Central Military Police (1947–?)
- Battles/wars: World War II; Anglo-Soviet invasion of Iran; Iran crisis of 1946; Siahkal incident; Seizure of Abu Musa and the Greater and Lesser Tunbs; Dhofar rebellion; Second Iraqi–Kurdish War; 1974–1975 Shatt al-Arab conflict; Iranian Revolution

Gholam Reza Azhari (Persian: غلامرضا ازهاری; 18 February 1912 – 5 November 2001) was an Iranian military officer who served as the 39th and penultimate Prime Minister of Iran and 19th Chief of the Joint staff under the reign of Mohammad Reza Pahlavi.

== Early life and education ==
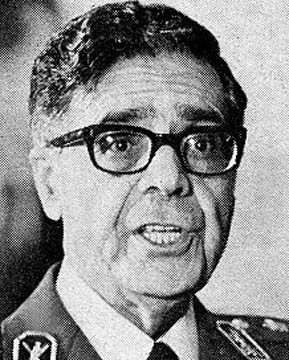
Azhari in 1978

Gholam Reza Azhari was born in Shiraz in 1912 (or in 1917, according to some sources).

After completing his primary and secondary education, Azhari entered the Officers' Academy in 1933. Two years later, he graduated with the rank of Second Lieutenant and joined the Imperial Iranian Army. In 1947, after being promoted to Colonel, he was appointed Deputy Commander of the Central Military Police.

He was a graduate of Iran's war college and was also trained at the National War College in Washington in the 1950s.

== Career ==
Azhari commanded the 11th Infantry Division of Kerman from 1957–1958 and later commanded the Sabzevar Division from 1958–1959; Two years afterward, he became commandant of the war college. In 1964 he Commanded the "Western Corps" or First Army at Kermanshah until 1967, the unit would later to be also commanded by Abbas Gharabaghi.

In 1967, Azhari became Iran's Military Representative to the Central Treaty Organization (CENTO). Beginning in 1969, he served for two years as Deputy Chief of the Joint Staff, He was appointed chief of the joint staff of Iran's armed forces in 1971 and his tenure lasted until 1978. He served as interim prime minister of a military government until a civilian government could be chosen. He served as prime minister from 6 November 1978 to 31 December 1978. He formed the first military government in Iran since 1953.

On 21 December 1978, Azhari, then the prime minister, told U.S. Ambassador to Iran William Sullivan that, "You must know this and you must tell it to your government. This country is lost because the Shah cannot make up his mind." Azhari left office on 2 January 1979 after reportedly having a heart attack. He was succeeded by Abbas Gharabaghi as the chief of the army staff. Shapour Bakhtiar succeeded Azhari as prime minister. On 18 February 1979 Azhari was retired from the army in absentia.

== Cabinet ==
His cabinet was composed of nine members:

- General Gholam Ali Oveissi, Military governor of Tehran (Labour and social affairs (acting)),
- Lieutenant General Nasser Moghaddam, head of the Security Police (Energy),
- General Abbas Gharabaghi (Interior),
- Lieutenant General Abolhassan Sadatmand (Housing and development),
- General Reza Azimi (Defense)
- Amir Khosrow Afshar (Foreign affairs),
- Mohammad-Reza Amin (Mines and industry),
- Karim Motamedi (Posts and telecommunications)
- Admiral Kamal Habibollahi (Education and Culture & Art)

However, it is also reported that the government was of eleven men and six of them were military officers.

== Honours ==
- U.S. Legion of Merit

== Rank ==
Third Lieutenant	Second Lieutenant	First Lieutenant	Captain	Major
1933	1935	1937	1939	1942
22	24	26	28	31

Lieutenant Colonel	Colonel	Brigadier General	Major General	Lieutenant General	General
1945	1947	1957	1959	1963	1969
34	36	46	48	52	58

== Later years and death ==
Azhari suffered a heart attack while serving as prime minister. After leaving office he went to the US in January 1979 for heart surgery at Bethesda Naval Hospital. After surgery he did not return to Iran and settled in McLean, Virginia. In the immediate aftermath of the revolution, Ayatollah Sadegh Khalkhali, a religious judge and then chairman of the Revolutionary Court, informed the press that the death sentence was passed on the members of the Pahlavi dynasty and the Shah's former officials, including Azhari.

He died of cancer in McLean, Virginia, in the U.S. on 5 November 2001.

== See also ==
- List of prime ministers of Iran

== Sources ==
- 'Alí Rizā Awsatí (عليرضا اوسطى), Iran in the Past Three Centuries (Irān dar Se Qarn-e Goz̲ashteh - ايران در سه قرن گذشته), Volumes 1 and 2 (Paktāb Publishing - انتشارات پاکتاب, Tehran, Iran, 2003). ISBN 964-93406-6-1 (Vol. 1), ISBN 964-93406-5-3 (Vol. 2).

Military offices
Preceded by ?	Deputy Commander of the Central Military Police; 1947–?	Succeeded by ?
Preceded by ?	Commander of the 11th Kerman Infantry Division; 1957–1958	Succeeded by ?
Preceded by ?	Commander of the Sabzevar Division; 1958–1959	Succeeded by ?
Preceded by ?	Commandant of the War College; 1959–1962	Succeeded by Abbas Gharabaghi
Preceded by ?	Commander of the Western Corps of Kermanshah; 1964–1967	Succeeded by ?
Preceded by ?	Iran's military representative to the Central Treaty Organization (CENTO); 1967–1969	Succeeded by ?
Preceded by Fereydoun Djam	Deputy Chief of the Joint Staff of the Imperial Iranian Armed Forces; 4 May 1969–19 July 1971	Succeeded by ?
Preceded by Fereydoun Djam	Chief of the Joint Staff of the Imperial Iranian Armed Forces; 19 July 1971–22 December 1978	Succeeded by Abbas Gharabaghi
Political offices
Preceded by Jafar Sharif-Emami	Prime Minister of Iran; 6 November 1978–6 January 1979	Succeeded by Shapour Bakhtiar
