= Madrasa Nezam =

Military academy in Shah's Garden, Tehran

Madrasa Nezam or Madrese-ye Nezām (Persian: مدرسه نظام) was a military academy located in Shah's Garden (now Hor Square), Tehran. The academy was founded by Maj. Gen. Mohammed Nakhchivan. Notable students include Mohammad Reza Pahlavi and Hossein Fardoust.
