= List of Chiefs of Staff of the Islamic Republic of Iran Army =

The following individuals have been identified as chiefs of staffs of the:

- Imperial Iranian Armed Forces (until 1979)
- Islamic Republic of Iran Army (after 1979), one of the two military forces of the Iranian Armed Forces.

In 1998 the title became Commander-in-Chief.

== Chiefs of the Joint Staff ==
No.	Portrait	Chief of the Joint Staff	Took office	Left office	Time in office	Defence branch	Ref.
Imperial Iranian Armed Forces
1	Amanullah Jahanbani	Lieutenant general Amanullah Jahanbani (1895–1974)	6 December 1921	12 February 1927	5 years, 68 days	Ground Force	–
2	Habibollah Sheibani [fa]	Brigadier general Habibollah Sheibani	12 February 1927	30 November 1927	291 days	Ground Force	–
3	Mohammad Nakhjavan [fa]	Brigadier general Mohammad Nakhjavan (?–1975)	30 November 1927	3 May 1934	6 years, 154 days	Ground Force	–
4	Azizollah Zarghami	Major general Azizollah Zarghami (1884–1978)	3 May 1934	23 September 1941	7 years, 143 days	Ground Force	–
5	Morteza Yazdanpanah	Major general Morteza Yazdanpanah (1888–1970)	23 September 1941	3 March 1943	1 year, 161 days	Ground Force	–
6	Hasan Arfa	Brigadier general Hasan Arfa (1895–1984)	3 March 1943	23 July 1943	142 days	Ground Force	–
7	Ali Razmara	Brigadier general Ali Razmara (1901–1951)	23 July 1943	9 September 1943	48 days	Ground Force	–
8	Ali Riazi [fa]	Brigadier general Ali Riazi	9 September 1943	5 May 1944	239 days	Ground Force	–
(7)	Ali Razmara	Major general Ali Razmara (1901–1951)	5 May 1944	27 December 1944	236 days	Ground Force	–
(6)	Hasan Arfa	Major general Hasan Arfa (1895–1984)	27 December 1944	16 February 1946	1 year, 51 days	Ground Force	–
9	Farajollah Aghevli [fa]	Major general Farajollah Aghevli (1887–1974)	16 February 1946	1 July 1946	135 days	Ground Force	–
(7)	Ali Razmara	Lieutenant general Ali Razmara (1901–1951)	1 July 1946	26 June 1950	3 years, 360 days	Ground Force	–
10	Abbas Garzan [fa]	Major general Abbas Garzan	26 June 1950	24 July 1952	2 years, 28 days	Ground Force	–
(5)	Morteza Yazdanpanah	Lieutenant general Morteza Yazdanpanah (1888–1970)	24 July 1952	21 August 1952	28 days	Ground Force	–
11	Mahmoud Baharmast	Major general Mahmoud Baharmast (1899–1977)	21 August 1952	28 February 1953	191 days	Ground Force	–
12	Taghi Riahi	Brigadier general Taghi Riahi (1911–1989)	28 February 1953	19 August 1953	172 days	Ground Force	–
13	Nader Batmanghelidj	Major general Nader Batmanghelidj (1904–1998)	19 August 1953	23 August 1955	2 years, 4 days	Ground Force	–
14	Abdollah Hedayat	General; Abdollah Hedayat (1899–1968)	23 August 1955	15 March 1961	5 years, 204 days	Ground Force	–
15	Abdol Hossein Hejazi	General; Abdol Hossein Hejazi (1904–1969)	15 March 1961	21 December 1965	4 years, 281 days	Ground Force	–
16	Bahram Aryana	General; Bahram Aryana (1906–1985)	21 December 1965	4 May 1969	3 years, 134 days	Ground Force	–
17	Fereydoun Djam	General; Fereydoun Djam (1914–2008)	4 May 1969	19 July 1971	2 years, 76 days	Ground Force	–
19	Gholam Reza Azhari	General; Gholam Reza Azhari (1912–2001)	19 July 1971	22 December 1978	7 years, 156 days	Ground Force	–
20	Abbas Gharabaghi	General; Abbas Gharabaghi (1918–2000)	22 December 1978	11 February 1979	51 days	Ground Force	–
Islamic Republic of Iran Army
1	Mohammad-Vali Gharani	Major general Mohammad-Vali Gharani (1913–1979)	12 February 1979	27 March 1979	43 days	Ground Forces	
2	Nasser Farbod	Major general Nasser Farbod (1922–2019)	27 March 1979	21 July 1979	116 days	Ground Forces	
3	Mohammad-Hossein Shaker	Major general Mohammad-Hossein Shaker (born 1928)	21 July 1979	22 December 1979	154 days	Ground Forces	
4	Mohammad-Hadi Shadmehr	Major general Mohammad-Hadi Shadmehr (1920–2008)	22 December 1979	19 June 1980	180 days	Ground Forces	
5	Valiollah Fallahi	Brigadier general Valiollah Fallahi (1931–1981)	19 June 1980	29 September 1981 †	1 year, 102 days	Ground Forces	
6	Qasem-Ali Zahirnejad	Brigadier general Qasem-Ali Zahirnejad (1924–1999)	1 October 1981	25 October 1984	3 years, 24 days	Ground Forces	
7	Esmaeil Sohrabi	Brigadier general Esmaeil Sohrabi (born 1938)	25 October 1984	3 May 1988	3 years, 191 days	Ground Forces	
8	Ali Shahbazi	Major general Ali Shahbazi (born 1946)	7 May 1988	30 September 1998	10 years, 146 days	Ground Forces	

== Commanders-in-chief ==
No.	Portrait	Commander-in-Chief	Took office	Left office	Time in office	Defence branch	Ref.
1	Ali Shahbazi	Major general Ali Shahbazi (born 1946)	30 September 1998	21 May 2000	1 year, 234 days	Ground Forces	
2	Mohammad Salimi	Major general Mohammad Salimi (1937–2016)	21 May 2000	11 September 2005	5 years, 113 days	Ground Forces	
3	Ataollah Salehi	Major general Ataollah Salehi (born 1950)	11 September 2005	21 August 2017	11 years, 344 days	Ground Forces	
4	Abdolrahim Mousavi	Major general Abdolrahim Mousavi (1960–2026)	21 August 2017	13 June 2025	7 years, 296 days	Ground Forces	
5	Amir Hatami	Major general Amir Hatami (born 1966)	14 June 2025	Incumbent	1 year, 133 days	Ground Forces	

== Deputy commanders-in-chief ==
No.	Portrait	Commander-in-Chief	Took office	Left office	Time in office	Defence branch	Ref.
1	Nasser Arasteh [fa]	Brigadier general Nasser Arasteh (born 1952)	30 September 1998	25 June 2000	1 year, 269 days	Ground Forces	_
2	Mostafa Torabipour [fa]	Brigadier general Mostafa Torabipour	25 June 2000	27 May 2001	335 days	Ground Forces	_
3	Habib Baghaei	Brigadier general Habib Baghaei (born 1950)	27 May 2001	26 September 2005	4 years, 152 days	Air Force	_
4	Mohammad-Reza Gharaei Ashtiani	Brigadier general Mohammad-Reza Gharaei Ashtiani (born 1960)	26 September 2005	25 August 2008	2 years, 334 days	Ground Forces	_
5	Abdolrahim Mousavi	Brigadier general Abdolrahim Mousavi (1960–2026)	25 August 2008	19 November 2016	11 years, 86 days	Ground Forces	_
6	Ahmad Reza Pourdastan	Brigadier general Ahmad Reza Pourdastan (born 1961)	19 November 2016	5 November 2017	351 days	Ground Forces	_
7	Mohammad-Hossein Dadras	Brigadier general Mohammad-Hossein Dadras	5 November 2017	Incumbent	8 years, 354 days	Ground Forces	_

== See also ==
- List of commanders of the Islamic Revolutionary Guard Corps
