= AJA University of Command and Staff =

Staff college in Tehran, Iran

Coordinates: 35.6918°N 51.3853°E

- دانشگاه فرماندهی و ستاد آجا
- Seal of the University
- Former name: War University
- Type: Military Academy
- Established: 1935 as War University; 1990 as current Institution
- Affiliations: Joint Staff of the Islamic Republic of Iran Army
- Commandant: Brigadier general Farzad Esmaili
- Location: Tehran, Iran

AJA University of Command and Staff (Persian: دانشگاه فرماندهی و ستاد آجا; acronym: دافوس, DĀFOOS), formerly named War University (Persian: دانشگاه جنگ) is the staff college of Islamic Republic of Iran Army (Artesh), located in Tehran. The academy is a subdivision of Joint Staff of Islamic Republic of Iran Army and offers Masters of Military Art and Science courses to personnel of all four military branches of Artesh with the rank of Major and higher. The university also provides courses for foreign officers of countries with a close relationship with Iran.

At the beginning of the Iran-Iraq War the university briefly closed to be opened later on again.

== See also ==
- IRGC University of Command and Staff
