= Anti-Sabotage Joint Committee =

Security service in Shah-era Iran

The Anti-Sabotage Joint Committee (Persian: کمیته مشترک ضدخرابکاری, Komite-ye Moshtarak-e Zed-e Kharabkari, or simply Joint Committee) was a high-level security body during the reign of Mohammad Reza Pahlavi. It was established on January 25, 1972, to coordinate the activities of various security and law enforcement agencies in combating armed groups and leftist organizations opposed to the monarchy. The committee operated its own detention facility, known as the "Anti-Sabotage Joint Committee Prison."

According to historian Ervand Abrahamian, the Joint Committee and Towhid Prison gained 'sinister notoriety' during the 1970s as a major interrogation centre in Tehran. Managed jointly by SAVAK and the police, the organization became synonymous with 'state terror' by the mid-1970s. While its functional goal was to coordinate security services against armed groups like the Mujahedin-e Khalq and Fadaiyan-e-Khalq, its methods, including torture, led to its reputation as a primary site for political repression.

== History ==
=== Background ===
During this period, the Shah's regime faced threats from Islamist and Marxist militant groups that carried out assassinations of high-ranking officials, kidnappings, bank robberies, and bombings in public places, including cinemas. To counter these threats, SAVAK was granted extraordinary powers. While the agency achieved tangible results, it employed harsh and ruthless methods that were often perceived as human rights violations.

Prior to the emergence of a unified coordinating body, the struggle against anti-government activities was fragmented. In November 1970, at the initiative of Lieutenant General Nasser Moghadam, head of SAVAK's Third Department, a special committee was formed. Initially tasked with investigating university unrest, the committee eventually expanded beyond its original mission. Its mandate grew to include identifying armed groups, and the General Directorate of the Third Department tasked the committee with identifying the primary organizers of student movements.

In 1971, parallel anti-sabotage committees were established: one in Evin Prison under the leadership of Manouchehr Houshang Azgandi, and a similar structure within the city police headed by Hassan Khata'i. The uncoordinated operations of these bodies and their inter-agency competition created significant operational difficulties, demonstrating the need to pool resources. During the same period, SAVAK formed a special task force within the Third Department to specifically monitor the activities of the Mujahedin-e Khalq. The data collected allowed for an operation in September 1971 to prevent planned protests during the 2,500-year celebration of the Persian Empire, resulting in the detention of several key members of the organization. However, these measures underscored the acute need for closer coordination between departments, as fragmented actions complicated field operations.

During the operation, the leaders and founders of the organization were arrested, safe houses were identified, and numerous internal documents, weapons, and ammunition were seized. Nevertheless, the crackdown on armed groups such as the Mujahedin-e Khalq and Fada'iyan-e Khalq did not completely halt their activities. Remaining members launched retaliatory actions: they attempted to kidnap Prince Shahram (son of Princess Ashraf Pahlavi), carried out several bank robberies, and attacked the Gholhak police station in Tehran, as well as the fifth station in Tabriz. These attacks resulted in the deaths of several police officers, while others were disarmed. To apprehend the perpetrators, the police formed special task forces.

In 1971, work began in Iran to create a specialized inter-agency structure aimed at increasing coordination efficiency and ensuring the continuity of operations against armed anti-government groups. Previously, various security agencies—the city police, SAVAK, military counterintelligence, and the Gendarmerie—had operated independently. This fragmentation often led to a lack of coordination, conflicts, and mutual recriminations over operational failures. Each agency sought to claim credit for successful missions while blaming failures on the interference of other structures, which undermined both the effectiveness of their work and the motivation of their personnel.

=== Establishment and activities ===
On January 25, 1972, by the Shah's decree, the "Anti-Sabotage Joint Committee" was officially established. The leadership of the committee was entrusted to a representative from the SAVAK headquarters, and all key reports were to be submitted personally to the Shah as official SAVAK documents. The new body included representatives from SAVAK's Third Department, the second directorates of the Army, the city police, and the Gendarmerie. All previously existing fragmented committees were abolished, and their personnel and operational materials were transferred to the Joint Committee. The committee was established with two primary objectives: to strengthen counter-terrorism efforts within the national security system and, simultaneously, to identify and address its deficiencies and potential malfunctions.

From 1972, the committee—which included representatives from military intelligence, counterintelligence, and the gendarmerie to coordinate actions—turned its detention center into the primary site for the holding and interrogation of revolutionaries. According to SAVAK's own data, thousands of political activists were arrested by the committee between 1971 and 1979. Certain interrogators received training in Israel and the United States, which also provided specialized interrogation equipment.

The creation of this committee was a key step in strengthening cooperation between security agencies and ensuring centralized control over state security measures during the tense operational environment of the early 1970s. The committee's activities were conducted within the framework of existing legislation and administrative procedures. In 1978–1979, its budget was approximately 3.3 million US dollars, allocated from the Prime Minister's budget and approved by the authorities and the Shah without delay.

In November–December 1970, the country's Security Council decided to eliminate the fragmentation between operational groups and prevent potential clashes by creating a single structure to coordinate the actions of intelligence and counterintelligence agencies. Two SAVAK committees operating in Evin Prison—one tasked with identifying the organizers of the 1970 student protests and communist groups, and another responsible for the arrest of members of the religious organization Mujahedin-e Khalq and related structures—were disbanded. All operational materials were handed over to the new committee, and the staff of the former committees joined the new structure. It also included representatives from the intelligence and counterintelligence branches of the city police, the army, the gendarmerie, and SAVAK's Third Department.

Following this, all organizations involved in the struggle against opposition forces were abolished, and their personnel were transferred to the Joint Committee, along with the transfer of all operational information to the new structure. The primary role in the committee's work was played by SAVAK's Third Department, most of whose employees underwent specialized training courses. Under the guidance of Iranian and Israeli instructors, they refined their skills in surveillance, anti-sabotage operations, and interrogation, accumulating practical experience.

In June 1973, the Shah approved the reorganization of the committee, resulting in its final organizational structure. The committee was divided into three specialized units, corresponding to the levels of SAVAK directorates: Intelligence (Information), involved in the collection and analysis of operational data; Executive (Operational), responsible for surveillance and carrying out arrests; and Support (Supply Department), which provided technical equipment, transport, financing, and logistical needs. To perform these functions, the committee was allocated 375 permanent and 188 temporary staff positions; one-third of the personnel consisted of SAVAK employees, while the remaining two-thirds were officers, non-commissioned officers, and enlisted men of the city police.

The primary leadership role in the Joint Committee was held by the General Directorate of the Third Department, and the majority of the committee's staff were representatives of this structure. Agents were trained under the guidance of Iranian and Israeli instructors, ensuring a high level of professional training in areas such as surveillance, interrogation, and counter-sabotage. The first chairman of the committee was Lieutenant General Jafar Gholi Sadri, who was concurrently the acting head of the city police; his deputy was Brigadier General Fazlollah Jafari, the head of police intelligence, and the chief of staff was Parviz Sabeti. Later, the committee was headed by Brigadier General Reza Zandipour, who was assassinated by Mujahedin-e Khalq militants on March 17, 1975, followed by Brigadier General Ali Asghar Vadiee and Brigadier General Jalal Sajdei.

=== Abolition ===
In 1978, against the backdrop of intensifying public protests and harsh media criticism of SAVAK, the government was forced to initiate a reorganization of the notorious security service. In a move to demonstrate decisive action, the Minister of Justice was urgently tasked with drafting and submitting a bill to parliament for the organization's structural reform. Simultaneously, in an attempt to alleviate public tension and pacify the protesting masses, the authorities sanctioned the arrest of the head of SAVAK, General Nematollah Nassiri, holding him personally responsible for the agency's activities. Following the overthrow of the Pahlavi regime in the Iranian revolution, SAVAK and other special services of the monarchy were abolished.

== Use of torture ==
After the creation of the Joint Committee, the interrogations of opponents and political activists, which had been conducted since the 1960s, became more intense. A significant portion of the equipment for the committee's work was supplied by foreign intelligence services, including Mossad and the CIA.

The committee's detention facility gained notoriety for the systematic use of torture: prisoners were suspended, beaten with cables and batons, subjected to electric shocks using a device known as the "Apollo," kept in handcuffs, and subjected to thermal torture—burns from lighters or candles, as well as being placed in heated cages or chairs. The facility's courtyard was surrounded by special S-shaped gratings designed to prevent suicide attempts. After the investigation was completed, prisoners were transferred to Qasr Prison, Evin Prison, and other institutions.

Official interrogation protocols from that period contained no mention of such methods, a fact confirmed by comparative analysis of documents and witness testimonies. The most widespread and systematic use of these practices was noted between 1972 and 1976. Numerous testimonies from former prisoners, including over 200 documented interviews, contain consistent and complementary descriptions of these methods. Opposition forces claimed that the committee's activities were accompanied by the brutal torture of hundreds of political prisoners. The first analysis of the interrogation system used by the anti-terrorist committee was published in one of Iran's leftist newspapers.

Among the well-known interrogators and committee staff involved in interrogations and torture were Nasser Nozari (Rasouli), Mohammad Ali Sha'bani (Hosseini), and others. Many political prisoners passed through the detention center, including Ayatollah Ali Khamenei, Dr. Ali Shariati, Massoud Rajavi, and other prominent figures. Some prisoners, such as Amir Morad Nankali and Hossein Kermanshahi Asl, died as a result of the torture inflicted upon them.

== See also ==
- Siahkal incident
- Parviz Sabeti
- Towhid Prison

== Bibliography ==
- Irnberger, Harald (1977). SAVAK: Oder, Der Folterfreund des Westens: aus d. Akten d. iran. Geheimdienstes [SAVAK: Or, The Torture-Friend of the West: From the Files of the Iranian Secret Service] (in German). Reinbek bei Hamburg: Rowohlt. p. 116. ISBN 978-3499141829.
- Najari Rad, Taqi (2000). ساواک و نقش آن در تحولات داخلی رژیم پهلوی [SAVAK and Its Role in the Domestic Developments of the Pahlavi Regime] (in Persian). Tehran: Markaz-e Asnad-e Enqelab-e Eslami. p. 264. ISBN 978-964-6196-62-9.
- Abrahamian, Ervand (1992). Radical Islam: The Iranian Mojahedin. New Haven: Yale University Press. p. 315. ISBN 978-0300052671.
- Salimi, Heshmatollah (2008). شکنجه به روایت شکنجه‌گران ساواک [Torture as Told by SAVAK Torturers] (in Persian). Tehran: Center for Islamic Revolution Documents. p. 352. ISBN 978-9644193286.
- Plate, Thomas Gordon (1981). Secret Police: The Inside Story of a Network of Terror. Garden City, N.Y.: Doubleday. p. 458. ISBN 978-0385171564.
- Burke, Andrew; Elliott, Mark (2004). Iran (Lonely Planet). Lonely Planet Publications. p. 408. ISBN 978-1740594257.
- Center for Historical Documents (2002). Collected Articles from the Contemporary History Documents Conference (in Persian). Vol. 1. Tehran: Center for Historical Documents. p. 348.
- Ahmadi, Mohammadreza (2002). Memoirs of Ayatollah Mohammad Ali Gerami (in Persian). Center for Islamic Revolution Documents. p. 476. ISBN 978-9647357890.
- PSRI (2021). "Revisiting the Case of the Anti-Sabotage Joint Committee" (in Persian). Political Studies and Research Institute.
