= Hassan Alavikia =

Iranian general and businessman (1910-2013)

Timsar Hassan Alavikia
- حسن علوی‌کیا
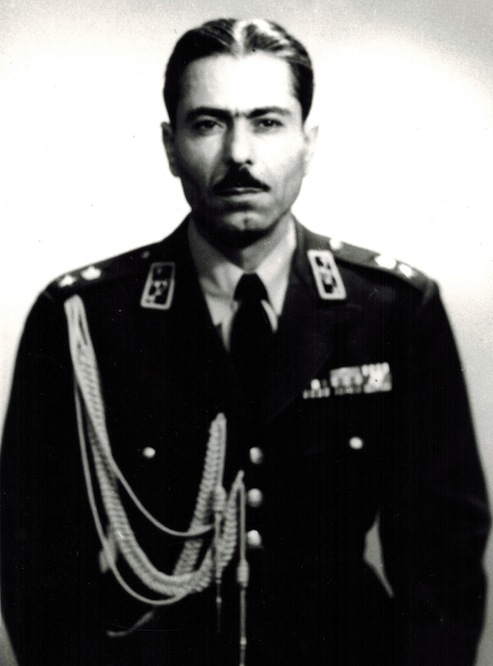
- Alavikia in 1957

head of the European Operations Division of the SAVAK
- In office 19 November 1962 – 6 June 1967
- Monarch: Mohammad Reza Pahlavi
- Prime Minister: Asadollah Alam; Hassan Ali Mansur; Amir-Abbas Hoveyda

Deputy Director of SAVAK
- In office 12 March 1957 – 19 November 1962
- Monarch: Mohammad Reza Pahlavi
- Prime Minister: Hossein Ala'; Manouchehr Eghbal; Jafar Sharif-Emami; Ali Amini; Asadollah Alam
- Preceded by: Office Established
- Succeeded by: Hossein Fardoust

Deputy Director of the Second Bureau
- In office 1949–1951
- Monarch: Mohammad Reza Pahlavi
- Prime Minister: Mohammad Sa'ed; Ali Mansur; Ali Razmara

Personal details
- Born: 1 December 1910 Hamadan, Qajar Iran
- Died: 20 April 2013 (aged 102) La Jolla, California, United States
- Spouse: Jila Pourrastegar (1956–2013, his death)
- Children: 3
- Education: Military Academy; University of Tehran; Harvard University

Military service
- Allegiance: Pahlavi Iran
- Branch/service: Ground Forces
- Years of service: 1932–1967
- Rank: Lieutenant General
- Battles/wars: World War II; Anglo-Soviet invasion of Iran; Iran crisis of 1946

Hassan Alavikia (Persian: حسن علوی‌کیا, [hæsæn ælævikiːɒː]; 1 December 1910 – 20 April 2013) was an Iranian military officer and intelligence chief, who along with Teymur Bakhtiar and Hassan Pakravan, co-founded the SAVAK, the intelligence agency of Iran during the Pahlavi era.

== Early life ==
Hassan Alavikia was born on 1 December 1910 in Hamadan, Iran, the son of Abu Torab Alavikia, a wealthy land owner. He completed his primary and secondary education at the Lycée St. Louis in Isfahan and Tehran. In 1932, he entered Tehran Military Academy, from which he graduated as a lieutenant in 1934. He continued his academic education at the University of Tehran and Harvard University, graduating with degrees in judicial law and philosophy. He spoke fluent Persian, French, English, and German.

== Political life ==
He served in the Iranian Army as deputy director of the Intelligence Department of the Army (1949–1951). In 1957, he left the Second Bureau, and became the first deputy director of the SAVAK (1957–1962) with Lieutenant General Teymur Bakhtiar as its first director.

In 1962, he was appointed as head of the European Operations Division of the SAVAK (1962–1967) by the Shah, which at the time was headquartered in Cologne, West Germany. He retired from the military in 1967, and continued his professional career with the establishment of several successful businesses in both the agricultural and real estate industries.

== Later years ==
In January 1979, he and his wife left Iran to visit their daughters in Paris, France where they were studying; however, due to the turmoil and start of the Iranian Revolution, they were unable to return to Iran. He spent the remainder of his life in exile in Paris, France and Del Mar, California, where his three daughters and their families resided.

== Family ==
On 6 December 1956, General Alavikia married Jila Pourrastegar, the daughter of Hossein Pourrastegar, a well-known Colonel in the Persian Cossack Brigade under Reza Shah. They had three children together.

== Death ==
He died on 20 April 2013 in La Jolla, California, surrounded by his wife, three children, and five grandchildren.
