= Ali Motazed =

Iranian general

Timsar Ali Motazed
- علی معتضد
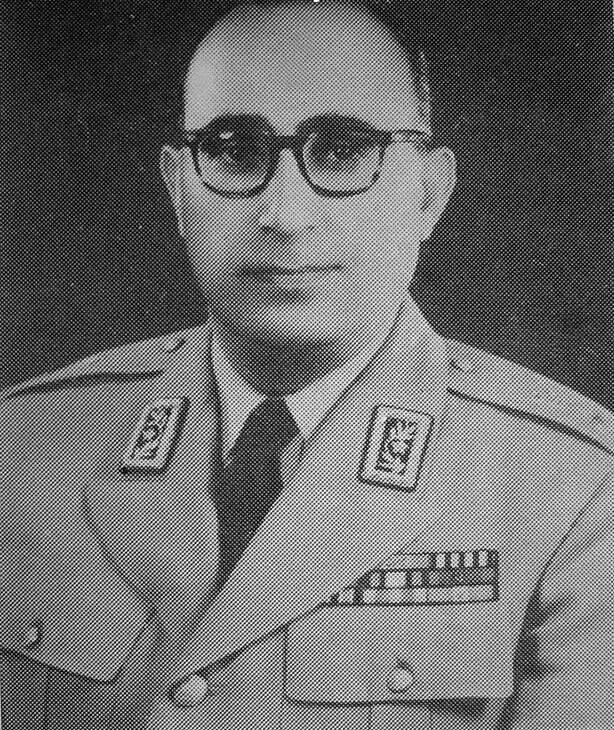
- General Motazed, c. 1970s

Ambassadors of Iran to Syria
- In office 6 June 1978 – 11 February 1979
- Monarch: Mohammad Reza Pahlavi
- Prime Minister: Jamshid Amouzegar; Jafar Sharif-Emami; Gholam Reza Azhari; Shapour Bakhtiar
- Preceded by: Mohammad Poursartip
- Succeeded by: Ebrahim Ghaleh-Beigi

Deputy Director of SAVAK
- In office 19 April 1973 – 6 June 1978
- Monarch: Mohammad Reza Pahlavi
- Prime Minister: Amir-Abbas Hoveyda; Jamshid Amouzegar
- Preceded by: Nasser Moghaddam
- Succeeded by: Parviz Sabeti

Director of the Second General Directorate of SAVAK
- In office August 1961 – October 1962
- Monarch: Mohammad Reza Pahlavi
- Prime Minister: Ali Amini; Asadollah Alam
- Preceded by: Mohammad Ali Ansari
- Succeeded by: Mansour Ghadr

Personal details
- Born: Ali Nakhjiri Esfahani; 24 February 1913 Isfahan, Qajar Iran
- Died: 4 February 2001 (aged 87) London, United Kingdom
- Education: Iranian Military Academy

Military service
- Allegiance: Pahlavi Iran
- Branch/service: Ground Forces
- Years of service: 1934–1979
- Rank: Major General

Ali Motazed (Persian: علی معتضد), also known as Ali Nakhjiri Esfahani (Persian: علی نخجیری اصفهانی), was the Deputy head of SAVAK during the reign of Mohammad Reza Pahlavi.

Ali Motazed spent his primary and secondary school years in Isfahan and Nezam High School. In 1934, he entered the officer's college and in 1937, he graduated with the rank of second lieutenant in the field of Artillery. Motazed served in the army headquarters until Pakravan took over as the Director of SAVAK, after which he was assigned to SAVAK and became the head of SAVAK's foreign intelligence service. He remained in this position from August 1961 until October 1962. On June 6, 1978, when Nematollah Nassiri was replaced with Nasser Moghaddam, he resigned from the position of SAVAK deputy and was sent to Syria as an ambassador.

== Sources ==
- Major General Ali Motazed
- Biography of SAVAK leaders
