= Sabeti =

Sabeti is a surname of Persian origin. Notable people with the surname include:

- Mehdi Sabeti (born 1975), Iranian football player
- Pardis Sabeti (born 1975), Iranian American scientist
- Parviz Sabeti (born 1936), Iranian jurist
