= Nasser Moghaddam =

Iranian military officer 1921–1979

Timsar Nasser Moghaddam
- ناصر مقدم
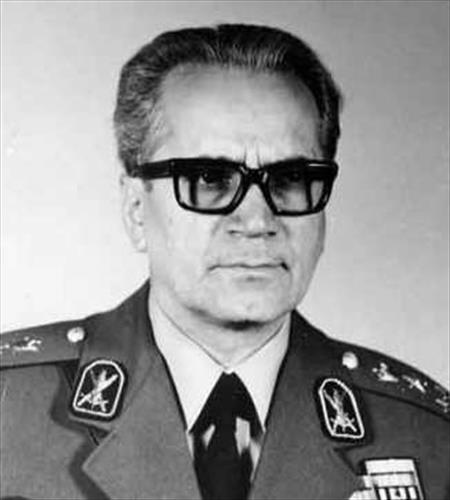
- General Moghaddam, c. 1970s

Director of SAVAK
- In office 7 June 1978 – 12 February 1979; Leave of absence: 13 January 1979 – 11 February 1979
- Monarch: Mohammad Reza Pahlavi
- Prime Minister: Jamshid Amouzegar; Jafar Sharif-Emami; Gholam Reza Azhari; Shapour Bakhtiar
- Preceded by: Nematollah Nassiri
- Succeeded by: position abolished

Deputy Prime Minister of Iran
- In office 7 June 1978 – 12 February 1979

Director of the Second Bureau
- In office 19 April 1973 – 7 June 1978
- Monarch: Mohammad Reza Pahlavi
- Prime Minister: Amir-Abbas Hoveyda; Jamshid Amouzegar
- Preceded by: Azizullah Palizban
- Succeeded by: Naser Qoli Boroumand Jezi

Acting Deputy Director of SAVAK
- In office 12 April 1973 – 19 April 1973
- Monarch: Mohammad Reza Pahlavi
- Prime Minister: Amir-Abbas Hoveyda
- Preceded by: Hossein Fardoust
- Succeeded by: Ali Motazed

Director of the Third General Directorate of SAVAK
- In office 5 June 1963 – 12 April 1973
- Monarch: Mohammad Reza Pahlavi
- Prime Minister: Asadollah Alam; Hassan Ali Mansur; Amir-Abbas Hoveyda
- Preceded by: Mostafa Amjadi
- Succeeded by: Parviz Sabeti

Personal details
- Born: 24 June 1921 Tehran, Qajar Iran
- Died: 11 April 1979 (aged 57) Tehran, Iran
- Cause of death: Execution by islamists revolutionaries
- Education: Officers' School; University of Tehran; War University

Military service
- Allegiance: Pahlavi Iran
- Branch/service: Ground Forces
- Years of service: 1941–1979
- Rank: Lieutenant General
- Battles/wars: World War II; Anglo-Soviet invasion of Iran; Iran crisis of 1946; Siahkal incident; Iranian Revolution

Nasser Moghaddam (Persian: ناصر مقدم; 24 June 1921 – 11 April 1979) was an Iranian military officer and intelligence chief who served as the fourth and final director of SAVAK from 6 June 1978 to 12 February 1979. He assumed the position after the arrest of General Nematollah Nassiri in 1978, following an order issued by the Shah. Moghaddam, along with Nassri and Nassiri's predecessor, Hassan Pakravan, was found guilty of corruption and subsequently sentenced to death on 11 March 1979, in accordance with the order of Ayatollah Khomeini.

== Early life ==
Nasser Moghaddam was born in 1921 in Tehran, Qajar Iran. He attended a military high school and later pursued a law degree at the Faculty of Tehran University.

Nasser lived with his father until the age of 10. From 1935 onwards, for unknown reasons, he resided with his uncle Hossein, who did not treat him kindly. Consequently, Nasser made the decision to return home.

In 1928, he enrolled in a primary school and in 1934, he joined the military school of Tehran, from which he graduated in 1940.

In 1941, during the final year of Reza Shah's reign, Nasser enlisted in the Officers' School, where he remained until 1943. He completed his studies at the officers' academy, attaining the rank of 2nd rank lieutenant, and decided to pursue further education at the Faculty of Law, University of Tehran and the War University.

During his time at the Officers' School and the University of Tehran, Nasser not only acquired a solid foundation in military and security studies but also developed a proficient command of the French and English languages.

== Career in army and intelligence services ==
At the Officers' School, Nasser met Hossein Fardoust, an event he considered to be the most significant in his life. This was likely because the recent friendship between the Shah and Fardoust also contributed to his career growth. Thanks to his acquaintance with Fardoust, Nasser served in various divisions of the army until 1964, including the 10th Division of Khorasan, the 5th Division of Lorestan, the Shah's Guard, the Ministry of Defense, the Military Prosecutor's Office, and the Academy.

In 1959, the "Special Intelligence Bureau" was established in Iran, and General Hossein Fardoust extended an offer to Moghaddam to collaborate with him. Nasser agreed to the proposal.

=== Uprising of 15 Khordad (1963) ===
After the suppression of the 15 Khordad uprising, General Fardoust capitalized on the situation and requested the Shah to replace Mostafa Amjadi, the director general of the Department of Internal Security, with Moghaddam. The Shah, aware of Amjadi's close association with Teymur Bakhtiar, agreed to Fardoust's suggestion. Moghaddam served as the director of the third Department for approximately 10 years. His responsibilities encompassed overseeing the actions of revolutionary groups and providing the Shah with weekly updates on the public sentiment, a task he purportedly executed competently.

== Second Bureau of Intelligence and Counterintelligence ==
In 1971, Lieutenant General Nasser Moghaddam was promoted to the position of Director of the Army's Second Bureau of Intelligence and Counterintelligence.

On 19 April 1973, General Moghaddam assumed the role of Deputy Director General of Intelligence and Counterintelligence, serving under General Azizollah Palizban. The order stated that Nasser Moghaddam's tenure in SAVAK had come to an end, and he would be appointed as the head of the Information Bureau of the 2nd Bureau while retaining the position of Adjutant to the Shah.

== Military ranks ==
Moghaddam's military ranks:

- 25 October 1966 – Brigadier General
- 23 October 1970 – Major General
- 25 October 1971 – Shah's personal adjutant.

== General Moghaddam at the head of SAVAK (June 1978 – February 1979) ==
In April 1978, General Moghaddam sent a confidential letter to the Shah, urging the monarch to take decisive action in light of the country's circumstances. He emphasized the necessity of exemplary punishment for corrupt government officials associated with the royal family and stressed the importance of engaging in a constructive dialogue with the clergy. Additionally, it is evident from various sources that the CIA had been providing financial support to General Moghaddam for many years.

In an attempt to alleviate the tense situation, the Shah, under urgent request from Washington, made concessions to the Iranian public. In June 1978, he removed Nassiri, the powerful director of SAVAK. Lieutenant General Nasser Moghaddam was appointed as the new head of the secret police due to his connections within the opposition, including the Shiite clergy.

In contemporary times, many Iranians have criticized the Shah's decision, considering it a mistake that weakened the Security Service. The threat came from entirely different forces. Unlike General Nassiri, Moghaddam advocated for a constructive dialogue with the religious opposition. It is worth nothing that Moghaddam had ties to opposition groups, including Shiite clerics.

Before assuming his new role, General Moghaddam served as the head of military counterintelligence. He was known for opposing the use of torture and his appointment aimed to facilitate better integration between the army and the secret service.

Upon assuming his position, Moghaddam focused on dismantling the influence of Nematollah Nassiri, who was then serving as the Iranian ambassador to Pakistan. Reports suggest that the CIA exerted pressure on Nassiri and his supporters to remove them from the intelligence service, with Nasser Moghaddam being the only viable replacement. During an interview, a former SAVAK officer currently in exile highlighted the significance of Nassiri's dismissal, but also noted that the dismissal of General Ali Motazed, Nassiri's deputy, was equally erroneous. With Moghaddam's appointment, the era of SAVAK's "Iron rule" came to an end.

General Moghaddam had previously served as the army's chief of counterintelligence and was known for his opposition to torture during interrogations. His appointment to his new position was a result of the Shah's desire to integrate the army and SAVAK, aiming to implement democratic reforms within the armed forces. As an example, Moghaddam allowed lawyers to attend the interrogations of defendants.

Following the riots of 21–22 July 1978, the Shah convened a meeting with two generals, Fardoust and Moghaddam, to discuss an action plan against the protesters. However, the meeting failed to produce any substantial results.

=== Barzan Ibrahim al-Tikriti secret mission to Tehran (September 1978) ===
Shortly after Moghaddam's appointment, a meeting took place between senior SAVAK officials and the leadership of the Iraqi intelligence service. During this meeting, the Iranian side raised concerns about neutralizing Ayatollah Khomeini's political activities. Iraqi officials expressed their full solidarity on this matter. Notably, in early September 1978, Barzan Ibrahim al-Tikriti, the Director of Iraqi Intelligence, secretly traveled to Tehran. He conveyed Saddam Hussein's proposal to the Shah: "His Majesty must put down the revolt with an iron fist, and if you (the Shah) need help in this matter, Iraq is ready to stand by you." Barzan Ibrahim al-Tikriti suggested assassinating Khomeini, who was residing in Najaf at the time. Acting on the advice of Hossein Fardoust and Nasser Moghaddam, the Shah declined Saddam Hussein's offer. Shortly afterward, Khomeini was expelled from the country and sought refuge in France. Controlling his activities was much easier while he was in Iraq, but in France it became increasingly challenging. Western media portrayed Khomeini as a global figure. Reuven Merhav, an Israeli intelligence officer, later observed that the Shah failed to grasp the consequences of his decision.

== Iranian Revolution ==
The outbreak of the revolutionary wave was followed by an exodus of security and military officials from the country. For instance, Parviz Sabeti, who was in charge of the 3rd Department, departed on 27 November. General Gholam Ali Oveissi and Tehran Police Chief General Moulavi left Iran in January 1979 and relocated to the United States.

On 16 January 1979, the Shah and his family departed Iran. On 1 February, Khomeini returned from exile and assumed personal leadership of the revolutionary process. After three days of battling against the Shah's Imperial Guard, Khomeini seized control.

Following the revolution's victory, representatives of Mehdi Bazargan approached Moghaddam and offered him a prominent role in the establishment of a new security service. Moghaddam accepted the offer and later recollected, "It seems that Bazargan will thank for the kindness I have done for him." Concurrently, Moghaddam attempted to destroy all documents in which he was implicated as a participant in repressive actions.

On 15 February, following the execution of former SAVAK director Nematohla Nassiri, Moghaddam realized that his situation was dire and decided to go into hiding temporarily, intending to leave the country at the earliest opportunity. However, he was swiftly apprehended and handed over to the Revolutionary Tribunal. Moghaddam was even impressed by the efficiency of the new security apparatus, stating, "What smart people. If they were my employees at SAVAK, I would be much more successful."

While in prison, Moghaddam held hope for a prompt release and securing a favourable position with the support of Mehdi Bazargan. However, on 11 April 1979, General Nasser Moghaddam was executed by order of the Islamic Revolutionary Tribunal.

== Bibliography ==
- Habibollah Mehrjou (2013). "The last terrible" (According to life of Naser Moqadam). The Center for Islamic Revolution Documents.

Government offices
Preceded by Nematollah Nassiri	Director of the National Organization for Security and Intelligence; 1978–1979	Vacant Title next held by Khosrow Tehrani as Head of Prime Ministry Intelligence Office
