= Hossein Fardoust =

Deputy head of SAVAK (1917–1987)

Timsar Hossein Fardoust
- حسین فردوست
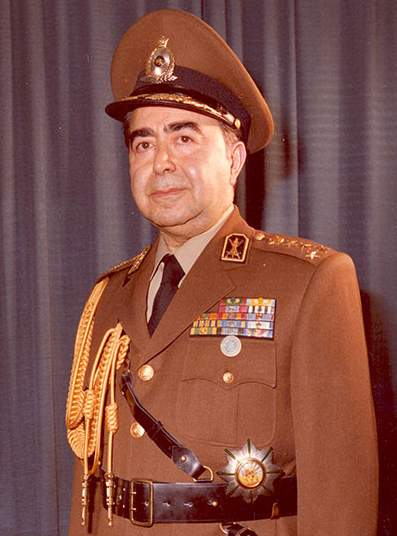
- Fardoust in the 1970s

Head of the Imperial Inspectorate Organization
- In office 1970–1979
- Monarch: Mohammad Reza Pahlavi
- Prime Minister: Amir-Abbas Hoveyda; Jamshid Amouzegar; Jafar Sharif-Emami; Gholam Reza Azhari; Shapour Bakhtiar
- Preceded by: Morteza Yazdanpanah
- Succeeded by: Office Abolished

Deputy Director of SAVAK
- In office 19 November 1962 – 12 April 1973
- Monarch: Mohammad Reza Pahlavi
- Prime Minister: Asadollah Alam; Hassan Ali Mansur; Amir-Abbas Hoveyda
- Preceded by: Hassan Alavikia
- Succeeded by: Nasser Moghaddam

Chief of the Special Intelligence Bureau
- In office 1959–1979
- Monarch: Mohammad Reza Pahlavi
- Prime Minister: Manouchehr Eghbal; Jafar Sharif-Emami; Ali Amini; Asadollah Alam; Hassan Ali Mansur; Amir-Abbas Hoveyda; Jamshid Amouzegar; Jafar Sharif-Emami; Gholam Reza Azhari; Shapour Bakhtiar

Personal details
- Born: 21 February 1917 Tehran, Qajar Iran
- Died: 18 May 1987 (aged 70) Tehran, Iran
- Resting place: Behesht-e Zahra
- Spouse(s): Parichehr (divorced); Tala
- Children: 1

Military service
- Allegiance: Pahlavi Iran
- Branch/service: Ground Forces
- Years of service: 1936–1979
- Rank: General
- Commands: Platoon commander in the 1st Division of Tehran (1938–1940); Company commander in the 1st Division of Tehran (1940–1941)

Hossein Fardoust (Persian: حسین فردوست; 21 February 1917 – 18 May 1987) was an Iranian military officer who was the deputy head of SAVAK, the Iranian intelligence agency during the Pahlavi era. He was also a childhood friend of the last Shah of Iran, Mohammad Reza Pahlavi.

== Early life and career in SAVAK ==
He first developed a friendship with the young crown prince when he was permitted to attend the private school established on the grounds of the palace to instruct the sons of court favourites, and later joined the crown prince, Ali Reza Pahlavi, and Mehrpour Teymourtash when they were dispatched to the Institut Le Rosey in Switzerland for further schooling. Fardoust remained a close confidant of the Crown Prince and years later served for ten years as deputy of SAVAK, running day-to-day affairs of the security and intelligence bureau, after heading the Special Intelligence Bureau of Iran - sometimes described as a sort of "SAVAK within SAVAK" for approximately 20 years. The Special Intelligence Bureau of Iran or, in Persian daftar-dar, allowed Fardoust to be the ultimate holder of raw intel and provider of reports to the Shah. Fardoust admitted writing down all the reported data by SAVAK, the Army intelligence etc. with pencil when reports of intelligence came by highest members of the intelligence community. Using pencil enabled him to manipulate and change the reports as he wished per MI6 directions. Therefore, the Shah and other members of the Senate were often misinformed.

== The KGB and Hossein Fardoust ==
When Mohammad Mosaddegh became Prime Minister in April 1951, Fardoust was one of the first to leave Iran under pressure from Mosaddegh. He went to Paris and began to study law. In Paris, Fardoust turned to an Iranian carpet dealer named Saberi and asked him to lend him money to finance his stay in France. Saberi was a connecting link for the Iranians in France and supported him financially. Fardoust also borrowed money from Saberi and they became friends. It was later discovered that Saberi worked for the KGB. It has been speculated that Saberi recruited him as an informant for the KGB.

After the overthrow of Mosaddegh's government, Fardoust returned to Iran and again became the Shah's confidant. Prime minister Fazlollah Zahedi received a reliable report from the Iranian military intelligence that Fardoust worked for foreign intelligence services. General Zahedi presented a report to the Shah, who reacted extremely negatively to the report and complained about the government, which was dismissive of his personal friend.

According to the memoirs of the Shah’s sister, Princess Ashraf Pahlavi was convinced that Fardoust was hiding vital information from the Shah, and that Fardoust even actively negotiated with Khomeini.

== Iranian revolution and Fardoust's position ==
Until the mid-1970s, Fardoust met with the Shah daily to personally inform him of the key details of intelligence reports. It is still unclear why the Shah did not want to meet in person with Fardoust two or three years before his fall. Fardoust retained his post, but now was forced to submit written reports to the Shah daily. The personal friendship that connected the Shah and Hossein Fardoust over the years has ended.

Some of the most important Iranian army generals worked for some time under the leadership of Hossein Fardoust at "Imperial Inspectorate Organization", including General Abbas Gharabaghi, who in January 1979 was appointed the chief of staff of the Iranian armed forces by the Shah, when the monarch was forced to leave Iran (January 16), and which contributed to the success of the revolution with its decision not to support the government approved by the Shah, prime minister Shapour Bakhtiar.

Fardoust obviously used the last few years of his tenure to establish close ties with those generals of the Iranian armed forces who criticized the Shah and played a decisive role in the first stage of the Islamic revolution in the decomposition of the old power structures of the monarchy. The very fact that General Hossein Fardoust and General Abbas Gharabaghi survived the Islamic Revolution intact, despite the fact that they worked with the Shah for many years, is considered by many researchers as clear evidence of their involvement in the Islamic Revolution. When protests against the Shah intensified in 1978, officers and politicians asked Fardoust to finally do something to stop Khomeini, to which Fardoust said: “It is completely useless to do anything. The Shah has long broken the law. It is time for him to paid the price for it".

Some authors note that Fardoust played an important role in the return of Ayatollah Khomeini from exile and in driving the Shah’s military and security personnel to the side of the revolutionaries. It was Fardoust who urged General Gharabaghi not to suppress the revolution by force.

Despite the high and important posts that he held under the Shah’s regime, and his close relations personally with the Shah, Fardoust remained in Iran after the overthrow of the monarchy. He was arrested, was in prison for some time, but, to everyone's surprise, he was not sentenced to death. According to the most common information, Fardoust actively cooperated with the Islamic regime, founded and until 1985 was the head of SAVAMA, the new security organization and secret police, which became the successor of SAVAK.

In 1985, General Fardoust was removed from all posts and imprisoned in December, where he was charged with cooperation with the KGB of the USSR.

== Rank ==
Third Lieutenant	Second Lieutenant	First Lieutenant	Captain	Major
1936	1938	1940	1944	1948
19	21	23	27	31

Lieutenant Colonel	Colonel	Brigadier General	Major General	Lieutenant General	General
1952	1955	1961	1966	1971	1976
35	38	44	49	54	59

== Last years ==
In April 1987, Fardoust appeared in public for the first time in a television "interview" with Islamic authorities. He described and denounced the life of the Shah, his court, and the corruption and dependency of the government he had served in.

In the interview he claimed 10,000 full-time investigators were needed by the Special Intelligence Bureau just to keep track of the money-grabbers and plunderers in the Shah's elite. "There was no way of keeping track of lesser crooks". The marriage and then the divorce of the Shah to Princess Fawzia of Egypt was arranged by the British. According to Ervand Abrahamian, the television interview, as with all other television interviews of prisoners in the Islamic Republic, should be taken with a grain of salt.

Three weeks after the interview appeared, the government announced that Fardoust had died from "old age and other natural causes".

== Posthumous memoirs ==
Three years after his death a newspaper run by the government, Kayhan-e Hava'i, ran a series of articles in both Persian and English of what were purported to be Fardoust's more detailed memoirs.

The book, entitled Khaterat-e Arteshbod-e Baznesheshteh Hossein Fardoust (The Memoirs of Retired General Hossein Fardoust), expanded on the themes of corruption and conspiracy in the Shah's court and government. The book alleges that foreign imperial powers, especially Britain, dominated Iran and nourished the Freemasons, the Baháʼís and the Jews—the book claims most Iranian politicians belonged to the Freemasons and that the Jews controlled "not only Israel but also the United States." Another surprising fact Fardoust—or the book credited to him—claimed to reveal was that celebrated nationalist Iranian Prime Minister Mohammad Mosaddegh was not a mortal enemy of the British, but had "always favored" them, and his campaign to nationalize the British Anglo-Persian Oil Company, today known as BP, had been inspired by the British themselves.

== Sources ==
- Abrahamian, Ervand, Tortured Confessions, (University of California Press, 1999),

Abdollah Shahbazi has published many books and articles, including "Rise and Fall of the Pahlavi dynasty." The two-volume set contained the controversial memoirs of General Hussein Fardoost, the head of Mohammad Reza Shah's secret service. Hussein Fardoust, did not remain for very long at the head of SAVAMA: in December 1985, he was accused of being a Soviet agent who was duly paid by the KGB and was stripped of his duties. He died two years later, apparently from a heart attack. The 2-volume Rise and Fall of the Pahlavi dynasty has been translated and can be read on the following site:
