= List of ambassadors of Iran to Syria =

Coordinates: 33.505608°N 36.264090°E

Ambassador of Iran to Syria
- Coat of Arms of Iran
- Incumbent; Vacant since December 8, 2024
- Inaugural holder: Habibullah Khan Hoveida
- Formation: 1921

The Iranian ambassador in Damascus was the official representative of the Government in Tehran to the Government of Syria.

The Qajar dynasty has had a consulate in Damascus before Proclamation of Arab Kingdom of Syria, on March 8, 1920.1920.The Iran–Syria relations was severed after Fall of the Assad regime.

== List of representatives ==
Diplomatic accreditation	Diplomatic accreditation Solar Hijri calendar	Ambassador	Persian language	Observations	List of presidents of Iran	List of presidents of Syria	Term end	Term end Solar Hijri calendar
1921	1299	Habibullah Khan Hoveyda	Persian: حبیب‌الله هویدا	He was father of last prime minister of Pahlavi Iran, Amir-Abbas Hoveyda	Ahmad Shah Qajar	Faisal I of Iraq		
September 21, 1944	1322	Masoud Moazed	Persian: مسعود معاضد	Diplomatic relations between Lebanon and Iran begin on September 21, 1944, when the Minister of Foreign Affairs receives Massoud Moazed, the Envoy Extraordinary and Minister, at the Petit Serail. Les relations diplomatiques entre le Liban et l'Iran s'ouvrent, le 21 septembre 1944, au moment où le ministre des AE reçoit, au Petit Sérail, Massoud Moazed, l'Envoyé extraordinaire et ministre plénipotentiaire d'Iran.	Mohammad Reza Pahlavi	Shukri al-Quwatli		
1953	1331	Masoud Moazed	Persian: مسعود معاضد	(† 1970 in Tehran) Minister to Syria and Lebanon, during the Qajar dynasty entitled Mojahed al-Mulk, was one of Iranian diplomats and politicians in the late Qajar and early days of the Pahlavi era.: In 1937 he was Consul General in Herat (Herat Province) in Afghanistan.; From 1952 to 1953 he was Iranian ambassador to Egypt, which coincided with the Egyptian revolution of 1952. He is buried at the Zahir-od-dowleh cemetery.	Mohammad Reza Pahlavi	Adib Shishakli		
1950	1328	Morteza Moshfegh Kazemi	Persian: مرتضی مشفق کاظمی	envoy Mortażā Mošfeq-e Kāẓemi	Mohammad Reza Pahlavi	Hashim al-Atassi	1954	1332
1954	1332	Abdol-Rahim Mir-Fendereski			Mohammad Reza Pahlavi	Hashim al-Atassi	May 1, 1954	
February 1, 1958	1336			The Iranian embassy in Damascus Syria became a consulate during the United Arab Republic, after the Syrian separation on 1961 Syrian coup d'état, the Iranian delegation with the royal Embassy was reopened in Damascus.	Mohammad Reza Pahlavi	Gamal Abdel Nasser	September 28, 1961	
September 28, 1961	1339	Fereydoun Diba	Persian: حسین دیبا		Mohammad Reza Pahlavi	Nazim al-Kudsi	November 16, 1965	
June 20, 1966	1341	Mahmoud Malayeri	Persian: محمود ملایری		Mohammad Reza Pahlavi	Nureddin al-Atassi	1967	1342
1966	1344	Ali Asemi	Persian: علی عاصمی	Chargé d'affaires. In November 1962 he was Chargé d'affaires of the Iranian ambassador to Saudi Arabia in Jedda.	Mohammad Reza Pahlavi	Nureddin al-Atassi	1968	1346
1968	1346	Ardeshir Noorzar	Persian: اردشیر نورآذر	Chargé d'affaires	Mohammad Reza Pahlavi	Nureddin al-Atassi	1973	1351
1973	1351	Hossein Montazam	Persian: حسین منتظم	Chargé d'affaires, (* 1926) Diplomat. Master of Arts from Geneva University in economic science. In 1953 he joined the State Railways and labour Ministry. in *In 1955 he was transferred to the Ministry of Foreign Affairs. was employed at the Translation and Press Selection; member of Protocol Department; Third Secretary to Imperial Iranian Embassy at the Hague : Third Secretary to Imperial Iranian Embassy in Rome; Second Secretary to Imperial Iranian Legation at Prague.	Mohammad Reza Pahlavi	Hafez al-Assad	1973	1352
1973	1352	Mohammad Poursartip	Persian: محمد پورسرتیپ	Chargé d'affaires (* 1920). In 1959 he was Chargé d'affaires of the Iranian ambassador to Austria. In 1968 he was Chargé d'affaires of the Iranian ambassador to Spain in 1974 he became Irnanian ambassador to Syria.	Mohammad Reza Pahlavi	Hafez al-Assad	1977	1357
1979	1357	Ali Motazed	Persian: علی معتضد	* Maj. Gen. Till the Victory of the Iranian Revolution Brigadier-General Ali Motazed, Deputy of SAVAK and later Iran's Ambassador to Syria prior to the victory of the 1979 Iranian Revolution, was in close touch with Shahpour J. (1924) MI 6.	Mohammad Reza Pahlavi	Hafez al-Assad	February 1, 1979	1357
February 1, 1979	1357	Abdul Rahim Gawahi	Persian: ابراهیم قلعه‌بیگی	Chargé d'affaires Abdolrahim Gavahi	Mohammad Reza Pahlavi	Hafez al-Assad	September 1, 1979	1358
1982	1360	Ali Akbar Mohtashamipur	Persian: سید علی‌اکبر محتشمی‌پور		Ali Khamenei	Hafez al-Assad	1986	1364
1986	1364	Muhammad Hassan Akhtari	Persian: محمدحسن اختری		Ali Khamenei	Hafez al-Assad	1998	1377
1999	1377	Hossein Sheikholeslam	Persian: حسین شیخ‌الاسلام		Mohammad Khatami	Hafez al-Assad	2004	1382
2004	1382	Mohammad Reza Bagheri	Persian: محمدرضا باقری	Iranian ambassador to Turkey	Mohammad Khatami	Bashar al-Assad	2006	1384
December 1, 2005	1383	Muhammad Hassan Akhtari	Persian: محمدحسن اختری	Hotjatoleslam Muhammad Hossan Anhtari, After serving for 12 years as Iran's ambassador to Damascus starting from 1986, Mohamad Hassan Akhtari has just taken up the same post he left in 1998.	Mahmoud Ahmadinejad	Bashar al-Assad	October 9, 2007	1386
2008	1386	Seyyed Ahmad Mousavi	Persian: سید احمد موسوی (سیاستمدار)	MP Ahmad Mousavi (born in Shahrestan)] was a member of the Ahwaz constituency during the seventh parliamentary term Deputy Minister and Chief of Hajj and Pilgrimage Organization (Iran). Iran's Special Ambassador to Syria	Mahmoud Ahmadinejad	Bashar al-Assad	2012	1390
2011	1390	Mohammad Reza Raouf Sheibani	Persian: محمدرضا رئوف شیبانی	Mohammad Reza Raouf Sheibani]] October 2011	Mahmoud Ahmadinejad	Bashar al-Assad	2017	1396
April 27, 2017	1396	Javad Torkabadi	Persian: جواد ترک‌آبادی	Javad Turkabadi]] In 2012 he was Iranian ambassador to Bahrain	Hassan Rouhani	Bashar al-Assad	2021	1400
May 10, 2021	1400	Mehdi Sobhani	Persian: مهدی سبحانی		Hassan Rouhani	Bashar al-Assad	2023	1402
April 26, 2023	1402	Hossein Akbari	Persian: حسین اکبری		Ebrahim Raisi	Bashar al-Assad	2024	1403

== See also ==
- Iran–Syria relations
