= Saïdeh Pakravan =

American poet

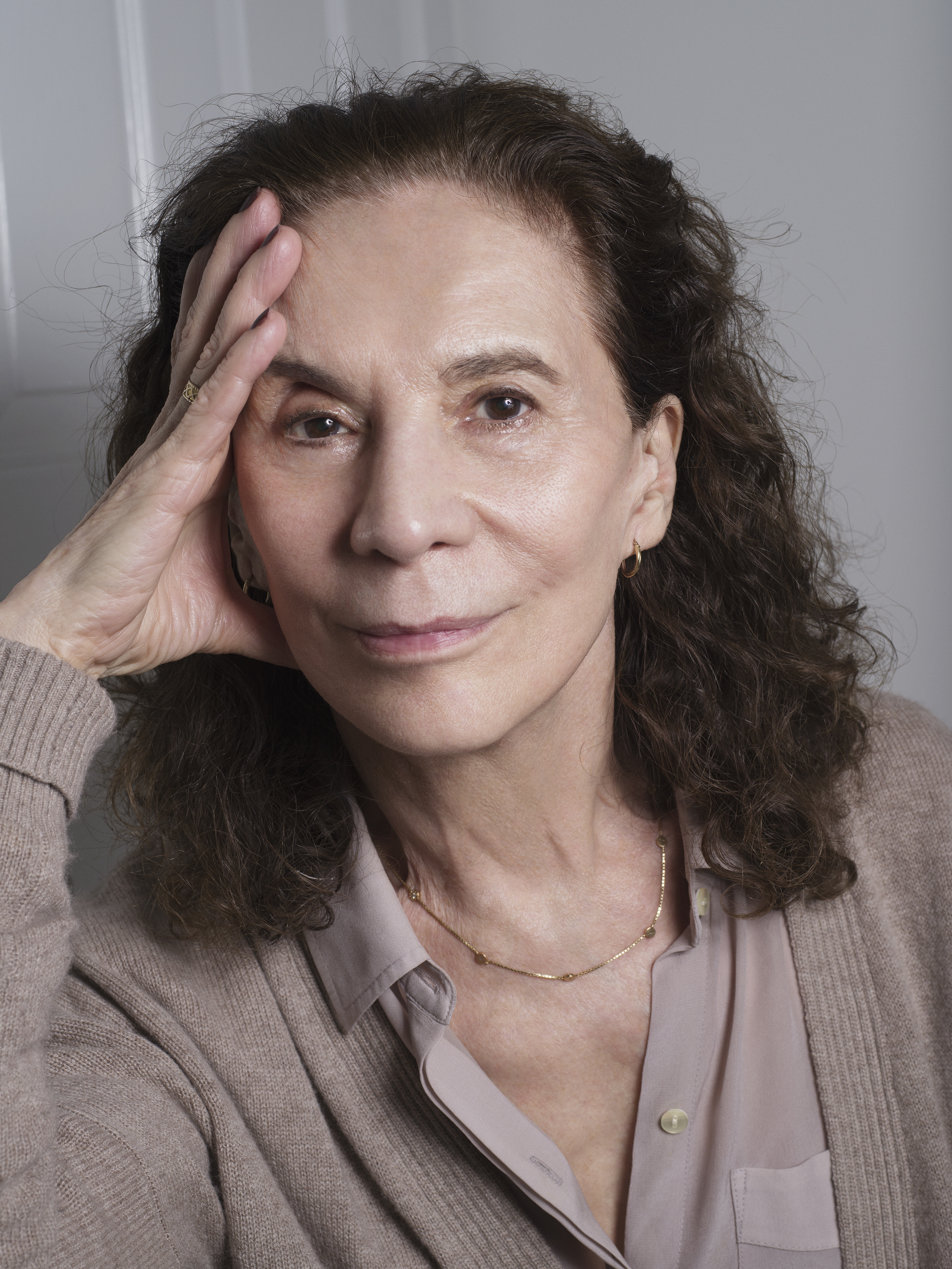
Saïdeh Pakravan

Saïdeh Pakravan, born in Iran in a French-speaking family, is a French-American author of fiction and non-fiction, a poet, film critic, and political blogger. She has lived between Washington, D.C. and Paris. She is the granddaughter of Amineh Pakravan, author of historical novels and studies, including Le Prince Sans Histoire (Prix Rivarol, 1951) and part of a family of generations of diplomats and high-ranking officials of many interests, especially, literature. Her father is General Hassan Pakravan. Saïdeh Pakravan started reading at age four and knew early on that she would become a writer. At eighteen she wrote her first French-language novel, Celle qui rêvait, and published it in installments.

From 1994 to 2001, she was editor-in-chief of Chanteh, a cultural and political English-language quarterly for second-generation Iranians. Her collection, The Arrest of Hoveyda: Stories of the Iranian Revolution was published in 1998. Numerous short stories, poems and essays by her have published in American and British literary journals. Her self-published novel Azadi, Protest in the Streets of Tehran, (2011) came out in installments on a Persian blog she launched for the purpose.

In late 2014 the French-language manuscript of Azadi, which Ms. Pakravan translated herself, was picked up by Belfond and published in France the next year to critical acclaim. In one review (Le Figaro, February 2015), she told the interviewer, "if one is amenable to compromise, one can live in Iran, and relatively well" In her review of the book for the cultural blog Eklektika, Muriel Barthe said, "It took us one night to get through this book, one night to experience a piece of history and make a new discovery of a country.".

Other novels by Saïdeh Pakravan (all of which were originally written in English) include La Trêve, Le Principe du Désir, and L’Émir, (Belfond 2018.) Her latest novel, Cent Voyages, will be published by the same publisher in January 2019.

== Political blogging ==
In the middle of 2011 Ms. Pakravan launched a political commentary blog, The Counter Argument, 'Popular wisdom is popular, but is it wise?'. She selects news stories that have divided the public and, having put the politically correct police on permanent leave she pens honest, deadpan articles in an attempt to rekindle the debate. Her latest post is "Dear Jamal," an anguished goodbye letter to the assassinated Washington Post op-ed writer Jamal Khashoggi.

== Film criticism ==
For the film site Screen Comment she has contributed nearly one hundred fifty movie reviews, writing on subjects as varied as BlacKkKlansman as 2018's Ready Player One She has also compiled the "One Hundred Years of Must-See Films" movies index

== Awards ==
F. Scott Fitzgerald award nomination for Best American Essays and a Pushcart Award.

For "Azadi" published by Belfond in 2015, Ms. Pakravan earned the following French awards: Prix de la Closerie des Lilas, 2015 (France), Prix du roman Marie-Claire, 2015 (France), Prix Atouts-Sud, 2015 (France), Prix LirEnThelle, 2015 (France)
