= Pardis Sabeti =

Iranian American scientist (born 1975)

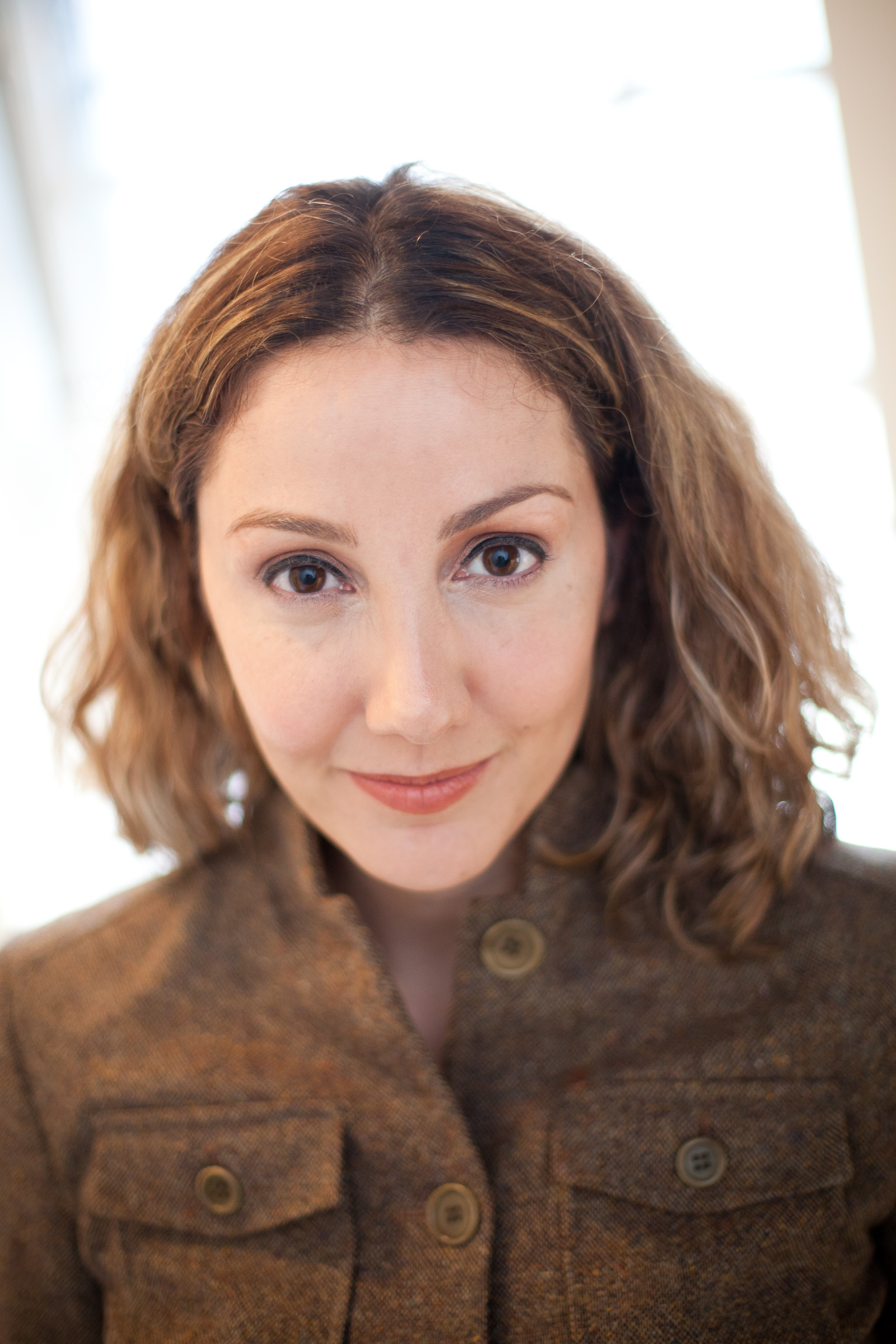
- Sabeti in 2011
- Born: Pardis Christine Sabeti; 25 December 1975 (age 50); Tehran, Imperial State of Iran
- Education: Massachusetts Institute of Technology (BS); New College, Oxford (MSc, DPhil); Harvard University (MD)
- Awards: TIME 100; National Academy of Medicine
- Scientific career
- Fields: Evolutionary genetics Genetic epidemiology Computational biology
- Workplaces: Harvard University; Broad Institute; Howard Hughes Medical Institute
- Thesis: The Effects of Natural Selection and Recombination on Genetic Diversity in Humans: An Investigation of Plasmodium Falciparum Malaria in African Populations (2002)
- Doctoral advisor: Ryk Ward; Anthony Boyce
- Website: Official website

Pardis Christine Sabeti (Persian: پردیس ثابتی; born 25 December 1975) is an Iranian-American computational biologist, medical geneticist, and evolutionary geneticist. She is a professor in the Center for Systems Biology and Department of Organismic and Evolutionary Biology at Harvard University, professor of Immunology and Infectious Disease at the Harvard T.H. Chan School of Public Health, core institute member at the Broad Institute, and an investigator of the Howard Hughes Medical Institute.

Sabeti and her lab initiated technologies for detecting, tracking, and countering deadly pathogens, including Ebola, Zika, Lassa, and SARS-CoV-2. They also created algorithms and molecular tools to characterize the human genome and methods for gene delivery of new biomedicines to specific tissues.

Sabeti was named one of Time Magazine's Persons of the Year in 2014 (Ebola Fighters), and one of the Time 100 most influential people in 2015. Her continued efforts including during the COVID-19 pandemic led her to receive a Time 100 Impact Award and to be inducted into the National Academy of Medicine. She is the current host of the educational series Against All Odds: Inside Statistics sponsored by Annenberg Learner and a Crash Course on Outbreak Science and is the lead singer and a writer for the rock band Thousand Days.

== Early life and education ==
Sabeti was born in 1975 in Tehran, Iran, to Nasrin and Parviz Sabeti. Her father came from a Baháʼí Faith family but never officially joined as a member and was the deputy in SAVAK, Iran's intelligence agency, and a high ranking security official in Shah's regime.

Her family fled Iran in October 1978, shortly before the Iranian Revolution, when Sabeti was two years old, and found sanctuary in Florida. As a child, Sabeti wanted to be a flower-shop owner, novelist, or doctor. However, she was most passionate about math. She had a sister, Parisa, who was 2 years older. Growing up, Parisa taught Pardis the course material she had learned the year before in school, leading Pardis to be "almost two years ahead of her classmates" when the school year began. Throughout her life, Sabeti played many sports including competitive tennis.

Sabeti went to Trinity Preparatory School in Florida. In high school, she was a National Merit Scholar, class president, valedictorian, and member of the Varsity tennis team. She additionally attributes part of her inspiration towards infectious disease research to the 1995 movie Outbreak.

Sabeti attended the Massachusetts Institute of Technology (MIT), where she was a member of the varsity tennis team and class president, graduating in 1997 with a major in biology and a "perfect 5.0 average." At MIT, she began her research career in David Bartel's laboratory and was advised by Eric Lander, and was a teaching assistant for undergraduate courses in genetics and biochemistry. She created the MIT Freshman Leadership Program and initiated the school's larger pre-orientation programming.

Sabeti was selected as Rhodes Scholar and completed a masters in human biology followed by doctoral work in evolutionary genetics in 2002, at New College, Oxford, earning a M.Sc. and D.Phil. She received a Doctor of Medicine (M.D.) at Harvard Medical School in 2006 summa cum laude. She was the third woman to receive this honor. The Paul & Daisy Soros Fellowships for New Americans supported her medical studies. Sabeti initially planned to enter medicine and become a doctor, but she decided to pursue research instead after completing medical school and discovering she preferred research to medicine.

== Career and research ==
=== Human genetics ===
As a graduate student at Oxford and postdoctoral fellow with Eric Lander at the Broad Institute, Sabeti developed a family of statistical tests that identify regions of the genome under positive natural selection, by identifying common genetic variants found on unusually long haplotypes. Her tests, extended haplotype homozygosity (EHH), the long-range haplotype (LRH) test, and cross population extended haplotype homozygosity (XP-EHH), are designed to detect advantageous mutations whose frequency in human populations has risen rapidly over the last 10,000 years. As a faculty member at Harvard, Sabeti and her group have developed a statistical test to pinpoint signals of selection, the Composite of Multiple Signals (CMS),

=== Infectious disease ===
In 2014, having worked for a decade together in West Africa on Lassa fever and other infectious diseases, Sabeti and Christian Happi, a Cameroonian geneticist, and their teams launched the African Center of Excellence for Genomics of Infectious Disease (ACEGID) to enhance pathogen surveillance and education in Africa. Their efforts in the Ebola outbreak in West Africa helped identify the first cases in Sierra Leone and Nigeria, and advanced genomic sequencing technology to identify a single point of infection from an animal reservoir to a human. RNA changes further suggested that the first human infection was followed by exclusive human to human transmissions. They also showed the virus was mutating to be able to infect human cells more easily.

Sabeti's team continued to support outbreak response, developing and deploying genomic and computational tools to elucidate the origins, evolution, and community transmission of viruses. During the Zika epidemic in 2016, Sabeti's team assembled the largest sequencing study of the virus and showed the virus was circulating undetected for many months. During the 2018 Lassa fever outbreak in Nigeria, her and Happi's team rapidly sequenced the virus on ground in the country, providing real-time feedback to the Nigeria CDC on the origins and spread of the outbreak. During COVID-19, her team led genomic investigations that elucidated the first superspreader events, variants of concern, and transmission from vaccinated individuals. In 2019, Sabeti and Happi's teams were "awarded funding from the TED Audacious Project to build Sentinel, a pandemic pre-emption and response system."

=== Other contributions ===
Her lab developed a family of statistical tests to detect and characterize correlations in datasets of any kind, maximal information non-parametric exploration (MINE). Sabeti has via her collaboration with Michael Mitzenmacher an Erdős number of 3. In February 2021 Sabeti co-authored a paper on how a certain level of COVID-19 anti-bodies may provide lasting protection against the virus, studying 4300 employees of SpaceX with its CEO Elon Musk.

==== Outreach and teaching ====
In May 2015, she delivered a TED Talk, called "How we'll fight the next deadly virus." In September 2021, Sabeti joined the YouTube channel Crash Course to host its series on Outbreak Science. Sabeti hosted the Against All Odds video series with the goal of explaining statistics to high school and college students. Sabeti is an annual participant in the Distinguished Lecture Series at the acclaimed Research Science Institute at MIT for high school students.

== Awards and honors ==
Sabeti was the 2012 recipient of Smithsonian magazine's American Ingenuity Award in the Natural Sciences category. In 2014, she received the Vilcek Prize for Creative Promise in Biomedical Science. She is a World Economic Forum Young Global Leader and a National Geographic Emerging Explorer.

In addition to being named one of Time Magazine's Persons of the Year in 2014 (Ebola Fighters), Sabeti was listed as one of Time Magazine's 100 most influential people in 2015, and was awarded the Time 100 Impact Award in 2022. Sabeti was on the list of the BBC's 100 Women announced on 23 November 2020.

In 2015, Sabeti was selected for the prestigious Howard Hughes Medical Institute Investigator award. She has also received a Burroughs Wellcome Fund Career Award in the Biomedical Sciences, a Packard Foundation award in Science and Engineering, and an NIH Director's New Innovator Award, and a L'Oréal for Women in Science Fellowship.

Sabeti was inducted in the National Academy of Medicine in 2020.

In 2023, Sabeti was honored by the National Institutes of Health (NIH) for advancing diversity, equity, inclusion and accessibility in genomics.

As co-leader of the Sentinel pandemic prevention project, Sabeti's initiative ws selected for the MacArthur Foundation 100& Change Award to transform infectious disease prevention and surveillance.

In 2026, she was elected to the National Academy of Sciences.

== Personal life ==
Sabeti is the lead singer and songwriter for the rock band Thousand Days. In her spare time, Sabeti enjoys playing volleyball and participates in Harvard's summer volleyball league.

On 17 July 2015, Sabeti suffered a near-fatal accident at a conference in Montana. She was a passenger in an ATV that went over a cliff, and catapulted onto boulders. She shattered her pelvis and knees, and sustained a brain injury. She completed rehab to return to teaching.

== Filmography ==
- Against All Odds ... Host (32 episodes)
- Crash Course - Outbreak Science Host (15 episodes)

== See also ==
- List of Iranian Americans
- List of famous Iranian women
