= Amineh Pakravan =

Iranian historian (1893–1958)

- Born: June 1, 1893; Paris
- Died: June 17, 1958 (aged 65); Tehran
- Occupations: lecturer writer
- Spouse: Fathollah Pakravan
- Children: Hassan Pakravan

Academic work
- Discipline: historian
- Institutions: University of Tehran

Amineh Pakravan (Persian: امینه پاکروان, June 1, 1893 in Paris – June 17, 1958 in Tehran) was an Iranian historian, writer and university professor, the wife of Fathollah Pakravan, a Qajar and Pahlavi diplomat and the mother of Major General Hassan Pakravan, the second commander of SAVAK.

== Early life ==
Amineh Pakravan was born in Paris in 1893. Her mother was an Austrian writer named Alice Anne Herzfeld and her father was an Iranian politician named Hassan Khan, who was Iran's ambassador to the Ottoman Empire for a while. She spent her teenage years in Istanbul where she married a Muslim politician. After that, she spent years in Iran, Egypt, Austria, Germany, France, Turkey and Belgium. She was awarded the prestigious French Prix Rivarol, which the French government gives to foreign authors who write directly in French. She was related to the House of Habsburg of the Austria-Hungary.

== University background ==
Amineh Pakravan wrote articles about Iran in Cairo publications under the pseudonym "Iran Dokht" and became famous in Egypt with the same name. After the death of her first husband and her second marriage, she went to Iran and for some time taught French literature and art history at Tehran University and published valuable historical books about Iran. Amineh Pakravan's first historical research book called "The Unknown Prince" was published in France in 1944 and won the Riveral Prize. After that, she published more research works in the field of history, especially Iran in the 19th century, which have been reprinted several times. For some time, she taught French literature and art history at the University of Tehran and made great efforts to introduce Iranian painting (Persian miniature) to Europeans and held numerous conferences in different languages.

== Death ==
Amineh Pakravan died on June 17, 1958, at the age of 65 due to cancer.

== bibliography ==
- شاهزاده گمنام (امیر بی‌تاریخ)
- قزوین پایتخت از یاد رفته
- عباس میرزا
- مقدرات ایرانی
- تهران قدیم
- نسل چهارم
- آغامحمدخان قاجار
