= Mansur Rafizadeh =

Iranian-born intelligence expert (1930–2018)

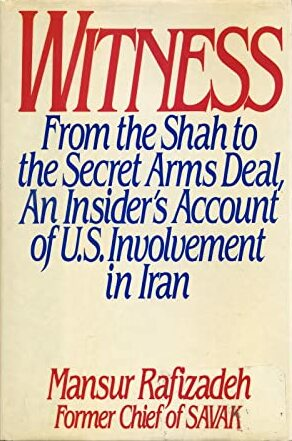
Cover of Witness

Mansur Rafizadeh (Persian: منصور رفیع‌زاده; 14 December 1930, Kerman, Iran - 8 February 2018, Middletown, New York) was an Iranian-born intelligence expert who worked for multiple intelligence agencies and, in 1987, wrote an exposé, Witness: From the Shah to the Secret Arms Deal, An Insider's Account of U.S. Involvement in Iran, for which he is best known.

He studied at Tehran University law school, then moved to the United States where he studied at Harvard and New York University. He worked for the Iranian Pahlavi dynasty during the 1970s and, possibly, for the CIA into the early 1980s. He also worked in New York City at the Iranian Mission to the United Nations. After the Iranian Revolution in 1979, diplomats with the Islamic Republic of Iran stated that he was an agent of SAVAK (the Shah's secret police) in the U.S., a claim he denied at the time. Years later, he confirmed the claim.

In the above-mentioned book, he claims to have been the U.S. director for SAVAK. Reviewer Nikki R. Keddie, a scholar at UCLA, stated that book could not be recommended for a general audience, as it was "too unreliable to be truly informative". In 1992, a woman who also had links to the Shah, Parivash Rafizadeh, was murdered on her front lawn in New Jersey, and The New York Times reported that Mansur was likely her brother-in-law, though they could not confirm this.

Following the publication of his book, he never returned to Iran, settling in upstate New York, where he and his brother, Mozafar, operated a dairy farm. Later, he opened a water bottling plant in Forestport. He never married and died in 2018, aged 87.
