= Parviz Sabeti =

Iranian lawyer, SAVAK deputy (born 1936)

- پرویز ثابتی
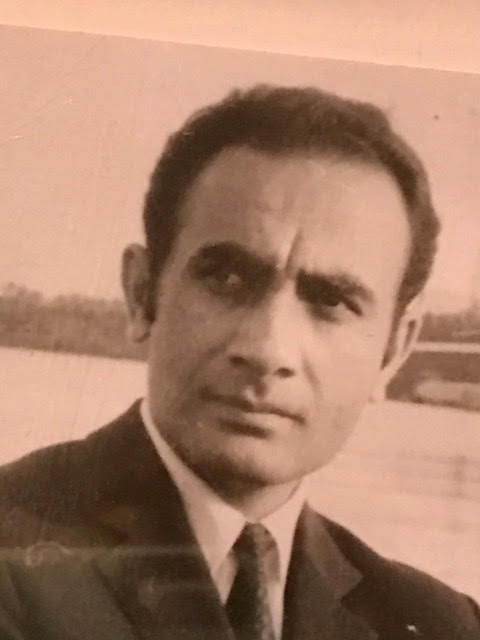
- Sabeti in 1970

Deputy Director of SAVAK
- In office 6 June 1978 – 12 February 1979
- Monarch: Mohammad Reza Pahlavi
- Prime Minister: Jamshid Amouzegar; Jafar Sharif-Emami; Gholam Reza Azhari; Shapour Bakhtiar
- Preceded by: Ali Motazed
- Succeeded by: Office abolished

Director of the Third General Directorate of SAVAK
- In office 12 April 1973 – 31 October 1978
- Monarch: Mohammad Reza Pahlavi
- Prime Minister: Amir-Abbas Hoveyda; Jamshid Amouzegar
- Preceded by: Nasser Moghaddam
- Succeeded by: Ali Tabatabai

Civilian Adjutant to the Royal Court
- In office 1969 – 31 October 1978
- Monarch: Mohammad Reza Pahlavi
- Prime Minister: Amir-Abbas Hoveyda; Jamshid Amouzegar; Jafar Sharif-Emami

National Security Advisor to Prime Minister
- In office November 1964 – August 1978
- Monarch: Mohammad Reza Pahlavi
- Prime Minister: Hassan Ali Mansur; Amir-Abbas Hoveyda; Jamshid Amouzegar; Jafar Sharif-Emami

Personal details
- Born: 25 March 1936 (age 90) Sang-e Sar, Semnan province, Imperial State of Iran
- Children: 2, including Pardis
- Education: Faculty of Law and Political Science, University of Tehran

Parviz Sabeti (Persian: پرویز ثابتی; born 25 March 1936) is an Iranian lawyer and former intelligence officer who was a former SAVAK deputy under the regime of Mohammad Reza Pahlavi. From 1978 to 1979, he served as the final Deputy Director of SAVAK.

Born in Sang-e Sar, Semnan province, Sabeti received a law degree from the University of Tehran and joined the SAVAK, Iran's intelligence agency in the Shah's regime, in 1957. He quickly rose to become the acting director of the SAVAK's so-called third division, the Division of Surveillance and Pursuit, and later became its director.

He has been called one of the most powerful men in the last two decades of the Pahlavi era. Historian Abbas Milani describes him as "like a character from a le Carré novel" and says that "As his fame and reputation grew, his name and face disappeared from the public domain."

In February 2025, three former Iranian political prisoners residing in the United States filed a civil lawsuit against Sabeti under the Torture Victim Protection Act, accusing him of orchestrating and overseeing their arbitrary detention and torture during the 1970s. In October 2026, a federal judge rejected Sabeti's motion to dismiss the lawsuit on statute of limitations grounds, clearing the case to proceed toward trial.

== Biography ==
Parviz Sabeti was born in 1936 into a Baháʼí Faith family. However, his father lost his right to be part of the Baháʼí community, and Parviz Sabeti never became a practicing Baháʼí. He graduated from the Law School of the University of Tehran. He was initially hired as a judge in the Ministry of Justice. Having shown a keen interest in public policy and politics, he was recruited into the SAVAK, which was part of the Prime Minister's office, in 1959. This was a time when a new policy of introducing civilians into an organization staffed by primarily ex-military rank and file was introduced. Initially, he worked as a political analyst in the department of internal security and very soon became the head of political analysis where he was in charge of preparing and writing daily, periodical and special reports which went ultimately via the chain of command to the Shah of Iran.

Although Sabeti was philosophically against Marxism and radical Islam, he believed that arresting and prosecuting members of such groups should not be the only course of action. The cycle of actions and reactions of dissent, revolt, then crackdown would continue until the government, through substantial reforms, attempted to remove the roots of dissatisfactions and create more room for the participation of people in the political system.

At the height of Mohammad Reza Pahlavi’s power, the Shah threatened to court-martial Sabeti because he wrote a critical report of one of the Shah's close friends, according to Sabeti in 2004 during a telephone call with historian Abbas Milani. Impressions by the Shah towards Parviz Sabeti had changed by the late 1970s when Sabeti, as the de facto security advisor to the Prime Minister and spokesman for the government, provided a long and impressive TV interview exposing the plots by the Iraqi regime of Saddam Hussein against Iran, with the collusion of internal enemies of the Shah. He continued to provide two more such interviews exposing the tactics of two major opposition groups, one Communist and one Islamic-Marxist.

None of this undid however the fact that he was the only civilian leader to have reached a leadership position at SAVAK, with the inevitable friction with the more hard-line, one dimensional attitude of those with a military background. One example being his differences with General Nematollah Nassiri who was chief of SAVAK and deputy Prime Minister for 14 years. Nassiri who was a loyal soldier for the Shah, very often had clashes with Sabeti.

Sabeti and his family fled Iran after the Iranian Revolution in 1979 and settled in Florida where he became a real estate developer. Pardis Sabeti, a Harvard biology professor, and one of Time Magazine's Persons of the Year in 2014, is his daughter.

== Torture lawsuit ==
In February 2025, three Iranian dissidents aged 68 to 85 residing in California filed a civil lawsuit against Sabeti in the United States District Court for the Middle District of Florida under the Torture Victim Protection Act (TVPA). The plaintiffs, represented by the Center for Justice and Accountability, alleged that they were abducted by SAVAK in Tehran, beaten into false confessions, and subjected to severe torture, including electric shocks, near-drownings, forced nail extraction, and the use of the "Apollo" torture helmet, under Sabeti's direct authority.

The plaintiffs stated they were only able to locate Sabeti after a photograph of him attending a 2023 anti-Iranian government demonstration was posted to social media by his daughter, asserting that he had spent the prior four decades concealing his identity and whereabouts in Florida. Sabeti's defense counsel contested this claim, submitting property records, public appearances, and photographs alongside figures such as George H. W. Bush and Jeb Bush to argue that he had lived openly in the United States.

Sabeti denied all allegations of involvement in abuses, maintaining that he personally opposed torture and that his work in SAVAK was administrative.

In August 2025, Senior U.S. District Judge Gregory A. Presnell rejected Sabeti's initial motion to dismiss the lawsuit outright and ordered discovery on whether the standard 10-year statute of limitations under the TVPA was subject to equitable tolling. On 7 October 2026, Judge Presnell rejected Sabeti's motion for summary judgment on timeliness grounds, allowing the torture allegations to proceed to discovery on the merits.
