= Towhid Prison =

Prison in Iran turned into torture museum

Coordinates: 35°41′13″N 51°25′07″E

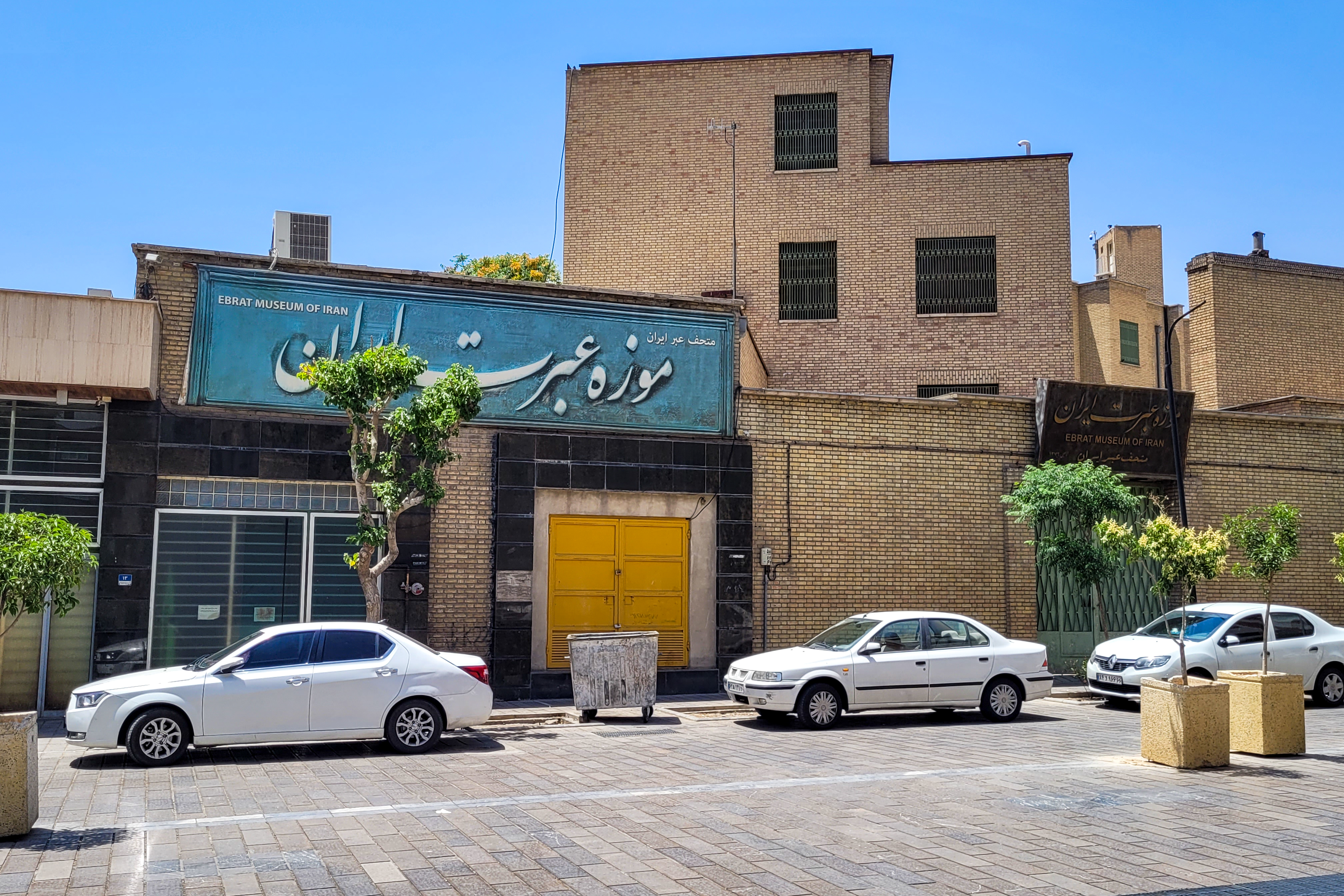
The Ebrat Museum.

Anti-sabotage Joint Committee, or Komiteh Moshtarak, was built in the 1930s. It was made out of repurposed prison space with German assistance and opened in 1937 under the reign of Reza Shah. It was used by Pahlavi regime, especially its secret police known as SAVAK against political opponents. Following the 1979 Iranian Revolution, the newly proclaimed Islamic Republic of Iran renamed the prison "Towhid", reopening it as a political detention and interrogation center. A wave of student protests amid reports of torture in the summer of 1999 caused the Islamic Republic to shut down the prison in August 2000. It is currently the Ebrat Museum of Iran ("Edification Museum") in Tehran. According to historian Golnar Nikpour, the museum erases the leftist and ethnic liberation victims of the prison and ignores the prison's continued operation under the Islamic Republic, instead favouring an Islamist narrative. The museum can be viewed online via a virtual tour.

== Gallery ==
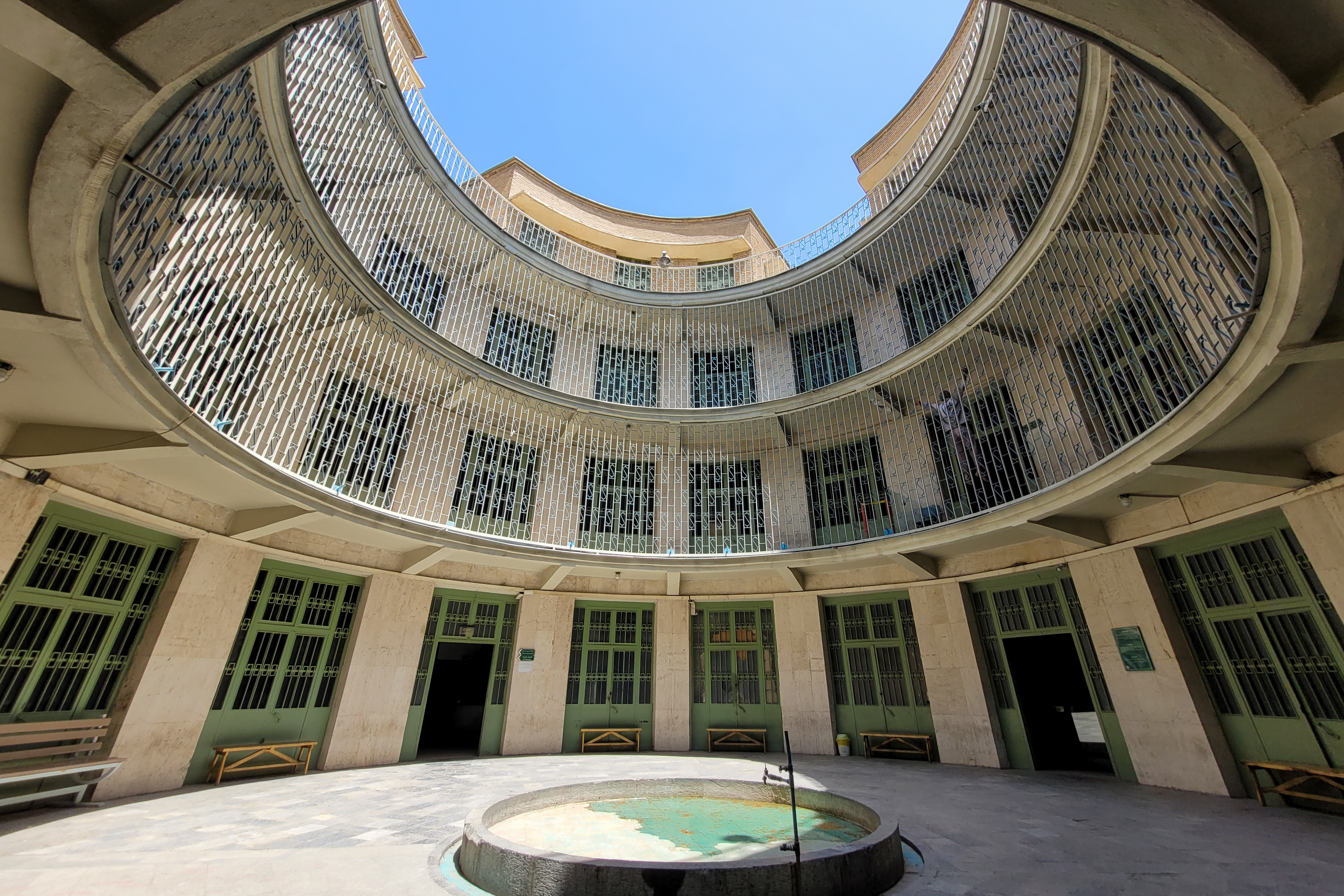
The inner courtyard.

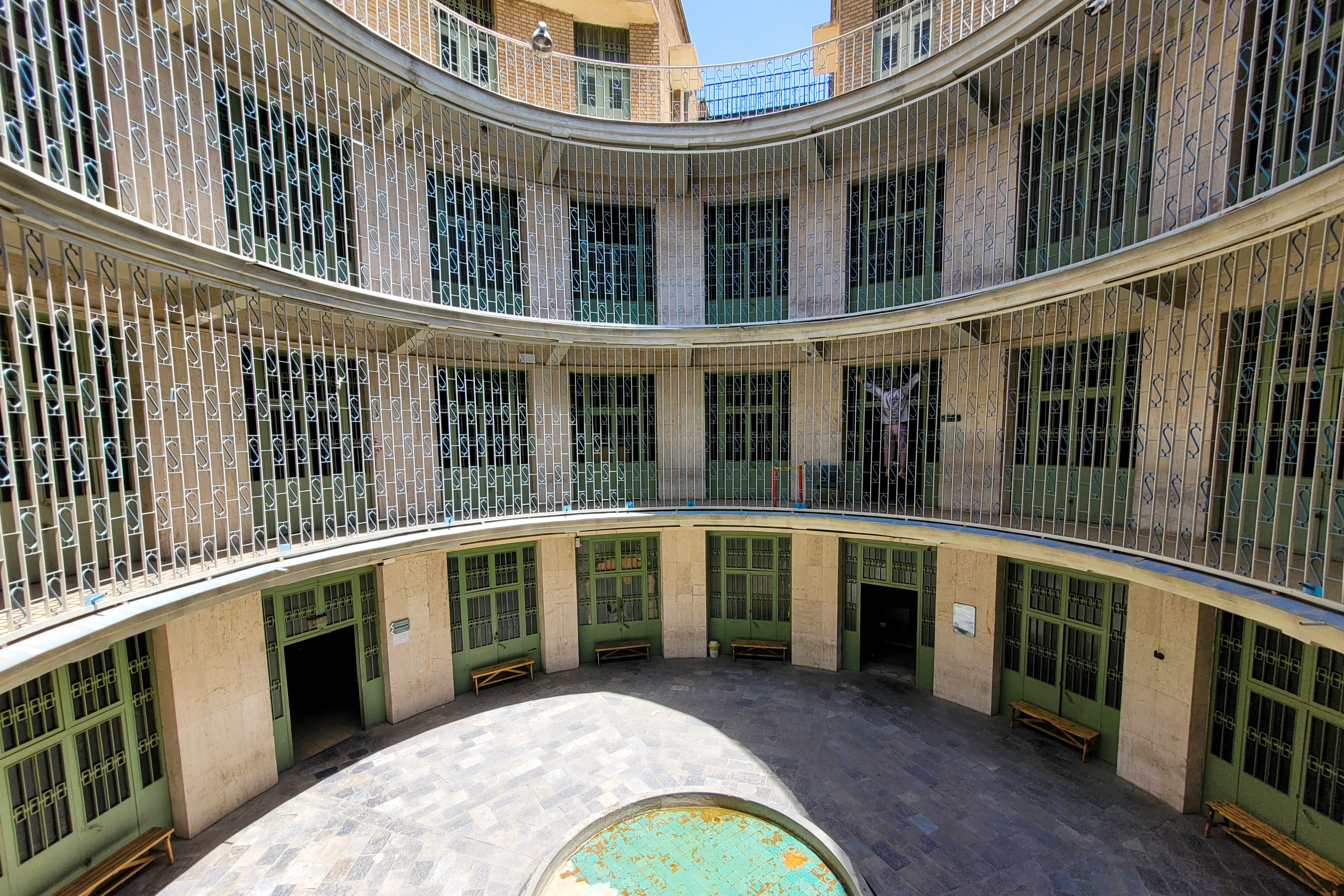

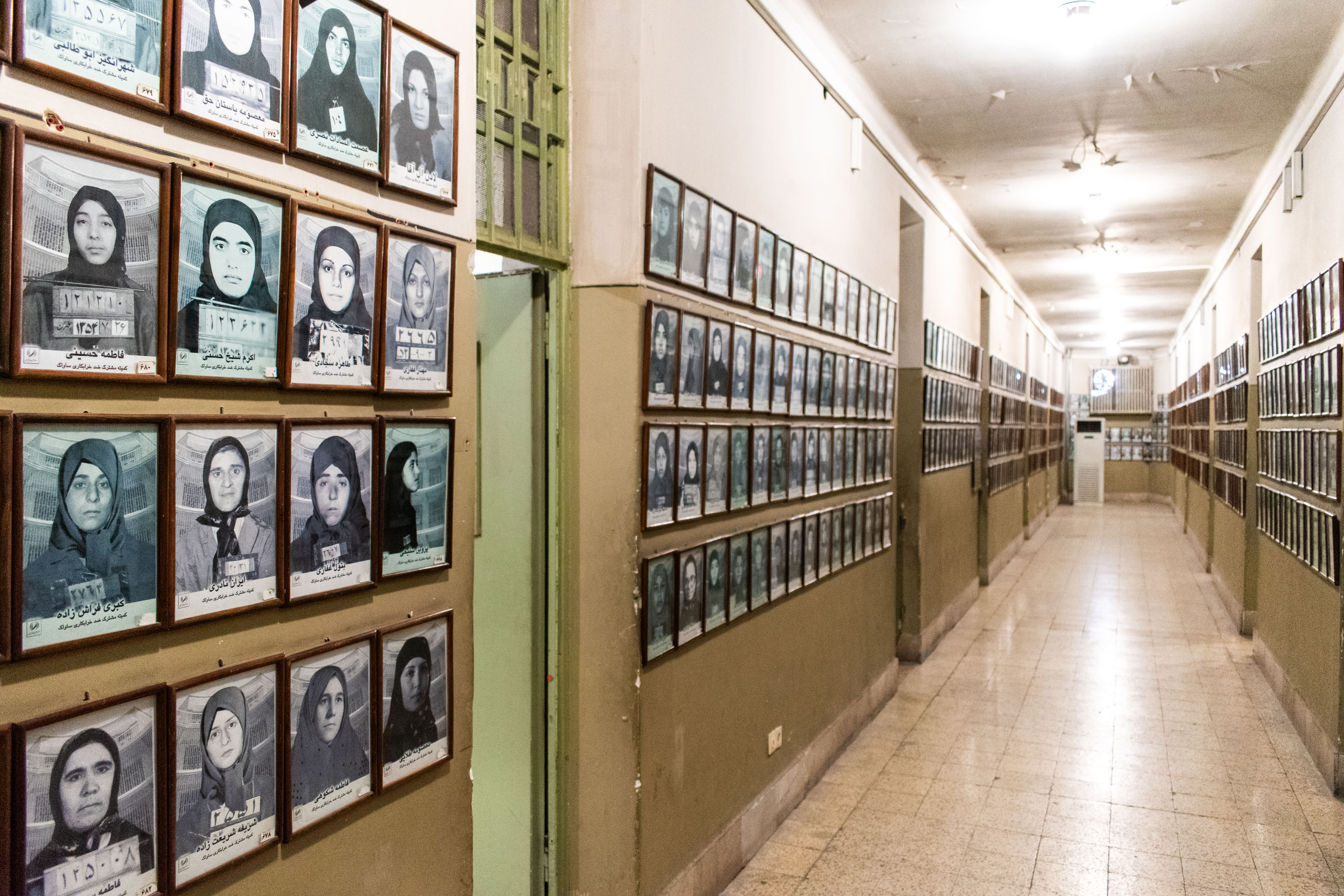
Mugshots of former inmates.

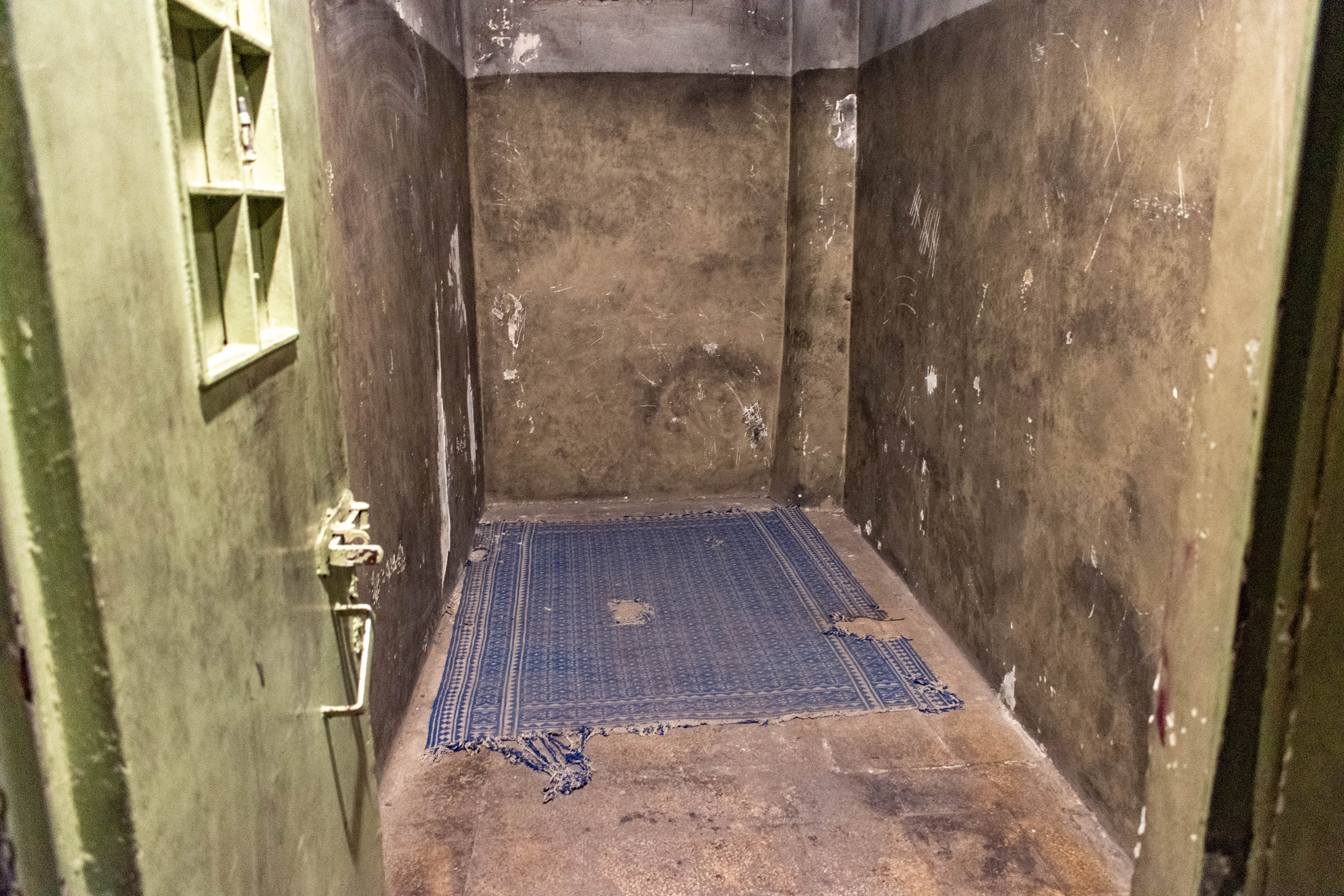
A cell.

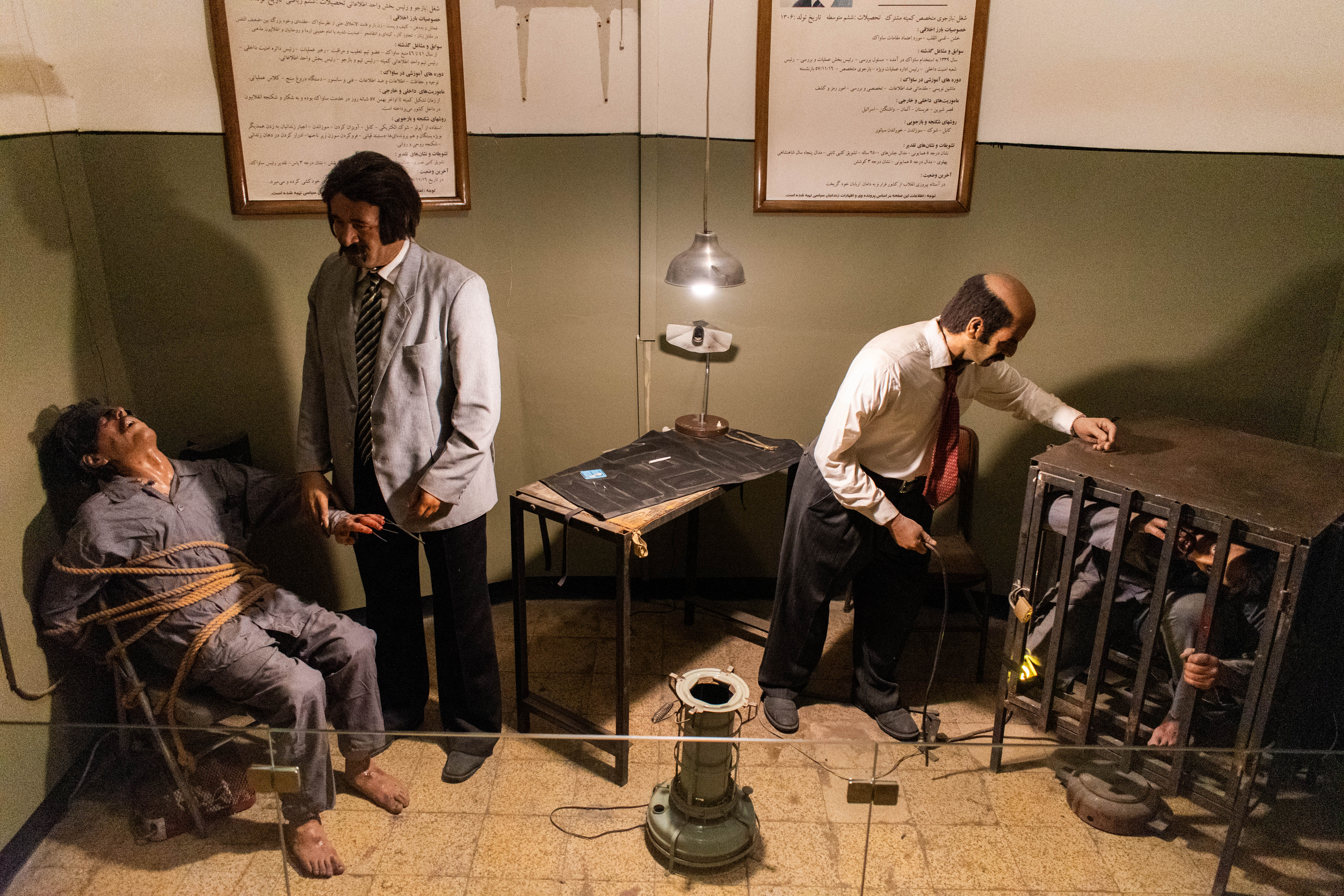
The torture room.

== See also ==
- Qasr Prison
- Evin Prison
