= Prime Ministry Intelligence Office =

Iranian Intelligence Agency (1979–1984)

Agency overview
- Formed: 1979
- Preceding agency: SAVAK
- Dissolved: 18 August 1984
- Superseding agency: Ministry of Intelligence
- Headquarters: Tehran
- Agency executive: Khosrow Tehrani
- Parent department: Prime Minister of Iran

Prime Ministry Intelligence Office (Persian: دفتر اطلاعات نخست‌وزیری) was an Intelligence agency in Iran directly subordinated to the Prime Minister's Office. The agency was formed after Iranian Revolution to be successor to the dissolved SAVAK, and turned into Ministry of Intelligence in 1984. The office was founded by Khosrow Tehrani, and after an agreement with Intelligence Organization of the Islamic Revolutionary Guard Corps, which was mainly focused on foreign intelligence and counter-intelligence.
