= Nematollah Nassiri =

Iranian army officer (1910–1979)

Timsar Nematollah Nassiri
- نعمت‌الله نصیری
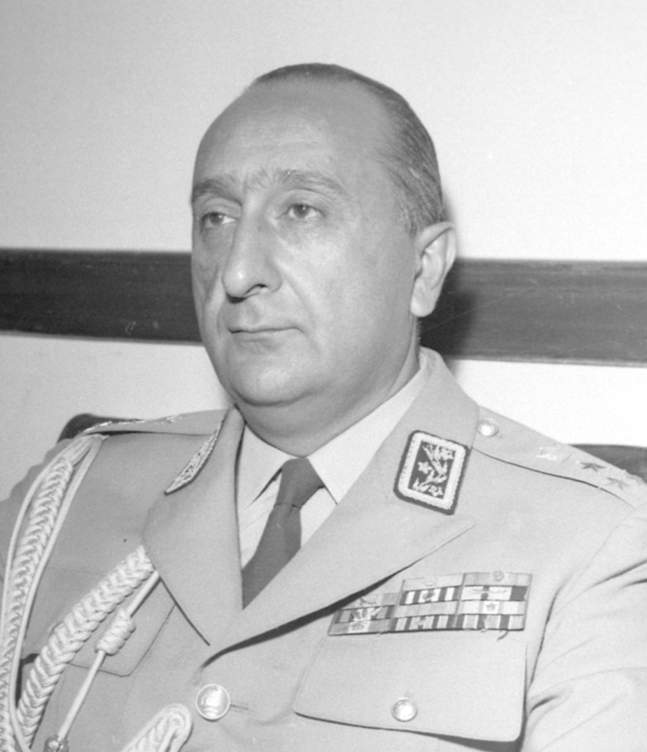
- General Nassiri, c. 1960s

Iranian Ambassdor to Pakistan
- In office 6 June 1978 – 7 October 1978
- Monarch: Mohammad Reza Pahlavi
- Prime Minister: Jamshid Amouzegar; Jafar Sharif-Emami
- Preceded by: Fereydoun Zand Fard
- Succeeded by: Ahmad Minaei

Director of the SAVAK
- In office 26 January 1965 – 6 June 1978
- Monarch: Mohammad Reza Pahlavi
- Prime Minister: Amir-Abbas Hoveyda; Jamshid Amouzegar
- Preceded by: Hassan Pakravan
- Succeeded by: Nasser Moghaddam

Deputy Prime Minister of Iran
- In office 26 January 1965 – 6 June 1978
- Monarch: Mohammad Reza Pahlavi

Chief of the Shahrbani
- In office 23 October 1960 – 25 January 1965
- Monarch: Mohammad Reza Pahlavi
- Prime Minister: Jafar Sharif-Emami; Ali Amini; Asadollah Alam; Hassan Ali Mansur
- Preceded by: Nasser Amir Ansari
- Succeeded by: Mohsen Mobasher

Personal details
- Born: 4 August 1910 Semnan, Qajar Iran
- Died: 15 February 1979 (aged 68) Refah School, Tehran, Iran
- Cause of death: Execution by islamists revolutionaries
- Spouse(s): Parvin Khadjavi (divorced); Zoleikha Khalvati
- Children: 2
- Parent(s): Mohammad Amid od-Molk; Zarin Taj

Military service
- Allegiance: Pahlavi Iran
- Branch/service: Ground Force
- Years of service: 1931–1978
- Rank: General
- Commands: Imperial Guard (1951–1960); Pahlavi Infantry Regiment (1950–1951); Chief of Staff of the Central Military Police; Infantry battalion commander at the Military Officers' Academy; Sirjan Independent Battalion; 2nd Battalion of the 18th Kerman Regiment; Deputy director of the Advanced Training Academy; Platoon and company commander at the Military Officers' Academy; Heavy machine-gun platoon commander

Nematollah Nassiri (Persian: نعمت‌الله نصیری; 4 August 1910 – 15 February 1979) was an Iranian military officer and intelligence chief who served as the third director of SAVAK, the Iranian secret police and Intelligence agency during the rule of Mohammad Reza Pahlavi. He was also the Ambassador of Iran to Pakistan. Nassiri was among the 438 individuals arrested and executed in 1979 following the Iranian Revolution.

== Early life and education ==
Nematollah Nassiri was born on 4 August 1910 in Sangussar, near Semnan. He was a rumored adherent of the Baháʼí Faith, despite denials by the religion of him being a Bahá’í. He received secondary education in Tehran. In 1929, he was enrolled in an army officer school. Nassiri was a classmate of then-Crown Prince Mohammad Reza Pahlavi, which in turn played an important role in his career.

== Career ==
Nassiri's career began in the rank of lieutenant of the 2nd class (rank), quickly rising through the ranks of the service in the ground forces.

In 1949, with the rank of lieutenant-colonel, Nassiri became governor of Kerman province.

Nassiri served as the commander of the Iranian Imperial Guards during the Pahlavi era. He was arrested by the followers of Prime Minister Mohammad Mosaddegh when he delivered two decrees of the Shah to the prime minister. A personal friend of the Shah, Nassiri participated in the 1953 Iranian coup d'état which removed Prime Minister Mosaddegh from power. Nassiri was appointed head of SAVAK following the failure of General Hassan Pakravan, the previous director, to prevent the assassination of Prime Minister Hassan Ali Mansur on 21 January 1965. He was also made deputy prime minister. He served in the post until 6 June 1978 when he was dismissed by the Shah. Nassiri was then appointed ambassador of Iran to Pakistan.

The proximity to the Shah and his entourage allowed Nassiri to quickly become one of the richest people in Iran. By the early 1970s Nassiri was already the richest landowner on the entire coast of the Caspian Sea.

== Director of SAVAK ==
At the end of January 1965, the Shah appointed Nassiri to the post of director of SAVAK, after General Hassan Pakravan was removed from this post due to the fact that under his leadership, SAVAK was unable to prevent the assassination of Prime Minister Hassan Ali Mansur.

In his book "SAVAK – the secret police of Shah Mohammed Reza Pahlavi (1957–1979)" author Vasily Papava described the appointment of Nassiri to the post of head of the secret service as follows: “There are several explanations for this appointment. Closest to the truth, probably the following. The Shah was concerned about the growing authority of the left-wing forces in the country... Pahlavi, also not without reason, was afraid of the growing authority of the military, especially the generals and senior officers, who became “heroes” after the August revolution of 1953. It should be taken into account that in the period of 1950-1960s, in many countries of the region, as a result of a coup d'état, the military came to power who overthrew the "pro-Western" secular regimes and established a military dictatorship. That is why the shah needed a new leader of the political police who had left the military environment and was well aware of what measures should be taken to protect the throne from usurping power from the army”.

On 5 October 1971, coinciding with the 2,500-year celebration of the Persian Empire, he was promoted to the rank of General.

Nasiri was removed from the office of Ambassador to Pakistan on 7 October 1978, where he had been transferred after being removed as Director of SAVAK.

=== Modernisation of SAVAK ===
Mohammed Reza Pahlavi gave General Nassiri instructions to restore the effectiveness of the SAVAK secret police and to properly serve the monarch.

General Nematollah Nassiri ideally coped with the task set before him by the Shah: in the shortest possible time, a rather complex and comprehensive system of total investigation and denunciation was created, which controlled all aspects of the political and public life of Iran.

The main focus of the activities of the Shah special services was aimed at combating the "red danger" of communism and socialism. At the same time, in 1968, Nematollah Nassiri showed interest in establishing contacts with the Soviet Union through the channels of special services, in particular in the acquisition of “counter-intelligence equipment” in the USSR.

One of Nassiri’s main achievements as head of SAVAK was the elimination of the Shah’s opponent, Lieutenant General Teymur Bakhtiar, the first director of SAVAK. The development of a special operation plan to eliminate Bakhtiar and its execution by the SAVAK agents was personally supervised by General Nassiri, directly agreeing with the Shah regarding all the details of this operation. On 12 August 1970, Teymur Bakhtiar was assassinated in Iraq by SAVAK agents sent there.

== Arrest and execution ==
On 6 June 1978, General Nematollah Nassiri was relieved of his post as head of the SAVAK and appointed ambassador to Pakistan. His place was taken by Lieutenant General Nasser Moghaddam, who for many years headed SAVAK's "Department III".

With the constant development of the Iranian Revolution, the Parliament as Shahpour Bakhtiar's reforms ordered the dissolution of SAVAK when Nassiri was called back from Pakistan by the Shah. He was arrested together with 60 other former officials on 8 November 1978, including high-ranking officials, such as former director of SAVAK Hassan Pakravan and former Prime Minister Amir-Abbas Hoveyda. When the Shah left Iran on 16 January 1979, Nassiri remained in prison until the fall of Shapour Bakhtiar's government on 11 February.

On 15 February, Nassiri was arrested by revolutionaries and brought to the Refah School with other officials. He was tried in a Revolutionary Tribunal along with 24 other individuals for a total of 10 hours and was charged – without any defence or concrete evidence of guilt – with corruption on earth, massacre of people, torture, and treason. He was sentenced to death at 10 p.m. and after the sentence was confirmed by Ayatollah Khomeini he was executed by firing squad at 11:45 p.m. His property was subsequently confiscated.

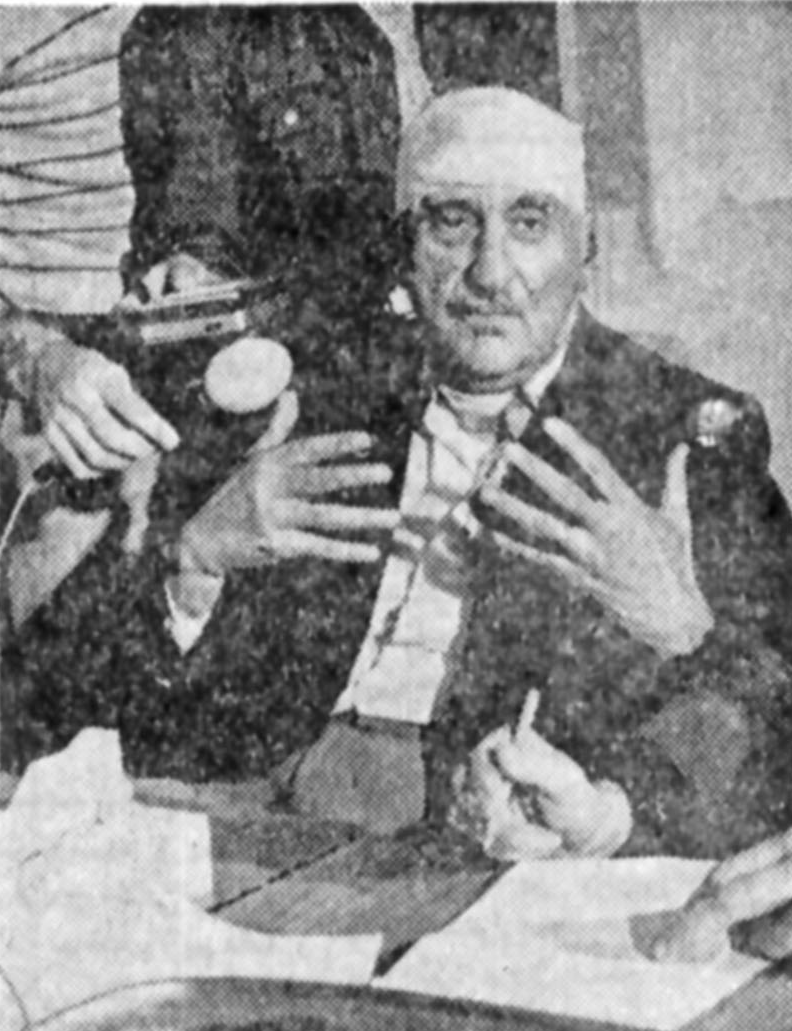
On his way to the Refah School after his arrest, Nassiri was injured and had to be bandaged around his head and chin.

Government offices
Preceded by Hassan Pakravan	Director of the National Organization for Security and Intelligence; 1965−1978	Succeeded by Nasser Moghaddam
