= Hassan Pakravan =

Iranian army officer, diplomat and politician

Timsar Hassan Pakravan
- حسن پاکروان
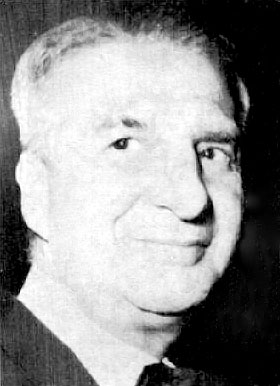
- Pakravan in the 1970s

Senior Counselor to the Ministry of the Royal Court
- In office 1974–1979
- Monarch: Mohammad Reza Pahlavi
- Prime Minister: Amir-Abbas Hoveyda; Jamshid Amouzegar; Jafar Sharif-Emami; Gholam Reza Azhari; Shapour Bakhtiar

Ambassador to France
- In office 1969–1973
- Monarch: Mohammad Reza Pahlavi
- Prime Minister: Amir-Abbas Hoveyda
- Preceded by: Massoud Jahanbani
- Succeeded by: Amir Shilatifard

Ambassador to Pakistan
- In office 1966–1969
- Monarch: Mohammad Reza Pahlavi
- Prime Minister: Amir-Abbas Hoveyda
- Preceded by: Houshang Ansari
- Succeeded by: Mohammad Hossein Mashayekh Fereydani

Minister of Information
- In office 27 January 1965 – 11 July 1966
- Monarch: Mohammad Reza Pahlavi
- Prime Minister: Amir-Abbas Hoveyda
- Preceded by: Nusratullah Muinian
- Succeeded by: Hushang Ansary

Deputy Prime minister
- In office 26 February 1961 – 26 January 1965

Director of SAVAK
- In office 26 February 1961 – 26 January 1965
- Monarch: Mohammad Reza Pahlavi
- Prime Minister: Jafar Sharif-Emami; Ali Amini; Asadollah Alam; Hassan Ali Mansur
- Preceded by: Teymur Bakhtiar
- Succeeded by: Nematollah Nassiri

Deputy Chief in charge of External Affairs of Savak
- In office 12 March 1957 – 26 February 1961
- Monarch: Mohammad Reza Pahlavi
- Prime Minister: Hossein Ala'; Manouchehr Eghbal; Jafar Sharif-Emami

military attaché in India
- In office 1954–1957
- Monarch: Mohammad Reza Pahlavi
- Prime Minister: Fazlollah Zahedi; Hossein Ala'

Director of the Second Bureau
- In office 1953–1954
- Monarch: Mohammad Reza Pahlavi
- Prime Minister: Mohammad Mosaddegh; Fazlollah Zahedi
- Preceded by: Hossein Siasi
- Succeeded by: Mostafa Amjadi

military attaché in France
- In office 1952–1953
- Monarch: Mohammad Reza Pahlavi
- Prime Minister: Mohammad Sa'ed; Ali Mansur

military attaché in Pakistan
- In office 1949–1950
- Monarch: Mohammad Reza Pahlavi
- Prime Minister: Ahmad Qavam; Mohammad Mosaddegh

Personal details
- Born: 4 August 1911 Tehran, Qajar Iran
- Died: 11 April 1979 (aged 67) Qasr Prison, Tehran, Iran
- Children: Saïdeh Pakravan
- Education: Officers' School; École d'application de l'artillerie et du génie

Military service
- Allegiance: Pahlavi Iran
- Branch/service: Imperial Iranian Army
- Years of service: 1933–1978
- Rank: Major General
- Commands: Bushehr Garrison (1941–1949); Border Guard (1955–1957)
- Battles/wars: 1953 Iranian coup d'état 1963 demonstrations in Iran

Hassan Pakravan (4 August 1911 – 11 April 1979) was a well-known diplomat and minister in the Pahlavi pre-revolutionary government of Iran. He is not only notable for his political involvement with the Mohammad Reza Pahlavi government and SAVAK, but also his relationship with Ruhollah Khomeini.

== Early life and education ==
Hassan Pakravan, son of Fathollah and Amineh Pakravan, was born in Tehran on 4 August 1911 (13 Mordad 1290 AP). His father held many high government posts, including governor of Khorasan province and ambassador to Italy. His mother, partly of European descent, was a professor at the University of Tehran. She was awarded the prestigious French Prix Rivarol, which the French government gives to foreign authors who write directly in French. She was related to the Habsburg rulers of the Austro-Hungarian empire.

As a child, Pakravan accompanied his parents to Cairo, where his father was appointed diplomatic agent. There, he received his primary education at the Lycée Français. He was then sent to Liège, Belgium where he attended high school and university. Pakravan then studied at the artillery school in Poitiers, France, and the Ecole d’Application d’Artillerie in Fontainebleau.

== Career ==
Pakravan returned to Iran in 1933 and taught as an instructor at the Officers' Academy for eight years. In the years 1941–1949, he was the commander of the Bushehr Garrison and the security officer of the southern ports

Then in 1949, with the rank of Colonel, he went to Pakistan as Iran's military attaché for two years. After returning to Iran, Pakravan was appointed as the Head of the Second Department of the Army Staff from 1953 to 1954. On January 7, 1952, the Legion of Honour medal was presented to Pakravan by the French Embassy in Tehran for his efforts in developing relations between Iran and France. The following year, Pakravan went to France as a military attaché for a period. During the premiership of Mohammad Mosaddegh and the August 19, 1953 coup, Pakravan held the leadership of the Second Department of the Army Staff, and in 1955, with the rank of Brigadier General, he went to India as Iran's military attaché. In 1955, Pakravan took over the command of the country's Border Guard.

In the 1940-1970s, Hassan Pakravan held many politically important, military and diplomatic posts, among them:

- military attaché in Pakistan (1949–1950);
- military attaché in France (1952–1953)
- chief of the Second Bureau (1953–1954);
- military attaché in India (1954–1957);
- deputy chief of the State Intelligence and Security Organization in charge of external affairs (1957–1961);
- deputy prime minister and chief of SAVAK (1961–1965);
- minister of information (1965–1966);
- ambassador to Pakistan (1966–1969);
- ambassador to France (1969–1973);
- senior counselor to the Ministry of Court (1974–1979).

Pakravan was known for being more compassionate than any of National Security and Information Department's other directors. However, Mohammad Reza Shah replaced Pakravan with his childhood friend Nematollah Nassiri in 1965. He returned to Iran in 1976 and was brought out of retirement in 1978 by the Shah in a last-ditch effort to curb corruption at the Royal Court. Pakravan's supporters noted his aristocratic and impeccable character as well as his intelligence and moral courage to be a source of consolation at the difficult times of 1978–79 when the Iranian Revolution took control of the opposition and eventually seized power.

== Head of SAVAK ==
One of his first decisions as head of SAVAK was to refrain from any form of torture during interrogations.

=== Relationship with Ayatollah Khomeini ===
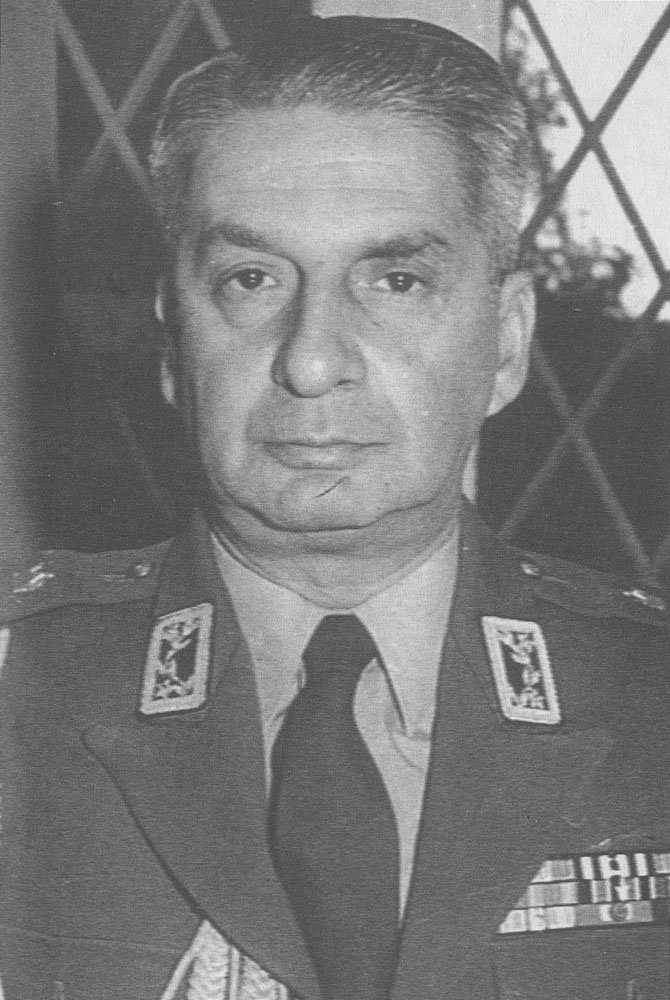
Hassan Pakravan in General Uniform

One of the more fascinating segments of the memoirs of General Pakravan's wife is the description of her husband's weekly luncheons with Ayatollah Ruhollah Khomeini in 1963, when the Ayatollah was under house arrest.

According to General Pakravan, "The ayatollah used to say in this very flowery Eastern way, 'Timsar [General], I count the days until we reach the day of our luncheon.'" He described the ayatollah as, very handsome, someone with extraordinary presence, a power of seduction and great charisma. They talked about religion, philosophy, and history. General Pakravan also found him to be very ambitious and secretive. "So much so that it made my hair stand on end. It was frightening," he told his wife.

Mrs. Pakravan confirms the well-known story that her husband saved Ayatollah Khomeini's life in 1963. He was condemned to death and General Pakravan was upset by that. Pakravan felt that Khomeini's execution would anger the common people of Iran. He knew that the population of the country was not its elite. He presented his argument to the Shah. Once he had convinced the Shah to allow him to find a way out, he called on Ayatollah Kazem Shariatmadari, one of the senior religious leaders of Iran, and asked for his help. Ayatollah Shariatmadari suggested that Khomeini be made a Grand Ayatollah. So, they made a religious decree which was taken by General Pakravan and Seyyed Jalal Tehrani to the Shah.

== Arrest and death ==
After the Iranian Revolution, Pakravan was among the first of the Shah's officials to be executed. He was not allowed to have access to a lawyer and the charges filed against him were vague. Given the fact that he was retired at the time of the revolution, his execution seemed all the more unjust. Pakravan was a key player in convincing the Shah to commute the death sentence on Khomeini in 1963 and instead sending him to exile. Khomeini was first sent to Turkey, and then to Iraq, where he stayed until his expulsion and relocation to France in 1978.

In her memoirs, Mrs. Pakravan provides the description of the arrest, imprisonment, and execution of her husband by the Islamic Revolutionary Court. She argues that General Pakravan was taken from his house to an unknown destination. When his son tried to contact him, he was told that the general was not arrested at all but that he was the guest of the Ayatollah. But in fact he was imprisoned shortly after his arrest.

After his death sentence was read in mid-April 1979, Pakravan told the judges that he had accepted all the responsibilities then, and he accepted them now.

Government offices
Preceded by Teymur Bakhtiar	Director of the National Organization for Security and Intelligence; 1961−1965	Succeeded by Nematollah Nassiri
