= Second Bureau of Imperial Iranian Army =

Iranian military intelligence agency (1926–1979)

Second Bureau
- رکن دوم; Rokn-e-Dovvom

Agency overview
- Formed: 1926; 100 years ago
- Dissolved: 1979; 47 years ago
- Superseding agency: Intelligence Protection Organization of the Islamic Republic of Iran Army Deputy Intelligence Office of the Army of the Islamic Republic of Iran
- Jurisdiction: Government of Iran
- Headquarters: Tehran, Iran
- Agency executive: Pervez Amini Afshar, Director

Imperial Iranian Army's Second Bureau (Persian: رکن دوم; Rokn-e-Dovvom) was an Iranian military intelligence agency during the Pahlavi dynasty from 1926 to 1979.

== Establishment and structure ==
Second Bureau was one of the four main bureaus operating in the army alongside First Bureau, responsible for Human resources, Third Bureau, responsible for operations and Fourth Bureau responsible for logistics. It was active since reign of Reza Shah and received information from military attachés in target countries. Modeled after the Deuxième Bureau, the French elite officers who were teaching at War University and Officers' School before World War II were founders of Iran's military intelligence service. The service was later contributed by British secret services.

On 7 September 1955, the "Intelligence Bureau of Imperial Iranian Army Headquarters" (Persian: اداره اطلاعات ستاد ارتش شاهنشاهی ایران) was established.

During reign of Mohammad Reza Shah, the agency directly reported to him.

== Role ==
Alongside acting as the military intelligence apparatus of the army and conducting counterintelligence operations, it was responsible for internal security and surveillance work involving military personnel, as well as civilians. The unit's operations was parallel to those of Shahrbani and Ministry of Interior. Until 1953 Iranian coup d'état, it was considered Iran's sole intelligence agency.

After Organization of Intelligence and National Security (SAVAK) was established, it had close ties to the military. Although some of army intelligence officers were transferred to SAVAK and some simultaneously served in both agencies; an interservice rivalry emerged between the two and even became an open secret to people.

== Directors ==
- Abdolreza Afkham Ebrahimi (1932 – 1934)
- Mohsen Diba (1934 – ?)
- Abbasgholi Esfandiari (?)
- Ali Riazi (around 1941)
- Hasan Arfa (1942 – ?)
- Habibollah Deyhimi (?)
- Hassan Akhavi (? – 1945)
- Colonel Saqafi (1945 – 1946)
- Bizhan Gilanshah (1946 – ?)
- Ali-Ashraf Motahari (1950 – ?)
- Hussein Siasi (? – 1953)
- Hassan Pakravan (1953 – 1954)
- Mustafa Amjadi (1954)
- Mohammad-Vali Gharani (1954 – 1956)
- Haj Ali Kia (1956 – 17 March 1961)
- Azizullah Kamal (17 March 1961–?)
- Azizullah Palizban (? – 19 April 1973)
- Nasser Moghaddam (19 April 1973 – 7 June 1978)
- Naser Qoli Boroumand Jezi (7 June 1978 – 1978)
- Pervez Amini Afshar (1978 – 11 February 1979)

Head of the Second Directorate of the Joint Staff of the Islamic Republic of Iran Army

- Hedayatollah Hatami (24 February 1979–1980)
- Mohammad Mehdi Katibeh (1980–1986)
- Colonel Shahvardian (?)
- Mohammad-Hassan Nami (?)

Deputy Head of Intelligence of the Islamic Republic of Iran Army

- Amir Hatami (1998 – 2005)
- Abbas Ali Mansouri Arani (?)
- Seyyed Hamidreza Tabatabaei (?)
- Abbas Jafarinia (?)

== See also ==
- SAVAK
