= SAVAK =

Iranian intelligence agency and secret police (1957–1979)

Bureau for Intelligence and Security of the State
- سازمان اطلاعات و امنیت کشور
- Seal, incorporating the words "S.A.V.A.K. 1335" in the bottom (1335 being the Solar Hijri equivalent of 1957 CE)

Agency overview
- Formed: 12 March 1957
- Preceding agency: Shahrbani Intelligence Department
- Dissolved: 12 February 1979 (de facto); 1 April 1979 (de jure)
- Superseding agency: Prime Ministry Intelligence Office
- Type: Secret police Intelligence agency
- Headquarters: Tehran, Iran
- Employees: 5,000 at peak
- Agency executives: Teymur Bakhtiar (first); Nasser Moghaddam (last)

The Bureau for Intelligence and Security of the State, (Note: Persian: سازمان اطلاعات و امنیت کشور, romanized: Sâzmân-e Ettelâ'ât va Amniyyat-e Kešvar) shortened to SAVAK (Note: Persian: ساواک, romanized: Sâvâk) or S.A.V.A.K., (Note: Persian: س.ا.و.ا.ک.) was the intelligence agency and secret police of the Imperial State of Iran from 1957 to 1979.

SAVAK was established in Tehran in 1957 by national security law. The French intelligence service, the SDECE, assisted in establishing and training SAVAK during its formative years in the mid-1950s and early 1960s. French instructors provided courses in surveillance, counter-subversion, interrogation techniques, and political intelligence gathering – expertise refined during the Algerian War.

According to a declassified CIA memo citing a classified U.S. Senate Foreign Relations Committee report, the CIA played a significant role in establishing SAVAK, providing both funding and training. The organization became notorious for its extensive surveillance, repression, and torture of political dissidents. The Shah used SAVAK to arrest, imprison, exile, and torture opponents of the state. This caused discontent which was leveraged by Ayatollah Ruhollah Khomeini, then in exile, to build popular support for his Islamic philosophy.

At its peak, SAVAK reportedly employed approximately 5,000 agents operating under the Pahlavi dynasty. Iranian-American scholar and ex-politician Gholam Reza Afkhami estimates that SAVAK had between 4,000 and 6,000 members, while TIME stated in a publication on 19 February 1979 that the agency had 5,000 members.

== History ==
=== 1957–1971 ===
After the 1953 Iranian coup d'état, Prime Minister Mohammad Mosaddegh was removed. He was originally focused on nationalizing Iran's oil industry but had also set out to weaken the Shah's power. After the coup, the monarch, Mohammad Reza Shah, established an intelligence service with police powers. The Shah's goal was to strengthen his regime by placing political opponents under surveillance and repressing dissident movements. According to Encyclopædia Iranica:

A U.S. Army colonel working for the CIA was sent to Persia in September 1953 to work with General Teymur Bakhtiar, who was appointed military governor of Tehran in December 1953, and immediately began to assemble the nucleus of a new intelligence organization. The U.S. Army colonel worked closely with Bakhtīār and his subordinates, commanding the new intelligence organization and training its members in basic intelligence techniques, such as surveillance and interrogation methods, the use of intelligence networks, and organizational security. This organization was the first modern, effective intelligence service to operate in Persia. Its main achievement occurred in September 1954, when it discovered and destroyed a large communist Tudeh Party network that had been established in the Persian armed forces.

In March 1955, the Army colonel was "replaced with a more permanent team of five career Central Intelligence Agency (CIA) officers, including specialists in covert operations, intelligence analysis, and counterintelligence, including Major General Herbert Norman Schwarzkopf who "trained virtually all of the first generation of SAVAK personnel". In October 1956, news of the intended establishment of an agency was reported by state media and in 1965, this agency was reorganized and given the name Sazeman-e Ettela'at va Amniyat-e Keshvar (SAVAK). These in turn were replaced by SAVAK's own instructors in 1965.

SAVAK had the power to censor the media, screen applicants for government jobs, and "according to a reliable Western source, use all means necessary, including torture, to hunt down dissidents". After 1963, the Shah expanded his security organizations, including SAVAK, which grew to over 5,300 full-time agents and a large but unknown number of part-time informers.

In 1961, the Iranian authorities dismissed the agency's first director, Lieutenant General Teymur Bakhtiar, and he later became a political dissident. In 1970, SAVAK agents assassinated him, disguising it as an accident.

Major General Hassan Pakravan was director of SAVAK from 1961 to 1965. Pakravan was replaced in 1965 by General Nematollah Nassiri, a close associate of the Shah.

Throughout the 1960s, some agents in SAVAK started to consider financial corruption as a matter of financial security and monitored not only the fiscal activities of the political and economic elite of Iran, but also the royal family. Mohammad Reza Pahlavi was reportedly angered by these SAVAK reports due to its contents and the belief that the security agents were prying into private matters beyond their purview.

=== Siahkal attack and after ===
A turning point in SAVAK's reputation for ruthless brutality was reportedly an attack on a gendarmerie post in the Caspian village of Siahkal by a small band of armed Marxists in February 1971, although it is also reported to have tortured to death a Shia cleric, Ayatollah Muhammad Reza Sa'idi, in 1970. According to Iranian political historian Ervand Abrahamian, after this attack SAVAK interrogators were sent abroad for "scientific training to prevent unwanted deaths from 'brute force.'" Brute force was supplemented with the bastinado; sleep deprivation; extensive solitary confinement; glaring searchlights; standing in one place for hours on end; nail extractions; snakes (favored for use with women); electrical shocks with cattle prods, often into the rectum; cigarette burns; sitting on hot grills; acid dripped into nostrils; near-drownings; mock executions; and an electric chair with a large metal mask to muffle screams while amplifying them for the victim. This latter contraption was dubbed the Apollo—an allusion to the American spacecraft of the same name. Prisoners were also humiliated by being raped, urinated on, and forced to stand naked. Despite the new 'scientific' methods, the torture of choice remained the traditional bastinado used to beat soles of the feet. The "primary goal" of those using the bastinados "was to locate arms caches, safe houses and accomplices ..."

Abrahamian estimates that SAVAK (and other police and military) killed 368 guerrillas including the leadership of the major urban guerrilla organizations (Organization of Iranian People's Fedai Guerrillas, People's Mojahedin of Iran) such as Hamid Ashraf between 1971–1977 and executed up to 100 political prisoners between 1971 and 1979 – the most violent era of the SAVAK's existence.

One well known writer was arrested, tortured for months, and finally placed before television cameras to 'confess' that his works paid too much attention to social problems and not enough to the great achievements of the White Revolution. By the end of 1975, twenty-two prominent poets, novelist, professors, theater directors, and film makers were in jail for criticizing the regime. And many others had been physically attacked for refusing to cooperate with the authorities.

The repression was softened thanks to publicity and scrutiny by "numerous international organizations and foreign newspapers." Jimmy Carter became president of the United States and he raised the issue of human rights in Pahlavi Iran. Overnight prison conditions changed. Inmates dubbed this the dawn of "jimmykrasy".

== Leadership ==
=== Directors ===
No.	Portrait	Director	Took office	Left office	Time in office
1	Teymur Bakhtiar	Timsar; Teymur Bakhtiar (1914–1970)	12 March 1957	26 February 1961	3 years
2	Hassan Pakravan	Timsar; Hassan Pakravan (1911–1979)	26 February 1961	26 January 1965	3 years
3	Nematollah Nassiri	Timsar; Nematollah Nassiri (1911–1979)	26 January 1965	6 June 1978	13 years, 131 days
4	Nasser Moghaddam	Timsar; Nasser Moghaddam (1921–1979)	7 June 1978	12 February 1979	250 days

=== Deputy Directors ===
No.	Portrait	Director	Took office	Left office	Time in office
1	Hassan Alavikia	Timsar; Hassan Alavikia (1910–2013)	12 March 1957	19 November 1962	5 years
2	Hossein Fardoust	Timsar; Hossein Fardoust (1917–1987)	19 November 1962	12 April 1973	10 years
–	Nasser Moghaddam	Timsar; Nasser Moghaddam (1921–1979); Acting	12 April 1973	19 April 1973	7 days
3	Ali Motazed	Timsar; Ali Motazed (1912–2000)	19 April 1973	6 June 1978	5 years, 48 days
4	Parviz Sabeti	Parviz Sabeti (born 1936)	6 June 1978	12 February 1979	251 days

=== Directors of SAVAK Directorates ===
First Directorate

- Colonel Manoochehr Zarabi (12 March 1957 – July 1961)
- Brigadier General Abolhassan Sa'adatmand (July 1961 – March 1965)
- Brigadier General Seifollah Forouzin (March 1965 – July 1978)
- Colonel Naser Zarabi (July 1978 – 12 February 1979)

Second Directorate

- Abdul-Hossein Larijani (12 March 1957 – February 1958)
- Rear Admiral Ahmad Azima (February 1958 – September 1960)
- Brigadier General Mohammad Ali Ansari (October 1960 – February 1961)
- Brigadier General Ali Motazed (August 1961 – October 1962)
- Brigadier General Mansour Ghadr (October 1962 – September 1963)
- Colonel Mansour Negahbani (November 1963 – January 1964)
- Brigadier General Ali Akbar Farazian (March 1968 – December 1978)
- Brigadier General Mohammad Khani (January 1979 – 12 February 1979)

Third Directorate

- Brigadier General Abdolali Mahoutian (1957)
- Brigadier General Samad Samadianpour (1957 – 1959)
- Brigadier General Baba Amjadi (1959 – July 9, 1960)
- Brigadier General Mostafa Amjadi (July 9, 1960 – 5 June 1963)
- Brigadier General Nasser Moghaddam (5 June 1963 – 12 April 1973)
- Parviz Sabeti (12 April 1973 – 31 October 1978)
- Ali Tabatabaei (31 October 1978 – 12 February 1979)

Fourth Directorate

- Brigadier General Hassan Heydari Zanganeh (12 March 1957 – February 1959)
- Brigadier General Mostafa Amjadi (February 1959 – July 1960)
- Brigadier General Moradian (August 1960 – March 1962)
- Brigadier General Eyni Zaltash (July 1962 – April 1966)
- Brigadier General Asghar Kangarloo (July 1966 – July 1978)
- Seifollah Shahab (July 1978 – 12 February 1979)

Fifth Directorate

- Brigadier General Mohammad Ali Ansari (12 March 1957 – September 1963)
- Brigadier General Mohammad Ayromlou (October 1963 – November 1964)
- Brigadier General Ahmad Ali Mohagheghi (November 1964 – November 1965)
- Brigadier General Mehdi Saedi (November 1965 – 12 February 1979)

Sixth Directorate

- Colonel Ali Asghar Fararian (12 March 1957 – August 1961)
- Brigadier General Hassan Heydari Zanganeh (August 1961 – June 1978)
- Major General Mahmoud Vaziri Hamedani (October 1978 – 12 February 1979)

Seventh Directorate

- Rear Admiral Farajollah Rasaei (12 March 1957 – September 1959)
- Brigadier General Mohammad Ayromlou (September 1959 – September 1960)
- Rear Admiral Ahmad Azima (September 1960 – May 1961)
- Colonel Ebrahim Mahdavi (June 1961 – January 1965)
- Brigadier General Ali Mohammad Kaveh (February 1965 – July 1978)
- Brigadier General Reza Parvaresh (November 1978 – 12 February 1979)

Eighth Directorate

- Colonel Ali Ghafouri (12 March 1957 – September 1961)
- Brigadier General Naser Nomani (September 1961 – September 1963)
- Brigadier General Manouchehr Hashemi (September 1963 – October 1978)
- Ali Asefi (October 1978 – 12 February 1979)

Ninth Directorate

- Brigadier General Naser Nomani (October 1963 – February 1966)
- Brigadier General Asghar Kangarloo (February 1966 – July 1967)
- Colonel Naser Zarabi (July 1967 – September 1978)
- Dr. Malek (September 1978 – 12 February 1979)

Health & Medical Directorate

- Dr. Mohammad Baghaei Yazdi (1957 – 1960)
- Colonel Dr. Farhad (1961 – 1962)
- Brigadier General Mehdi Latifi (1962 – June 1978)
- Brigadier General Dr. Alavizadeh (June 1978 – 1978)
- Brigadier General Dr. Hossein Emami (1978 – 12 February 1979)

Education Directorate

- Colonel Nooraei (1957 – 1962)
- Colonel Pir Shafiee (1962 – June 1967)
- Brigadier General Mohammad Reza Keyvani (June 1967 – January 1979)
- Jabal Ameli (January 1979 – 12 February 1979)

== Organization ==
SAVAK was divided into 9 directorates:

- First General Directorate: Cadres, Courses, Ceremonies, Correspondence and Secretariat
- Second General Directorate: Foreign Intelligence
- Third General Directorate: Internal Security
- Fourth General Directorate: Security Within SAVAK
- Fifth General Directorate: Technical Affairs
- Sixth General Directorate: Administration
- Seventh General Directorate: Liaison with other Agencies
- Eighth General Directorate: Counterintelligence
- The Ninth General Directorate: Archives, Passport Department

== Number of employees ==
Over the years, the question of the number of employees of SAVAK has been the subject of debate by many historians and researchers. Given the fact that Iran has never disclosed data on the number of employees of the secret agency – many historians gave conflicting figures for the number of SAVAK personnel – 6,000, 20,000, 30,000 and 60,000.

In one of his interviews, on February 4, 1974, the Shah stated that he did not know the exact number of employees of SAVAK. However, he estimated their total number to be less than 2,000 employees. To the frequently asked question about "torture and atrocities" in SAVAK, the shah answered negatively, designating newspaper reports about the "arbitrariness and cruelty of SAVAK" as a lie and slander. Leaflets circulated after the Islamic Revolution indicated that 15,000 Iranians officially served in SAVAK, as well as many unofficial employees.

== Operations ==
During the height of its power, SAVAK had virtually unlimited powers. It operated its own detention centers, such as Evin Prison. In addition to domestic security, the service's tasks extended to the surveillance of Iranians abroad, notably in the United States, France, and the United Kingdom, and especially students on government stipends. The agency also closely collaborated with the CIA by sending their agents to an air force base in New York to share and discuss interrogation tactics.

Teymur Bakhtiar was assassinated by SAVAK agents in 1970, and Mansur Rafizadeh, SAVAK's United States director during the 1970s, reported that General Nassiri's phone was tapped. Mansur Rafizadeh later wrote of his life as a SAVAK man and detailed the human rights violations of the Shah in his book Witness: From the Shah to the Secret Arms Deal: An Insider's Account of U.S. Involvement in Iran. Mansur Rafizadeh was suspected to have been a double agent also working for the CIA.

SAVAK was additionally involved in supporting Jamiat-e Islami militants during the 1975 Panjshir Valley uprising and 1975 Laghman uprising in the Republic of Afghanistan, in collaboration with Pakistani ISI, although Afghan–Iranian relations later improved in 1976 under Mohammad Daoud Khan. Two days before the Saur Revolution in 1978, the KGB were informed of the coup by Afghan Army leaders Mohammed Rafie and Sayed Mohammad Gulabzoy. As a result, the KGB mistakenly informed its operatives in Kabul that SAVAK tricked the PDPA into starting a rebellion, expecting it to be crushed and for the rebels to fail.

According to Polish author Ryszard Kapuściński, SAVAK was responsible for: Censorship of press, books, and films; Interrogation and often torture of prisoners; and Surveillance of political opponents.

== Victims ==
Writing at the time of the Shah's overthrow, Time magazine on February 19, 1979, described SAVAK as having "long been Iran's most hated and feared institution" which had "tortured and murdered thousands of the Shah's opponents". The Federation of American Scientists also found it guilty of "the torture and execution of thousands of political prisoners" and symbolising "the Shah's rule from 1963–79." The FAS list of SAVAK torture methods included "electric shock, whipping, beating, inserting broken glass and pouring boiling water into the rectum, tying weights to the testicles, and the extraction of teeth and nails".

== Fardoust and security and intelligence after the revolution ==
SAVAK was closed down shortly before the overthrow of the monarchy and the coming to power of Ayatollah Ruhollah Khomeini in the February 1979 Iranian Revolution. Following the departure of the Shah in January 1979, SAVAK's more than 3,000 strong central staff and its agents were targeted for reprisals. However, it is believed that Khomeini may have changed his mind and may have retained them into the new SAVAMA. Hossein Fardoust, a former classmate of the Shah, was a deputy director of SAVAK until he was appointed head of the Imperial Inspectorate, also known as the Special Intelligence Bureau, to watch over high-level government officials, including SAVAK directors. Fardoust later switched sides during the revolution and managed to salvage the bulk of the SAVAK organization. According to author Charles Kurzman, SAVAK was never dismantled but rather changed its name and leadership and continued on with the same codes of operation, and a relatively unchanged "staff."

SAVAK was replaced by the "much larger" SAVAMA, Sazman-e Ettela'at va Amniat-e Melli-e Iran, also known as the Ministry of Intelligence and National Security of Iran. After the Iranian Revolution, a museum was opened in the former Towhid Prison in central Tehran called "Ebrat". The museum displays and exhibits the documented atrocities of SAVAK.

== See also ==
- Anti-Sabotage Joint Committee
- Second Bureau of Imperial Iranian Army
- Prime Ministry Intelligence Office
- Ministry of Intelligence (Iran)
- Basij
