= Jafar Sharif-Emami =

Iranian politician (1912–1998)

- جعفر شریف‌امامی
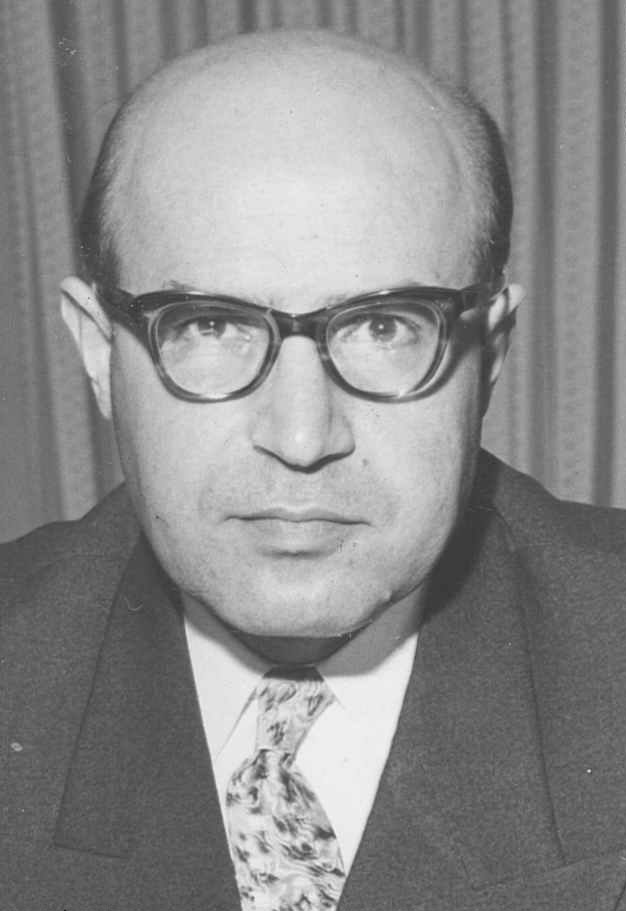
- Sharif-Emami c. 1960

33rd Prime Minister of Iran
- In office 27 August 1978 – 6 November 1978
- Monarch: Mohammad Reza Pahlavi
- Preceded by: Jamshid Amouzegar
- Succeeded by: Gholam Reza Azhari
- In office 31 August 1960 – 5 May 1961
- Monarch: Mohammad Reza Pahlavi
- Preceded by: Manouchehr Eghbal
- Succeeded by: Ali Amini

President of the Senate
- In office 11 September 1964 – 24 March 1978
- Monarch: Mohammad Reza Pahlavi
- Preceded by: Mohsen Sadr
- Succeeded by: Mohammad Sajadi

Minister of Foreign Affairs
- In office 30 July 1960 – 1 December 1960
- Prime Minister: Manouchehr Eghbal
- Preceded by: Abbas Aram
- Succeeded by: Ghods-Nakhai

Personal details
- Born: 17 June 1912 Tehran, Sublime State of Iran
- Died: 16 June 1998 (aged 85) New York City, New York, U.S.
- Party: Rastakhiz Party (1975–1978)
- Spouse: Eshrat Moazami (died 1997)
- Children: 3
- Education: Tehran University

Jafar Sharif-Emami (Persian: جعفر شریف‌امامی; 17 June 1912 – 16 June 1998) was an Iranian politician who was the prime minister of Iran from 1960 to 1961 and again in 1978. He was a cabinet minister, president of the Senate of Iran, president of the Pahlavi Foundation and the president of the Iran Chamber of Commerce, Industries, Mines & Agriculture during the reign of Shah Mohammad Reza Pahlavi.

== Early life and education ==
Sharif-Emami was born in Tehran on 17 June 1912 to a clerical family. His father was a mullah. After high school, Sharif-Emami was sent (along with thirty other young men) to Germany where he studied for eighteen months, returning to Iran in 1930 to work with state railroad organization until the Anglo-Soviet invasion of Iran. Years later he was sent to Sweden for technical training, returning in 1939 when he received a degree in engineering.

== Career and activities ==
Sharif-Emami began his career at the Iranian state railways in 1931. Arrested in summer of 1943 for alleged ties to Nazi Germany he was kept in detention along with many other members of Iran's elite. After his release he was appointed director-general of the Irrigation Agency. In 1950, he was appointed undersecretary of roads and communications. Prime Minister and General Haj Ali Razmara appointed him acting minister and then minister of roads to his cabinet inaugurated in June 1950, his first cabinet post.

He served as the minister of industries and mines in Manuchehr Eghbal's cabinet. He was prime minister from 1960 to 1961, and again in 1978, a few months before the overthrow of the Shah. He was appointed prime minister by Shah on 27 August 1978 because of his ties to clergy. Sharif-Emami succeeded Jamshid Amouzegar in the post. Sharif-Emami resigned from the office on 5 November 1978 and was replaced by Gholam Reza Azhari in the post.

Mohammad-Reza Shah welcomes Sharif Emami and his government in Niavaran Palace

During his short tenure, he undid many of the Shah's plans including the closing of casinos, abandoning the Imperial calendar, abolishing the Rastakhiz Party and allowing all political parties to be active and personally responsible for preventing SAVAK to get involved and preventing the KGB backed clergyman from creating and continuing the 1979 revolution. All of his efforts to reform the political system in Iran, was overshadowed by the Black Friday massacre in Jaleh Square on 8 September 1978, mass protests, martial law and nationwide strikes, which brought the country's economy to its knees. He resigned from office amid riots on 5 November 1978.

Sharif-Emami was also long-time president of the Iranian Senate and chairman of the Pahlavi Foundation. He was one of the close confidants of the Shah.

== Personal life and death ==
Sharif-Emami was married and had three children, two daughters and a son.

For some years Sharif-Emami was the Grand Master of the Freemason Grand Lodge of Iran, which gave him some informal influence among Iran's political elite.

Sharif-Emami left Iran during the Iranian Revolution in 1979, immigrating to the Upper East Side of Manhattan, New York City. He died at a hospital on 16 June 1998, one day shy of his 86th birthday, in New York City. He was buried in Valhalla, New York.

== See also ==
- List of Iranian senators

Political offices
Preceded by Abbas Aram	Minister of Foreign Affairs; 1960	Succeeded by Hossein Ghods-Nakhai
Preceded by Manouchehr Eghbal	Prime Minister of Iran; 1960–1961	Succeeded by Ali Amini
Preceded by Mohsen Sadr	President of the Senate; 1964–1978	Succeeded by Mohammad Sajadi
Preceded by Jamshid Amouzegar	Prime Minister of Iran; 1978	Succeeded by Gholam Reza Azhari
