= Hassan Zia-Zarifi =

Iranian intellectual and communist (1939–1975)

Hassan Zia-Zarifi (Persian: حسن ضیاظریفی; 1939 – 1975) was an Iranian intellectual and one of the ideological founders of the communist guerrilla movement in Iran.

On April 18, 1975, he was executed extrajudicially along with eight others while in prison in Tehran. The execution generated tremendous internal and foreign criticism against the increasingly oppressive government of Shah Mohammed Reza Pahlavi and helped cement its reputation as a serious violator of human rights.

By the time of his execution, the small group Zia-Zarifi had helped form along with Bijan Jazani had developed into the Organization of Iranian People's Fedai Guerrillas, who posed a serious challenge to the Shah's government.

== Personal life ==
Hassan Zia-Zarifi was born in Lahijan, in the northern province of Gilan, on April 10, 1939, the second youngest of eight children of Hajji Issa Zia-Zarifi, a merchant, and Rokhsareh Monajjemi. His father was a religious man but Hassan was mostly influenced by his older brothers, who were active in leftist causes.

He entered the law faculty of the University of Tehran in 1960. He graduated in 1963 and was immediately conscripted and served two years of mandatory military service. Although as a university graduate he should have served as an officer, he served as a private due to his record of political activity. After the end of his service, he went to work in the Behshahr cooking oil company. In 1967, he took a position as an intern in a legal office.

He had little time for a personal life. He was apparently in love with a young woman at the time, but his political activity did not permit him to pursue his social life. He was arrested in 1967 and convicted by a military tribunal to ten years in prison. In 1973, he was retried in the wake of the assault on the Siahkal gendarmerie station and given the death penalty. The sentence was commuted to life in prison, but he was killed in prison by members of SAVAK, the Shah's feared intelligence service, in 1975.

== Political activity ==
Hassan Zia-Zarifi began his political activism as a young boy, inspired by the more permissive political environment in the late 1940s and early 1950s and the movement to nationalize Iran's oil industry. He organized demonstrations and boycotts in high school, protesting the poor school conditions and harsh treatment of students by teachers. He joined the youth wing of the Tudeh Party in 1953, shortly before the CIA-engineered coup d'état of August 18, 1953, which overthrew the democratically elected government of Mohammed Mossadeq.

He continued his political activity even during the repressive period immediately after the coup. He was arrested for the first time in 1956, and because he was seventeen, sent to juvenile detention. On the day of his release, the martial law commander slapped him across the ear "to save him from future transgressions." The blow permanently damaged his hearing.

His entry into the law faculty in the early 1960s coincided with a period of relative political openness. He joined the reconstituted liberal National Front and soon gained prominence as a student activist and he was elected to the central committee of the law students' association (where he joined Abolhassan Banisadr, who would be the first elected president of the Islamic Republic). He was arrested on numerous occasions as the universities became the central battleground against the monarchy.

By 1962, he was a leader of the widespread student political movement. He was elected to represent university students in the National Front of Iran's central congress in 1962, but National Front member Shapur Bakhtiar (who later gained notoriety as the last prime minister of the Pahlavi regime) opposed his membership on the grounds that Zia-Zarifi's criticism of the Shah's government was too radical.

On 15 Khordad 1342 (5 June 1963), nationwide protests broke out against the Shah's efforts to exile Ayatollah Ruhollah Khomeini, by then a highly vocal critic of the imperial government. The movement was based in the seminaries of Qom and the more religious rural areas, but the leftist students immediately took to the streets in support of the anti-Shah protesters, which resulted in massive demonstrations and riots. Hassan was hospitalized after he received a severe head injury when he was beaten by baton-wielding police. The following day, he was arrested from his hospital bed and detained for three months without charge.

This incident was the first major popular uprising against the Shah after the 1953 coup and, predictably, elicited a tremendous backlash by the security forces. The Shah ended any pretence of pluralism, and the resistance to his rule changed from advocacy of reform led by the liberal National Front to clamor for revolution led by more militant forces inspired by communist and Islamic ideology.

== The Ideology of Armed Resistance ==
The brutal crackdown after the 15 Khordad uprising convinced many young critics of the Shah's government that there was no hope for peaceful reform of the system. Rather, Iranian activists saw the only way forward as revolutionary overthrown of the entire monarchical system, inspired by the recent successes of armed movements in Viet Nam, Cuba, Algeria, and Palestine.

When Hassan Zia-Zarifi completed his military conscription in 1965, he met Bijan Jazani, a noted young leftist activist with a long history in the youth wing of the Tudeh Party. According to Jazani, during meetings in Zia-Zarifi's house, a small nucleus of like-minded young university graduates came together to discuss how to implement the ideology of armed resistance in Iran. Their analysis was that the monarchy was a fundamentally reactionary form of government but that it could be toppled by a revolution sparked by an armed vanguard. They believed that small armed attacks would shock the system and create space for necessary political action and arouse the masses. They achieved considerable success in critiquing the failures of Iran's opposition movement, particularly the Tudeh party. Jazani and Zarifi co-authored a theoretical manifesto that forcefully expounded this strategy and formed the ideological bedrock of the movement.

During 1965 and 1966, the small group, which came to be known as the Jazani-Zarifi group, moved beyond the purely theoretical stage and began recruiting members and organizing them in a cell structure, with a larger network dedicated to political action, while a smaller, more committed sub-group, whose identities were not known by the larger membership, prepared for armed insurrection.

By 1966, the Jazani-Zarifi group had begun implementing its theories. The group procured a few small weapons and was planning to attack government banks to "confiscate" funds for their plans.

Notwithstanding their theoretical and analytical abilities, Zarifi and Jazani were ill-prepared for the rigors of actual guerrilla activity. Their organization was almost immediately penetrated by the Shah's draconian secret service, the SAVAK. In early 1968, Jazani was arrested; Zarifi went into hiding and evaded capture for another month until he was betrayed by Abbas Shahriari, a SAVAK double agent who was a high level Tudeh party official. Hassan Zia-Zarifi was arrested on February 14, 1968.

== Detention, Torture, and Resistance ==
Immediately after his capture, Zia-Zarifi was subjected to intense torture as SAVAK tried to gather information about the group's activities. According to government documents released after the revolution, the torture was so severe that Zia-Zarifi was hospitalized after two days. Over the course of his first year in detention, Hassan was hospitalized a total of 12 days as a result of torture. He was strapped to a metal chair heated to extreme temperatures. He was also subjected to wearing heavily weighted chains around his wrists and ankles.

Only after a year in detention did Zia-Zarifi finally get a hearing in a court, albeit a patently unfair one. He, along with 13 other members of the group (including Jazani) faced a military tribunal that was blatantly unjust and observed no due process whatsoever. The prosecutor asked the court to apply the death penalty to Zia-Zarifi and Jazani.

The trial elicited tremendous condemnation inside and outside Iran. Observers from various human rights groups, including Amnesty International, as well as the British Parliament, were horrified by the prisoners' accounts of torture and shocked by the utter disregard for legal process. Under international pressure, the tribunal lowered its verdict to the maximum allowable by law: Zia-Zarifi was sentenced to 10 years in prison (the initial verdict was ten years solitary confinement but Zia-Zarifi was later removed from solitary).

Zia-Zarifi continued his resistance against the government while in prison. He acted as a lawyer for convicts, many of whom were completely ignorant of their rights. He also continuously provided educational sessions for fellow prisoners about the failures of the Shah's government. Zia-Zarifi viewed prison as an opportunity to gain greater familiarity with Iranian society and to establish, by example and through political argument, a model of resistance to the Shah's government. Zia-Zarifi was eventually moved to Rasht prison, where he was close to his family in Lahijan.

== The Siahkal Attack and Its Aftermath ==
Some of Jazani and Zia-Zarifi's colleagues evaded capture and succeeded in putting their theories into practice. They expanded the organization and actively pursued training in military tactics and strategy. Thus they formed the Organization of Iranian People's Fedai Guerrillas. The OIPFG began conducting surveys of Iran's mountainous and verdant northern provinces because it believed the area provided ideal ground for initiating a successful guerrilla uprising.

On 19 Bahman 1349 (8 February 1971) nine members of the group launched their first attack on the gendarmerie post of the small village of Siahkal, situated close to Lahijan, Zia-Zarifi's hometown. The attack proved disastrous: the group's contact in the village, a school teacher, had already been captured by SAVAK, and the local farmers immediately turned against the guerillas. The government mobilized a tremendous military response, much larger than anticipated by the guerillas. Thousands of troops and several helicopters scoured the country-side for days until ultimately all were killed or captured. Although the Siahkal assault was unquestionably a military defeat, it proved a political and propaganda turning point in the struggle against the Shah, as it pointed out the development of a hitherto unseen level of resistance against the imperial regime. The government's overwhelming response only served to highlight the Shah's fear of armed resistance and imbued the fighters with a popular mystique. Siahkal eventually became known as the foundation of the anti-Shah guerrilla movement and as a major step in the struggle that led to the overthrow of the Shah.

The government strongly suspected that Zia-Zarifi had played an important role in planning the attack on Siahkal. An OIPFG member, Ghaffour Hassanpour, had been captured by SAVAK before the Siahkal incident. Under intense torture, Hassanpour confessed that he had met with Zia-Zarifi at Rasht prison and discussed with him the conditions of the group and the possibility of Zia-Zarifi escaping from prison. Based on this information, the government transferred Zia-Zarifi by helicopter from Rasht prison to Tehran, and for two months he was held strictly incommunicado. According to SAVAK documents, Zia-Zarifi was again subjected to horrific torture and interrogation, in part to gather more information about the guerillas' structure and plans, and in part as punishment for his perceived role in organizing the assault on Siahkal.

== The Death Penalty, International Pressure, and Extrajudicial Execution ==
Although he was in prison, Hassan Zia-Zarifi was put on a new trial, along with the survivors of the Siahkal attack and other members of the OIPFG. In Khordad 1350 (May 1971) Zia-Zarifi faced another military tribunal and this time the prosecution successfully called for the death penalty, a verdict upheld on appeal.

The verdict aroused immediate international furor, especially because Zia-Zarifi was already imprisoned at the time of the Siahkal incident and the case against him rested almost entirely on supposed confessions extracted under torture. Zia-Zarifi himself took advantage of the forum presented by the trial to denounce the severe torture he had endured, including being whipped, electrocuted, subjected to extended hunger, and deprived of necessary medical attention.

Bowing to international public pressure, the Shah commuted Zia-Zarifi's sentence to life in prison with hard labor. But this did not decrease the harshness of Zia-Zarifi's treatment. Facing a rapidly growing militancy, the Shah gave SAVAK free rein to extract a public apology and confession from the prisoners, particularly Zia-Zarifi and Jazani, viewed as the movement's ideological founders.

Hassan was held in Kerman prison, along with ordinary criminal convicts, some of whom were goaded by prison guards to continually harass Zia-Zarifi. Nevertheless, Zia-Zarifi continued his legal efforts on behalf of other prisoners. He was subject to unceasing torture and interrogation during this period.

By 1974, the OIPFG under the leadership of Hamid Ashraf had solidified its organization and embarked on a campaign of assassinating senior government officials who had been directly implicated in the detention and torture of government critics. After the OIPFG assassinated General Zia Farsiu, the Chief Military Prosecutor, SAVAK again brought Zia-Zarifi to the notorious Komite prison in Tehran, where he suffered through severe torture again purely as a punitive measure. SAVAK was frustrated that Zia-Zarifi would not agree to cooperate with the government and seemed able to continue his political work even from inside a prison cell. In early 1975, SAVAK again removed Zia-Zarifi, this time to Evin prison where he was under the immediate scrutiny of SAVAK's interrogators.

On April 18, 1975, the government announced that Zia-Zarifi and 8 other prisoners including Jazani had been killed while trying to escape from prison, along with eight others (including Jazani). Zia-Zarifi was 36 years old at the time. The story of the prisoners' escape met with immediate skepticism, as the prisoners were in no physical shape for such an attempt.

After the 1979 revolution, a notorious SAVAK agent, Bahman Naderipour, known by his alias of Tehrani, provided an admission during his trial about the circumstances of the death of Zia-Zarifi and others. According to Naderipour, the prisoners' execution was conceived as revenge for the assassination of military officials. On April 18, SAVAK agents gathered the prisoners from Evin prison and put them on a bus, blindfolded and handcuffed. They were taken to the hills bordering Evin prison. The prisoners were forced off the bus and ordered to sit on the ground. One agent declared that the prisoners would be killed in retaliation for the death of government agents. Jazani and some of the other prisoners protested loudly. The prisoners were shot at close range by Uzi submachine guns, followed by a pistol shot to the head.

There are strong reasons to believe that Naderipour may have been subjected to severe torture after being detained by the revolutionary government, therefore the details of his narrative which was obtained under duress is questionable by all standards. The circumstance of Hassan Zia-Zarifi's death will remain a mystery. The only truth that remains is that he was killed / executed because he was deemed as a terrorist. Zia-Zarifi was found guilty in a court of law for planning the assassination of Iranian officials, U.S. advisor's on assignment in Iran and simple peasants at Siahkal.

International human rights groups and the Confederation of Iranian Students studying abroad vehemently criticized the Shah's government. The execution cemented the regime's international reputation as an abusive, illegitimate government. Less than two years later, with the presidency of Jimmy Carter, the U.S. also began pressuring the government to improve its human rights record. By then, the public movement that culminated in the revolution of 1979 had begun and the Shah's end was in sight.

== Sources ==
- Maziar Behrooz (1999). Rebels with a Cause: The Failure of the Left in Iran. I.B. Tauris. ISBN 964-311-263-2..
- Dr. Abolhassan Zia-Zarifi (2004). The Biography of Hassan Zia-Zarifi: From Tehran University to the Evin Killing Fields ("Zendeginameh Hassan Zia-Zarifi"). Amindezh Publishing. ISBN 964-93-780-1-4..
