= Azmoudeh =

Azmoudeh (Persian: آزموده) is an Iranian surname. Notable people with the surname include:

- Amir Hossein Azmoudeh (1908–1998), Iranian military officer
- Avaz Azmoudeh (fl. 1992–2004), Iranian Paralympic athlete
- Eskandar Azmoudeh (1912–1998), Iranian military officer
