= Zarghami (surname) =

Zarghami (Persian: ضرغامی) is a Persian surname. Notable people with the surname include:

- Azizollah Zarghami (1884–1978), Iranian military officer
- Cyma Zarghami (born 1962), Iranian-American cable television executive
- Ezzatollah Zarghami (born 1970), Iranian politician and military officer
- Ezzatollah Zarghami (field marshal), Iranian military officer
