= Jafar Shafaghat =

Iranian general (1915–2001)

Timsar Jafar Shafaghat
- جعفر شفقت
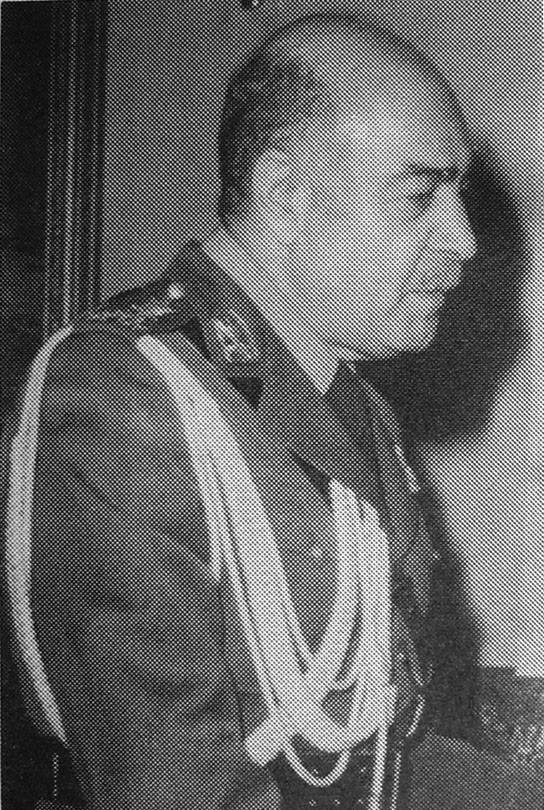
- General Shafaghat, c. 1970s

Minister of War
- In office 5 January 1979 – 11 February 1979
- Monarch: Mohammad Reza Pahlavi
- Prime Minister: Shapour Bakhtiar
- Preceded by: Reza Azimi
- Succeeded by: Ahmad Madani (as Minister of National Defence)

Governor of East Azerbaijan province
- In office 6 March 1978 – 30 December 1978
- Monarch: Mohammad Reza Pahlavi
- Prime Minister: Jamshid Amouzegar; Jafar Sharif-Emami; Gholam Reza Azhari
- Preceded by: Eskandar Azmoudeh
- Succeeded by: Rahmatollah Moghaddam Maraghei

Deputy Chief of the Joint Staff
- In office 1974 – 6 March 1978
- Monarch: Mohammad Reza Pahlavi
- Prime Minister: Amir-Abbas Hoveyda; Jamshid Amouzegar
- Preceded by: ?
- Succeeded by: Houshang Hatem

Aide-de-camp General to the of Chief of the Joint Staff and Head of the Imperial Military Household
- In office 1970–1974
- Monarch: Mohammad Reza Pahlavi
- Prime Minister: Amir-Abbas Hoveyda
- Preceded by: Reza Azimi
- Succeeded by: Mohsen Hasheminejad

Personal details
- Born: 1915 Nakhchivan, Russian Empire
- Died: 4 February 2001 (aged 85–86) Nice, France
- Education: Officers' School; École de l'infanterie École supérieure de guerre

Military service
- Allegiance: Pahlavi Iran
- Branch/service: Imperial Iranian Ground Forces
- Years of service: 1933–1979
- Rank: General
- Commands: Chief of Staff of the Ground Forces; Second Army (?–1966); 4th Rezaiyeh Division; 2nd Tabriz Division; Immortal Guards (1946–1950); Iranian Imperial Guard (1942–1946); Protection Company of the Pahlavi Family
- Battles/wars: Siahkal incident; Seizure of Abu Musa and the Greater and Lesser Tunbs; Dhofar rebellion; Second Iraqi–Kurdish War; 1974–1975 Shatt al-Arab conflict; Iranian Revolution

Jafar Shafaghat (Persian: جعفر شفقت; c.1915 – February 4, 2001) was an Iranian General during the Pahlavi-era and was the last Minister of War in Shapour Bakhtiar's government (1978–1979). Shafaghat was the last Pahlavi era governor of East Azerbaijan province. He died in exile in Nice, France.

== Early life ==
Jafar Shafaghat was born in Nakhchivan in 1915, to an aristocratic Azerbaijani family. His father was an officer in the Imperial Russian Cavalry and later served as Colonel in the Army of the Azerbaijan Democratic Republic. When he was a child, the family fled to Persia (Iran) as refugees in 1921 after the Bolshevik takeover of Azerbaijan After graduating from primary and secondary school, with the help of his uncle Mohammad-Hossein Damavandi, he entered the Iranian College of Officers in 1933 (1312 Shamsi). After a two-year course, in the year 1935 (1314 Shamsi), he received the rank of officer.

He later served in the Imperial guard, and ultimately was appointed commander of the shah's guard with the rank of captain. He served as the commander of the Immortal Guard of the Imperial Guard until 1950 with the rank of Colonel.

He attended the École de l'infanterie, the Infantry School, for officers and under-officiers, located with l'ecole nationale des sous-officiers d'active (ENSOA), appelée communément Saint-Maixent in France and graduated 1953 (1332 Shamsi). He came back from France during the Mossadegh uprising and then went back a second time and graduated from École supérieure de guerre as part of the 70th group of graduates.

== Military career ==
One of his most important posts at that time was the command of the 4th Rezaiyeh Division and the command of the Tabriz division. He was also the chief of staff of the army and deputy chief of staff until he was appointed commander of the 2nd Army. Later he became the Adjutant General of the Shah, until he was elected Deputy Chief of Staff of the General Staff of the Armed Forces. Jafar Shafaghat took several courses of command in France and the United States, and also received a doctorate in international law from the Sorbonne, and was also a military judge.

General Shafaghat took an active part in the reconstruction of the Iranian Imperial Guard in 1942, the strength of which was 700 volunteers. In 1946, he became commander of the "Immortal Guard", the elite imperial guard of the Shah. General Shafaghat attended the coronation of Mohammad Reza Shah on 26 October 1967 and personally handed over the Pahlavi Crown to the Shah.

Among his relatives in the army were: Brigadier General Khalil Shafaghat (sibling), Brigadier General Sattar Salimian, Major General Mahsud Hamapayi (division commander and last governor of the province of Kohgiluyeh and Boyer-Ahmad in 1978), Brigadier General Aziz Damavandi from the commanders of the Imperial Air Force) and Air Force Colonel Buick Damavandi.

== Military Governor of East Azerbaijan (1978) ==
On 6 March 1978, General Jafar Shafaghat was appointed governor of East Azerbaijan province. This appointment followed the resignation of General Eskandar Azmoudeh, the former governor. Azmoudeh was fired on 20 February along with the head of the SAVAK branch in the province of East Azerbaijan and six policemen.

The Tabriz uprising of February 1978, which was directed against the Shah's government, was suppressed by police and army units, resulting in casualties among the demonstrators. A total of 14 people were killed and 125 injured. About 600-700 demonstrators were arrested, but soon released. These figures were confirmed in post-revolutionary investigations.

In turn, this uprising led to large-scale changes in the system, and these changes and the ensuing consequences soon led to the decline of the Pahlavi imperial system throughout Iran. The first major changes at the highest managerial levels occurred immediately after the formation of the “Tabriz Accident Investigation Board.” By order of the Shah, a top-level investigation team was sent to Tabriz, the head of which was appointed General Shafaghat. Due to the position of the members of this council and their high positions in the ruling bureaucratic apparatus, it seemed that there were significant changes in the levels of government in the province of East Azerbaijan. The Shah was so excited and worried about the events in Tabriz that he accused almost all officials of the province of East Azerbaijan who were involved in the events in Tabriz and promised to punish all those who could not prevent the bloodshed and take timely action. The first steps in this direction were the dismissal of 9 high-ranking officials of the province, among them: the governor, local police chiefs and some employees of SAVAK. On 7 March, the Shah's leadership announced that several SAVAK officials and police would be punished for allowing unrest in February to get out of control. Governor General Eskandar Azmoudeh was removed from office and called to Tehran. Colonel Yahya Likwani, head of the SAVAK branch in the province of East Azerbaijan, was dismissed and temporarily removed from his post: but he soon again took a responsible post in the special services - Likvani became the head of the SAVAK branch in Lorestan province. But the least fortunate was Major General Kahramani, the provincial police chief. Immediately after the end of the meetings of the Investigative Commission in Tabriz, he was found guilty of the unrest and transferred to Tehran by decision of the council, and after that he never held high military and disciplinary posts.

Commentator Paul Hofmann's impressions of the Iranian public's opinion of their national intelligence agency, SAVAK, show that the Iranians were surprised that the government publicly criticized to the SAVAK branch in Tabriz.

The Shah also ordered the organization of a pro-Shah counter-demonstration to show support for the dynasty among the Azerbaijani population. It took the state apparatus six weeks to prepare a huge pro-government rally on April 9. According to some reports, the number of participants in this rally reached 300,000, which was confirmed by US reports.

At this rally, prime minister Jamshid Amouzegar delivered a speech. The opposition claimed that the government forcibly drove people from various neighboring villages, and regime agents spread false rumors in advance that the Grand Ayatollah Mohammad Kazem Shariatmadari would personally be present at the pro-Shah rally.

== The victory of the Islamic Revolution in February 1979 ==
In early January 1979, the Shah appointed Shapour Bakhtiar to the post of prime minister, who began to search for a candidate for the post of Minister of War. Initially, the candidacy of General Fereydoun Djam was considered, but he refused. Then the choice fell on General Jafar Shafaghat, one of his closest assistants to the Shah and the former head of the Imperial Guard.

General Shafaghat was the only high-ranking officer of the Iranian Shah's army (out of 27 who were present at the Supreme Military Council of Iran) who refused to sign a document on the surrender of the army to the revolutionary forces in February 1979 and deleted his name from the list. This manifesto of the highest ranks of the army contributed to the easy victory of the Islamic Revolution.

After the fall of the monarchy and the establishment of an Islamic regime, it was falsely reported that General Shafaghat was detained, but after a while he was released. However General Shafaghat was in hiding and was never detained. Jafar Shafaghat fled to France in 1980.

Jafar Shafaghat died on 4 February 2001, in the southern French city of Nice, at the age of 85, where he was buried.

Military offices
Preceded by Fereydoun Djam	Commander of the Second Army ?–1966	Succeeded by ?
Preceded by Reza Azimi	Aide-de-camp General to the of Chief of the Joint Staff; 1970–1974	Succeeded by Mohsen Hasheminejad
Preceded by Reza Azimi	Head of the Imperial Military Household; 1970–1974	Succeeded by Mohsen Hasheminejad
Preceded by ?	Deputy Chief of the Joint Staff; 1974–1977	Succeeded by Houshang Hatem
Political offices
Preceded by Eskandar Azmoudeh	Governor of East Azerbaijan; 6 March 1978–30 December 1978	Succeeded by Rahmatollah Moghaddam Maraghei
Preceded by Reza Azimi	Minister of War; 5 January 1979–11 February 1979	Succeeded by Ahmad Madani as Minister of National Defense
