= Bijan Jazani =

Iranian political activist (born 1938)

- بیژن جزنی
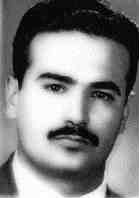
- A photograph of Bijan Jazani, possibly taken in the 1950's
- Born: January 9, 1938; Iran, Tehran
- Died: April 19, 1975 (aged 37)
- Known for: One of the founders of the Organization of Iranian People's Fedai Guerrillas
- Criminal charges: Indication under military court in February 1969
- Criminal penalty: 2–10 years of in Qasr Prison

Bijan Jazani (Persian: بیژن جَزنی, also spelled "Bizhan Jazani"; January 9, 1938, in Tehran – April 19, 1975) was an Iranian political activist and a significant figure among modern Iranian Socialist intellectuals. A Marxist theorist, Jazani was one of the founders of the Organization of Iranian People's Fedai Guerrillas.

== Personal and political life ==
Bijan Jazani was born to Hossien Jazani (حسین جزنی) and Alamtaj Kalantari Nazari (عالمتاج کلانتری نظری). He came from a politically active background; both of his parents' families were involved with the Tudeh Party during a period of political openness from Reza Shah's exile until the overthrow of Mohammed Mossadegh. The children of these families were drawn to and eventually joined the Tudeh youth movement. Over time, they took on increasingly significant roles within the party. Jazani's father, a military officer, became a member of the Tudeh Party in 1945, while his mother, Alamtaj Kalantari, was active in the Women's Tudeh Party.

In 1947, when Bijan Jazani was nine years old, his father joined the Southern Azerbaijani Democratic Party. In the same year, with the fall of Pishevari, his father left for the Soviet Union and remained there until 1967. For this reason, Alamtaj Kalantari took Bijan Jazani and his sisters to her parents' home.

This period had a significant impact on the future political life of Jazani. He lived in a household whose members had a professional role in the Tudeh party. During this time, his mother expanded her activities in the women's Tudeh party. Jazani, alongside his uncle, who was two years older than he was, joined the Tudeh Youth Organization in 1948 at the age of 10. After the Tudeh party became illegal on February 4, 1949, Jazani continued participation in the youth party. He was then chosen as the messenger of the youth organization because of his young age and family background. But the hidden activities of the Tudeh party and the affiliated organizations did not last long, and from 1951, the activities slowly became semi-transparent. In addition to this, the leaders of the Tudeh and the youth organization created the "Iranians in Favour of Peace", "National Organization in the Struggle against the Anglo-Iranian Oil Corporation", "Democratic Youth Organizations", and the "Student Organization of Tehran". Jazani began his activities in the "Student Organization of Tehran" in 1951–1952 and was initially responsible for a small group. In 1953 he became semi-responsible for this organization. He was also active in the circulation and sale of student newspapers. He began a gym in 1951, which helped students and developed into a place for recruiting members into the youth organization.

These activities continued—except in a short two-month period with the death of his sister Manijeh (منیژه)—until the coup d'état of August 19, 1953 (٢٨ مرداد سال ١٣٣٢). Jazani was arrested in December 1953 because of his political activities but gave the name Hossein Mahmoodi (حسین محمودی) to the court and, after three months in prison at a military court, was released under bond. He continued his political activities but was arrested in May 1954 at an organization gathering—disguised under a wedding ceremony—and again gave a false name and was released under bond. In the fall of the same year, he was summoned concerning the incident of December 1953 and served a 6-month prison term.

After release from prison, he focused on family while keeping true to his political views. He wasn't allowed back to high school, so he joined the art school of Kamal-ol-Molk. He created the Persepolis Advertising Company (کانون اگهی پرسپولیس) with the help of a friend. The company advertised in the form of paintings for local merchants. Jazani drew the paintings, leaving the business side to his friend. The success of the company led to the creation of the Nabl Film Institution (موسسه نبلی فیلم) in the late 1950s. The company developed TV advertising in Iran and gave financial stability to Jazani.

In 1959, with his company making enough money, he returned to his studies and received his diploma. The following year he signed up for the philosophy program at the University of Tehran. At this time, after eight years of close friendship with his childhood friend and member of the youth organization, Mihan Ghoreishy (میهن قریشی), he married her on October 13, 1960. The result of the marriage was two sons, Babak (بابک) and Mazyar—alias Maximilien (مازیار).

From the years 1956 until 1959, Jazani had no political activities. In this matter, his wife wrote: in these years, "We had no thoughts of a political future, we relied on our love and in the advancement of our studies. We spent most of our free time reading and at the theaters". In 1959, he returned to politics and created a magazine named Nedaye Khalgh (ندای خلق), intending to unite the political groups against the coup d'état regime. However, in the winter of 1959, the magazine's circulation was halted because of the tight political climate.

== Activity in political climate ==
When Jazani entered the University of Tehran, the country faced political and economic problems that led to a retreat for the Shah. These problems were caused by the inabilities of the Shah's economic policies and the extreme military expenses that began after the Coup d'état in 1953. In the spring of 1960, due to mounting debt and inflation, the government of Iran requested immediate financial assistance from the World Bank and the government of the United States. The World Bank demanded the Iranian government to fix budget problems, reduce salaries, and balance specific economic plans to receive 35 million dollars of assistance. The administration of John F. Kennedy also demanded political and economic reform in the Shah's government for 85 million dollar assistance. However, financial problems and external pressure to perform the reforms led to the regime's instability. The Shah, to deal with this problem, announced the elections of the 20th Majlis would be accessible to all organizations. Although this promise did not come to reality, it showed the retreat of the regime and the opening of a political climate in Iran. The leaders of the Iranian National Front (جبهه ملی ایران) officially announced the existence of the second national front movement and began their activities.

Jazani and his followers slowly moved from the Tudeh party to the student and national front organizations because of their interest in the guerrilla movement in Latin America. Jazani began participating in the student movement at the University of Tehran.

== Payam Daneshjoo ==
In early fall of 1963, Jebhe Melli Daneshjoo (سازمان دانشجویان جبهه ملی ایران), which after the resistance in Baharestan Ave, had lost hope to the politics of "patience and hope"; with the help of officials and leaders of the National Front (Iran) (جبهه ملی ایران) selected a new leader for this movement. This led to the creation of the third national movement in the year 1965 and the publication Payam Daneshjoo (نشریه پیام دانشجو) in the fall of 1963—published initially under Jebhe Melli Daneshjoo. Up to March 1964, Hassan Habiby was the editor responsible for collecting information, articles, and news, while Jazani was in charge of the publication process. In the spring of 1964, a committee was selected to run the publication made up of all factions of the student movement. Hooshang Keshavarz Sadr, Matin Daftari, Majeed Ahsan, and Mansoor Soroush were part of this committee. Jazani was in charge of publication, and Behzad Nabavi (بهزاد نبوی) was responsible for circulation. Jazani did the preliminary work related to the print at home. The printing was done on a handmade copy machine. Jazani had rented a hidden house for this purpose and had a significant role in all stages of the process, from financial to print.

By the spring of 1965, roughly 500 copies were published, and Bahmanpour Shareaty spread a number of them to officials of different universities in the Tehran province and others circulated by Matin Daftari and Dariush Forouhar in non-university-related locations. In this period, almost all of the process, from writing articles up to publication, was done by leftist student movements (Jazani's group, Tudeh (توده), loyalists of Maleki, and loyalists of Shoaeeyan). Jazani wrote several articles explaining the ideology of his movement in the publication. The activities of the third national movement had increasingly worried SAVAK (ساواک). On May 22, 1965, Savak arrested Mostafa Mallad and Bahmanpour Shareaty. In the afternoon of that same day, they arrested Jazani and several organizers of the student movement, such as Majeed Ahsan, Shireen Sour Esrafeel, and Manoochehr Taghavee. These arrests signalled the end of political freedom in Iran under Shah's regime, ending the third national movement in 1965. It seems that SAVAK was unaware of the role of Jazani in the publication of Payam Daneshjoo since the arrest was on charges related to participation in the circulation of the publication. The main reason for this mistake by SAVAK was Jazani's concealed presence in the publication. After his arrest, some of his friends, such as Iraj Vahedeepour, to show that Jazani had no role in the publication, continued the publication for a couple of issues after his arrest. Even so, Jazani and other student activists remained in prison until February 1966, when the court ruled a 9-month sentence but was immediately released given that he had already served his time in prison.

After prison, Jazani continued his studies and 1966 graduated with a doctorate in philosophy from the University of Tehran.

== Guerrilla movement ==
Jazani, after being released from prison with all his power, began developing and organizing his movement. In the spring of 1966, Hassan Zia-Zarifi was added to the group and, with his recommendation, united the organization with the Razm Avaran organization. Razm Avaran was organized by Abbass Sourky in 1959, and its members in the years before 1953 were members of the Tudeh party until February 15, 1960, when for promotion and circulation of the party in universities were arrested, supported the ideologies of the Tudeh party. But in 1964, when Sourky again organized Razm Avaran, not only did he not want to associate with the Tudeh party, but supported the ideology of the Chinese Communist Party. The recommendation of Hassan Zia-Zarifi, due to the characteristics of Sourky, such as inexperience, crowded work, and his past affiliations that led to him being arrested, caused the central authority of the group to be uninterested in this prospect. But, internal problems such as the impatience of members during the long development process, which showed when Keyoumars Ezadi left the group, led to the decision to negotiate between the two groups. Even though in the negotiations between Jazani, Zarifi, and Saeed Kalantari Nazari by Sourky and Zarar Zahedian, there was significant uncertainty to Sourky had been developed by Jazani; the prospect of adding 120 ready members and a large number of explosives and artillery finally led to the merger of the Razm Avaran group with the Jazani group in fall 1966.

There were significant problems with this merger. The 120 ready members did not take the organization seriously and were spread from the central group. Of the members of Razm Avaran, only Sourky and Zahedian met the regulations that would allow members to join the military wing and the central authority. The others became part of the reserve units of the group. One of these members was Naser Aghayan, who, from 1963, participated with the SAVAK and gave details of Razm Avaran's plan and members. After the merger between the two groups, Aghayan gave reports of the activities of Jazani's group to SAVAK.

== Ideology of Jazani's group ==
Jazani, with respect to the group's views, writes: "The experience of group members in Marxist-Leninist activities previous to joining the group led to it being known as followers of the Marxist-Leninist ideology without any discussion". But they were different from other organizations of their time, such as Tudeh, Jebheh Engelabi, etc., in this ideology. What was important for Jazani and his followers was to have an independent understanding of Marxism-Leninism without influence from China and the Soviet Union. Therefore, their key goal and what shaped their views was to do what benefited the people of Iran. For example, their position on the Soviet Union, which called itself the leader of the world communist movement, was based on this viewpoint. They began with the idea that a country's foreign policy is a result of the social values of its regime. This policy reflects the benefits of the leadership level (consisting of a class system) and reflects the ruling class's ideology. Therefore, a socialist government must be loyal to the goals of Marxist-Leninist and international pluralism. In this setting, they came up to the following conclusion regarding the relationship between the Soviet Union and Iran: "In our opinion the policies of the Soviet Union and other socialist countries in Iran opposes the growth and revolutionary struggle Asian countries against Imperialism and is in conflict with the chief idea of international pluralism and socialist diplomacy."

In this vision, Jazani explained the relationship between the group and the Soviet Union: "The group had many reasons not to be happy with the idea of the Soviet Union being the leader of the world's revolutionary movements. The Soviet Unions policies in Iran in the past twenty years and the few years of bad relations between the Soviet Union and the Tudeh party were known to the members of the group." It was because of this that Jazani concluded when seeing the relationship of the Soviet Union and Tudeh and Eastern Europe at the end of the decade of 1950 that: "... if the left movement wins the struggle in Iran, it must be aware of the Soviet Union's wanting of power. Failing to do so will lead to Iran becoming another satellite of the Soviets." Jazani said that if the power of the leftist movement falls in the hands of the Soviets before anything else, it will get rid of us. He believed that geographically Iran was too close to the Soviet Union to ignorantly come close to it without understanding the harms involved.

== Arrest and prison life ==
In early 1968, the organization's activities had reached a stalemate mainly due to a lack of funds. So the group decided to gain the required money from robbing banks. Their first attempt at this was on January 12, 1968, but three days before that date, Aghayan notified the SAVAK of the group's plans. This led to Jazani and Sourky's arrest and other organization members' hiding. The arrest of Shahrzad, whose location was notified to the Savak by Aghayan, led to the arrests of Izadi, Rashidi, Ahsan, Farokh Negahdar and others. In addition, five other members of the group (Zarifi, Jaleel Afshar, Choopan Zadeh, Saeed Kalantari Nazari, and Keyanzad) were arrested by the SAVAK with the assistance of Abbas-Ali Shahryari and his organization.

Even though the organization's key members had been arrested, the group was not destroyed. Safaii Farahani and Safari Ashtiani left Iran and joined the Palestinian organization Fatah. After returning to Iran, Farahani and Safari, organized the Siahkal (سياهکل) uprising on February 8, 1971. Shortly after that, the remaining members of the group, including Hamid Ashraf and Masoud Ahmadzadeh, reorganized and renamed it to Iranian People's Fadaee Guerrillas (چريك فداييان خلق ايران).

In February 1969, Jazani's group was indicted in military court. Jazani was sentenced to life for participating in an organization against the monarchy and carrying an illegal weapon, which was later reduced to 15 years. The sentences for other members varied, ranging from 2 to 10 years. The group's members were at Gasr prison until spring 1969, when Saeed Kalantari Nazari, Sourky, Sarmady, and Choopan Zadeh attempted to escape from prison. This led to the relocation of most group members to rural areas. Jazani was sent to Qom with ordinary prisoners. Because of the respect of the correctional officers towards Jazani, he was allowed to spend most of his time in the prison library studying and painting.

In this period, Jazani, with the assistance of his wife, gets in contact with the unknown members of the group and guides them in an ideological sense. In the summer of 1970, he wrote "What a revolutionary must know" and signed it in the name of Safaii Farahani to help Safaii strengthen his position in the group. When Siahkal occurred, through interrogation of the participants by SAVAK, they found out about the relationship between Jazani and the group. In March 1971, SAVAK brought Jazani to Tehran. From then on, Jazani remained in Tehran and was located between other political prisoners. In Tehran, he increases his activities in prison. Jazani believed that prison is a piece of the action outside and, therefore, must reflect the group's policies.

Jazani lived his life in prison based on this. With the help of his wife and other prisoners, he developed contact with the Iranian People's Fadaee Guerrillas outside of prison and created a leftist movement inside prison. The responsibility of this movement was to organize resistance, manage activities, and teaching political and ideological to leftist prisoners and recruit Iranian People's Fadaee Guerrillas. The action of Jazani caused problems from two sides in prison. The officials of SAVAK, who thought of Jazani as a significant problem in prison, attempted to stop him from his activities. On the other side, leftist prisoners who disagreed with Jazani acted in various ways against Jazani's activities. SAVAK also created problems between these leftist factions.

Most of those against Jazani were the followers of Masoud Ahmadzadeh and Amir Parviz Pooyan, two of the founders of Iranian People's Fadaee Guerrillas. Although these two individuals were killed in 1972, their teachings were the official teachings of the movement up to 1976. Jazani thought these two individuals' teachings were distractive, and his book "Armed struggle in Iran: The Road to Mobilization of the Masses" was written in response to a book written by Ahmadzadeh "Armed struggle, Both Tactic and Strategy". Even though Jazani did not mention Parviz Pooyan or Ahmadzadeh in his book, when discussing and offering his thoughts, he disapproves of those provided by these two individuals. Even though there were significant differences between the teachings of Jazani and Ahmadzadeh, two focal items were discussed between these two schools of thought. These were the revolutionary situation of the country and the method of struggle. The ones that disagreed with Jazani and approved of Ahmadzadeh were under the belief that the government was in a revolutionary status and situations for a revolution existed. Therefore, a guerrilla fighter must fight with artillery to make the people aware of the extreme status of the country. A smaller motor, the military uprising will turn a larger engine, the population, and the larger population will support the military uprising and bring down the Shah's government. In Ahmadzadeh's opinion, not believing the revolutionary situation shows a sense of individualism, which in the opinion of the leftist movement, is that of a traitor.

Jazani would explain that a revolutionary status does not exist in the country, and in addition to that, a revolution does not result from armed struggle. Instead, it comes about as a political, social, economic, and ideological development. A military uprising should be staged at the time of- and not before the revolution, as it does not cause a process by itself. In his opinion, those who are for a military uprising are similar to the Shah, who is blocking a peaceful means of struggle. Because of this, without talking about Ahmadzadeh, Jazani wrote, "When we hear that revolution begins with a military uprising, we have to say that the believers of this train of thought do not know two things: one the current situation of military uprising and second revolution in general and the revolution we want is a specific one."

The second major problem was the method of struggle. Ahmadzadeh believed that the only means of battle was a military one and had a strategic role in their fight. On the other hand, Jazani felt in the current situation, one should not limit their means to one method, but we should prepare the people in a political sense from all sides. Even though Jazani attempted to resolve issues through dialogue and unite the various leftist factions, his opponents dismantled the leftist movement in prison to decrease Jazani's influence. Even so, Jazani remained active to the end of his life when he was murdered alongside eight other prisoners on April 19, 1975, by Savak. Bahman Naderipour, a SAVAK agent and closely involved with the executions, described that day's events:

We took the prisoners to the high hills above Evin. They were blindfolded, and their hands were tied. We got them off the minibus and had them sit on the ground. Then, Attarpour told them that, just as your friends have killed our comrades, we have decided to execute you—the brain behind those executions. Jazani and the others began protesting. I do not know whether Attarpour or Colonel Vaziri first pulled out a machine gun and started shooting them. I do not remember whether I was the 4th or 5th person to whom they gave the machine gun. I had never done that before. In the end, Sa'di Jalil Esfahani [another SAVAK agent, Babak] shot them in their heads [to ensure they were dead].[1]

There are suggestions that Naderipour might have been tortured after being detained by the revolutionary government. Therefore, the details of his narrative, obtained under duress, are questionable by all standards. The circumstance of Bijan Jazani's death will remain a mystery. The only truth that remains is that he was killed by execution shortly before finishing his sentence. All of Jazani's books were written in prison from 1970 to 1974. They discussed establishing the independent leftist movement in the two decades of the 1960s and '70s. Jazani is buried in the 33rd block of Behesht-e Zahra cemetery.

== Books ==
1. Bijan Jazani (1980). Capitalism and revolution in Iran: Selected writings of Bizhan Jazani. L. Hill. ISBN 0-905762-82-7.
2. Bijan Jazani (1976). Armed struggle in Iran: The road to mobilization of the masses. Iran Committee. LCCN 80108223.

For more information visit: https://web.archive.org/web/20060614151405/http://fadaian-minority.org/english/home.html More information: https://web.archive.org/web/20060614151405/http://fadaian-minority.org/english/home.html

== Bijan Jazani's paintings ==
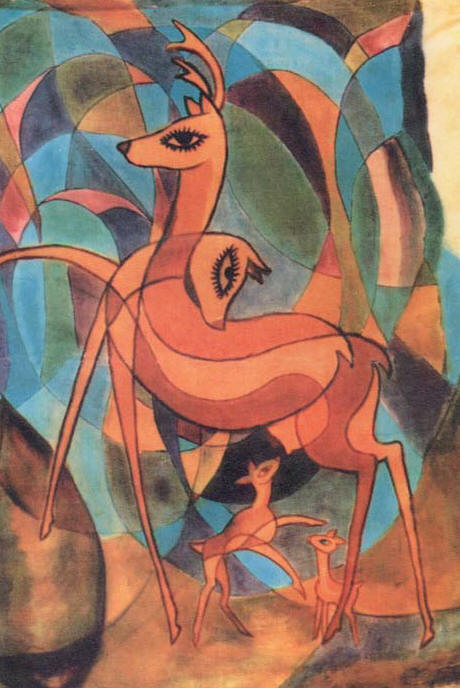
Life

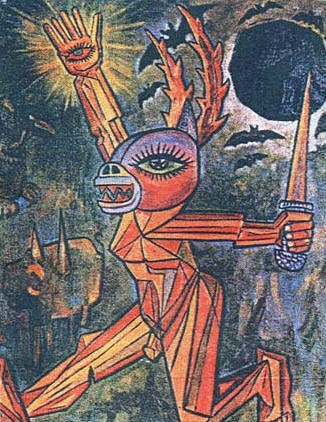
Siahkal painting

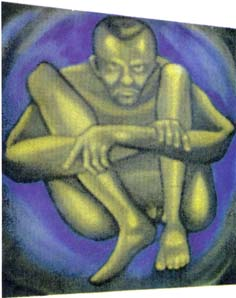
The prisoner

== See also ==
- Mostafa Sho'aiyan
