= Reza Azimi =

Iranian army officer (1909–1999)

Timsar Reza Azimi
- رضا عظیمی
- Azimi in 1953

Minister of War
- In office 2 January 1971 – 5 January 1979
- Monarch: Mohammad Reza Pahlavi
- Prime Minister: Amir-Abbas Hoveyda; Jamshid Amouzegar; Jafar Sharif-Emami; Gholam Reza Azhari
- Preceded by: Asadollah Sanii
- Succeeded by: Jafar Shafaghat

Head of the Imperial Military Household
- In office 1969 – 2 January 1971
- Monarch: Mohammad Reza Pahlavi
- Prime Minister: Amir-Abbas Hoveyda
- Preceded by: Office Established
- Succeeded by: Jafar Shafaghat

Aide-de-camp General to the of Chief of the Joint Staff
- In office 1965 – 2 January 1971
- Monarch: Mohammad Reza Pahlavi
- Prime Minister: Amir-Abbas Hoveyda
- Preceded by: ?
- Succeeded by: Jafar Shafaghat

Commander of the Ground Forces
- In office 15 March 1961 – 1965
- Monarch: Mohammad Reza Pahlavi
- Prime Minister: Jafar Sharif-Emami; Ali Amini; Asadollah Alam; Hassan Ali Mansur; Amir-Abbas Hoveyda
- Preceded by: Abdol Hossein Hejazi
- Succeeded by: Ezzatollah Zarghami

First Deputy of the Commander of the Ground Forces
- In office 1959 – 15 March 1961
- Monarch: Mohammad Reza Pahlavi
- Prime Minister: Manouchehr Eghbal
- Preceded by: ?
- Succeeded by: ?

Inspector General of the Joint Staff
- In office 1959–1959
- Monarch: Mohammad Reza Pahlavi
- Prime Minister: Manouchehr Eghbal
- Preceded by: ?
- Succeeded by: ?

Military Governor of Tehran
- In office 1952–1952
- Monarch: Mohammad Reza Pahlavi
- Prime Minister: Mohammad Mosaddegh; Ahmad Qavam; Mohammad Mosaddegh
- Preceded by: Mahmoud Afshartous
- Succeeded by: Ahmad Zangeneh

Personal details
- Born: 1 August 1909 Tehran, Qajar Iran
- Died: 8 September 1999 (aged 90) Paris, France

Military service
- Allegiance: Pahlavi Iran
- Branch/service: Ground Force
- Years of service: 1928–1979
- Rank: General
- Commands: Inspector General of the Joint Staff (1959); 1st Central Infantry Division (1953–1955); Western Army; Western Corps; Head of the Army Personnel Department; Tehran Military Police Garrison (1950–1951); Khoy Brigade; Chief of Staff of the 2nd Division
- Battles/wars: Iran crisis of 1946; 1962–1964 Tribal Rebellion of Fars; 1963 demonstrations in Iran; Siahkal incident; Seizure of Abu Musa and Tunbs; Dhofar rebellion; Second Iraqi–Kurdish War; 1974–1975 Shatt al-Arab conflict; Iranian Revolution

Reza Azimi (Persian: رضا عظیمی; 1 August 1909 – 8 September 1999,) was a senior military officer during the reign of the Shah Mohammad Reza Pahlavi. He was a general and held various military and government posts, including commander of the Imperial Iranian Ground Forces and minister of war.

== Biography ==
=== Early life ===
Reza Azimi was born in Tehran on 1 August 1909. He completed his primary education at Qajariyeh School and his secondary education at Firouz School before graduating from the Military School. He came from a military family; among his relatives were Brigadier General Farajollah Iravani, Lieutenant General Amir Ahmadi, Brigadier General Heydar Gholi Pesyan, and other military officers.

=== Education ===
After completing the two-year program at the Officers' Academy, Azimi graduated in 1930 with the rank of Second Lieutenant. He also completed the advanced course at the War College in 1940.

=== Military Career ===
Azimi began his career in the Army Ground Forces. In 1947, he was promoted to the rank of Colonel and appointed Chief of Staff of the 2nd Division. After being promoted to Brigadier General, he successively served as commander of the Khoy Brigade, commander of the Tehran Military Police Garrison, head of the Army Personnel Department, director of the Army Inspectorate, and commander of the Western Corps and the Western Army.

Following the 1953 Iranian coup d'état, Azimi temporarily commanded the disbanded Imperial Guard Division and was responsible for its reorganization.

Azimi served as the commander of the Imperial Iranian Ground Forces between 1960 and 1965. He left the office due to illness. Then he was made general adjutant to the Shah Mohammad Reza Pahlavi which he held until 1971.

Later Azimi served as the minister of war between 1971 and 1977 in the cabinet led by Prime Minister Amir-Abbas Hoveyda. He was appointed to the post on 13 September 1971. Azimi was among the nine members of the cabinet who were not Hoveyda's appointees or proteges. His deputy at the ministry was also a retired army officer, Hassan Toufanian. During his tenure Azimi dealt with legislative and budgetary issues, whereas his deputy, Toufanian, was responsible for the procurement of arms in accordance with the Shah's orders.

Azimi retained his post in the succeeding cabinet led by Prime Minister Jamshid Amouzegar between August 1977 and August 1978. Azimi continued to serve in the same post in the cabinet led by Prime Minister Jafar Sharif-Emami. He was also appointed Minister of War in the military government which was formed by Gholam Reza Azhari in November 1978 and lasted until the end of December.

He fled of to Paris, France after the Revolution.

== Death ==
General Azimi never married. He died in Paris on 8 September 1999 at the age of 91.

Military offices
Preceded by ?	Commander of the Central Provost; 1950–1951	Succeeded by ?
Preceded by Mahmoud Afshartous	Military Governor of Tehran; 1952	Succeeded by Ahmad Zangeneh
Vacant Dissolution of the division in October 1952 Title last held by Bahram Aryana	Commander of the 1st Central Infantry Division; 1953–1955	Succeeded by Mohammad Taghi Majidi
Preceded by ?	Inspector General of the Joint Staff; 1959	Succeeded by ?
Preceded by ?	First Deputy of the Commander of the Imperial Iranian Ground Force; 1959–15 March 1961	Succeeded by ?
Preceded by Abdol Hossein Hejazi	Commander of the Imperial Iranian Ground Force; 15 March 1961 – 1965	Succeeded by Ezzatollah Zarghami
Preceded by ?	Aide-de-camp General to the of Chief of the Joint Staff; 1965–2 January 1971	Succeeded by Jafar Shafaghat
New title	Head of the Imperial Military Household; 1969–2 January 1971	Succeeded by Jafar Shafaghat
Political offices
Preceded by Asadollah Sanii	Minister of War; 2 January 1971 – 5 January 1979	Succeeded by Jafar Shafaghat
