= Jafar Sultan revolt =

Kurdish uprising in Iran (1931)

- Part of the Kurdish separatism in Iran
Date	Autumn 1931
Location	Hawraman, North-Western Iran
Result	Revolt suppressed

Belligerents
Pahlavi Iran	Jafar Sultan's Kurdish rebels

Commanders and leaders
Reza Shah; Azizollah Zarghami; Ali Razmara	Jafar Sultan

The Jafar Sultan revolt (Kurdish: شۆڕشی جەعفەر سوڵتان, Persian: شورش جعفر سلطان) refers to a Kurdish tribal revolt in Pahlavi Iran which erupted in the mountainous Avroman region in 1931, and was one of the early tribal-nationalist Kurdish revolts against central Iranian rule during the early stage of Kurdish separatism in Iran.

== Background ==
Jafar Sultan of Avroman region took control of the area between Marivan and north of Halabja and remained independent until 1925. Jafar Sultan is seen as the ”head” of the royal sultan family (Lohoni, Lahoni) From 1927 to 1934 a number of Kurdish tribal uprisings erupted in the Avroman and Marivan regions. In 1926 Iranian forces fighting Kurdish insurgents in the Pizhdar, Avroman and Marivan areas executed all prisoners in an unprecedented act of brutality, likely among the factors that caused 31 Kurdish chieftains in the region to ask for British protection.

== See also ==
- Timeline of Kurdish uprisings
- List of modern conflicts in the Middle East
