= Eskandar Azmoudeh =

Iranian military officer (1912–1998)

- اسکندر آزموده
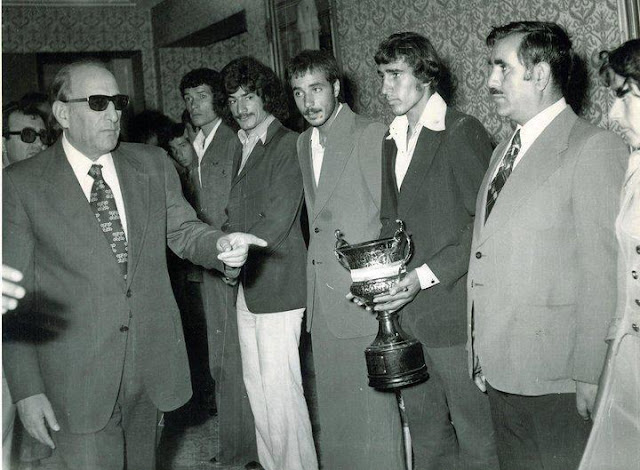
- General Azmoudeh (on the left)

Governors of East Azerbaijan Province
- In office 1974 – 20 February 1978
- Monarch: Mohammad Reza Pahlavi
- Prime Minister: Amir-Abbas Hoveyda; Jamshid Amouzegar
- Preceded by: Ezzatollah Zarghami
- Succeeded by: Jafar Shafaghat

Deputy Minister of Finance and Director General of Customs
- Prime Minister: Amir-Abbas Hoveyda
- In office late 1968 – 1974

Personal details
- Born: March 17, 1912 Tehran, Sublime State of Iran
- Died: July 6, 1998 (aged 86) London, United Kingdom

Military service
- Allegiance: Pahlavi Iran
- Branch/service: Imperial Army of Iran
- Years of service: 1930–1968
- Rank: Lieutenant general

Eskandar Azmoudeh (Persian: اسکندر آزموده; 17 March 1912 – 6 July 1998) was an Iranian Lieutenant-general and a Politician during the Pahlavi era.

== Life ==
He was born in 1912 in Tehran. Like his older brother, Amir Hossein Azmoudeh, he served in the military and graduated from the Tehran Officer College, then went on to study in Europe and the United States, where he underwent military tactics. Azmoudeh gained many positions in the army, including Deputy Commander-in-Chief Army

Iran's Deputy Military Assistant in the United Kingdom, Army Command in Persia and Azerbaijan, Head of the Army Procurement Department, Deputy Commander of the Land Forces of the Imperial Army. During the failed coup d'état of 16 August and the successful coup d'état of 19 August 1953 against the government of Mohammad Mosaddegh, Azmoudeh was one of the officers who liaised with MI6 and CIA agents and commanded part of the operation against Mossadegh's government.

He was in charge of the Pahlavi War and was responsible for occupying the Bazaar Telephone Center and the south of the city and the center of Ekbatan. He carried out his mission on 15 August 1953, but knowing that the coup plan had failed, he re-launched the Bazaar Call Center so that his regiment would not be in danger. With the defeat of the coup, many officers were arrested, including Azmoudeh.

After the success of the coup d'état on 19 August 1953, these officers were released and on the day of Mohammad Reza Pahlavi's arrival in the country, all the officers in charge of the coup d'état were promoted to the rank of colonel. He was then assigned to command the Ishratabad Brigade and Barracks. Azmoudeh retired after being promoted to the rank of lieutenant general, and in 1968, Jamshid Amouzegar, Minister of Finance of Hoveyda's government, who was a close relative of his, became the Deputy Minister of Finance and Director General of Customs. General Azmoudeh remained in this position until 1974, when this year his relative Jamshid Amouzegar, the Minister of Interior, once again appointed him governor of East Azerbaijan.

With the beginning of the Islamic revolution, on 20 February 1978, huge demonstrations were held in Tabriz in opposition to the Pahlavi regime, which ended with the killing of people. The governor of the time was recognized as the direct person in charge of the Tabriz event Azmoudeh. For this reason, in order to extinguish the flames of dissatisfaction and calm down the people of Tabriz, on 22 February 1978, Azmoudeh was summoned to Tehran and fired. After a while, he left for England and died in 1998 in London.

== Sources ==
- Taken from the Institute of Contemporary Iranian History Studies
