= Siahkal incident =

1971 leftist guerrilla attack in Iran

- Part of Guerrilla warfare in Iran (1971–1979)
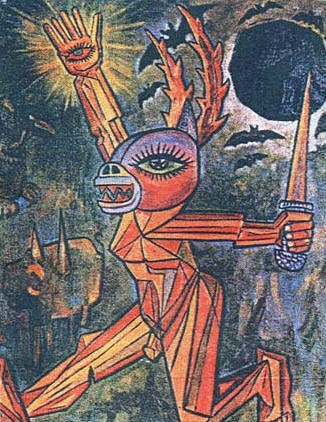
- "Siahkal" painting in cubism style by Bijan Jazani. Jazani painted this while in prison. The deer subsequently became a symbol of the Siahkal uprising.
Date	February 8, 1971
Location	Siahkal, Gilan, Iran
Result	Decisive government victory

Belligerents
Imperial State of Iran	Organization of Iranian People's Fedai Guerrillas (OIPFG)

Commanders and leaders
Mohammad Reza Pahlavi; Fereydoun Djam; Gholam Ali Oveissi; Fathollah Minbashian; Jafargholi Sadrii; Nematollah Nassiri	Ali Akbar Safayi Farahani; Hamid Ashraf

Units involved
Imperial Gendarmerie; Imperial Iranian Army; Shahrbani; SAVAK	"Jungle Group" (9–13 members)

Casualties and losses
3 killed in action (Gendarmes)	2 killed in action 11 executed

The Siahkal incident (Persian: واقعه سیاهکل) or Siahkal movement (Persian: جنبش سیاهکل) was a pivotal armed raid conducted on 8 February 1971 by members of the Fadaiyan-e-Khalq, an underground Iranian Marxist–Leninist guerrilla organization. Executed by a specialized clandestine cell known as the "Jungle Group" (Gorooh-e Jangal), the operation targeted a regional gendarmerie outpost in the forests of Gilan province. The primary objective was to secure the release of two captured Fadaee comrades. During the assault on the Siahkal station, three Gendarmes were killed, resulting in the temporary liberation of the detainees. While the insurgents were eventually hunted down by the Imperial Iranian Army and SAVAK, the event is historically regarded as the formal inception of organized urban guerrilla warfare by the Fadaee against the Pahlavi dynasty.

== Aftermath and suppression ==
In the wake of the Siahkal raid, the Pahlavi government launched a coordinated crackdown to dismantle the burgeoning guerrilla movement. Within the first year following the incident, SAVAK successfully neutralized or apprehended nearly all the founding members of the Fadaian organization. The regime’s response was characterized by extreme severity; notably, the authorities executed Bijan Jazani, the preeminent theoretician of the armed struggle, along with members of his group who had been imprisoned even before the Siahkal events took place.

By the end of 1976, the operational capacity of the Fadaian was largely suppressed, with their influence primarily confined to university campuses. This indicated a strategic failure to mobilize the broader masses into an active armed struggle. However, despite sustaining heavy operational losses and systemic leadership decapitation, both the Fadaian and the Mujahedin-e Khalq (MEK) remained the only viable underground guerrilla factions at the onset of the 1979 Revolution.

Thirteen people were eventually convicted and executed for their participation in the incident, including two individuals who were already in prison at the time of the raid.

In March 1971, the first direct armed clashes occurred between state security forces—comprising the Imperial Iranian Army and SAVAK—and the guerrilla insurgents. Over the following months, SAVAK apprehended an additional 50 revolutionaries allegedly linked to the Siahkal network. During a high-profile press and television briefing, Parviz Sabeti, the director of SAVAK's Third Department, provided a detailed account of the operations used to track and dismantle the so-called "Siahkal Group."

While the success of the operation bolstered Sabeti's reputation as a formidable security chief, it simultaneously drew international scrutiny toward SAVAK’s methods, which were increasingly criticized for their brutality.

Within this broader geopolitical context, SAVAK’s internal security activities remained closely coordinated with international partners, most notably the CIA, whose influence on Iranian domestic policy was becoming more pronounced.

== Allegations of torture and interrogations ==
According to opposition accounts and historical testimonies, SAVAK utilized sophisticated and severe interrogation techniques against captured insurgents. A prominent member of the Mashhad-based Fadaian group, Mehdi Savalani, reportedly had both legs broken by SAVAK agents before being executed. Similarly, the commander of the "Jungle Group," Ali Akbar Safayi Farahani, fell into the hands of SAVAK investigators and was subjected to intense interrogation; contemporary accounts suggest that the treatment he received was fatal, leading to his death while in custody.

In June 1979, during the post-revolutionary trials of SAVAK officials, Bahman Naderipour (known by the pseudonym "Tehrani"), a key investigator for 16 years, confessed to the systemic torture of hundreds of detainees and the killing of dozens. Regarding the 1971 events, Tehrani stated: "The Anti-Sabotage Joint Committee was very successful in its early stages, identifying and neutralizing several armed political groups... among them were members of the so-called Siahkal Group."

== Historical legacy ==
The Siahkal incident demonstrated that, despite the extensive surveillance and operational capabilities of SAVAK, it was possible to organize clandestine revolutionary cells within Iran, similar to contemporary movements in Italy (Years of Lead), West Germany (German Autumn), or the Irish republican movement in the United Kingdom (The Troubles). For many historians, this event marks the beginning of the "guerrilla era" in modern Iranian history—a period of militant opposition that fundamentally altered the political landscape leading up to the 1979 Revolution.

== Bibliography ==
- Kandell, Jonathan (June 18, 1979). "SAVAK Agent Describes How He Tortured Hundreds". The New York Times.
- Intercontinental Press (1972). Intercontinental Press, Volume 10. Intercontinental Press.
- Istituto per l'Oriente (1972). Oriente Moderno, Volume 52 (in Italian). Istituto per l'Oriente.
- Iranian Students' Association in Northern California (1971). The Regime of the Shah Steps Up Political Repression in Iran as it Prepares for the Celebration of 2500 Year [sic] of Iranian Monarchy. The Association. p. 16.
- Burney, Iqbal Hasan (1972). Outlook, Volume 1, Issues 2–52. I. H. Burney.
- Abrahamian, Ervand (1982). Iran Between Two Revolutions. Princeton University Press. p. 561. ISBN 978-0691101347.
- Mottahedeh, Roy (2000). The Mantle of the Prophet: Religion and Politics in Iran. One World. ISBN 978-1851682348.
- Joint Publications Research Service (1979). Translations on Near East and North Africa, Issue 1964. Joint Publications Research Service.
- Buchan, James (2012). Days of God: The Revolution in Iran and Its Consequences. Simon & Schuster. p. 432. ISBN 978-1416597773.
- Parsa, Misagh (1989). Social Origins of the Iranian Revolution. Rutgers University Press. p. 348. ISBN 978-0813514123.
- Halliday, Fred (1975). Arabia without Sultans: A political survey of instability in the Arab world. Vintage Books. p. 539. ISBN 978-0394715292.
- Cooper, Andrew Scott (2012). The Oil Kings: How the U.S., Iran, and Saudi Arabia Changed the Balance of Power in the Middle East. Simon & Schuster. p. 544. ISBN 978-1439155189.
- Nima, Ramy (1983). The Wrath of Allah: Islamic Revolution and Reaction in Iran. Pluto Press. ISBN 978-0861047338.
- Matin-Asgari, Afshin (2001). Iranian Student Opposition to the Shah. Mazda Publishers. p. 286. ISBN 978-1568590790.
- Spencer, Robert (2016). The Complete Infidel's Guide to Iran. Regnery Publishing. p. 256. ISBN 978-1621575160.
- Daneshvar, Parviz (1996). Revolution in Iran. Macmillan Press. p. 237. ISBN 978-1349140640.
- Plate, Thomas Gordon (1981). Secret Police: The Inside Story of a Network of Terror. Doubleday. p. 458. ISBN 978-0385171564.
- Irnberger, Harald (1977). SAVAK: Oder, Der Folterfreund des Westens: aus d. Akten d. iran. Geheimdienstes (in German). Rowohlt. p. 116. ISBN 978-3499141829.
