= Maximilien Jazani =

French activist

Maximilien Jazani is a lawyer and corporate finance adviser focusing on music and entertainment sector. After 25 years as a Lawyer ("Avocat"), he's been engaged by Catalogue Associates Limited (UK) as independent general counsel. Catalogue Associates is an agency specializing in the sale of music (rights) catalogues. Previously, Avocat (attorney at Law) at Bar since 1996, he ended by setting up his own law firm in 2005 after having had a 9 year practice in several international law firms.

== Childhood and Education ==
Maximilien Jazani obtained a “baccalaureat” of French litters philosophy and mathematics. He then went to the Paris University of Law. He very soon won the First Prize of Constitutional Law and obtained a Master (DESS) of Business and Taxation Law from Paris Pantheon Assas Law University.

In 1997 Jazani became a member of the Association of the Business Lawyers (ACE). He was elected president of the Human Rights Commission of ACE in 1997 and 1998. He participated in the great reform of French criminal procedure in 1998, was received by the Minister of Justice, Élisabeth Guigou and made nine proposals for reform of the French code of criminal procedure.

Jazani advocated for the protection of the lawyers' secrecy (client's privilege) always in the perspective of the improvement of the arms length procedure.

== Publications ==
Jazani has published numerous articles in the matters of Human Rights, taxation and Music and Live show.
