= Hamid Ashraf =

Iranian activist

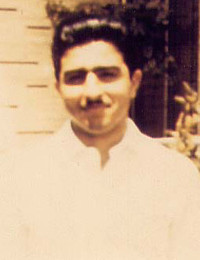
- Born: December 31, 1946; Tehran
- Died: June 29, 1976 (aged 29)
- Organization: Organization of Iranian People's Fedai Guerrillas

Hamid Ashraf (Persian: حمید اشرف; December 31, 1946 – June 29, 1976) was one of the original members and later the leader of the Organization of Iranian People's Fedai Guerrillas (OIPFG) that waged a guerrilla warfare against the former Pahlavi regime in Iran from February 8, 1971, till February 11, 1979, the Shah's fall. Hamid Ashraf played a key role in consolidating the OIPFG as a militant armed organisation against the Shah's regime.

== Personal life ==
Hamid Ashraf was born in Tehran to an educated middle-class family. He was raised in Tehran and, for a few years, in Tabriz. He entered Tehran University, first as a physics students and then engineering. He was already involved in politics as a member of a newly formed underground leftist group called Jazani-Zarifi group in the Iranian left history. He was active in student movement as well as in sports, being the head of swimming team at the school of engineering at Tehran University. He had just been introduced to Bijan Jazani by his friend Farrokh Negahdar in 1965. This was when Jazani-Zarifi group, a leftist circle preparing for waging a guerrilla warfare in Iran against the regime. However, Jazani-Zarifi group was discovered by the secret police in 1968. Hamid Ashraf and a number of members were not disclosed to the SAVAK and survived the crackdown.

== Armed Struggle ==
In 1968 the leadership of Jazani group was imprisoned before they had a chance to actually start an armed uprising. From that point on Ashraf played a key role in keeping the group together and preparing it for action. On February 8, 1971, the mountain guerrilla band of the group under the command of Ali Akbar Safaei Farahani launched an attack on the police station in Siahkal in northern Iran. Soon after the operation, which practically started a new era of armed struggle against the Shah's regime, Hamid Ashraf went into hiding. For the next five years, under his leadership the OIPFG solidified its underground network and expanded its operations including high profile assassinations of some military and security officers. Because of his track record in avoiding ambushes and his long survival under intense persecution, he had become an "obsession" to the Shah.

After a long and elaborated planning by the Shah's secret police SAVAK on June 29, 1976, the safe house where he and a number of members of cadres of OIPFG were captured alive. He was shot dead while on the roof seemingly trying to make his escape from the ambush. Following this incidence the OIPFG only managed to survive with minimal activities until the 1978-79 revolution took place. Two pamphlets written by Ashraf have been published: "A three-year Review", and "An Analysis of One Year of Urban and Mountain Guerrilla Warfare: How did the Siahkal Insurrection Begin?

== Sources ==
- "Videos Oral History Project Iranian left". International Institute of Social History. Archived from the original on 2006-10-18.
- Zabih, Sepehr (1986-01-01). The Left in Contemporary Iran: Ideology, Organisation, and the Soviet Connection. Croom Helm. ISBN 978-0-8179-8421-2.
