= Azizollah Zarghami =

Iranian Military Officer (1884–1978)

Timsar Azizollah Zarghami
- عزیزالله ضرغامی
- Zarghami in 1930
- Born: 1884; Tehran, Qajar Iran
- Died: 1978 (aged 93–94); Tehran, Pahlavi Iran
- Burial place: Imamzadeh Abdollah, Ray
- Education: Cossack training school
- Children: Ezzatollah Zarghami; Heydar Zarghami
- Military career
- Allegiance: Qajar Iran (1920s–1925); Pahlavi Iran (1925–1941)
- Branch: Persian Cossack Brigade (1920s–1921); Imperial Iranian Ground Forces (1921–1941)
- Service years: 1920s–1941
- Rank: Major General
- Commands: Chief of the Joint Staff (1934–1941); Iranian Gendarmerie (1930–1934); Makran Brigade
- Conflicts: Persian tribal uprisings of 1929; Jafar Sultan revolt; Goharshad Mosque rebellion; World War II; Anglo-Soviet invasion of Iran

Azizollah Zarghami (Persian: عزیزالله ضرغامی; 1884–1978) was an Iranian army officer. He served as the Chief of the Joint Staff of the Imperial Iranian Army in Iran in the period 1934–1941 during the rule of Reza Shah.

== Biography ==
Zarghami was born in Tehran in 1884. His father was Hossein Pashakhan Zargham al-Saltanah, one of the leaders of the Shaqaqi tribe. Zarghami trained at the Cossack school. He remained with the Cossacks until he was promoted to captain.

Later, he was transferred to the Gendarmerie and held several positions there, such as the head of the gendarmerie of Qazvin, Zanjan, and Soltanabad. After the formation of the Unified Army, he was transferred there and was assigned to establish the schools of the regime with the rank of colonel. He was there for two years when he was appointed as the head of the Army's stewardship office. Then he became the commander of the Makran Brigade and attained the rank of brigadier general. In 1930, he was appointed head of the Gendarmerie of the country. He was named the Chief of the Joint Staff in 1934. As the Anglo-Soviet invasion of Iran began in 1941, Reza Shah ordered Zarghami, as Army Chief of Staff, to deploy the Central Garrison to defend the capital, but offered no instructions for the divisions under attack. After Reza Shah finally ordered a cease-fire, much of the army disintegrated. When Reza Shah abdicated Zarghami lost his position and was appointed head of the Officers' Academy.

No other military work was assigned to him after that, until the year 1949 when he became an appointed senator in the first term of the Senate, serving for one term.

In 1961, Zarghami and three other generals were arrested as part of the anti-corruption campaign of Prime Minister Ali Amini and were released soon. Zarghami died in Tehran in 1978 and was buried in the Imamzadeh Abdollah cemetery, Tehran. One of his children, Ezzatollah Zarghami, was also an army officer with the rank of General who Later served as the senator and governor of East Azerbaijan.

Military offices
Preceded by ?	Commandant of the Officers' Academy; 1941	Succeeded by Abdollah Hedayat
Preceded by Mohammad Nakhjavan	Chief of the Joint Staff of the Imperial Iranian Armed Forces; 3 May 1934–23 September 1941	Succeeded by Morteza Yazdanpanah
Preceded by Morteza Yazdanpanah	Commander of the Iranian Gendarmerie; April 1930–August 1934	Succeeded by Gholam-Ali Zand
