= Ezzatollah Zarghami (general) =

Iranian military officer (1908–2003)

Timsar Ezzatollah Zarghami
- عزت‌الله ضرغامی

Member of the Iranian Senate
- In office 1975–1979

Governor of East Azerbaijan
- In office 16 December 1971 – 1974
- Monarch: Mohammad Reza Pahlavi
- Prime Minister: Amir-Abbas Hoveyda
- Preceded by: Taghi Sarlak
- Succeeded by: Eskandar Azmoudeh

Commander of the Imperial Iranian Ground Forces
- In office 1965 – 11 May 1969
- Monarch: Mohammad Reza Pahlavi
- Prime Minister: Amir-Abbas Hoveyda
- Preceded by: Reza Azimi
- Succeeded by: Fathollah Minbashian

Deputy Chief of the Joint Staff
- In office 1960–1965

Director of the First Bureau
- In office ?–?

Personal details
- Born: 1908 Tehran, Qajar Iran
- Died: 2003 (aged 94–95)
- Children: Mehdi Zarghamee
- Parent: Azizollah Zarghami

Military service
- Allegiance: Pahlavi Iran
- Branch/service: Ground Force
- Years of service: 1927–1969
- Rank: General
- Commands: Khorasan Division (1955–1960)
- Battles/wars: World War II; Anglo-Soviet invasion of Iran; 1962–1964 Tribal Rebellion of Fars; 1963 demonstrations in Iran; 1967 Kurdish revolt in Iran; Joint Operation Arvand

Ezzatollah Zarghami (1908–2003) was an Iranian military officer and commander in the Imperial Iranian Armed Forces. he commanded the Imperial Iranian ground forces from 1965 to 1969.

== Biography ==
Ezzatollah Zarghami was the son of Major General Azizollah Zarghami and father of Mehdi Zarghamee.

Zarghami graduated from the Officers' College in 1927 and graduated in 1929 with the rank of Second Lieutenant.

In 1939, he was promoted to Major and entered the Command and Staff College. In 1942, he attained the rank of Lieutenant Colonel and two years later was promoted to Colonel.

He attained the rank of Brigadier General in 1951.

In 1955, he was appointed a member of the Military Court that reviewed the case of Mohammad Mosaddegh, where he voted to uphold the court's verdict.

In October 1955, he was promoted to Major General, and in October 1960 he attained the rank of Lieutenant General.

During his career he was the head of the Faculty of the Officers' College, Chief of the first Bureau, and commander of the Khorasan Division. He eventually became the Deputy chief of the joint staff. He then became the commander of the ground forces 1965–1969 and retired. After retirement, he became the governor of East Azerbaijan and then a senator in the seventh term of the Senate of Iran.
