= Amir Hossein Azmoudeh =

Iranian military officer (1908–1998)

Timsar Amir Hossein Azmoudeh
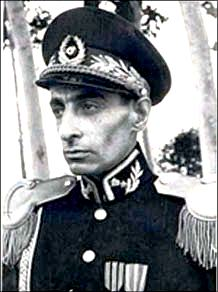
- Born: 1908; Tehran
- Died: 1998 (aged 89–90); France
- Military career
- Branch: Imperial Iranian Army
- Rank: Lieutenant general
- Commands: Chief of the General Staff of the Army; Military Governor of Tehran

Amir Hossein Azmoudeh (Persian: امیرحسین آزموده; born in 1908 in Tehran - died in 1998 in France) was one of the senior soldiers of the Pahlavi period. After graduating, he joined the Imperial Army of Iran and the University of War. After his military education, he studied law at the University of Tehran and later became an army prosecutor. In 1927 he was promoted to the rank of lieutenant and in 1938 to the rank of major. He was an opponent of Mohammad Mossadegh's government and was appointed to the army prosecutor's office immediately after the coup d'état of August 19, 1953.

== Issuance of imprisonment of Mohammad Mossadegh and execution of Seyed Hossein Fatemi ==
On September 15, 1953, after the first interrogation session, Mohammad Mossadegh was convicted of plotting against the government, undermining the foundations of the government, arranging the throne, and inciting the people to take up arms against the monarchy. Mohammad Mossadegh was sentenced to three years in solitary confinement and sentenced to death in 1954. Hossein Fatemi was sentenced to death. Was discovered by revolutionaries in the safe of his house.

== The title of Eichmann of Iran ==
Noureddin Alamouti, Minister of Justice in Ali Amini's Government "Azmoudeh ordered political prisoners to be flown by military plane to Salt Lake in the dark of night and dropped from the sky into the lake," he said. He then removed the names and details of these people from the list of prisoners so that they would not be identified:

"What ruthless innocent youth did not kill these ruthless people. Do you know what he was doing? "He ordered political prisoners to be flown around Qom at night and thrown into the salt lake." Blory: Then the Minister of Justice described the crimes that had been tried, and I listened intently to memorize the words.

=== Documentary by Mohammad Blouri ===
"During the previous regime, I spent years researching and finding new facts about the arbitrary execution of political prisoners by General Hossein Azmoudeh by burying these prisoners alive in the depths of Qom Salt Lake, but despite the political difficulties that SAVAK had," he said. Brought failed; Until I found out in the early 1970s that a research team had gone to the shores of Qom Salt Lake, and people who lived on the shores of the lake said that some nights we heard the roar of an airplane flying over the lake with a flashing light and then turning away. . "Things seemed to be thrown into the lake, but it was not possible to go to the salt-soaked waters due to the dangerous swamp on the lake shore."

In a documentary about his 63 years of journalistic memories in 2009, Blori traveled to a small village called "Deh Shoor" on the shores of Qom Salt Lake with the film crew and talked closely with the locals.

"One night shepherds living on the shore of the lake reported that a sack containing a man's body had fallen from a plane into the lake, but apparently did not fall due to the plane spinning in the water," said the head of the village council. Instead, by mistake, the sack pilot sank halfway into the swamp sludge on the edge of the lake. "This sack bag sank into the swamp a few hours later, and since then we have learned that people are put in a sack somewhere and brought by plane and thrown into the lake at night ...".
