= Siahkal =

City in Gilan province, Iran

Siahkal Persian: سياهكل
- City
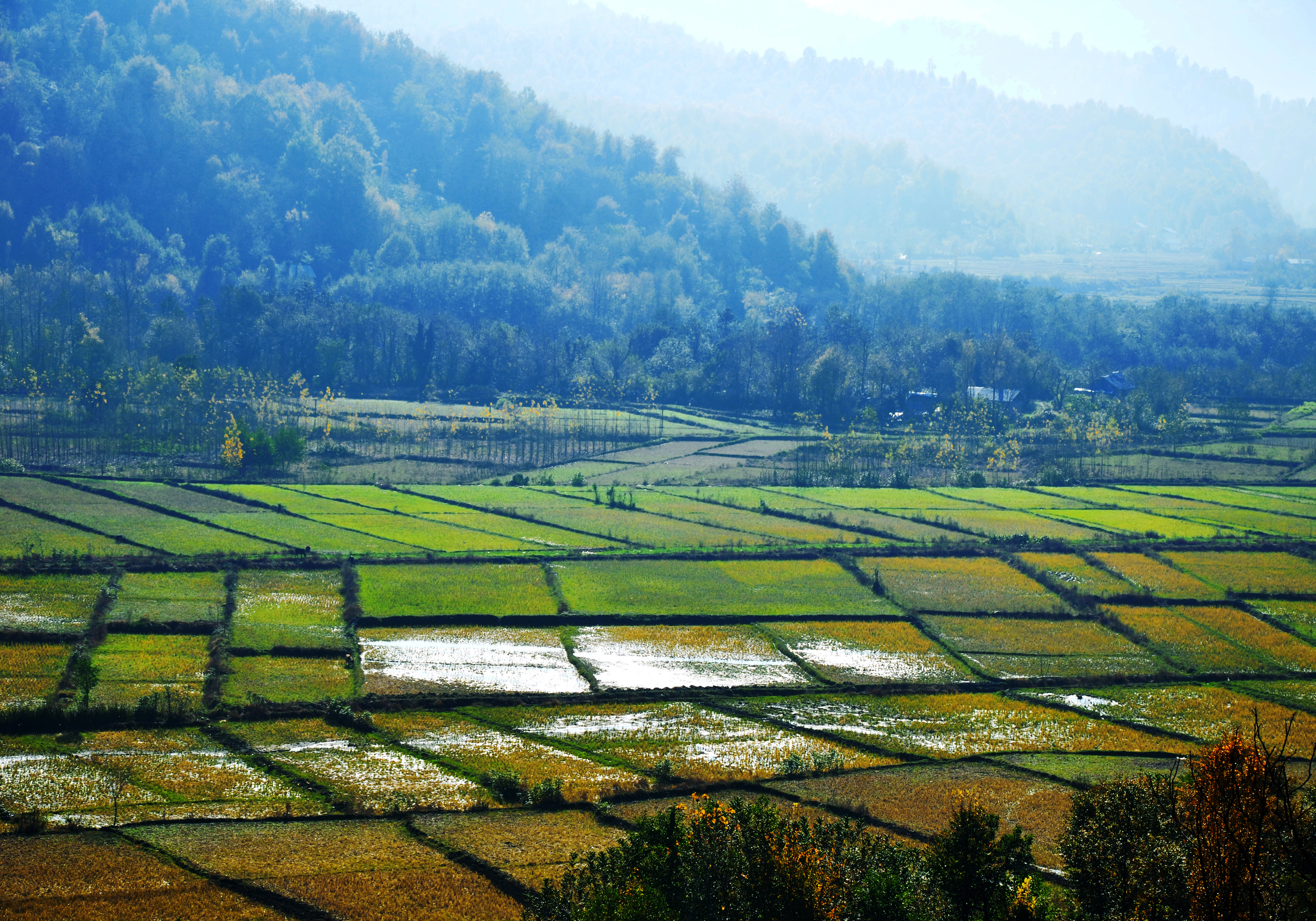

- Location within Iran
- Coordinates: 37°09′13″N 49°52′16″E
- Country: Iran
- Province: Gilan
- County: Siahkal
- District: Central

Population (2016)
  - Total: 19,924
- Time zone: UTC+3:30 (IRST)

Siahkal (Persian: سياهكل) (Note: Also romanized as Seyāh Kal, Sīāh Kal, Sīāhkal, and Sīyāh Kal; also known as Sīāhkal Maḩalleh; Gilaki: سي ٚ کل) is a city in the Central District of Siahkal County, Gilan province, Iran, serving as capital of both the county and the district. As of 2016, the city had a population of 19,924.

== History ==
Siahkal was the scene of the 1971 Marxist Siahkal uprising.

=== The Jewish community ===
There used to be a sizeable Jewish community in Siahkal with synagogue(s) and neighborhoods. The written historical sources on this community are limited, and mostly lost to history limited, as the Gilan province was largely isolated, and mostly ignored in history, but they might have been present since antiquity given speaking the Judeo-Siahkali dialect, as opposed to other Jewish communities of Gilan and surrounding provinces. The community married among themselves and had a long tradition that they were descendants of King David. Some were descendants of Jews of Dilaman, who were ordered by Nadir Shah Afshar in the year 1746 to relocate to Mashhad.

The community faced one or several pogroms and mass conversions in recent history based on their collective memory. Possibly, around 1880, there was a pogrom in Siahkal in which many Jews were killed, many were subjected to forceful conversion to Islam, and others left the city to live in Rasht (Netzer, Siahkal). In the following years, Many of the remaining members of this isolated community converted to Baháʼí Faith, Islam, or joined the Marxist movement. Others gradually left the town, commenced by events of the pogrom of 1880, the Marxist insurrection of 1921, the Soviet Occupation, and then as well as the establishment of the state of Israel in 1948, which prompted emigration of the remaining practicing Jews to either Israel, Rasht, Tehran, or the United States;.

== Demographics ==
=== Language and ethnicity ===
Siahkal's population is Gilak and the city's main language is Gilaki language.

=== Population ===
At the time of the 2006 National Census, the city's population was 15,274 in 4,343 households. The following census in 2011 counted 18,176 people in 5,645 households. The 2016 census measured the population of the city as 19,924 people in 6,796 households.

== Tourist attractions ==
- Lonak Waterfall
- Baba Vali Waterfall
- Larikhani Forest and Spring
- Dorfak Mountain
- Ti Ti Caravanserai
- Garmavar Castle
- Kutul Shah Castle
- Siahkal-Deylaman Road and Forest
- Pashuran Park and Pool
- Rice Farms
- Gilarkesh Rock Shelter
- Azodi House
- Mineral Water Springs
- Siahkal's Weekly Market
- Shrine of Qader the Prophet
- Shrine of Baba Vali
- Shrine of Saleh and Sultain Hussein
- Imamzadeh Mustafa

== Education ==
- Sama Vocational Academy
- Islamic Azad University has a campus in Siahkal.
- Payame Noor University has a campus in Siahkal.

== Gallery ==
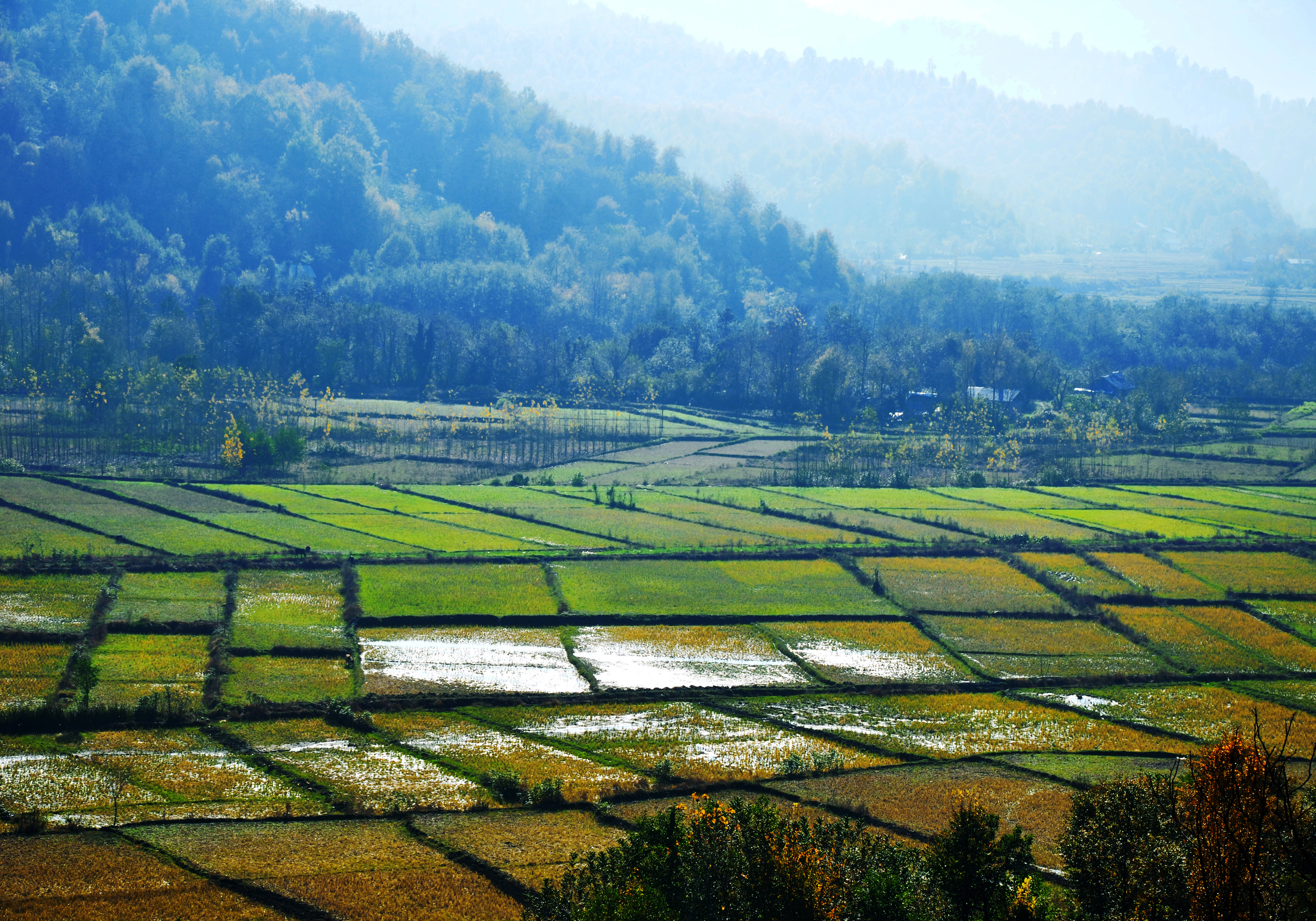

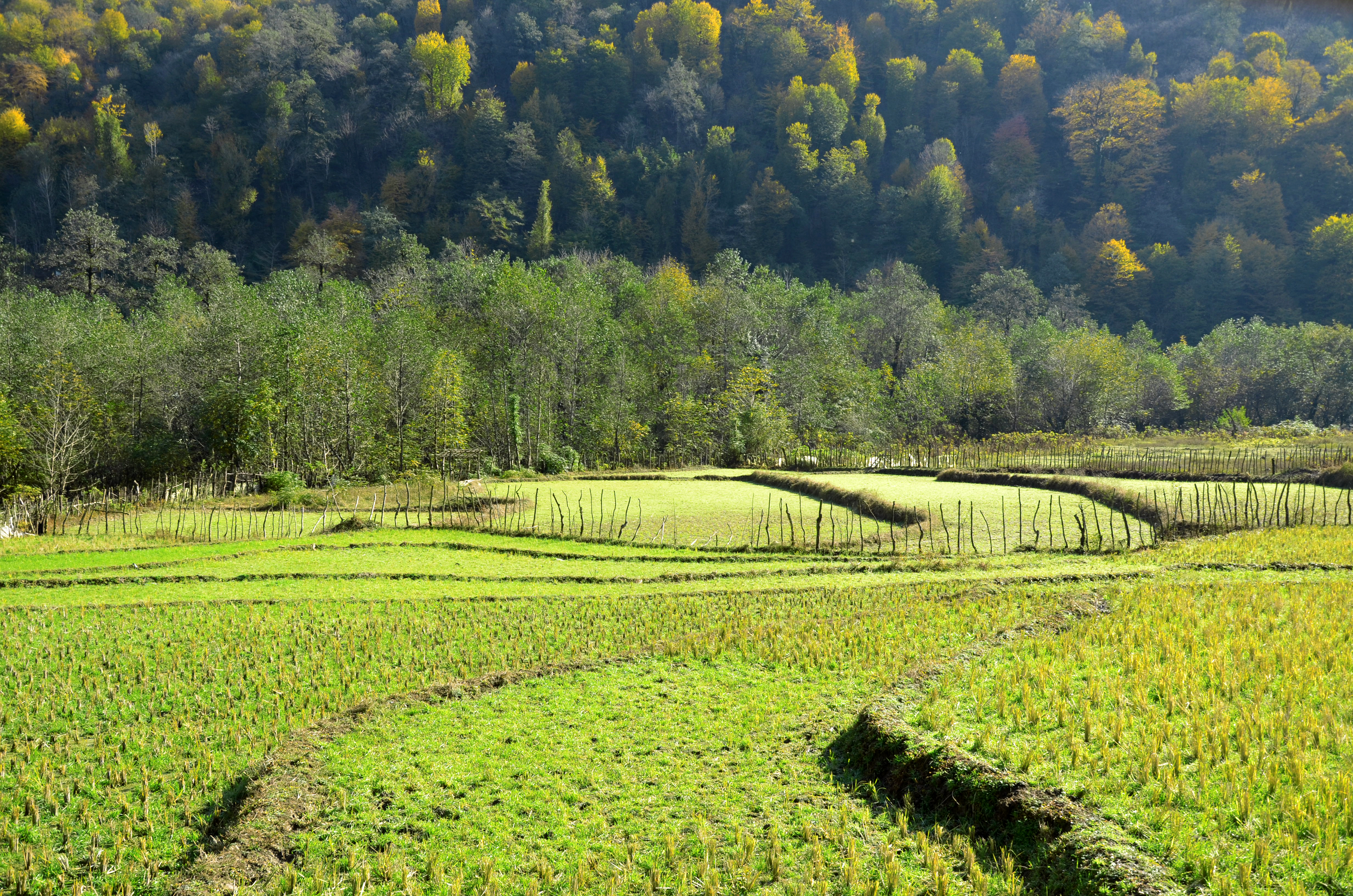

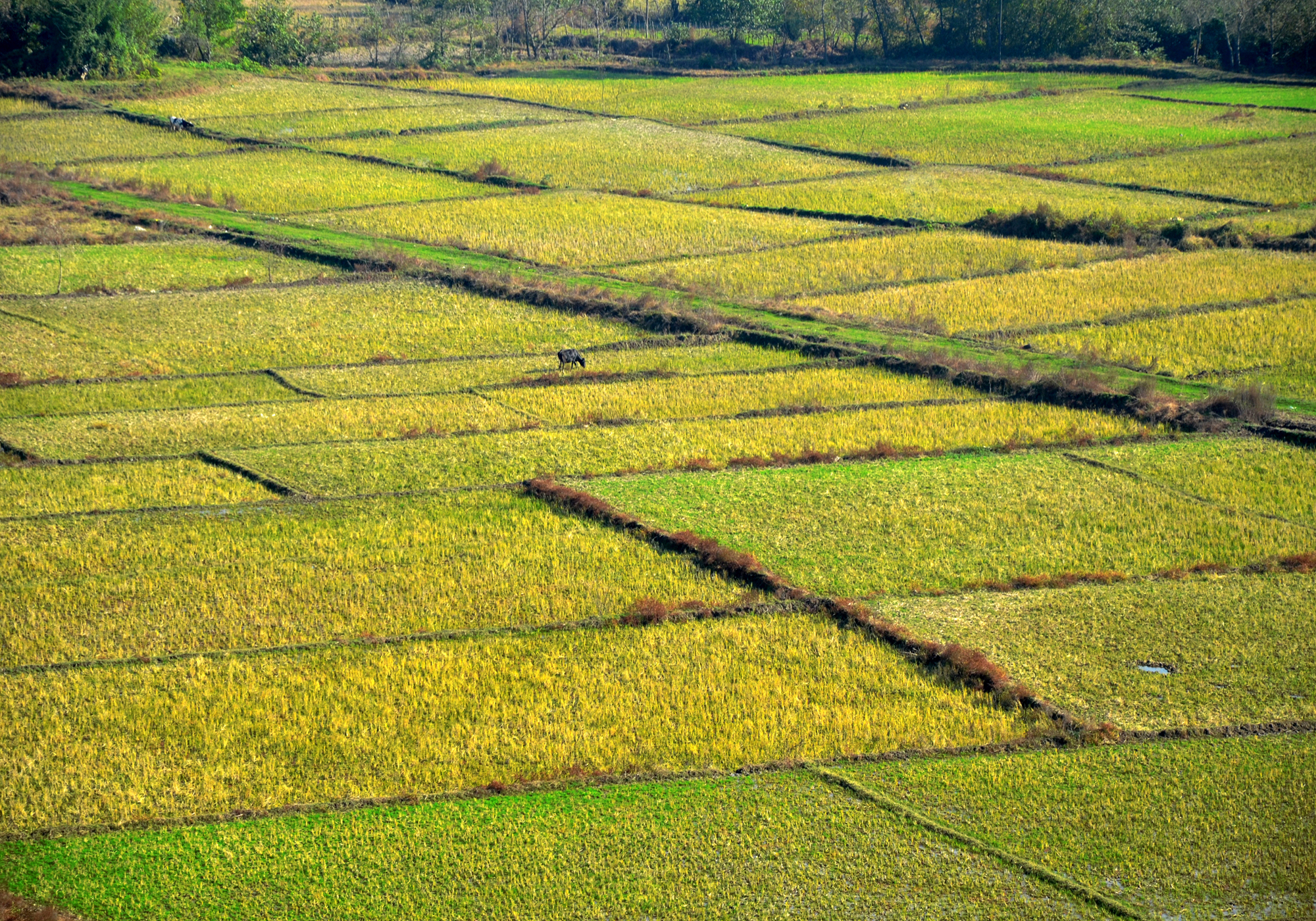

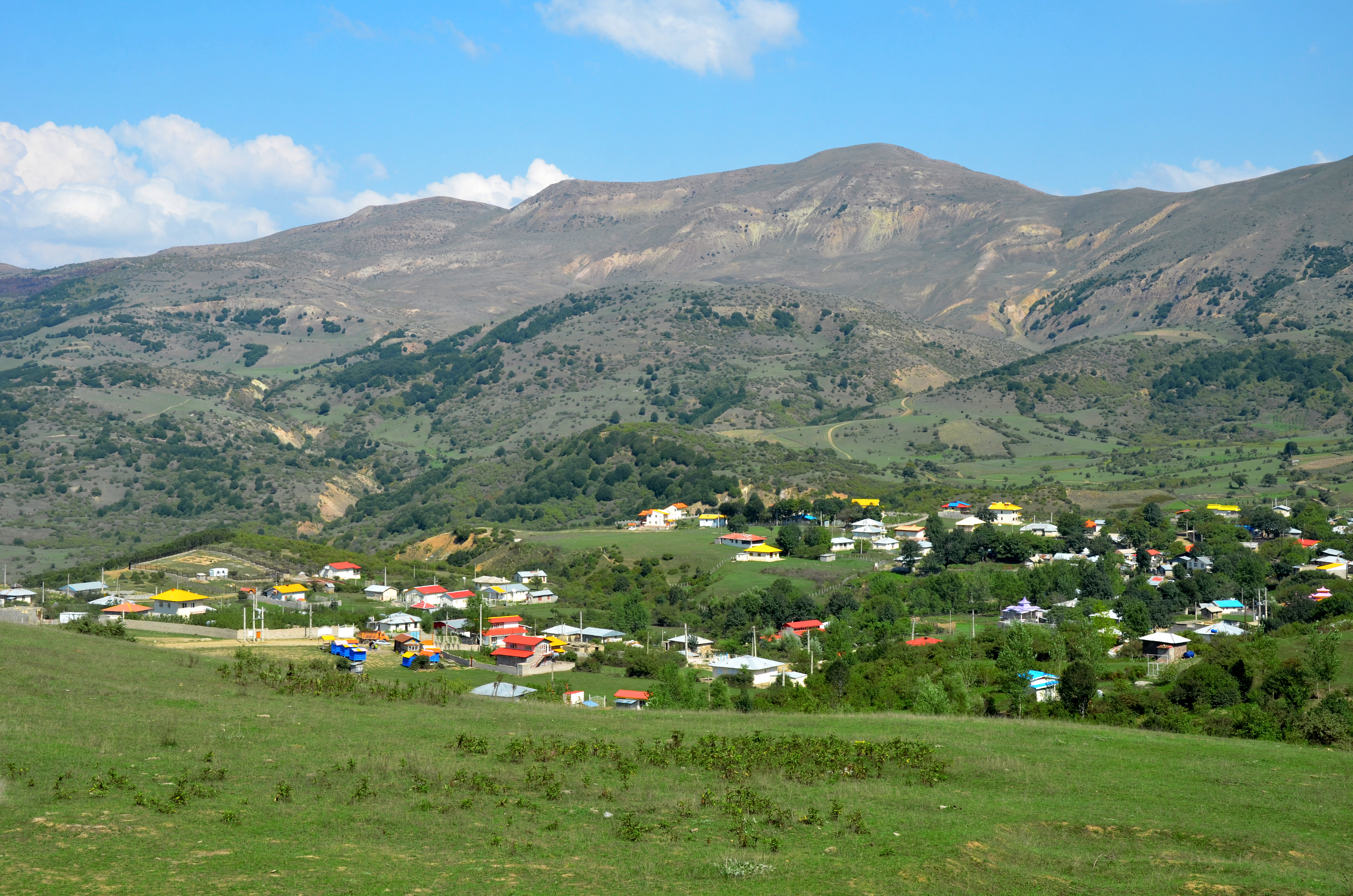

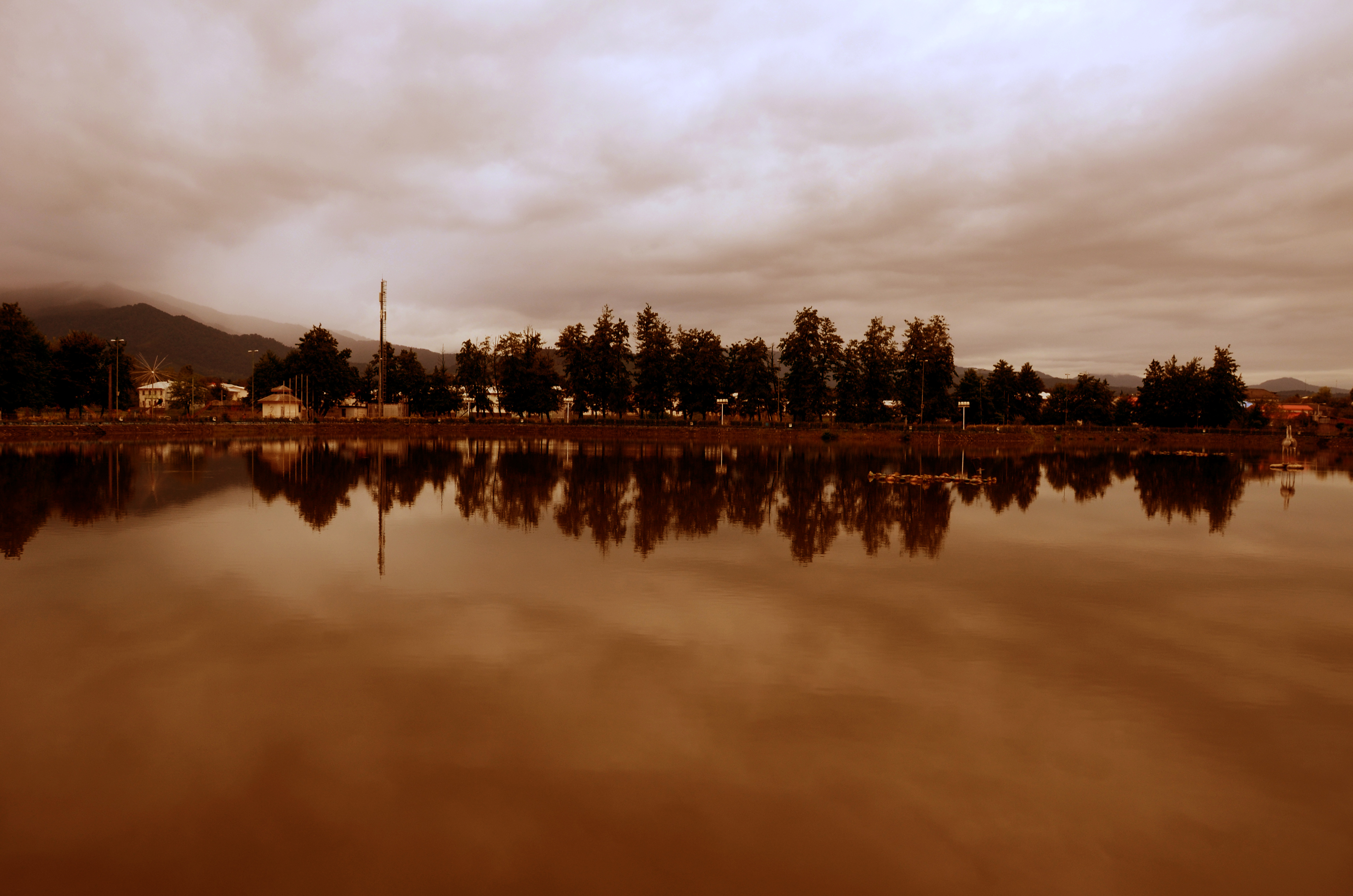

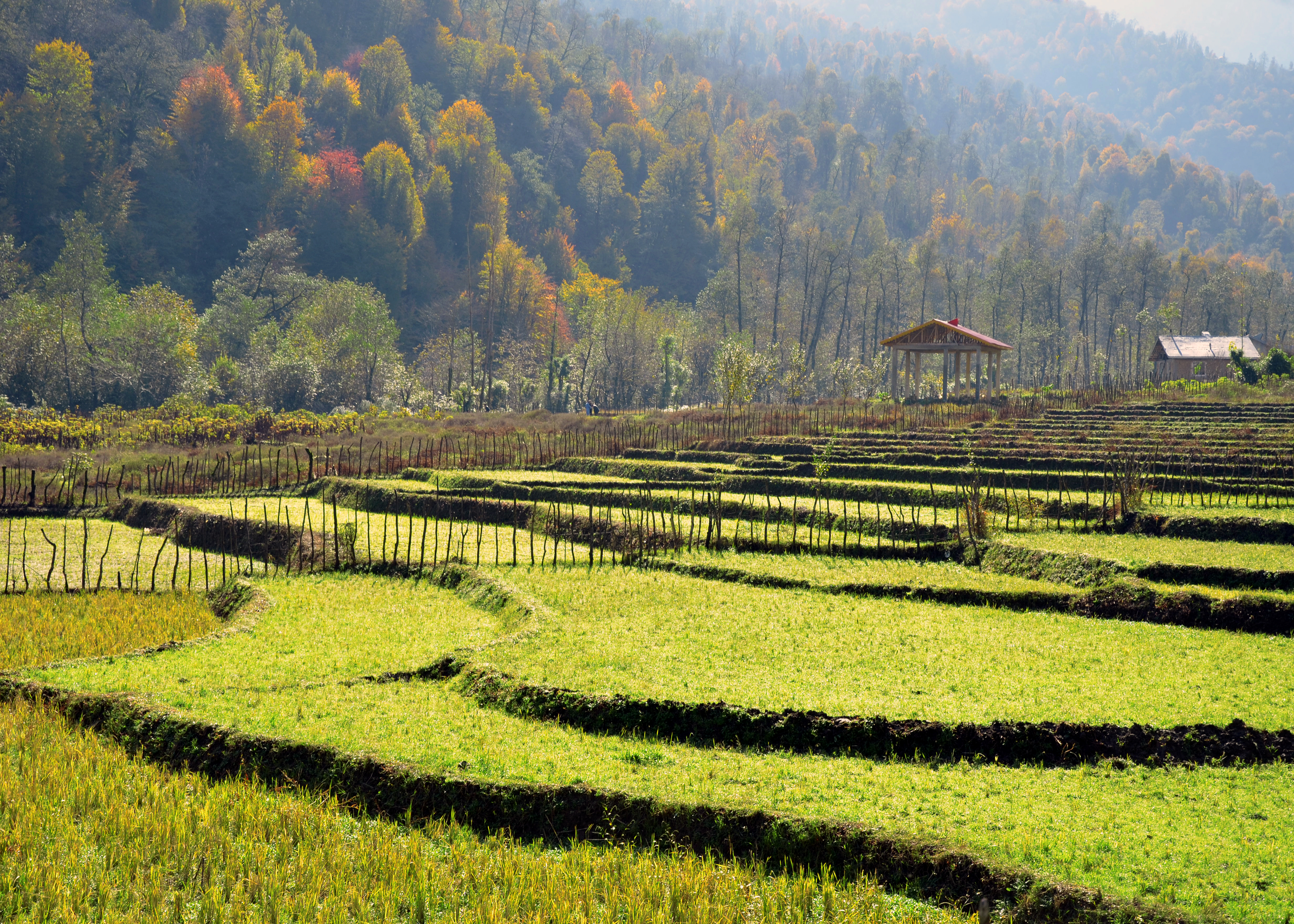

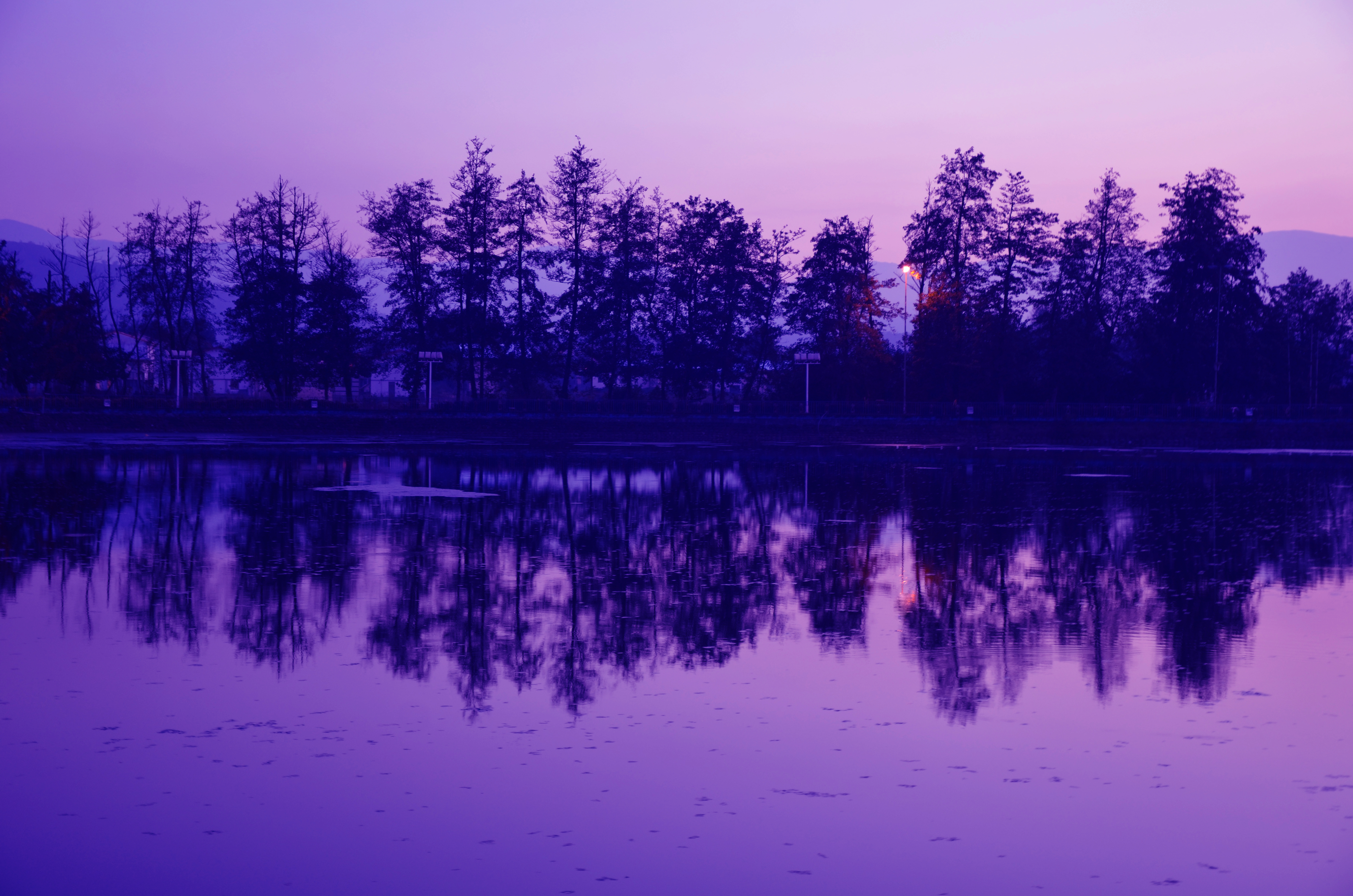

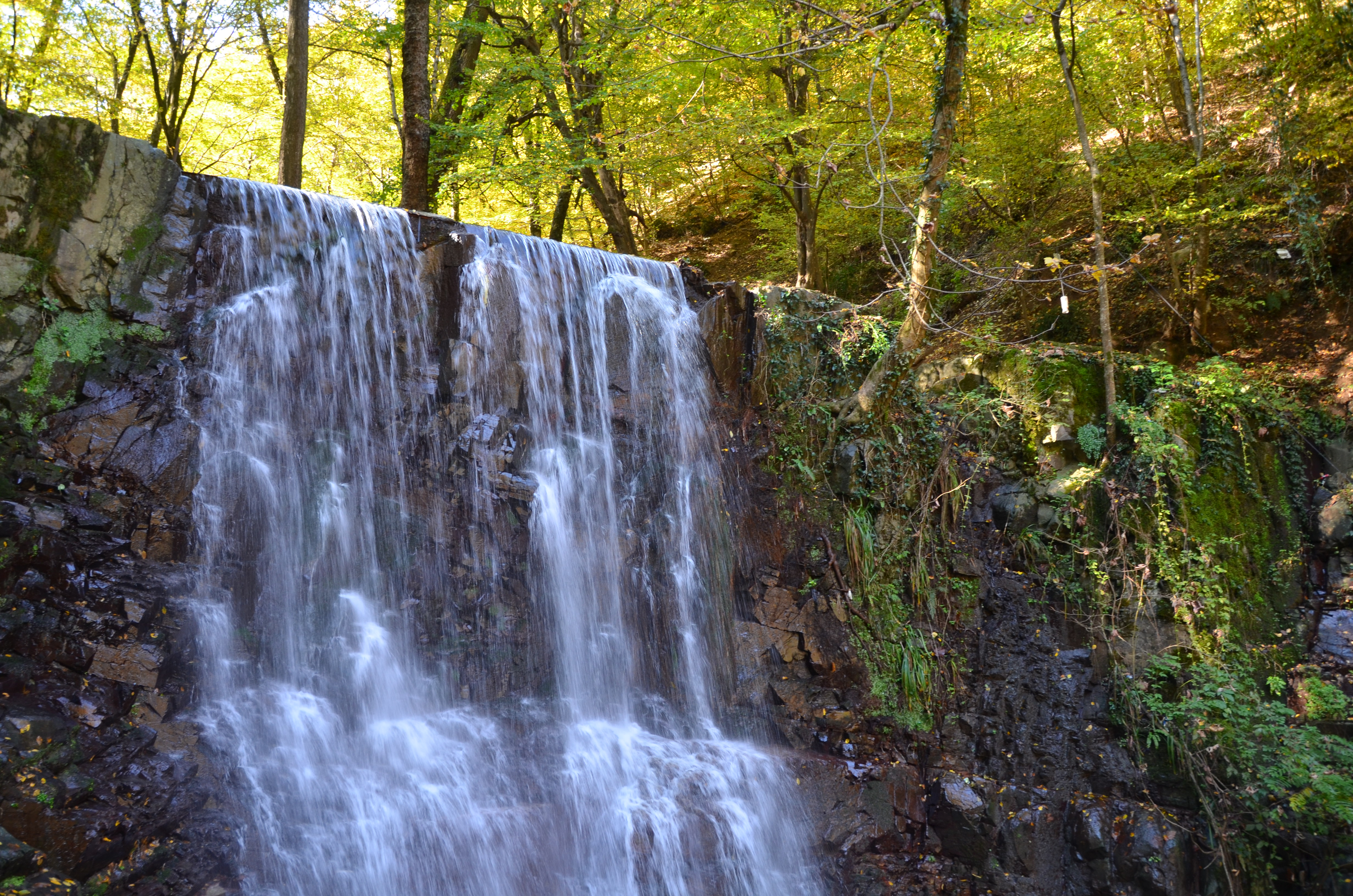

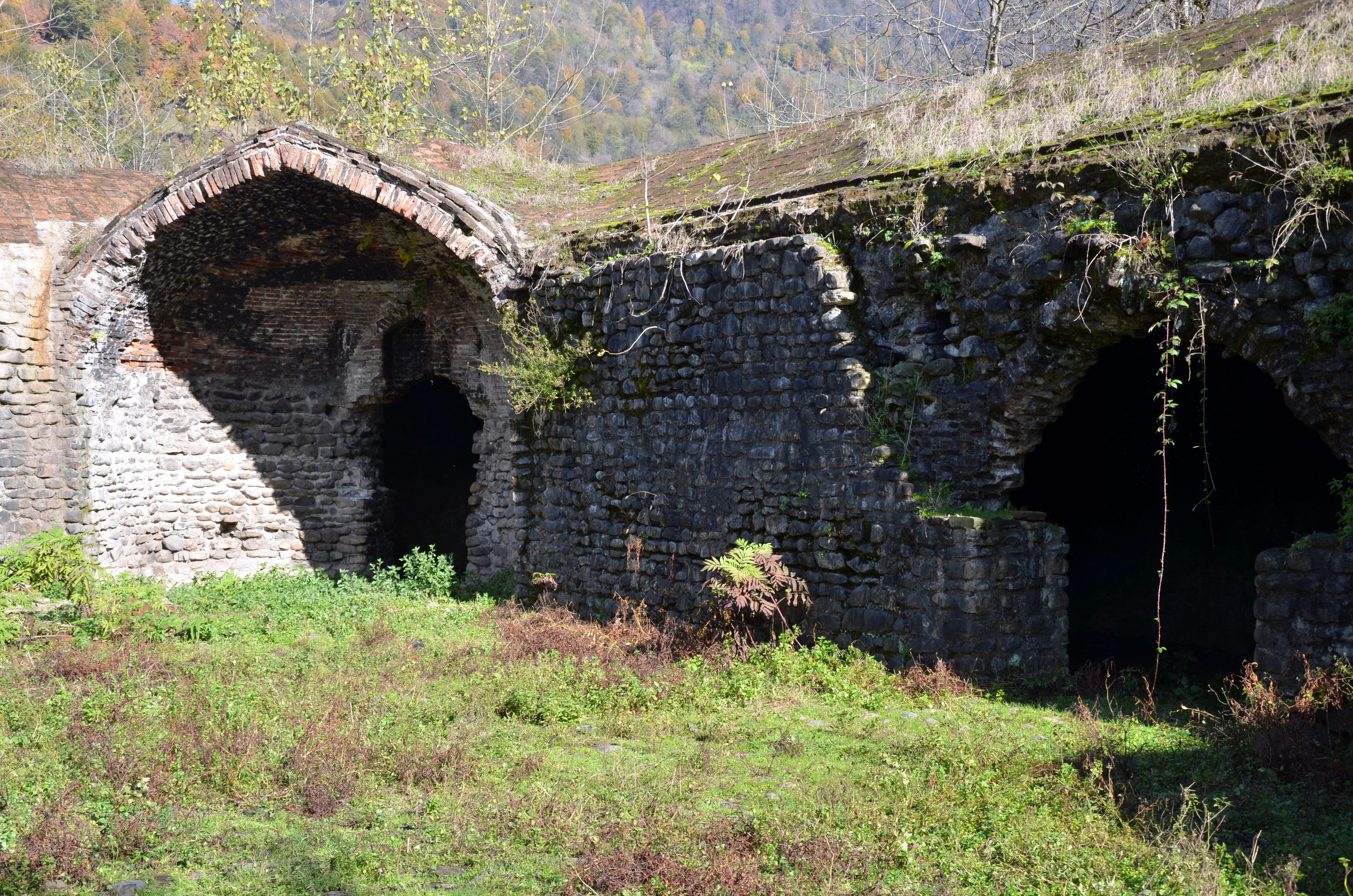

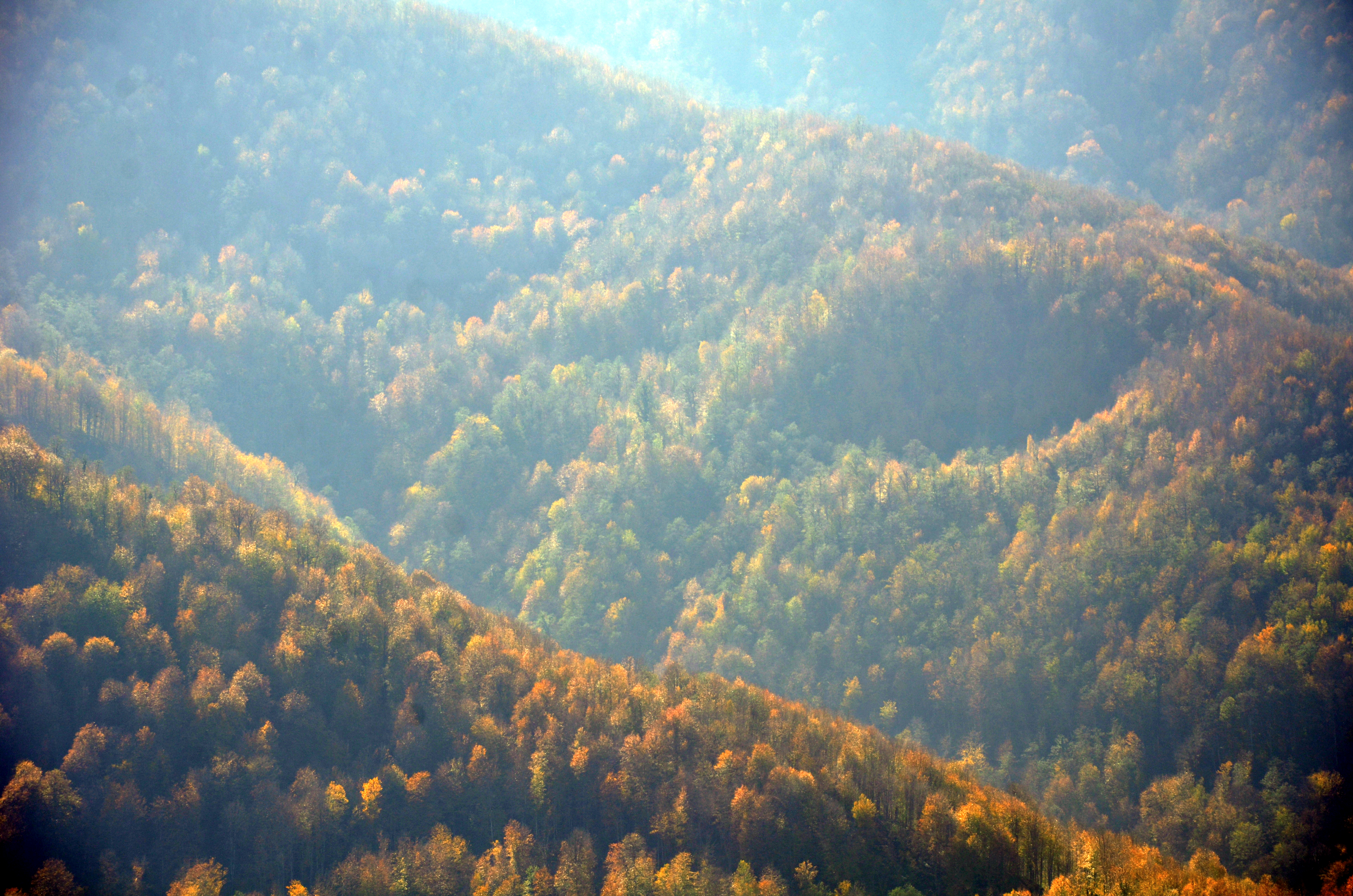

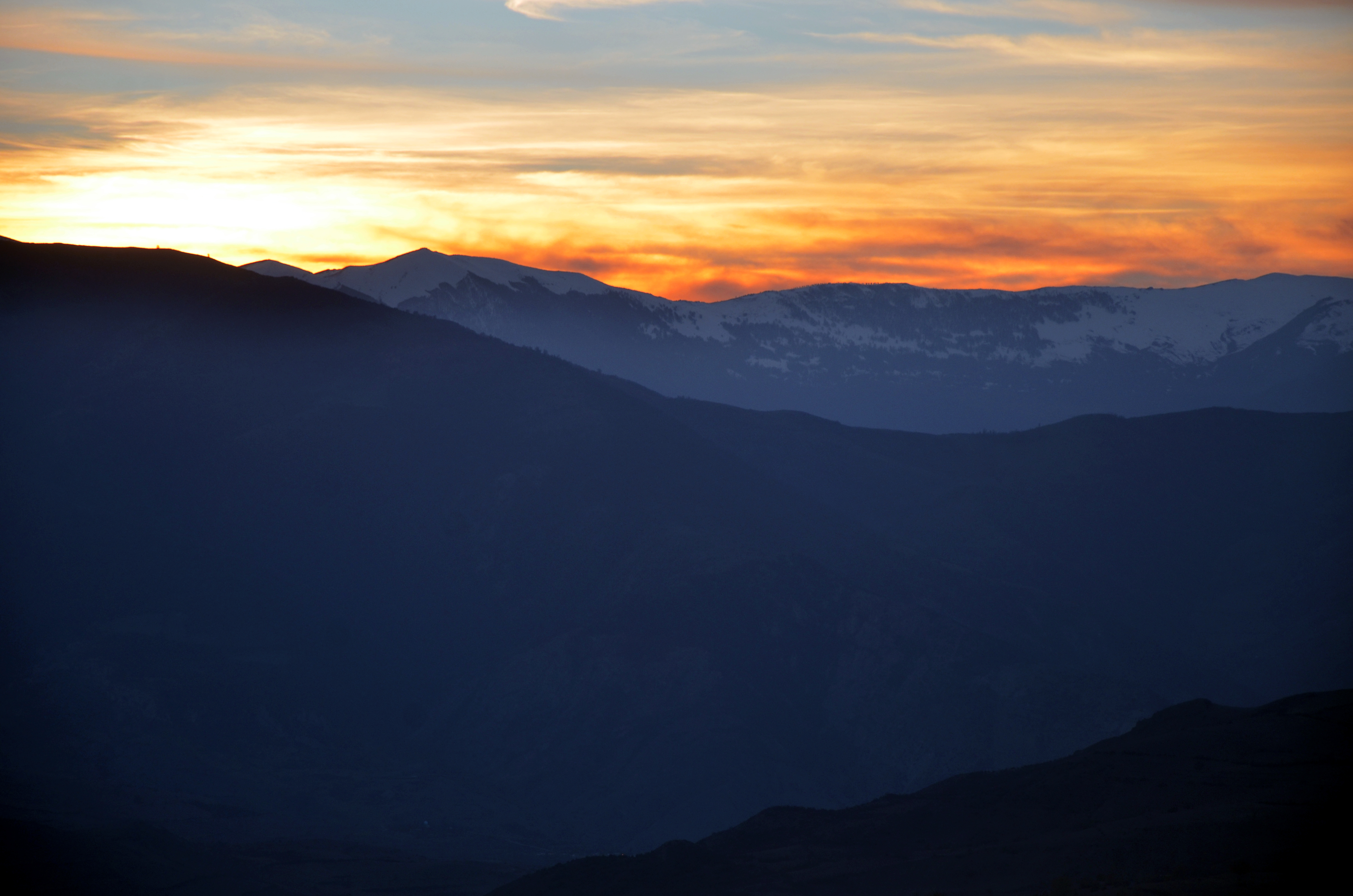

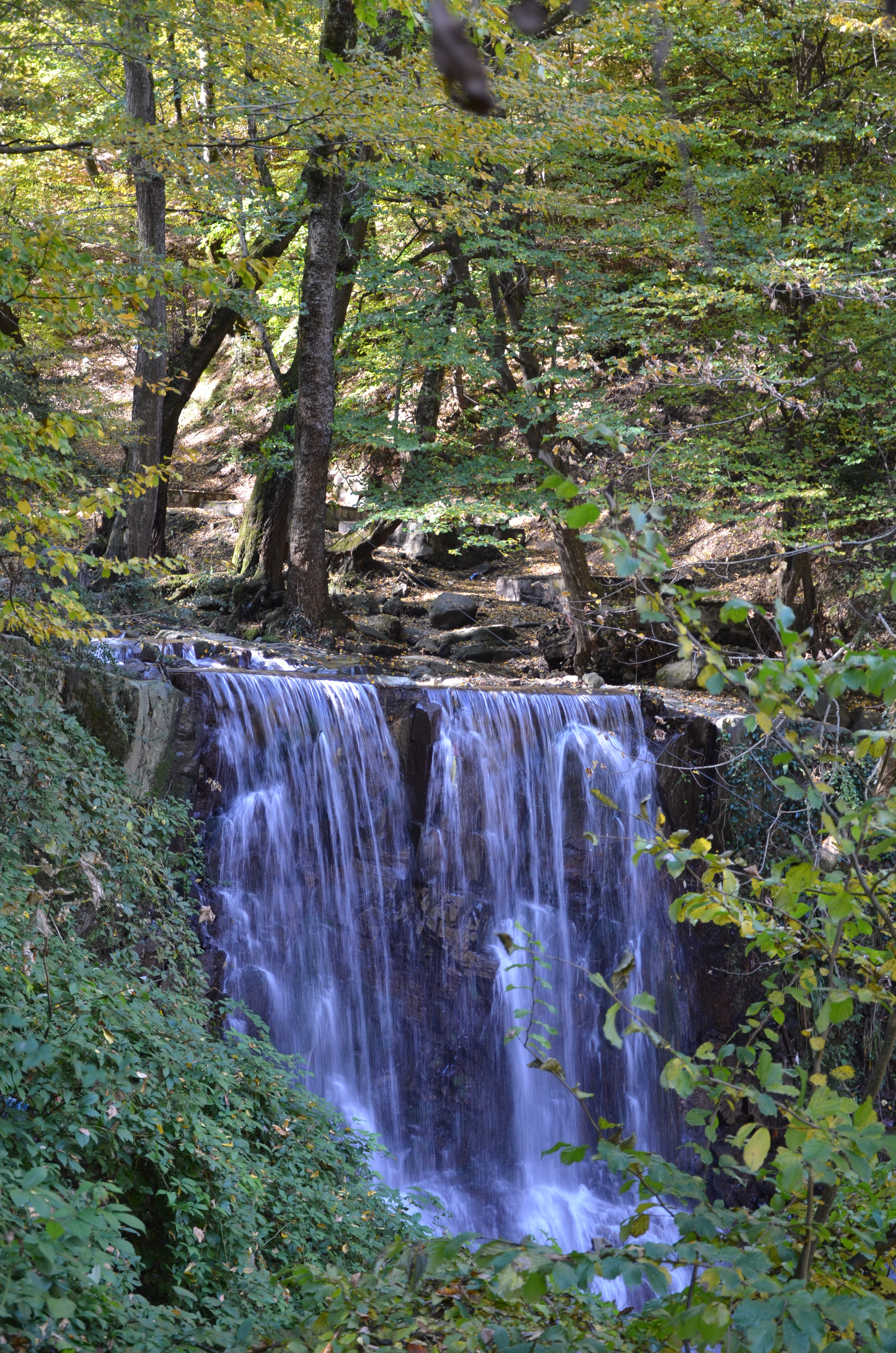

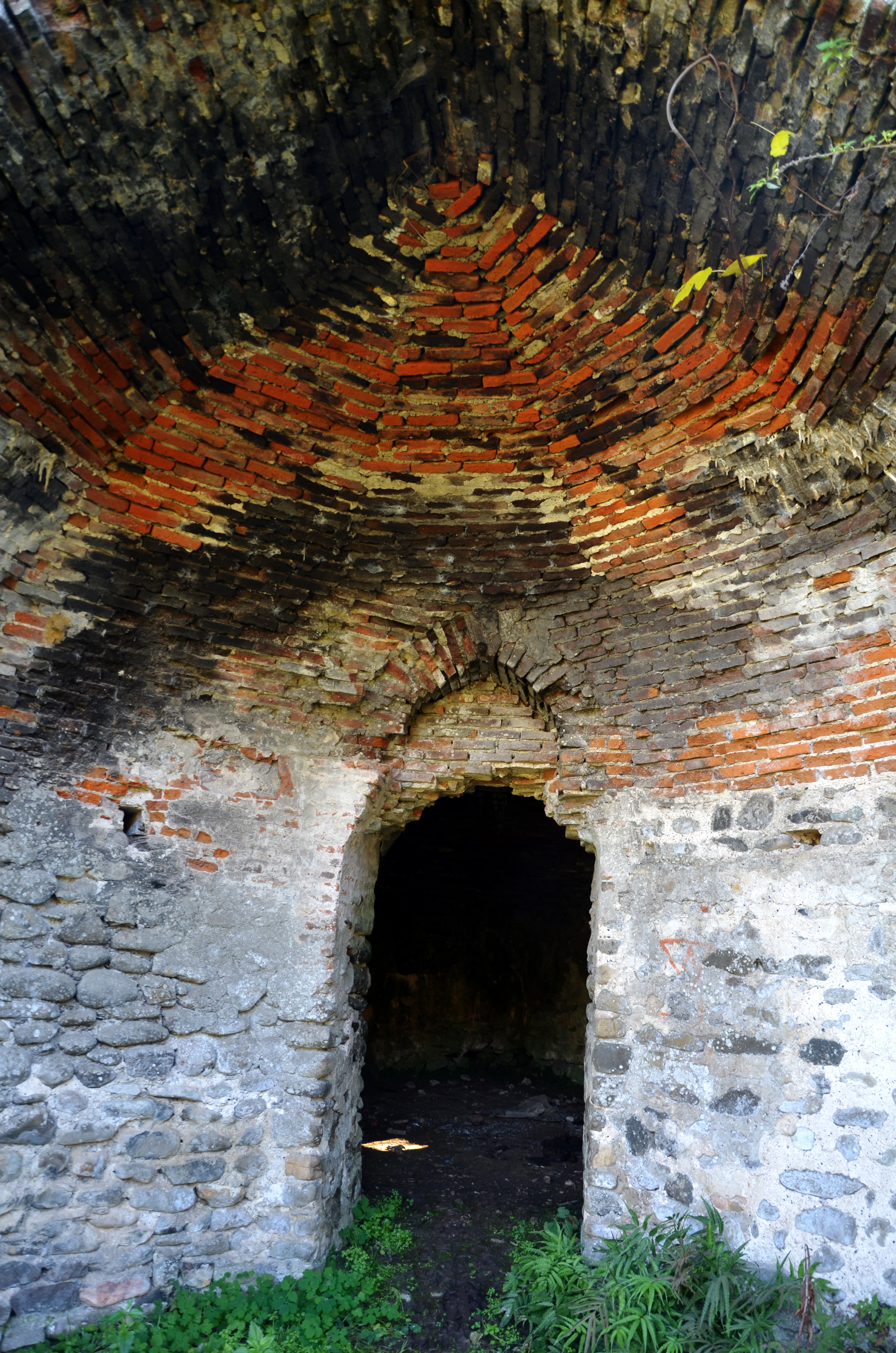

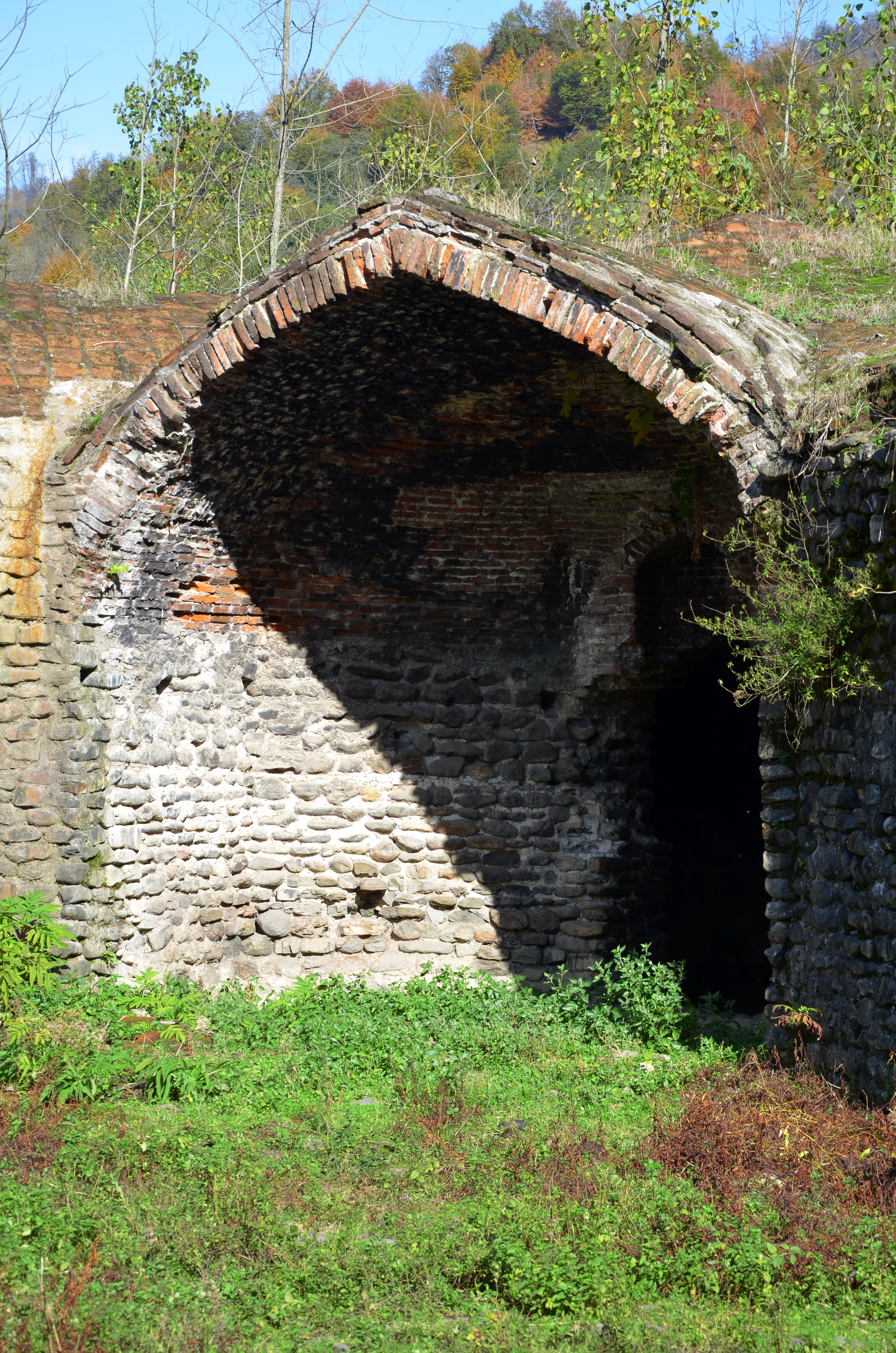

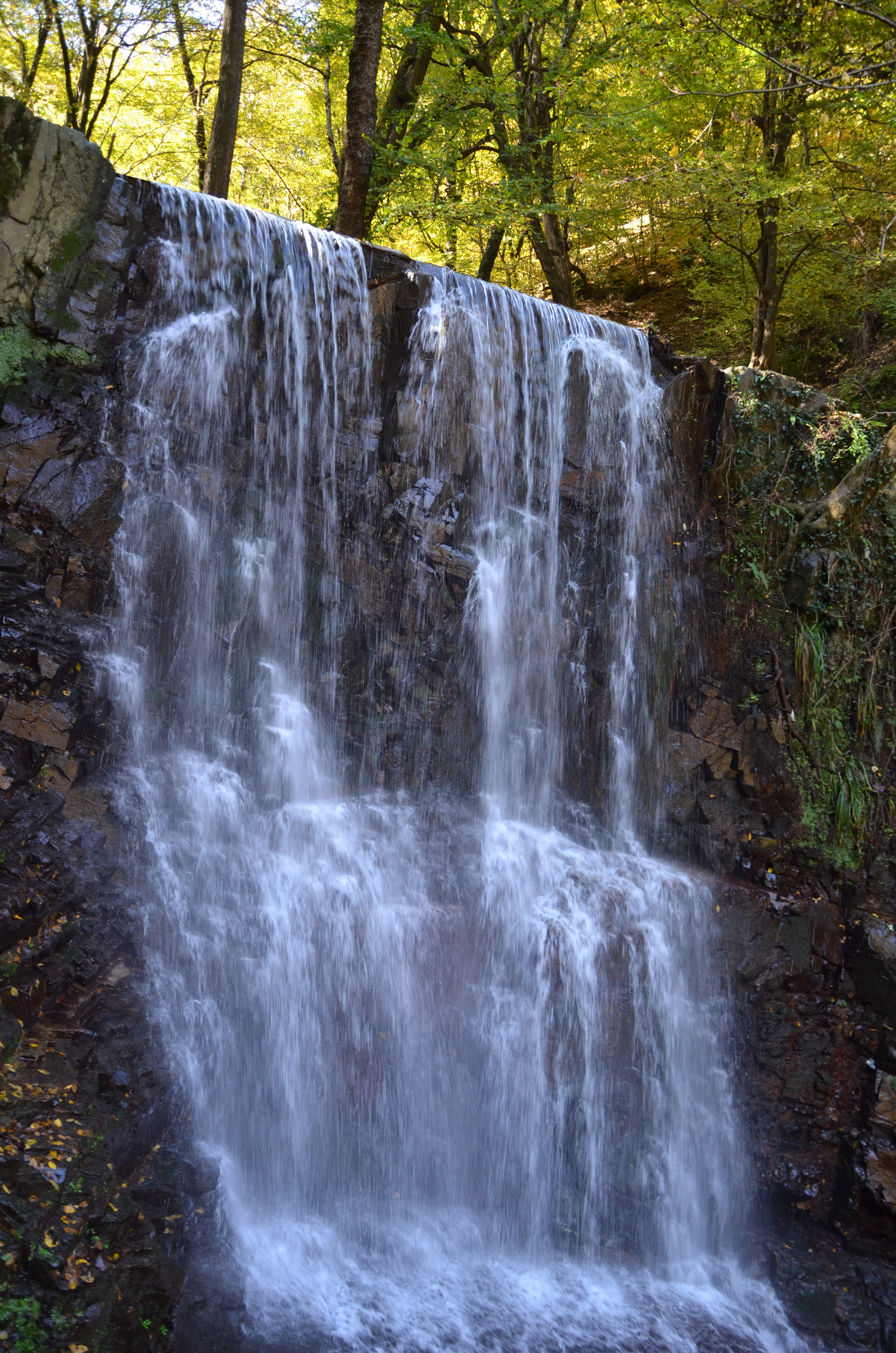

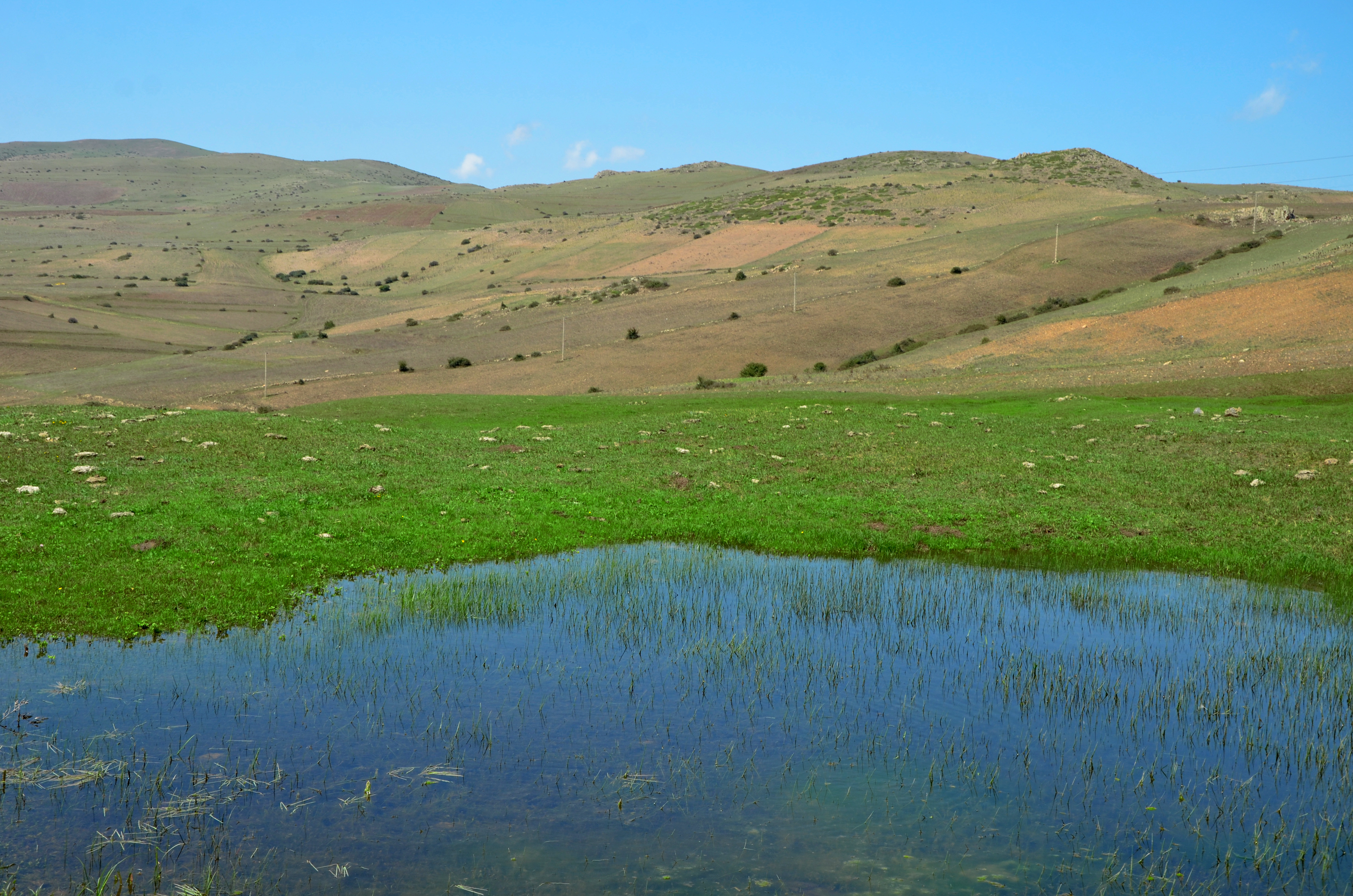

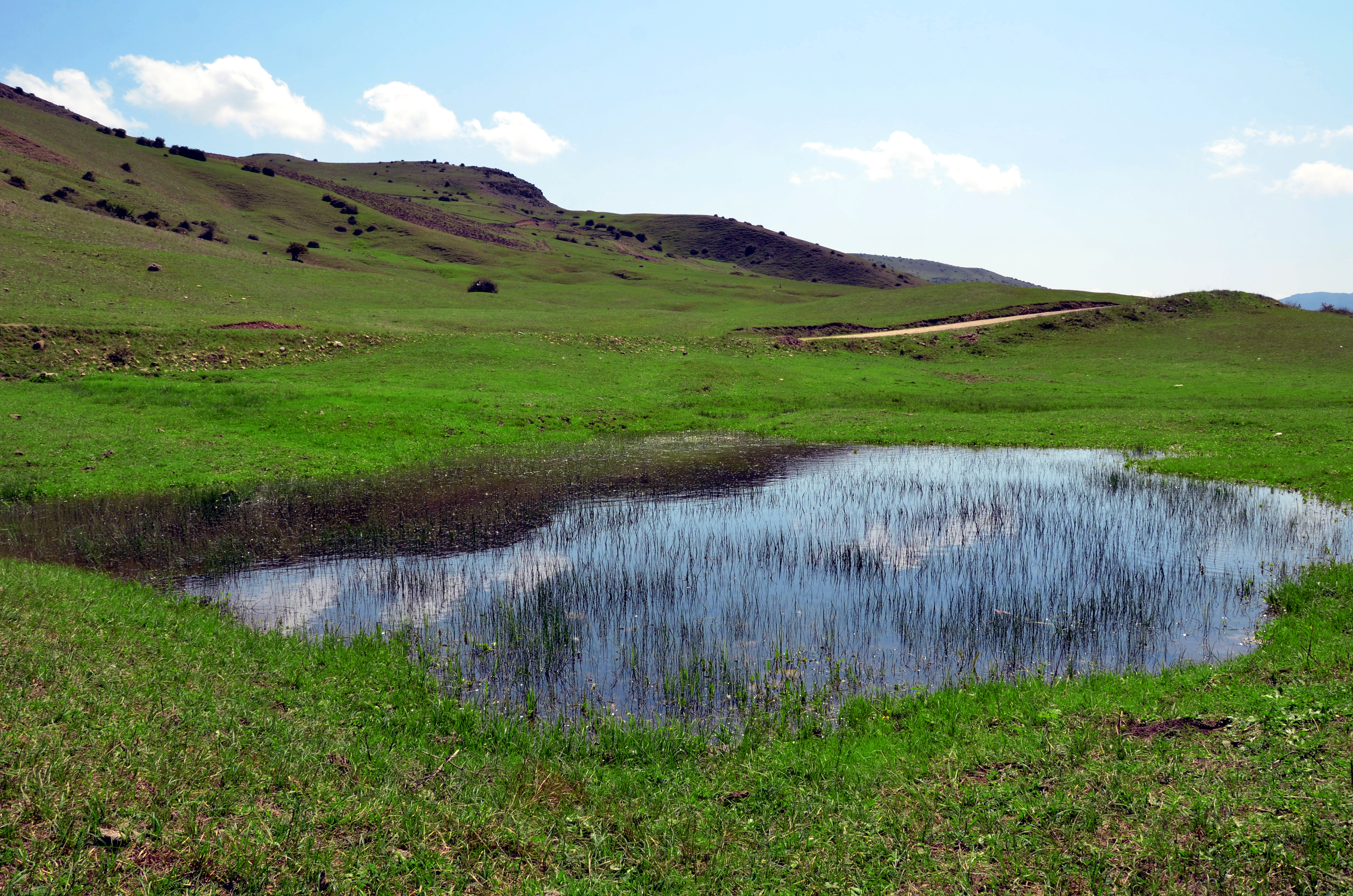
