= 1921 in Iran =

- Decades
- See also: Other events of 1921; Years in Iran

The following lists events that happened during 1921 in Qajar era.

== Incumbents ==
- Monarch: Ahmad Shah Qajar
- Prime Minister: Fathollah Khan Akbar (until February 22), Zia ol Din Tabatabaee (February 24 – June 4), Ahmad Qavam (starting June 4)

== Events ==
- 1921 Persian legislative election.
- Battle of Miandoab.

== Births ==
- January 1 – Hossein Wahid Khorasani, Iranian Grand Ayatollah.
- February 4 – Lotfi A. Zadeh, American electrical engineer and computer scientist.
- February 21 – Arman (actor), Iranian actor and film director.
- February 25 – Farrokh Ghaffari, Film director, screenwriter and actor.
- February 25 – Mariam Behnam, Iranian-Emirati writer and activist.
- February 26 – Shapoor Reporter, British spy.
- March 1 – Hemin Mukriyani, Kurdish poet and scholar.
- March 21 – Shaban Jafari, Iranian politician.
- April 28 – Simin Daneshvar, Iranian writer.
- April 29 – Adib Taherzadeh, prominent Iranian Baha'i.
- May 22 – Jalil Shahnaz, Persian classical musician.
- June 4 – Nasser Yeganeh, Iranian politician.
- June 24 – Nasser Moghaddam, Last chief of the SAVAK.
- June 25 – Hossein Ali Mallah, Iranian musician, painter, author.
- July 4 – Nasser Sharifi, Iranian sports shooter.
- July 28 – Sigrid Lotfi, German-born Iranian translator.
- November 1 – Mohammad Ezodin Hosseini Zanjani, Iranian grand ayatollah.
- November 29 – Hesen Zîrek, Iranian Kurdish songwriter-singer.
- December 6 – Mostafa Mokri, Footballer.
- December 23 – Sattareh Farmanfarmaian, Nobility, pioneering social worker, author.
- ? – Abbas Sahab, Iranian cartographer & geographer.
- ? – Abolfazl Qassemi, Iranian politician.
- ? – Ahmad Samii Gilani, Iranian writer and translator.
- ? – Ali Hojjat Kashani, Iranian military leader.
- ? – Alireza Danesh Sokhanvar, shia missionary and social movement leader.
- ? – Fawzia of Egypt, queen consort of Iran from 1941 to 1948.
- ? – Jahangir Tafazzoli, Iranian journalist and politician.
- ? – Jaleh Esfahani, Iranian poet.
- ? – Khosrow Qashqai, Iranian politician.
- ? – Mahvash, Iranian singer, dancer, movie actress and stage performer in the 1950s and 1960s.
- ? – Mansour Rouhani, Iranian politician.
- ? – Mehdi Rahimi, Iranian general.
- ? – Mohammad Bahmanbeigi, Iranian writer and founder of education for nomadic communities in Iran.
- ? – Mohammad Mokri, Iranian scholar and writer.
- ? – Morteza Keyvan, Iranian politician.
- ? – Naser Kamalian, Iranian pathologist.
- ? – Pervez Amini Afshar, Iranian military leader.
- ? – Rahmatollah Moghaddam Maraghei, Persian politician.
- ? – Shokouh Riazi, Iranian painter.
- ? – Taher Ahmadzadeh, Iranian politician.

== Deaths ==
- November 28 – ʻAbdu'l-Bahá, son of Bahá'u'lláh and leader of the Bahá'í Faith.
- December 2 – Mirza Kuchik Khan, Iranian revolutionary.
- ? – Bibi Khanoom Astarabadi, Iranian writer, satirist, and one of the pioneering figures in the women's movement of Iran..
- ? – Haydar Khan Amo-oghli, Iranian revolutionary.
- ? – Mohammad Taqi Pessian, Iranian politician.
