= Puri Soltani =

Iranian librarian

- پوری سلطانی
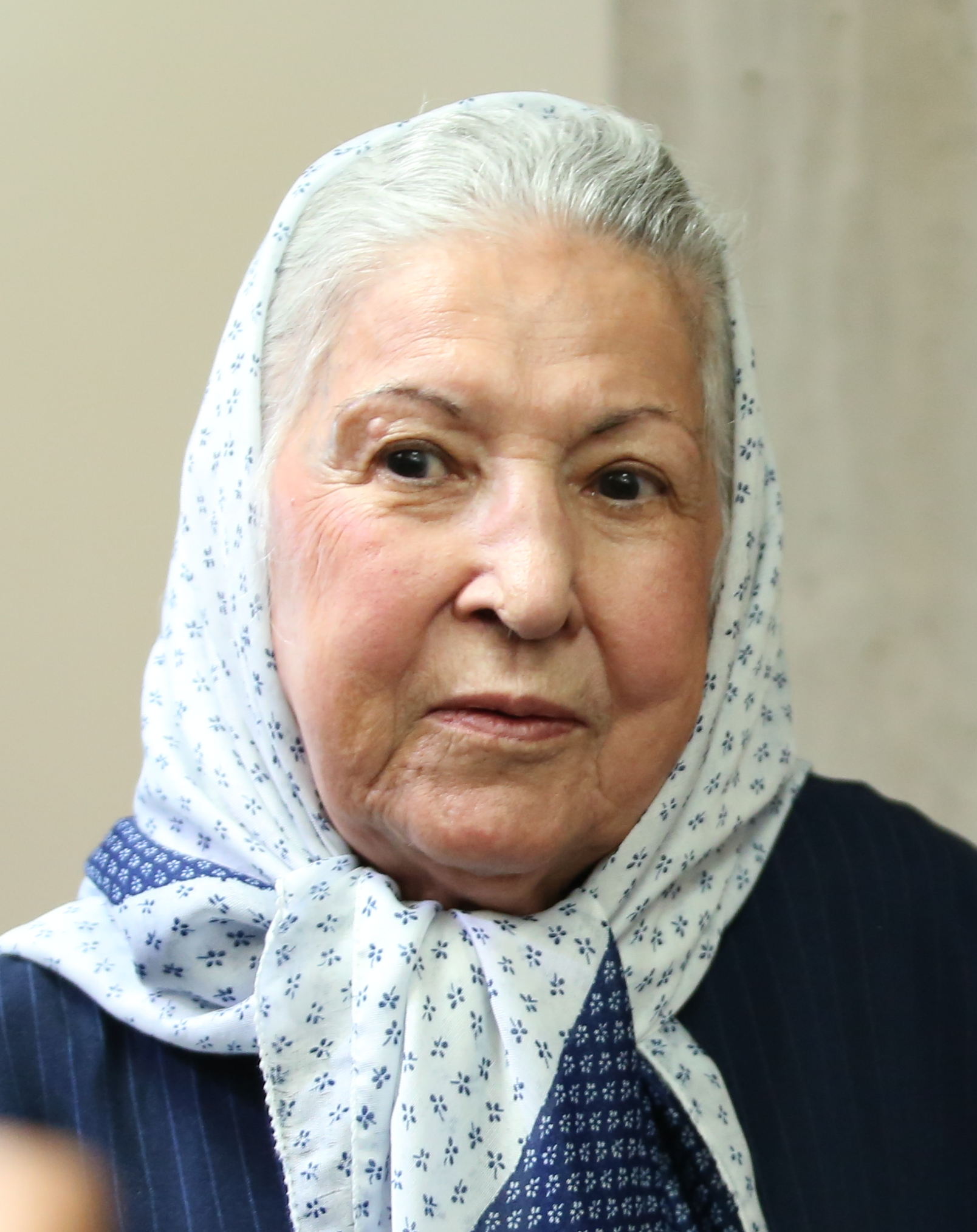
- Puri Soltani in 2012
- Born: 22 September 1931; Hamadan, Imperial State of Iran
- Died: 7 November 2015 (aged 84); Tehran, Iran
- Spouse: Morteza Keyvan
- Parent(s): Mehdi Soltani Shirazi (father); Roqayeh Khanom (mother)

Puri Soltani (Persian: پوری سلطانی; 22 September 1931 – 7 November 2015) was an academic who was a "pioneer of Iranian librarianship".

== Life ==
Pouri Soltani was born in Hamadan, the daughter of Mehdi Soltani Shirazi and Roqayeh Khanom, on 22 September 1931. Roqayeh Khanom was Mehdi Soltani Shirazi's eldest daughter. A prominent constitutional lawyer, her father was a follower of Rahmat Ali Shah (Sheikh Abdullah Ha’iri) and moved from Shiraz to Tehran to be closer to him before taking his daughter as his wife and having seven children.

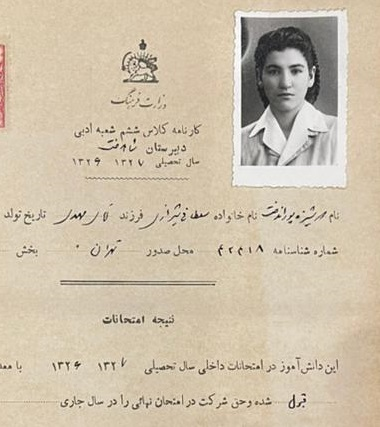
Puri Soltani's highschool report card

Puri Soltani obtained a bachelor’s degree in Persian literature from the Faculty of Literature at the University of Tehran and was employed by the Ministry of Culture (current Ministry of Education). Pouri met Morteza Keyvan, a poet, literary critic and newspaper editor, at a wedding ceremony and they were married on 17 June 1954. Three months after their marriage, they were both arrested and charged with membership in the Communist Tudeh Party, declared illegal after the 1953 coup d'état that overthrew the democratically elected Prime Minister Mohammad Mosaddegh. Her husband was executed three months after their wedding, prompting Soltani to leave Iran for several years.

After returning to Iran, Soltani founded multiple library organizations, expanded the library system of the University of Tehran, and oversaw the digitization of Iranian national documents. She played a crucial role in setting up the Center for Scientific Papers and the Center for Library Services at the Ministry of Education and Sciences. These two centers were opened in 1968 and played a crucial role in modernizing Iranian libraries, especially university and research libraries. Pouri did not accept the presidency of the Center for Library Services and, instead, agreed to manage its research center.

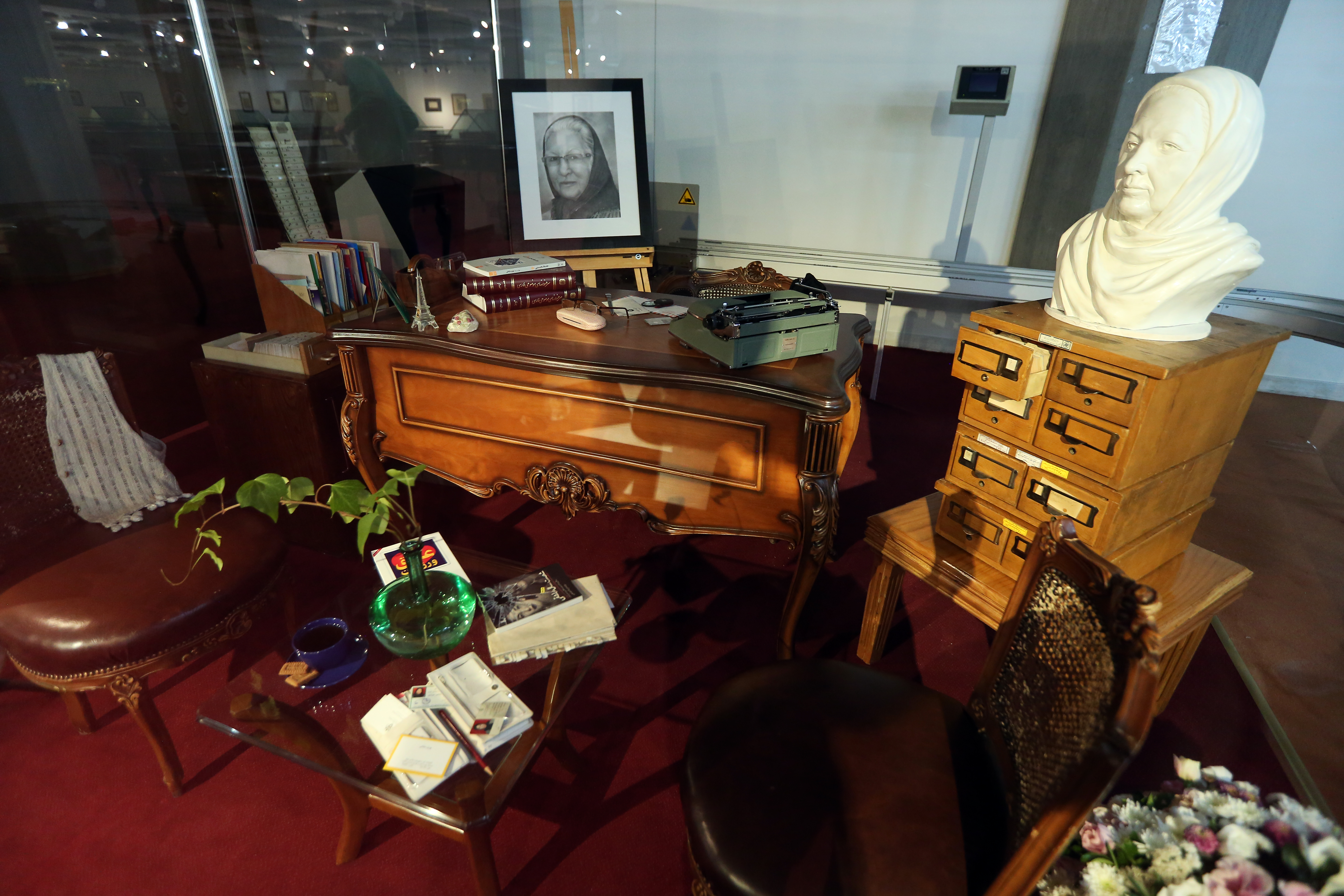
Relics of Puri Soltani at the Book and Documentary Heritage Museum of Iran

Soltani is credited with modernizing libraries and information science in Iran. She died in Tehran on 7 November 2015.

== See also ==
- List of libraries in Iran
