= Book and Documentary Heritage Museum of Iran =

Art history museum in Tehran, Iran

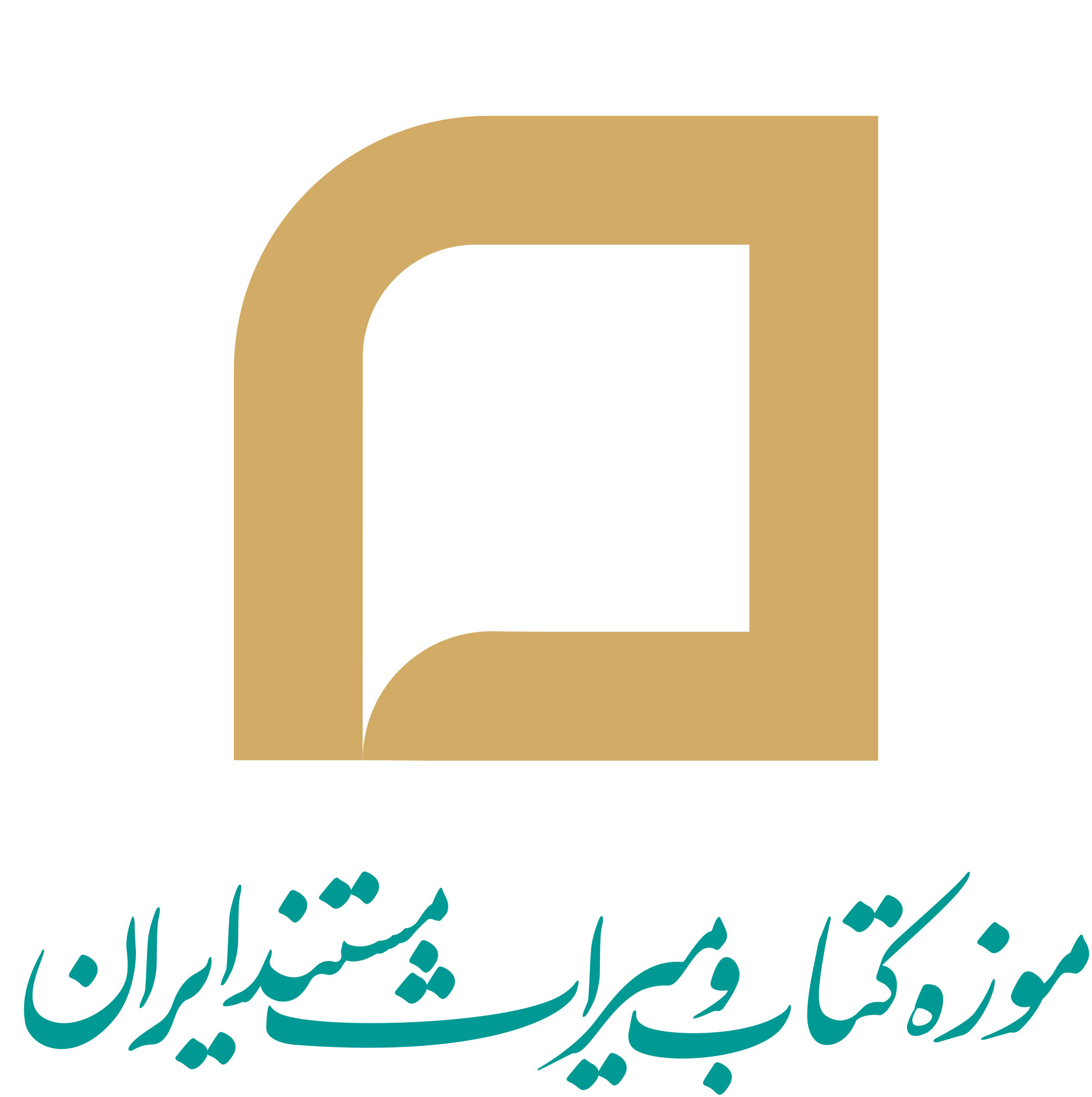

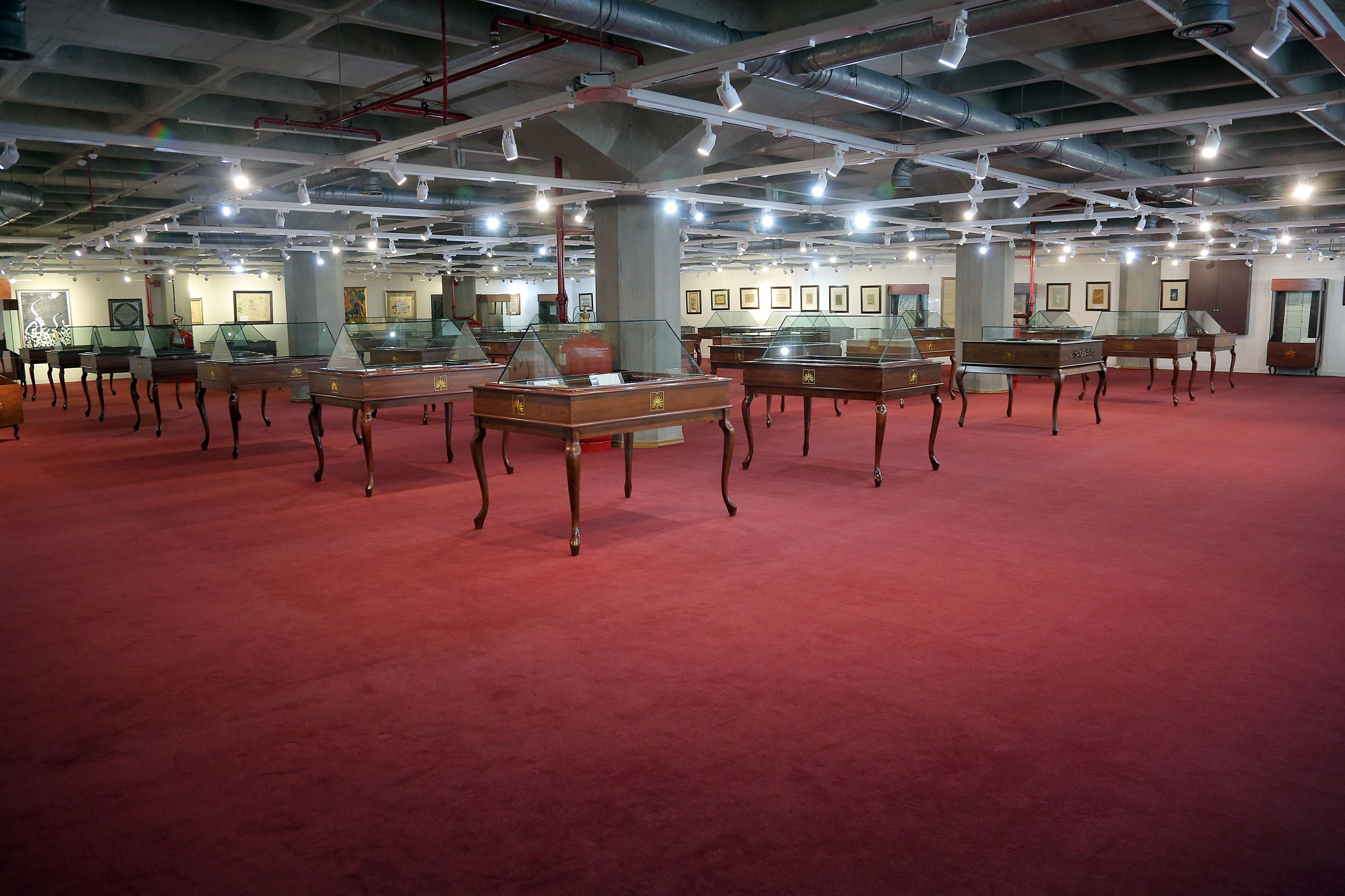
- Location: National Library and Archives of Iran, Tehran, Iran

The Book and Documentary Heritage Museum of Iran (Persian: موزه کتاب و میراث مستند ایران), is an artistic historical museum based on the display of paper works, is one of the sections of the National Library and Archives of Iran. In this museum, a selection of historical works including books and non-books materials, documents, manuscripts, calligraphic tableaux and painting, periodicals, rare and exquisite printed books and works related to celebrities are exhibited.

== History ==
Located on Haqqani Highway in Tehran, the museum was inaugurated in February 2016. Earlier, the works of the National Library and Archives were exhibited independently in various halls. When Seyyed Reza Salehi Amiri was in charge of the library, a decision was made to change the use of one of the repositories to focus on the display of works and the official opening of a museum for the National Library and Archives of Iran. The purpose of its foundation was to promote the culture of society and spread Iranian-Islamic culture.

== Sections ==
The Book and Documentary Heritage Museum of Iran includes two main sections:

- Exhibition Hall: In this hall, the works for the public are in the form of seasonal and thematic exhibitions.
- Assembly Hall: This hall is for holding cultural and artistic events, film screenings, workshops, meetings and conferences.

== Bust of Hakim Abul-qasem Ferdowsi Tusi ==
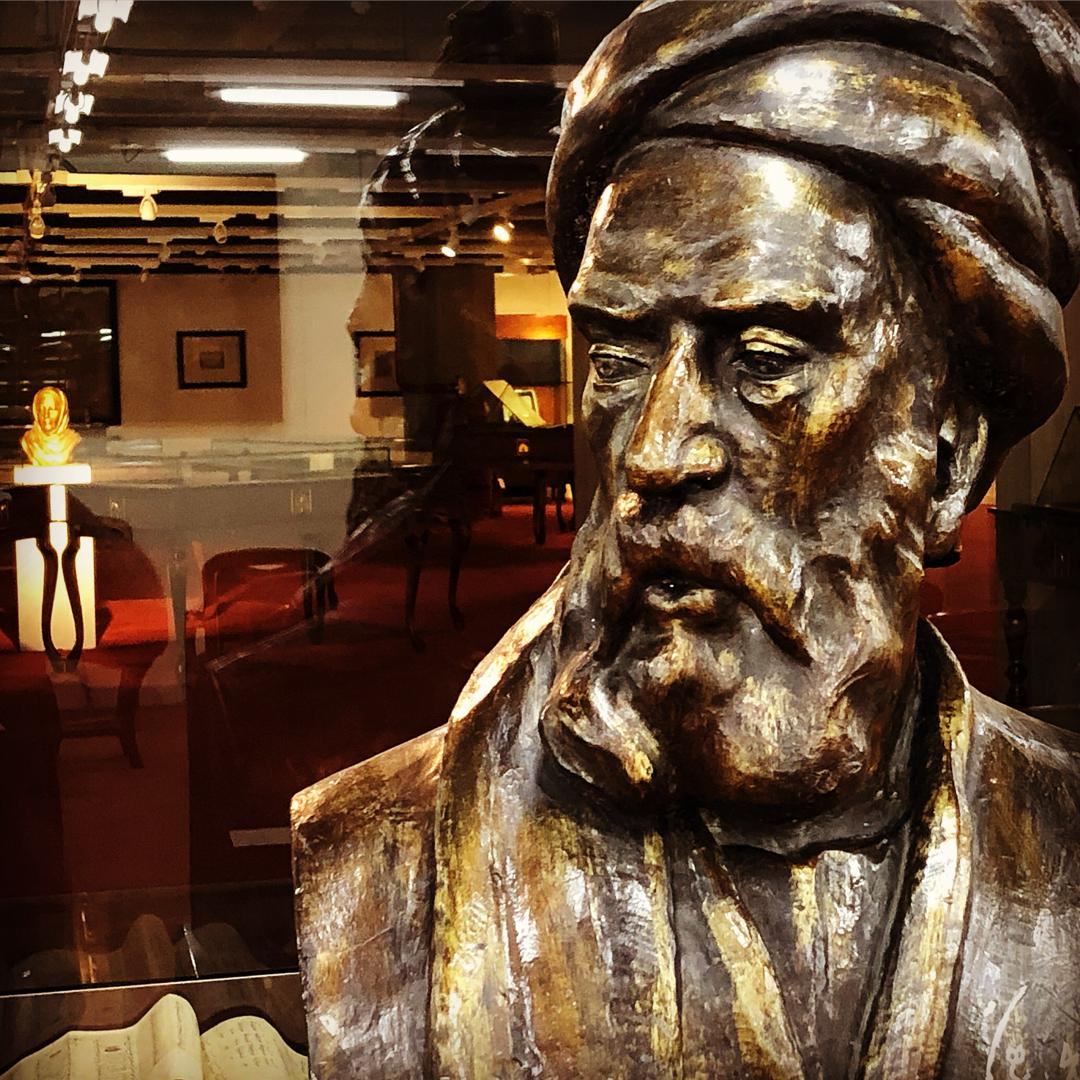
Bust of Hakim Abol-qasem Ferdowsi

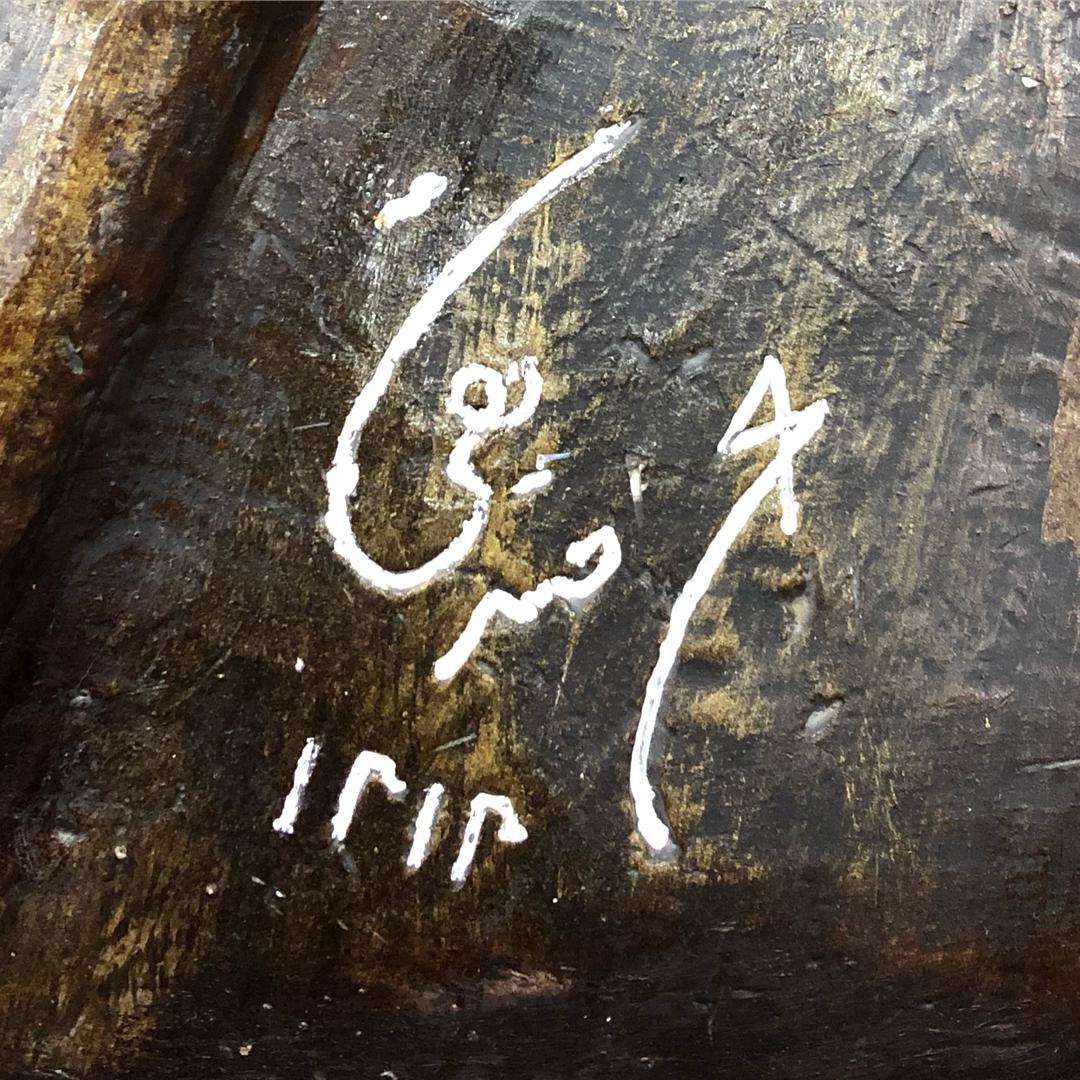
Signature of Abolhassan Sadighi on the bust of Hakim Abol-qasem Ferdowsi

The Book and Documentary Heritage Museum of the National Library and Archives of Iran holds a bust of Abul-qasem Ferdowsi which was registered under number 1448 in the Iran National Heritage List on February 25, 2020, by the Ministry of Cultural Heritage, Handicrafts and Tourism. This work was created in the solar year 1313 (1934) by Abolhassan Sadighi and then installed in the foyer of the National Library of Iran, located on 30 Tir Street. The bust is currently being held and is on display at the Book and Documentary Heritage Museum at the new address of the National Library. The dimension of this bust is 50×26 with a height of 70 cm and its main material is made of gypsum. At the bottom, there is the master's signature and the manufacture date.

== Memorial of Professors ==
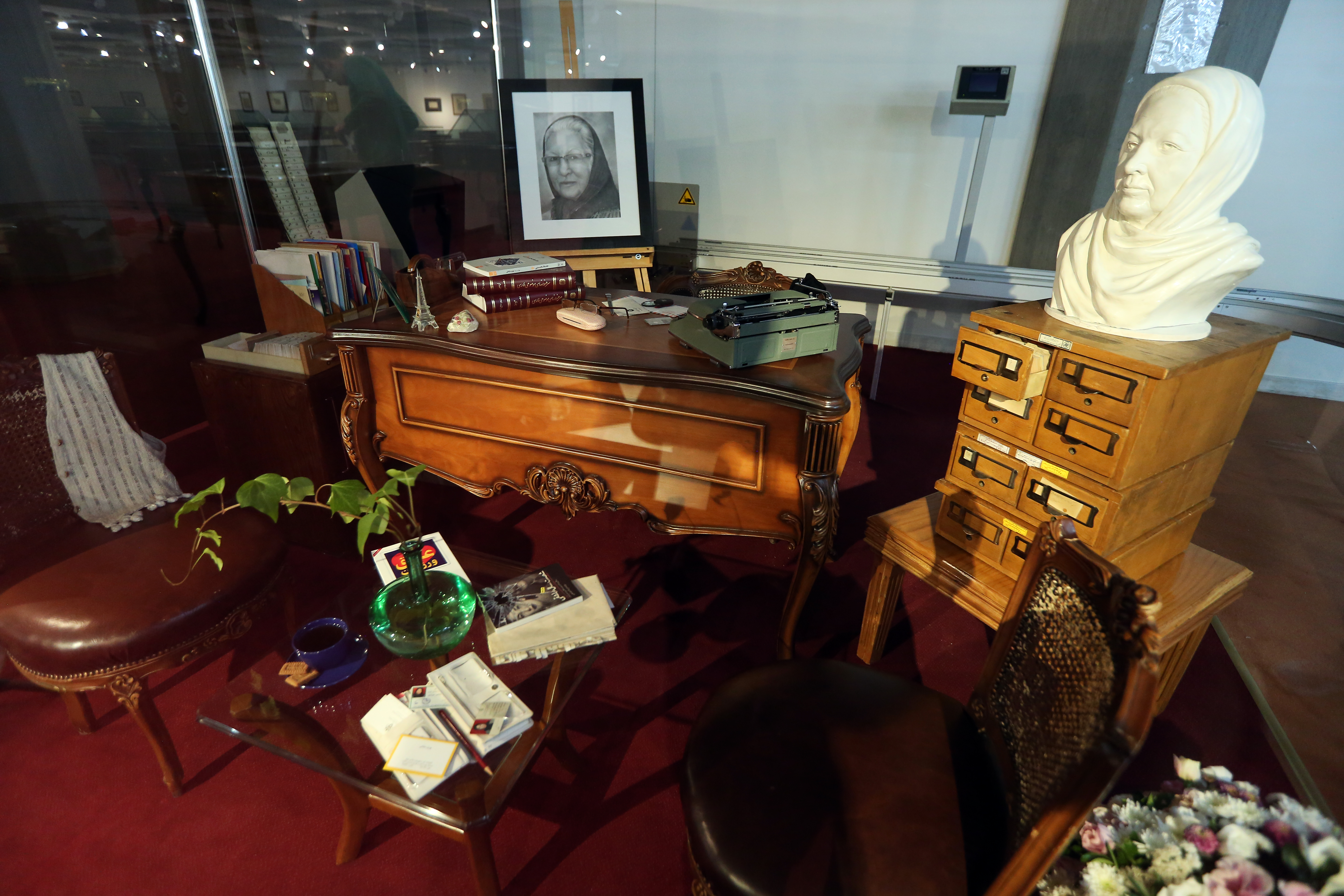
Relics of Puri Soltani

The museum preserves and displays the relics of Mohammad Ali Jamalzadeh, Iraj Afshar, Mohaddes Armavi, Mahmoud Hesabi, Jalal Al-e-Ahmad and others. The relics and office of Puri Soltani were unveiled in November 2018 in honor of her efforts.

== Nowruz Stamp ==
At the end of the solar year 1397 (2019), a mutual collaboration started between the Book and Documentary Heritage Museum and the Museum of Posts and Communications. The result was the design of the Nowruz 2019 stamp, using a drawing of one of the manuscripts of Hafez Shirazi Divan, dated 878 AH and belonging to the National Library of Iran. This miniature, which shows celebration of man's love for Mother Nature, especially in spring, complies with a sonnet by Hafez: "Happy came the rose; and more happy than that aught ..." The stamp, dated 13 March 2019, in the number of seventy thousand rounds, is published as the 55th stamp marking the celebration of Nowruz.

== Exhibitions ==
In this museum, a number of cultural events have taken place:

- Exhibition of Persian Manuscripts at the university of Bratislava, Slovakia
- Algerian Cultural Week
- Exhibition on the History of One Hundred and Ten Years of the Persian Constitutional Revolution
- Ethnic and National Identity Exhibition
- Shahnameh Classic Work Exhibition in the Qajar Era
- Exhibition of the Documentary Heritage on Iranian National Cinema (in honor of Ezatollah Entezami)
- Exhibition on School Memoirs of the 1970s and 1980s
- Exhibition of Top Works of Calligraphers from the Qajar Era
- Exhibition on the Caricature Works of Kambiz Derambakhsh
- Exhibition on the Local History of Isfahan with the introduction of the documentary heritage of Takht-e Foulad Cultural Complex
- Exhibition of "Dagger in the Back of History" on the occasion of anniversary of the death of Amir Kabir
- Exhibition on Gilded Works of Contemporary Artists
- Exhibition of 1979 Revolution marking stamps collection displayed on the occasion of the 40th anniversary of the victory of the Islamic Revolution, with cooperation of the Post Museum of Iran and revolutionary publications
- Exhibition of Allameh Helli's Manuscripts
- Exhibition of Nowruz 1398 (2019) displaying 55 terms of New Year stamps and a number of historical travelogues
- Exhibition of "Hamedan the Inheritor of History marking documentary heritage of Hamedan Province
- Exhibition of Local History of Mazandaran Province
- Exhibition of Local History of Gilan Province entitled Gilan, the Bluish-Green Territory of Iran
- Calligraphy Exhibition of Azim Fallah students
- Exhibition of Local History of Yazd Province
- Exhibition of Italian Tourists Evening in Iran from the Bukhara Magazine's Evening Sessions in collaboration with "Bukhara Journal"
- Fars province Local History Exhibition
- Exhibition of French Tourists Evening in Iran from the Bukhara Magazine's Evening Sessions in collaboration with "Bukhara Journal"
- Bright Night Exhibition on the birthday of the Persian writer Jalal Al-e-Ahmad in collaboration with Bukhara Magazine
- Exhibition of Local History of Khorasan entitled "Khorasan, the Land of the Sun"
- Exhibition and Unveiling of Unseen Photographs from the Qajar Era being kept in the National Archives of Iran in collaboration with the "House of Albums" of the Cultural and World Heritage Complex of Golestan Palace on the occasion of the World Day for Audiovisual Heritage
- Women's Day Exhibition, about the marriage certificates of Qajar Era celebrities

== Oldest works ==
The oldest manuscript in the museum

=== Manuscript ===
The oldest manuscript of the National Library and Archives of Iran is a collection of treatises dated 420 AH written in ancient manuscript on Baghdadi creamy paper. This work includes treatises such as: The Amazing Rulings and Judgments of Amir al-Moemenin, the first Shia Imam and Commander of the Faithful; Javidan Kherad (Book of Eternal Wisdom) by Abu Ali al-Muskawiyyah on Practical Wisdom and Advice; Al-Adab al-Saghir by Ibn al-Muqaffa on ethics; Kitman Al-Ser va Hefz Al-Lesan (Keep a secret and keep your mouth) by Abū ʿUthman ʿAmr ibn Baḥr al-Kinānī al-Baṣrī commonly known as al-Jāḥiẓ on ethics; and Zikr Al-Khalaefva Onwan Al-Maaref by Sahib ibn Abbad on the life story of the Prophet of Islam and the Rashedin Caliphs.

=== Document ===
The oldest historical document in the National Library and Archives of Iran is a decree of Sultan Abu Sa'id Bahadur Khan Ilkhani. The text of the document is written in the Taliq script used for court documents of the Ilkhanid period, in which a decree of Sultan Abu Saeed appears. This decree was issued in the Kouhak region of Fars in the first quarter of 726 AH.

== Top historic and artistic works ==
Some works displayed in this museum are as follows:

- The Qur'an Manuscript in the handwriting of Zinal al-Abedin Qazvini dated 1219 AH (the period of Fath-Ali Shah Qajar) in Shiraz and all pages gilded and known as "the most exquisite Qur'an in the Islamic world"
- Amendment of the Constitution on the letterhead of the National Consultative Assembly dated 1325 AH with the signature and autograph of Mohammad Ali Shah Qajar
- Manuscript of Complete Works of Saadi handwritten by Ali ibn Ahmad Shirazi dated 784 AH (registered in the UNESCO's Memory of the World Programme)
- Leaves from the Qur’an manuscript attributed to Baysunghur Mirza, the Timurid prince, dated AH 837 (1433/1434 CE)
- Qur’an manuscript in hand calligraphy by Mohammad Shafiq, (known as Mirza Kouchak; pen name, Vesāl Shirazi), dated AH 1259 (1843/1844 CE). Religious calligraphy work on Damascene paper (Note: Damascene paper, also called Charta Damascena was a type of rag paper, mostly made from flax linen, widely used in the Islamic world. Damascus was an important centre for its production, which gave it the name, Damascene.) with lacquered cover, in the style of the Vesāl family book tradition
- "Adviye Mofrade" Manuscript compiled by Abubakr Hamed ibn Samajun Andalusi dated 7th century AH
- "Sharh al-Isharatwa al-Tanbihat" Manuscript in Khajeh Nasir al-Din al-Tusi handwriting dated 672 AH
- the manuscript collection of various notes, in the handwriting of Mulla Sadra and Mirdamad dated 1050 AH
- Sahifa Sajjadieh Manuscript handwritten by Ahmad Nairizi dated 1121 AH
- The Muraqqa "Salavatieh" by Khajeh Nasir al-Din Tusi calligraphy handwriting by Mahmud ibn Muhammad Hassan on 1064 AH
- The book The Canon of Medicine (Al-Qanun fi al-Tib) by Ibn Sina, published in 1553 AD in Rome
- Golestan, Saadi's book in German, translated by Adam Olearius, published in 1654 AD
- Jihadiyah Treatise written by Mirza Issa Ghaem Magham Farahani published in 1233 AH as a Movable type printing (lead printing) book in Persian supported by prince Abbas Mirza in Tabriz
- "Vaqaye Etefaqiyeh Newspaper" with MirzaTaghikhan Amir Kabir as the license holder, started publication in lithography in 1267 AH
- "Shokoofeh Newspaper" managed by Maryam Amid Semnani; Director of "Mozayanieh School" in Tehran, as one of the newspapers for women, which was published from 1913 to 1919.

== Gallery ==
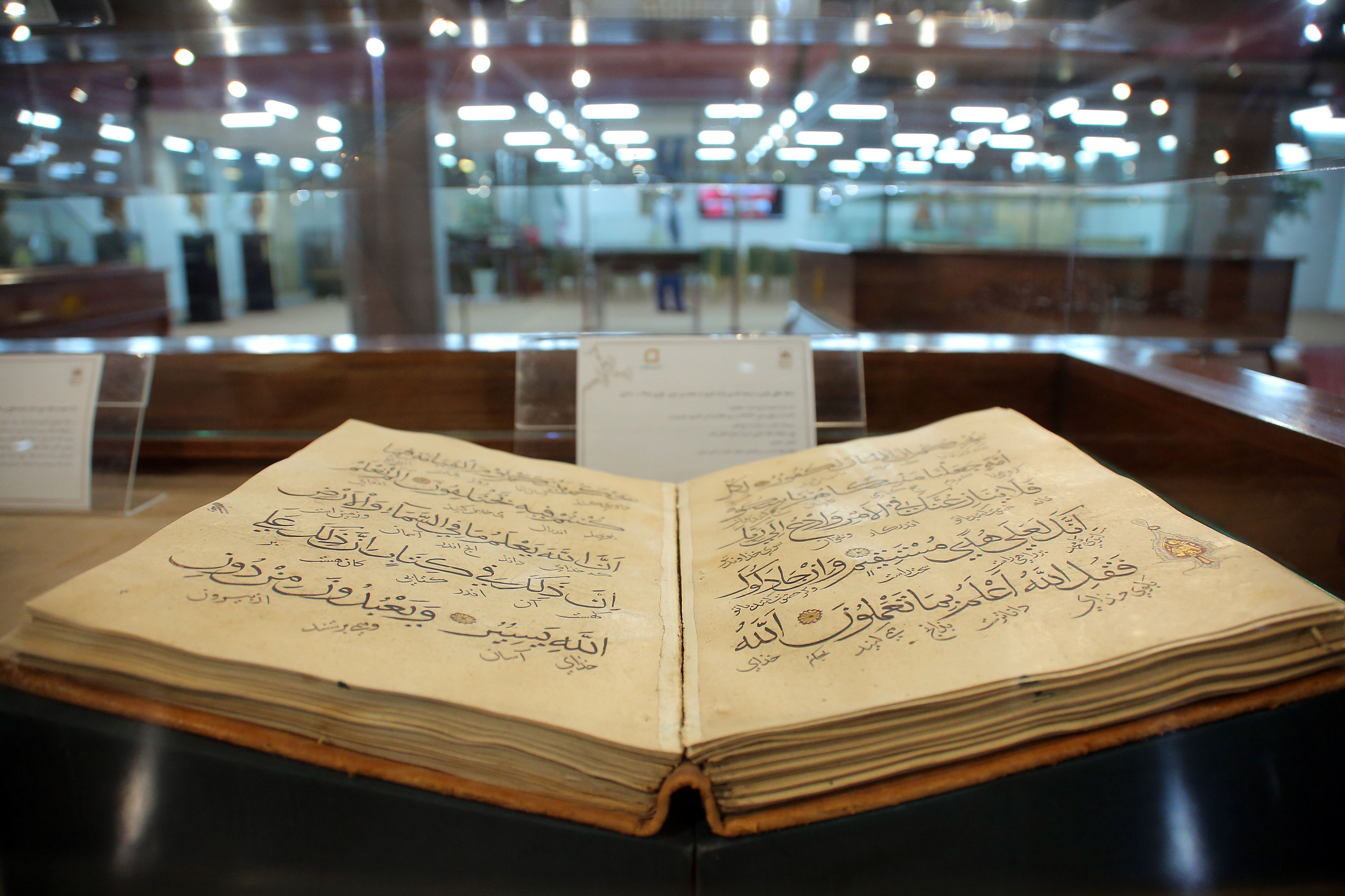
Manuscript of the Qur'an

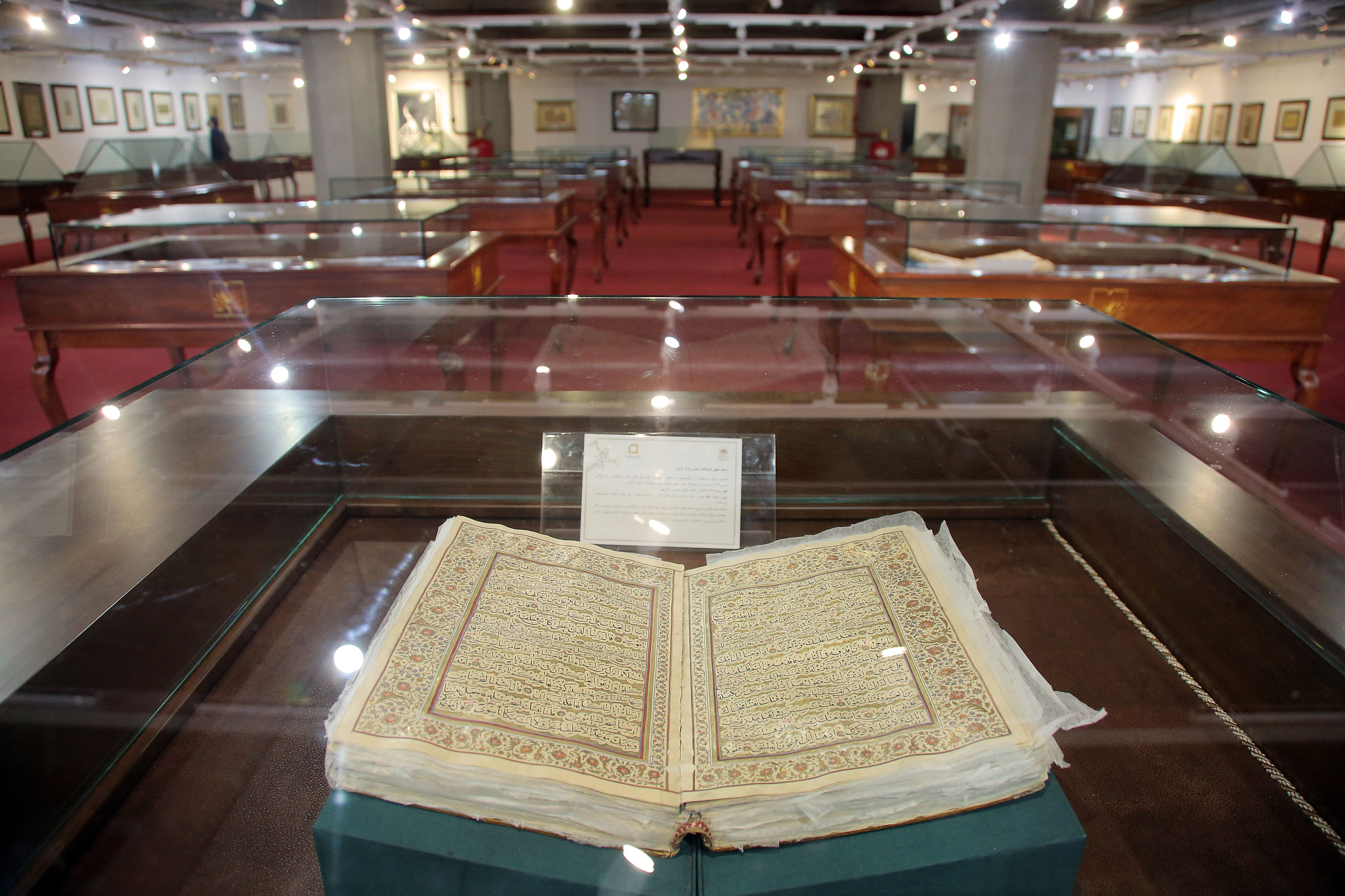
The Qur'an of Zayn al-Abdin Qazvini

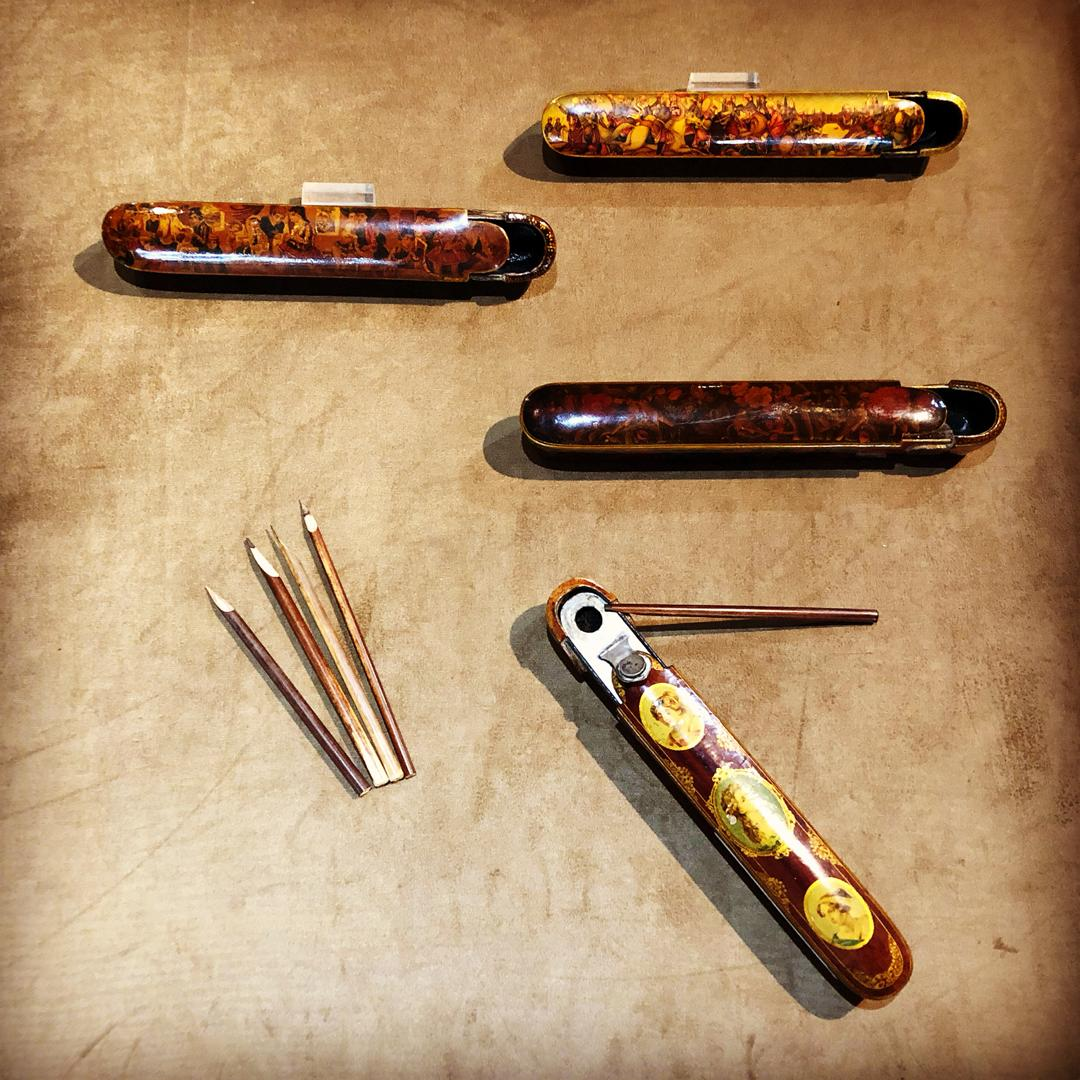
pencil cases

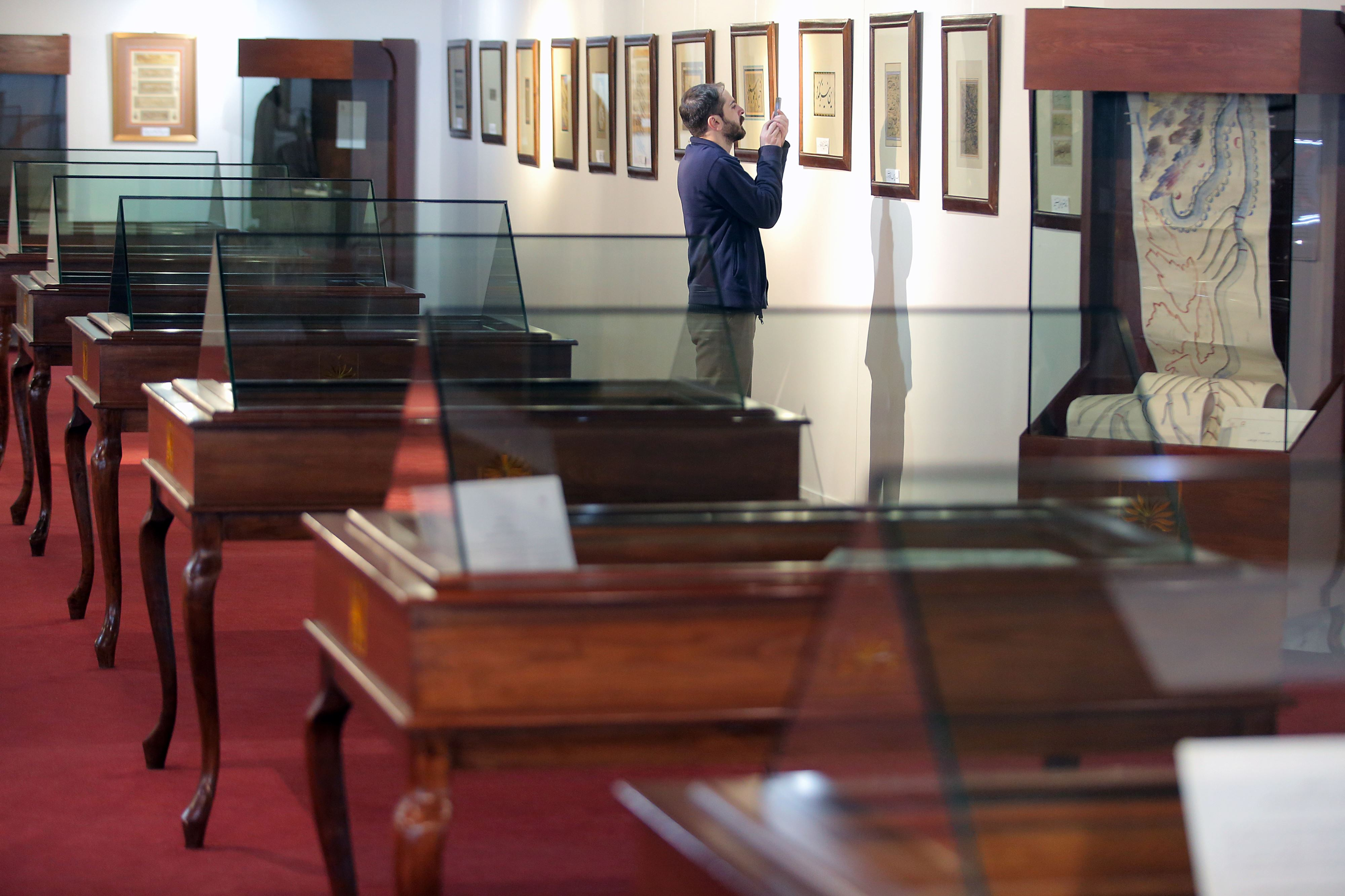
An inside view

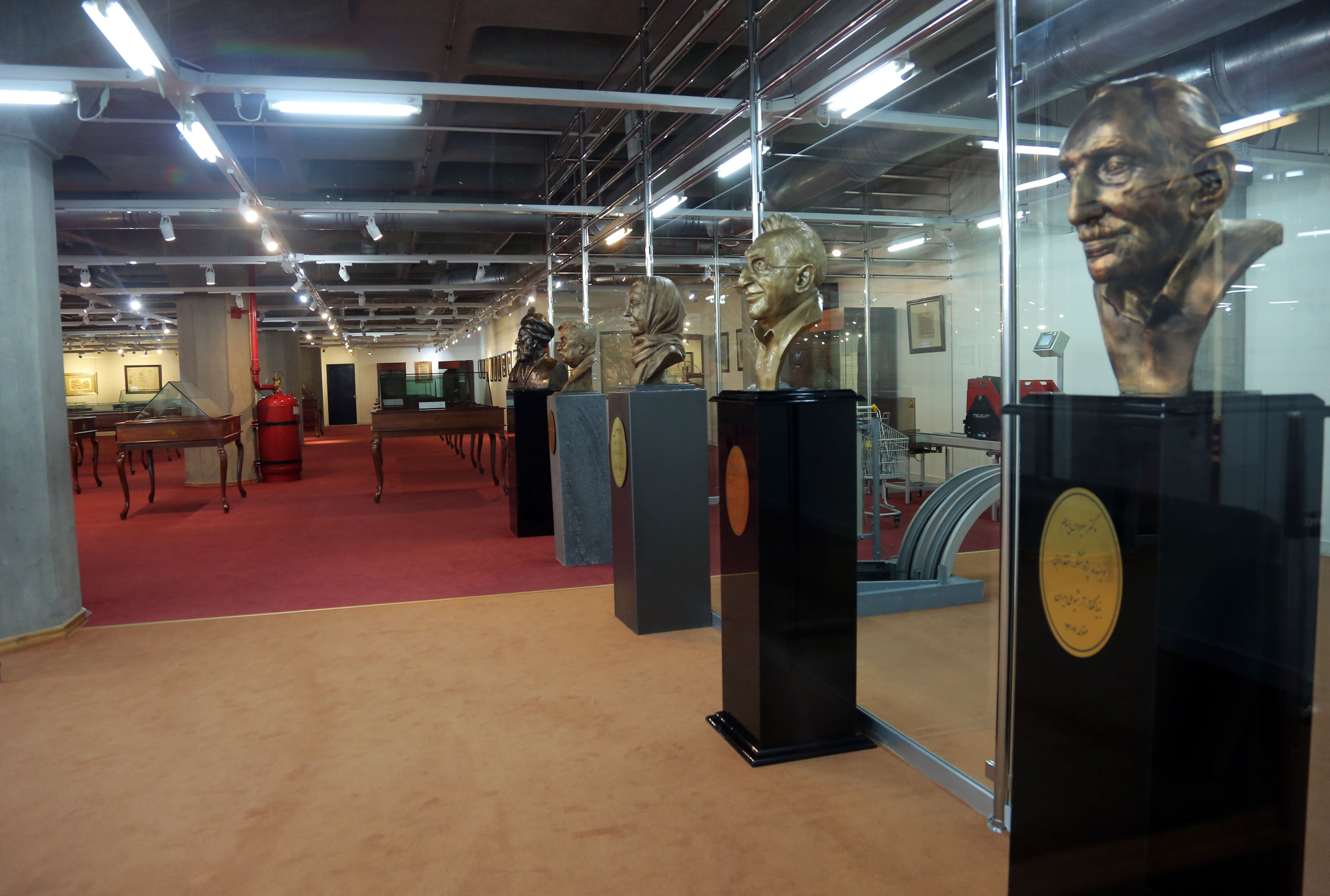
Busts of professors

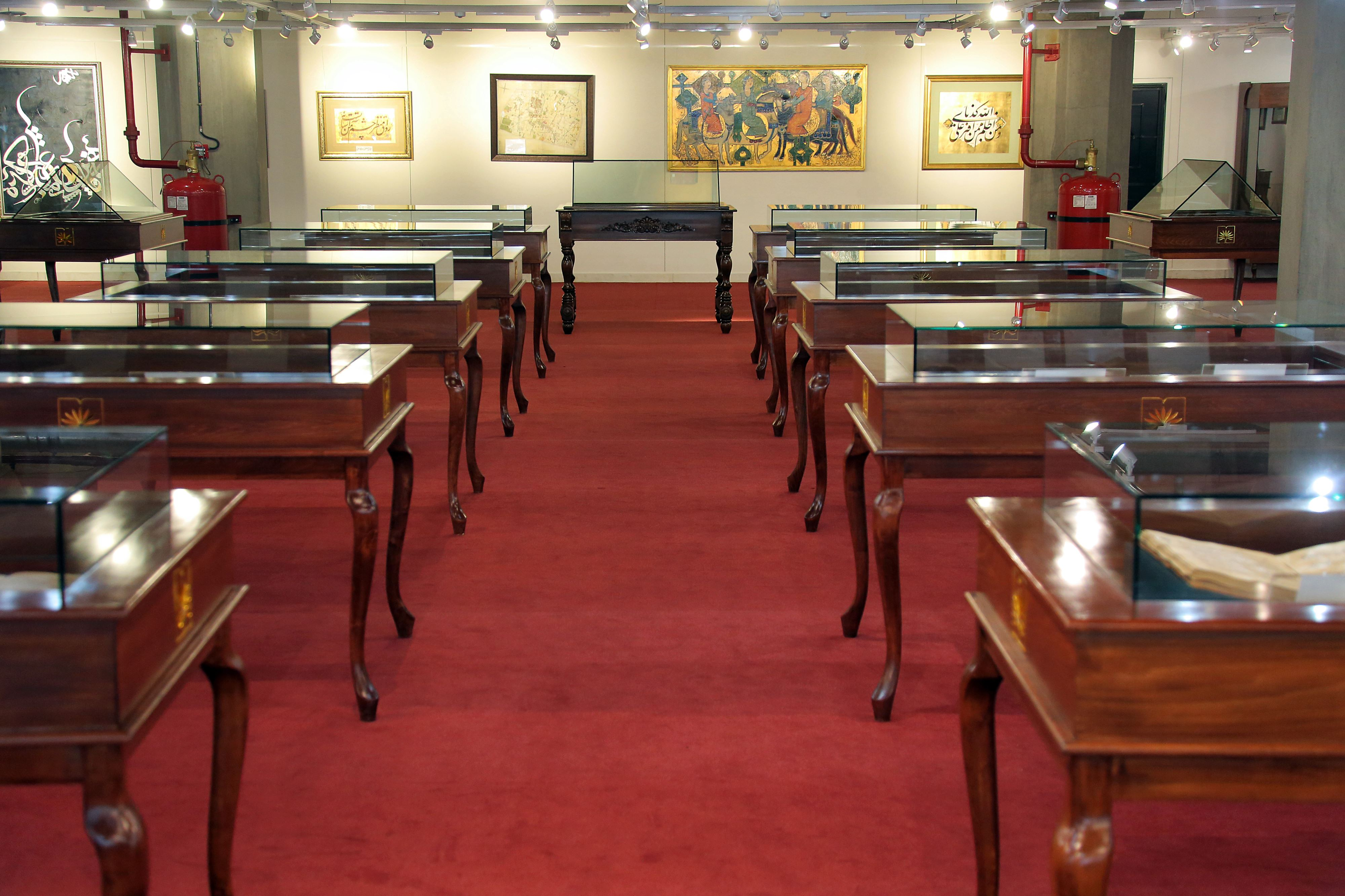
Inside of museum

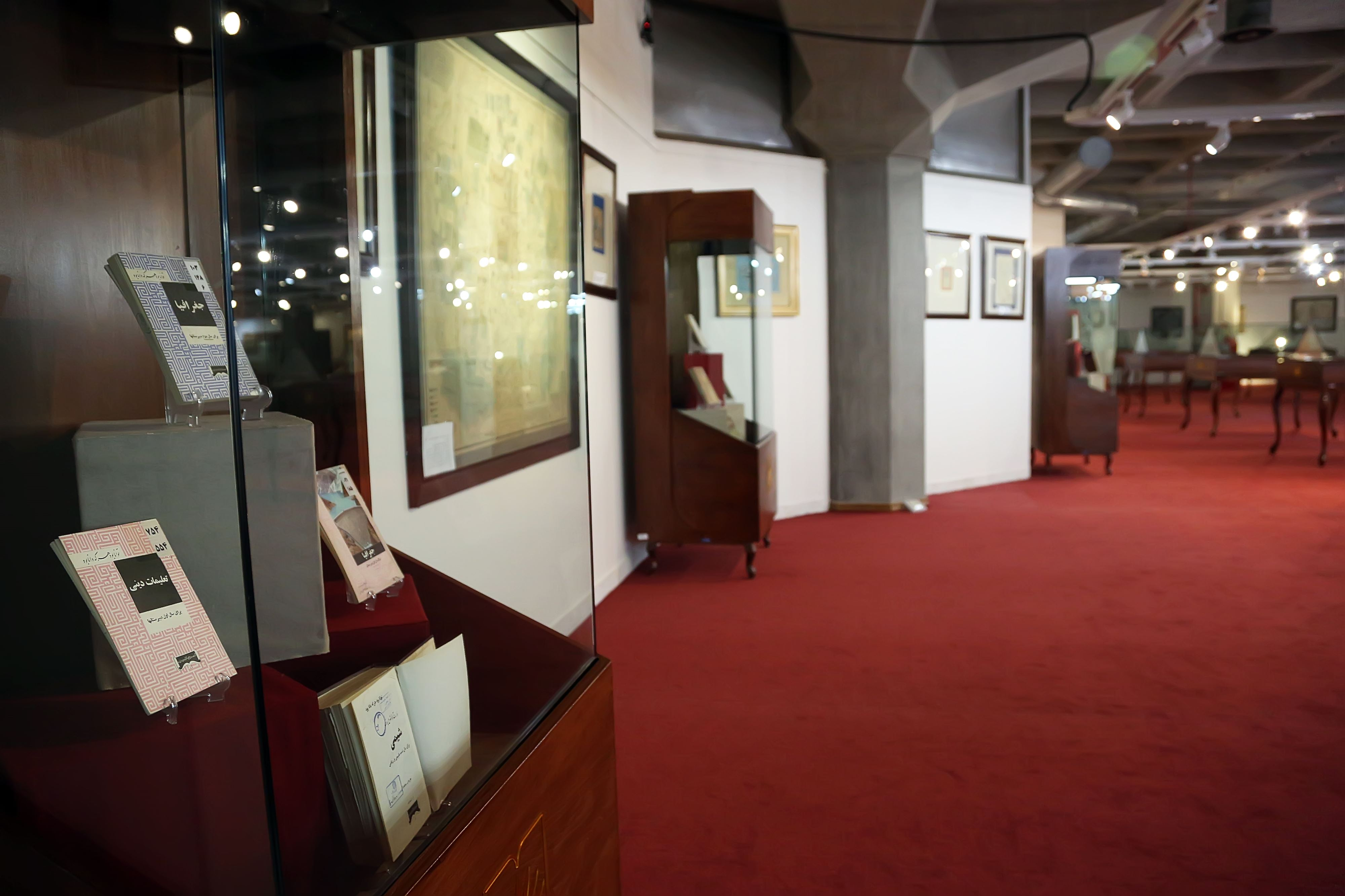
Inside of museum

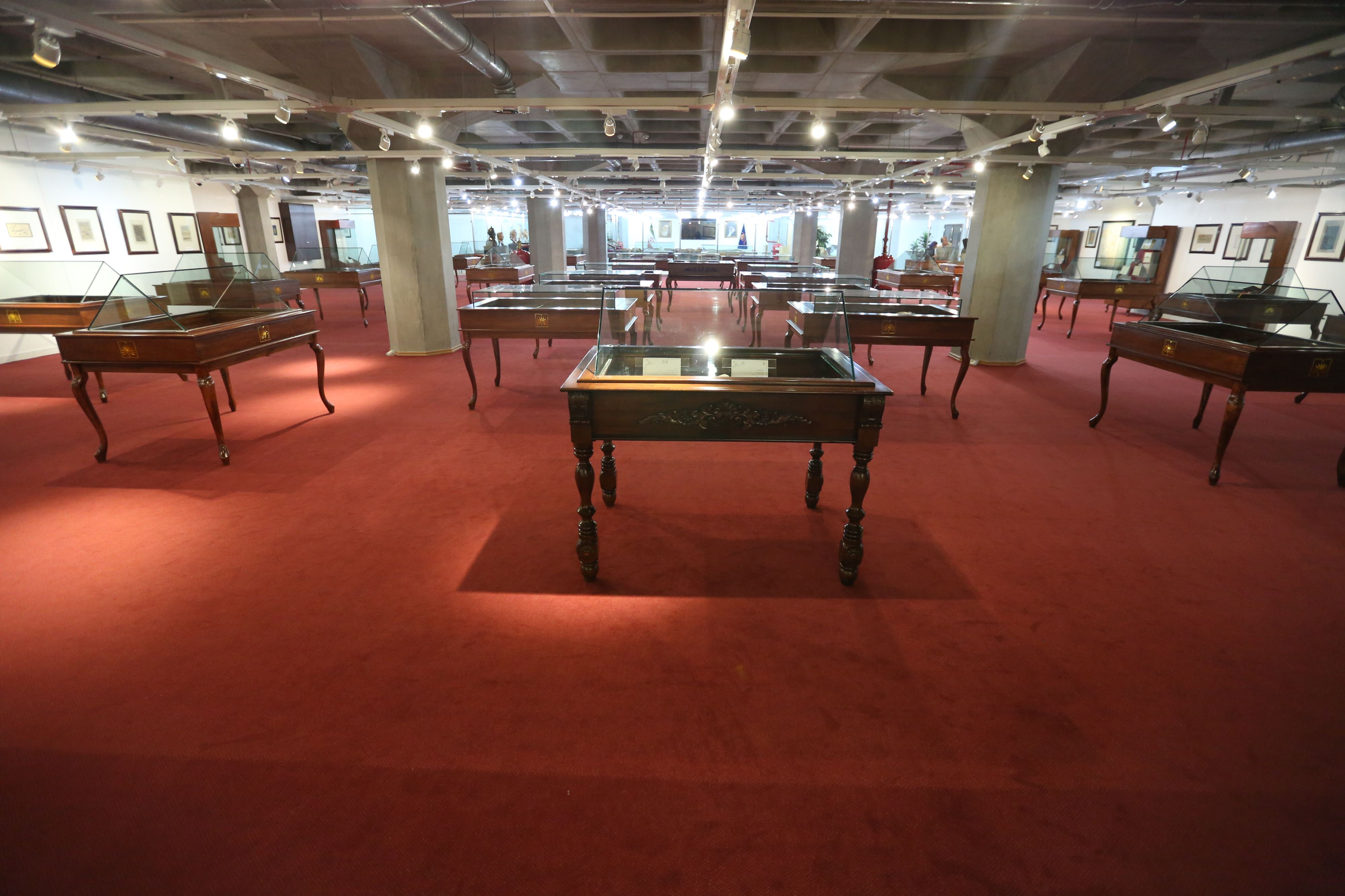
An inside view

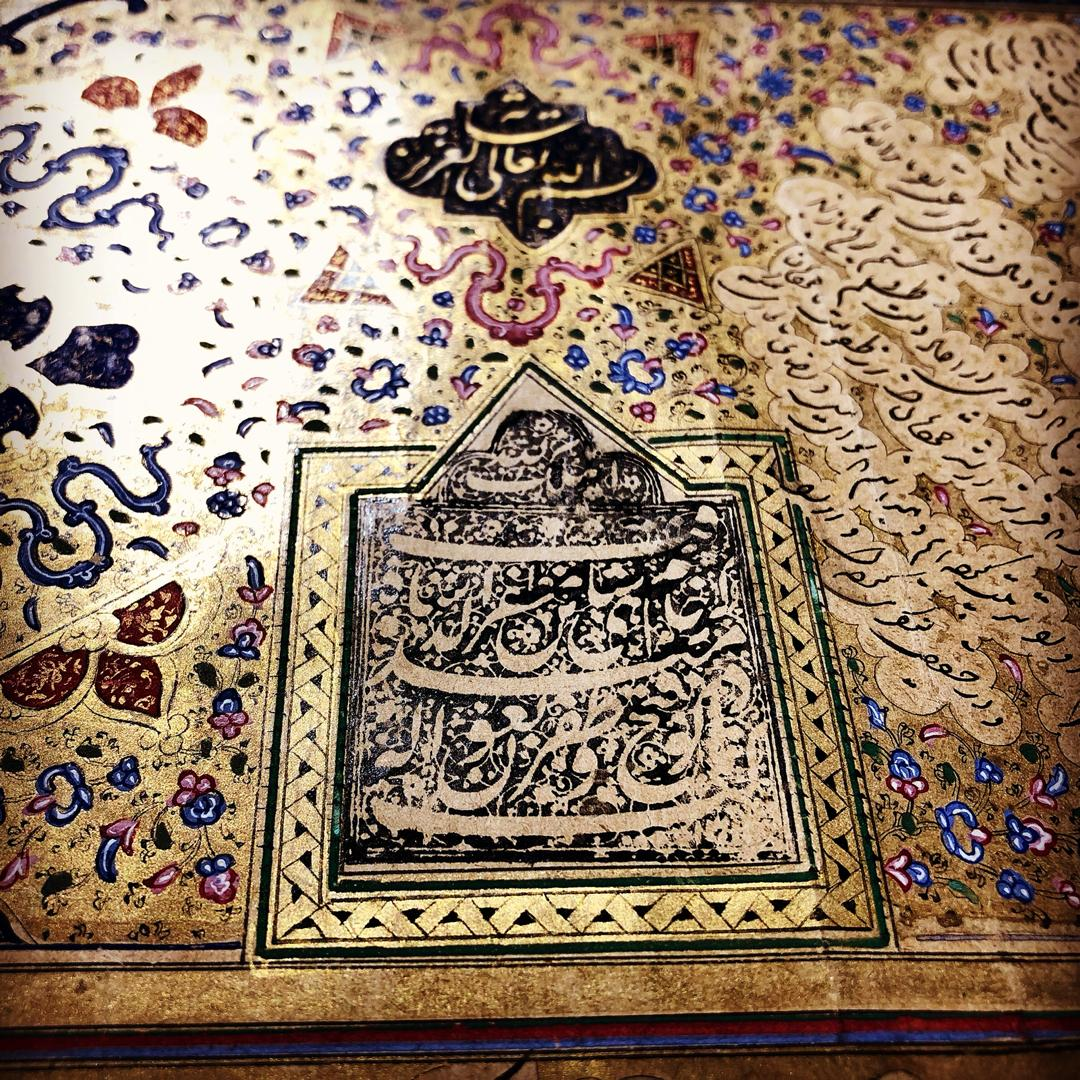
The decree electing Mohammad Ali Shah as the Crown Prince of Iran signed by Mozafaruddin Shah

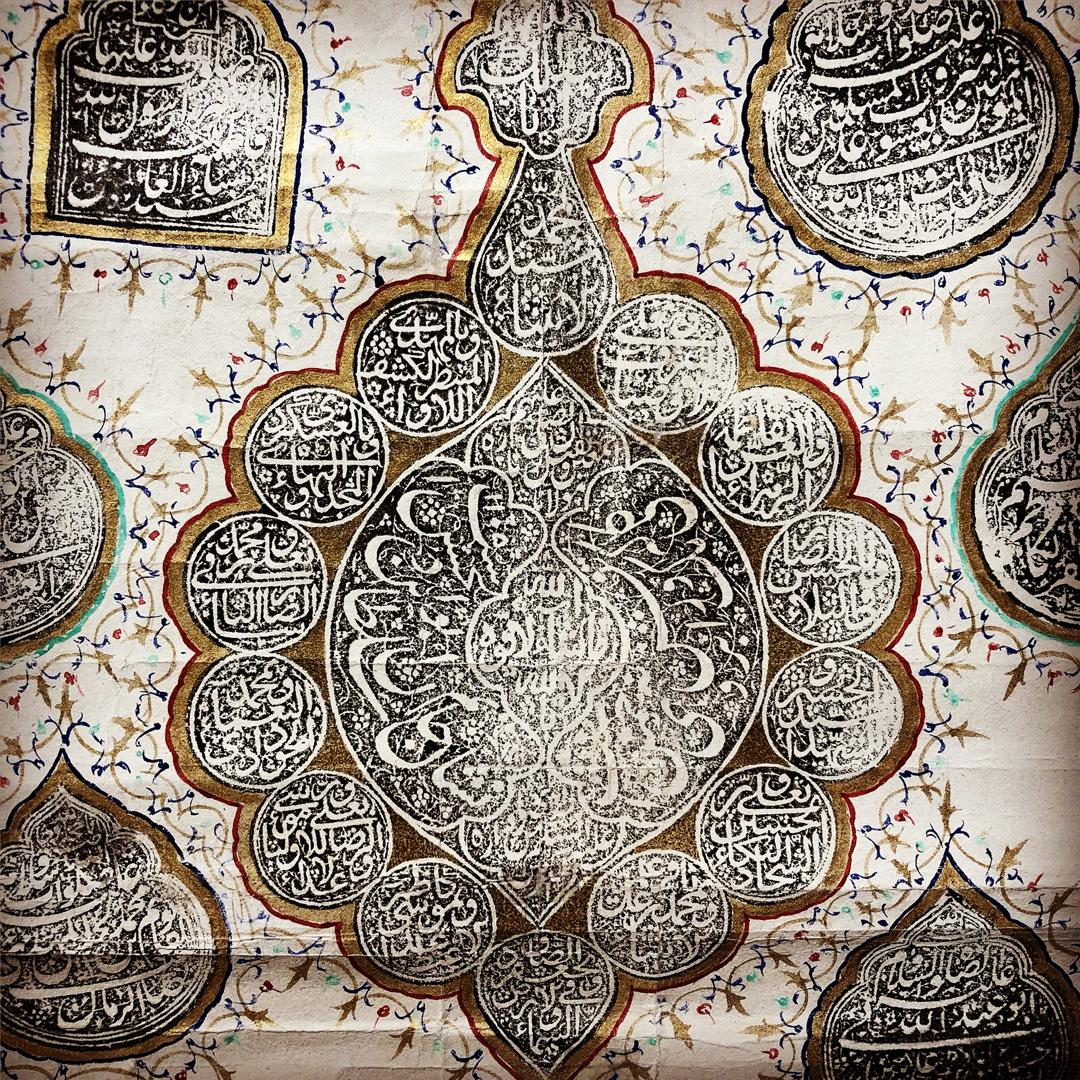
The decree appointing the guardianship of Astan Quds during Fath Ali Shah era.

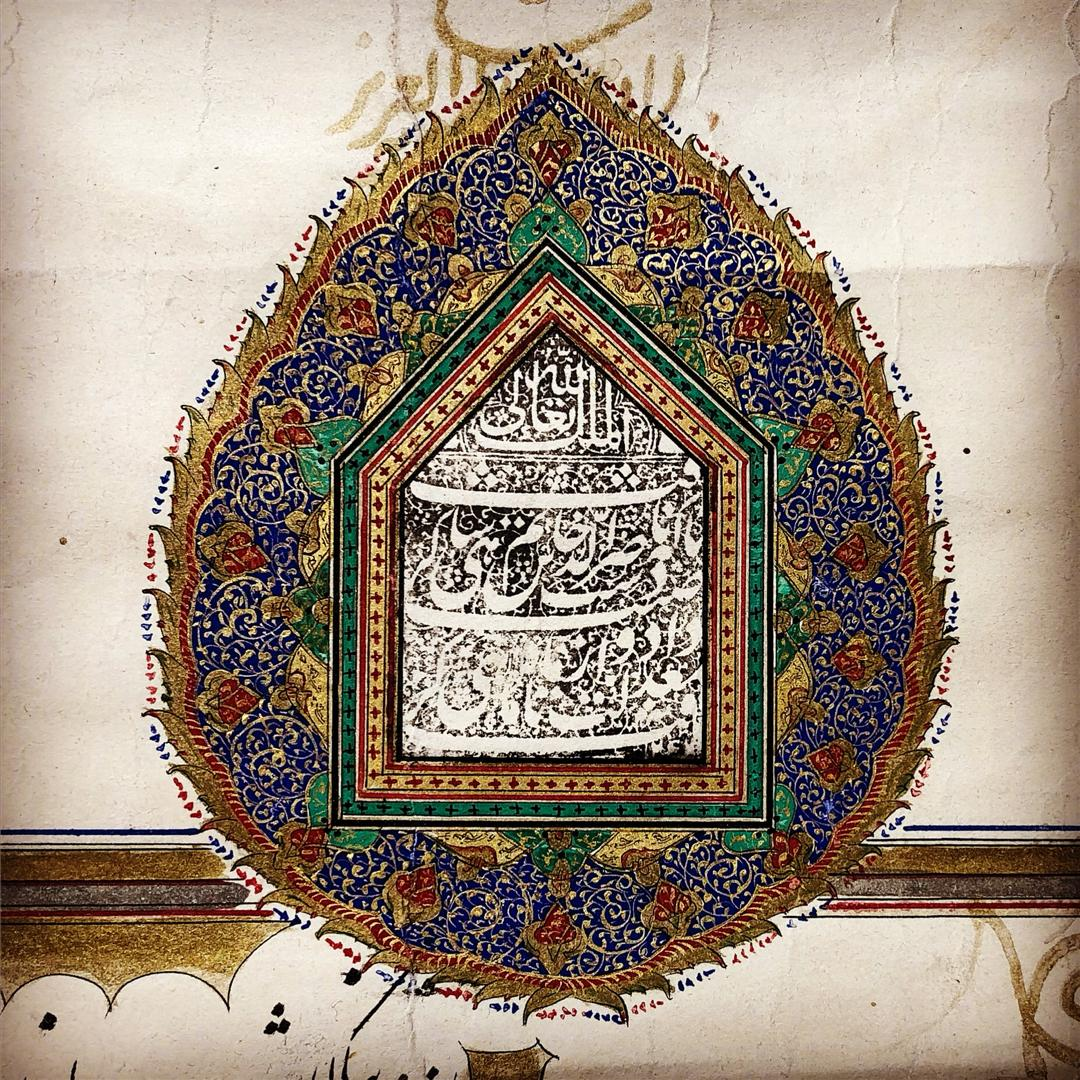
Seal of Naser al-Din Shah Qajar

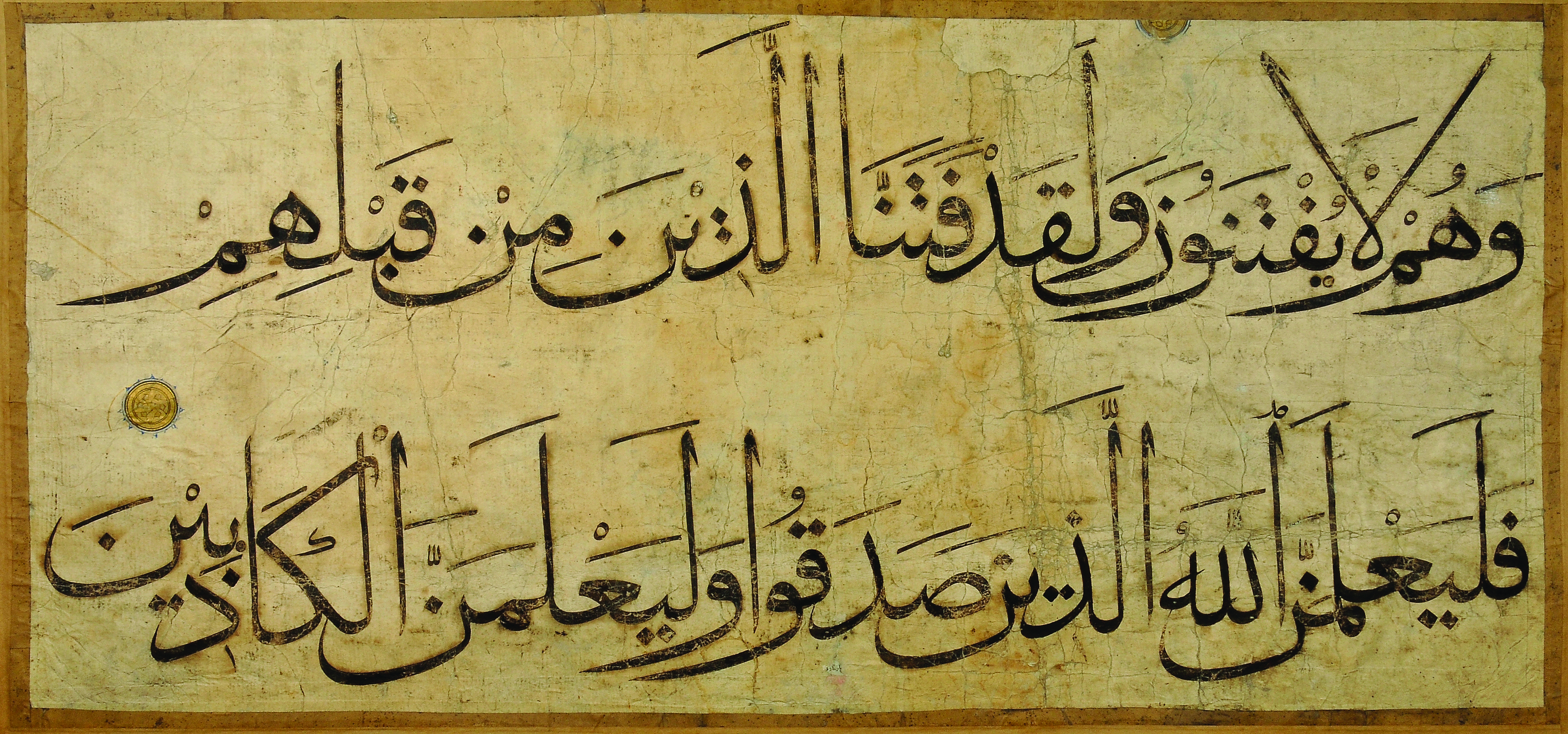
Baysunghur Qur'an

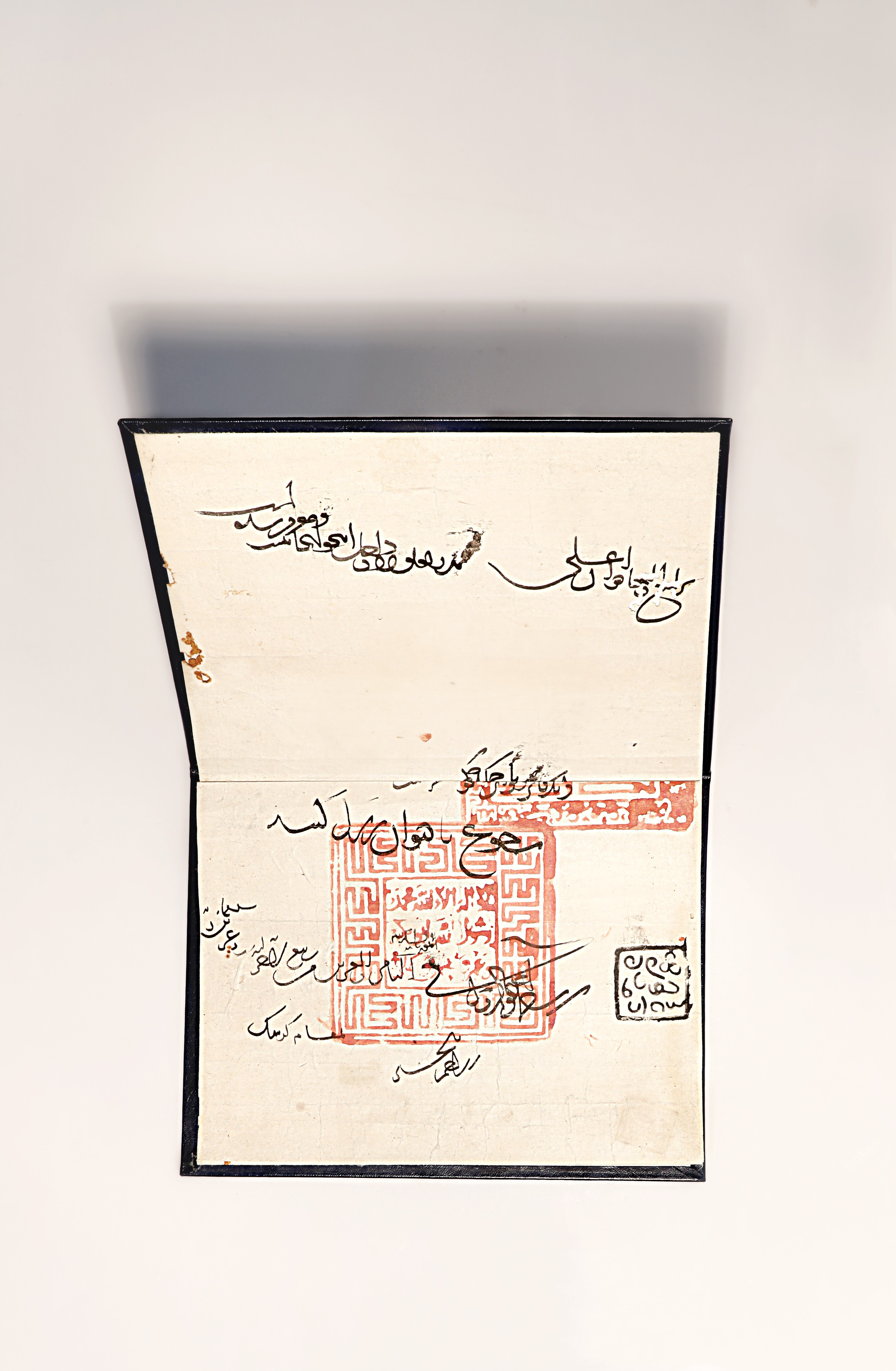
Tax exemption document of the ّIlkhanid period.

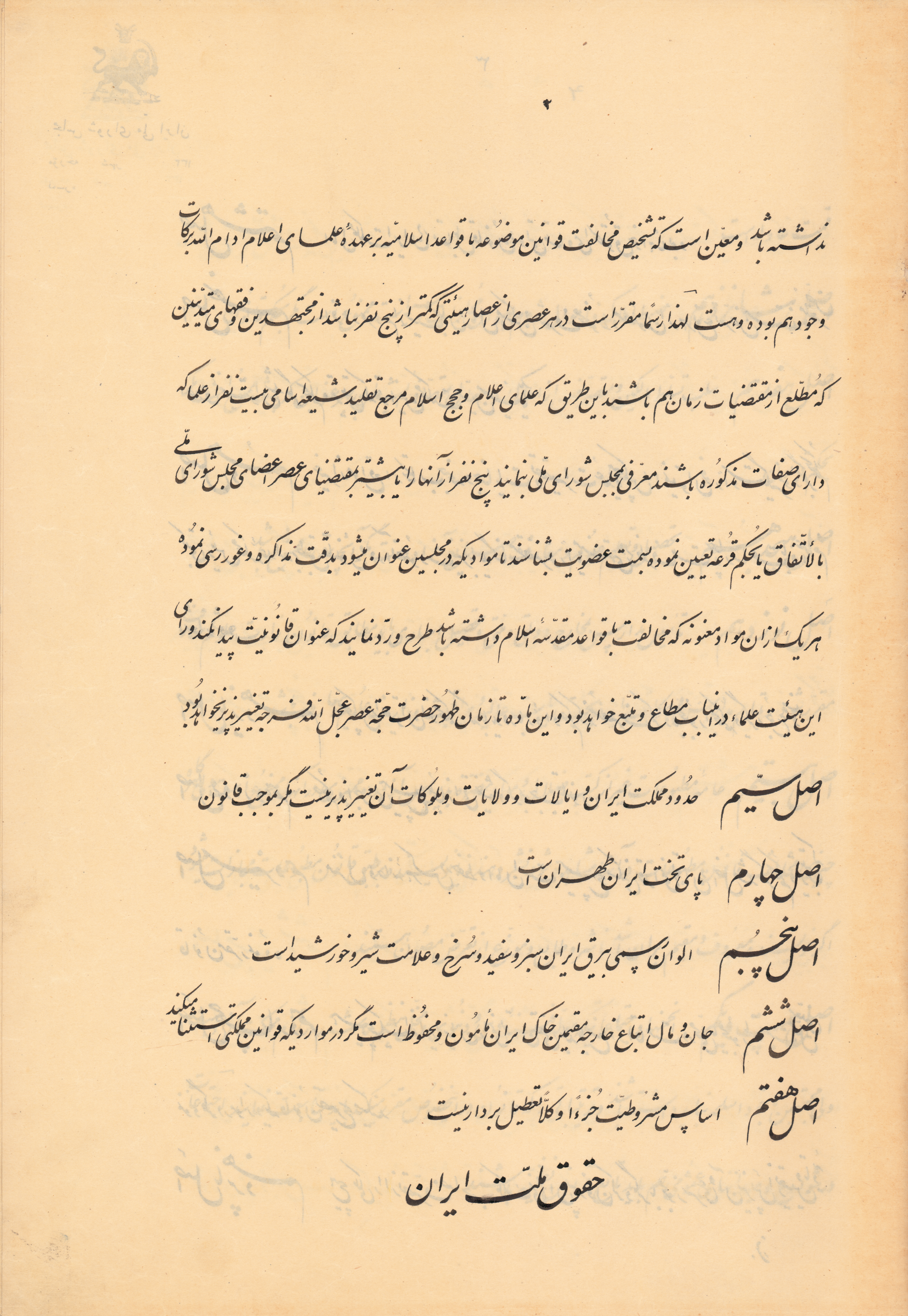
The fifth principle of the amendment to the constitutional law on the issue of the Iranian flag

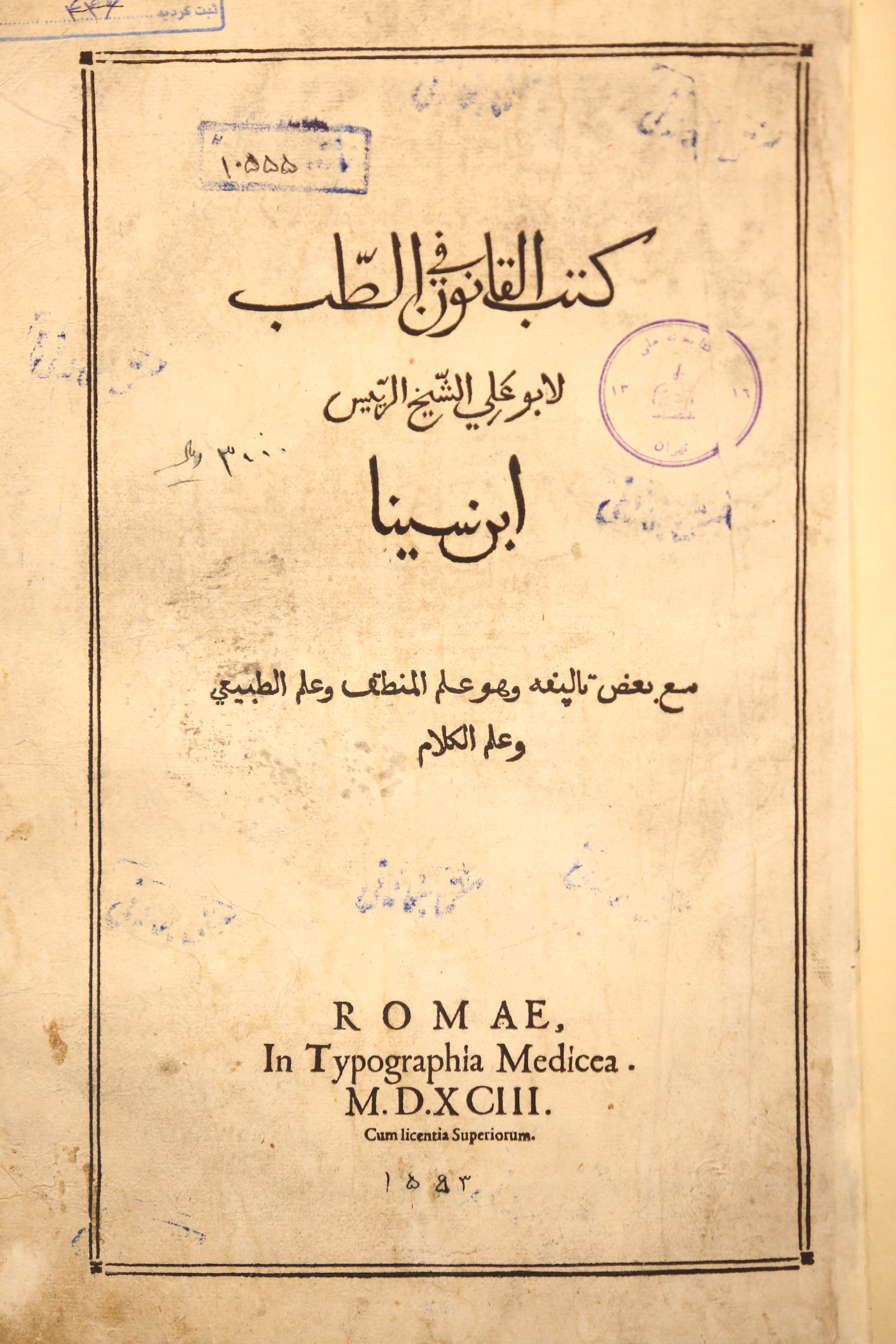
The Book of Law in Medicine; by Ibn Sina; Printed in 1553 AD in Rome

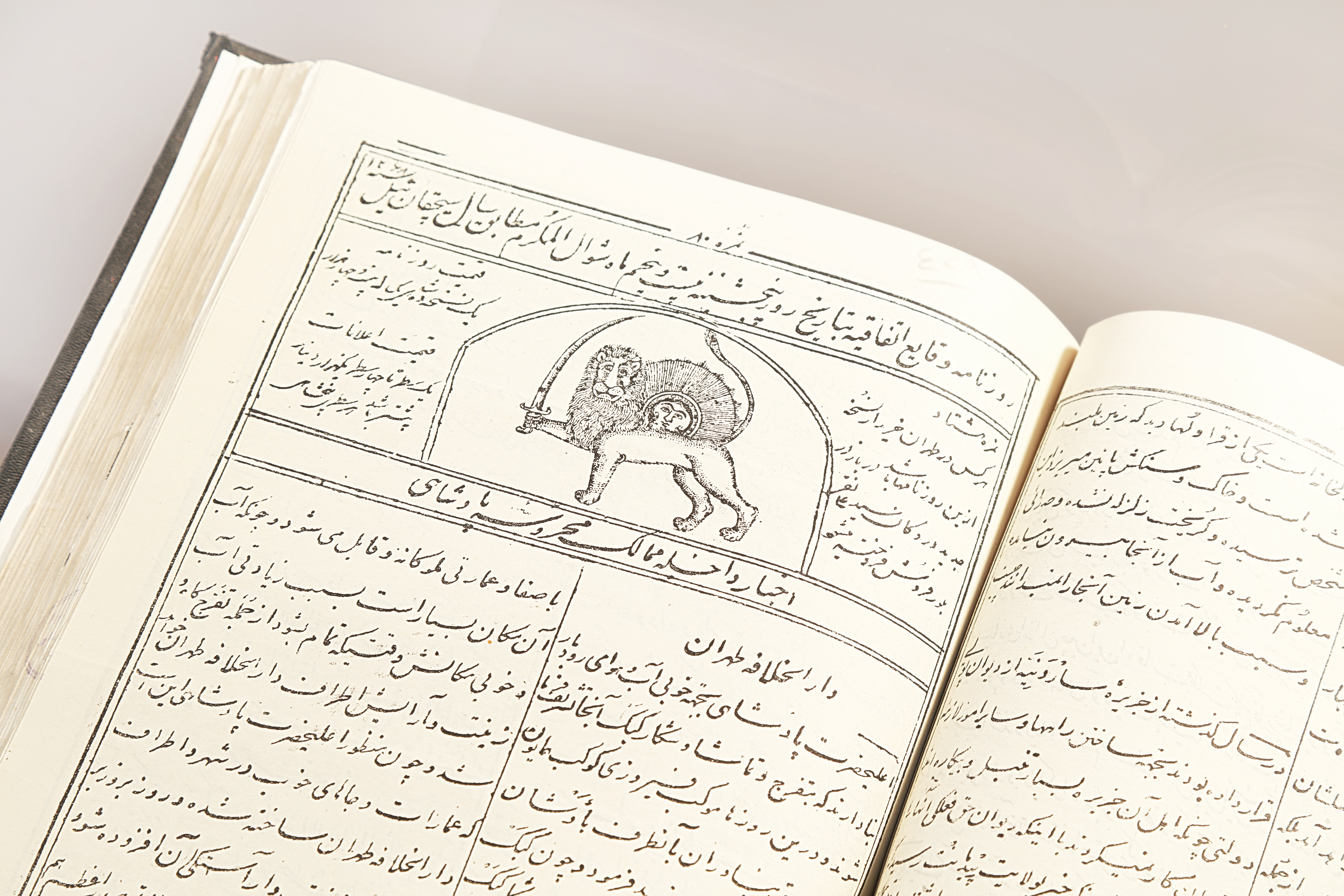
A newspaper belonging to Qajar era.
