= Naser Kamalian =

Iranian medical scholar (born 1931)

Nasser Kamalian (born 1931 in Iran) is an Iranian medical scholar who can be considered the father of modern neuropathology in Iran. He has published around 60 major articles in prominent Iranian and international medical journals, and has for 40 years been associated with Tehran University.

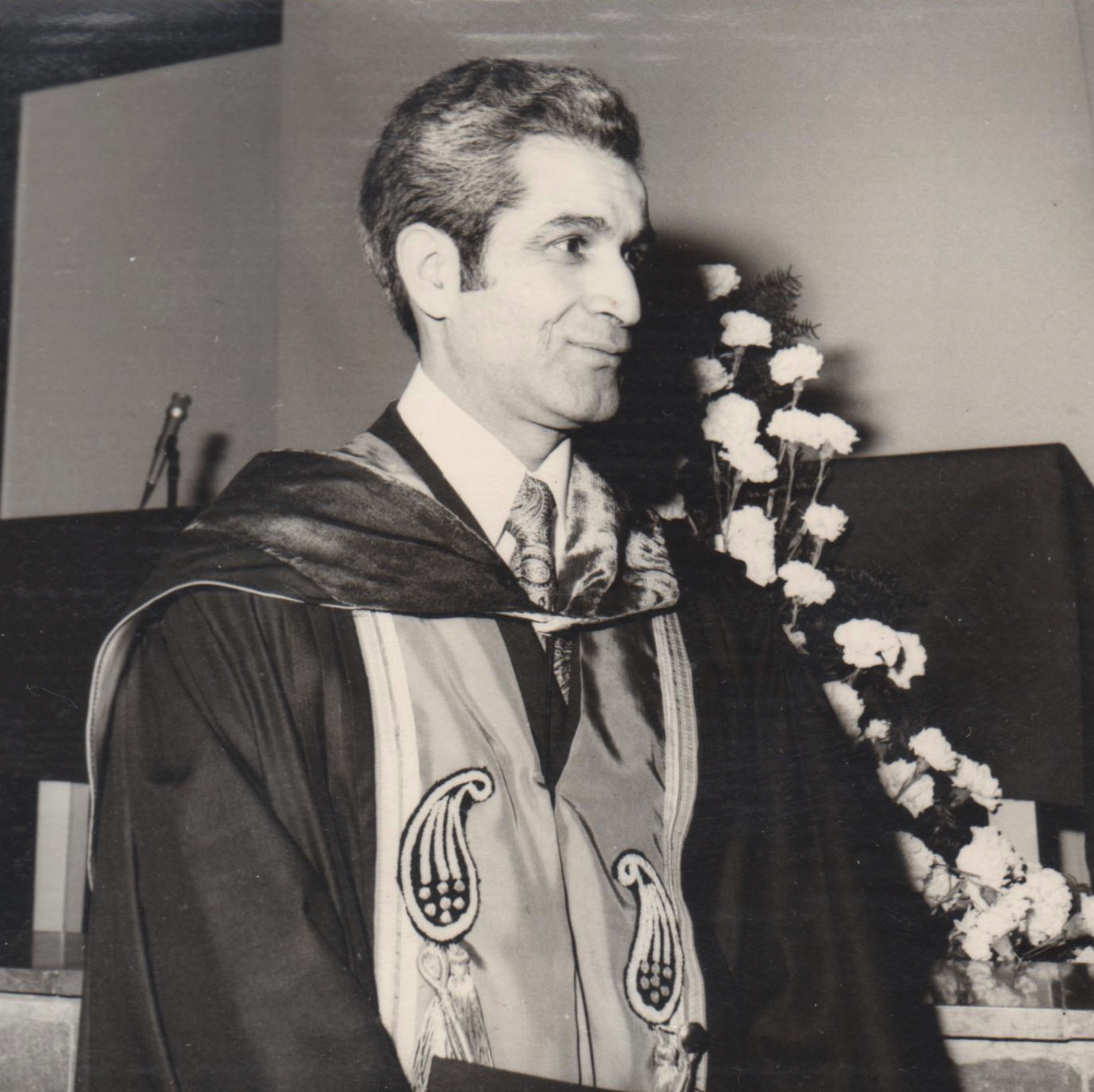
Professor Kamalian

== Education and career ==
Kamalian received his MD degree from Tehran University in 1958, completing a residency in Anatomical Pathology at the same institution in 1964. Remaining at the university he served as a lecturer in Anatomical until 1968, before moving to the University of Wisconsin, USA, from 1969–1974, where he obtained his specialty board in Anatomical Pathology and his sub-specialty board in Neuropathology. He has been a full professor of pathology at Tehran University since 1974.

Alongside his academic career he has held administrative positions, including (inter alia) as founder and head of the pathology department of Shariati Hospital, Dean of Tehran University of Medical Sciences (TUMS), Director of the pathology group of TUMS, member of the High Council of the Iranian Blood Transfusion Organization, and President of Shariati Hospital in Tehran.

== Publications ==
Dr. Kamalian is the first translator of Robin's Pathological Basis of Diseases into Persian. He has co-edited three major Persian textbooks on pathology and written five handbooks for medical residents and fellows. He has published 43 articles in Persian medical journals and has 20 international publications listed in PubMed.

=== Selected publications ===
- Kamalian, N; Abbassioun, K; Amirjamshidi, A; Shams-Shahrabadi, M (October 1987). "Paraganglioma of the filum terminale internum. Report of a case and review of the literature". J. Neurol. 235: 56–9. PMID 3323422.
- Kamalian, N; Ghafoorzadeh, D (1977). "Squamous cell carcinoma of the cervix, with extension in an in situ fashion into the endometrium". Int J Gynaecol Obstet. 15 (3): 267–9. PMID 611034.
- Kamalian, N; Keesey, RE; ZuRhein (Jan 1975). ""malignant" multiple sclerosis". Neurology. 25 (1): 25–30. PMID 803304.
- Kamalian, N; Troyer, WG (January 1974). "A case of combined rheumatic heart disease, syphilitic aortitis, and silico-tuberculosis". Wis. Med. J. 73: S3–6. PMID 4812546.
- Kamalian, N; Dudley, AW; Beroukhim, F (November 1973). "Wolman disease with jaundice and subarachnoid hemorrhage". Am. J. Dis. Child. 126: 671–5. PMID 4745160.
