= Jaleh Esfahani =

Iranian poet (1921–2007)

- ژاله اصفهانی
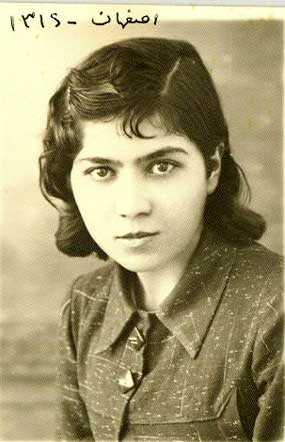
- Jaleh Esfahani in 1937
- Born: 1921; Isfahan, Iran
- Died: 29 November 2007 (aged 85–86); London, England
- Education: Baku State University; Lomonosov Moscow University
- Spouse: Šams-al-Din Badiʿ Tabrizi (m. 1946)
- Children: 2

Jaleh Esfahani (Persian: ژاله اصفهانی; 1921 – 29 November 2007) was an Iranian poet and literary scholar.

== Early life ==
Jaleh Esfahani (registered as Ethal) was born in 1921 in Isfahan into a land-owning family. She was educated at Behešt Āʾyin School, which at the time was run by British missionaries, and Nurbaḵš High School in Tehran. Her father disapproved of her attending school, Esfahani credited her mother for playing an instrumental role in her education. Esfahani first began to compose poems when she was seven. Her poems were published in newspapers such as Aḵtar, Sepantā and Bāḵtar, while she was still attending high school. Esfahani's first collection of poetry, Golhā-ye ḵᵛodru (Wild flowers) was published in Tehran in 1945. After graduating from school, she worked at the National Bank, one of only three women employed as an accountant there.

== Career ==
The first Congress of Iran's Writers was convened in Tehran in 1946, and Esfahani was the only woman attending, and recited a poetry piece to an audience of 2000 people. The same year, she married Šams-al-Din Badiʿ Tabrizi, a member of the communist Tudeh Party of Iran and an opponent of the Pahlavi regime. When the Tudeh Party was banned after a failed assassination attempt on Shah Mohammad Reza Pahlavi, the couple fled to the Soviet Union, settling in Baku. Whilst there, Esfahani gave birth to two sons and graduated from the Faculty of Philology of Baku State University in 1952. In 1954, the family moved to Moscow. She successfully defended her doctoral thesis entitled "Modern Poetry in Iran" at Lomonosov Moscow University. From 1960 to 1980, Esfahani worked as a literary scholar and taught Persian at Maxim Gorky Literature Institute. While there, she completed at least four research projects on various poets and different aspects of modern Persian poetry, the most significant of which was a study of the evolution of modernist poetics in Iran, Afghanistan and Tajikistan. During her time in Russia, she was the known as the sole female face of Persian literature. Esfahani would often travel to Tajikistan, Afghanistan and other Middle Asian to promote and present talks on literary co-operation between Persian speakers. In Tajikistan, Esfahani also published poems written in Russian and Azeri Turkish, as well as seven Persian collections in the Cyrillic language. As well as that, she wrote a number of dramatic works, one of which was performed in operatic form in Dushanbe in 1959 and 1960.

After the onset of Iranian Islamic revolution, Esfahani and her family returned to Iran in 1980. During Esfahani's exile, Parviz Natel-Khanlari published several of her poems in his journal Sokhan. Her first exilic collection of poetry, Zenda Rud, was published in 1965 in Moscow. The collection was banned in Iran after a brief circulation, but was reprinted in Tehran in 1981 after the revolution. She published Agar Hezar Qalam Dashtam (If I Had a Thousand Pens) in Tehran after her return. Two years after her return, the Tudeh Party was once again banned in Iran and Esfahani and her family reluctantly emigrated again, this time to London, where she spent the remainder of her life.

== Later life and death ==
During her time living in London, Esfahani devoted her time to writing her own work, releasing 10 volumes of original poetry. Her autobiography Sāya-ye sālhā (The Shadow of the Years) was released in 2000. In 2006, the first English translation of a selection of Esfahani's poems was written by her friend Rouhi Sahfii under the title Migrating Birds.

On 29 November 2007, Esfahani died in London at the age of 86. She was survived by her two sons.
