= Ahmad Samii Gilani =

Iranian writer and translator (1921–2023)

- احمد سمیعی گیلانی
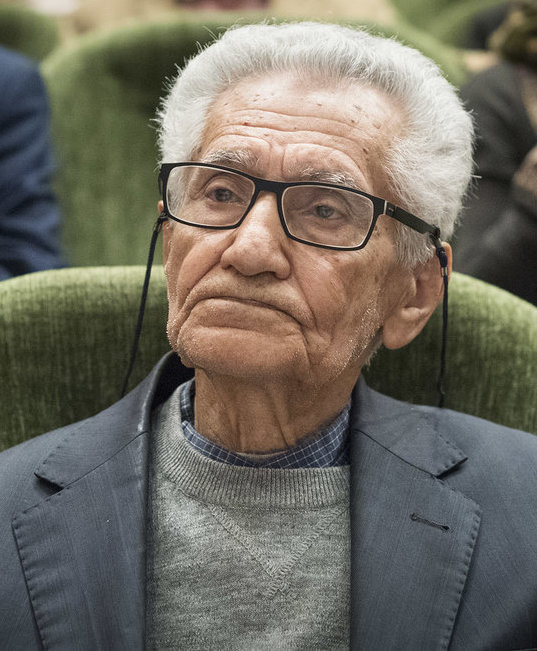
- Born: 31 January 1921; Tehran, Iran
- Died: 22 March 2023 (aged 102); Tehran, Iran
- Other names: Ahmad Samiei Gilani, Ahmad Sami'ei Gilani, Ahmed Samii Gilani
- Occupations: Writer, editor

Ahmad Samii Gilani (Persian: احمد سمیعی گیلانی; 31 January 1921 – 22 March 2023) was an Iranian writer, editor, translator, and academic.

== Life and career ==
Born in Tehran, the son of a mujtahid, Samii graduated in literature and got a master's degree in linguistics at the University of Tehran. A member of the Tudeh Party of Iran, he was imprisoned for two and a half years for his political activities. He worked as a Dehkhoda Dictionary editor and collaborated with the Franklin Institute, the Institute for Cultural Studies and Research, and the Soroush publishing house.

As an essayist, Samii is best known for the book Vīrāyeš va Negāreš (Persian: "ویرایش و نگارش", 'Editing and Writing'). Also a translator, his works include translations in Persian of Jean-Jacques Rousseau, Gustave Flaubert, George Sand, Denis Diderot, Michel de Montaigne and Noam Chomsky's works. He served as director of the contemporary literature department of the Academy of Persian Language and Literature, also editing the magazine of the academy from 1998 to 2019.

During his career, Samii received various awards and honours, notably the title of Commander of the Ordre des Palmes académiques. He died on 22 March 2023, at the age of 102.
