= Morteza Keyvan =

Iranian poet

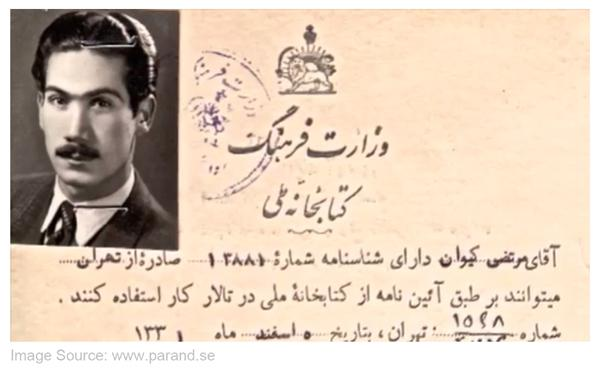
Morteza Keyvan (National Library of Iran membership Card, 1952)

Morteza Keyvan (Persian: مرتضی کیوان; 1921, Isfahan – 19 October 1954, Tehran) was an Iranian poet, art critic, newspaper editor and political activist of the Tudeh Party of Iran.

Keyvan married Puri Soltani in 1953. After the coup d'état of 1953, Keyvan was arrested by the Pahlavi regime for hiding three fellow Tudeh Party members of the Tudeh Military Network in his house and later sentenced to death on account of "treason".

He was executed by firing squad the same year on 19 October in the Qasr prison.

Keyvan was a friend and associate of many left-wing poets and writers of his time such as Ahmad Shamlou, Nima Youshij, Siavash Kasrai, Houshang Ebtehaj and many others.

Shamlou, Ebtehaj, Kasrai, Youshij and Ehsan Tabari have written poems in the memory of his death.
