= Pervez Amini Afshar =

Iranian military officer

Parviz Amini Afshar
- پرویز امینی افشار

Director of the Second Bureau
- In office 1978 – 11 February 1979
- Monarch: Mohammad Reza Pahlavi
- Prime Minister: Gholam Reza Azhari; Shapour Bakhtiar
- Preceded by: Naser Qoli Boroumand Jezi
- Succeeded by: Hedayatollah Hatami

Personal details
- Born: 1921 Tehran, Qajar Iran
- Died: February 20, 1979 (aged 58) Tehran, Iran
- Education: Iranian Military Academy

Military service
- Allegiance: Pahlavi Iran
- Branch/service: Imperial Iranian Army
- Years of service: 1941–1979
- Rank: Major general

Parviz Amini Afshar (Persian: پرویز امینی افشار; born 1921 – died 1979) was an Iranian Military Officer and the last Head of the Second Bureau.

General Parviz Amini Afshar was a prominent Iranian military figure who served as the final head of the Second Department of the Grand Imperial Armed Forces Headquarters. Unfortunately, following the Iranian Revolution, he faced execution, marking a tumultuous end to his military career. Amini Afshar played a significant role in historical events, particularly as one of the signatories of the Declaration of Neutrality by the army on February 22, 1979.

== Biography ==
Born into the esteemed Amini Afshar family, General Pervez was the younger brother of Brigadier General Byouk Amini Afshar and Brigadier General Iraj Amini Afshar. The family's military lineage added to his own dedication to serving the nation.

On February 1, 1979, Radio Iran broadcast the news of the execution of four high-ranking army officials, including General Pervez Amini Afshar. The list included Lieutenant General Naematollah Motamedi, the military governor and commander of the Qazvin Corps; Lieutenant General Pervez Amini Afshar, the chief of the Guard Corps; Brigadier General Manouchehr Malek, the commander of the Qazvin Armor Division; and Brigadier General Hossein Hamdaniyan, the head of the SAVAK in Kermanshah.

The executions took place between 3:00 and 4:45 AM, and the bodies of the condemned were sent to the forensic medicine department. This event marked a dark chapter in the aftermath of the Iranian Revolution, with several high-ranking military officials falling victim to political turmoil.

== Family tragedy ==
General Parviz Amini Afshar's family also faced grave consequences in the wake of the revolution. His brother, Brigadier General Iraj Amini Afshar, who had served as the commander of the Airborne Combat Group, was executed in 1979. Furthermore, Brigadier General Byouk Amini Afshar, initially appointed by the government of Engineer Mehdi Bazargan as the chief of the national gendarmerie, faced trial in 1982 and was sentenced to death on charges of "strengthening the foundations of the tyrannical regime of the Shah and issuing orders to shoot at the Muslim nation."

== Declaration of Neutrality ==
Notably, General Parviz Amini Afshar took part in the crucial meeting of army officials on February 22, where he assumed the role of the head of the Second Department of the Grand Imperial Armed Forces Headquarters under the chairmanship of General Abbas Gharabaghi. During this gathering, he played a pivotal role in signing the Declaration of Neutrality by the army, reflecting a historic moment that defined the military's stance amidst the political upheavals of the time.

The Declaration of Neutrality marked a significant shift in the Iranian military's position, signaling a detachment from the political turmoil that gripped the nation. General Pervez Amini Afshar's involvement in this declaration demonstrated his commitment to navigating the complex political landscape during a tumultuous period in Iranian history.
