= Abdollah Hedayat =

Iranian military officer (1899–1968)

- عبدالله هدایت
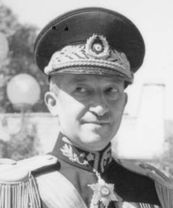

Chief of the Joint Staff
- In office 23 August 1955 – 15 March 1961
- Monarch: Mohammad Reza Pahlavi
- Prime Minister: Hossein Ala'; Manouchehr Eghbal; Jafar Sharif-Emami
- Preceded by: Nader Batmanghelidj
- Succeeded by: Abdol Hossein Hejazi

Minister of War
- In office 19 August 1953 – 17 September 1955
- Prime Minister: Fazlollah Zahedi
- Preceded by: Mohammad Mosaddegh
- Succeeded by: Ahmad Wosouq
- In office 2 July 1950 – 8 April 1951
- Prime Minister: Ali Razmara; Khalil Fahimi
- Preceded by: Morteza Yazdanpanah
- Succeeded by: Ali-Asghar Naghdi
- In office 12 October 1944 – 26 November 1944; Acting
- Prime Minister: Mohammad Sa'ed
- Preceded by: Mohammad Hossein Mirza Firouz
- Succeeded by: Ebrahim Zand

Personal details
- Born: 1899 Tehran, Qajar Iran
- Died: 1968 (aged 68–69) Tehran, Pahlavi Iran
- Education: War University (France)

Military service
- Allegiance: Qajar Iran (1923–1925); Pahlavi Iran (1925–1962)
- Branch/service: Ground Force
- Years of service: 1923–1962
- Rank: General

Abdollah Hedayat (Persian: عبدالله هدایت; 1899–1968) was an army officer who served as the Chief of General Staff at the Imperial Iranian Army.

== Early life and education ==
Hedayat was born in 1899 and was the son of Gholam Reza Hedayat, also known as Mokhber Al Dawlah. He graduated from the Nizam School of Mushir Al Dawlah. He studied military science in France receiving a degree from the Ecole de Guerre and continued his education in Fontainebleau.

== Career ==
Following graduation Hedayat joined the Imperial Army and served in various posts, including deputy chief of the General Staff in May 1942 and commandant of the Officers’ School in November 1942. He also taught at Tehran University of War. He was the undersecretary at the Ministry of War in April 1944 and acting minister of war in September 1944. He was named as the director of artillery in November 1945. He was again appointed undersecretary at the Ministry of War in February 1946.

From 26 June 1950 to 11 March 1951 he served as the minister of war in the cabinet of Prime Minister Haj Ali Razmara. Hedayat was one of the close colleagues of Razmara in the army. On 7 September 1953, he was named the minister of national defense to the cabinet led by Prime Minister Fazlollah Zahedi. On 1955 Hedayat was appointed chief of the supreme commander's staff and became the first military officer to hold this title. He served in the post with rank of cabinet minister and was the minister of war from 1 April 1955 in the cabinet led by Prime Minister Hossein Ala'. His military rank was general. Hedayat's term ended in 1961, and he was replaced by Abdol Hossein Hejazi in the post.

=== Arrest ===
Hedayat and two other generals were arrested in November 1962 due to corruption allegations in an anti-corruption campaign initiated by Prime Minister Ali Amini. It was the Shah who advised Ali Amini to arrest them. Hedayat was taken to the Qasr prison and was tried between March and November 1963. He was sentenced to two-year prison in addition to the payment of a fine of nearly $16,000.

== Personal life and death ==
Abdollah Hedayat was married to Tourandokht Mazaher. His sister was married to the brother of Sadegh Hedayat. He was fluent in French. He died in 1968.

=== Honors ===
Hedayat was the recipient of the US Legion of Merit for his actions during World War II in the Imperial Iranian army which was awarded to him in September 1955.
