= Hasan Arfa =

Iranian general (1895–1983)

Timsar Hasan Arfa
- حسن ارفع
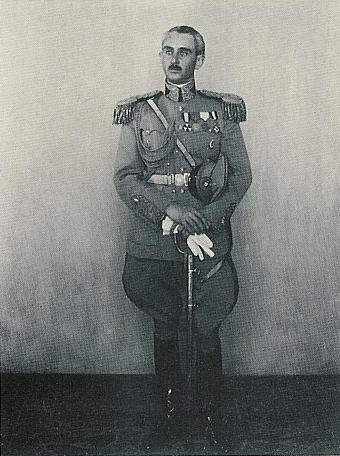
- Hasan Arfa as pictured in 1944

Iranian Ambassador to Pakistan
- In office 21 January 1962 – 20 January 1963
- Monarch: Mohammad Reza Pahlavi
- Prime Minister: Asadollah Alam
- Preceded by: Jafar Kafai
- Succeeded by: Musa Nuri Esfandiari

Iranian Ambassador to Turkey
- In office 22 December 1957 – 21 December 1961
- Monarch: Mohammad Reza Pahlavi
- Prime Minister: Manouchehr Eghbal; Jafar Sharif-Emami; Ali Amini
- Preceded by: Musa Nuri Esfandiari
- Succeeded by: Amir-Abbas Hoveyda

Minister of Roads
- In office 20 March – 28 April 1950
- Monarch: Mohammad Reza Pahlavi
- Prime Minister: Hossein Ala'
- Preceded by: Jafar Sharif-Emami
- Succeeded by: Javad Bushehri

Chief of the Joint Staff
- In office 27 December 1944 – 16 February 1946
- Monarch: Mohammad Reza Pahlavi
- Prime Minister: Morteza-Qoli Bayat; Ebrahim Hakimi; Mohsen Sadr; Ebrahim Hakimi; Ahmad Qavam
- Preceded by: Ali Razmara
- Succeeded by: Farajollah Aghevli
- In office 3 March 1943 – 23 July 1943
- Monarch: Mohammad Reza Pahlavi
- Prime Minister: Ali Soheili
- Preceded by: Morteza Yazdanpanah
- Succeeded by: Ali Razmara

Director of the Second Bureau
- In office 1942–?
- Monarch: Mohammad Reza Pahlavi
- Prime Minister: Mohammad Ali Foroughi
- Preceded by: Ali Riazi
- Succeeded by: Habibollah Deyhimi

Director of Officer's' Academy
- In office 1932–1936
- Monarch: Reza Shah
- Prime Minister: Mehdi Qoli Hedayat; Mohammad Ali Foroughi; Mahmoud Djam
- Preceded by: ?
- Succeeded by: ?

Personal details
- Born: 9 May 1895 Tbilisi, Russian Empire (now Georgia)
- Died: 1983 Monte Carlo, Monaco
- Party: Aria Party
- Occupation: Officer, Ambassador

Military service
- Allegiance: Qajar Iran (1912–1925); Pahlavi Iran (1925–1947)
- Branch/service: Imperial Iranian Ground Force
- Years of service: 1912–1947
- Rank: Major General
- Commands: Army Training Center (?–?); 1st Division (?–?); Inspector General of the Cavalry (1936–1944)
- Battles/wars: Simko Shikak revolt (1918–1922); Luri tribal insurgency in Pahlavi Iran; World War II; Anglo-Soviet invasion of Iran; Hama Rashid revolt; Iran crisis of 1946

Hasan Arfa (Persian: حسن ارفع; 9 May 1895 – 1983) was an Iranian general and ambassador during the Pahlavi era.

He was a leading figure in the British military network in Iran.

== Early life ==
Hasan Arfa was born in Tbilisi (then part of the Russian Empire) to an Anglo-Russian mother and Iranian father. His mother, Ludmilla Jervis, was the daughter of a British diplomat and a Russian woman of the aristocratic Demidov family. His father, Reza Khan Arfa Danesh, was a veteran Iranian diplomat serving as consul-general in Tbilisi; he later served as ambassador to the Ottoman and Russian Empire. Arfa's parents divorced in 1900, after Arfa and his mother had moved to Paris, but his father provided comfortable homes in Europe for them. When he was four years old, his father obtained the title Arfa al-Sultan for him from Mozaffar ad-Din Shah Qajar in exchange for a substantial payment. Hasan Arfa claimed that the Shah bestowed the title on him during a visit to Europe, in Saint Petersburg, because of his eloquence and charm in conversation.

== Education and Early Career ==
Arfa received his early education from tutor Mohammad Sa'ed and later attended private schools in Switzerland, France, and Monaco. While his father was serving as Iran's ambassador to the Ottoman Empire, Arfa enrolled in 1912 at the ottoman Military High School, two Years later In early 1914, he joined the Iranian Army, and during the early part of World War I that organization sponsored his training as a cavalry officer with the Swiss army. In 1923, he was among the Iranian students sent to France, where he completed an advanced cavalry course at the Saint-Cyr Special Military School and the Saumur Cavalry School He joined the Iranian Gendarmerie in 1920, and later, the army. As a cavalry officer, he campaigned against rebellious tribes in Azerbaijan, Kurdistan, Lorestan, and during the 1920s and rose rapidly through the ranks.

== The Pahlavis ==
Arfa first met Reza Shah Pahlavi, who was then Minister of War, at the outset of the campaign against the Kurds in 1921. Reza Shah's forceful character left a deep impression on him, and Arfa remained a loyal supporter of the Pahlavis throughout his life. In 1923, Arfa married Hilda Bewicke, a British ballerina in Sergei Diaghilev's Russian Ballet whom he met in Monaco; they had one daughter, Leila. He subsequently served a brief tour in 1926 as military attaché in London and attended the Staff College in Paris from 1927 to 1929. After his training in France, he was promoted to the rank of lieutenant Colonel and placed in command of the newly formed Pahlavi Guards Cavalry Regiment, which he turned into a highly disciplined and professional unit. Reza Shah made him commandant of the Military Academy and in 1932 promoted him to the rank of colonel. In 1934, Arfa accompanied Reza Shah on his official visit to Turkey. He was appointed inspector general of the cavalry and armed forces in 1936 and promoted to Brigadier General in 1939. During the joint Anglo-Soviet Invasion of Iran in August 1941, the shah appointed Arfa chief of staff in charge of the defenses for Tehran. After the British and Soviets defeated the Iranian army and forced Reza Shah to abdicate, his son and successor, Mohammad Reza Pahlavi, appointed Arfa chief of military intelligence.

Arfa became involved in national politics during the 1940s and 1950s. As Chief of the Joint Staff from 1944 to 1946, he authorized the supply of weapons to the Shahsavan tribesmen who opposed the Azerbaijan People's Government. In early 1946, Arfa was instrumental in gathering signatures of parliamentary deputies for a petition supporting Iran's complaint before the United Nations Security Council that Soviet forces continued to occupy northern Iran in contravention of an agreement to withdraw. Arfa's actions placed him in the camp of political leaders who tended to perceive malevolent intentions in Soviet policies but benign intentions in British policies. The pro-Soviet/anti-British politicians denounced Arfa in parliament and the press, and consequently Prime Minister Ahmad Qavam insisted that Arfa be dismissed from his post as chief of the general staff. In 1946, Arfa was imprisoned for seven months. He was eventually exonerated, but he was retired summarily from active duty in March 1947.

Arfa blamed his successor, Lt. Gen. Ali Razmara, for his forced retirement and subsequently co-operated with his political rivals, especially after Razmara was appointed prime minister in 1950. Nevertheless, Arfa genuinely was disturbed when Razmara was assassinated in 1951, because he believed the increasing level of political violence threatened the country. He served as minister of roads and communications in the brief government of Prime Minister Hossein Ala' during the month following Razmara's assassination, before the parliament voted in Mohammad Mosaddegh as premier.

Arfa distrusted Mossadegh and formed a political group, the National Movement, to disrupt gatherings of Mossadegh supporters, whom he considered to be extremists opposed to the continuation of the monarchy and a strong army. The National Movement's newspaper published many articles written by Arfa, supporting the shah and respect for Islam. Arfa maintained contact with a variety of political activists, including Mozzafar Baghai of the Toilers' party, the fiery preacher Ayatollah Sayyed Abu al-Qasem Kashani, and Shaban Jafari, an organizer of street mobs. Arfa became a founding member of the secret committee of military officers, the Committee to Save the Fatherland, formed in 1952 with the objective of overthrowing Mossadegh. Following the 1953 military coup that restored the shah to power, he served as Iran's ambassador to Turkey (1957–1961) and Pakistan (1962–1963). Subsequently he retired from active government service. He left Iran at the time of the 1979 Iranian Revolution and died in Monte Carlo, Monaco in 1983.

== Sources ==
- Azimi, F. "ARFAʿ, ḤASAN". Encyclopaedia Iranica.
