= Morteza Yazdanpanah =

Iranian politician and military officer (1888–1972)

- مرتضی یزدان‌پناه
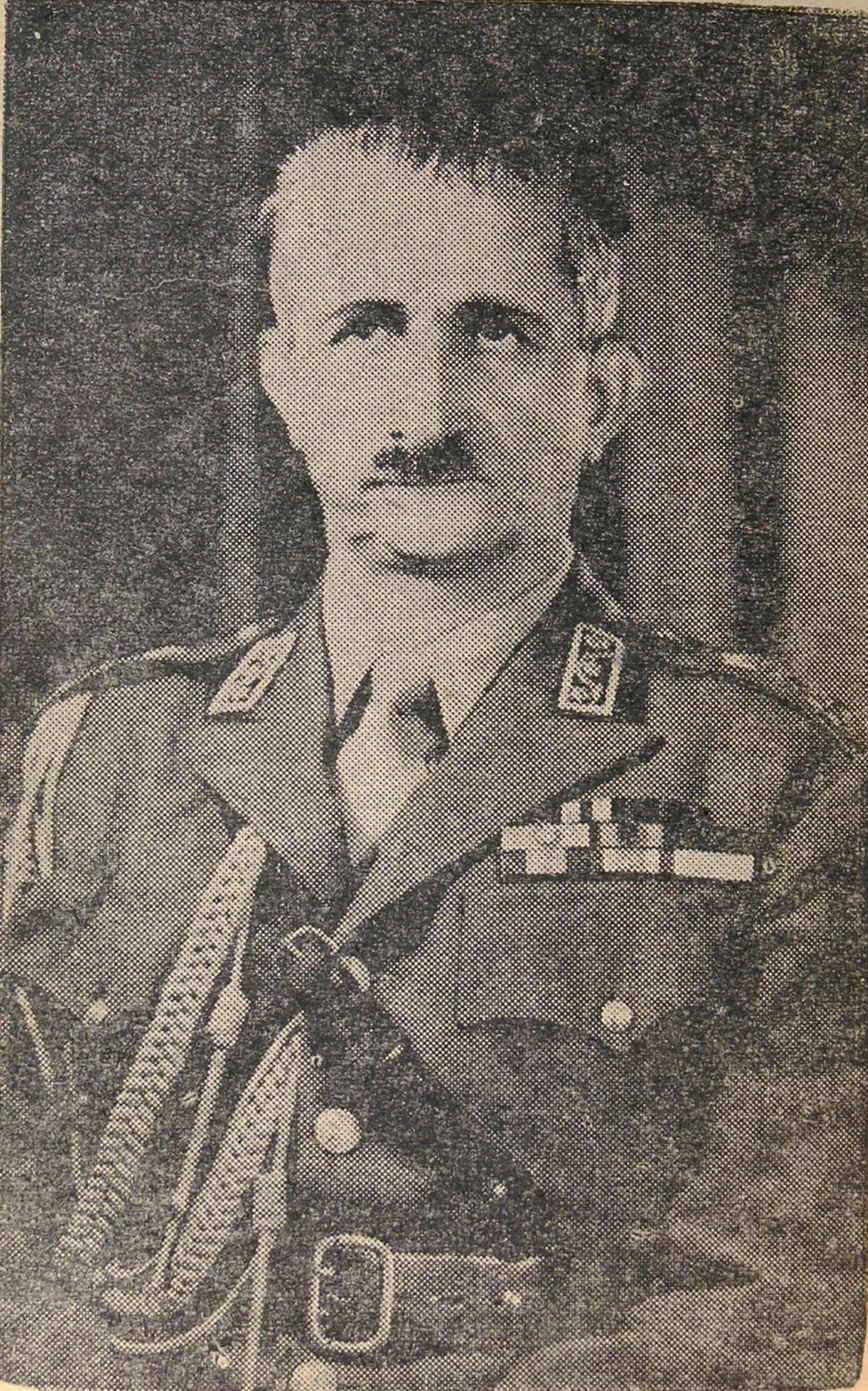

Head of the Imperial Inspectorate Organization
- In office 1968–1970
- Monarch: Mohammad Reza Pahlavi
- Prime Minister: Amir-Abbas Hoveyda
- Preceded by: Office Reestablished
- Succeeded by: Hossein Fardoust
- In office 1958–1962
- Prime Minister: Manouchehr Eghbal; Jafar Sharif-Emami; Ali Amini
- Preceded by: Office Established
- Succeeded by: Office Abolished

Chief of the Joint Staff
- In office 24 July 1952 – 21 August 1952
- Prime Minister: Mohammad Mosaddegh
- Preceded by: Abbas Garzan
- Succeeded by: Mahmoud Baharmast
- In office 23 September 1941 – 3 March 1943
- Prime Minister: Ali Mansur; Mohammad Ali Foroughi
- Preceded by: Azizollah Zarghami
- Succeeded by: Hasan Arfa

Minister of War
- In office 1 December 1951 – 27 July 1952
- Prime Minister: Mohammad Mosaddegh; Ahmad Qavam; Mohammad Mosaddegh
- Preceded by: Ali-Asghar Naghdi
- Succeeded by: Mohammad Mosaddegh
- In office 26 February 1950 – 2 July 1950
- Prime Minister: Mohammad Sa'ed; Ali Mansur; Ali Razmara
- Preceded by: Ahmad Amir-Ahmadi
- Succeeded by: Abdollah Hedayat
- In office 27 December 1947 – 22 June 1948
- Prime Minister: Ahmad Qavam; Ebrahim Hakimi; Abdolhossein Hazhir
- Preceded by: Ahmad Amir-Ahmadi
- Succeeded by: Ahmad Amir-Ahmadi

Minister of Roads
- In office 1949–1949
- Prime Minister: Mohammad Sa'ed
- Preceded by: Hamid Sayyah
- Succeeded by: ?

Personal details
- Born: 1888 Tehran, Qajar Iran
- Died: 1970 (aged 81–82) Tehran, Pahlavi Iran
- Party: Iran-e-No Party (1927)
- Spouse: Leyla Yazdanpanah
- Education: Cossack Cadet School

Military service
- Allegiance: Qajar Iran (1912–1925); Pahlavi Iran (1925–1967)
- Branch/service: Ground Force
- Years of service: 1912–1967
- Rank: Lieutenant general

Morteza Yazdanpanah (1888–1970) was an army officer who served as chief-of-staff in the Imperial Iranian army for two times, between 1941 and 1942 and in 1952. He also held other governmental and military positions during the reigns of Reza Shah and Mohammad Reza Pahlavi.

== Early life and education ==
Yazdanpanah was born in Tehran in 1888. His father was a colonel in the army.

From 1907 Morteza Yazdanpanah attended Cossack Cadet School which trained army officers for Cossack Brigade. He graduated from the school in 1912.

== Career and activities ==
Yazdanpanah was promoted to the rank of lieutenant colonel in 1919 and to the rank of colonel in 1920. He was one of the close allies of Reza Shah, but later their relations became tense. Yazdanpanah was the commander of the Iranian army's northern division during the coup organized by Reza Shah against Qajar dynasty in 1921. The same year he was promoted to brigadier general. During that period there were only six military officers who held this title in the army. He was also the governor general of Tehran and the commander of the first army.

In 1926 Yazdanpanah was next to Reza Shah during the latter's coronation ceremony. Yazdanpanah was one of the founders of Iran-e-No Party, a short-lived anticlerical political party, in 1927. The same year he was briefly arrested by Reza Shah. In 1928 he was made major general and chief inspector of the army, and next year he was appointed chief commander of the gendarme. However, he was removed from the post in 1930 and had no active office until 1932 when he was made inspector of infantry. He was appointed commander of the Tehran Cadet College in 1933.

Yazdanpanah was also assigned to significant posts by the next Shah, Mohammad Reza Pahlavi. He was promoted to the rank of lieutenant general in 1942 when Reza Shah went into exile. He headed the Iranian military contingent which represented the country at Victory Parade in London in June 1946.

On 4 April 1950 Yazdanpanah was named as the minister of war in the cabinet of Prime Minister Ali Mansur and remained in the office until June 1950 when a new cabinet was formed by Haj Ali Razmara. Yazdanpanah's successor as war minister was Abdollah Hedayat.

Yazdanpanah also served as the minister of war between December 1951 and June 1952 in the cabinet led by Prime Minister Mohammad Mosaddegh. Yazdanpanah was also chief of the army in 1952. Mosaddegh asked him to retire, but Yazdanpanah did not accept his request. Eventually, Yazdanpanah was dismissed from office and replaced by Mahmoud Baharmast in the post.

From June 1963 Yazdanpanah was one of the senior military advisors to Mohammad Reza Pahlavi being the head of the Imperial Inspectorate Organization and was also made a senator in 1967. He was the head of the High Council for the Coronation (Persian: Shura-yi ʿAli-yi Tajguzari) which organized the coronation ceremony of Mohammad Reza Pahlavi in 1967. He was one of ten people who had direct access to the Shah Mohammad Reza.

== Personal life and death ==
Yazdanpanah's wife, Leyla, was born in Russia, and her father was the governor of Russian Azarbaijan. Their son, Kambiz, pursued his graduate studies in foreign service at George Washington University. He married Golnar Bakhtiar, the daughter of Teymur Bakhtiar, in Tehran in October 1960.

Morteza Yazdanpanah died in 1970.
