= Ahmad Amir-Ahmadi =

Iranian military officer and politician (1884–1965)

Ahmad Amir-Ahmadi احمد امیراحمدی
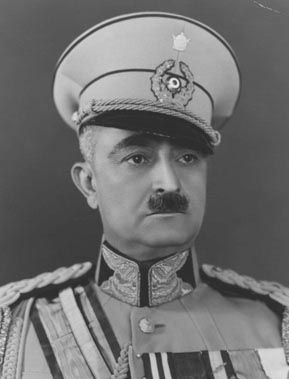

Member of the Iranian Senate
- In office 1949–1965

Minister of War
- In office 22 June 1948 – 26 February 1950
- Prime Minister: Abdolhossein Hazhir; Mohammad Sa'ed; Ali Mansur
- Preceded by: Morteza Yazdanpanah
- Succeeded by: Morteza Yazdanpanah
- In office 17 February 1946 – 27 December 1947
- Prime Minister: Ahmad Qavam; Ebrahim Hakimi
- Preceded by: Ali Riazi
- Succeeded by: Morteza Yazdanpanah
- In office December 23, 1942 – 28 March 1944
- Prime Minister: Ahmad Qavam; Ali Soheili
- Preceded by: Ahmad Qavam
- Succeeded by: Ebrahim Zand

Minister of Interior
- In office 20 March 1948 – 22 June 1948
- Preceded by: Farajollah Aqouli
- Succeeded by: Khalil Fahimi
- In office 4 December 1941 – 7 July 1942
- Preceded by: Amanullah Jahanbani
- Succeeded by: Seyyed Mehdi Farrokh

Commander of the Iranian Gendarmerie
- In office March 1925 – May 1929
- Preceded by: Sardar Rifat
- Succeeded by: Ali Tofiqi

Personal details
- Born: 1884 Tehran, Sublime State of Persia
- Died: 25 November 1965 (aged 81) Tehran, Imperial State of Iran
- Education: Kazakhkhaneh officer school
- Awards: Order of Zolfaghar Order of Saint Anna
- Nickname(s): "Ahmad the Butcher" "The Butcher of Luristan"

Military service
- Allegiance: Qajar Iran (1898–1925); Pahlavi Iran (1925–1949)
- Branch/service: Ground Force
- Years of service: 1898–1949
- Rank: Lieutenant general
- Commands: Northwestern Division; Western Division
- Battles/wars: Persian Constitutional Revolution; World War I; Persian campaign; Kurdish separatism in Iran; Simko Shikak revolt (1918–1922); Simko Shikak revolt (1926); Luri tribal insurgency in Pahlavi Iran; 1921 Persian coup d'état; World War II; Anglo-Soviet invasion of Iran; Iran crisis of 1946

Lieutenant General Ahmad Amir-Ahmadi (Persian: احمد امیراحمدی; 1884–1965) was an Iranian military officer and politician who played a major role in the rise of the Pahlavi dynasty and later served as a cabinet Minister in Iran during the 1940s and 1950s.

== Biography ==
Born in 1884 in Tehran, of an aristocratic Persian family, he joined the military and rose through the ranks, eventually becoming one of the leaders of the 1921 Persian coup d'état of Reza Pahlavi, Colonel Mohammad Taqi Pessian, his brother-in-law General Heydaygholi Pessian and Seyyed Zia'eddin Tabatabaee against the Qajar dynasty. He became the first person to receive the rank of "sepahbod" (corps general or lieutenant general) under Reza Shah Pahlavi. He and his brother-in-law Heydargholli Pessian had planned to create a more democratic Iran but he later told his sister that 'the British would not allow it'. Amir-Ahmadi was described as the only man that Reza Shah truly respected and feared.

Reza Shah tasked him with quelling the Luri tribal insurgency in Pahlavi Iran. He was also known by the Lur's as “The Butcher of Luristan”. William O. Douglas had met Amir Ahmadi at a garden party in Tehran, and described him as "stocky and erect, and shows the age of a man in his early sixties. He has a fierce black mustache, piercing eyes, and prominent gold teeth. He speaks Persian, Russian, and Turkish. Trained in the Cossack Army in Russia, he still bears some of the marks of its arrogance and daring. It was reflected in a lucid moment of idle conversation." When Amir Ahmadi was asked about his relations with the Lurs after the conflict, he stated "they think highly of me, I am a household word. Why in Luristan if a child cries the mother says, 'hush or Amir Ahmadi will get you?'"

He served as Minister of War in the cabinet of Ali Soheili in 1942, and Abdolhossein Hazhir in 1948. Following the departure of Reza Shah from Iran, Amir-Ahmadi became the minister of interior in Foroughi's cabinet, and then in Qavam-os-saltaneh and Soheili's cabinets he was the minister of war. Military governor of Tehran, commandant of the central garrison and the inspector of army were among his many responsibilities. After his retirement he entered the Senate as an appointed senator. He died of cancer in 1965.

== See also ==
- Pahlavi dynasty
- Amir Abdollah Tahmasebi
- Mohammad-Hosayn Ayrom
- Abdolhossein Teymourtash
- Karim Buzarjomehri
- Mahmud Khan Puladeen
- Amanullah Jahanbani
- Mohammad Taqi Pessian
- Bahram Aryana
