= Jahanshah Saleh =

Iranian physician and politician (1905–1995)

- جهانشاه صالح
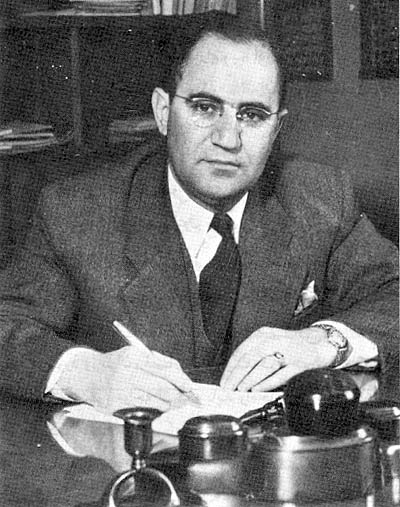

Minister of Health
- In office 1950 – March 1951
- Monarch: Mohammad Reza Pahlavi
- Prime Minister: Haj Ali Razmara; Hossein Ala'
- Preceded by: Mohammad Ali Varasteh

Personal details
- Born: 1905 Kashan, Qajar Iran
- Died: 1995 (aged 89–90) Tehran, Iran
- Education: Columbia University; Syracuse University
- Occupation: Physician

Jahanshah Saleh (1905–1995) was an Iranian physician and politician. He served as health minister and education minister in the 1950s and 1960s. He was the obstetrician of Queen Farah Diba, spouse of Shah Mohammad Reza Pahlavi.

== Early life and education ==
Saleh was born in Kashan in 1905. He obtained a degree in obstetrics and gynecology from Columbia University, the US. He received further education at Syracuse University in the USA on gynecology. He graduated from the university in 1934 and returned to Iran.

== Career ==
Saleh worked at the faculty of medicine in Tehran and was promoted to the title of associate professor. Later he became professor of gynecology. In 1936 he was appointed instructional head of the newly founded nursing school in Tehran. He headed the surgery department of women at Vaziri Hospital and also headed the midwifery school. He also worked at the Women's Hospital which was later renamed Jahanshah Saleh Hospital. In 1948 Saleh was appointed dean of the faculty of medicine at the University of Tehran.

Saleh was the health minister in the cabinet led by Haj Ali Razmara in the period 1950–1951. Saleh remained in office in the next cabinet formed by Hossein Ala'. In the cabinet formed by Fazlollah Zahedi after the 1953 coup against Prime Minister Mohammad Mosaddegh Saleh was also appointed minister of health in August 1953.

Saleh served as the obstetrician of Farah Pahlavi. He accompanied her during the birth of Prince Reza Cyrus Pahlavi in 1960. Saleh was appointed minister of education in the cabinet formed by Jafar Sharif-Emami in March 1961. In 1966 he was serving as the president of the University of Tehran.

== Later years and death ==
Saleh was not only interested in medicine, but also in environmental protection. He was one of the Iranians who reported concerns over the quality of air in the cities. Initially his views were not taken into consideration, but in 1963 the Supreme Council of City Safety stated that air in the capital city, Tehran, was not healthy. Saleh died in Tehran in 1995.
