= Government of Hossein Ala' (1951) =

Imperial Iran's government between March and April 1951

- 34th Cabinet of Pahlavi Iran
- Date formed: 20 March 1951
- Date dissolved: 27 April 1951

People and organisations
- Head of state: Mohammad Reza Pahlavi
- Head of government: Hossein Ala'
- Opposition party: National Front
- Opposition leader: Mohammad Mosaddegh

History
- Advice and consent: 17 April 1951
- Predecessor: Government of Haj Ali Razmara
- Successor: Government of Mohammad Mosaddegh

The cabinet led by Hossein Ala' was formed on 20 March 1951 two weeks after the assassination of Prime Minister Haj Ali Razmara. The cabinet was given vote of confidence at the Majlis on 17 April 1951. However, the tenure of the cabinet was very short and lasted only until 27 April when Hossein Ala' resigned from office due to threats of the Fada'iyan-e Islam members who had murdered Haj Ali Razmara. Another reason for the resignation of the cabinet was the ratification of the oil nationalization bill. It was succeeded by the cabinet formed by Mohammad Mosaddegh in late April.

== Cabinet members ==
The cabinet consisted of the following members:

| Portfolio | Minister | Took office | Left office | Party |
|---|---|---|---|---|
| Prime Minister | Hossein Ala' | 20 March 1951 | 27 April 1951 | |
| Minister of Foreign Affairs | Hossein Ala' | 20 March 1951 | 4 April 1951 | |
| Minister of Foreign Affairs | Abdollah Entezam | 4 April 1951 | 27 April 1951 | |
| Minister of War | Ali-Asghar Naghdi | 20 March 1951 | 27 April 1951 | Military |
| Minister of Agriculture | Etzia Olmolk | 20 March 1951 | 27 April 1951 | |
| Minister of Posts and Telegraphs | Ahmed Zanageh | 20 March 1951 | 27 April 1951 | |
| Minister of Finance | Mohammad Ali Varasteh | 20 March 1951 | 27 April 1951 | |
| Minister of Education | Habibollah Amuzegar | 20 March 1951 | 27 April 1951 | |
| Minister of Justice | Shamseddin Amir-Alaei | 20 March 1951 | 27 April 1951 | |
| Minister of State | Ali Dashti | 20 March 1951 | 27 April 1951 | |
