= Ebrahim Zand =

Iranian politician (1888–1974)

Minister of War
- In office 28 March 1944 – 22 September 1944
- Prime Minister: Ali Soheili; Mohammad Sa'ed
- Preceded by: Ahmad Amir-Ahmadi
- Succeeded by: Mohammad Hossein Mirza Firouz
- In office 26 November 1944 – 4 November 1945
- Prime Minister: Morteza-Qoli Bayat
- Preceded by: Abdollah Hedayat
- Succeeded by: Ali Riazi

Governor of Kerman
- In office September 1947 – January 1949

Governor of Isfahan
- In office 1949 – January 1949

Minister of Interior
- In office February 1950 – April 1950
- Preceded by: Manouchehr Eghbal
- Succeeded by: Ezz-ol-Mamalek Ardalan

Governor of Azerbaijan
- In office May 1950 – 1950

CEO of Bank Melli Iran
- In office July 1950 – September 1951
- Preceded by: Abol Hassan Ebtehaj
- Succeeded by: Ali Asghar Nasser

Ambassador to Italy
- In office Early 1950s – ?

Personal details
- Born: 1888 Tehran, Qajar Iran
- Died: 1974 (aged 85–86) Pahlavi Iran
- Education: Saint Petersburg State University Faculty of Law

Ebrahim Zand (Persian: ابراهیم زند; 1888–1974) was an Iranian politician.

Zand received his primary education in Tehran and went to Russia to continue his education. He entered the St. Petersburg School of Law and received a college degree there. In 1920, after returning to Iran, he entered the State Department. He became the Director General of the Ministry of Agriculture and was appointed Minister of War for 5 times. Between 1950 and 1951, he was the governor of Bank Melli Iran, Iran's central bank at that time. Then he served as governor of Isfahan, and was succeeded in this post by Mohammad Ali Keshavarz Sadr.

He was also the Iranian ambassador to Turkey, Italy and Spain.
