= Ali-Asghar Naghdi =

Iranian military officer (1895–1966)

Minister of War
- In office 6 May 1961 – 30 September 1963
- Prime Minister: Jafar Sharif-Emami; Ali Amini; Asadollah Alam
- Preceded by: Ahmad Wosouq
- Succeeded by: Asadollah Sanii
- In office 8 April 1951 – 1 December 1951
- Prime Minister: Hossein Ala'; Mohammad Mosaddegh
- Preceded by: Abdollah Hedayat
- Succeeded by: Morteza Yazdanpanah

Personal details
- Born: 1895 Tehran, Iran
- Died: 1966 (aged 70–71)
- Education: Kazakhkhaneh officer school

Military service
- Allegiance: Qajar Iran (1912–1925); Pahlavi Iran (1925–1966)
- Branch/service: Ground Force
- Years of service: 1912–1966
- Rank: Lieutenant general
- Commands: 2nd Central Division several brigades in Tehran; Khuzestan Brigade several infantry regiments

Ali-Asghar Naghdi (Persian: علی‌اصغر نقدی; 1895–1966) was an Imperial Army general and served as the minister of defense in the governments of Hossein Ala', Mohammad Mosaddegh, Jafar Sharif-Emami, Ali Amini and Asadollah Alam.

== Early life ==
After completing his secondary education in the seminaries of the Qajar and Dar al-Fonun schools, he entered the Kazakhkhaneh school and passed the course. He achieved the rank of officer and often participated in internal conflicts and showed great courage. Therefore, he received his ranks quickly and reached the rank of colonel, and he was very close to Reza Khan, and he was a companion in traveling and attending. In 1912, he was sent to Europe by the army. He returned to Iran and commanded several infantry regiments. In 1931, he was in charge of commanding the Khuzestan Brigade, and after that he was the commander of several brigades in Tehran.

== Minister of war ==
Naghdi was named as the minister of war in Hossein Ala's cabinet in March 1951. He became a lieutenant general in April 1951. In the first cabinet of Mohammad Mossadegh he was also the minister of war. However, his tenure did not last long, and he retired from the army. When the Imperial Inspectorate was established, he was elected deputy governor. In 1960, in the reshuffle of Jafar Sharif-Emami's cabinet, he returned to the cabinet as the minister of war. In the government headed by the Prime Minister Ali Amini, he was also the minister of war. In the first cabinet of Asadollah Alam he served in the same post. He was replaced by his deputy in a cabinet reshuffle. He died in 1966.
