= Varasteh =

Varasteh is a surname of Persian origin. Notable people with the surname include:

- Manshour Varasteh, Iranian political scientist
- Mohammad Ali Varasteh (1896–1989), Iranian politician
- Nima Varasteh (1978-2014), Iranian musician and composer
