= Government of Haj Ali Razmara =

Imperial Iran's government between June 1950 and March 1951

Government of Ali Razmara
- 33rd Cabinet of Pahlavi Iran

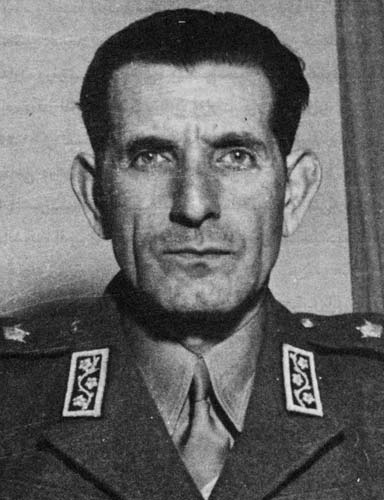
- Prime Minister Ali Razmara
- Date formed: 26 June 1950
- Date dissolved: 11 March 1951

People and organisations
- Head of state: Mohammad Reza Pahlavi
- Head of government: Ali Razmara
- Total no. of members: 10
- Opposition party: National Front
- Opposition leader: Mohammad Mosaddegh

History
- Advice and consent: 4 July 1950; 10 July 1950
- Predecessor: Government of Ali Mansur
- Successor: Government of Hossein Ala'

The cabinet led by Haj Ali Razmara was formed on 26 June 1950 and succeeded the cabinet led by Ali Mansur who was in office between April and June 1950. Razmara was a lieutenant general at the imperial army and was serving as the chief of the general staff when he was appointed by the Shah Mohammad Reza Pahlavi as the prime minister. It was the 33rd and first military cabinet in Iran since 1924. Behrooz Moazami also argues that it was one of the cabinets which did not follow the political agenda of the Shah in addition to the cabinets of Mohammad Mosaddegh and those of Ahmad Qavam in the Pahlavi rule. The Razmara cabinet ended on 11 March 1951 three days after the assassination of the prime minister.

== Consent and opposition ==
Razmara planned to present his cabinet to the Majlis on 27 June, but he could not because of the protests of the National Front members, including Mohammad Mosaddegh, Mozzafar Baghai and Hossein Makki. Eventually, the cabinet was confirmed by the Majlis on 4 July 1950 receiving 97 votes in favor against 7 votes. It was also given a vote of confidence by the Iranian Senate on 10 July albeit with protests of the senators such as Ahmad Matin-Daftari, Mohammad Tadayyon, Hossein Dadgar, Mahmoud Hessabi, and Abdol Hossein Nikpour.

Prime Minister Haj Ali Razmara and his cabinet were frequently attacked by the members of National Front led by Mohammad Mosaddegh due to the cabinet's opposition to the nationalization of oil. Another source for the criticisms against the cabinet was the establishment of a central trade company. The bazaar members thought that the cabinet would create a controlled economy which would constraint their commercial activities. Theis negative approach soon caused nationwide protests. Although the opposition forces supported the nationalization of the oil, the cabinet did not advocate this proposal arguing that it was not a practical move. On 3 March 1951 a report on this issue was submitted by the Prime Minister Razmara to the Majlis special oil committee. The report was made public soon which led to the assassination of the Prime Minister and eventually, the end of the cabinet.

== List of ministers ==
The cabinet was consisted of the following ten members:

Portfolio	Minister	Took office	Left office	Party
Prime Minister	Ali Razmara	26 June 1950	March 1951	Military
Minister of War	Abdollah Hedayat	26 June 1950	March 1951	Military
Minister of Foreign Affairs	Mahmud Salahi	26 June 1950	18 July 1950	
Minister of Foreign Affairs	Mohsen Rais	18 July 1950	March 1951	
Minister of Agriculture	Ibrahim Mahdavi	26 June 1950	March 1951	
Minister of Interior	Fayzollah Bahrami	26 June 1950	March 1951	
Minister of Labor	Mohammad Nakhai	26 June 1950	28 August 1950	
Minister of Labor	Gholam Hossein Foruhar	28 August 1950	March 1951	
Minister of Finance	Taqi Nasr	26 June 1950	24 October 1950	
Minister of Finance	Gholam Hossein Foruhar	24 October 1950	13 January 1951	
Minister of Health	Jahanshah Saleh	26 June 1950	March 1951	
Minister of Education	Shamseddin Jazairi	26 June 1950	March 1951	
Minister of National Economy	Morteza Azmudeh	26 June 1950	24 October 1950	
Minister of National Economy	Abdullah Dafteri	24 October 1950	March 1951	

=== Reshuffles ===
The cabinet saw several reshuffles. Mahmud Salahi was appointed acting foreign minister to the cabinet and replaced by Mohsen Rais on 18 July 1950. Mohammad Nakhai who was appointed as labor minister was removed from the office on 28 August, and his successor was Gholam Hussain Foruhar. On 3 October Taqi Nasr, minister of finance, resigned from the post which was accepted by the prime minister on the same day. On 24 October Gholam Hussain Foruhar was named as finance minister, and Abdullah Dafteri replaced Morteza Azmudeh as minister of national economy. Foruhar resigned from post of finance minister on 13 January 1951.

== End and next cabinet ==
The prime minister was assassinated by a member of the Fada'iyan-e Islam, Khalil Tahmasebi, in Tehran on 7 March 1951. The cabinet was led by acting Prime Minister Khalil Fatemi until 11 March. Although the Shah planned to appoint him to the post, due to the opposition of the National Front he could not materialize his plan, and Hossein Ala' was named as the prime minister on 11 March. However, the cabinet of Hossein Ala' lasted only until 27 April when he resigned from office due to threats of the Fada'iyan-e Islam members and the ratification of the oil nationalization bill.
