= Luri tribal insurgency in Pahlavi Iran =

Military conflict in Iran in the 1920s and 1930s

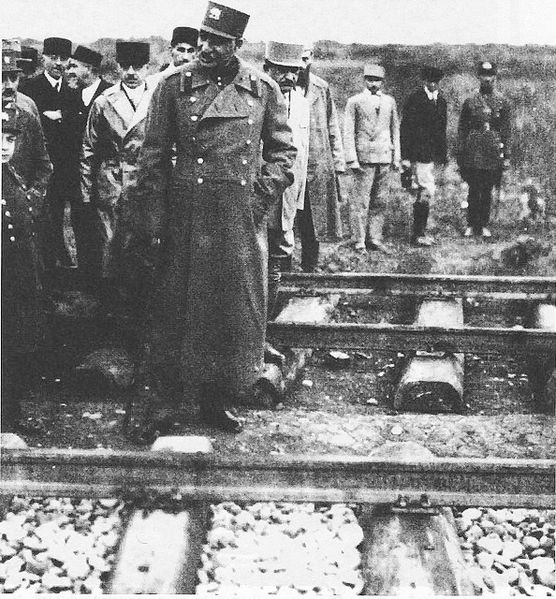
- Reza Shah inaugurating a railway station in Lorestan
Date	1921–1933 (main phase: 1922–1928), some sporadic revolts after
Location	Lur-populated regions of Iran (specifically in Lorestan, Khuzestan, Chaharmahal and Bakhtiari, Kohgiluyeh and Boyerahmad, and Fars provinces)
Result	Iranian victory
Territorial changes	Establishment of direct Iranian state control

Belligerents
Qajar Iran (until 1925); Pahlavi Iran (after 1925); Pro-government tribes	Tribes of Lorestan: Tribes of Bala Gariva; Lak tribes; Supported by: Simko Shikak's forces Vali dynasty Bakhtiari tribes Kuhgilu and Mamasani tribes

Commanders and leaders
Reza Shah; Ahmad Amir-Ahmadi (WIA); Mohammad Reza Pahlavi; Hasan Arfa; Jafar-Quli Khan Bakhtiari; Mohammad Shahbakhti	Simko Shikak; Qadam Kheyr; Lohrasp Batoli †; Mardan Khan (executed); Ali Khan Beyranvand (surrendered) (executed); Hussein Khan Beyranvand (surrendered) (executed); Sartip Khan Buyir Ahmadi (surrendered)

The Luri tribal insurgency in Pahlavi Iran was a series of military campaigns against several Lur tribes by the Iranian army under Reza Shah, who was initially the Minister of War for the Qajar government and later established the Pahlavi government. The campaign brought the Lurs, who had traditionally been nomadic pastoralists outside the control of the Iranian government, under direct Iranian control.

== Background ==
Throughout Iranian history, the Lur regions were largely outside of Iranian government control and controlled by the local Lur tribes. Before 1900, the majority of Lurs were nomadic pastoralists. By 1907, Luristan was completely out of state control and under local tribes, such as the Baharvand, Biranvand, Chagani, Judaki, Papi, Qalavand, Sagvand, and Salsalah. Qajar authorities were not allowed to enter. Each tribe and its land were an autonomous polity and all social, legal and political problems were settled within the tribe. The tribes did not unite to form a confederacy, nor was there any organized separatist movement, as the Lurs did not have a concept of nation. The tribes were primarily interested in themselves, clashing with the Iranian state and rival tribes alike. There was historically never any nationalist or separatist movement among the Lurs like there was among the Kurds and Baloch. The main reason was that the Lurs were Shia Muslim, like the majority of Iran, and also lacked ethnic or tribal connections outside of Iran.

According to Ervand Abrahamian, by the time the Anglo-Russian Convention was signed in 1907, Iran was largely lawless and there was a split between the government in Tehran which contributed to the chaos in Iran. The Bakhtiaris were rapidly gaining power and influence, which led to the Boyerahmadi, Qashqais, Arabs, Baloch, and Khamseh to form an alliance to curb the Bakhtiari growth. Meanwhile, the Kurdish tribes of Luristan stopped paying taxes and began looting and disrupting communication lines. There were some Kurds in Luristan including the Lak tribes in the north and other Kurdish tribes in among the Feyli in Posht-e-Kuh. The Bakhtiaris also rapidly gained prominence across Iran in 1909 after declaring that they joined the Persian Constitutional Revolution, which went on from 1905 to 1911. The Bakhtiaris held many powerful positions, and the anti-Bakhtiari alliance began to view the Persian Constitutional Revolution as a cover for Bakhtiari domination. The anti-Bakhtiari alliance prepared an attack in which Sheikh Khazal would advance on Mohammerah, the Baluch on Kerman, Boyerahmadis on Bushehr, and the Qashqais and Khamseh on Shiraz. Even the clergy had turned against the Bakhtiaris. The Bakhtiaris retained their powerful positions as the anti-Bakhtiari alliance quickly dissolved due to tribal rivalries, with the Baluchis fighting among themselves, the Arabs of Sheikh Khazal losing their cohesion, the Kohgiluyeh-Boyerahmadi failing to coordinate and not capturing any towns, and the Qashqais and Khamseh turning against each other in Shiraz.

In 1912, Salar-od-Dowleh, brother of Mohammad Ali Shah Qajar, attempted to seize the Qajar throne by recruiting tribal warriors from Kurds and Lurs. Although Salar-od-Dowleh was quickly defeated in Hamadan in May 1912, the revolt encouraged Kurds and Lurs to further rebel against the Iranian government, and their regions remained unstable, with control of cities very often shifting back and forth between the government and rebellious tribes. The weakness of the Iranian military was further exacerbated by the deployment of troops to fight Simko Shikak. According to Claudius Rich, the Kurdish Jaff tribe protected sections of all tribes of Iranian Kurdistan and Luristan.

== History ==
Immediately after becoming Minister of War in 1921, Reza Shah launched several campaigns against the Lur tribes, aiming to settle them, detribalize them, and bring them under direct state control. The 1920s and 1930s were full of conflict between the Lurs and the Iranian government. Among the campaigns of Reza Shah were separate campaigns against the tribes of Lorestan, the Bakhtiari tribes, and the Boyer-Ahmadi and Mamasani tribes. Furthermore, the borderlands between the Lur tribes were historically dangerous and turbulent, as there were frequent clashes between the Luristani and Bakhtiari tribes, and between the Bakhtiari and Kuhgilu tribes. Unlike the Bakhtiari confederation which had an established hierarchal structure, the Lur tribes of Lorestan did not form a confederation and their leaders only exerted limited influence.

=== Luristan campaign ===
By early March 1922, Iran was ready to confront the Kurdish rebels, first defeating the rebel leader Rasheed Khan in Ravansar in March 1923, afterwards he fled to Turkey, but was pardoned and returned to Iran where he revolted again in June 1923, and was defeated in April 1924. The Iranian army heavily relied on Rasheed Khan's Kurdish rivals to defeat him. As Simko rapidly grew his region, he boosted the morale of the Kurdish tribes, who increasingly accepted his authority. Simko called on the Lurs to join his revolt, and received Lur support. In addition to his main support base of the Shikak, Herki, Mamash, Mangur, Dehbokri, Piran, Zarza, Gewrik, Feyzullabegi, Pizhdar, and the smaller tribes around Baneh, Simko was supported by several Lur tribes as far as southern Luristan. In summer 1922, when Simko declared an open revolt against Iran and captured Maragheh, the Lurs joined Simko and revolted in Luristan. Reza Shah initially was unable to suppress the Lurs due to the intensity of the war against Simko. In spring 1922, after weakening Simko, Reza Shah led a bloody campaign against the Lur tribes which supported Simko, and initially failed, although he subdued them by summer. In 1924, Reza Shah had recruited Kurdish tribal irregulars to fight against Simko Shikak, and some of them were sent to fight the Vali of Posht-e-Kuh later the same year. A year earlier, Reza Shah had used the Kalhors to help fight the Lurs when he realized the difficulty of the campaign. Simko Shikak and the Vali of Posht-e-Kuh were both defeated and fled to Iraq. However, in 1926, Simko had returned to Iran and revolted again as the Iranian army was busy suppressing another revolt by the Lurs. Simko was killed in 1930. With the main defeat of Simko in 1922, the Iranian government consolidated control over Kurdistan, although sporadic revolts continued and some areas temporarily fell to Kurdish rebels from time to time until 1931 when it stabilized. By 1935, the Kurdistan Brigade of the Iranian army had upgraded to an entire division. When Simko was defeated in 1922, the pro-Simko Luri rebels were deported to other parts of Iran along with the Kurdish rebels. However, the Lur revolts were not as politically dangerous as the Kurdish ones.

Reza Khan became Minister of War in February 1921 and instantly came into conflict with the Lurs. The Iranian army first deployed to Luristan in April 1921, planning to connect Luristan to Khuzestan by road. After intense fighting, the Iranian army captured Boroujerd in October 1923, and Khorramabad by late November. In spring 1922, as the Iranian army under Amir Ahmadi dispatched to Luristan, the people of Boroujerd and Khorramabad were anxious to see the establishment of a powerful state to counter the tribes. The tribes of Tarhan were under Nazar Ali Khan Amir Ashraf, the Selseleh were under Mehr Ali Khan Amir Monazam, the Sagvand were divided into two rival branches led by Ali Khani and Rahim Khani, while the Beyranvand were under Asad Khani, Haydar Khani, Ali Mohammadi, and Mohammad Khani, the tribes of Bala Gariva, such as Baharvand, Judaki, Mir, Qalavand, and Papi, were each under their own leader, same with the Chegini tribe. The Mir tribe of Saimara were affiliated to the Vali dynasty of Posht e Kuh and its leaders were competing amongst each other. The Beyranvand were described as the most troublesome tribe which did most of the actual combat against the Iranian army. Lur tribes were generally disunited and hostile to each other, and there were many instances of Lur tribe leaders siding with the Iranian army only to weaken their rival tribe leaders or to take revenge, even if it meant their own demise. This had allowed the Iranian army to enforce the divide and conquer tactic. The Lurs had a reputation for treachery, lawlessness, and incessant feuding due to their history of intertribal conflicts encouraged by tribe leaders. The west and northwest of Luristan province was controlled by the Amra'i tribe, while the Baharvand, Biranvand, Chagani, Judaki, Papi, Qalavand, Sagvand, and Silsilah each had their own lands which operated independently.

Amir Ahmadi swore on the Quran that Ali Khan and Hussein Khan of the Beyranvand tribe would not be killed if they were captured, but were nevertheless killed. The Selseleh tribe leaders were hung alongside the Beyranvand despite siding with the army against the Beyranvand. This had destroyed any remaining trust the Lurs had in the government. The Iranian army had acted on the "traditional Qajar treacheries", as the Qajars had commonly used that tactic, notably against Jafar Agha.

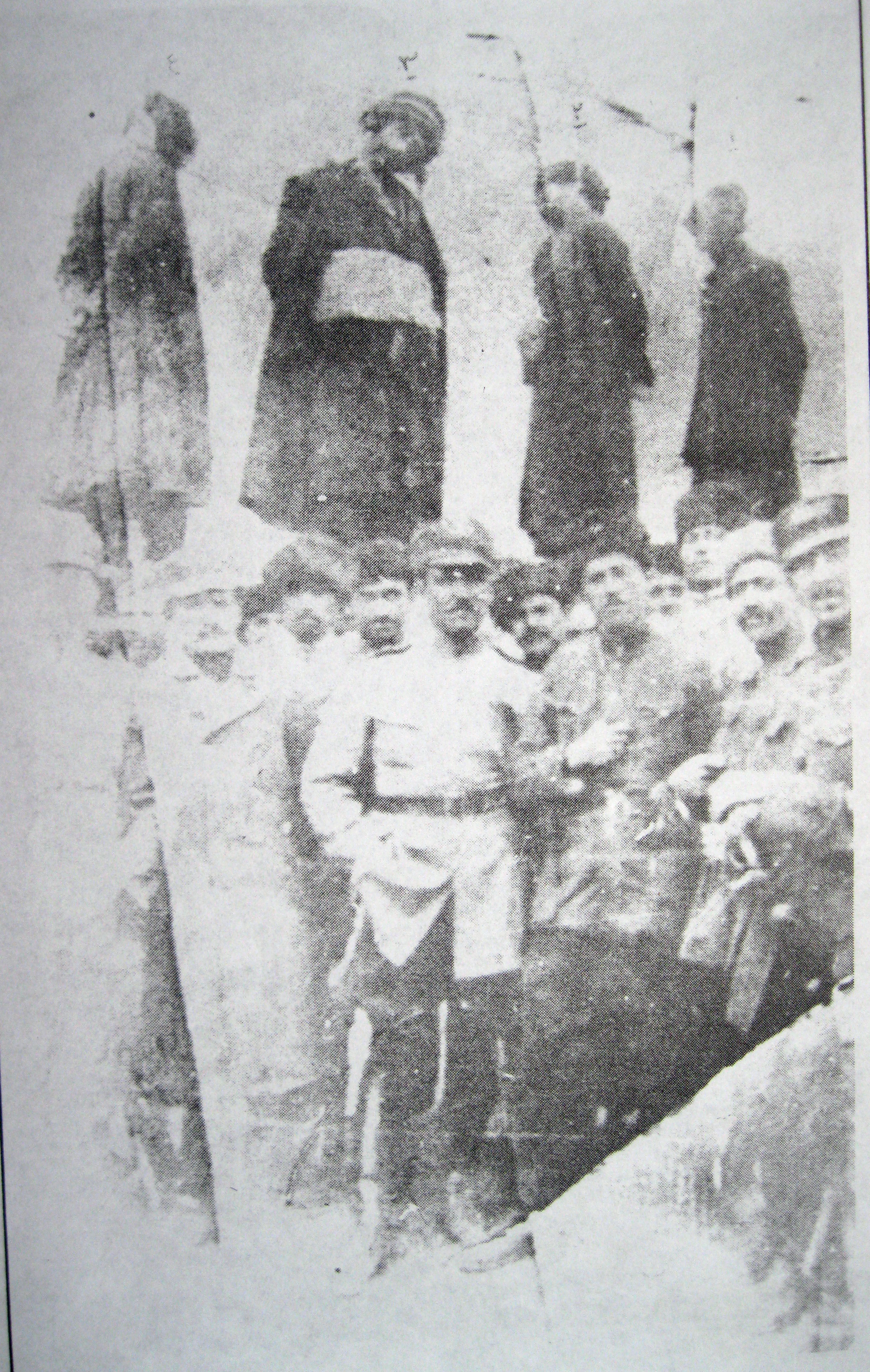
Iranian soldiers executing Beyranvand and Hasanvand tribal chiefs in Khorramabad (1922–1923)

There was another wave of fighting after an Iranian soldier had approached a newly married Lur girl from the Romani tribe and her husband shot him dead. General Shah Bakhti sent Colonel Fuladi to punish them. The Romani, joined by the Chegini, who had often been mistreated by the army, defeated the army in Khorramabad. Upon seeing their victory, the Beyranvand, Baharvand, Papi, and half of the Judaki joined the revolt, attacking the army in the vicinity of Khorramabad in May 1924. However, the Lur control over Khorramabad was disrupted after a dispute between the tribes over a captured Iranian cannon, causing the Baharvand to withdraw, followed by the Papi, Judaki, and Chegini, leaving only the Beyranvand who were quickly defeated. In June 1924, Reza Shah sent warplanes to bombard the Luri rebels, and himself headed to Luristan to defeat the Luri tribes and advance southwards towards Sheikh Khazal. The American filmmaker Merian C. Cooper, who was in Luristan at the time, in 1924, wrote that "daily the fighting becomes more bitter there. Two weeks ago the Persian Governor-General of Luristan invited twelve leading khans to a conference, pledging security. Upon their arrival he hung all twelve up in a row in the public square. Now the Lurs are besieging his capital, boiling alive all of his officers they catch, it is said, and awaiting, apparently undismayed, the army that is filing down through the valleys of Kurdistan to raise the siege." When Khorramabad was taken by the Lurs, Reza Shah dispatched a force under Ahmad Amir-Ahmadi, which captured the town and immediately hung eighty of the Lur leaders, proceeded to massacre Lur women and children at the nearby camp, and forced captive Lur men to jump off a cliff.

In October 1925, Reza Shah declared the end of the Qajar dynasty, which had a long conflict with the Lurs, and announced the beginning of the Pahlavi dynasty on December 13, 1925. His goals were to establish a modern centralized and unified nation state. In Luristan, the urbanists of Khorramabad, including landlords and merchants, had actually supported Reza Shah as the absence of the state had resulted in tribal supremacy and the urbanists lost political power, while the tribal leaders were skeptical of state power as it meant the end of tribal autonomy. The coronation of Reza Shah in 1925 sparked many simultaneous tribal revolts across Iran, many of which were Luri revolts.

The last major engagement in Luristan was in 1926 between the tribes of Tarhan and the Iranian army, and the only reason the tribes of Tarhan were defeated was due to the tribes of Bala Gariva refusing to support them. The Iranian government used tribes against one another, and in one instance, when the Beyranvand tribe killed 101 Iranian soldiers in 1927, the Iranian government convinced their rival Selseleh tribe to bring them to justice, which they did, although the Selseleh were nevertheless attacked by the Iranian government as a message to all the Lur tribes. The Vali dynasty of Posht e Kuh, which ruled from the 16th century until 1928, while being a Luri dynasty ruling over a mostly Luri domain, also had a significant Kurdish domain, and the capital city Husseinabad (Ilam) had a special enclosed section dedicated to the Vali and his closest Kurdish tribe leaders and best soldiers, consisting of three hundred black tents, as noted by Layard on his visit in 1840. Hasan Arfa summarized the campaign against the Vali dynasty, stating that "the Lurs retreated towards the Kabir Kuh, into the Posht-Kuh region situated between the Kabir Kuh chain and the Iraqi frontier, controlled by Abu Gaddareh, the Vali of Posht-Kuh, chief of the Posht-Kuhi Lurs and hereditary Governor of that district, which had up to then never been occupied by the forces of the Central Government. The Vali, who was secretly encouraging the Lurs to revolt and providing them with rifles and ammunition smuggled from Iraq, proposed to the Government that he would bring this revolt to an end if he were allowed to keep his position and were entrusted with the governorship of Pish Kuh beside his own. The Government not having had time to concentrate forces in Luristan, negotiated with the Vali to gain time, meanwhile concentrating the forces which had been released by the pacification and disarmament of the Kurds into the Pish Kuh region, preliminary to a drive towards Posht Kuh and the definitive pacification of both sides of Luristan. Ultimately, in 1928, Government forces penetrated into Posht-Kuh coming from the north, and occupied the whole region up to the frontier. The Vali fled to Iraq." The tribes of Luristan were officially defeated in 1928 and stopped fighting. The Iranian government built the road between Luristan and Khuzestan. Some Beyranvand continued to fight. In 1928, Iran had achieved its goal of opening the highway between Luristan and Khuzestan.

In Luristan, the main Luri tribal insurgents belonged to the Beyranvand, Sagvand, Papi, and Chegini tribes. The main phase of the conflict between Reza Shah and the Lurs was from 1922 to 1928. Reza Shah brought Luristan under direct control in 1928, ending 744 years of independent Lur rule over Luristan (the Atabeks of Lur-e-Kuchak from 1184 to 1597, and the Vali dynasty from 1597 to 1928).

Reza Shah equated nomadic pastoralism to barbarianism in a March 1924 speech in Luristan. The conquest of Luristan was very important for Reza Shah for many reasons. First, Luristan was in a state of anarchy, completely out of state control but without a unified governing body. Second, the pacification of Luristan paved the way for the pacification of Khuzestan. Third, Luristan was vital for trade, as the road through Luristan was the shortest road connecting the Persian Gulf to the center of Iran. Fourth, the previous attempts by the Qajars to capture Luristan had repeatedly resulted in defeat, and therefore Reza Shah wanted to show the vitality and superiority of his new regime by conquering Luristan.

=== Kohgiluyeh campaign ===
In June 1929, the Qashqai tribes revolted against the Pahlavi government, beginning the Persian tribal uprisings of 1929. The uprising, while beginning among the Qashqai of western Fars province, grew to include all tribes of Fars, such as Lurs (Bakhtiaris, Boyerahmadis, and Mamasanis), and the Khamseh, and engulfed all of Fars province. By 1930, the Boyerahmadi Lurs in Fars province were the only ones who continued to revolt against the government, while the Bakhtiaris, Mamasanis, Qashqais, and Khamseh had been subdued. The Boyerahmadis were led by Sartip Khan Boyerahmadi. Sardar Assad gathered a large contingent of Bakhtiari tribesmen for the operation against the Boyerahmadi. Sawlat al-Dawlah Qashqai also provided a large group of his fighters. During the battle of Tang-e Tamuradi alone, the Boyerahmadi Lurs killed over 1,000 Iranian soldiers and Qashqai tribesmen. Tang-e Tamuradi was nicknamed "Tang-e Sarbazkosh" by the local Lurs. The Iranian army eventually defeated the Boyerahmadi Lurs. The Iranian victory against the Boyerahmadi had largely relied on the Bakhtiari and Qashqai troops. In 1931, Sartip Khan was defeated and was pardoned after coming to Tehran and surrendering. By 1931, all Lur tribes had been suppressed with the defeat of the Boyerahmadi Lurs. The central government had asserted control over Iran entirely. By 1933, all fighting between the Lurs and Iranian government had ceased.

=== Bakhtiari campaign ===
In 1923, Reza Shah, aware of the intensity of Bakhtiari internal feuds, sought and gained the support of Sardar Assad, a Bakhtiari tribal chief. Sardar Assad Bakhtiari and his entire clan were generously rewarded for their defection to the Iranian government and were advantaged over rival clans. This had weakened the Bakhtiari tribal cohesion. On November 28, 1933, Sardar Assad Bakhtiari, as well as other Luri tribe leaders and former rebels who surrendered and were pardoned, including Mamasani and Boyerahmadi and several Bakhtiari leaders, were suddenly arrested in a large arrest campaign. The event was known as "the Bakhtiari plot" and resulted in the executions of: Sardar Fatih Muhammad Riza Khan, a Bakhtiari chief who led the 1929 Bakhtiari uprising in the Garmsir; Muhammad Javad Khan Sardar Iqbal, who led the rebels in Shahr-e Kord; Ali Mardan Khan Chahar Lang, who entered a coalition with the Haft Lang, fought against the army in Safid Dasht, refused to submit after the rebels surrendered, with his activities initiating a second army operation under Colonel Mahdi Quli Khan Tajbaksh; Agha Gurdaz Ahmad Khusravi, who instigated the uprising in Chagarkhur, and distributing ammunition to other rebels in the regions of Kuhgilu and Qashqai after the surrender of the main rebels; Sartip Khan Buyir Ahmadi, who deserted from the army camp of General Abul Hasan Khan Purzand at a time of war against the Mamasani, joined the fighting against the army, and was involved in the battle of Tang-i Tamuradi; Shukrullah Khan Buyir Ahmadi, one of the commanders at Tang-i Tamuradi; Imam Quli Khan Mamasani, who caused significant damage to the Iranian army; Husayn Khan Darrehshuri, a Qashqai leader who was one of the main leaders of the 1929 southern Iran uprising and reached out to the Boyerahmadi to extend the spread of the revolt. Dozens of other leaders were arrested, either with life imprisonment or varying years of hard labor. Reza Shah needed Bakhtiari armed support to suppress the Lurs, Baluch, Qashqai, and Arabs. Once the tribes in Iran were suppressed, Reza Shah began fueling inner disputes among the Bakhtiaris. When the Haft Lang revolted in 1929, the Chahar Lang sided with the Iranian government and helped suppress the revolt. Reza Shah disarmed the Haft Lang, imprisoned their leaders, and settled the tribe members. Afterwards, Reza Shah disarmed the Chahar Lang as well. In 1931, Bakhtiari tribal titles were abolished.

== Aftermath ==
While each Luri tribe was affected differently by the sporadic fighting, the result was the complete domination of the Lurs for the first time in history. After the Lurs were defeated and disarmed, the Iranian government began emasculating Luri tribal power and integrating the Lurs into the national society of Iran.

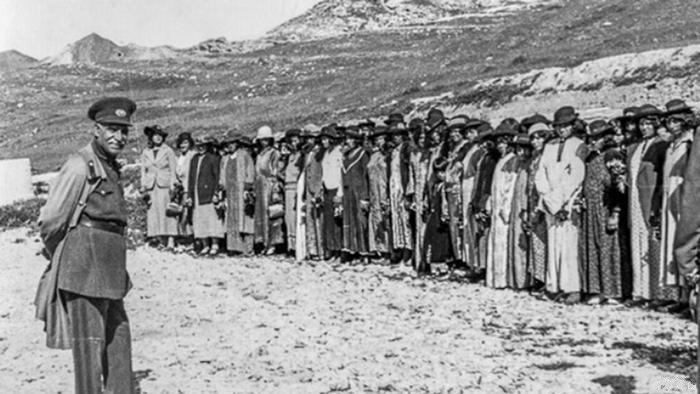
Reza Shah attends a public unveiling of Lur women at the beginning of kashf-e hijab in 1936

After the Lur tribes were defeated, several tribes were exiled to other regions of Iran such as Khorasan. Tribe leaders were executed and the tribes were disarmed. The Lurs politically declined, and the boundaries of Luristan province were changed and made smaller, with much territory being given to neighboring provinces. City names were changed. Many Lurs stopped using tribal names and even the organization of the tribes changed.

When Reza Shah was abdicated in 1941, many newly settled Lurs returned to their nomadic lives, although they would settle again, as Mohammad Reza Shah had avoided military conflict and instead gave the Lurs many incentives to permanently settle, such as programs to economically develop the Lur regions. Many settled Lurs assimilated among the Persians who lived in Lur regions. In 1946, the Mamasani and Boyerahmadi revolted with British support, capturing Kazerun. Afterwards, Mohammad Reza Shah invited tribe leaders to Tehran and was primarily interested in the Boyerahmadi, giving them special privileges. However, Mohammad Reza Shah did not fulfill his promises, and Abdullah Khan Boyerahmadi (Zerghampour) eventually led another revolt that was suppressed in 1964. After the revolt was suppressed, the government established checkpoints throughout the Boyerahmadi region, expanded the school system, and employed Boyerahmadi young men and sent them to nearby major cities to work. Under Mohammad Reza Shah, the tensions between the Lurs and the Pahlavi government decreased from the high tensions under Reza Shah, and the government was able to achieve a lasting peace in Luristan and other Lur-populated areas. During the Islamic revolution, tribal people all across Iran had been one of the main supporters of the revolution, due to their experiences under the Pahlavi government. When the Islamic republic came to power, it showed more tolerance to tribal groups, including Lurs. However, the Islamic republic officially retained the policy of the Pahlavi government which aimed to unite all of Iran in a centralized state under a single Iranian national identity, based on the Persian culture and language, that eclipsed any ethnic, tribal, or regional identity. This later caused problems between the Islamic republic and minorities which supported the Islamic revolution due to hopes of increased rights. Despite Mohammad Reza Shah attempting to decrease the tensions with the Lurs, the Lurs continued to oppose the Pahlavi dynasty, and even the marriage of Mohammad Reza Shah to Soraya Esfandiary-Bakhtiary did not reconcile the Lurs with the Pahlavi government. During the Islamic revolution, the Luri tribes rallied against the Pahlavi dynasty. The Boyerahmadi Lurs were the last Luri tribe which the Pahlavi government could not integrate. After the Islamic revolution and the Iran-Iraq war, during the reconstruction period, the Iranian government launched initiatives to integrate the Boyerahmadi Lurs by capitalizing and developing the Boyerahmadi region, mainly by the Jihad of Construction. Boyerahmadis were also recruited by the IRGC to suppress tribal rebellions in Kurdistan and southern Iran. The Boyerahmadi Lurs started to detribalize and settle like the rest of the Lurs. After the Islamic revolution, the government approach towards the Lurs changed, and relations were initially improving, although the short phase of good relations ended soon after, as the issues which the Lurs faced had continued, and the Islamic republic did not act on its earlier promises, with the social and economic circumstances of the Lurs having remained poor and neglected. The tensions between the Lurs and the Islamic republic were not as extreme as the earlier tensions between the Lurs and Pahlavi government. Boyerahmadis later joined the revolt of Khosrow Khan Qashqai in 1980 against the new government, along with the Qashqai and Basseri. After the fall of the Pahlavi dynasty, the remaining nomadic Lurs had to settle after subsequent events like the 1979 Islamic revolution and the Iran–Iraq War severely damaged them and their way of life. By 1986, the majority of Lurs had permanently settled in villages or small towns or had moved to the cities.

In 2002, Sekandar Amanolahi, who expounded on the relationship of Reza Shah and the Lurs, stated that in Iran, the sources about the military operations of Reza Shah against the Lurs were deliberately left scanty, unreliable and one-sided. He stated that the main Iranian military sources still deliberately distorted the reality. He claimed that they took full credit for the victory and none of them mentioned the Lurs who fought against other Lurs or persuaded them to surrender. He also claimed that none of the sources mentioned the several atrocities committed by the army, and portrayed the Lurs as evil. He also claimed that the sources did not mention the defeat of the army on numerous fronts and instead exaggerated the military achievements of the government. Amanolahi stated that "In any event, the scarcity of the historical materials and the unreliability of the available documents practically make it difficult, if not impossible, to reconstruct a full picture of the military operations in Luristan."
