= Ministry of Interior (Iran) =

Government ministry of Iran

- وزارت کشور (Persian); Vezârat-e Keshvar
- Flag of the Ministry of Interior

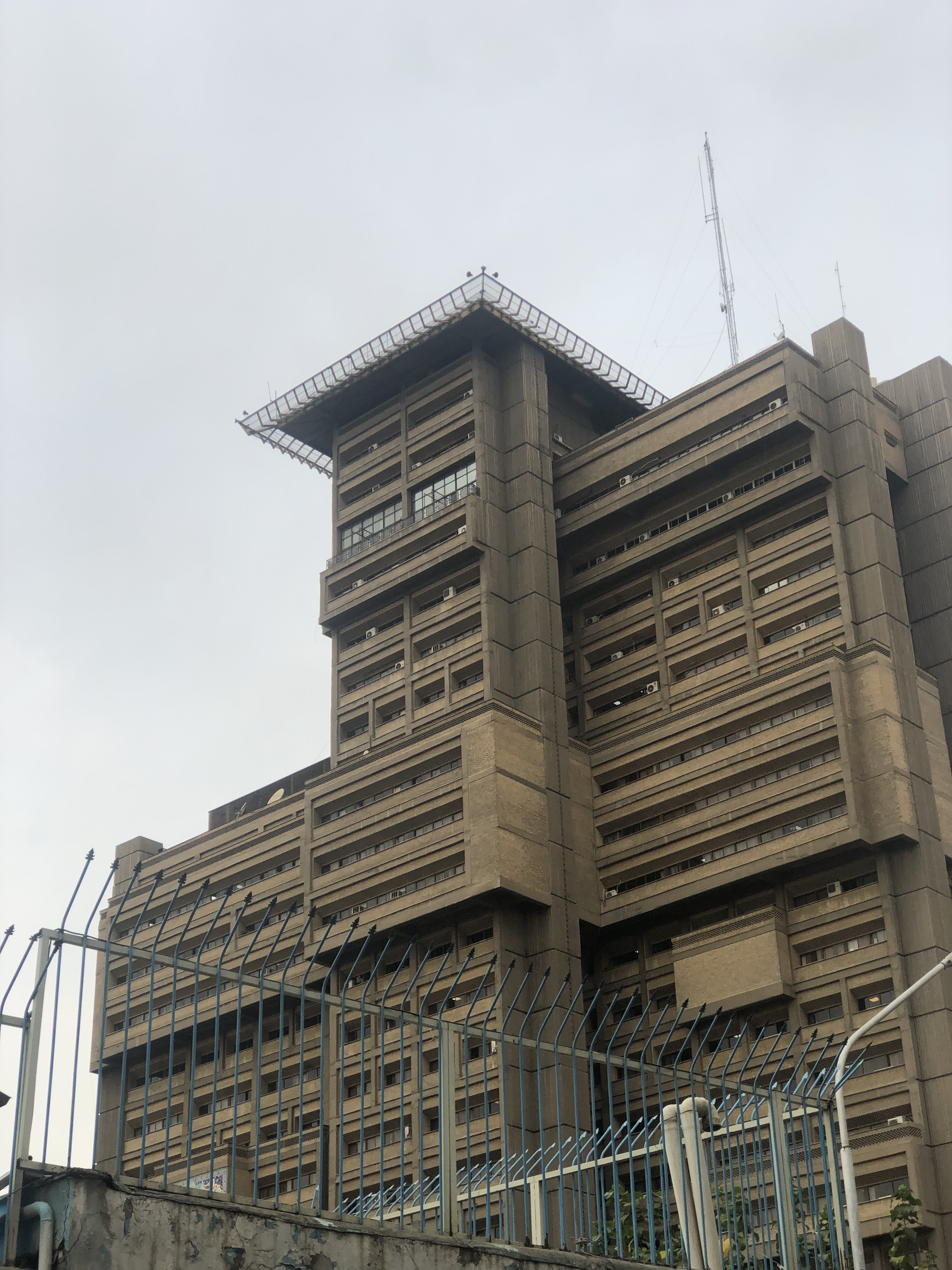

Agency overview
- Formed: 1901
- Jurisdiction: Government of the Islamic Republic of Iran
- Headquarters: Toopkhaneh, Tehran; 35°43′10.06″N 51°24′11.48″E
- Employees: 31,188 (2019)
- Minister responsible: Eskandar Momeni
- Child agency: National Migration Organization
- Website: Official Website

The Ministry of Interior (Note: Persian: وزارت کشور, romanized: Vezârat-e Keshvar, pronounced [vezɒːˈɹætʰe kʰeʃˈvæɹ]) of the Islamic Republic of Iran is in charge of performing, supervising and reporting elections, policing, and other responsibilities related to an interior ministry.

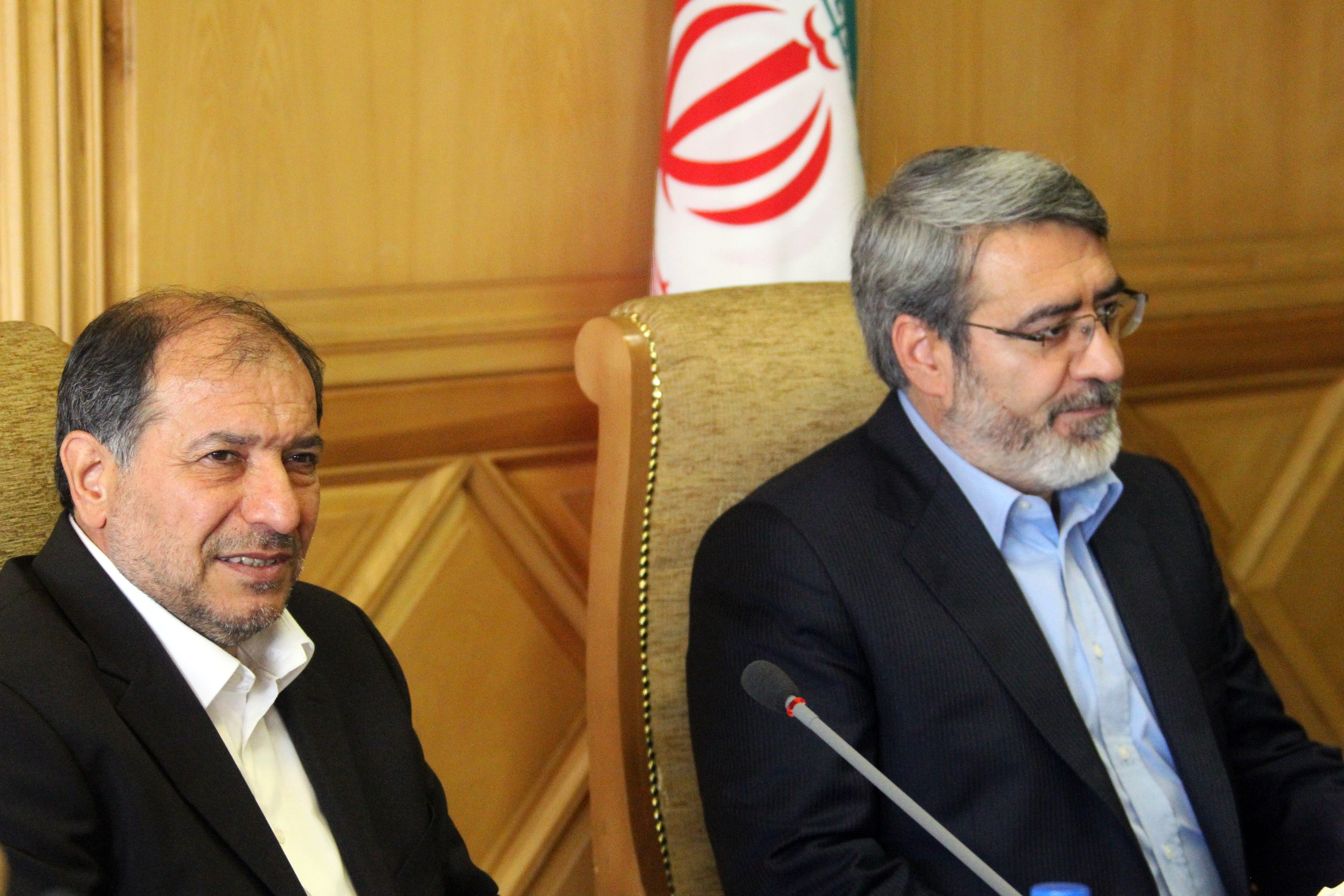
The former minister, Abdolreza Rahmani Fazli (right), and his predecessor, Mostafa Mohammad-Najjar

== Duties ==
- To provide and protect domestic security and establishment of peace and order across the country and coordination between intelligence, disciplinary, and military organs and protecting borders
- To manage police affairs
- To make an effort to achieve and develop political and social freedoms according to the constitution and other laws of the country and providing sustainable political and social development and promotion of public participation
- To protect and preserve the achievements of I.R. of Iran through public participations
- To provide conditions of appropriate practice of political and nongovernmental parties and formations and supervision on their activities
- To guide, lead and support of Islamic councils and supervision on their activities
- To establish desirable discipline in national divisions
- To coordinate and lead province governor generals to fulfill general policies and governmental plans
- To make policy, lead and supervise on affairs related to foreign nationals and emigrants
- To implement general policies of the government in order to make progress in social, economical and developmental plans
- To plan for elections affairs
- To coordinate for development of rural and urban development affairs and technical- executive guidance and support of municipalities and rural districts managers and supervision on execution of rules and regulations thereto
- To plan and manage to overcome crises resulted from natural disasters and unforeseen accidents
- To identify Iranian identities
- To supervise and manage affairs of regions across the country by governor generals, governors, governors of districts and rural district managers

== Subsidiaries ==
- National Migration Organization

== Ministers of Interior (1925–1979) ==
Reign of Reza Shah

- Hossein Dadgar (December 20, 1925–June 13, 1926)
- Mostowfi ol-Mamalek (June 13, 1926–1926)
- Mahmoud Alamir (1926–February 12, 1927)
- Mehdi Moshir Fatemi (February 12, 1927–June 2, 1927)
- Hossein Sami'i (June 2, 1927–March 20, 1930)
- Ali Mansur (March 20, 1930–April 20, 1933)
- Ali Asghar Zarrinkafash (April 20, 1933–September 17, 1933)
- Mahmoud Djam (September 17, 1933–September 30, 1937)
- Abolgassem Forouhar (September 30, 1937–February 26, 1939)
- Ali-Asghar Hekmat (February 26, 1939–June 21, 1940)
- Ali Soheili (June 30, 1940–August 27, 1941)

Reign of Mohammad Reza Shah

- Javad Ameri (August 27, 1941–September 21, 1941)
- Amanullah Jahanbani (September 21, 1941–December 4, 1941)
- Ahmad Amir-Ahmadi (December 4, 1941–July 7, 1942)
- Seyyed Mehdi Farrokh (July 7, 1942–August 9, 1942)
- Bagher Kazemi (August 9, 1942–August 23, 1942)
- Javad Ameri (August 23, 1942–January 21, 1943)
- Farajollah Bahrami (January 21, 1943–February 5, 1943)
- Ali Soheili (February 5, 1943–July 10, 1943)
- Hossein Sami'i (July 10, 1943–September 5, 1943)
- Mohammad Tadayyon (September 5, 1943–March 28, 1944)
- Abdolhossein Hazhir (March 28, 1944–September 6, 1944)
- Mohammad Sarwari (September 6, 1944–April 17, 1945)
- Ebrahim Hakimi (April 17, 1945–June 6, 1945)
- Mohsen Sadr (June 6, 1945–October 11, 1945)
- Khalil Fahimi (November 4, 1945–December 24, 1945)
- Allah-Yar Saleh (December 24, 1945–January 20, 1946)
- Ahmad Qavam (January 20, 1946–December 16, 1946)
- Ahmad Fereydouni (December 16, 1946–June 19, 1947)
- Farajollah Aqouli (June 19, 1947–September 22, 1947)
- Ahmad Qavam (September 22, 1947–December 25, 1947)
- Farajollah Aqouli (December 25, 1947–March 20, 1948)
- Ahmad Amir-Ahmadi (March 20, 1948–June 22, 1948)
- Khalil Fahimi (June 22, 1948–September 22, 1948)
- Manouchehr Eghbal (September 22, 1948–February 25, 1950)
- Ebrahim Zand (February 25, 1950–April 25, 1950)
- Amanullah Ardalan (April 25, 1950–June 26, 1950)
- Ali Razmara (June 26, 1950–November 20, 1950)
- Amanullah Ardalan (November 20, 1950–February 20, 1951)
- Ahmad Fereydouni (February 20, 1951–August 5, 1951) (Acting)
- Shamseddin Amir-Alai (August 5, 1951–November 30, 1951)
- Amirteymour Kalali (November 30, 1951–February 17, 1952)
- Allah-Yar Saleh (February 17, 1952–April 16, 1952)
- Mustafa Gholi Ram (April 16, 1952–June 22, 1952)
- Gholam Hossein Sadighi (June 22, 1952–August 19, 1953)
- Fazlollah Zahedi (August 19, 1953–April 5, 1955)
- Asadollah Alam (April 5, 1955–April 4, 1957)
- Fathollah Jalali (April 4, 1957–August 29, 1958)
- Nader Batmanghelidj (September 10, 1958–June 10, 1959)
- Rahmatullah Atabaki (June 10, 1959–August 31, 1960)
- Mehdi Qoli Alavi Moghadam (August 31, 1960–February 20, 1961)
- Sadegh Amirazizi (February 20, 1961–February 18, 1963)
- Seyyed Mehdi Pirasteh (February 18, 1963–March 4, 1964)
- Javad Sadr (March 4, 1964–March 21, 1966)
- Abdolreza Ansari (March 21, 1966–March 21, 1967)
- Ataollah Khosravani (March 21, 1967–November 1, 1967)
- Amir Qasem Moeini (November 1, 1967–March 21, 1971)
- Muhammad Sam (March 21, 1971–April 27, 1974)
- Jamshid Amouzegar (April 27, 1974–August 7, 1977)
- Asadollah Nasr Esfahani (August 7, 1977–August 28, 1978)
- Abbas Gharabaghi (August 28, 1978–January 6, 1979)
- Shapour Bakhtiar (January 6, 1979–February 11, 1979)

== Ministers of Interior since 1979 ==
No.	Portrait	Name	Took office	Left office	Party	Head of government
1		Ahmad Sayyed Javadi	13 February 1979	20 June 1979	Freedom Movement of Iran	Mehdi Bazargan
2		Hashem Sabbaghian	20 June 1979	6 November 1979	Freedom Movement of Iran	Mehdi Bazargan
3		Mohammad-Reza Mahdavi Kani	10 September 1980	3 September 1981	Combatant Clergy Association	Mohammad-Ali Rajai
3		Mohammad-Reza Mahdavi Kani	10 September 1980	3 September 1981	Combatant Clergy Association	Mohammad-Javad Bahonar
4		Kamaleddin Nikravesh	3 September 1981	15 December 1981	Islamic Coalition Party	Mir-Hossein Mousavi
5		Ali Akbar Nategh-Nouri	15 December 1981	28 October 1985	Combatant Clergy Association	Mir-Hossein Mousavi
6		Ali Akbar Mohtashamipur	28 October 1985	29 August 1989	Association of Combatant Clerics	Mir-Hossein Mousavi
7		Abdollah Nouri	29 August 1989	16 August 1993	Association of Combatant Clerics	Akbar Hashemi Rafsanjani
8		Ali Mohammad Besharati	16 August 1993	20 August 1997	Independent	Akbar Hashemi Rafsanjani
(7)		Abdollah Nouri	20 August 1997	21 June 1998	Association of Combatant Clerics	Mohammad Khatami
9		Abdolvahed Mousavi Lari	22 July 1998	24 August 2005	Association of Combatant Clerics	Mohammad Khatami
10		Mostafa Pourmohammadi	24 August 2005	15 May 2008	Combatant Clergy Association	Mahmoud Ahmadinejad
11		Ali Kordan	5 August 2008	4 November 2008	Independent	Mahmoud Ahmadinejad
12		Sadegh Mahsouli	24 December 2008	3 September 2009	Independent	Mahmoud Ahmadinejad
13		Mostafa Mohammad-Najjar	3 September 2009	15 August 2013	Independent	Mahmoud Ahmadinejad
14		Abdolreza Rahmani Fazli	15 August 2013	25 August 2021	Independent	Hassan Rouhani
15		Ahmad Vahidi	25 August 2021	21 August 2024	Independent	Ebrahim Raisi
16		Eskandar Momeni	21 August 2024	Incumbent	Independent	Masoud Pezeshkian

== See also ==
- Ministry of Intelligence (Iran)
- Ministry of Justice (Iran)
