= Mohammad Ali Varasteh =

Iranian politician and governor (1896–1989)

- محمدعلی وارسته
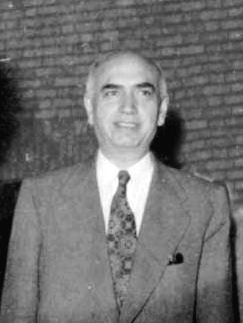

Minister of Finance
- In office March 1951 – 4 October 1951
- Monarch: Mohammad Reza Pahlavi
- Prime Minister: Hossein Ala'; Mohammad Mosaddegh
- Succeeded by: Mahmoud Nariman

Minister of Health
- In office 4 April 1950 – June 1950
- Monarch: Mohammad Reza Pahlavi
- Prime Minister: Ali Mansur
- Preceded by: Amir Alam
- Succeeded by: Jahanshah Saleh

Personal details
- Born: 1896
- Died: 1989 (aged 92–93) Tehran, Iran

Mohammad Ali Varasteh (1896–1989) was an Iranian statesman who held several cabinet posts in the 1950s and also, served as the governor of Isfahan province. He was the head of the regency council which was formed soon after Mohammad Reza Shah left Iran in January 1979.

== Biography ==
Varasteh was born in 1896. He served as the minister of health in the cabinet led by Prime Minister Ali Mansur between 4 April and June 1950. Varasteh replaced Amir Alam in the post, and his successor as health minister was Jahanshah Saleh. In March 1951, Varasteh was named as the minister of finance in the cabinet led by Hossein Ala'. However, his tenure ended on 27 April when the cabinet resigned. On 2 May, Varasteh was appointed to the same post in the next cabinet led by Prime Minister Mohammad Mosaddegh. He became one of the members of the Committee of Expropriation which was founded by Mosaddegh in May 1951 to eliminate British control in Iran's oil industry. Varasted was also head of the Iranian delegation which had been formed to implement this process. He resigned from office and was replaced by Mahmoud Nariman as finance minister.

Following the coup in 1953 which ended the premiership of Mosaddegh Varasted was appointed the governor of Isfahan province. Then he was made a senator. In 1963, protests led by religious figures intensified in Iran due to the policies of Mohammad Reza Shah. Hossein Ala', Abdollah Entezam and Varasteh personally expressed their concerns about the Shah's policies and their potential results which made all of them outsiders in the court. In addition, Ala' and Entezam were dismissed from the Senate of Iran to which they had just been appointed.

Soon after the Shah left Iran, a regency council was established to undertake the duties of the Shah in January 1979. Varasteh was named as one of the members of the council. Initially Seyed Jalaleddin Tehrani was named as the head of the council, but he resigned soon. Varasted replaced him as the chair of the regency council. He died in Tehran in 1989.
