= Qadam Kheyr =

Iranian local heroine (1899–1933)

Qadam Kheyr (Northern Luri: قَدَمخَیر, Persian: قدم‌خیر, romanized: QadamXeyr; 1899–1933) of the Qalavand tribe, was a notable Luri woman of the late Qajar and early Pahlavi eras in Iran.

Qadam Kheyr is a Kurdish feminine given name meaning "step of goodness and happiness".

== Biography ==
Qadam Kheyr was born in 1899 in the Alvar-e Garmsiri District of Andimeshk, hailing from the Qalavand tribe. Her father Këkha Qani was in charge of the large Qalavand clan, while her mother was a noblewoman named Javaher. She learned good social interactions, equestrian and shooting skills thanks to her paternal family status. Her only child, a boy named Mohammad, was from her first husband Abbas. After the divorce, she married Saf Qoli, who was killed in battle with Iranian forces. After the war ended and the crushing defeat of the tribes by the governments forces, she married Jalal-Khan Walizade.

Qadam Kheyr is considered a heroine in Luri communities and is praised as a brave, strong and upstanding woman. She gained a great reputation due to her efforts, which included the participation in the armed struggle alongside her brothers and husband and her dedication to deliver food and military equipment to tribal combat forces during the Luri tribal-governmental clashes (1927–1933). The clashes ultimately resulted in the death of her husband and both brothers, as well as the nomads heavy defeat. The British - Italian explorer and travel writer Freya Stark documented the reputation of Qadam Kheyr among Lurs and described her as a beautiful woman used to fighting along with her tribesmen against the enemies, skilled in shooting on horseback. When a Luri storyteller praises good deeds of Qadam Kheyr, her courage, fitness and beauty, it simulates the Epic Gordafarid to the audience. She died in 1933, four years after the death of her brothers and husband at Susa, and was buried in the a cemetery next to the old bridge in Dezful.

== Legacy ==
Qadam Kheyr's name continues to be commemorated in the Kurdistan Region through institutions and places named in her honor. Among them is Qadam Kheyr School in Erbil. Qadam Kheyr is a relatively common name among Kurds.
