= National Migration Organization =

Iranian government agency

- سازمان ملی مهاجرت

Agency overview
- Preceding agency: Bureau for Aliens and Foreign Immigration Affairs
- Parent agency: Ministry of Interior
- Website: irmigrationorg.ir (archive)

National Migration Organization (Persian: سازمان ملی مهاجرت), also known as Immigrants National Organization (سازمان ملی مهاجرین) is an Iranian government agency responsible for immigration. It was proposed in 2018 and incorporated in 2022.
