= Fazlollah Zahedi =

Iranian politician (1892–1963)

- فضل‌الله زاهدی
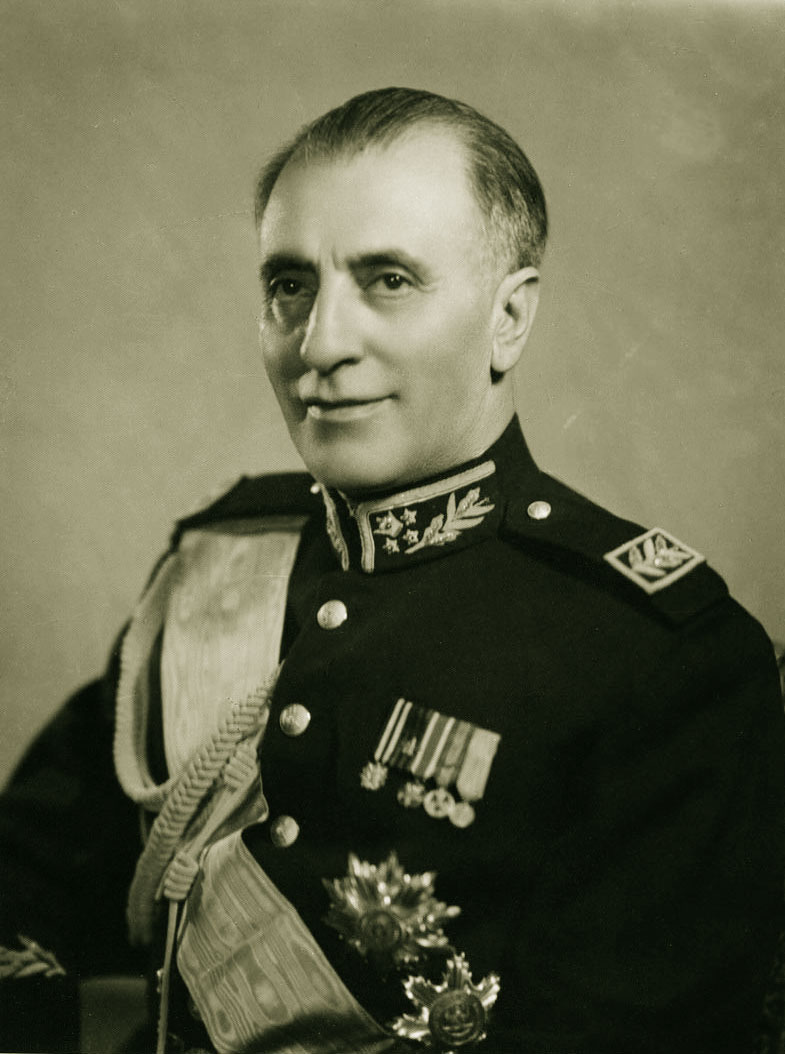
- Zahedi in 1954

36th Prime Minister of Iran
- In office 19 August 1953 (Note: De Jure took office on the 13th of August 1953 by the Shah's royal decree, remained unrecognised by the Iranian Government until after the overthrow of Mosaddegh on the 19th.) – 7 April 1955
- Monarch: Mohammad Reza Pahlavi
- Preceded by: Mohammad Mosaddegh
- Succeeded by: Hossein Ala'

Minister of Interior
- In office 19 August 1953 – 5 April 1955
- Prime Minister: Himself
- Preceded by: Gholam Hossein Sadighi
- Succeeded by: Asadollah Alam

Chief of the Shahrbani
- In office 15 May 1951 – 10 July 1951
- Prime Minister: Mohammad Mosaddegh
- Preceded by: Abdol Hossein Hejazi
- Succeeded by: Hassan Baghaei
- In office 14 November 1949 – 22 May 1950
- Prime Minister: Mohammad Sa'ed; Ali Mansur
- Preceded by: Mohammad Ali Safari
- Succeeded by: Seyyed Mehdi Farrokh
- In office 22 November 1930 – 1931
- Monarch: Reza Shah
- Prime Minister: Mehdi Hedayat
- Preceded by: Mohammad Sadeq Kopal
- Succeeded by: Mohammad-Hosayn Ayrom

Commander of the Iranian Gendarmerie
- In office September 1941 – December 1941
- Prime Minister: Mohammad Ali Foroughi
- Preceded by: Mahmoud Khosropanah
- Succeeded by: Farajollah Aqawli
- In office May 1929 – mid-June 1929
- Monarch: Reza Shah
- Prime Minister: Mehdi Hedayat
- Preceded by: Ali Tofiqi
- Succeeded by: Morteza Yazdanpanah

Personal details
- Born: 17 May 1892 Hamedan, Iran
- Died: 2 September 1963 (aged 71) Geneva, Switzerland
- Resting place: Zahedi Family Tomb, Imamzadeh Abdollah, Ray, Iran
- Spouse: Khadijeh Pirnia ol-Moluk (divorced)
- Children: 2, including Ardeshir Zahedi
- Relatives: Hossein Pirnia (father-in-law)

Military service
- Allegiance: Qajar Iran (1910–1925); Pahlavi Iran (1925–1941; (1945–1953)
- Branch/service: Imperial Iranian Army
- Years of service: 1910–1941; 1945–1953
- Rank: Lieutenant general
- Battles/wars: Jungle Movement rebellion; Simko Shikak revolt (1918–1922); Simko Shikak revolt (1926); World War II; Anglo-Soviet invasion of Iran
- Awards: Order of Sepah; Order of Merit; Order of the Crown; Order of Zolfaghar

Fazlollah Zahedi (Iranian Persian: فضل‌الله زاهدی, romanized: Fazlollāh Zāhedi, Iranian Persian pronunciation: [fæzlol.lɒ́ːʰ zɒːheˈdiː]; 17 May 1892 – 2 September 1963) was an Iranian military officer and statesman who replaced the Iranian Prime Minister Mohammad Mosaddegh through a coup d'état supported by the United States and the United Kingdom.

== Early life ==
=== Early years ===
Born in Hamadan on 17 May 1892, Fazlollah Zahedi was the son of Abol Hassan "Bassir Diwan" Zahedi, a wealthy landowner. He was a descendant of the Sufi mystic Sheikh Zahed Gilani and Sheikh Safi-ad-Din Ardabili, the eponym of the Safavid dynasty, and through his mother, Djavaher Khanom, he traced his descent to the dynastic ruler Karim Khan Zand. Through him, Zahedi was a distant relative of Mohammad Mosaddegh.

During his service at the Imperial Russian-trained Iranian Cossack Brigade, one of his military superiors was Reza Khan, who later became the Iranian monarch. Zahedi was among the officers dispatched to Gilan to put an end to the Jangal movement of Mirza Kuchik Khan. At the age of 23, as a company commander, Zahedi led troops into battle against rebel tribesmen in the northern provinces. Two years later, Reza Shah promoted him to the rank of brigadier general. He was involved in the overthrow of Seyyed Zia'eddin Tabatabaee's government in 1920 with the help of Meguertitch Khan Davidkhanian.

During Reza Shah's reign, General Zahedi was named military governor of Khuzestan province in 1926, which was his first important government position. In 1932, he was appointed Chief of National Police, one of the nation's top internal posts. In 1941, he was appointed Commanding General of the Isfahan division.

== Arrest and internment ==
Following the forced abdication of Reza Shah in 1941, the British came to believe that Zahedi was planning a general uprising in cooperation with German forces: he had close Nazi connections and as one of the worst grain-hoarders, he was responsible for widespread popular discontent in Iran. He was arrested in his own office by Fitzroy Maclean, who details the operation, codenamed PONGO, in his 1949 memoir Eastern Approaches. On searching Zahedi's bedroom Maclean found "a collection of automatic weapons of German manufacture, a good deal of silk underwear, some opium, an illustrated register of the prostitutes of Isfahan," and correspondence from a local German agent. Zahedi was flown out of the country and interned in Palestine.

=== Return from internment ===
After returning from internment in 1945 during the reign of Mohammad Reza Shah (Reza Shah's son and successor), General Zahedi became Inspector of military forces in southern Iran. He became once more chief of national police (Shahrbani) in 1949, when Mohammad Reza Shah appointed him as chief of the Shahrbani Police Forces, in order to counter the growing threat of Sepahbod Haj Ali Razmara.

== After 1945 ==
=== The 1950s ===
After retiring from the army, he was named Senator in 1950. Zahedi was appointed minister of interior in Hossein Ala''s administration in 1951, a post he would retain when Mohammad Mosaddegh became prime minister. Zahedi actively supported the new government's nationalisation of the oil industry, which had previously been owned by the Anglo-Iranian Oil Company, now BP. However, he was at odds with Mosaddegh over his increasing tolerance for the outlawed communist party Tudeh, which had boldly demonstrated in favor of nationalisation. Both of these moves antagonised the Western Powers, especially the United Kingdom and the United States. Zahedi was dismissed by Prime Minister Mosaddegh after a bloody crackdown on pro-nationalization protesters in mid-1951 in which 20 people were killed and 2000 wounded.

Zahedi finally broke with Mosaddegh, with the latter accusing him of fostering plans for a coup. Meanwhile, sanctions levied by the Western Powers significantly curtailed Iranian oil exports, leading to an economic crisis. Disorder among several ethnic groups in southern Iran and labor unrest among oil-field workers put further pressures on the government.

=== 1953 coup ===
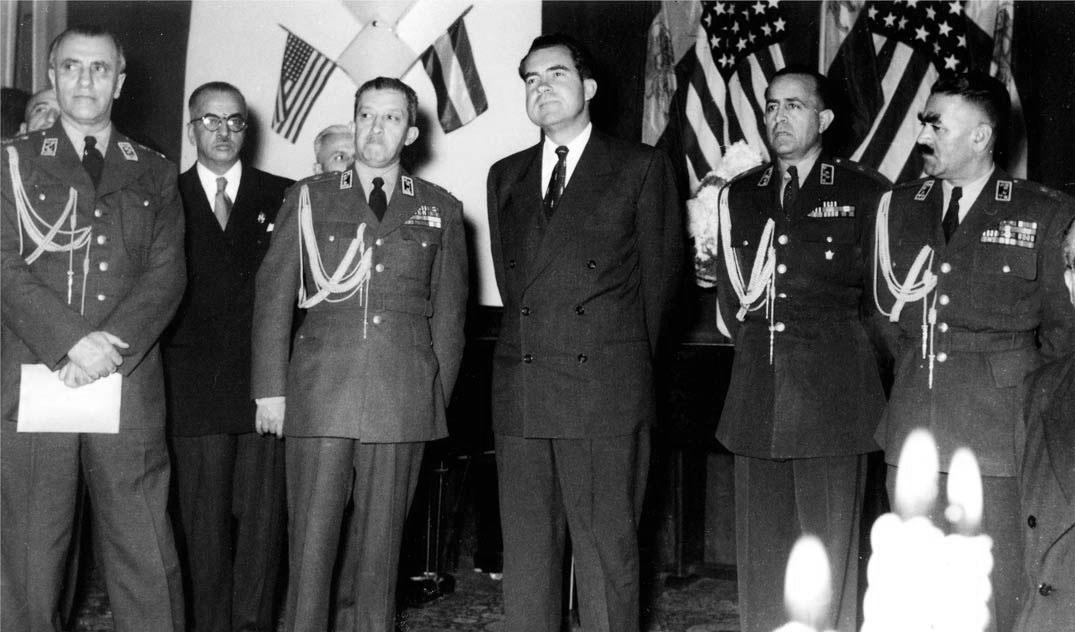
Zahedi (far left) with Richard Nixon at the Shah's palace, Tehran, 13 December 1953

At the behest of the British and American governments, the Iranian military carried out a coup d'état which put an end to Mosaddegh's rule and the era of constitutional monarchy and replaced it by direct rule of the Shah. The newly formed CIA, along with the British intelligence agency MI6, took an active role in the developments, terming their involvement Operation Ajax. Zahedi and his followers, financed by the foreign intelligence services, planted newspaper articles in Iranian publications and paid agent provocateurs to start riots. There were such riots in Tehran and other cities. Fearing his arrest, Zahedi went into hiding.

On 15 August, after the first attempted coup d'état failed, the Shah fled first to Baghdad, Iraq, and then to Rome, Italy, after signing two decrees, one dismissing Mosaddegh and the other naming Zahedi to replace him as Prime Minister. Both decrees were in accordance with clause 46 of the Iranian constitution, which stated that the Shah had the power to appoint all Ministers.

Backed by the United Kingdom and the United States, and encouraged by the intelligence agents Kermit Roosevelt Jr. and Donald Wilber, Zahedi staged a second coup on 19 August 1953. Military units arrested Mosaddegh at his home at night. The Shah returned from exile on 22 August 1953. According to the CIA, Zahedi was chosen because he was acceptable to the United States and Britain, had a long record of opposing Mosaddegh, had a significant following, and was willing to take the job.

=== Premiership and later years ===
General Zahedi was appointed prime minister in August 1953, and his cabinet was declared on 20 August. One-third of the ministers in Zahedi's cabinet were army officers. His tenure as prime minister ended in April 1955, and he was replaced by Hossein Ala'.

His final post was Ambassador to the United Nations, in Geneva, where he died in 1963.

== Personal life ==
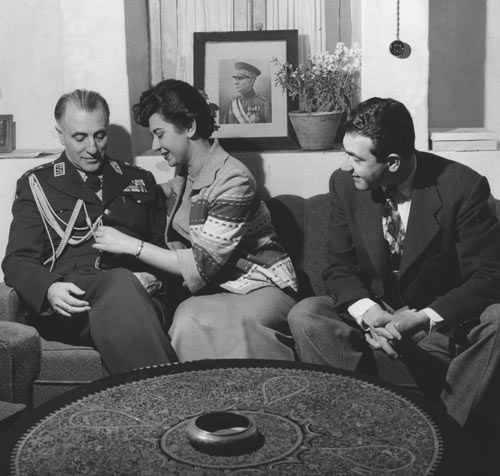
Zahedi with his daughter Homa and his son Ardeshir

Zahedi married Khadijeh Pirnia ol-Moluk, daughter of Hossein Pirnia (titled Mo'tamen al Molk), and maternal granddaughter to Mozaffar ad-Din Shah Qajar. They had a son, Ardeshir, and a daughter, Homa. Ardeshir was a politician and diplomat who married Princess Shahnaz Pahlavi, the daughter of Mohammad Reza Pahlavi from his first marriage to Princess Fawzia of Egypt, daughter of King Fuad I. His daughter Homa Zahedi was a member of Parliament, representing the constituency of the Hamadan province. She was married to journalist and politician Dariush Homayoon.

According to The New York Times report a day after the 1953 coup, "General Zahedi married twice, but it is not known here whether his second wife is living. By his second wife he had two sons, one of whom lives in Sydney, Australia, while the second son, an air force officer, was killed in a crash".

In 1948, Zahedi founded a hospital in the town of Damagh named after his mother, Zahra Zahedi, who wished for the construction of this hospital in her will. Zahedi himself allocated money to the hospital. According to a letter written to Ardeshir, the hospital enjoyed an outstanding reputation.

== See also ==
- Anglo-Soviet invasion of Iran
- List of prime ministers of Iran
- Monarchism in Iran

== Notes ==
Military offices
Preceded by Aboulfazl Sa'datmand	Chief commander of Imperial Army; 1938–1942	Succeeded by Haj Ali Razmara
Preceded by Haj Ali Razmara	Chief commander of Imperial Army; 1950–1951	Succeeded by Mohammad Amir Khatami
Political offices
Preceded by Hossein Ala'	Minister of Interior of Iran; 1951	Succeeded by Hossein Ala'
Preceded by Abdol-Hossein Meftah	Minister of Foreign Affairs of Iran; 1953	Succeeded by Abdollah Entezam
Preceded by Mohammad Mosaddegh	Prime Minister of Iran; 1953–1955	Succeeded by Hossein Ala'
