= Front for the Liberation of Iran =

Iran Liberation Front
- Leader: Ali Amini
- Founded: 19 January 1982
- Headquarters: Paris, France
- Ideology: Monarchism (Iranian)

Front for the Liberation of Iran (FIL), Iran Liberation Front (ILF) or the Saviour Front (Persian: جبهه نجات ایران) was an Iranian monarchist organization based in Paris, which sought to restore the Pahlavi dynasty following the Iranian Revolution. It was led by Ali Amini, former Prime Minister of Iran, who announced establishment of the group on 19 January 1982.

== Agreement with National Resistance Movement of Iran ==
In July 1983, the organization signed an agreement with the National Resistance Movement of Iran, another French-based organization led by Shapour Bakhtiar over shared policies, which included installing Reza Pahlavi. By 1984, personal conflicts had reduced effectiveness of this alliance, according to Anoushiravan Ehteshami.

== CIA funding ==
The Central Intelligence Agency (CIA) reportedly funded the organization since 1982, paying a monthly stipend of $100,000. The money included $20,000–$30,000 for the expenses of a radio named Radio Nejat (lit. 'Radio Liberation') which was broadcast from Egypt to Iran four hours a day. The radio's greatest achievement was on September 5, 1986, when the CIA overrode Iranian domestic TV frequencies, sending the 11-minutes speech of Reza Pahlavi.

When the news of CIA money circulated media in the United States, France and Iran, Amini who felt his reputation was damaged, withdrew from politics.

Amini was replaced by Manouchehr Ganji in 1986.
