= Abdol Hossein Hejazi =

Iranian army officer and politician

Timsar Abdol Hossein Hejazi
- عبدالحسین حجازی
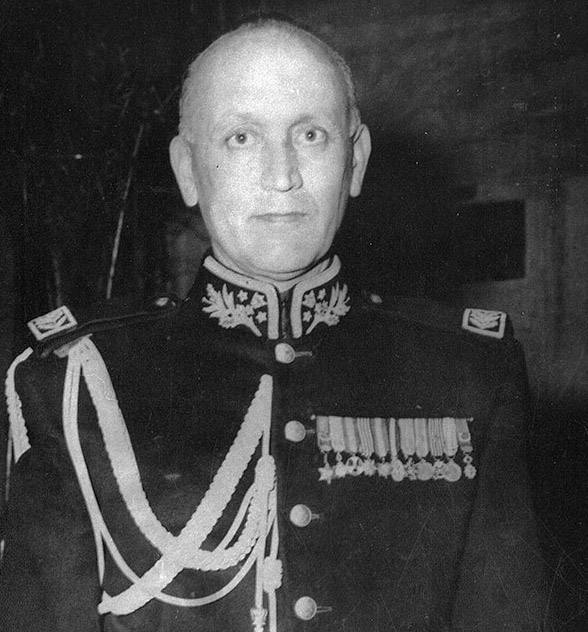

Chief of the Joint Staff
- In office 15 March 1961 – 21 December 1965
- Preceded by: Abdollah Hedayat
- Succeeded by: Bahram Aryana

Commander of the Imperial Iranian Ground Forces
- In office 11 February 1958 – 15 March 1961
- Preceded by: Bahram Aryana
- Succeeded by: Reza Azimi

Deputy Chief of the Joint Staff
- In office ?–1958

Chief of the Shahrbani
- In office 20 March 1951 – 15 May 1951
- Preceded by: Mohammad Daftari
- Succeeded by: Fazlollah Zahedi

Personal details
- Born: 1904 Tehran, Qajar Iran
- Died: 1969 (aged 64–65) Tehran, Pahlavi Iran

Military service
- Allegiance: Qajar Iran (1923–1925); Pahlavi Iran (1925–1966)
- Branch/service: Imperial Iranian Army
- Years of service: 1923–1966
- Rank: General

Abdol Hossein Hejazi (1904–1969) was an Iranian military officer who served as the commander of the Imperial Iranian Army's Ground Forces between 1958 and 1960.

== Biography ==
Hejazi was born in 1904. He graduated from École Spéciale Militaire de Saint-Cyr in France. He was a major general. Following the proclamation of the martial law on 20 March 1951 after the approval of the nationalization of oil by the Senate he was appointed military governor. Hejazi was also made the chief of police on the same date replacing General Mohammad Faftari who had resigned from the post.

He served as the head of the military college until August 1952 when he was removed from the post. The reason for Hejazi's removal was his alliance with Fazlollah Zahedi who was a retired military officer and senator and a rival of Prime Minister Mohammad Mosaddegh. Another reason was his involvement in the alleged coup plot against Mosaddegh. On 13 October 1952 an arrest warrant was issued for Hejazi, Assadollah Rashidian, his brother and others. They were arrested, but were soon released.

Following the removal of Mohammad Mosaddegh, Hejazi returned to the army and served as the commanding general of the 3rd corps of the Imperial Iranian Army. He was named as a military adviser to the Mohammad Reza Shah in September 1953. Hejazi was promoted to the rank of lieutenant general in 1958 and then to the rank of full general. Hejazi also served as the ambassador of Imperial Iran to Pakistan.

Hejazi committed suicide in 1969. The Iranian newspapers of the period reported his death as "while cleaning his gun, a bullet suddenly came out of the barrel and killed him [Hejazi]."

Military offices
Preceded by Bahram Aryana	Commander of the Imperial Iranian Ground Force; 1958–1961	Succeeded by Reza Azimi
