= Manshour Varasteh =

Academic and political activist

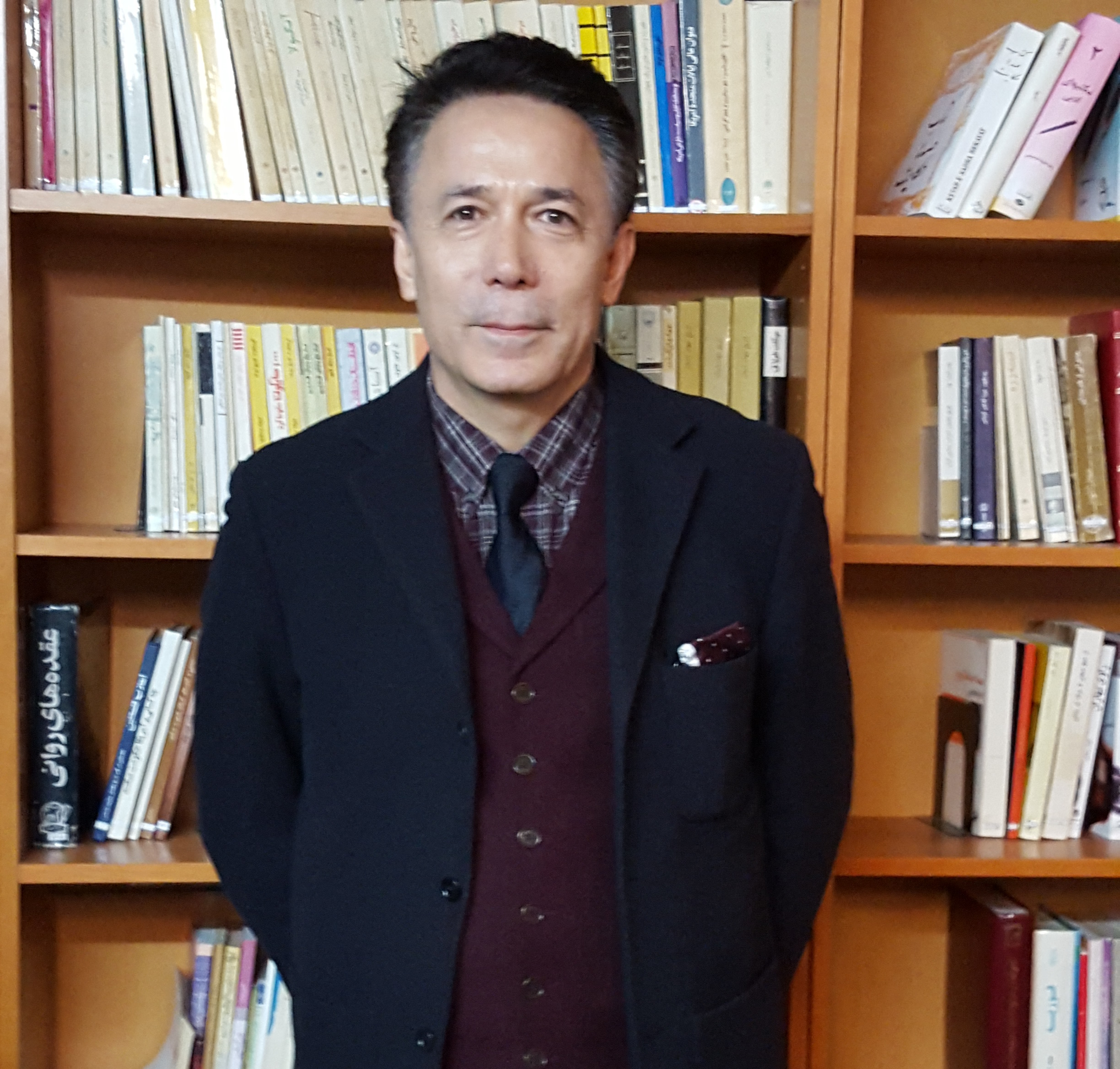
- Manshour Varasteh in 2015
- Education: Aberystwyth University

Manshour Varasteh (Persian: منشور وارسته) is an academic author, researcher, and political activist. He serves as a member of the National Council of Resistance of Iran, appearing in several of the group's broadcasts.

== Formative years and education ==
As a political activist during Pahlavi dynasty, he was detained by SAVAK. After release, he began to study the organized anti-shah resistance becoming familiar with Massoud Rajavi's People's Mujahedin of Iran. Until the 1979 Revolution and down fall of Pahlavi dynasty in Iran, he was barred from leaving the country. After the revolution, he was involved in promoting human rights through NGO's. Due to his activities he was forced to leave Iran in 1981 and has been living in exile ever since. By 1990, he got his PhD in International Politics from The University of Wales/Aberystwyth.

== Publications ==
Varasteh has published books in English and Persian which included:

- Iran and International Community.
- The Mullah's nightmare (in Persian).
- Ascent and Descent of Marxist forces in Contemporary Iran.
- Iran's National Security Doctrine, From Khatami to Ahmadinejad (in Persian).
- Understanding Iran's National Security Doctrine, New Millennium.
- Against all odds (in Persian).
- Foundation of democracy in free Iran (in Persian).
