= Persian tribal uprisings of 1929 =

Date	1929–1933
Location	Fars region, Iran
Result	Suppression and defeat of the uprising: Disarmament and forced sedentarization (settlement) of the tribes

Belligerents
Pahlavi Iran	Rebel tribes; Qashqai; Khamseh; Buyir Ahmadi; Bakhtiari

Commanders and leaders
Reza Shah; Mohammad Nakhjavan; Fazlollah Zahedi; Abolhasan Khan; Mostashar-os-Saltaneh Mashayekhi; Colonel Mohammad-Taqi Khan Arab Sheybani †	Solat al-Dowleh Qashqai; Malek Mansour Khan Qashqai; Keylerasb Batouli; Kazem Khan Baharloo; Mehdi Khan Sorakhi; Mirza Amirqoli Nafar; Keyzad Nafar

The Persian tribal uprisings of 1929 were a series of rebellions in the Imperial State of Persia by the Qashqai, Khamseh and the Buyir Ahmadi and the Bakhtiari. It began in the early spring of 1929, when the Qashqai, led by Ali Salar Hishmat Qashqai rose up against the Persian government. The rebels mainly operated from village of Siyuk, south of Shiraz. As the year continued, additional rebellions by the Khamseh and the Buyir Ahmadi in eastern and northern Fars province respectively.

In early May 1929, Ali Qashqai offered a list of conditions for peace with the government:

- the release of Sawlat al-Dawlah from Prison in Tehran
- the appointment of Sawlat or, failing him, or his elder son, Nasir Khan, as the ilkhani of the Qashqai
- the Qashqai not to be deprived of their arms
- conscription not to be applied to the Qashqai
- the law of uniformity of clothing not to be applied to the Qashqai
- the census department and the department for the registration of title deeds to be abolished

These terms were refused. By early June, the government had lost complete control of Fars province outside of Shiraz, which came under rebel siege in mid-June. Following an additional Bakhtiari uprising in Dih Kurd, Isfahan province on 9 July led by Mardan Khan, the government agreed to the peace terms and most rebel tribes in Fars province, except for Ali Qashqai surrendered. The Bakhtiari continued to fight and Safid Dasht was under siege by mid-July. In late July, the government offered amnesties and most Bakhtiari rebel leaders surrendered then. Mardan Khan, the nominal leader of the revolt, refused to surrender until autumn.

In 1932, the government sent a contingent of 500 troops to defeat Ali Qashqai, but was unsuccessful. The rebellion ended after a peace agreement in 1933 in Tehran.
