= Shahsavan =

Shahsavan شاهسون
- Village
- Location within Iran
- Coordinates: 34°28′05″N 47°38′42″E
- Country: Iran
- Province: Kermanshah
- County: Sahneh
- Bakhsh: Central
- Rural District: Hojr

Population (2006)
  - Total: 252
- Time zone: UTC+3:30 (IRST)
  - Summer (DST): UTC+4:30 (IRDT)

Shahsavan (Persian: شاهسون, also Romanized as Shāhsavan) is a village in Hojr Rural District, in the Central District of Sahneh County, Kermanshah Province, Iran. At the 2006 census, its population was 252, in 63 families.
