= Ali Amini =

Iranian politician (1905–1992)

- علی امینی
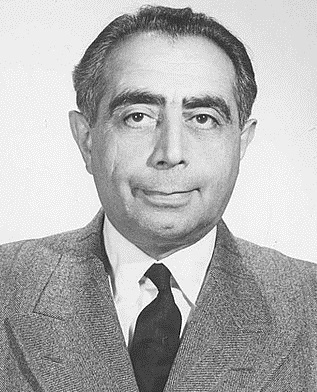

34th Prime Minister of Iran
- In office 5 May 1961 – 19 July 1962
- Monarch: Mohammad Reza Shah
- Preceded by: Jafar Sharif-Emami
- Succeeded by: Asadollah Alam

Ambassador of Iran to the United States
- In office 24 January 1956 – 22 May 1958
- Monarch: Mohammad Reza Shah
- Preceded by: Nasrollah Entezam
- Succeeded by: Ali Gholi Ardalan

Minister of Justice
- In office 7 April 1955 – 24 January 1956
- Prime Minister: Hossein Ala

Minister of Finance
- In office 19 August 1953 – 6 April 1955
- Prime Minister: Fazlollah Zahedi
- Preceded by: Nezam-ed-din Emami
- Succeeded by: Nasrollah Jahangir

Minister of Economy
- In office 5 August 1951 – 16 July 1952
- Prime Minister: Mohammad Mosaddegh
- Preceded by: Shamseddin Amir-Alaei
- Succeeded by: Bagher Kazemi
- In office 23 March 1950 – 26 June 1950
- Prime Minister: Ali Mansur

Member of the National Consultative Assembly
- In office 12 June 1947 – 28 July 1949
- Constituency: Tehran

Personal details
- Born: 12 September 1905 Tehran, Iran
- Died: 12 December 1992 (aged 87) Paris, France
- Party: Saviour Front (1982–1986); Democrat Party (1946–1948)
- Spouse: Batoul Voosough (m. 1932; died 1992)
- Children: 1
- Parent: Fakhr-ol-dowleh (mother)
- Relatives: Mozaffar ad-Din Shah Qajar (grandfather); Vossug ed Dowleh (father-in-law)
- Education: University of Grenoble; University of Paris

Ali Amini (Persian: علی امینی; 12 September 1905–12 December 1992) was an Iranian politician who was the Prime Minister of Iran from 1961 to 1962. He held several cabinet portfolios during the 1950s, and served as a member of parliament between 1947 and 1949.

Amini was widely regarded as "a protégé of the United States" and a "pro-American liberal reformer".

== Early life and education ==
Amini was born on 12 September 1905 in Tehran. He was a grandson of Mozaffar ad-Din Shah Qajar through his mother, Fakhr-ol-Dowleh. His father was a significant statesman during the Qajar era, Mohsen Amin-ol-dowleh.

He completed his studies first in Dar ol-fonoon and then in France where he graduated with a degree in law from Grenoble University, followed by his PhD in economics from Paris. His PhD thesis was concerned with the foreign trade monopoly in Iran.

Upon his return to Iran, he was employed at the Ministry of Justice by Ali-Akbar Davar.

== Career ==
Amini was a founding member of the Democrat Party of Iran, and entered the 15th term of parliament with the party's ticket. His first ministerial portfolio was in the cabinet of Ali Mansur.

He served as a minister in the cabinet of Mohammad Mosaddegh, but broke away from Mosaddegh in July 1952. He was later regarded as a "traitor" by the National Front, because of his collaboration with the post-1953 Iranian coup d'état government. He became minister of economic affairs in the cabinet of Fazlollah Zahedi and remained in office until 1955. He was then appointed as the justice minister under Hossein Ala' in 1955. He was named the ambassador to the US in 1956 which he held until 1958.

His tendencies were pro-American to the extent that they made the Shah uncomfortable. Mohammad Reza Shah in particular distrusted Amini's popularity and friendship with then-senator John F. Kennedy. Therefore, his tenure ended in 1958.

In the 1950s, Amini was a candidate for the premiership. He was appointed prime minister in 1961. In July 1962, however, he was replaced by the Shah's close friend and a major Birjand landowner Asadollah Alam. In the late 1970s, Amini attempted a comeback into Iranian politics at the age of 70. He served as an advisor to the Shah during the final days of the Pahlavi dynasty.

== Personal life ==
Amini married Batoul Voosough (died 1992) in 1932 and they had a son, Iraj. She was the daughter of Hasan Vosugh od-Dowleh whose brother was Ahmad Qavam.

== Honours ==
Amini was awarded Grand Croix of the Legion of Honor in 1962.

== Later years and death ==
In 1979 and following the Iranian Revolution, Amini moved to Paris, France. There he headed the Front for the Liberation of Iran, a monarchist opposition group. He complained about internal struggles among the exiled Iranian monarchists, saying "We're not even back in Tehran [and] they quarrel over the name of the country's future prime minister." He wrote his biography published by Harvard University.

He died in Paris on 12 December 1992, aged 87. His body was buried in Passy Cemetery.
