= Ali Razmara =

Iranian military officer and Prime Minister of Iran from 1950 to 1951

Timsar Ali Razmara
- علی رزم‌آرا
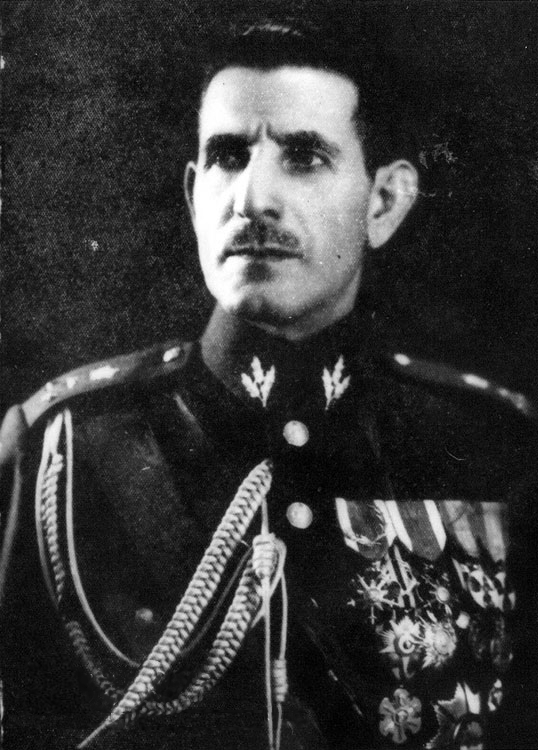
- Razmara in uniform.

28th Prime Minister of Iran
- In office 26 June 1950 – 7 March 1951
- Monarch: Mohammad Reza Pahlavi
- Preceded by: Ali Mansur
- Succeeded by: Khalil Fahimi (Acting); Hossein Ala'

Chief of the Joint Staff
- In office 1 July 1946 – 26 June 1950
- Monarch: Mohammad Reza Pahlavi
- Prime Minister: Ahmad Qavam; Ebrahim Hakimi; Abdolhossein Hazhir; Mohammad Sa'ed; Ali Mansur
- Preceded by: Farajollah Aghevli
- Succeeded by: Abbas Garzan
- In office 5 May 1944 – 27 December 1944
- Monarch: Mohammad Reza Pahlavi
- Prime Minister: Mohammad Sa'ed; Morteza-Qoli Bayat
- Preceded by: Ali Riazi
- Succeeded by: Hasan Arfa
- In office 23 July 1943 – 9 September 1943
- Monarch: Mohammad Reza Pahlavi
- Prime Minister: Ali Soheili
- Preceded by: Hasan Arfa
- Succeeded by: Ali Riazi

Minister of Interior
- In office 26 June 1950 – 20 November 1950
- Monarch: Mohammad Reza Pahlavi
- Prime Minister: himself
- Preceded by: Amanullah Ardalan
- Succeeded by: Amanullah Ardalan

Personal details
- Born: 30 March 1901 Tehran, Qajar Iran
- Died: 7 March 1951 (aged 49) Tehran, Pahlavi Iran
- Spouse: Anvar ol-Molouk Hedayat
- Children: 5
- Education: Mushir al-Dawlah Military School; Saint-Cyr

Military service
- Allegiance: Qajar Iran (1918–1925); Pahlavi Iran (1925–1951)
- Branch/service: Imperial Iranian Ground Forces
- Years of service: 1918–1951
- Rank: Lieutenant General
- Commands: First Division (1941–1943); Geographical Department of the Army Staff (1935–1937); Independent Lorestan Brigade (1932–1935)
- Battles/wars: Jungle Movement of Gilan; Simko Shikak revolt (1918–1922); Persian tribal uprisings of 1929; Jafar Sultan revolt; World War II; Anglo-Soviet invasion of Iran; Iran crisis of 1946

Ali Razmara, also known as Haj Ali Razmara (Persian: علی رزم‌آرا, romanized: ali Razm-ārā; 30 March 1901 – 7 March 1951), was an Iranian military officer and politician who served as the prime minister of Iran from 1950 to 1951.

He was assassinated by 26-year-old Khalil Tahmasebi of the Fada'iyan-e Islam organization outside the Shah Mosque in Tehran at the age of 49. Razmara was the third Iranian prime minister to be assassinated. In January 1965, Hasan Ali Mansur became the fourth Iranian Prime Minister to be assassinated, also by a Fada'iyan-e Islam member.

== Early life and education ==
Razmara was born on 30 March 1901, on the night before Eid al-Adha, in Tehran. For this reason, the honorific “Haj” was added to his name. His father, Mohammad Khan Razmara, was a military officer. He studied at Mushir al-Dawlah Military School and the military academy of Saint-Cyr in France.

== Career ==
=== Return to Iran ===
After returning to Iran, he was promoted to the rank of major while serving as a battalion commander. His performance as commander of the Kermanshah Regiment was so notable that in 1932, while retaining his existing position, he was also appointed acting commander of the Lorestan Brigade.

The following year, after receiving the rank of colonel, he undertook operations to clear the region of tribal forces.

In 1935, he was transferred to Tehran and joined the Army's Geographical Department

=== Professor at the War College ===
When the French General François-Georges Gendre established the War College in Iran, Ali Razmara was appointed his deputy and became a professor there. He taught tactics, map reading, and military geography.

In 1939, after nineteen years of military service, he attained the rank of Brigadier General and was appointed to the Supreme Military Council.

However, he was never able to assume a higher position in the army. The reason was reportedly a case before the Military Prosecutor's Office accusing Razmara of failing to carry out the death sentence of a member of a tribal group.

In September 1941, when Allied forces invaded Iran, he recommended a cessation of hostilities at a meeting of the Supreme War Council in the presence of Reza Shah.

Following the collapse of the Iranian army, in October 1941 he was appointed commander of the 1st Division in Tehran and reorganized it.

=== The Allied Occupation of Iran ===
In September 1941, following the Allied invasion and occupation of Iran during World War II, the Supreme War Council approved a plan to recruit contract soldiers, but Razmara refused to sign it.

After Reza Shah's departure, his old associates also retired, creating opportunities for younger officers to advance. Razmara was appointed commander of the 1st Central Division, replacing Major General Karim Buzarjomehri. He was subsequently appointed head of the Army's Training and Supply Division.

=== Commander of the Military Academy ===
In 1943, when the Allies arrested a large number of senior Iranian military figures on charges of fascist sympathies, Razmara was appointed Chief of the Army Staff.

As his popularity increased, he was also given command of the Military Academy and responsibility for the Shah's Military Office.

=== Chief of the Joint Staff ===
In 1944, Razmara was promoted to the rank of Major General and once again became Chief of the Joint Staff of the Imperial Iranian Army.

His tenure as Army Chief coincided with the accidental exposure of several members of the Revenge Group, a secret organization formed to oppose individuals associated with foreign powers. Razmara's influence reportedly resulted in the suspects being released and prevented the names of the group's other members from becoming publicly known.

According to Kamal Habibollahi, during Razmara's tenure as Chief of the Joint Staff, a serious effort was made to strengthen the Imperial Iranian Navy. This included beginning the dispatch of naval personnel to Britain for training and initiating efforts to establish complete Iranian naval control over the Persian Gulf without British presence.

=== The Campaign in Azerbaijan ===
When Ahmad Qavam came to power in 1946 amid serious political developments concerning Azerbaijan, Razmara was appointed Chief of the Army Staff.

After the withdrawal of Red Army forces, while negotiations between the Azerbaijani Democratic Party and Qavam's government were still underway, the Shah ordered Razmara to prepare the army for an advance into Azerbaijan and Kurdistan.

Although Qavam had been the most important figure in securing the withdrawal of Soviet forces from Azerbaijan in 1946 and preventing its annexation by the Soviet Union, he did not take decisive action against the Azerbaijani Democratic Party and the Republic of Mahabad.

There were reportedly two reasons for this. First, his government was allied with the Tudeh Party, which itself was an ally of Ja'far Pishevari, the leader of the Azerbaijani Democratic Party. Second, Qavam knew that resolving the Azerbaijan issue and calming the country's political atmosphere would lead to an alliance between the Shah and Qavam's opponents in parliament, ultimately resulting in his own downfall.

His negotiations with Pishevari came to an end when the Shah and Razmara first conducted an aerial reconnaissance mission over Azerbaijan, piloted by the Shah himself, and then presented Qavam with a fait accompli, forcing him to cooperate with the military advance.

Shortly afterward, Qavam's government was overthrown. He later emphasized that he had opposed the operation and that the Shah and Razmara had forced him to undertake the military campaign.

Apparently, the Shah had promised Razmara the premiership. However, Ebrahim Hakimi and subsequently Abdolhossein Hazhir became prime minister instead, and the previous closeness between the Shah and the Army Chief disappeared.

Nevertheless, the highly decorated lieutenant general had such a strong position among the military that dismissing him was considered equivalent to risking a coup similar to the one that had brought Reza Khan to power.

In an apparent effort to regain his favor, in April 1948 the Shah awarded Razmara the rank of Lieutenant General. His name was recorded in the history of the Iranian Army as the fourth person to receive this rank.

=== Prime Minister ===
Razmara was appointed prime minister by the Shah in 1950. His cabinet was inaugurated on 26 June. He promoted a plan for decentralization of government together with decentralization of the seven-year plan for infrastructure development and improvement. His idea was to bring government to the people; an unheard-of idea in Iran. His plan called for setting up local councils in Iran's 84 districts to run local affairs such as health, education and agricultural programs. One of his most enduring achievements was the institution of the Point IV program via agreement with US President Harry S. Truman.

Razmara began trimming the government payrolls, eliminating a large number of officials out of a total of 187,000 civil servants. At one stroke he terminated nearly 400 high-placed officials. By so doing, Razmarra earned the wrath of the powerful land-owning and merchant families and most conservatives without gaining the confidence of the radical Tudeh Party. Additionally, his opposition to the expropriation of AIOC assets at Abadan earned him the wrath of the small but powerful group of Majlis deputies known as the National Front. The National Front was led by Majlis Member, Mohammad Mosaddegh, whose leading ally in Parliament was the Assembly Speaker, Ayatollah Kashani.

=== Anglo-Iranian oil negotiations ===
Ali Razmara came closer than any other prime minister to ratifying the supplemental oil agreement between Iran and the Anglo-Iranian Oil Company (AIOC). The agreement drew the ire of most Iranians and Majlis of Iran deputies because it provided far less favorable terms than the Venezuela agreement between Standard Oil of New Jersey and the Venezuelan government, or the agreement between the Arabian-American Oil Company and the Saudi Arabian government. In addition, it gave continuous control of Iran's oil industry to a foreign company and country; the living and working conditions of its Iranian workers were extremely poor; it refused to allow Iranians a greater voice in the company's management; and it denied them the right to audit the company's books. The AIOC did, however, offer a few improvements: it guaranteed that its annual royalty payments would not drop below 4 million pounds; it would reduce the area where it would be allowed to drill; and it promised to train more Iranians for administrative jobs. Razmara asked Anglo-Iranian to revise some of the agreement terms, namely to allow Iranian auditors to review their financial activities, offer Iranians managerial jobs, and pay some of the royalties to the Iranian government in advance. The British refused and lost the opportunity.

Razmara was in office at the direct urging of the British Foreign Office and the AIOC to the Shah. They wanted a stronger figure than Razmara's predecessor, Prime Minister Mansur, to ensure the success of the Supplemental Agreement. "Only a man with [Razmara's] fierce determination, they believed, would be strong enough to face down Mossadegh and the National Front."

== Assassination ==
On 7 March 1951, Razmara went to the Shah Mosque for a memorial service. The police opened a corridor through the inner courtyard for him. The assassin, in the crowd, fired three quick shots, fatally wounding the Prime Minister. Khalil Tahmasebi, a member of the group Fada'iyan-e Islam, was arrested at the scene.

At a public demonstration the following day attended by more than 8,000 Tudeh Party members and National Front supporters, Fadayan-e Islam distributed leaflets carrying a threat to assassinate the Shah and other government officials if the assassin, Tahmasebi, was not set free immediately. Threats were also issued against any Majlis member who opposed oil nationalization.

The National Front was led by Mohammad Mosaddegh, who became prime minister within two months of Razmara's assassination. Ayatollah Seyyed Abol-Ghasem Kashani ended his support for the Fadayan-e Islam after the assassination. Kashani then became closer to the National Front. On the other hand, the assassin, Tahmassebi, was freed by the Iranian Parliament in 1952, but following the 1953 Iranian coup d'état, Tahmasebi was re-arrested, tried and executed in 1955.

In 1954 Navvab Safavi, founder of the Fadayan-e Islam, in a speech to the Muslim Brotherhood meeting in Egypt, declared that he himself had killed Razmara.

== Personal life ==
Razmara married Anvar ol Molouk Hedayat who was a sister of Sadegh Hedayat, an Iranian author. They had five children together. One of his sons, Nowzar, was the SAVAK’s chief of station in Cairo, Egypt, in the late 1970s.

== Notes ==
Military offices
Preceded by ?	Commander of the Independent Lorestan Brigade; 1932–1935	Succeeded by Davarpanah
New title	Head of the Geographical Department of the Army Staff; 1935–1937	Succeeded by Farajollah Aghevli
Preceded by Karim Buzarjomehri	Commander of the 1st Central Infantry Division; 1941–1943	Succeeded by Ruhollah Kikavousi
Preceded by Hasan Arfa	Chief of the Joint Staff of the Imperial Iranian Armed Forces; 23 July 1943–9 September 1943	Succeeded by Ali Riazi
Preceded by Ali Riazi	Chief of the Joint Staff of the Imperial Iranian Armed Forces; 5 May 1944–27 December 1944	Succeeded by Hassan Arfa
Preceded by Farajollah Aghevli	Chief of the Joint Staff of the Imperial Iranian Armed Forces; 1 July 1946–26 June 1950	Succeeded by Abbas Garzan
Political offices
Preceded by Ali Mansur	Prime Minister of Iran; 26 June 1950–7 March 1951	Succeeded by Hossein Ala'
Preceded by Farajollah Aghevli	Minister of Interior; 26 June 1950–20 November 1950	Succeeded by Farajollah Aghevli
