= Hossein Ala' =

Iranian politician (1881-1964)

- حسین علاء
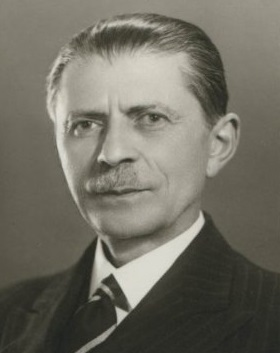

29th Prime Minister of Iran
- In office 7 April 1955 – 3 April 1957
- Monarch: Mohammad Reza Pahlavi
- Preceded by: Fazlollah Zahedi
- Succeeded by: Manouchehr Eghbal
- In office 12 March 1951 – 27 April 1951
- Monarch: Mohammad Reza Pahlavi
- Preceded by: Khalil Fahimi (Acting); Ali Razmara
- Succeeded by: Mohammed Mosaddeq

Minister of Foreign Affairs
- In office 25 April 1943 – 2 March 1945
- Prime Minister: Ebrahim Hakimi; Mohammad Sa'ed; Morteza-Qoli Bayat
- Preceded by: Mozaffar Alam
- Succeeded by: Mahmoud Salehi

Ambassador of Iran to the United States
- In office 29 November 1945 – 18 September 1950
- Prime Minister: Ali Soheili; Ahmad Qavam; Abdolhossein Hazhir; Mohammad Sa'ed
- Preceded by: Mohammad Shayesteh
- Succeeded by: Nasrollah Entezam

Member of the National Consultative Assembly
- In office 11 February 1923 – 11 February 1925
- Constituency: Tehran

Personal details
- Born: 13 December 1881 Tehran, Sublime State of Persia
- Died: 13 June 1964 (aged 82) Tehran, Imperial State of Iran
- Resting place: Imamzadeh Abdollah, Ray
- Spouse: Roghayeh Gharagozlo
- Children: 2
- Parent(s): Mohammad-Ali Ala al-Saltaneh; Fatemeh Khanoom

Hossein Ala' (Persian: حسین علاء; 13 December 1881 – 13 July 1964) was an Iranian politician and statesman who served as Prime Minister of Iran in two terms. He also served as the Foreign Minister of Iran from 1943 to 1945, and as the Iranian Ambassador to the United States from 1945 to 1950.

== Early life and education ==
He was born in 1881 in Tehran and spent his early years in London. He was educated at Westminster School and studied law at the University of London after which he was admitted to the bar at Inner Temple. He became involved in politics through a position in the Foreign Affairs Ministry of Iran.

== Career ==
In his early political life Ala served as the chef de cabinet of the Iranian foreign ministry from 1905 to 1916. Subsequently, he was a member of an Iranian diplomatic delegation sent to the Paris Peace Conference of 1919. Despite the efforts of the delegation, led by Aliqoli Massoud Ansari, and assisted ably by Ala, the British government of the time nixed Iran's hopes of officially attending the diplomatic gathering. Moreover, with the Iranian Government in Tehran having recently negotiated the Anglo-Iranian Agreement it was decided that Ansari and Ala would be banished to foreign legations to ensure they would not act as lightning rods against the agreement. Ala was appointed as the Iranian diplomatic envoy to Spain in 1920. Shortly thereafter Ala was appointed as Iran's lead diplomat in Washington where he attempted to interest American oil companies to agree to invest in Iran, to undercut the monopoly of the Anglo-Persian Oil Company.

He then became a member of parliament and was among the opposition to the fall of the Qajar dynasty.

He was the governor of Bank Melli Iran from 1933 to 1934 and from 1941 to 1942. From 1934 to 1936, Alā was ambassador to the United Kingdom. Alā was Iranian Ambassador to the United States from 1946 to 1950.

He was elected prime minister by parliament following the assassination of Haj Ali Razmara in 1951. His premiership, however, was not to last long, and he resigned less than seven weeks later on 27 April, after Mohammad Mosaddegh had submitted another oil nationalisation bill to parliament two days earlier. The issue of nationalisation was highly contentious, and Alā did not want to appear to oppose it. During his brief administration, the term of service of members of parliament was increased from 2 to 4 years. He was later appointed as Court Minister, remaining one until his death.

Alā was appointed prime minister for the second time in 1955, and in November 1955 survived an assassination attempt at the funeral of a son of Abol-Ghasem Kashani. He was replaced in April 1957 after an upsetting international incident involving the murder of three Americans by outlaw Ahmad Shah and his gang.

In 1963, the protests led by religious figures intensified in Iran due to the policies of the Shah, Mohammad Reza Pahlavi. Mohammad Ali Varasteh, Abdollah Entezam and Ala personally expressed their concerns about Shah's policies and their potential results which made all of them outsiders in the court of the Shah. In addition, Ala' and Entezam were dismissed from the Iranian Senate to which they had just appointed.

== Personal life and death ==
Alā died of pneumonia on 13 July 1964 at the age of 82. He left a son and a daughter, and was survived by his wife, who died in 1981. His son, Fereydoun Ala, was the founding director of the National Iranian Blood Transfusion Service and is honorary president of the Iranian Comprehensive Haemophilia Care Center. His daughter, Irān, is married to Eskandar Firouz, the noted authority on Iranian fauna and environmental topics.

== Honours and awards ==
- Order of the Crown, 1st class
- Grand Decoration of Honour in Gold with Sash for Services to the Republic of Austria (1958)

== See also ==
- List of ambassadors of Iran to the United States
- List of prime ministers of Iran

== References and sources ==
The following reference was used for the above writing: 'Alí Rizā Awsatí (عليرضا اوسطى), Iran in the Past Three Centuries (Irān dar Se Qarn-e Goz̲ashteh – ايران در سه قرن گذشته), Volumes 1 and 2 (Paktāb Publishing – انتشارات پاکتاب, Tehran, Iran, 2003). ISBN 964-93406-6-1 (Vol. 1), ISBN 964-93406-5-3 (Vol. 2).

Political offices
Preceded by Haj Ali Razmara	Prime Minister of Iran; 1951	Succeeded by Mohammed Mossadegh
Preceded by Fazlollah Zahedi	Prime Minister of Iran; 1955–1957	Succeeded by Manouchehr Eghbal
