= Ali Soheili =

Prime Minister of Iran (1896–1958)

- علی سهیلی
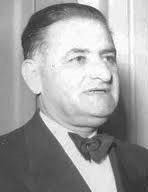

22nd Prime Minister of Iran
- In office 9 March 1942 – 9 August 1942
- Monarch: Mohammad Reza Pahlavi
- Preceded by: Mohammad-Ali Foroughi
- Succeeded by: Ahmad Qavam
- In office 15 February 1943 – 6 April 1944
- Monarch: Mohammad Reza Pahlavi
- Preceded by: Ahmad Qavam
- Succeeded by: Mohammad Sa'ed

Foreign Affairs Minister of Iran
- In office 1 October 1938 – 7 March 1939
- Prime Minister: Mahmoud Jam; Ahmad Matin-Daftari
- Preceded by: Nosrat-ed-Dowleh
- Succeeded by: Mozaffar Alam

Personal details
- Born: 1895 Tabriz, Sublime State of Persia
- Died: 1 May 1958 (aged 63) London, England, United Kingdom
- Resting place: Shah Abdol-Azim Shrine
- Party: Party for Progress
- Education: University of Tehran

Ali Soheili (Persian: علی سهیلی; 1895 – 1 May 1958) was an Iranian diplomat. He served as Prime Minister of Iran for two terms in the early 1940s.

== Biography ==
Soheili was born in Tabriz in 1895. He studied at Saint Louis school in Tehran.

Soheili served as prime minister from 9 March to 9 August 1942, and from 15 February 1943 to 6 April 1944. He was the ambassador of Pahlavi Iran to Britain in 1953.

The Tehran Conference took place during his administration.

It is written that he was well versed in the Fine Arts (music, painting). He died of cancer at the age of 62 in London.

== See also ==
- Pahlavi dynasty
- List of prime ministers of Iran

Political offices
Preceded by Nosrat ed-Dowleh	Foreign Affairs Minister of Iran; 1938–1939	Succeeded by Mozzafar Alam
Preceded by Mohammad-Ali Foroughi	Prime Minister of Iran; 1942	Succeeded by Ahmad Qavam
Preceded by Ahmad Qavam	Prime Minister of Iran; 1943–1944	Succeeded by Mohammad Sa'ed
