= Ali Mansur =

Iranian Prime Minister (1886-1974)

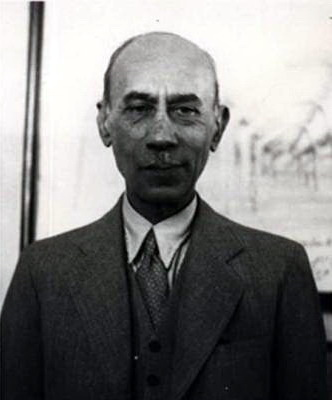

25th Prime Minister of Iran
- In office 4 April 1950 – 25 June 1950
- Monarch: Mohammad Reza Pahlavi
- Preceded by: Mohammad Sa'ed
- Succeeded by: Ali Razmara
- In office 26 June 1940 – 27 August 1941
- Monarch: Reza Shah
- Preceded by: Ahmad Matin-Daftari
- Succeeded by: Mohammad-Ali Foroughi

Personal details
- Born: 1886 Tehran, Qajar Iran
- Died: 8 December 1974 (aged 87–88) Tehran, Pahlavi Iran
- Party: Revival Party
- Children: Hassan Ali Mansur

Ali Khan Mansur (Persian: علی خان منصور, also known as Mansur ul-Mulk (منصورالملک); 1886 – 8 December 1974) was the prime minister of Iran for two terms, in 1940-1941 and again in 1950.

== Biography ==
Born in Tehran, he served as Governor of Khorasan and Azarbaijan provinces, and was an ambassador to Italy, The Vatican, and Turkey.

He served twice as Prime Minister (from 1940 to 1941, and again in 1950) and six times as Cabinet Minister. He resigned as Prime Minister several days after 25 August 1941, when British and Soviet troops invaded Iran to suppress German activity.

Before World War II, Mansur was the minister of roads and railway during construction of the Trans-Iranian Railway. After World War II, Mansur was appointed governor general of Azerbaijan in 1946 and was appointed ambassador to Turkey in 1953.

His son, Hassan Ali Mansur, served as prime minister from 1964 to 1965.

== See also ==
- List of Iranian Prime Ministers

Political offices
Preceded by Ahmad Matin-Daftari	Prime Minister of Iran; 1940–1941	Succeeded by Mohammad-Ali Foroughi
Preceded by Mohammad Sa'ed	Prime Minister of Iran; 1950	Succeeded by Ali Razmara
