= Mohammad Sa'ed =

Prime Minister of Iran (1881–1973)

- محمد ساعد
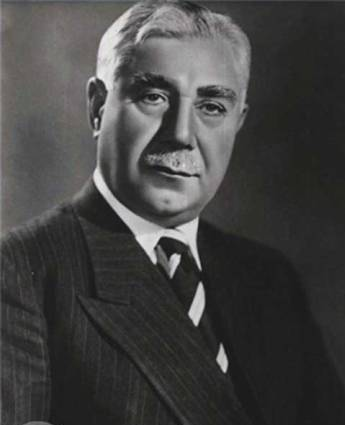

23th Prime Minister of Iran
- In office 9 November 1948 – 23 March 1950
- Monarch: Mohammad Reza Pahlavi
- Preceded by: Abdolhossein Hazhir
- Succeeded by: Ali Mansur
- In office 6 April 1944 – 25 November 1944
- Monarch: Mohammad Reza Pahlavi
- Preceded by: Ali Soheili
- Succeeded by: Morteza-Qoli Bayat

Personal details
- Born: 28 April 1881 Maragheh, Sublime State of Iran
- Died: 1 November 1973 (aged 92) Tehran, Imperial State of Iran
- Education: University of Lausanne

Mohammad Sa'ed Maraghei (Persian: محمد ساعد مراغه‌ای; 28 April 1881 – 1 November 1973) was the 23rd Prime Minister of Iran, serving from April to November 1944 and again from 1948 to 1950.

== Life ==
Sa'ed was born in Maragheh, and studied at the University of Lausanne.

Sa'ed became prime minister after the fall of Ali Soheili's cabinet in 1943. Iran–Russia relations fell to low levels during his government after Sa'ed refused to entertain a Soviet demand for an oil concession in Soviet-occupied Northern Iran. Sergey Kavtaradze publicly attacked the Prime Minister and demanded his resignation. The Soviet and Tudeh press echoed Kavtaradze's words. The Soviets inspired their Tudeh comrades in Iran to strike and demonstrate until Sa'ed resigned. Sa'ed resigned on 10 November 1944.

He banned the Tudeh Party during his premiership, and Arthur Millspaugh was also re-appointed finance minister under his administration. It is said that he used public transportation (such as bus), even when he was a senator. He was fluent in Russian, French, and Turkish.

== See also ==
- Pahlavi dynasty
- List of prime ministers of Iran

Political offices
Preceded by Ali Soheili	Prime Minister of Iran; 1944	Succeeded by Morteza-Qoli Bayat
Preceded by Abdolhossein Hazhir	Prime Minister of Iran; 1948–1950	Succeeded by Ali Mansur
