= Mohammad Reza Emami =

17th century Persian calligrapher

Mohammad Reza Emami (Persian: محمدرضا امامی) was a 17th century Persian calligrapher. He lived in the Safavid era from the reign of Abbas the Great to that of Suleiman I. He was a student of Ali Reza Abbasi and was known as the Imam of calligraphers.

Mohammad Reza Emami was Mohammad Mohsen Emami's father and Ali Naghi Emami's grandfather. All of the three calligraphers were famous for their Thuluth works in the Safavid era. Many inscriptions of the historical buildings in Isfahan, Mashhad, Qom and Qazvin have been created by them.

When Ali Reza Abbassi started to work for Abbas the Great and became his close friend, Abbas appointed him as the Thuluth script teacher of some other calligraphers like Mohammad Saleh Esfahani and Abdolbaghi Tabrizi.

He died probably in Mashhad after 50 years of working in the field of calligraphy.

== Works ==
Most of Emami's inscriptions are in Isfahan, but some of his works are also in Qom, Qazvin and Mashhad. His first inscription in Isfahan dates back to 1629 and his last inscription in Isfahan to 1670. His works from 1673 until 1676 are all in Mashhad, where he spent the last years of his life.

Mohammad Reza Emami's famous works are in the Shah Mosque. There is another inscription by Mohammad Reza Emami above the magnificent entrance of this historical mosque under a Thuluth script of Ali Reza Abbasi. An inscription on the southern dome is also Emami's work. Other works of Emami are as follows:

- in Imam Reza shrine: There are three inscriptions of Emami in the Imam Reza shrine:
  - an inscription on four slabs on the dome (above Ali Reza Abbassi's inscription). The inscription dates back to 1675 and belongs to the era of Suleiman I. The inscription mentions that there was an earthquake and the dome became cracked and some reparations and decorations were carried out on the dome.
  - An inscription in the southern iwan.
  - Baysunghur's inscription (Shah Rukh's son), which was repaired by Emami.
- in the Goharshad Mosque: in the middle of Goharshad mosque.
- in the Hakim mosque:
  - a white Thuluth script on the ultramarine tiles above the northern entrance. The inscription dates back to 1662.
  - an inscription in the iwan: It shows some sentences from Koran and also Mohammad Reza Emami's name. It dates back to 1660.
  - an inscription on the dome from 1658.
  - an inscription near the mihrab from 1660.
  - an inscriptionin in the eastern shabestan from 1658.
  - an inscription in the northern iwan from 1660.
  - an inscription in the western iwan with some sentences from Koran and Emami's name from 1662.
- in the Agha Nour Mosque: There is an inscription by Emami above the entrance, which dates back to 1629. It is mentioned in the inscription, that the founder of mosque, Nour ed-Din Mohammad Esfahani, was a benefactor and began the construction of mosque during the era of Abbas I, but it was completed in the first year of King Safi's reign.
- in the Lonban Mosque:
  - There are some white Thuluth lines on the ultramarine background of two tiles. The lines date back to 1669.
  - Above the entrance, there are also some poems with white Nastaliq scripts on the ultramarine tiles. They date back also to 1669. According to the inscription, the mosque was repaired in the King Suleiman's era.
- in the Mesri Mosque: An inscription on the marble board with embossed Nastaliq script, which shows some poems and its last hemistich, the date 1651 has been mentioned.
- in the Maghsoudbeyk Mosque: an inscription, which the names of Abbas I and Maghsoudbeyk was mentioned in.

In total, 29 inscriptions on Isfahan's historic buildings are Mohammad Reza Emami's works.
