= Aboutorab Esfahani =

Persian calligrapher (1581–1662)

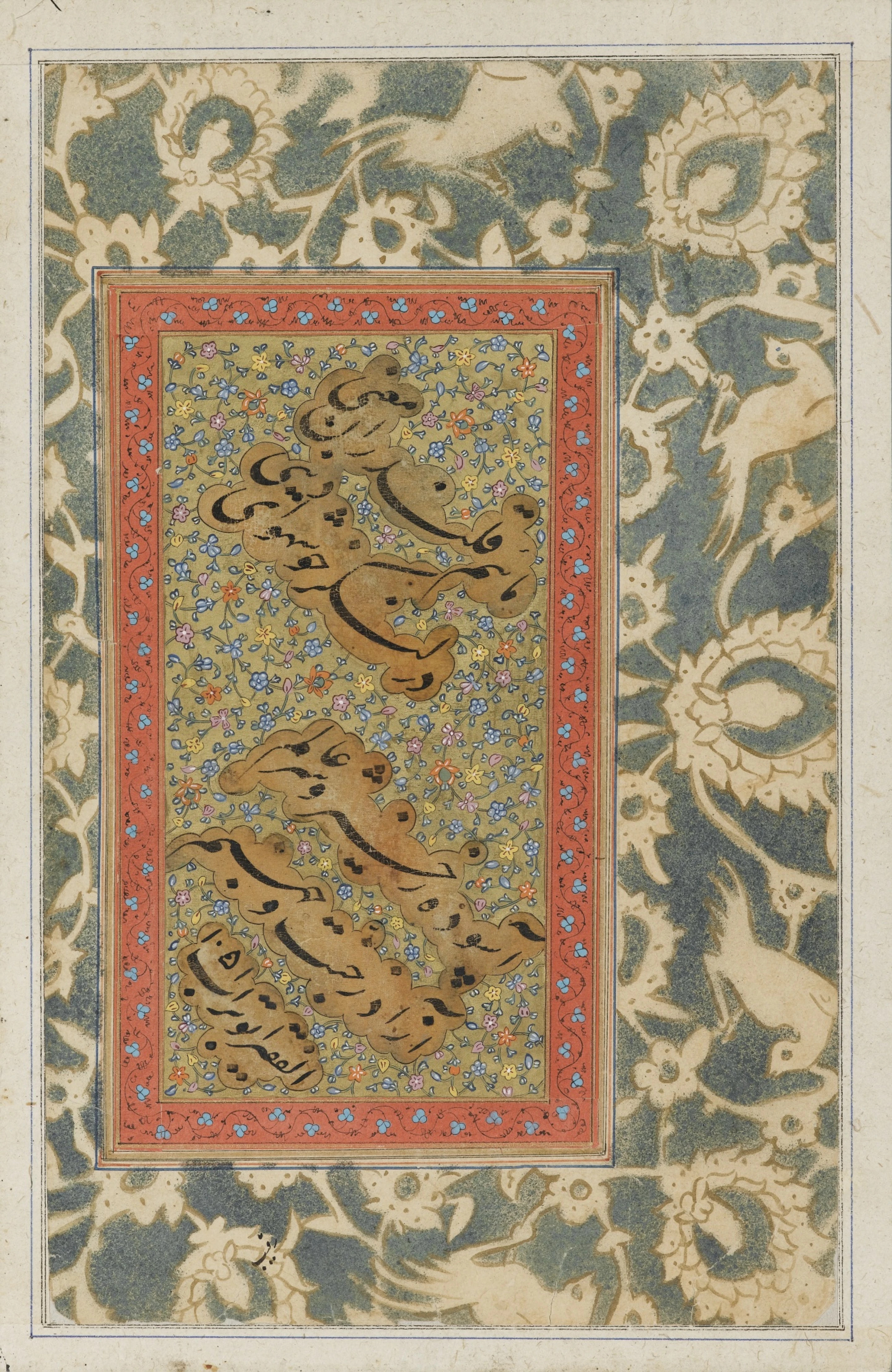
Calligraphy by Aboutorab Esfahani. Created in Safavid Iran, dated 1640 or 1641

Aboutorab Esfahani, pseudonym: Toraba, (Persian: ابوتراب اصفهانی; 1581–1662) was a prominent Persian calligrapher of the Nastaliq script and one of the most important calligraphy students of Mir Emad.

== Biography ==
Aboutorab Esfahani was born in a great rich family in Isfahan. His birth date has not been mentioned in historical documents, but since his death age has been mentioned as 83 in one of Mirza Sanglakh's works, he must have been born in 1581.

His first calligraphy teacher was Molla ALi Fayezi (death: 1626). Then Esfahani continued his education with Mir Emad. Esfahani became one of the most successful students of Mir Emad. When Mir Emad was killed in 1615, he was the only person who dared to bury his body.

After Mir Emad's death, he became the most famous Persian calligrapher and taught many calligraphers. His most famous students were Mohammad Mohsen Emami, His own sons Nour ed-Din Mohammad Esfahani and Mohammad Saleh Esfahani.

He died in 1662 at the age of 83 in Isfahan and was buried in the Lonban Mosque.
