= Regency Council =

Regency Council may refer to:

- Regency Council (Iran) (1979)
- Regency Council (Poland) (1917–1918)

== See also ==
- Council of Regency of Spain and the Indies (1808–1810)
