= 1800 in Iran =

- Decades
- See also: Other events of 1800; Years in Iran

The following lists events that happened during 1800 in Qajar era.

== Incumbents ==
- Monarch: Fath-Ali Shah Qajar

== Births ==
- May 13 – Morteza Ansari, Iranian Shia jurist.
- ? – Aga Khan I, politician.
- ? – Mirza Mohammad-Ali Sanglakh, Iranian calligrapher.
- ? – Mirza Muhammed Ibrahim, Iranian educator.
