= Nour ed-Din Mohammad Esfahani =

Persian calligrapher (d. 1683)

Nour ed-Din Mohammad Esfahani (Persian: نورالدین محمد اصفهانی; died 1683) was a prominent Persian calligrapher. He lived in the 17th century. He was from Isfahan. He was Aboutorab Esfahani's son and Mohammad Saleh Esfahani's brother, who were both also famous calligraphers. He died in 1683.
