= Mohammad Ibrahim al-Karbasi =

Shi'ite jurist and reviver (1766–1845)

Grand Ayatollah Mohammad Ibrahim al-Karbasi (al-kalbasi)
- الشيخ محمد ابراهيم الكرباسی (الکلباسی)
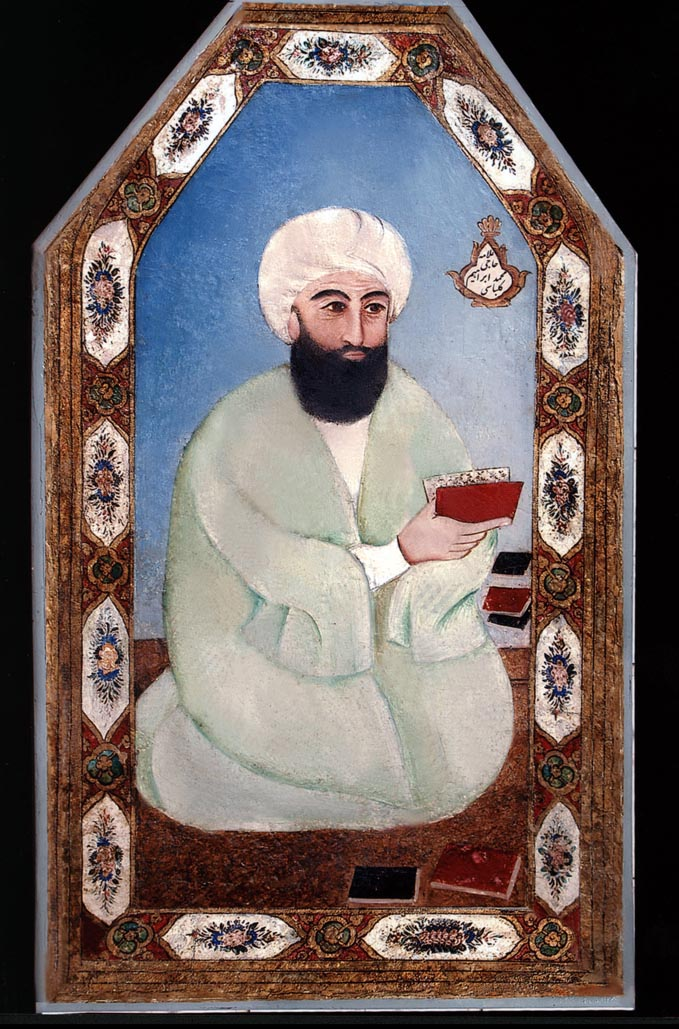

Personal life
- Born: 24 September 1766 Isfahan, Iran
- Died: 15 May 1845 (aged 78) Isfahan, Iran
- Resting place: Hakim Mosque, Isfahan
- Other name: Sahib al-Isharat (Arabic: صاحب الاشارات)
- Occupation: Shia Islam jurist, mujtahid, Marja' of Twelver Shia Islam

Religious life
- Religion: Islam

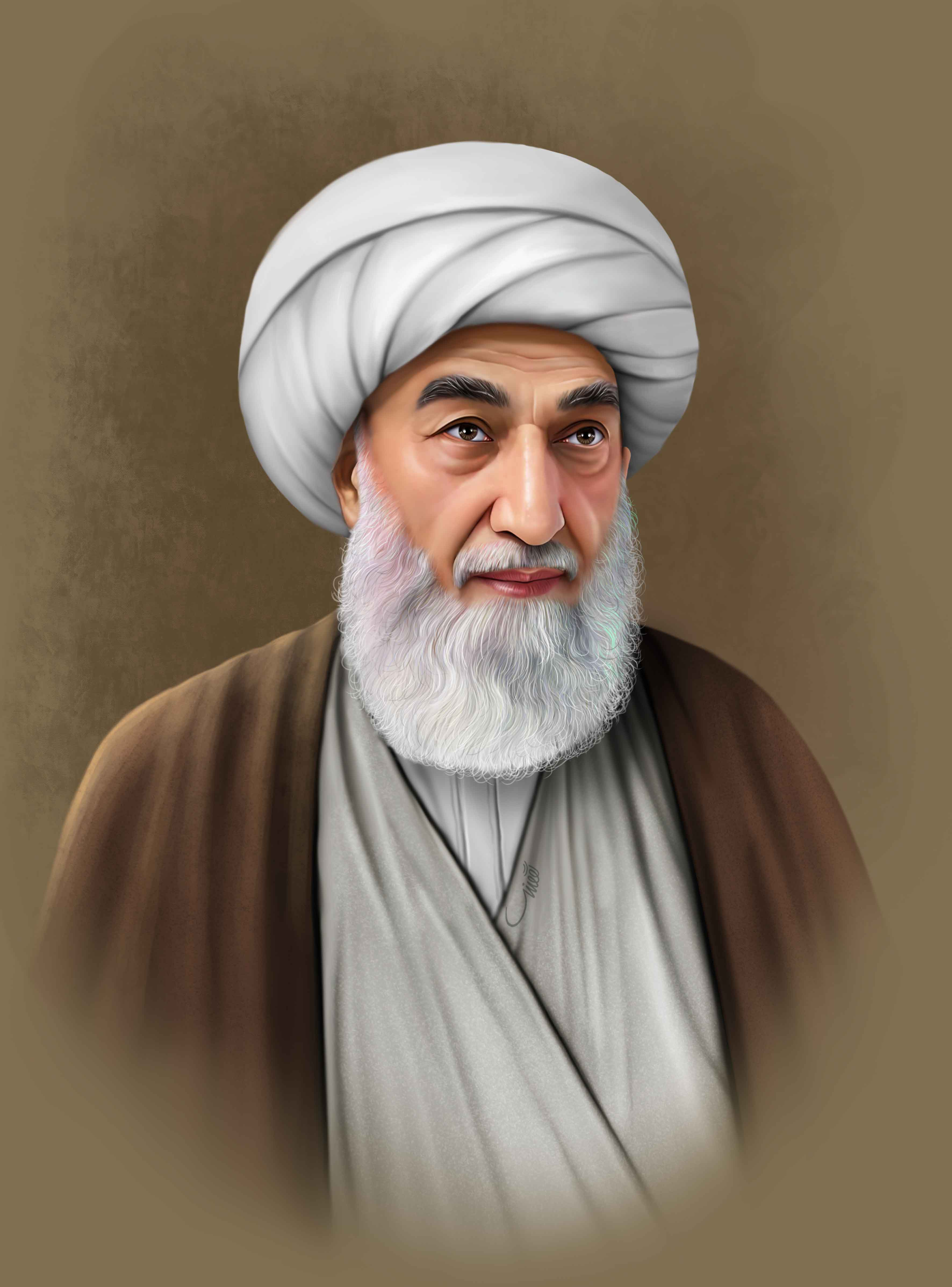
mohammad ibrahim kalbasi is by abbas godarzi

Grand Ayatollah Sheikh Mohammad Ibrahim al-Karbasi (kalbasi) (Arabic: محمد إبراهيم الكرباسي; Persian: محمدابراهیم کرباسی; 1766–1845) known as Sahib al-Isharat (Arabic: صاحب الإشارات) was a Shia jurist, mujtahid, fundamentalist, Quran commentator, theologian, scholar of biographical evaluation and marja', and considered the reviver of the Isfahan Seminary in the 19th century.

== Early life and education ==
Al-Karbasi was born on 24 September 1766 in Isfahan, Iran, to Sheikh Muhammad-Hasan al-Karbasi. The Karbasi family claim descent from Malik al-Ashtar, the noble companion of the first Shia Imam, Ali. His father died when he was ten years old.

He went on to study under Agha Muhammad Bidabadi. He then travelled across a number of cities to acquire knowledge, and this included, Karbala, Najaf, Kadhimiya, Qom, and Kashan. In these cities, he studied under greats like Sheikh Muhammad-Baqir Behbehani, Sayyid Muhammad-Mehdi Bahr al-Uloom, Sheikh Jafar Kashif al-Ghita, and Sheikh Muhammad-Mehdi al-Naraqi.

Al-Karbasi excelled in his studies, and managed to make an exceptional connection between Islamic mysticism, which was taught by his teacher, Binabadi, as well as Usulism, which was founded by his teacher, Behbehani.

Also, his most famous masters in Isfahan are:

1. Mulla Ali Noori Mazandarani
2. Mulla Mehrab Gilani
3. Mirza Mohammad Ali MirzaMozaffar
4. Mir Mohammad Hossein Khatoonabadi
5. Sheikh Mohammad Ali Harandi
6. Sheikh Mohammad ibn Sheikh Zeynoddin

== Religious career ==
al-Karbasi became an expert in several fields of Islamic sciences. He taught Fiqh and Principles of Islamic jurisprudence in the Hakim Mosque of Isfahan, and in this field, raised many students who among them are:

1. Sheikh Hadi Sabzavari
2. Mirza Shirazi
3. Mohammad ibn Soleiman Tonekaboni
4. Sayyid Hassan Modarres Isfahani
5. Sheikh Mahdi Qomsheh'ee
6. Sayyid Mohammad Shahshahani
7. Sheikh Hamzeh Qaeni
8. Sayyid Muhammad-Hassan Mojtahed Isfahani

== Works ==
Ayatollah Mohammad Ibrahim Kalbasi, along with his educational, training and propaganda efforts, was engaged in writing and researching and has written works in the field of Fiqh, Principles of Islamic jurisprudence and other Islamic teachings, which include:

1. Esharat al-Osul (Arabic: اشارات الاصول, title means: Signs of the Usul)
2. Ershad al-Mostarshedin fi Marefateh men Ahkam al-Din (Arabic: ارشاد المسترشدین فی معرفه من احکام الدین, title means: The guidance of the guides in the knowledge of the rules of religion)
3. Al-Nokhbeh (Arabic: النخبه, title means: The elite)
4. Menhaj al-Hedayah ela Ahkam al-Sharia va Forooe al-Fiqh (Arabic: منهاج الهدایه الی احکام الشریعه و فروع الفقه, title means: The curriculum of guidance to the provisions of Sharia and the branches of jurisprudence)
5. Al-Soal va al-Javab fi al-Fiqh va al-Ahkam (Arabic: السؤال و الجواب فی الفقه و الاحکام, title means: Question and answer in jurisprudence and rulings)
6. Shawarie al-Hidayah fi Sharh al-Kefayah al-Muqtasid (Arabic: شوارع الهدایه فی شرح الکفایه المقتصد, title means: Ways of guidance in the explanation of the frugal sufficiency)
7. Taqlid al-Meyyet (Arabic: تقلید المیت, title means: The dead tradition)
8. Al-Iqaazaat (Arabic: الایقاضات, title means: The adjournments)
9. Resaleh ee dar Sahih va Aam; Dar Elme Osule Feqh (Persian: رساله ای در صحیح و اعم؛ در علم اصول فقه, title means: A treatise on the correct and general; In the science of the principles of jurisprudence)
10. Naqd al-Usul (Arabic: نقد الاصول, title means: Critique of principles)
11. Manaseke Hajj (Persian: مناسک حج, title means: Hajj rituals)
12. Resaleh ee dar Mofattar Boodane Qelyan ya Tootoon (Persian: رساله ای در مفطر بودن قلیان یا توتون, title means: A treatise on the nullifier of hookah or tobacco)

At the insistence of the people and the insistence of the jurists and authorities of the time, such as Mirza-ye Qomi, he published a treatise of "Nokhbeh" (Persian: نخبه, title means: The elite), which is the first collections of juridical edicts or clarifications of questions (Risalah (fiqh)) in Persian.

== Social actions ==
He was one of the opponents of the Sufi orders in Isfahan. It is also said that he warned Fath-Ali Shah Qajar and some rulers of the time for neglecting the masses and monitoring the prices of goods.

== Death ==
Al-Karbasi died on the night of Thursday, 15 May 1845, at the age of 78, and according to his will, he was buried in a place in front of the Hakim Mosque, in the family's crypt.

== See also ==
- Mirza-ye Qomi
- Seyyed Mohammad Hojjat Kooh Kamari
- Sayyed Ibrahim Estahbanati
- Agha Hossein Khansari
- Mohammad Jafar Sabzevari
- Mohaghegh Sabzevari
