= Mirza Mahmud Khan Hakim ol-Molk =

Iranian politician and physician (1856 – 1903)

Moshir ol-Hokama Mirza Mahmud Khan Hakim ol-Molk
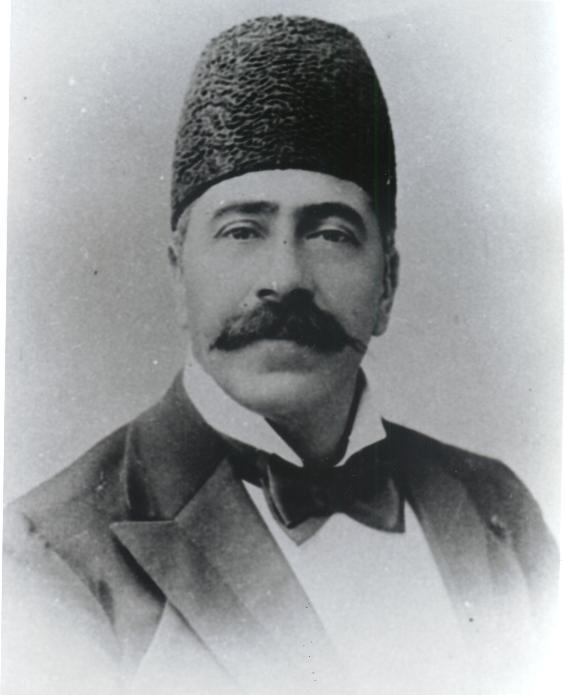
- Photograph of Mirza Mahmud Khan Hakim ol-Molk

Minister of Court
- In office 1900–1905
- Monarch: Mozaffar ad-Din Shah Qajar
- Preceded by: Gholam-Hossein Khan Ghaffari
- Succeeded by: Amir Bahador Jang

Personal details
- Born: 1856 Borujerd, Iran
- Died: August 1903 (aged 46–47) Rasht, Iran
- Relatives: Hakim Daud (ancestor); Mirza Hasan Hakim-bashi (brother); Ebrahim Hakimi (nephew)

Mirza Mahmud Khan Hakim ol-Molk (Persian: میرزا محمود خان حکیم الملک; 1856 – 1903) was an Iranian politician and personal physician of Mozaffar ad-Din Shah Qajar (r. 1896–1907).

== Biography ==
Mirza Mahmoud Khan was born on 1856 to Mirza Ali-Naqi Hakim-Bashi in Borujerd. Mirza Ali-Naqi Hakim-Bashi was son of Mirza Hassan Hakim-Bashi Isfahani. His paternal ancestor, Hakim Daud was one of the renowned physicians of the Safavid era. Mahmoud Khan was also the uncle of Ebrahim Hakimi, who served as Prime Minister during the Pahlavi era.

=== Education and Start of career ===
Mahmoud Khan entered the Dar os-Saltaneh State School in Tabriz in 1875, where he studied the fundamentals of mathematics and natural sciences. Demonstrating his aptitude by passing the relevant examinations, he was subsequently summoned to Tehran. With the support of the Tabriz administration, he then spent six years at Tehran's Dar al-Fonun diligently studying mathematics, geography, French language and natural sciences, followed by medicine and surgery, before returning to Tabriz. Mahmoud Khan studied medicine at Tehran's Dar al-Funun under the French physician Dr. Tholozan and served as an assistant to Dr. Mohammad, a medical graduate from the University of Paris. Subsequently, he entered to the service of Mozaffar ad-Din Mirza during his tenure as Crown Prince, serving as his personal physician.

According to the daily memoirs of Mohammad Hasan Khan E'temad os-Saltaneh, Mahmoud Khan Hakim ol-Molk also gained medical knowledge, directly or indirectly from Jean-Baptiste Feuvrier, the French physician to Naser al-Din Shah.

== Career ==
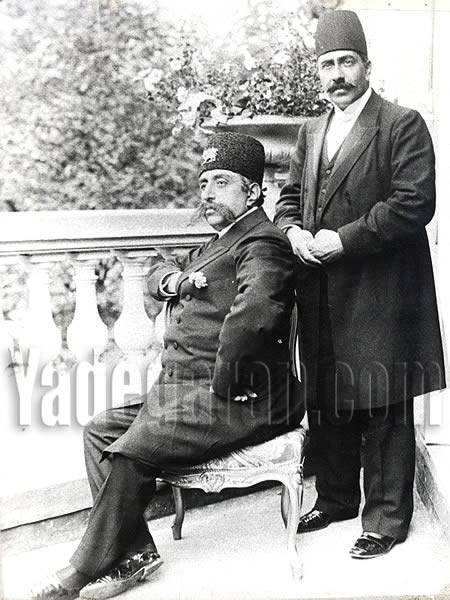
Mozaffar ad-Din Shah (seated) and Hakim ol-Molk

Following the death of Mirza Abolhassan Hakim-Bashi, Mozaffar ad-Din Mirza included Mahmoud Khan among his personal physicians in 1885. In 1886, Mozaffar ad-Din granted him title Moshir ol-Hokama. Mahmoud Khan received the title Hakim ol-Molk in 1896 following the accession of Mozaffar ad-Din Shah Qajar, he was appointed Chief of the Imperial Physicians (Ra'is ol-Atebba).

Shah's growing favor toward Hakim ol-Molk resulted in conferral of numerous decorations, ranks and titles upon him. These included a distinguished jewel-encrusted cane from the Royal Treasury, along with a royal decree (Namat-e khosravani) appointing Mirza Mahmoud Khan as Minister of Coinage and Minister of the Imperial Court.

== Sources ==
- Ebrahimi, Zahra (2019). "حکیم الملک". The Great Islamic Encyclopaedia (in Persian).
- Milani, Abbas (2003). "Ḥakimi, Ebrāhim". In Yarshater, Ehsan (ed.). Encyclopædia Iranica (Online ed.). Encyclopædia Iranica Foundation. ISBN 978-0933273719.
- Bamdad, Mehdi (2005). Alizadeh Ashkouri, Zabihollah (ed.). شرح حال رجال ایران در قرن ۱۲ و ۱۳ و ۱۴ هجری [Biographies of Iranian Notables in the 12th, 13th and 14th Hijri Centuries] (in Persian) (1st ed.). Tehran: Ferdows. ISBN 9789643201395.
- Churchill, George Percy (1990). فرهنگ رجال قاجار [Dictionary of Qajar Notables] (in Persian). Tehran.
- E'temad al-Saltaneh, Mohammad Hasan Khan (1966) [1345 SH]. Ruz-nama-ye khaterat-e E'temad al-Saltaneh [The Diary of E'temad al-Saltaneh] (in Persian). Tehran: Amir Kabir Publishers.
- Afzal al-Molk, Gholam Hossein (1982) [1361 SH]. Afzal al-Tavarikh [The Best of Histories] (in Persian). Tehran: Tarikh-e Iran.
