= Regency Council (Iran) =

Carried out duties of Shah of Iran, 13–22 January 1979

The Regency Council (Persian: شورای سلطنت, romanized: Šūrā-ye Salṭanat) of the Imperial State of Iran, was a nine-member body formed on 13 January 1979 by Shah Mohammad Reza Pahlavi to carry out his duties after he left Iran amidst the Iranian Revolution and served as the symbol of his continued claim on power.

The council was practically dissolved within days, when its head resigned on 22 January 1979 to meet Ayatollah Ruhollah Khomeini.

== Background ==
=== 1953 Regency Council ===
On 28 February 1953, it was reported that in a meeting with Prime Minister Mohammad Mosaddegh, the Shah had agreed that during his absence in Iran a regency council consisting of Mosaddegh, Gholamreza Pahlavi (Shah's brother) and Hossein Ala' (Minister of Royal Court) should be appointed to act as the regency council.

== 1979 Regency Council members ==
#	Name	Latest Office	Position in the Council
1	Jalaleddin Tehrani	Former Senator	Head
2	Mohammad Ali Varasteh	Former Minister of Finance	Deputy
3	Shapour Bakhtiar	Prime Minister	Member
4	Mohammad Sajjadi	President of the Senate	Member
5	Javad Saeid	Speaker of the Parliament	Member
6	Gen. Abbas Gharabaghi	Chief of the Joint Staff of the Imperial Iranian Army	Member
7	Aligholi Ardalan	Minister of the Royal Court	Member
8	Abdollah Entezam	Former Chairman of National Iranian Oil Company	Member
9	Abdolhossein Ali Abadi	Former Prosecutor-General	Member

Tehrani resigned from the post due to tensions between him and Abbas Gharabaghi. He was replaced by Mohammad Ali Varasteh as the head of the council.

== See also ==
- Council of the Islamic Revolution
