= Aligholi Ardalan =

Iranian diplomat (1900–1986)

- علیقلی اردلان

Minister Foreign Affairs
- In office 8 April 1955 – 1959
- Prime Minister: Hossein Ala'; Manouchehr Eghbal

Minister of Royal Court
- In office 7 September 1978 – 11 February 1979
- Preceded by: Amir-Abbas Hoveyda

Member of Regency Council
- In office 13 January 1979 – 22 January 1979
- Appointed by: Mohammad Reza Pahlavi

Personal details
- Born: 25 January 1900 Tehran, Sublime State of Iran
- Died: 2 August 1986 (aged 86)

Aligholi Ardalan (Persian: علیقلی اردلان; also Romanized as Aliqoli Ardalan; 25 January 1900 – 2 August 1986) was one of the leading Iranian diplomats of his generation. He served as the minister of industry, the cabinet minister for foreign affairs and as ambassador to the United States, the Soviet Union, and West Germany. He was also managing director of the National Iranian Oil Company for Southern Iran.

== Biography ==
Ardalan was born in Tehran on 25 January 1900. From 1924 to 1927 he served as deputy of the Iranian embassy in Berlin. He received a Doctorate from Frederick Wilhelm University, Berlin (now Humboldt University of Berlin) having written his thesis on the 'Position of Iranians in the world economy' (dated 23 November 1929) in impeccable German. He joined the Iranian Ministry of Foreign Affairs at the age of 30, and became political officer at the Iranian Embassy in Washington DC. From 14 May 1958 to 16 March 1960 he functioned as ambassador to the United States. Then he was appointed Iran's ambassador to the Soviet Union.

Ardalan was the only Iranian diplomat during the Cold War who served at the United Nations, Washington and Moscow during his tenure as diplomat. He was fluent in German, French, English, Kurdish and Persian.

== Personal life ==
In 1939, Ardalan married Mehri Esfandiary, granddaughter of Haj Mohtasham Saltaneh Esfandiari, President of the Majles for many years. They had two sons: Manoutchehr and Cyrus.
