= Morteza-Qoli Bayat =

Iranian politician

- مرتضی‌قلی بیات
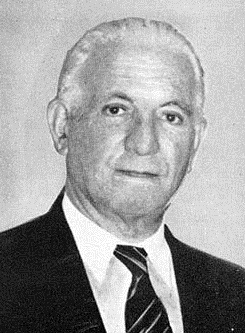

24th Prime Minister of Iran
- In office 25 November 1944 – 13 May 1945
- Monarch: Mohammad Reza Pahlavi
- Preceded by: Mohammad Sa'ed
- Succeeded by: Ebrahim Hakimi

Personal details
- Born: 1890 Arak, Sublime State of Iran
- Died: 10 May 1958 (aged 68) Tehran, Imperial State of Iran
- Resting place: Najaf, Iraq
- Party: Reformers' Party (1920s)

Morteza Gholi Bayat (Persian: مرتضی‌قلی بیات; 1890–10 May 1958), also known as Sahām al-Soltān, was the Prime Minister of Iran for 5 months and 20 days in 1944. He was succeeded by Ebrahim Hakimi.

In 1925, he became Minister of Finance under Prime Minister Mohammad Ali Foroughi. He was a member of the Parliament of Iran from Arak. He was the founder of the Democratic Party of Arak.

He was buried in Najaf, Iraq.

== See also ==
- Pahlavi dynasty
- List of prime ministers of Iran

Political offices
Preceded by Mohammad Sa'ed	Prime Minister of Iran; 1944–1945	Succeeded by Ebrahim Hakimi
