= Lonban =

Neighbourhood in Isfahan, Iran

Coordinates: 32.65078°N 51.64825°E

Lonban (Persian: لنبان) is one of the oldest districts of Isfahan in Iran. This district is famous for Lonban Mosque.
