= Amir Bahador Jang =

Iranian Statesman (c.1855–1918)

Amir Hoseyn-Pasha Khan
- حسینپاشا خان
- Portrait, before 1900

Minister of War
- In office August 1906 – 28 August 1906
- Monarch: Mozaffar ad-Din Shah Qajar
- Preceded by: Kamran Mirza
- Succeeded by: Mohammad Taqi Dabir al-Dawla
- In office 22 July 1908 – 2 May 1909
- Monarch: Mohammad Ali Shah Qajar
- Preceded by: Mostowfi ol-Mamalek
- Succeeded by: Mostowfi ol-Mamalek

Minister of Court
- In office 1903 or 1904 – ?
- Monarch: Mozaffar ad-Din Shah Qajar
- Preceded by: Mirza Mahmud Khan Hakim ol-Molk
- Succeeded by: Gholam-Hossein Khan Ghaffari

Personal details
- Born: c. 1855 Azerbaijan, Iran
- Died: 1918 Tehran, Iran
- Parent: Mohammad-Sadeq Khan Qarabaghi Ajudanbashi (father)

Military service
- Allegiance: Qajar Iran
- Rank: Commander-in-chief
- Battles/wars: Persian Constitutional Revolution

Hoseyn-Pasha Khan (Persian: حسین پاشا خان; ca. 1855 – 1918) mainly known by his title Amir Bahador Jang (Persian: امیر بهادر جنگ, lit. 'The valiant commander of war') was a high-ranking Iranian statesmen of the Qajar era who served as Chief of Royal Guard, Minister of Court, and Minister of War under Mozaffar ad-Din Shah Qajar and Mohammad Ali Shah Qajar.

== Life ==
Hoseyn-Pasha was born in c. 1855 to a military family in Azerbaijan. He was a son of Mohammad-Sadeq Khan Qarabaghi Ajudanbashi, a descendant of Haj Kazem Khan Tofangdar.

== Military Service ==
In 1885, Hoseyn-Pasha was entered to the service of Crown Prince Mozaffar ad-Din Mirza in Tabriz. In same year he became Yuzbashi (captain). In 1886, he was promoted to the rank of Qollar-Aghasibashi (Lord of Slaves); retaining the latter title, in 1309/1891–92 he also became Chief Adjutant (Ajudanbashi) to the crown prince in his capacity as Brigadier general and was called Ajudanbashi-e Azerbaijan. In 1892 or 1893, he received the title of Amir Bahador Jang.

== Reign of Mozaffar ad-Din Shah ==
During Mozaffar al-Din Shah’s reign, in 1896 or 1897, he first replaced Abdollah Khan Qajar Nezam os-Saltaneh as Chief of Royal Bodyguard (Keshikchibashi). In 1903, he was promoted to the rank of Sardar and later replaced Mirza Mahmud Khan Hakim ol-Molk as the Minister of Court. Under the army reorganization plan in early 1905 he was given the command of about 9,000 men stationed chiefly in Kerman, Isfahan, and Fars.

=== Shah Abdol-Azim bast ===
In December 1909, protests began in Shah Abdol-Azim Shrine, including clergy and merchants who demanded the dismissal of Prime Minister Soltan Abdol Majid Mirza Eyn od-Dowleh. Amir Bahador was sent with a large cavalry in an unsuccessful mission to appease the protestors. Protests resulted in further consolidation of the opposing party, protestors also demanded the removal of Belgian citizen M. Naus from the control of Persian customs and, more importantly, the establishment of a House of justice, this bast was also prelude of Constitutional movement.

Due to Mozaffar al-Din Shah's immense confidence in Amir Bahador, he became an influential figure at court and amassed a great fortune; he also accompanied the shah on his three visits to Europe in 1900, 1902 and 1905.

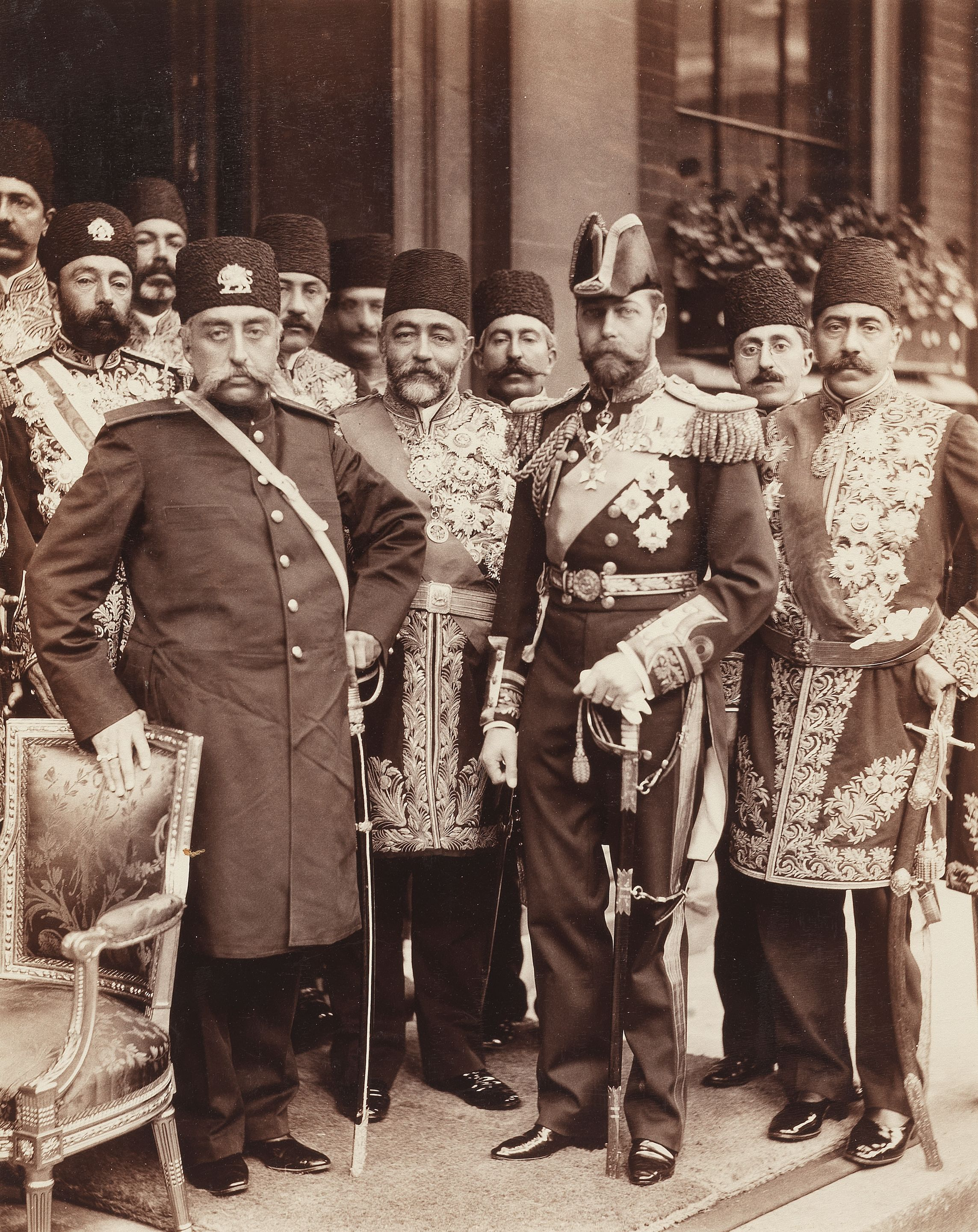
Mozaffar ad-Din Shah with the Prince of Wales, later King George V, Amir Bahador behind the Shah, 1909

== Reign of Mohammad Ali Shah ==
After Mohammad Ali Shah's accession, Amir Bahador was first ignored by shah, but Anti-Constitutionalist zeal soon drew them together and he was reappointed to Command the royal bodyguard. His oath of allegiance to the First Majles on 1 October 1907 did not alter his highly unpopular image with the Constitutionalists who later attributed the shah's abortive coup d'état of December 1907, to his influence. By early 1908, Amir Bahādor gained full control over Silakor regiment, stationed in and around the palace.

=== Persian Constitutional Revolution ===
Following constitutionalist demonstrations in late May 1908, he was temporarily removed from office but continued cooperating with the shah against the Constitutionalists. He later took control of the royal artillery and helped strengthen the forces based at Bagh-e Shah, the headquarters of the anti-Constitutionalist faction. After the Bombardment of the Majlis, Amir Bahador was appointed Commander-in-chief (Sepahsalar-e Azam) and became Minister of War for the second time. During the counter revolutionary period, he became one of the most influential figures at court and was described by British officials as one of the most powerful men in Persia. Under pressure from Britain and Russia, he was later removed from office but remained close to the shah.

== Aftermath and Death ==
After the Triumph of Tehran on 13 July 1909, Amir Bahador followed Mohammad Ali Shah into exile. Due to his opposition to the Constitutional movement, he was excluded from the general amnesty and accompanied the former shah in attempts to regain power. He participated in Mohammad Ali Shah's failed revolt attempt in 1911, later settled in Vienna and eventually returned to Tehran, where he died in 1918.

== Sources ==
- Mafi, Hossein-Qoli Khan Nezam al-Saltanah (1983). خاطرات و اسناد حسینقلی خان نظام‌السلطنه مافی; Memoirs and Documents of Hossein-Qoli Nezam al-Saltaneh Mafi (in Persian). Vol. 1. Tehran: Nashr-e Tarikh-e Iran.
- Bamdad, Mehdi (1968). شرح حال رجال ایران در قرن ۱۲ و ۱۳ و ۱۴ هجری; Biography of Iran's Political Figures in 12th, 13th and 14th Hijri Centuries (in Persian). Vol. 1. Tehran: Ketabforushi-ye Zovvar.
- Mogith al-Saltana, Yusuf (1983). نامه‌ها; Letters (in Persian). Tehran: Nashr-e Tarikh-e Iran.
- Nazem al-Islam Kermani, Muhammad ibn Ali. تاریخ بیداری ایرانیان; The History of the Awakening of the Iranians (in Persian). Vol. 2.
- Kasravi, Ahmad (1940a). تاریخ مشروطه ایران; History of the Iranian Constitutional Revolution (in Persian). Tehran: Amir Kabir Publishers.
- Browne, Edward Granville (1910). The Persian Revolution of 1905–1909. Cambridge: Cambridge University Press.
- Browne, Edward Granville (1914). The Press and Poetry of Modern Persia. Cambridge: University Press.
- Kasravi, Ahmad (1940b). تاریخ هیجده ساله آذربایجان (Tarikh-e Hejdah-Saleh-ye Azarbayjan; The 18 Year History of Azerbaijan) (in Persian). Tehran: Amir Kabir Publishers.
- Gheissari, Ali (1988). "BAHĀDOR JANG, AMIR". In Yarshater, Ehsan (ed.). Encyclopædia Iranica (Online ed.). Encyclopædia Iranica Foundation.
