= Ministry of the Royal Court =

Former Iranian ministry

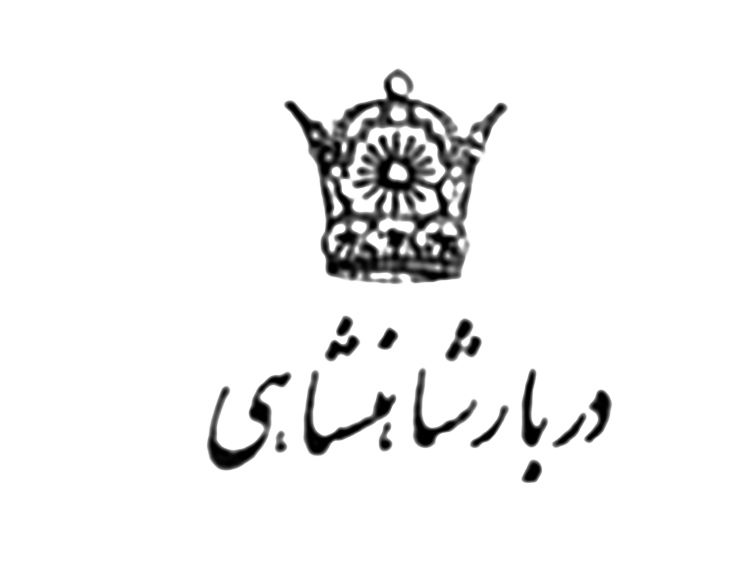
- The emblem of the Ministry of the Royal Court

Ministry overview
- Formed: 1866
- Dissolved: 11 February 1979
- Jurisdiction: Qajar Iran; Pahlavi Iran
- Headquarters: Tehran
- Annual budget: $40 million (1976–77)
- Ministers responsible: Mohammad Naser Khan, first Minister of the Royal Court; Aligholi Ardalan, last Minister of the Royal Court

The Ministry of the Royal Court (Persian: وزارت دربار شاهنشاهی) was an organization in Iran that acted as an intermediary between the Shah of Iran and government branches, including the cabinet and the parliament. It was founded under the Qajar dynasty and was abolished after the Iranian Revolution in 1979. It was extensively powerful during the Pahlavi dynasty, and had an executive arm named the 'Special Bureau'.

The minister of court never sat the in cabinet meetings, however his position ranked on par with Prime Minister of Iran.

== List of ministers ==
Portrait	Name	Tenure	Notes
Qajar dynasty
	Mohammad Naser Khan	1866–1867	
	Mohammad Rahim Khan	1875–1881	
	Agha Ebrahim Amin os-Soltan	1881–1882	
	Ali Asghar Khan Amin al-Soltan	1882–1889	
	Gholam-Hossein Khan Ghaffari	1896–1897	
	Mirza Mahmud Khan	1900–1905	
	Hoseyn Pasha Khan	1903/04–?	
	Gholam-Hossein Khan Ghaffari	Feb–Mar 1907 – ?	2nd time
	Soltan-Ali Vazir-e Afkham	?	
	Mostowfi ol-Mamalek	1909–1911	
Pahlavi dynasty
	Abdolhossein Teymourtash	1925–1932	
Dissolution of the Ministry of the Imperial Court (1932–1939)
	Mahmoud Djam	1939–1941	
	Mohammad Ali Farzin	1941–1942	
	Mohammad Ali Foroughi	1942	
	Hossein Ala'	1942–1945	
	Ebrahim Hakimi	? – 1947	
	Mahmoud Djam	1947 – ?	2nd time
	Abdolhossein Hazhir	July 1949 – February 1949	
	Ebrahim Hakimi	1949–1950	2nd time
	Hossein Ala'	1950	2nd time
	Hossein Ala'	1951–1953	3rd time
	Abol Ghasem Amini	April 1953 – August 1953	
	Hossein Ala'	1953–1955	4th time
	Manouchehr Eghbal	1956–1957	
	Hossein Ala'	1957–1963	5th time
	Hossein Ghods-Nakhai	1963–1967	
	Asadollah Alam	1967–1977	
	Amir-Abbas Hoveyda	1977–1978	
	Aligholi Ardalan	1978–1979	

== See also ==
- Royal Households of the United Kingdom
- Maison du Roi (France)
- Royal Household and Heritage of the Crown of Spain
- Ministry of the Imperial Court (Russia)
- Ministry of the Imperial Household (Japan)
