= Ebrahim Hakimi =

Iranian politician (1869–1959)

- ابراهیم حکیمی
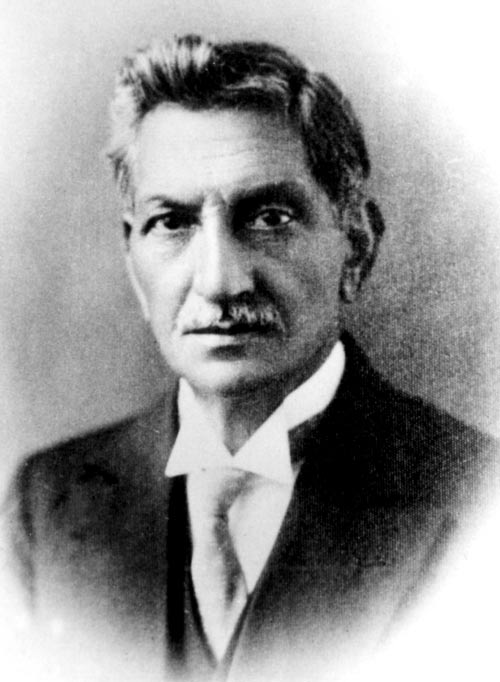

25th Prime Minister of Iran
- In office 29 December 1947 – 13 June 1948
- Monarch: Mohammad Reza Pahlavi
- Preceded by: Ahmad Qavam
- Succeeded by: Abdolhossein Hazhir
- In office 30 October 1945 – 28 January 1946
- Monarch: Mohammad Reza Pahlavi
- Preceded by: Mohsen Sadr
- Succeeded by: Ahmad Qavam
- In office 13 May 1945 – 6 June 1945
- Monarch: Mohammad Reza Pahlavi
- Preceded by: Morteza-Qoli Bayat
- Succeeded by: Mohsen Sadr

President of Senate
- In office 19 August 1951 – 1 March 1957
- Preceded by: None
- Succeeded by: Hasan Taqizadeh

Personal details
- Born: 1869 Tabriz, Sublime State of Persia
- Died: 19 October 1959 (aged 89–90) Tehran, Imperial State of Iran
- Party: Revival Party (1920s); Democrat Party (1910s)
- Education: Paris University

Ebrahim Hakimi (Persian: ابراهیم حکیمی; 1869 – 19 October 1959) was an Iranian politician and statesman who served as Prime Minister of Iran on three occasions.

== Early life and education ==
Born in Tabriz in 1869, Ḥakimi was part of "an old and prominent family of court physicians", who traced their status as far back as the 17th century, "starting with the eponym of the family, Moḥammad-Dāvud Khan Ḥakim" who served at the courts of the Safavid shahs Safi (r. 1629-1642) and Abbas II (r. 1642-1666). This ancestor of Ebrahim was also the founder of the Hakim Mosque in Isfahan. Hakimi's uncle was Mirza Mahmud Khan Hakim ol-Molk, a politician and personal physician of Mozaffar ad-Din Shah Qajar (r. 1896–1907).

After finishing elementary and high school in Tabriz, Hakimi attended Dar ol-Fonoon in Tehran and finished advanced studies in medicine in Paris.

== Career ==
Hakimi served as royal physician to Mozaffar ad-Din Shah Qajar. He then became a member of the Parliament, and served as cabinet minister 17 times, as prime minister for three terms, and as speaker of the Senate of Iran.

His second tenure as prime minister was short-lived (three months) as the Soviets, angry over his refusal to grant them an oil concession in Northern Iran, inspired Azerbaijani Communists to declare independence from Iran. Soviet troops occupying the Northern regions refused to allow Iranian troops to enter the region to put down the uprising. Hakimi submitted the issue to the UN Security Council and resigned from office in protest of Soviet actions in January 1946.

== Death ==
Hakimi died in Tehran in 1959.

== See also ==
- Pahlavi dynasty
- List of prime ministers of Iran

== Sources ==
- Ebrahimi, Zahra (2019). "حکیم الملک". The Great Islamic Encyclopaedia (in Persian).
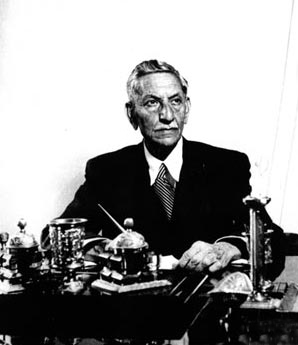
- Ebrahim Hakimi
  Milani, Abbas (2003). "ḤAKIMI, EBRĀHIM". Encyclopaedia Iranica. Vol. XI. pp. 575–580.
- 'Alí Rizā Awsatí (عليرضا اوسطى), Iran in the Past Three Centuries (Irān dar Se Qarn-e Goz̲ashteh – ايران در سه قرن گذشته), Volumes 1 and 2 (Paktāb Publishing – انتشارات پاکتاب, Tehran, Iran, 2003). ISBN 964-93406-6-1 (Vol. 1), ISBN 964-93406-5-3 (Vol. 2).

Political offices
Preceded by Morteza-Qoli Bayat	Prime Minister of Iran; 1945	Succeeded by Mohsen Sadr
Preceded by Mohsen Sadr	Prime Minister of Iran; 1945–1946	Succeeded by Ahmad Qavam
Preceded by Mohammad-Reza Hekmat	Prime Minister of Iran; 1947–1948	Succeeded by Abdolhossein Hazhir
New title	President of Senate; 1951–1957	Succeeded by Hasan Taqizadeh
