= Sayyed Ibrahim Estahbanati =

Mirza Agha Ibrahim Estahbanati Shirazi (died Hijra 1379) was a Shia Islam Jurist and religious scholar in Iran.

== Early life ==
He was born in Estahbanat in Fars province in Iran at 1279 lunar Hijrah. He was inspired by his father who was a religious authority.

He was educated in the religious school of Estahbanat. He studied under teachers such as Shaykh Muhammad Baqir Estahbanati, Mirza Muhammad Baqir Estahbanati and Shaykh Jafar Mahallati in Disciplines like Fiqh and principles.

He continued his education in Najaf . He learned Fiqh from eminent scholars such as Mohammed Kazem Yazdi, Muhammad Kazim Khorasani, Mirza Muhammad Taqi Shirazi and others.

== Career ==
He was selected as the authority of Shia minority after the death of Mirza Muhammad Taqi Shirazi. He was appointed to the authority of Iran, India and Pakistan and other countries near the Persian gulf.

He participated in political activities and supported Fadaian Islam and individuals such as Sayyed Mojtaba Navvab Safavi.

He taught students such as Banu Nosrat Amin, Sayyed Shahab Al Din Mar'ashi Najafi, Shaykh Ibrahim Kalbasi, Shaykh Moslem Malakouti Tabrizi, Sayyed Muhammad Hasan Taliqani. He wrote many books in disciplines such as jurisprudence and principles:

- Glosses on "Orvat Al Vosqa"
- Glosses on "Zakhirat Al Ibad"
- The book of Taharat
- The book of Pilgrimage
- The book of Khoms
- Some problems on convictions

== See also ==
- Fadayan-e Islam
- Mohammad Ibrahim Kalbasi
