= Lonban Mosque =

Shi'ite mosque in Isfahan, Iran

- مسجد لنبان
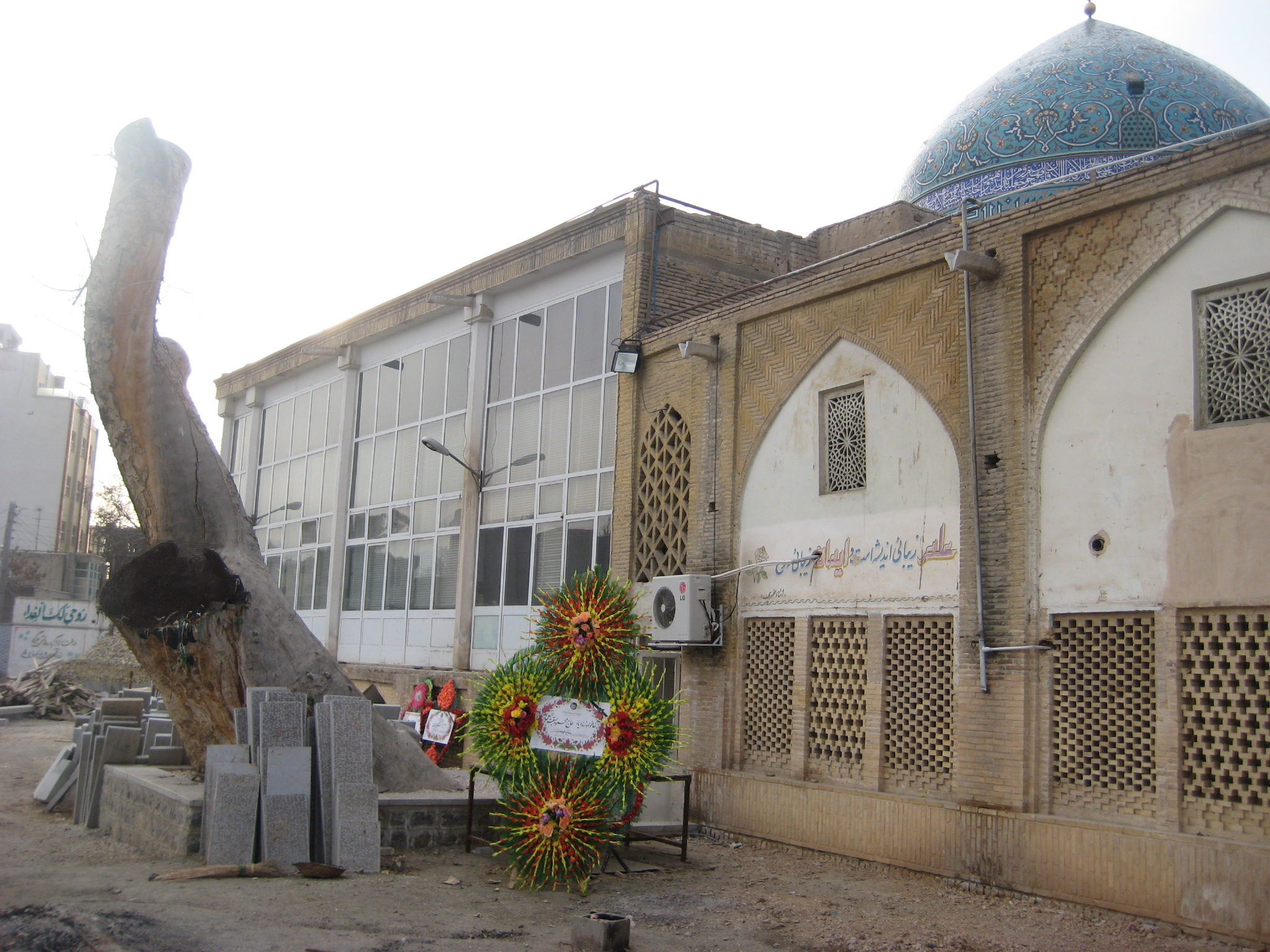
- The mosque dome

- Location of the mosque in Iran

Religion
- Affiliation: Shia Islam
- Ecclesiastical or organisational status: Mosque
- Status: Active

Location
- Location: Lonban, Esfahan, Isfahan Province
- Country: Iran
- Coordinates: 32°39′04″N 51°39′07″E

Architecture
- Type: Mosque architecture
- Style: Rashidun (possibly); Safavid (renovation); Qajar
- Founder: Suleiman I of Persia
- Completed: 7th century (possibly); 1670 CE (renovation); 1702 CE (minbar); 1840 CE (annex)

Specifications
- Dome: One
- Minaret: One
- Materials: Bricks; plaster; timber (column); tiles

Iran National Heritage List
- Official name: Lonban Mosque
- Type: Mosque
- Designated: 1937
- Reference no.: 293
- Conservation organization: Cultural Heritage, Handicrafts and Tourism Organization of Iran

The Lonban Mosque (Persian: مسجد لنبان) is a Shi'ite mosque, located in the historic Lonban quarter of Esfahan, in the province of Isfahan, Iran.

Its current structure was rebuilt in the contemporary era, but some of the plaster works and paintings are from the Safavid age. Some of the inscriptions on the portal are the art works of Mohammad Reza Emami. There is an extraordinary wooden minbar which is one of the most exquisite artworks of the Safavid dynasty. Aboutorab Esfahani, a calligrapher of the Safavid era, was buried in the mosque.

The mosque was added to the Iran National Heritage List on 20 December 1937, administered by the Cultural Heritage, Handicrafts and Tourism Organization of Iran.

== See also ==
- Shia Islam in Iran
- List of mosques in Iran
