= Hakim Daud =

Iranian physician (d. 1662/63)

- حکیم داوود
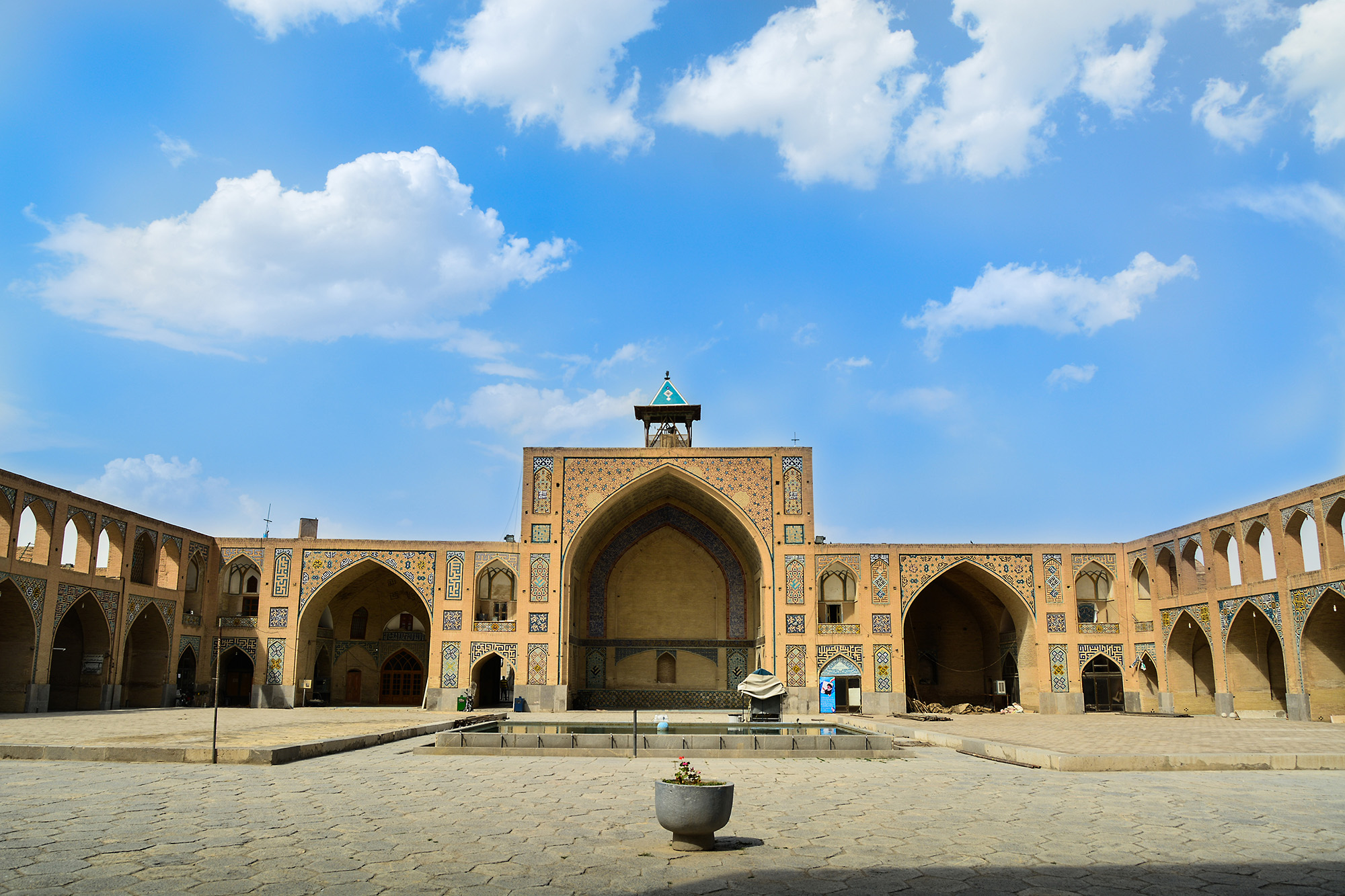
- The Hakim Mosque in 2017, founded by Hakim Daud
- Born: Safavid Iran
- Died: 1662/63; Mughal Empire
- Occupation: Physician
- Known for: The construction of the Hakim Mosque
- Relatives: Mirza Mahmud Khan Hakim ol-Molk and Ebrahim Hakimi (descendants)

Hakim Daud, also spelled Davud, (Persian: حکیم داوود; died 1662/63) was a physician in Safavid Iran and the Mughal Empire.

His father and mother served as physicians under the Safavid rulers Shah Abbas I and Shah Safi. Hakim Daud served as the physician of Shah Abbas II. Dissatisfied with his position, he emigrated to India, where he got a promotion after successfully treating the daughter of the Mughal emperor Shah Jahan for a burn.

In 1656, while still in India, Hakim Daud funded the construction of the Hakim Mosque in Isfahan, which was completed in 1663. He died before its completion, in 1662/63.

The Iranian court physicians and politicians Mirza Mahmud Khan Hakim ol-Molk and Ebrahim Hakimi were his descendants.

== Sources ==
- Newman, Andrew J. (2008). Safavid Iran: Rebirth of a Persian Empire. I.B.Tauris. ISBN 978-0857716613.
- Milani, Abbas (2003). "Ḥakimi, Ebrāhim". In Yarshater, Ehsan (ed.). Encyclopædia Iranica (Online ed.). Encyclopædia Iranica Foundation. ISBN 978-0933273719.
