= Goharshad Ghazvini =

Persian calligrapher

Goharshad Ghazvini, also known as Goharshad Hassani Ghazvini, was a Persian calligrapher of Nastaʿlīq script in the 17th century. She was Mir Emad's daughter. She learned calligraphy when she was a teenager and learned Nastaʿlīq script from her father.

After her father's death, she went in 1623 to her birthplace, Qazvin, Iran, and worked as a calligraphy teacher, dying there in 1628.
