= Mesri Mosque =

Shi'ite mosque in Isfahan, Iran

- مسجد مصری
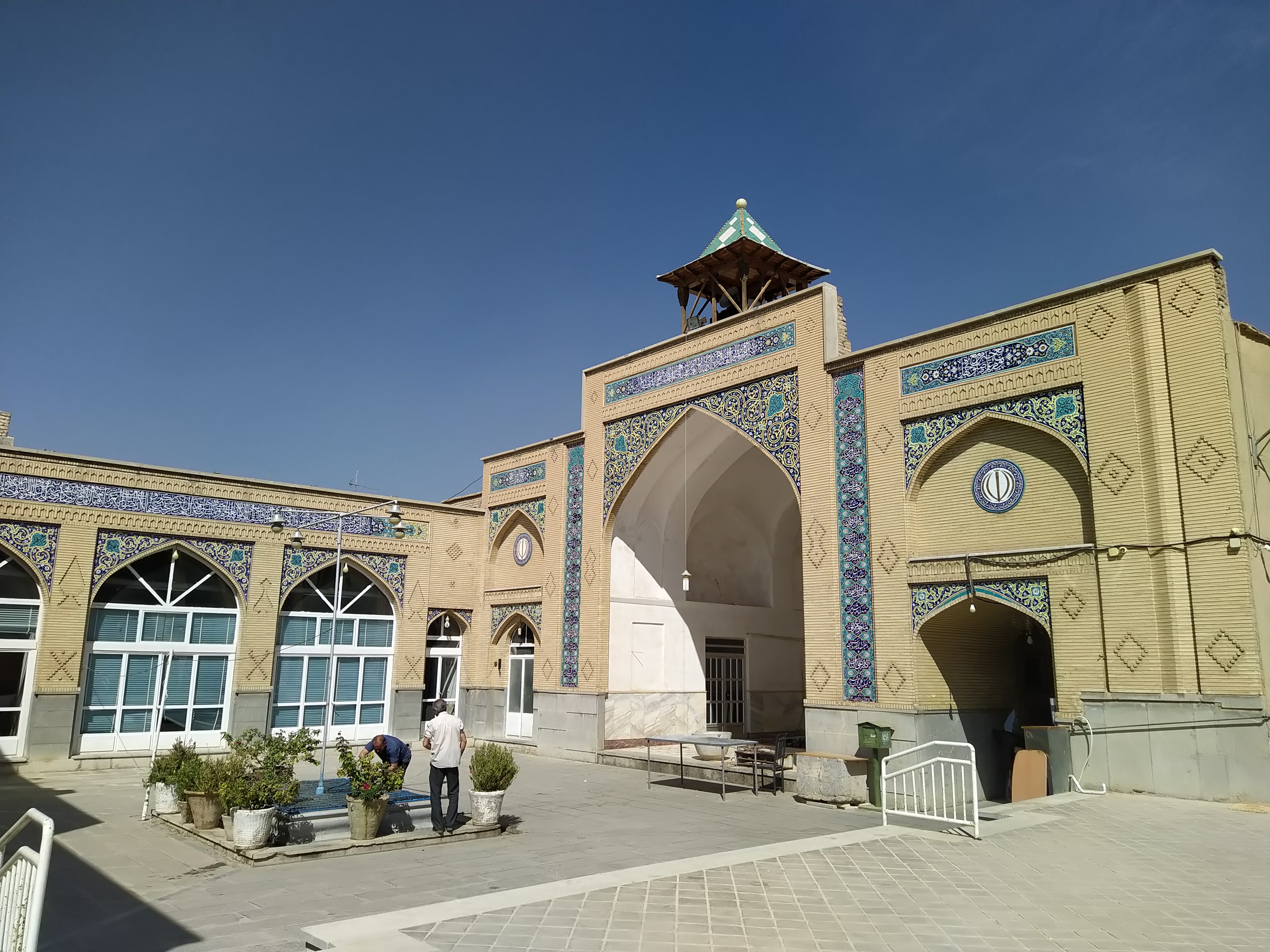
- The mosque sahn, iwan, and turret, in 2021

- Location of the mosque in Iran

Religion
- Affiliation: Shia Islam
- Ecclesiastical or organisational status: Mosque
- Status: Active

Location
- Location: Esfahan, Isfahan Province
- Country: Iran
- Coordinates: 32°40′26″N 51°41′29″E

Architecture
- Type: Mosque architecture
- Style: Isfahani / Safavid
- Completed: 1061 AH (1650/1651 CE); 1973 (renovations)

Specifications
- Spire: One (turret)
- Materials: Bricks; mortar; tiles

Iran National Heritage List
- Official name: Mesri Mosque
- Type: Mosque
- Designated: 1937
- Reference no.: 279
- Conservation organization: Cultural Heritage, Handicrafts and Tourism Organization of Iran

The Mesri Mosque (Persian: مسجد مصری) is a Shi'ite mosque, located in Esfahan, in the province of Isfahan, Iran. The mosque was built in 1061 AH (1650/1651 CE), during the Safavid era. In the mihrab there is an inscription in Nastaliq script, written by Mohammad Reza Emami, a calligrapher .

The mosque was added to the Iran National Heritage List on 3 March 1937, administered by the Cultural Heritage, Handicrafts and Tourism Organization of Iran.

Located in front of the mosque is the holy shrine of Haji Mir Hassan, which bears an inscription of 788 AH (1386/1387 CE).

== See also ==
- Shia Islam in Iran
- List of mosques in Iran
- List of historical structures in Isfahan
