= Maghsoudbeyk Mosque =

Shi'ite mosque in Isfahan, Iran

- مسجد مقصودبیک
- Location of the mosque in Iran

Religion
- Affiliation: Shia Islam
- Ecclesiastical or organisational status: Mosque
- Status: Active

Location
- Location: Zolamat Alley, Esfahan, Isfahan Province
- Country: Iran
- Coordinates: 32°39′32″N 51°40′40″E

Architecture
- Type: Mosque architecture
- Style: Isfahani / Safavid
- Founder: Maghsoudbeyk
- Groundbreaking: 1601 CE
- Completed: 1010 AH (1601/1602 CE)

Specifications
- Dome: One (maybe more)
- Inscriptions: Two (highly decorative)
- Materials: Tiles

The Maghsoudbeyk Mosque (Persian: مسجد مقصودبیک; Arabic: مسجد مقصودبيك), also known as the Maqsud Beyk Mosque (Note: Also known as the Maghsoud Beik Mosque.) and as the Zolamat Mosque, is a Shi'ite mosque, located on Zolamat Alley near the northeastern corner of Naqsh-e Jahan Square, in Esfahan, in the province of Isfahan, Iran.

The mosque was established in 1010 AH (1601/1602 CE) and opened the following year, by the order of Maghsoudbeyk, (Note: Also spelled as Maghsoud Beik Nazer.) a wealthy steward of Abbas I. There is an inscription in the mihrab which is one of artworks of Ali Reza Abbassi, a calligrapher of the Safavid era. It's said, after that Shah Abbas was very satisfied with this inscription, he ordered Ali Reza Abbassi to work on the inscriptions of Sheikh Lotfollah Mosque.

== Architecture ==
The mosque is designed on the principle of a domed Shabestan in which there is a decorative portal with ceramic tiles at the entrance. Inside the mosque, the large altar is slightly damaged.

The inscription at the entrance of the mosque is dated as 1010 AH (1601/1602 CE), and is written in Suls calligraphy on a white and azure background with the handwriting of Jafar Ali Emami. The names of Shah Abbas I and Maghsoudbeyk are mentioned in this inscription. The southern Shabestan of the mosque is decorated with tile decorations. The altar has also an inscription, dated as 1011 AH (1602/1603 CE) in white Suls calligraphy on an azure background.

Behind the entrance hall of the mosque in a small chamber, there's a tomb which is the tomb of Mir Emad, the art rival of Ali Reza Abbassi. The tomb doesn’t have any inscription, but there is a piece of marble stone installed vertically on the wall that some poems in Persian and Salawat for the Fourteen Infallibles were written with Suls and Nastaliq calligraphy.

== See also ==
- Shia Islam in Iran
- List of mosques in Iran
