= Mir Emad Hassani =

Persian calligrapher

Mir Emad Hassani میرعماد حسنی قزوینی
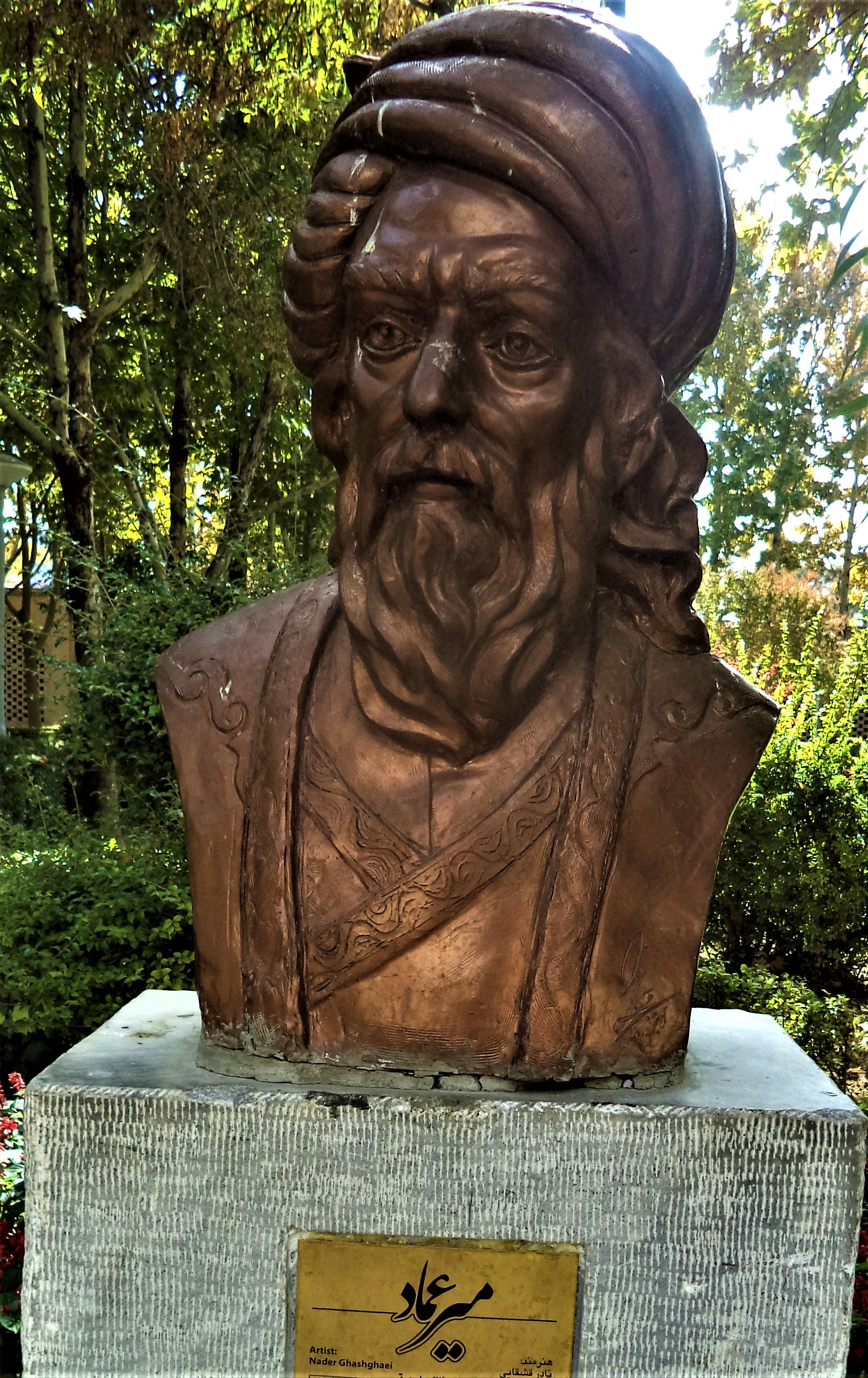
- Bust of Mir Emad Hassani
- Born: 1554 CE Qazvin, Safavid Iran
- Died: 1615 (aged 60–61) Isfahan, Safavid Iran
- Occupation: Calligraphy
- Period: Safavid period
- Genre: Persian Calligraphy

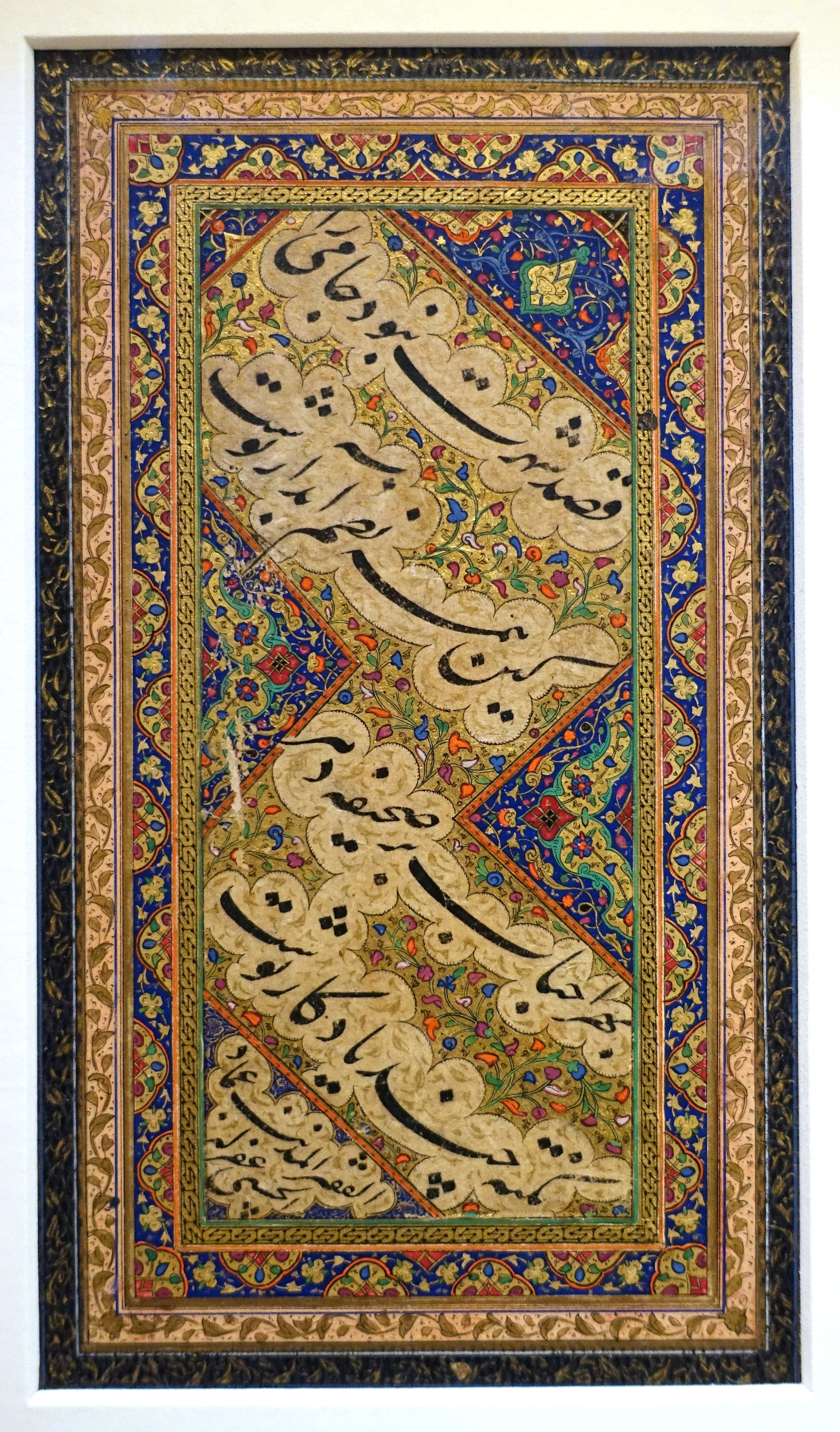
Album leaf signed by Imad al-Hassani, c. 1600 CE

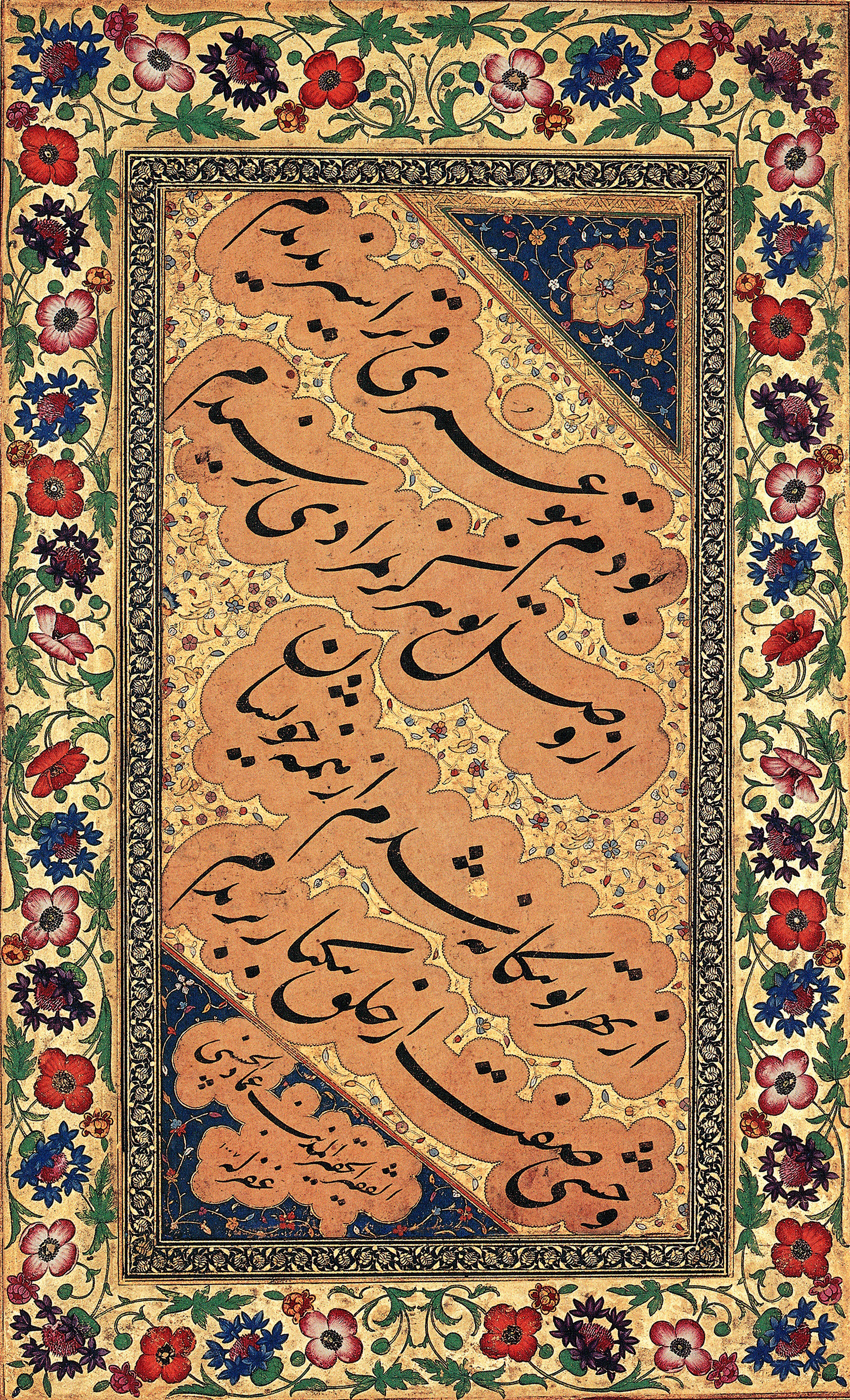
Chalipa panel of Mir Emad

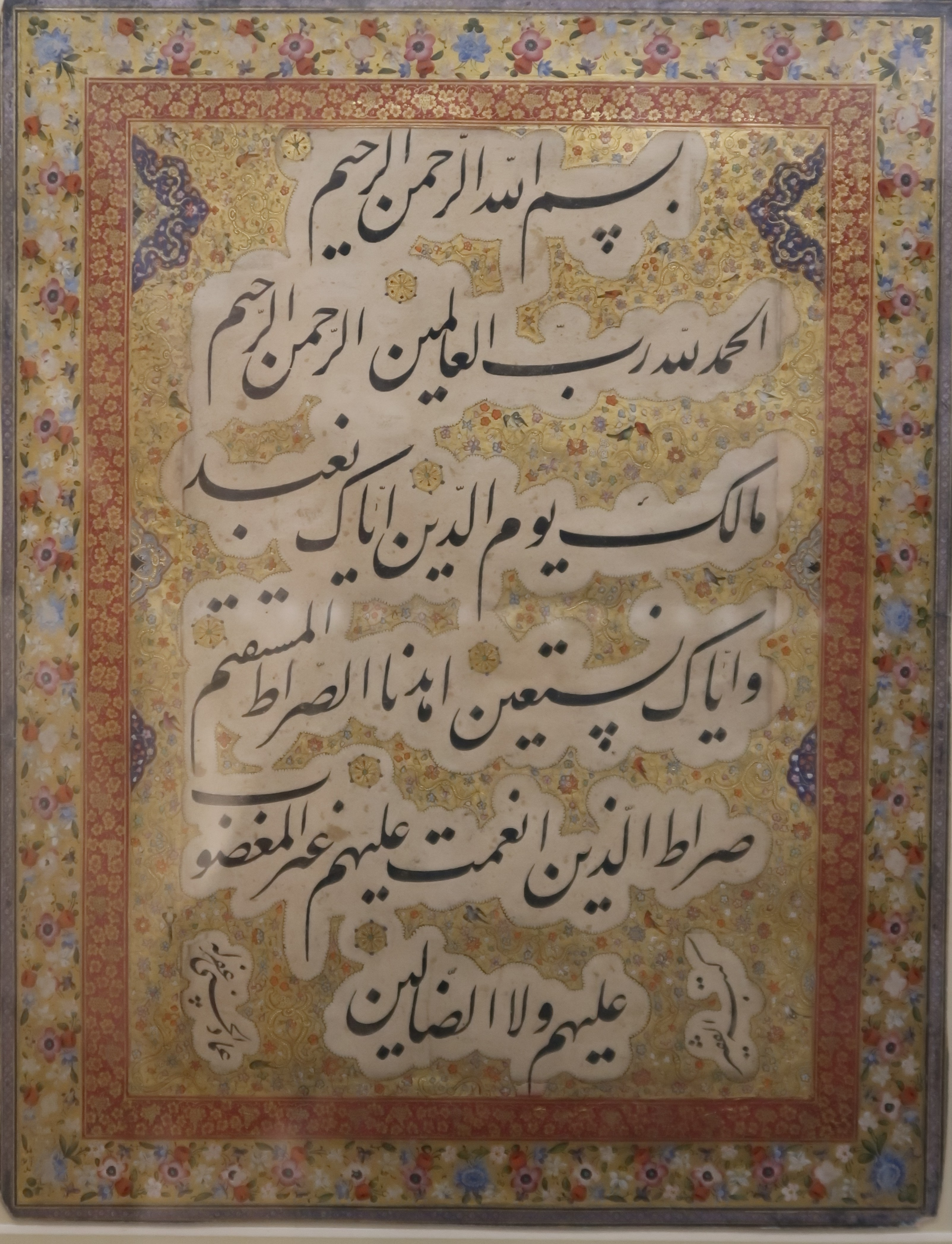
Al-Fatiha

Mir Emad (born Emad al-Molk Qazvini Hasani (Persian: میرعماد حسنی قزوینی), 1554 – August 15, 1615) is perhaps the most celebrated Persian calligrapher. He was born in Qazvin, Iran. It is believed that the Nastaʿlīq style reached its highest elegance in Mir Emad's works. These are considered amongst the finest specimens of Nastaʿlīq calligraphy and are kept in several museums in the world.

== Early life and education ==
Mir Emad was born in Qazvin, where he had his early education. Mir Emad's family had librarian and accountant positions in the Safavid court. He was trained in calligraphy at first by Isa Rangkar and then Malek Deylami. Later on, Mir Emad moved to Tabriz to study with Mohammad Hossein Tabrizi. Afterward, he traveled to Ottoman Turkey, Baghdad, Halab and Hijaz. He returned to Semnan and worked as a scribe in Shah Abbas's library and later on his court in the capital of Isfahan.

== Rivalry with Ali Reza Abbasi ==
In Shah Abbas's court, Mir Emad was not the only calligrapher. Ali Reza Abbasi Tabrizi, another famous calligrapher, was also under the shah's patronage. Ali Reza Abbasi's was also a pupil of Mohammad Hossein Tabrizi (Mir Emad's teacher) and later on became Mir Emad's opponent.

== Death ==
Mir Emad was later accused of being Sunni, a branch of Islam which was not tolerated under the Safavids, and implicitly sentenced to death by Shah Abbas. At night, on his way to Hamam, Mir Emad was assassinated by Masoud Bek Mesgar Qazvini and for several days no one dared to bury his corpse. Finally his pupil, Aboutorab Esfahani, buried him in Maghsoudbeyk mosque. He was not allowed to build a mausoleum for Mir Emad.

== Works and legacy ==
"Adab al-Masq", a dissertation on penmanship, is attributed to Mir Emad. Goharshad, Mir Emad's daughter, was also an adept calligrapher. So was her husband, Mir Mohammad Ali and her sons Mir Rashid, Mir Abd al-Razzaq and Mir Yahya. Mir Emad's son, Mirza Ebrahim, is also known to be a calligrapher. So is Mohammad Amin, Mirza Ebrahim's son.

== See also ==
- Persian calligraphy
