= Mohammad Mohsen Emami =

16th–17th century Persian calligrapher

Mohammad Mohsen Emami (Persian: محمدمحسن امامی) was a famous Persian calligrapher of the Thuluth script in the Safavid era. He was Mohammad Reza Emami's son and Ali Naghi Emami's father, who were also the famous calligrapher of the Thuluth script.

Many inscriptions of Mohammad Mohsen Emami still exist on the historical buildings of Isfahan. Although Emami was very skillful in Nastaliq and Naskh, but he is mostly famous for his Thuluth works. He lived in the era of Suleiman I and Soltan Hoseyn.
