= Hakim Mosque, Isfahan =

Mosque in Isfahan, Iran

Hakim Mosque
- مسجد حکیم
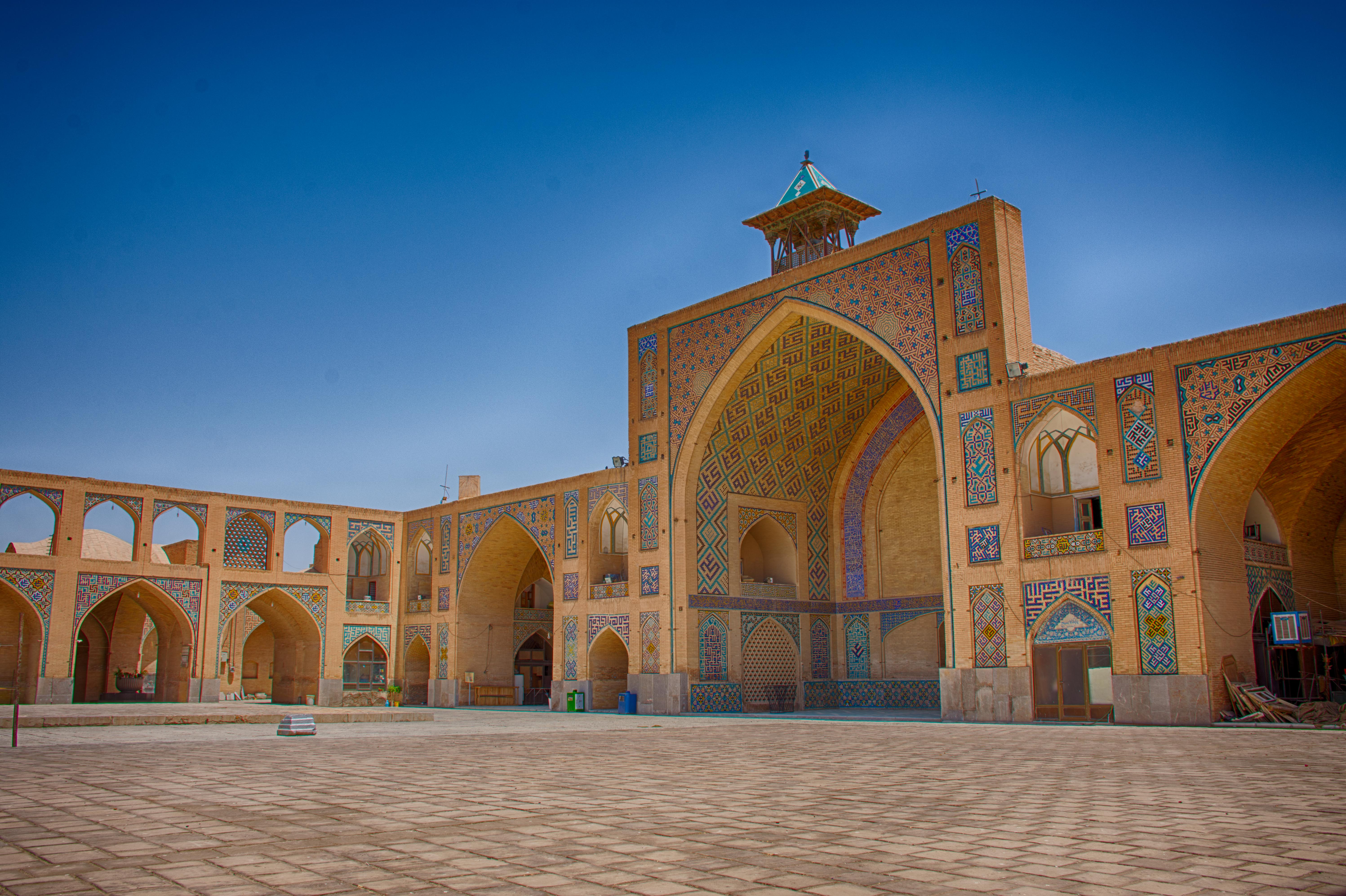
- The mosque sahn in 2017

- Location of the mosque in Iran

Religion
- Affiliation: Shia Islam
- Ecclesiastical or organisational status: Mosque
- Status: Active

Location
- Location: Esfahan, Isfahan Province
- Country: Iran
- Coordinates: 32°39′47″N 51°40′27″E

Architecture
- Architect: Ali Beyk Banay Isfahani
- Type: Mosque architecture
- Style: Safavid
- Funded by: Hakim Daud
- Groundbreaking: 1067 AH (1656/1657 CE)
- Completed: 1073 AH (1662/1663 CE)

Specifications
- Dome: One (maybe more)
- Materials: Bricks; plaster; tiles; adobe

Iran National Heritage List
- Official name: Hakim Mosque
- Type: Mosque
- Designated: 1934
- Reference no.: 223
- Conservation organization: Cultural Heritage, Handicrafts and Tourism Organization of Iran

The Hakim Mosque (Persian: مسجد حکیم, romanized: Masjed-e Hakim) is a Shi'ite mosque, located in Esfahan, in the province of Isfahan, Iran. The mosque is located adjacent to the Isfahan Bazaar. The mosque also serves as a public building, as a madrasa, as a community center for functions, and an emergency shelter for travellers.

Completed in 1073 AH (1662/1663 CE), during the Safavid era, it is one of the oldest mosques in the region, and was built by and named in honour of Hakim Daud, a former Safavid court physician, who had funded the construction from India. The mosque was added to the Iran National Heritage List on 13 December 1934, administered by the Cultural Heritage, Handicrafts and Tourism Organization of Iran.

== Overview ==
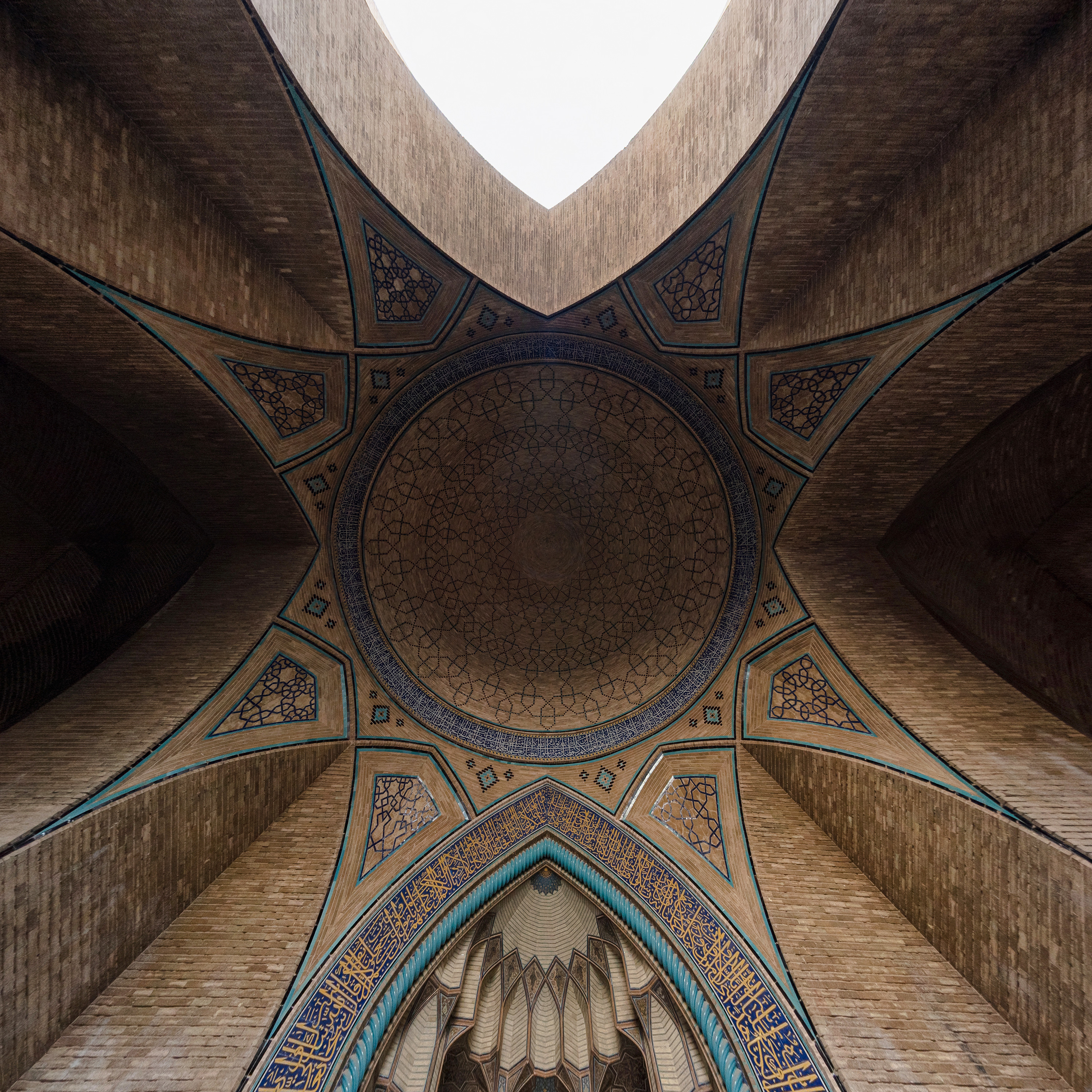
Interior of the main dome

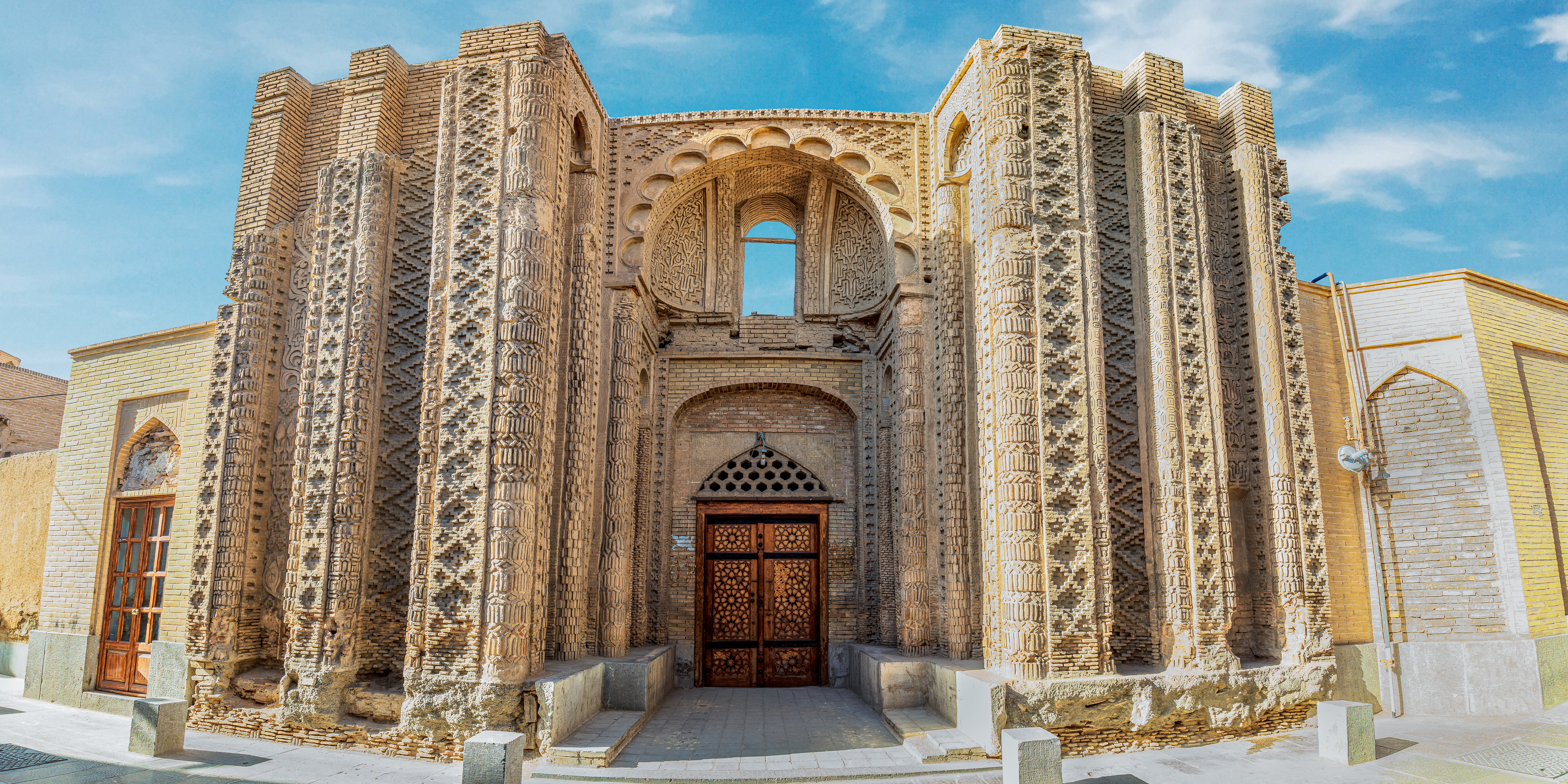
Remnant entrance portal from the earlier Jorjir Mosque

The Hakim Mosque was built over the ruins of a Deylamid mosque, known as Jorjir, that dates from the 10th century CE. Jorjir was commissioned by the Buyid minister, Sahib ibn Abbad, and portions can be seen on the northwestern part of the current mosque structure. The remaining portal of the ruined mosque was hidden for centuries and was accidentally discovered in 1957 when the wall of the Safavid mosque was washed away by rain.

The portal is significant due to its intricate brickwork in the Razi architectural style, where small pieces of bricks are used to create geometrical, floral and vegetal patterns and Kufic inscriptions. These patterns consist of a combination of symbols, like five pairs of candlesticks, tulip, bird and scale patterns. The dated inscription on the northern portal recognizes Ali Beyk Banay Isfahani as the architect, and Mohammad Reza Emami as the calligrapher.

This mosque is constructed in a four-porch plan (Chahar ayvan), and its northern and southern porches are bigger than the western and eastern ones. It holds a dome, a chamber, and two prayer halls. While the exterior view of the dome is simple brickwork, the inside area is decorated with delicate tilework. There is an intricate mihrab in the dome chamber which is ornamented with mosaic tiles and stalactite decoration in turquoise and yellow, symbolizing the tree of life. There are two other altars in two prayer halls around the courtyard.

The Hakim Mosque, located near the bazaar, was commenced in 1067 AH (1656/1657 CE) during the reign of Shah Abbas II. After making his fortune there under the grand Mughals, Hakim Daud financed this mosque in his own name. The mosque has five different small entries and does not have a monumental entry. The mosque sahn is quite large.

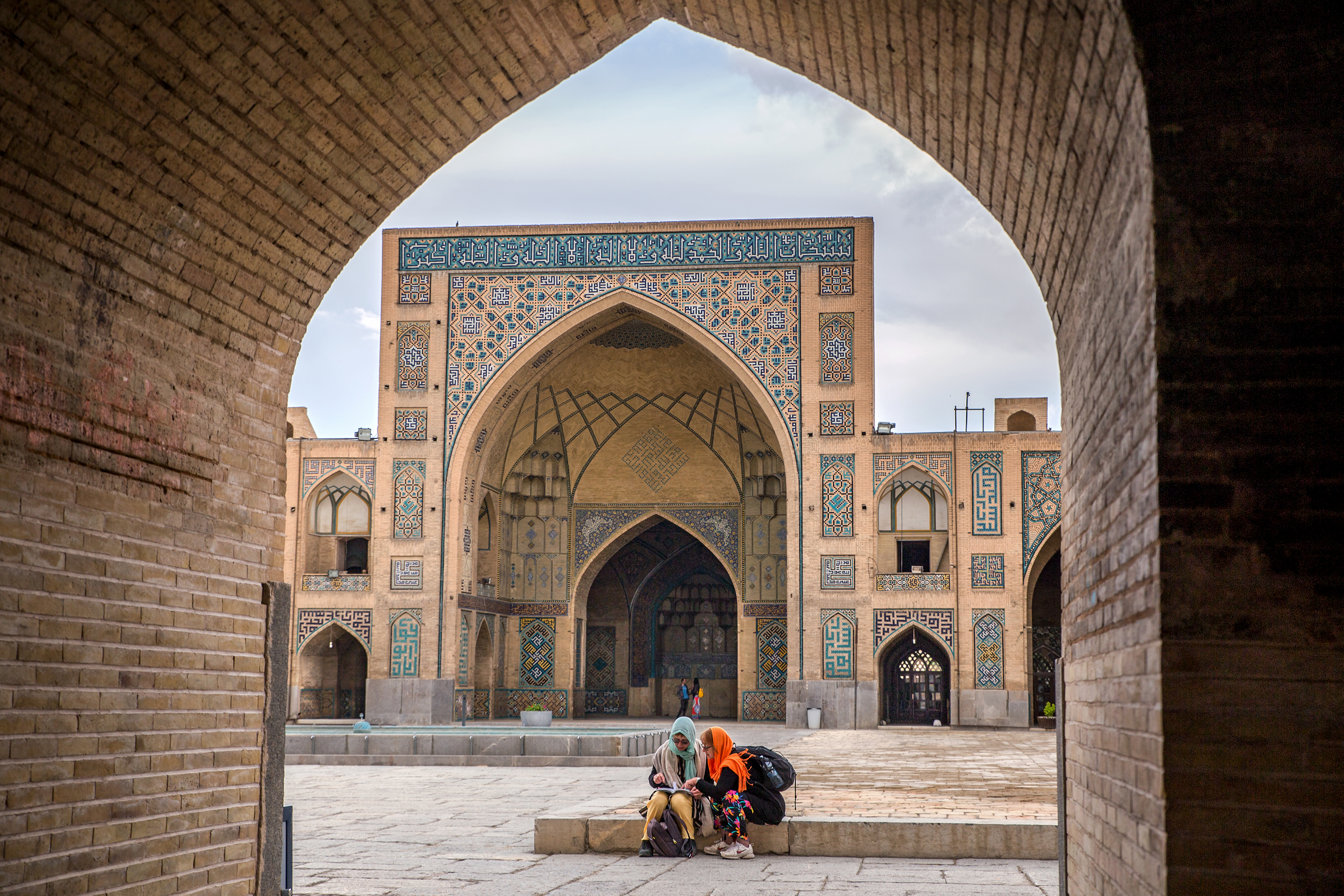
View of the Main Iwan

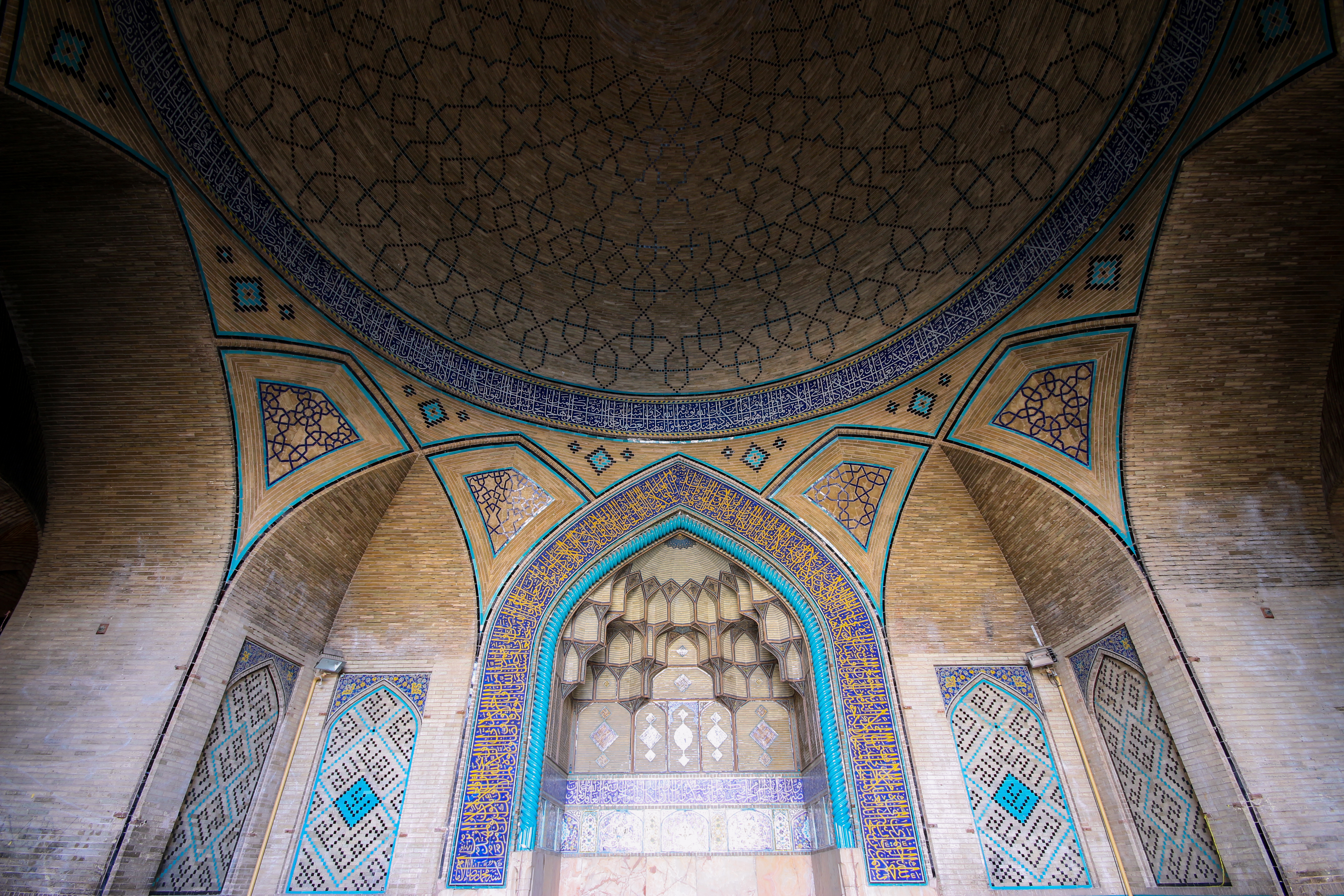
View of the Mihrab chamber

== Gallery ==
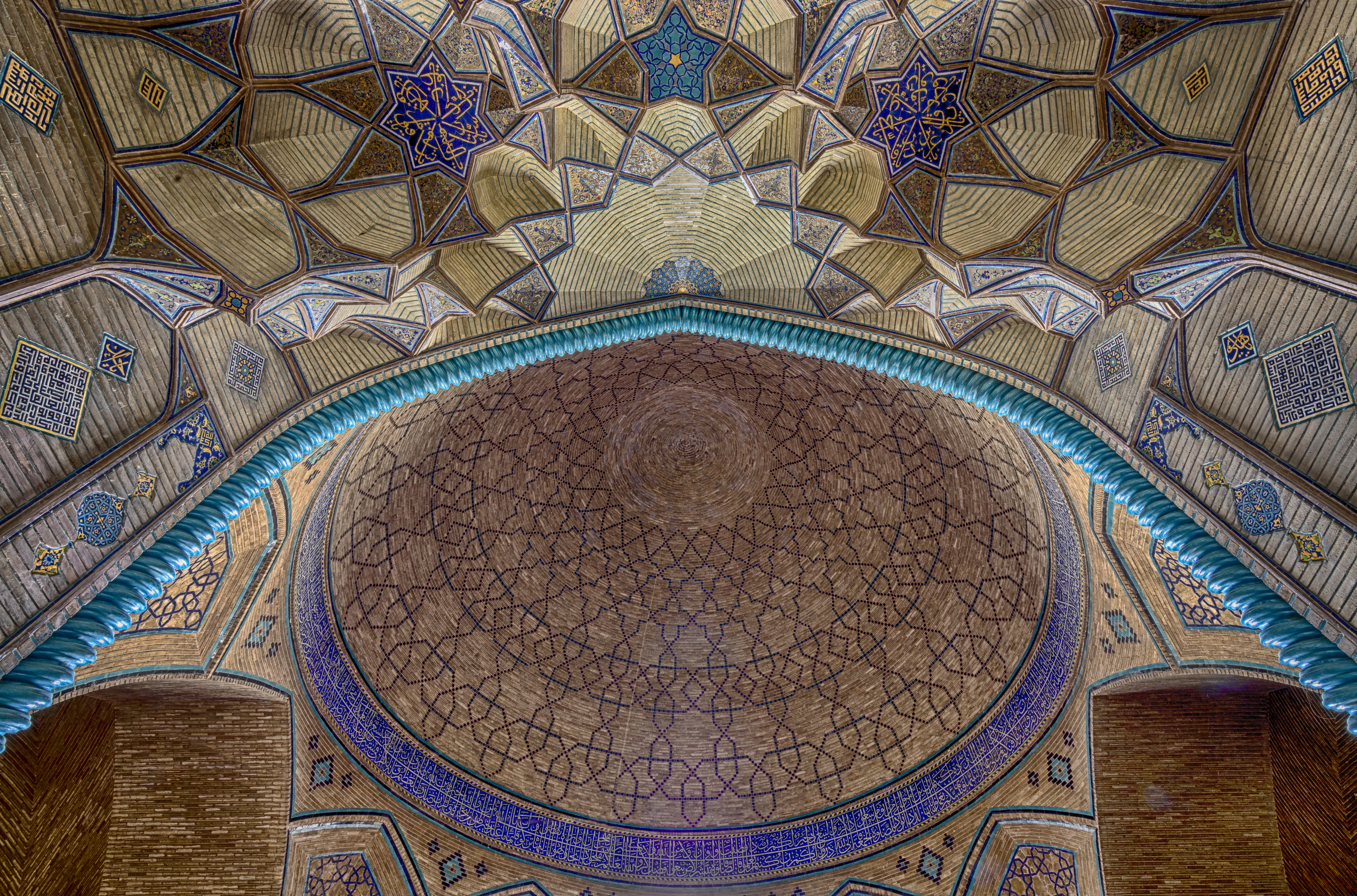
Muqarnas of the Mihrab

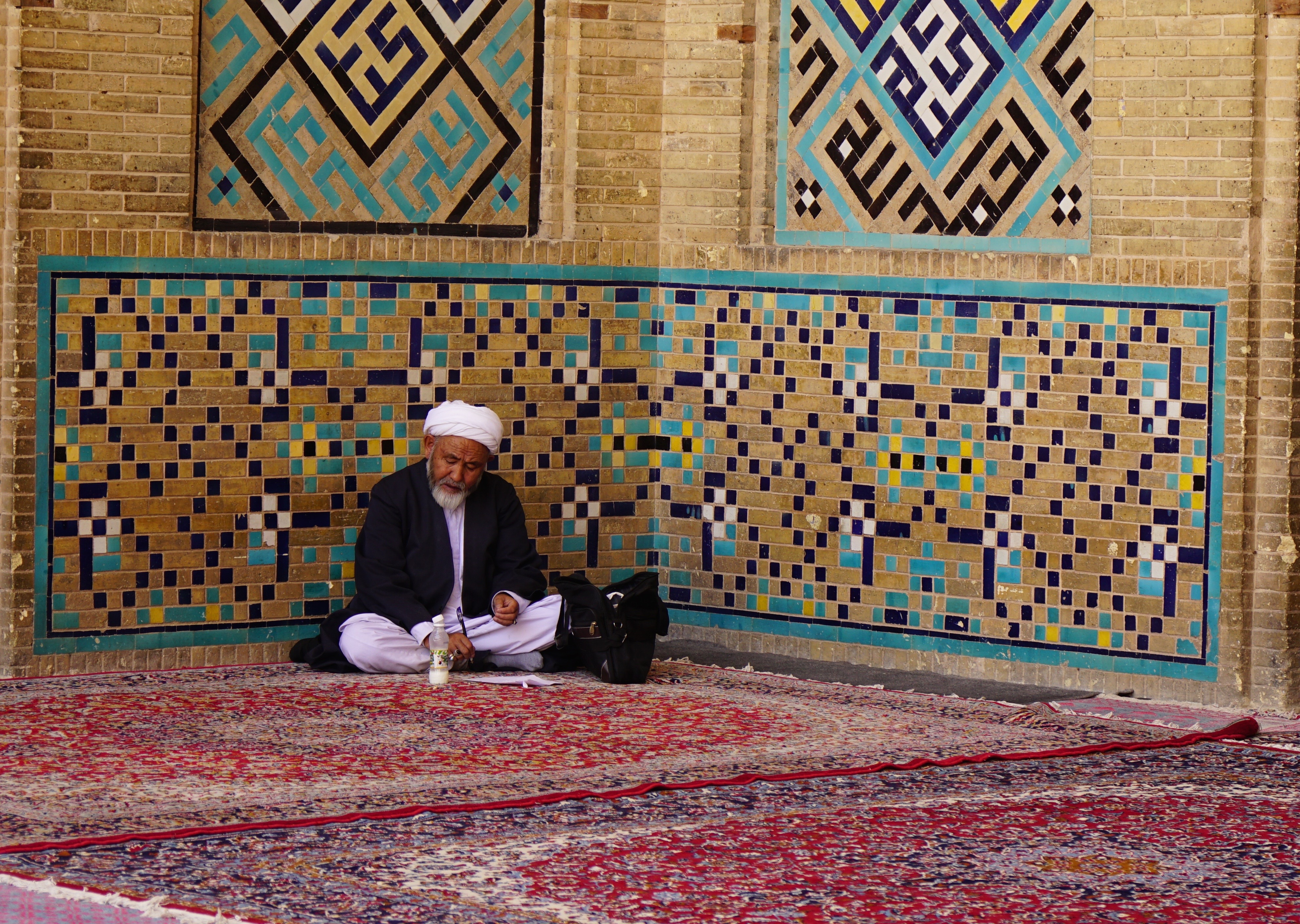
Interior

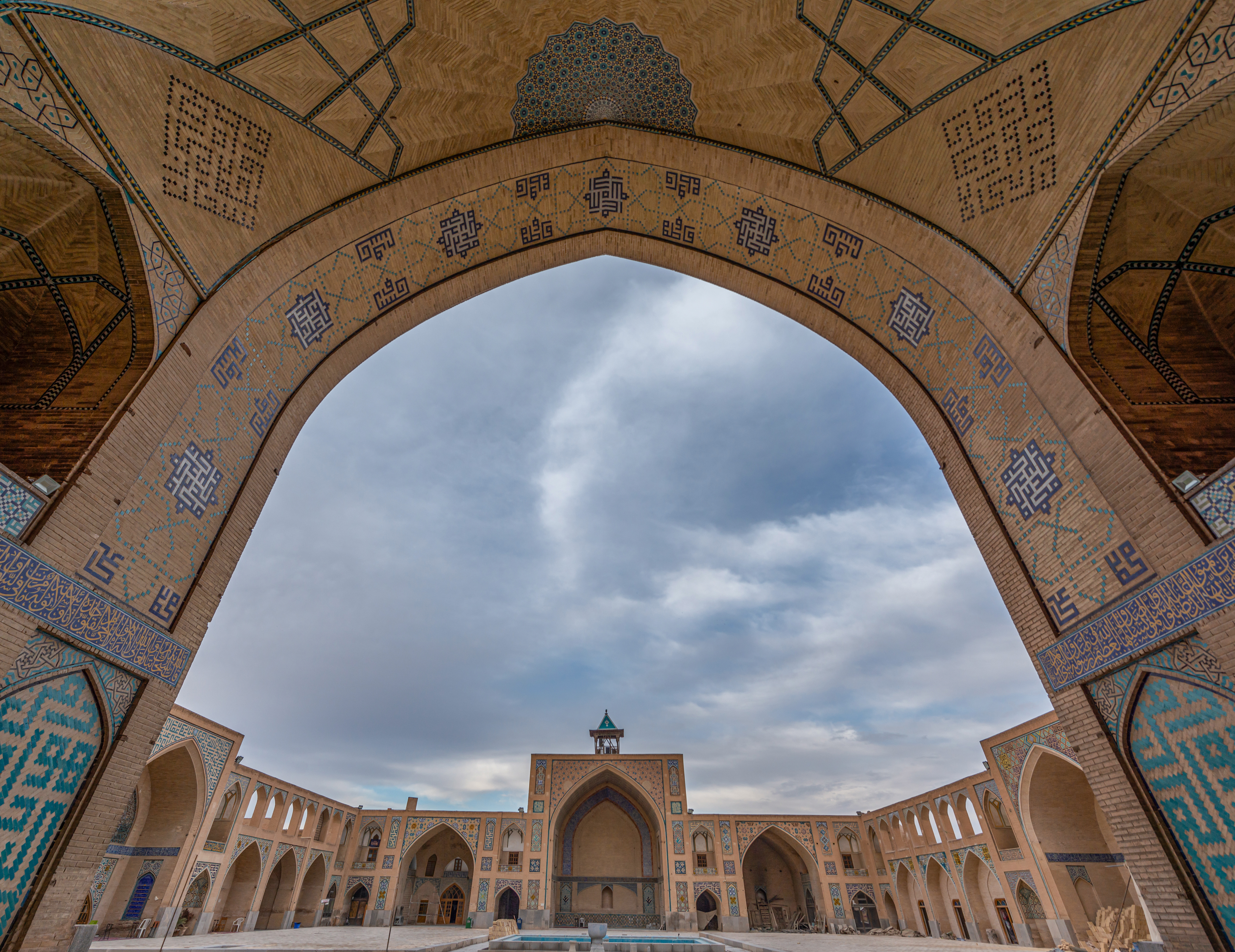
View of the courtyard from the Southern Iwan

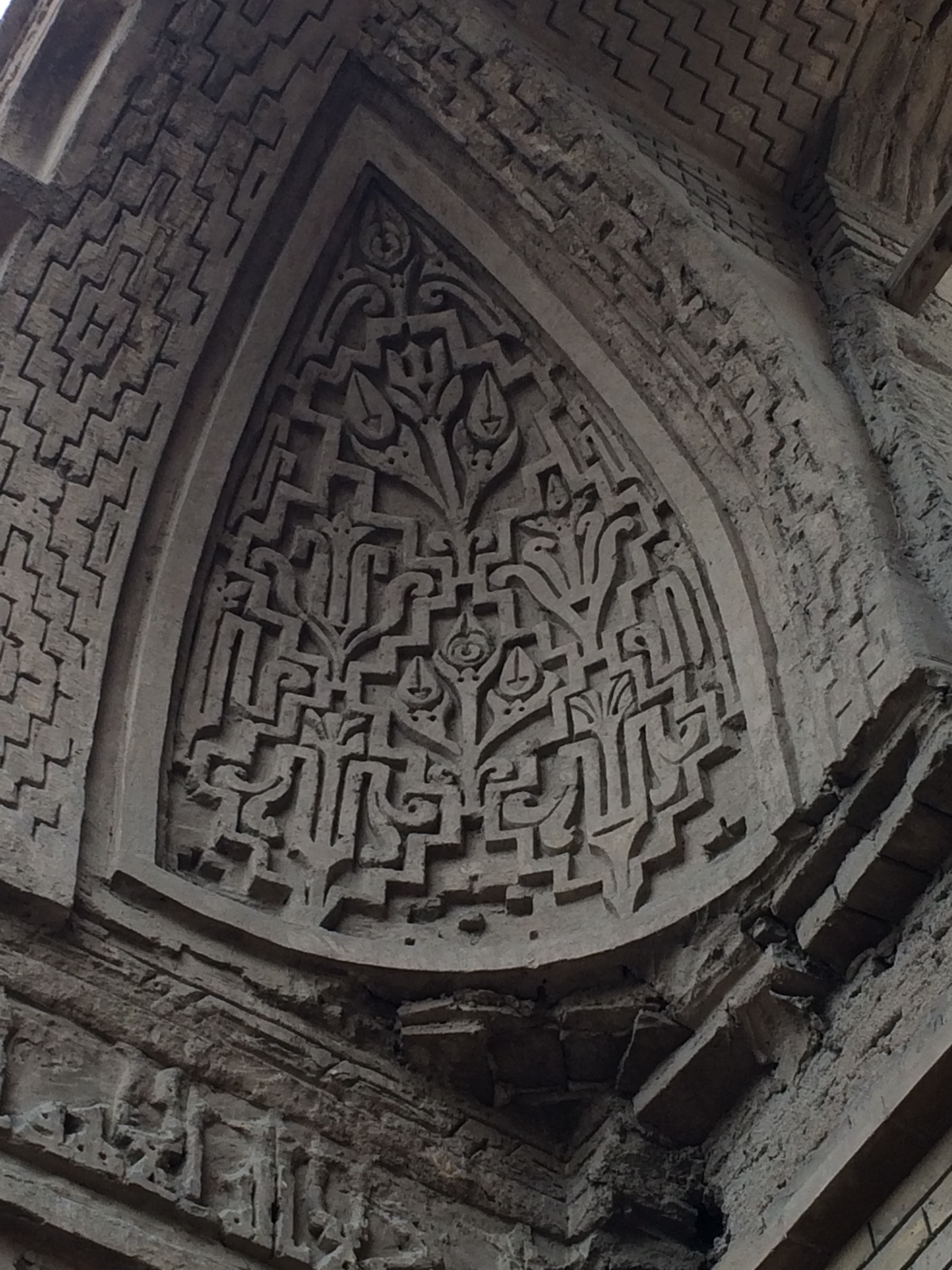
Squinch of Jorjir Iwan

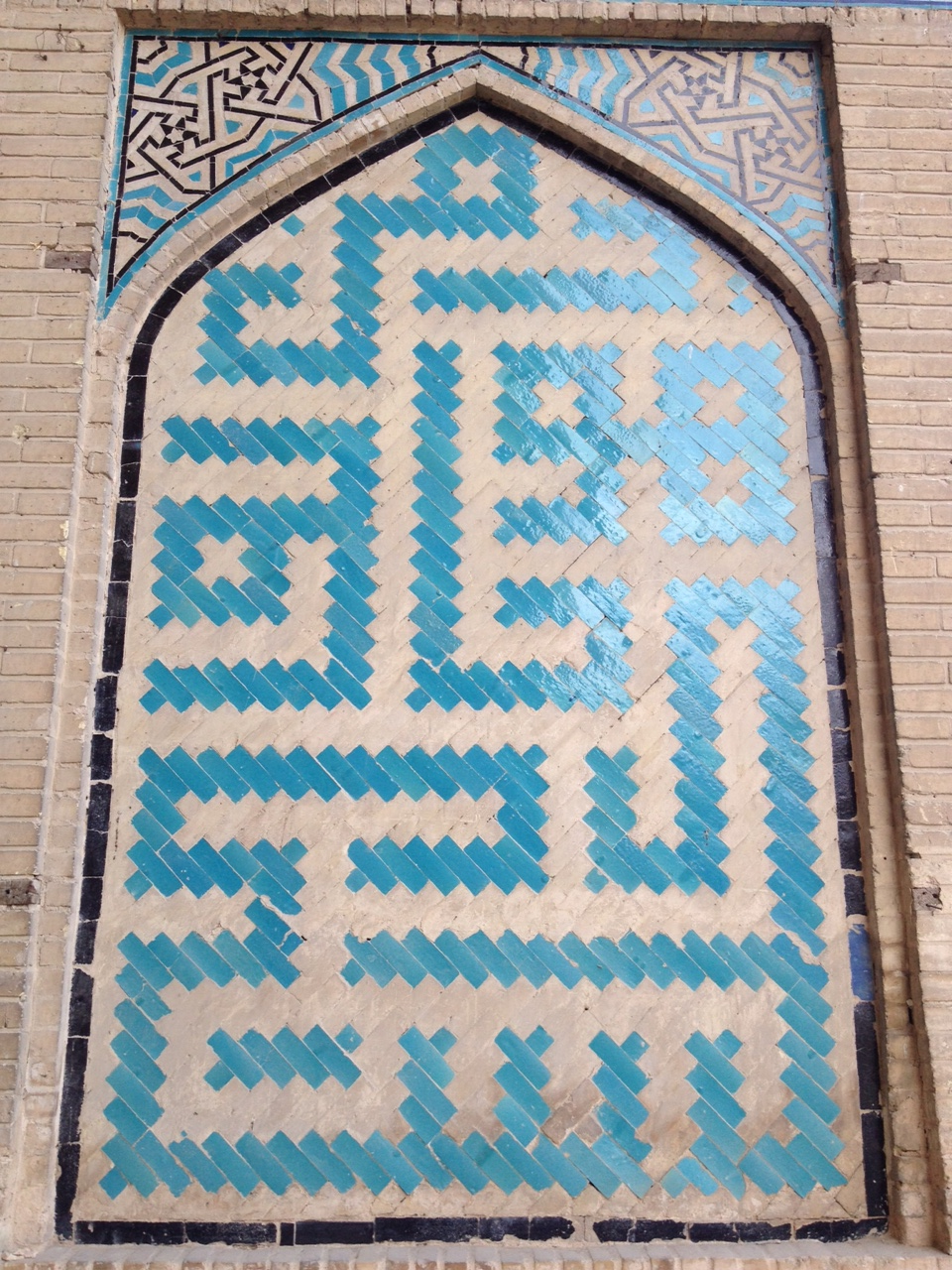
Square Kufic Banna'i

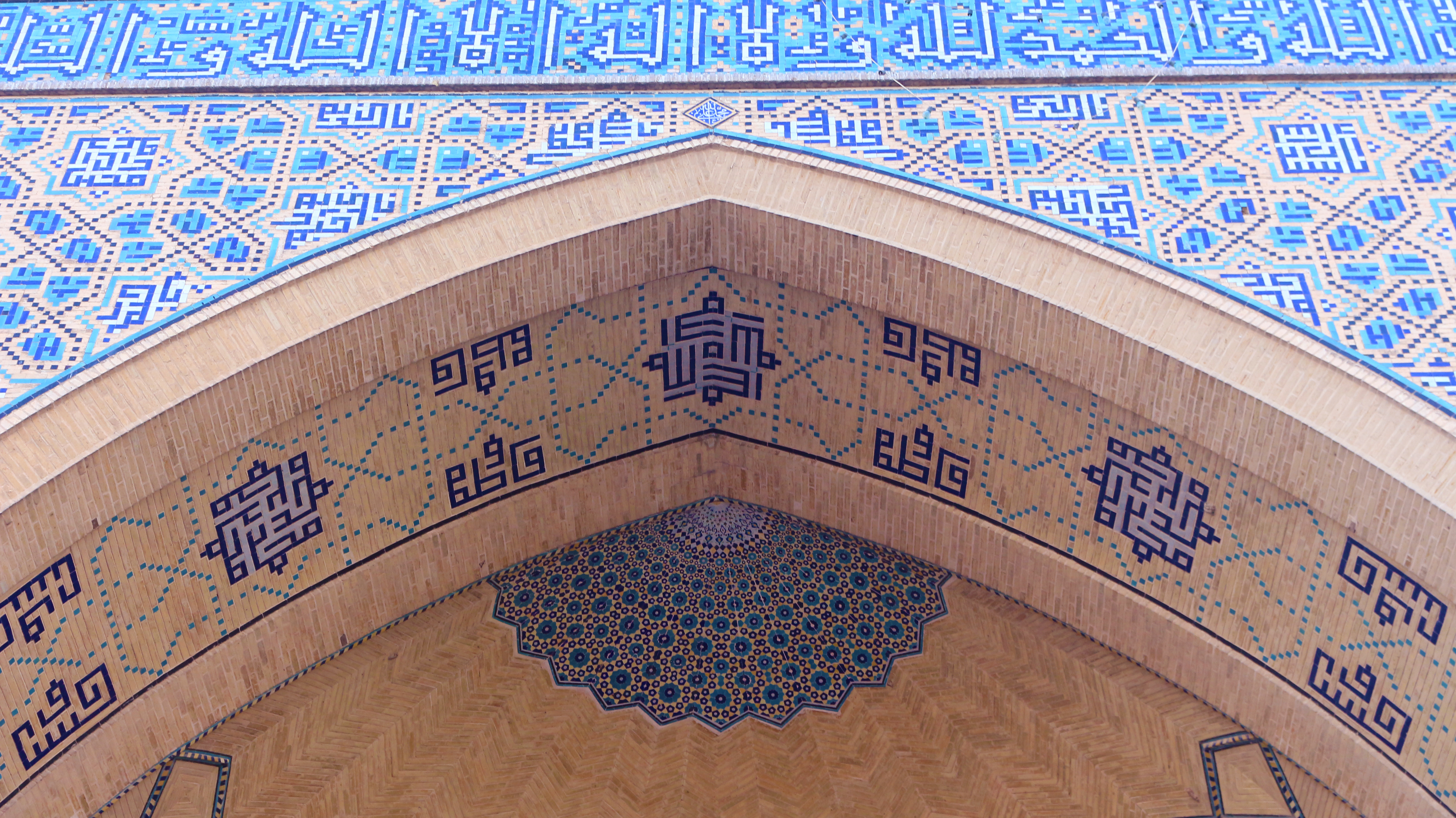
Calligraphy on the Iwan

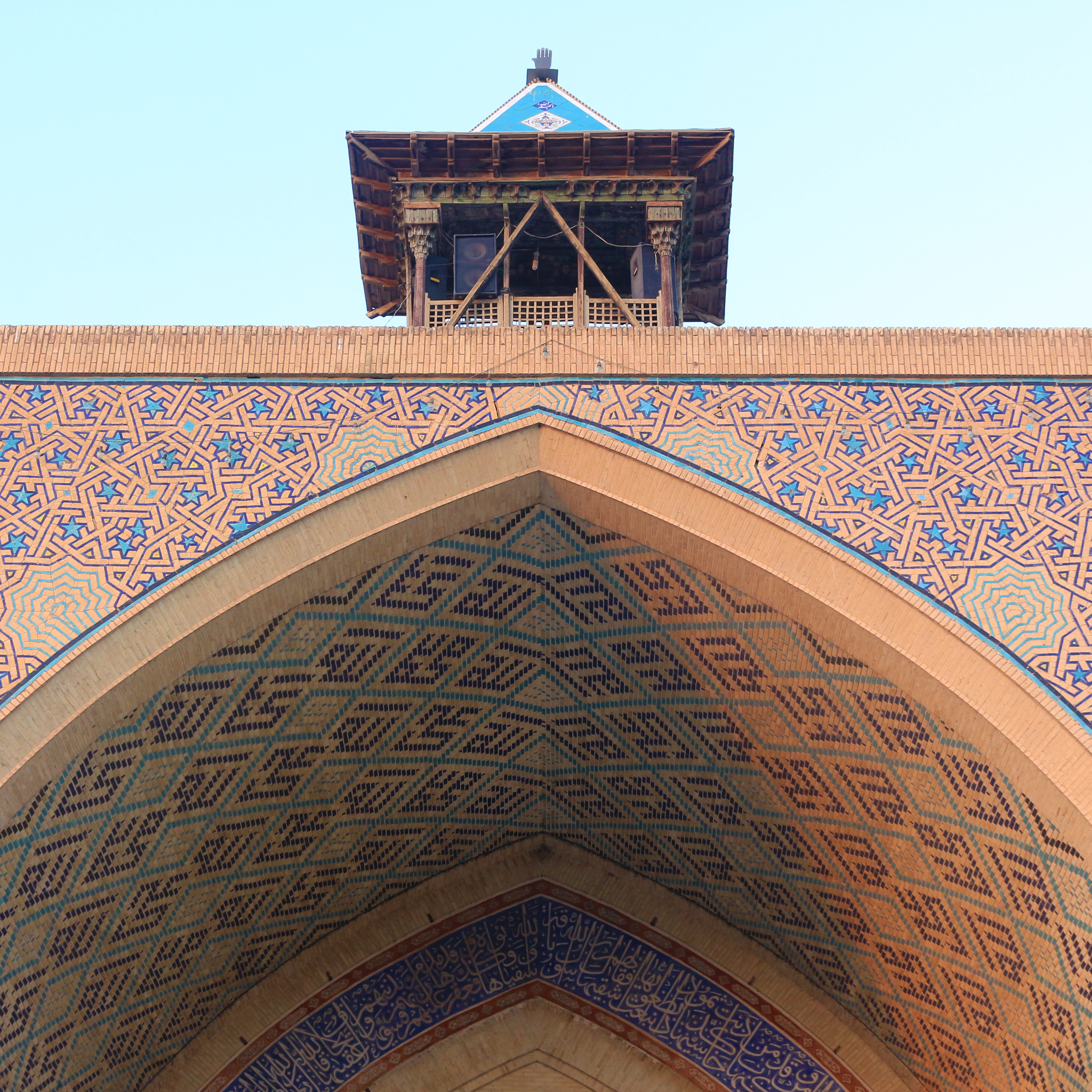
Northern Iwan

== See also ==
- Shia Islam in Iran
- List of mosques in Iran
- List of historical structures in Isfahan
