= Agha Nour Mosque =

Mosque in Isfahan, Iran

- مسجد آقانور
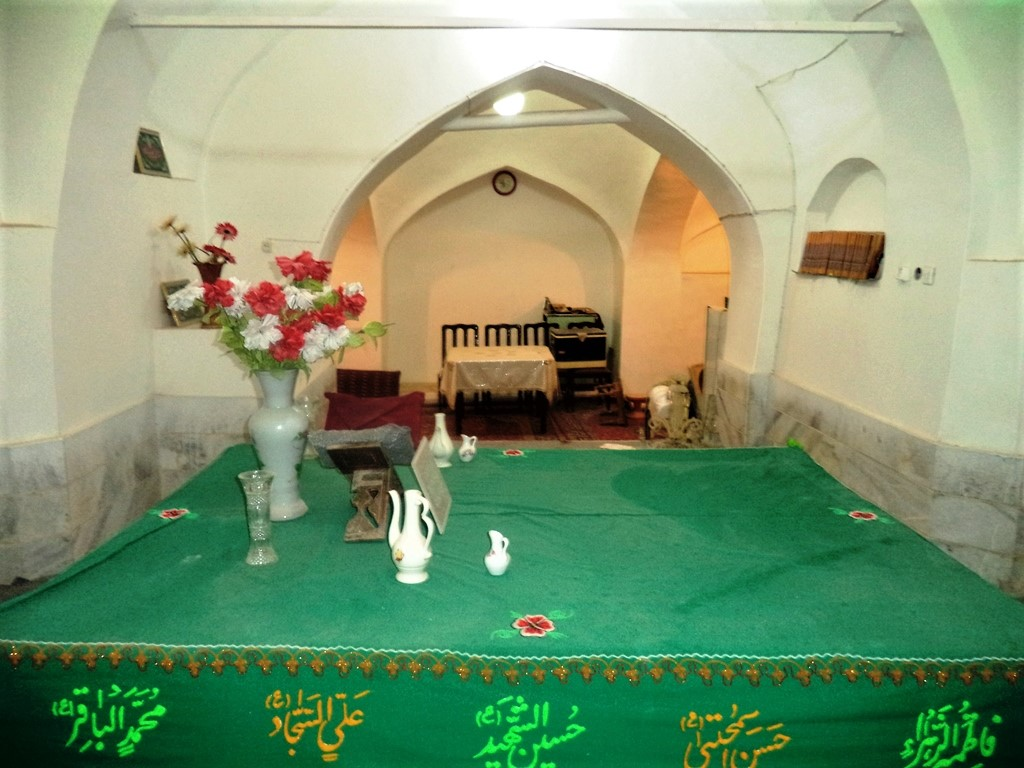
- The mausoleum of Zayn al-Abidin Shahshahani, situated in the mosque

- Location of the mosque in Iran

Religion
- Affiliation: Shia Islam
- Ecclesiastical or organisational status: Mosque
- Status: Active

Location
- Location: Esfahan, Isfahan province
- Country: Iran
- Coordinates: 32°40′25″N 51°40′37″E

Architecture
- Architect: Mohammad Reza Emami
- Type: Mosque architecture
- Style: Isfahani; Qajar; Safavid
- Funded by: Nur al-Din Mohammad
- Groundbreaking: c. 1034 AH (1624/1625 CE)
- Completed: 1039 AH (1629/1630 CE)

Specifications
- Minaret: One
- Inscriptions: Two; one in Thuluth
- Materials: Stone; marble

Website
- aghanoor.com

Iran National Heritage List
- Official name: Agha Nour Mosque
- Type: Built
- Designated: 5 April 1998
- Reference no.: 1971
- Conservation organization: Cultural Heritage, Handicrafts and Tourism Organization of Iran

The Agha Nour Mosque (Persian: مسجد آقانور; Arabic: مسجد أغا نور) (Note: Also variously the Agha Nur Mosque, and the Agha Noor Mosque.) is a Shi'ite mosque located in the Dardasht neighbourhood of Esfahan, in the province of Isfahan, Iran. The mosque was completed in 1039 AH (1629/1630 CE).

The mosque was added to the Iran National Heritage List on 5 April 1998, administered by the Cultural Heritage, Handicrafts and Tourism Organization of Iran.

== Overview ==
The mosque was established during the reign of Shah Abbas I and was completed a year after his death, during the reign of Shah Safi, in 1039 AH (1629/1630 CE). Both shahs were mentioned in the inscription above the portal of the mosque. The mosque was built under the supervision of Nour ed-Din Mohammad Esfahani, one of the richest men in Isfahan. The Shabestan was added to the mosque during the Qajar era, and is one of the most beautiful Shabestans in Isfahan, with stone pillars with marble arches, that provide light during the day.

The mosque contains the mausoleum of Zayn al-Abidin Shahshahani (1828–1900); an Iranian Qajar-era Twelver Shia cleric and author.

== Architecture ==
The mosque has been completed in the four iwan (Chahar Iwani) style and includes a portal, sahn, four Iwans, Shabestan, tile decorations, and some historical inscriptions. The eastern iwan is inscribed in verse dating from 1034 AH (1624/1625 CE). Another inscription located on the portal of the eastern iwan is written in Suls calligraphy on azure adobe tile and it describes that the mosque was started by Nour Ed-Din Mohammad Isfahani (Aqa Noor), one of the richest and righteous men in Isfahan, in the reign of Shah Abbas, and was completed in the first year of Shah Safi's era. This inscription was written by Mohammad Reza Emami.

The pillared Shabestan of the mosque includes stony columns and marble arches that provide light during the day. This Shabestan also has a small Mihrab. The outer portal of Shabestan, next to the northern portal, is adorned with special decorations. This Shabestan was added in the 13th century AH, constructed at the expense of Haj Mohammad Ebrahim Ghazvini, a former Imam of the mosque. The Shabestan has one of the most beautiful belvederes among Isfahan's mosques counterparts.

During the Iran–Iraq War, the mosque was exposed to Iraqi airstrikes, which resulted in destruction of the southern clerestory, arches, tile decorations, mirror, and the minaret, which were later restored and renovated.

== See also ==
- Shia Islam in Iran
- List of mosques in Iran
- List of historical structures in Isfahan
