= Mohammad Saleh Esfahani =

Persian calligrapher (d. 1714)

Mohammad Saleh Esfahani (Persian: محمدصالح اصفهانی) was a Persian calligrapher in the Safavid era. He was the son and student of Aboutorab Esfahani. He was a follower of Mir Emad's style. Many of the inscriptions on the historical buildings in Esfahan like the inscription on the iwan of Chehel Sotoun palace are his works. He died on 3 April 1714.
