= Mirza Mohammad-Ali Sanglakh =

Iranian calligrapher (d.1877)

Mirza Mohammad-Ali Khorasani Sanglakh (Persian: میرزا محمد علی خراسانی سنگلاخ; died 3 March 1877), also known as Mirza Sanglakh, was an Iranian calligrapher and stone carver of the 19th century. He was also a poet and author.

Sanglakh flourished during the reign of three successive Iranian monarchs; Fath-Ali Shah Qajar, Mohammad Shah Qajar and Naser al-Din Shah Qajar. He was born in Quchan and died in Tabriz. He is the author of Tadhkirat al-khatṭạ̣̄tị̄n al-musammā bi-kitāb Imtihạ̄n al-fudạlā containing the biographies of numerous calligraphers.

== Sources ==
- Ekhtiar, Maryam (2008). "SANGLĀḴ, MOḤAMMAD-ʿALI". Encyclopedia Iranica.
