= Government of Asadollah Alam (1962–63) =

Imperial Iran's government between July 1962 and February 1963

- Cabinet of Pahlavi Iran

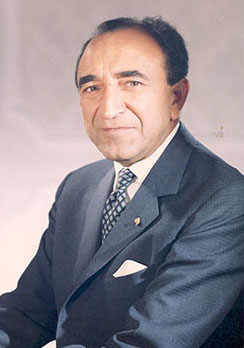
- Prime Minister Asadollah Alam
- Date formed: 21 July 1962
- Date dissolved: 18 February 1963

People and organisations
- Head of state: Mohammad Reza Pahlavi
- Head of government: Asadollah Alam
- Total no. of members: 16

History
- Predecessor: Government of Ali Amini
- Successor: Second Government of Asadollah Alam

The government formed by Prime Minister Asadollah Alam was inaugurated on 21 July 1962. It succeeded the Government of Ali Amini when Amini resigned from office on 18 July 1962.

During the rule of Alam Iran witnessed the acceleration of demonstrations by the religious establishment which made Ruhollah Khomeini a leader of opposition and the increase of land distribution by the state. The tenure of the Alam cabinet ended on 18 February 1963 when Prime Minister Alalm submitted his resignation to the Shah Mohammad Reza Pahlavi. Next cabinet was formed by Asadollah Alam in the same month.

== List of ministers ==
Eight cabinet members were from the previous cabinet led by Ali Amini.

The cabinet was consisted of the following sixteen members:

Portfolio	Minister	Took office	Left office	Party
Prime Minister	Asadollah Alam	21 July 1962	19 February 1963	
Deputy Prime Minister	Safi Asfia	21 July 1962	19 February 1963	
Minister of War	Ali-Asghar Naghdi	21 July 1962	19 February 1963	Military
Minister of Foreign Affairs	Abbas Aram	21 July 1962	19 February 1963	
Minister of Agriculture	Hasan Arsanjani	21 July 1962	19 February 1963	
Minister of Interior	Sadegh Amirazizi	21 July 1962	19 February 1963	Military
Minister of Labor	Ataollah Khosravani	21 July 1962	19 February 1963	
Minister of Posts, Telegraph and Telephone	Hushang Samii	21 July 1962	19 February 1963	
Minister of Finance	Abdolhossein Behnia	21 July 1962	19 February 1963	Independent
Minister of Roads	Davud Rajabi	21 July 1962	19 February 1963	
Minister of Justice	Gholam Hossein Khoshbin	21 July 1962	19 February 1963	
Minister of Health	Ismail Riahi	21 July 1962	19 February 1963	Military
Minister of Education	Parviz Natel-Khanlari	21 July 1962	19 February 1963	Independent
Minister of Commerce	Gholam Hossein Jahanshahi	21 July 1962	19 February 1963	
Minister of State	Nasrollah Entezam	21 July 1962	19 February 1963	
Minister of State	Masoud Faroghi	21 July 1962	19 February 1963	
