= Government of Ali Amini =

Cabinet of Imperial State of Iran headed by Ali Amini

- cabinet of Iran

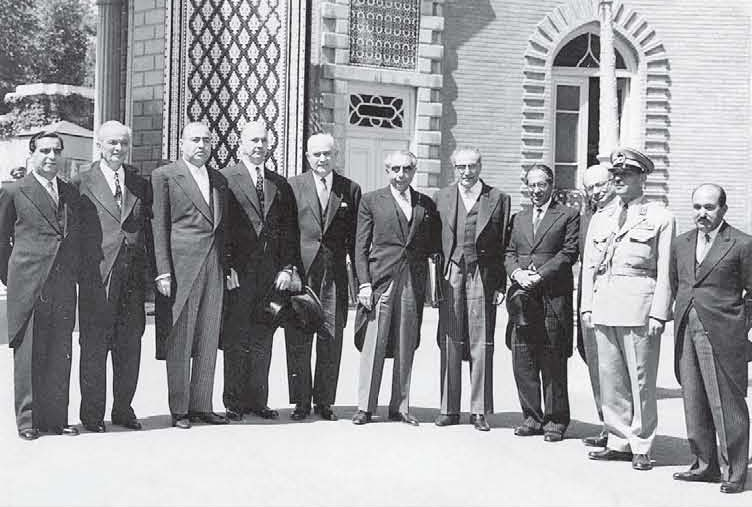
- Date formed: 5 May 1961
- Date dissolved: 19 July 1962

People and organisations
- Head of state: Mohammad Reza Shah
- Head of government: Ali Amini
- Total no. of members: 19
- Status in legislature: Parliament Dissolved

History
- Predecessor: Sharif-Emami
- Successor: Alam

Ali Amini was appointed to rule by decree as the Prime Minister of Iran on 5 May 1961, succeeding Jafar Sharif-Emami. His cabinet was approved on 9 May 1961.

Shah Mohammad Reza Pahlavi was not enthusiastic about appointing Ali Amini as prime minister. In addition, the Kennedy administration established a task force, the Iran Task Force, to support the cabinet of Amini which was regarded by the Shah as a move to reduce his power and authority.

== Composition ==
Though Amini was considered a "maverick aristocrat" and "too independent of the personal control of the monarch", appointment of ministers of foreign affairs, war, the interior was made at the behest of the Shah. All of the three portfolios, plus agriculture ministry were left unchanged in the next administration under Asadollah Alam.

Most controversially, Amini gave three ministries to "middle-class reformers who had in the past criticized the political influence of the shah as well as the corrupt practices of the landed families". The three portfolios were justice, agriculture and education ministries. Noureddin Alamouti, an ex-member of the Tudeh Party who later entered the inner circle of Ahmad Qavam was appointed as the justice minister while agriculture ministry went to Hassan Arsanjani who was a radical and another protege of Qavam. Muhammad Derekhshesh who was as a leader of teacher's trade union drew support from both the Tudeh and the National Front, became the education minister. Moreover, he included Gholam-Ali Farivar as the industry minister in his cabinet, who was a former leader of the Iran Party (a party affiliated with the National Front).

== Cabinet ==
Members of Amini's cabinet were as follows:

Portfolio	Minister	Took office	Left office	Party	Ref
Prime Minister	Ali Amini	5 May 1961	19 July 1962	Nonpartisan	
Foreign Minister	Hossein Ghods-Nakhai	9 May 1961	1 April 1962	Nonpartisan	
Foreign Minister	Abbas Aram	1 April 1962	19 July 1962	Nonpartisan	
Interior Minister	Sadegh Amirazizi	9 May 1961	19 July 1962	Military	
Agriculture Minister	Hasan Arsanjani	9 May 1961	19 July 1962	Nonpartisan	
Culture Minister	Mohammad Derakhshesh	9 May 1961	19 July 1962	Nonpartisan	
Commerce Minister	Ali-Asghar Pourhomayoun (head of ministry)	9 May 1961	1 July 1961	People's Party	
Commerce Minister	Jahangir Amouzegar	1 July 1961	28 May 1962	Nonpartisan	
Finance Minister	Abdolhossein Behnia	9 May 1961	17 February 1962	Nonpartisan	
Finance Minister	Mohammad-Ali Hanjani (head of ministry)	17 February 1962	28 May 1962	Nonpartisan	
Finance Minister	Jahangir Amouzegar	28 May 1962	19 July 1962	Nonpartisan	
Justice Minister	Noureddin Alamouti	9 May 1961	19 July 1962	People's Party	
Labor Minister	Ataollah Khosravani	9 May 1961	19 July 1962	Nonpartisan	
Post & Telegraph Minister	Houshang Samii	9 May 1961	19 July 1962	Nationalists	
Public Health Minister	Ismail Riahi	3 June 1961	19 July 1962	Military	
Roads Minister	Jamal Ganji	9 May 1961	19 July 1962	People's Party	
Mine & Industry Minister	Gholam-Ali Farivar	9 May 1961	31 December 1961	Nonpartisan	
Mine & Industry Minister	Taqi Sarlak	31 December 1961	19 July 1962	Nonpartisan	
War Minister	Ali-Asghar Naghdi	9 May 1961	19 July 1962	Military	
Minister without portfolio	Hadi Ashtari	9 May 1961	19 July 1962	Nonpartisan	
Minister without portfolio	Ali-Asghar Pourhomayoun	9 May 1961	19 July 1962	People's Party	
Minister without portfolio	Mohsen Sadr	28 May 1962	19 July 1962	Nonpartisan	
