= List of ambassadors of Iran to Afghanistan =

List of Iranian ambassadors

Coordinates: 34.530833°N 69.175162°E

Ambassador of Iran to Afghanistan
- Persian: سفیر ایران در افغانستان
- Coat of Arms of Iran
- Incumbent; Alireza Bigdeli since 24 November 2024
- Inaugural holder: Nasrollah Ehtela ol-Molk Khalatbari
- Formation: 1919

The Iranian ambassador in Kabul is the official representative of the Government in Tehran to the Government of Afghanistan.

== List of representatives ==
Diplomatic accreditation	Diplomatic accreditation Solar Hijri calendar	Ambassador	Persian language	Observations	List of heads of state of Iran	List of heads of state of Afghanistan	Term end	Term end Solar Hijri calendar
1919	1298	Nasrollah Ehtela ol-Molk Khalatbari (fa)	Persian: نصرالله خلعتبری اعتلاءالملک		Ahmad Shah Qajar	Amanullah Khan		
1926	1305	Mehdi Farrokh (de)	Persian: مهدی فرخ		Reza Shah Pahlavi	Amanullah Khan		
1927	1306	Abdolmohmed Moadab os-Sultan	Persian: عبدالمحمد مؤدب‌السلطان		Reza Shah Pahlavi	Amanullah Khan		
1928	1307	Nasrollah Ehtela ol-Molk Khalatbari	Persian: نصرالله خلعتبری		Reza Shah Pahlavi	Amanullah Khan		
1932	1311	Mohammad-Taghi Esfandiari (fa)	Persian: محمدتقی اسفندیاری منتخب‌الملک		Reza Shah Pahlavi	Mohammed Nadir Shah	1935	1314
1933	1312	Mahmoud Salahi	Persian: محمود صلاحی		Reza Shah Pahlavi	Mohammed Zahir Shah	1934	1313
1934	1313	Ali Akbar Bahman	Persian: علی‌اکبر بهمن		Reza Shah Pahlavi	Mohammed Zahir Shah		
1938	1317	Bagher Kazemi	Persian: باقر کاظمی		Reza Shah Pahlavi	Mohammed Zahir Shah		
1939	1318	Ali Soheili	Persian: علی سهیلی		Reza Shah Pahlavi	Mohammed Zahir Shah		
1940	1319	Hossein Sami'i	Persian: حسین سمیعی ادیب‌السلطنه		Reza Shah Pahlavi	Mohammed Zahir Shah		
1943	1322	Abolqasem Najm	Persian: ابوالقاسم نجم		Mohammad Reza Shah Pahlavi	Mohammed Zahir Shah		
1946	1324	Hassan-Ali Kamal Hedayat Nasr ol-Molk (fa)	Persian: حسنعلی کمال هدایت نصرالملک		Mohammad Reza Shah Pahlavi	Mohammed Zahir Shah	1948	1327
1949	1328	Abdol-Hossein Masoud Ansari (fa)	Persian: عبدالحسین مسعود انصاری		Mohammad Reza Shah Pahlavi	Mohammed Zahir Shah		
1951	1330	Mahmoud Salahi	Persian: محمود صلاحی	SALAHI, Mahmud : B. 1892; P. Retired Diplomat; F. Belong to an old pious family of Tehran, who SALAHSHUR held high … Held the Following positions:- Consul - General of Iran at Harat; Consul at Mosul; consul at Baghdad; from 1930 to 1932 Consul in Hamburg.; 1 February 1939, the Exequatur, as Consul - General at Hamburg.; Director General of the Ministry of Foreign Affairs.; Acting Foreign Minister.; Iranian ambassador to Iraq Baghdad. Iranian ambassador to Saudi Arabia, Jeddah.	Mohammad Reza Shah Pahlavi	Mohammed Zahir Shah	1951	1330
1952	1331	Mahmud Salahi	Persian: محمود صلاحی		Mohammad Reza Shah Pahlavi	Mohammed Zahir Shah		
1955	1334	Mohammad Shayesteh	Persian: محمد شایسته		Mohammad Reza Shah Pahlavi	Mohammed Zahir Shah		
1959	1338	Abdol-Amir Rashidi Haeri (fa)	Persian: عبدالامیر رشیدی حائری		Mohammad Reza Shah Pahlavi	Mohammed Zahir Shah		
1961	1340	Mohammad Zolfaqari (fa)	Persian: محمد ذوالفقاری		Mohammad Reza Shah Pahlavi	Mohammed Zahir Shah		
1966	1345	Mahmoud Foroughi (fa)	Persian: محمود فروغی		Mohammad Reza Shah Pahlavi	Mohammed Zahir Shah		
13 August 1971	1350	Jahangir Tafazzoli			Mohammad Reza Shah Pahlavi	Mohammed Zahir Shah	1974	1353
13 August 1974	1353	Hossein Davoudi	Persian: حسین حسینی داوودی		Mohammad Reza Shah Pahlavi	Mohammed Daoud Khan	1978	1357
13 August 1978	1357	Pourang Baharlu	Persian: پورنگ بهارلو	Chargé d'affaires (died in 1979) Pourang Baharlu, the Portuguese Republic – l'Ambassadeur d'Iran à Berne, Sion, 24 septembre 1971: Réception de l'Ambassadeur d'Iran à Berne, Sion, 24 septembre ... accompagné du conseiller d'ambassade Monsieur Pourang Baharlou.	Mohammad Reza Shah Pahlavi	Nur Muhammad Taraki	1978	1357
December 1978	1357	Vahid Majdi	Persian: وحید مجدی	Chargé d'affaires (died in 1979) in English 1230 gmt 5 Oct 79) Amin receives foreign envoys On 6 October President Amin received the outgoing Pakistan Ambassador, Riaz Piracha, and the Iranian charge d'affaires, Vahid Majdi (Kabul home service 1600 gmt 6 Oct 79)	Mohammad Reza Shah Pahlavi	Nur Muhammad Taraki	1979	
1982	1361	Alireza Nikunia		Chargé d'affaires	Ali Khamenei	Babrak Karmal	1984	
1985	1364	Mohammad-Taghi Mohammadi	Persian: محمدتقی حاج‌محمدی	Chargé d'affaires	Ali Khamenei	Babrak Karmal	1985	
1 July 1992	1371	Mohammad Hassan Mohieddin Najafi	Persian: محمدحسین محی‌الدین نجفی		Akbar Hashemi Rafsanjani	Burhanuddin Rabbani	1 September 1992	1371
13 May 1995	1374	Mohammad-Reza Forghani	Persian: محمدرضا فرقانی	2009 he was Iranian ambassador to Turkmenistan in Ashgabat.	Akbar Hashemi Rafsanjani	Burhanuddin Rabbani		
1998	1377	Mohammad-Ebrahim Taherian Fard	Persian: محمدابراهیم طاهریان‌فرد	16.10.2018 he was Iranian ambassador to Turkey	Mohammad Khatami	Burhanuddin Rabbani		
2003	1382	Mohammad-Reza Bahrami	Persian: محمدرضا بهرامی طاقانکی		Mohammad Khatami	Hamid Karzai	20 September 2007	1386
2007	1386	Mohammad-Hassan Mohieddin Najafi		Chargé d'affaires Najafi, Mohammad Hasan Mohi-ed-Din	Mahmoud Ahmadinejad	Hamid Karzai		
2010	1389	Fada-Hossein Maleki(fa)	Persian: فداحسین مالکی		Mahmoud Ahmadinejad	Hamid Karzai	2012	1391
8 May 2012	1391	Abolfazl Zohrevand	Persian: ابوالفضل ظهره‌وند		Mahmoud Ahmadinejad	Hamid Karzai	2013	1392
1 November 2013	1392	Mohammad-Reza Bahrami	Persian: محمدرضا بهرامی طاقانکی		Hassan Rouhani	Hamid Karzai	2019	1398
15 December 2019	1398	Bahador Aminian	Persian: بهادر امینیان		Hassan Rouhani	Ashraf Ghani	2022	1401
18 December 2022	1401	Hassan Kazemi Qomi	Persian: حسن کاظمی قمی		Ebrahim Raisi	Hibatullah Akhundzada		

== See also ==
- Afghanistan–Iran relations
