= Government of Asadollah Alam (1963–64) =

Imperial Iran's government between February 1963 and March 1964

- Cabinet of Pahlavi Iran

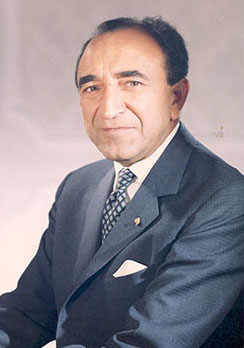
- Prime Minister Asadollah Alam
- Date formed: 19 February 1963
- Date dissolved: 7 March 1964

People and organisations
- Head of state: Mohammad Reza Pahlavi
- Head of government: Asadollah Alam
- Total no. of members: 16
- Member party: People's Party

History
- Predecessor: First Government of Asadollah Alam
- Successor: Government of Hassan Ali Mansur

The second government formed by Prime Minister Asadollah Alam was inaugurated on 19 February 1963. It replaced the first government of Alam which ended on 18 February when he submitted his resignation to the Shah Mohammad Reza Pahlavi. The cabinet lasted for nearly thirteen months until 7 March 1964 when Asadollah Alam resigned from the office. It was succeeded by the cabinet of Hassan Ali Mansur.

== List of ministers ==
The cabinet was consisted of the following sixteen members:

Cabinet
| Portfolio | Minister | Took office | Left office | Party |
|---|---|---|---|---|
| Prime Minister | Asadollah Alam | 19 February 1963 | March 1964 | People's Party |
| Minister of War | Ali-Asghar Naghdi | 19 February 1963 | March 1964 | Military |
| Minister of Foreign Affairs | Abbas Aram | 19 February 1963 | March 1964 | |
| Minister of Agriculture | Hasan Arsanjani | 19 February 1963 | 9 March 1963 | |
| Minister of Agriculture | Ismail Riahi | 12 March 1963 | March 1964 | Military |
| Minister of Interior | Mahdi Pirastih | 19 February 1963 | March 1964 | |
| Minister of Labor | Ataollah Khosravani | 19 February 1963 | March 1964 | |
| Minister of Telegraph and Telephone | Hushang Samii | 19 February 1963 | March 1964 | |
| Minister of Finance | Abdolhossein Behnia | 19 February 1963 | March 1964 | Independent |
| Minister of Roads | Nasrollah Moinian | 19 February 1963 | March 1964 | |
| Minister of Justice | Mohammad Baheri | 19 February 1963 | March 1964 | |
| Minister of Health | Ismail Riahi | 19 February 1963 | March 1964 | Military |
| Minister of Education | Parviz Natel-Khanlari | 19 February 1963 | March 1964 | Independent |
| Minister of Economy | Alinaghi Alikhani | 19 February 1963 | March 1964 | Independent |
| Minister of State | Sadegh Amirazizi | 19 February 1963 | March 1964 | Military |
| Minister of State | Gholam Hossein Khoshbin | 19 February 1963 | March 1964 | |
| Minister of State | Jahangir Tafazzoli | 19 February 1963 | March 1964 | People's Party |

== Reshuffles and next cabinet ==
Minister of Agriculture Hasan Arsanjani resigned from the office on 9 March 1963 and was replaced by Ismail Riahi. In fact, Arsanjani was forced to resign from the office and was appointed ambassador to Italy immediately after his resignation.

Six cabinet members were appointed to the incoming cabinet of Hassan Ali Mansour.
