= Hassan Taqizadeh =

Iranian diplomat and politician (1878–1970)

Seyyed Hassan Taghizadeh
- حسن تقی‌زاده
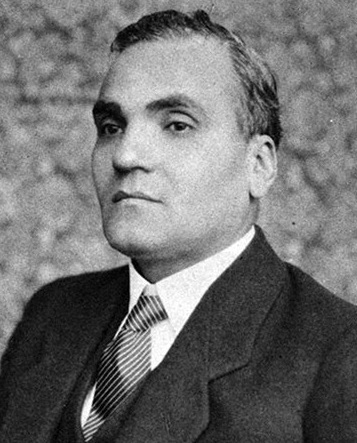

President of Senate of Iran
- In office 1 March 1957 – 1 September 1960
- Monarch: Mohammad Reza Pahlavi
- Preceded by: Ebrahim Hakimi
- Succeeded by: Mohsen Sadr

Minister of Foreign Affairs
- In office 11 June 1926 – 16 September 1926
- Prime Minister: Hassan Mostowfi
- Preceded by: Mohammad Ali Foroughi
- Succeeded by: Ali-Gholi Masoud Ansari

Ambassador of Iran to the United Kingdom
- In office 1941–1947
- Prime Minister: Mohammad Ali Foroughi; Ali Soheili; Ahmad Qavam; Mohammad Sa'ed; Morteza-Qoli Bayat; Ebrahim Hakimi
- Preceded by: Ali Soheili
- Succeeded by: Mohsen Rais
- In office 1929–1930
- Prime Minister: Mehdi Qoli Hedayat
- Preceded by: Hovhannes Masehyan
- Succeeded by: Hossein Ala'

Ambassador of Iran to France
- In office 1933–1935
- Prime Minister: Mohammad Ali Foroughi
- Preceded by: Hossein Ala'
- Succeeded by: Abolqasem Najm

Member of the Senate
- In office 25 January 1950 – 11 September 1967
- Constituency: Tabriz

Member of the National Consultative Assembly
- In office 17 July 1947 – 25 January 1950
- Constituency: Tabriz
- In office 17 October 1906 – 1920
- Constituency: Tabriz

Personal details
- Born: 27 September 1878 Tabriz, Sublime State of Iran
- Died: 28 January 1970 (aged 91) Tehran, Imperial State of Iran
- Resting place: Zahir-od-dowleh cemetery
- Party: Democrat Party; Revival Party
- Spouse: Atieh Taqizadeh
- Education: Najaf Hawzah; American Memorial School in Tabriz

Hasan Taghizadeh (Persian: حسن تقی‌زاده; 27 September 1878 in Tabriz, Iran – 28 January 1970 in Tehran, Iran) was an influential Iranian politician and diplomat. He served during the Qajar era under the reign of Mohammad Ali Shah Qajar, as well as the Pahlavi era under the reigns of Reza Shah and Mohammad Reza Shah. Taqizadeh was also a prominent scholar, and his studies on Iranian calendars remain reference work up until now.

Although in the modern political history Taqizadeh is known as a secular politician, who believed that "outwardly and inwardly, in body and in spirit, Iran must become Europeanized", he came from a traditional Islamic Sayyed-family (descendant of Muhammad). His father, Sayyed Taqi, was a clergyman and when Sayyed Hasan became a mullah, it seemed likely that he would follow in his father's footsteps. From an early age Taqizadeh showed interest in enlightened ideas and the Western concept of constitutionalism. This interest can be traced back to the socio-political sphere in which Taqizadeh became an adult. He grew up in Tabriz, the capital city of East Azerbaijan province, which was the gateway to the modern and progressive ideas coming from Russia and especially Western Europe. During, and following, World War I and World War II, Taqizadeh was the most influential person in Iran who supported the interests of Germany against Russia and Britain.

== Biography ==
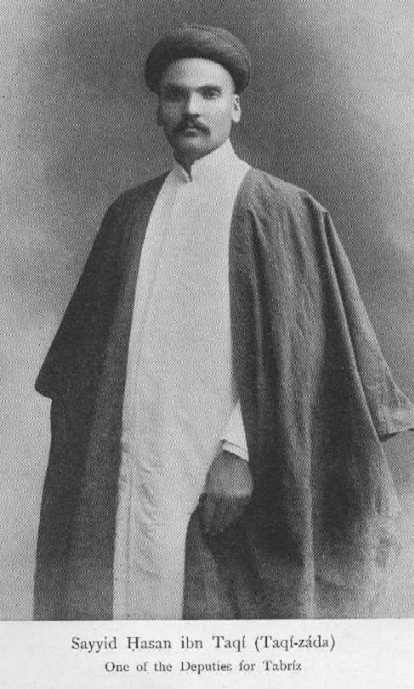
Sayyed Hasan Teqizadeh (around 1906)

Taqizadeh was of Azerbaijani origin. Taqizadeh secretly studied French and English for the purpose of becoming acquainted with the Western Age of Enlightenment and modern political thoughts. Nevertheless, he became a mullah and remained one until the period in which the traditional Iranian political and socio-economic system disintegrated and the modern Iranian nation-state was formed. As early as the beginning of his political career he confronted the corrupt and despotic régime of the Qajar princes, who seemed unable to prevent the decay of their dynasty. Convinced of the destructive consequences of the despotism and corruption for the political and socio-economic development of Iran, Taqizadeh actively participated in the Constitutional Revolution (Mashruteh Revolution), which resulted in the foundation of the Majles (Parliament - مجلس شورای ملی). From this period onwards he developed into a secular enlightened politician. In 1908, his life was saved by Claude Stokes a British military attaché who allowed him to take refuge in the legation compound. He was then secured safe passage to England where he worked with Edward Granville Browne to lobby the parliament for support of the constitutionalist movement.

In 1909, under the guidance of Taqizadeh the first modern pro German political party, the Ferqeh-ye Demokrat-e Iran (Democratic Party of Iran), was founded in Iran. Shortly after the outbreak of World War I, Taqizadeh allied with Germany against Russia and Britain. In Berlin he established the Komiteh-ye Iran (Committee of Iran), and together with other prominent Iranian intellectuals, he published the influential periodical Kaveh (1916–1922), which was distributed in Europe as well as in Iran. Kaveh was a political and literary journal which greatly contributed to the creation of the Iranian consciousness and national identity. This journal emphasized the need for national independence, and internal reforms, especially secular and educational ones.

Under the reign of Reza Shah Pahlavi (1925–1941), Taqizadeh contributed to the formation of the modern Iranian nation-state. During his political career of seventy years, Taqizadeh served as parliamentarian, governor-general of Khorasan province, minister of Roads and Transportation, minister of Finance, and ambassador to the United Kingdom and France. Although at the time of the Constitutional Revolution he opposed the formation of the Senate (Majles-e Sena, مجلس سنا — defunct since 1979, following adoption of a new constitution), in 1950, during the imperial government of Mohammad Reza Shah Pahlavi (1941–1978), he became its president. Taqizadeh described his life as a "tempestuous life" (Zendegi-ye Tufani), which he later used as the title of his autobiography.

Taqizadeh's views are not characterised by ideological continuity, but by many breaks in the course of his life, which have contributed to the difficulty of writing a consistent account of his life. Taqizadeh was a natural politician. If he was convinced that his alliance with a person or country would further interests of Iran, he often was ready to ally himself with them. Similarly, he would abandon his allies if he believed that his alliance would be detrimental to his country. The following two quotations are indicative of the divergence of views that exist concerning Taqizadeh:

"He [Taqizadeh] had won deserved fame by his fearless independence and wonderful grasp of political affairs. There is something so sympathetic in his face, so attractive, with eyes sparkling with cheerful animation. (...). If I am not mistaken he is of those whose genius is capable of inspiring great enthusiasm, great sacrifices, and whose influence leaves a lasting impression of the history of nations." (Edward Granville Browne)

"In which position was Taqizadeh true and sincere? What were the motives of that contradictory behaviour? He was not adept at political truth and honour." (Fereydun Adamiyat)

Views vary as to the degree to which Taqizadeh served the interests of Iran and her people. Some experts believe that he made the Iranian interests secondary to that of the United Kingdom during the period of the Constitutional Revolution, and to that of Germany during World War I. Others suggest that he allied with the United Kingdom with the intention of protecting Iran against the Russian expansionist policies. They are of the opinion that Taqizadeh was a supporter of the Iranian constitution and that during World War I, he allied with Germany to oppose the Anglo-Russian influence which was aimed at undermining Iran's independence. In addition, they believe that in 1942 Taqizadeh attempted to bring about a close relationship between Iran and the United States in order to guarantee a balance of powers conducive to Iran's independence.

== Chronology of Taqizadeh's life ==
Hassan Taqizadeh was born on 27 September 1878 in Tabriz. In 1896, he established the Tarbiyat (Education) school, a bookshop, and a pharmacy in Tabriz with associates. 1898: Taught physics at Loqmaniya in Tabriz. Translated the book 'Ajaeb-e Asemani (Astrnomie Populaire) by Camille Flammarion.

In 1898, he taught physics at the Loqmaniya school in Tabriz and translated ‘Ajaeb-e Asemani (Astronomie Populaire) by Camille Flammarion. Between 1899 and 1900, he studied English at the American Memorial School in Tabriz, a Presbyterian mission institution.

From January 1903 to January 1904, he published the magazine Ganjineh-ye Fonun (Treasure of Sciences). In 1904, he travelled to the Caucasus, Constantinople, Egypt, and Beirut, and published the discourse Tahqiq-e Ahval-e kononi-ye Iran ba Mohakemat-e Tarikhi in the Cairo-based newspaper Hekmat. He returned to Tabriz in October 1905, and moved to Tehran in September 1906, where he published articles in Neda-ye Vatan (Voice of Nation). In October 1906, he was elected by the merchants of Tabriz as a deputy to the First Majles. He contributed articles to Sur-e Esrafil and Mosavat (Equality).

In June 1908, he was exiled by order of Mohammad Ali Shah and left Iran for Europe. In September 1908, he organized political activities in the United Kingdom. He returned to Tabriz in November 1908.

After the constitutionalist victory in August 1909, he arrived in Tehran and joined the "Temporarily Board of Directors". He was elected to the Second Majles and, in October 1909, became the parliamentary leader of Ferqeh-ye Demokrat-e Iran (Democratic Party of Iran).

In 1910, following the assassination of Sayyed Abdullah Behbahani, he left Tehran and remained in Tabriz for several months. He relocated to Constantinople in October 1910, residing there for nearly two years, and departed for Europe in 1911.

In June 1913, he travelled to New York, where he remained for nineteen months and published four political articles in French in the journal Revue du Monde Musulman, addressing developments in Iran, the Ottoman Empire, and Arabic regions.

In January 1915, he left the United States for Berlin, travelling through the Netherlands. From January 1916 to March 1922, he published the periodical Kaveh (Blacksmith), in collaboration with writers such as Sayyed Mohammad-Ali Jamalzadeh and Hossein Kazemzadeh.

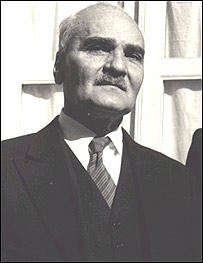
Taghizadeh in 1967

In January 1922, he went to Moscow as a state representative to negotiate a friendship agreement, remaining there for one and a half years. In 1923, he married a German citizen.

He returned to Iran in July 1924, was elected to the Fifth Majles, and served on the Ma'aref (Cultural Affairs) Commission. In June 1926, he travelled to the United States as Iran’s official representative to the Philadelphia Sesquicentennial Exposition of 1926, and joined the "Council of Founders" of the "Society of National Opuses".

In 1927, he was elected to the Sixth Majles. In 1928, he was appointed Governor-general of Khorasan. In 1929, he became Iranian Minister Plenipotentiary to London. He returned to Iran in March 1930 and served as Minister of Roads and Transport. From August 1930 to August 1933, he held the position of Minister of Finance. In April 1933, he participated in the signing of the oil concession extension.

From November 1933 to July 1934, he served as Minister Plenipotentiary to Paris. In 1934, he travelled to the United Kingdom to give a lecture at the Royal Society of Arts and then relocated to Berlin for fifteen months.

In 1935, he represented Iran at the "International Association of Orientalists" in Rome. In 1936, he began teaching at the School of Oriental Studies (now SOAS), University of London, and later at University of Cambridge during its wartime relocation. In October 1941, he was appointed Iranian ambassador to the United Kingdom. He also served as Chairman of the Iranian delegation to the United Nations regarding the Azerbaijan issue. In 1945, he submitted a formal protest to the United Nations concerning the Russian occupation of Tabriz.

October 1947: Elected deputy from Tabriz to the Fifteenth Majles. Was Chairman of the Iranian Board at the Congress of Orientalists (Cambridge, United Kingdom), Chairman of the Iranian Board at International Congress of Avicenna (Baghdad), Chairman of International Congress of Avicenna (Tehran).

In October 1947, he was elected deputy from Tabriz to the Fifteenth Majles and chaired the Iranian delegations to the Congress of Orientalists in Cambridge, and the Avicenna Congresses in Baghdad and Tehran. From 1949 to 1967, he served as a senator and later as Chairman of the Senate. In 1954, he became a scientific adviser and board member of the Translation Institution and Book Publication, and also participated in the International Congress of Orientalists in Cambridge. In 1957, he chaired the Iranian delegation to the Congress of Orientalists in Munich and taught at Columbia University in the United States. In 1958, he became Chairman of the Iranian Society of Philosophy and Humanities and contributed to the establishment of an offset printing-house. In 1966, he chaired the first International Congress of Iranists in Tehran. He died in Tehran on 28 January 1970.

== See also ==
- Howard Baskerville (1885–1909), the "American Lafayette in Iran".
- Abdolhossein Teymourtash
- List of Iranian senators
- List of ambassadors of Iran to the United Kingdom
- Revival Party

== Books by Taqizadeh ==
- S. H. Taqizadeh, Old Iranian Calendars (Royal Asiatic Society, London, 1938). ISBN 0-7189-0933-X, ISBN 978-0-7189-0933-8.
- Payam Nabarz, and S. H. Taqizadeh, The Persian 'Mar Nameh': The Zoroasterian 'Book of the Snake', Omens and Calendar and The Old Iranian Calendar (Twin Serpents, Oxford, 2006). ISBN 1-905524-25-0, ISBN 978-1-905524-25-9.
