= Kaveh (magazine) =

Persian-language periodical in Berlin, Germany (1916–1922)

Kaveh کاوه
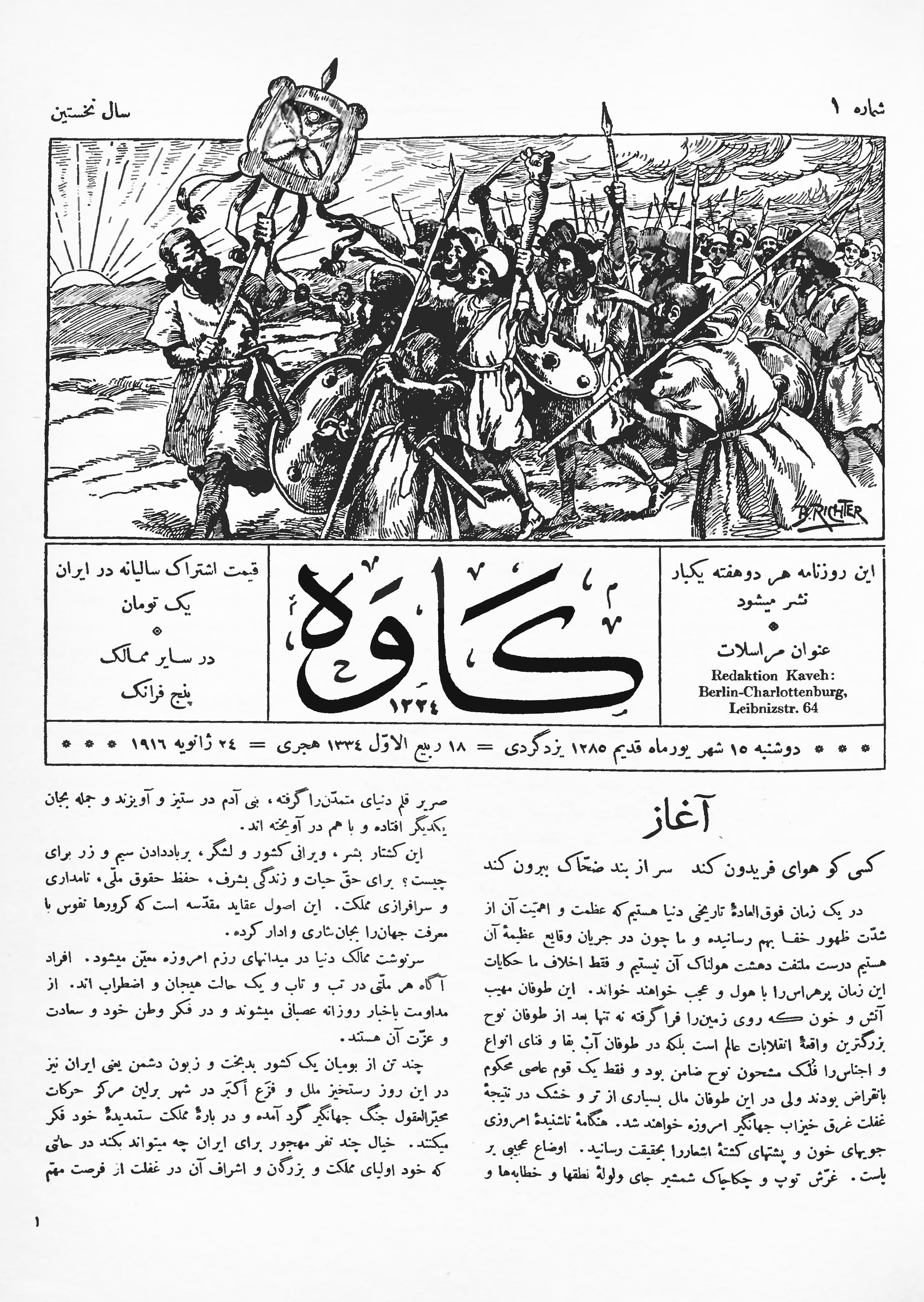
- Editor: Seyyed Hassan Taqizadeh; Mohammad Ali Jamalzadeh; Mohammad Ghazvini
- Categories: Politics
- Frequency: Biweekly; Monthly
- Publisher: Kaviani Press
- First issue: 24 January 1916
- Final issue: 30 March 1922
- Country: Germany
- Based in: Berlin
- Language: Persian
- Website: Kāve

The Persian-speaking exile periodical Kaveh (Persian: کاوه) was founded in 1916 by the Intelligence Agency for the Orient (Intelligence Bureau for the East – NfdO) of the Federal Foreign Office in Berlin. The title refers to an Iranian mythical hero: Kaveh the Blacksmith from Isfahan. The magazine was published by Kaviani Press twice a month between 1916 and 1922 by Sayyed Hassan Taghizadeh, who also wrote articles for the journal Ayandeh from 1925 to 1928, and Mohammad Ali Jamalzade (1892–1997). The contributors were the members of the Iranian Committee for Cooperation with Germany, which was established by Hassan Taqizadeh in 1915.

The process of publication is divided into an old issue, a new issue, and the final special issue. The old issue (1916–1919) consists of four year's issues with 35 numbers, six of them a double number. It was mainly an instrument of propaganda for the German Reich’s policy towards the East. After the end of the war and the dissolution of the NFDÖ, the German Orient Institute (DOI) and the Federal Foreign Office decided on continuing the financing of the periodical. The new issue (1920–1922) is divided into 25 numbers with a double number, although the first year's issue was—in continuation of the old issue—incorrectly labeled as year's issue five instead of year's issue one. As to content, it predominantly addressed literary and scientific topics. By 1922, Kaveh was not funded anymore and thus discontinued.

== Writers ==
Among the writers of this magazine are Allame Mohammad Qazvini, Mohammad Ali Jamalzadeh (pseudonym Shahrokh), Hossein Kazemzadeh Iranshahr, Reza Tarbiat, Esmaeil Amirkhizi, and Abolhassan Hakimi.

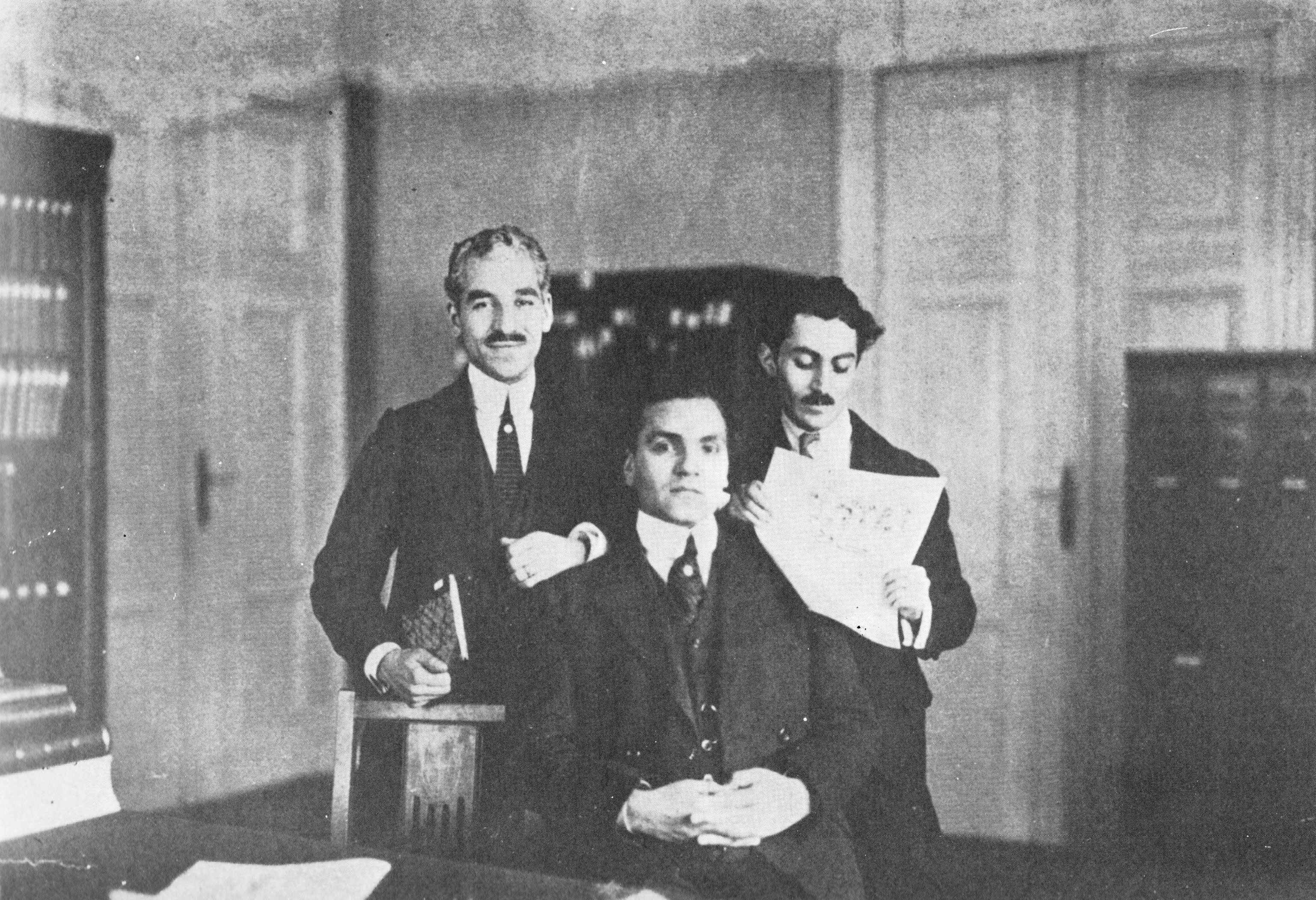
From left: Reza Tarbiat, Hassan Taghizadeh, and Mohammad Ali Jamalzadeh in the editorial office of Kaveh magazine.
