= 3rd Regiment of Horse =

3rd Regiment of Horse or 3rd Horse may refer to:

- 2nd Dragoon Guards (Queen's Bays) ranked as 3rd Horse from 1685 to 1746
- Carabiniers (6th Dragoon Guards), ranked as 3rd (Irish) Horse from 1746 to 1788
- 3rd Skinner's Horse
