= Gholam Hossein Jahanshahi =

Gholam Hossein Jahanshahi (Persian: غلامحسين جهانشاهی) was the second son of Mohammad Shafi Jahanshahi, the former head of the supreme court of Iran.

He was born in 1920 in Tehran where he attended his primary and secondary education prior to attending a degree course in law at the University of Tehran.

Subsequent to completing his undergraduate studies at Tehran University he travelled to France to pursue his academic studies at the University of Paris where he completed a PhD course in economics and law at Sorbonne in 1953.

After completion of his studies he returned to Tehran to rejoin his family and commence his career which spanned over 30 years of service in both Public and Private sectors. Some of his posts in Iran prior to 1979 were:

In 1953, he was appointed as a Senior Advisor to Bank Melli Iran followed by being appointed as a Director General of Ministry of Commerce and Economics. In 1957, he was elected as a member of Parliament where he worked until 1961. In 1961, he was appointed to become a founding member and Deputy Trustee of Pahlavi Foundation to lay the foundations of this organisation. in 1962, he was appointed as the minister of commerce to the first cabinet of Asadollah Alam in 1962. He was close to Shah and had intimate relationship with shah's sister Ashraf Pahlavi. Between 1964 and 1979 he had various posts which include the following:

• Honorary Economics Professor at Tehran University • Member of Senior Board of Directors of Iran Air • President of Board of Directors of Taavoni Va Towzie Bank • President of Board of Directors of Aria Insurance Company • Special Economic Advisor to Prime Minister’s office during Dr Jamshid Amouzegar’s Premiership.

Dr Jahanshahi left Iran after the revolution in 1981 and entered life of semi-retirement in France where he lived until his death in January 2005. He is buried at Passy Cemetery in Paris.
