= Yeki Bud Yeki Nabud =

Collection of Persian short stories

Yeki Bud Yeki Nabud (Persian: یکی بود یکی نبود, lit. 'Once Upon a Time') is a collection of short stories written in 1921 by Mohammad-Ali Jamalzadeh. Its publication made Jamalzadeh a major figure of Persian literature.

The literal translation of the phrase Yeki Bud Yeki Nabud (Once Upon a Time) is One Was There and One Was Not There, or There Was One and There Wasn't One, alluding to an indefinite time and place. Opening a story by Yeki Bud Yeki Nabud prepares the hearers (especially those of very young age) or readers that what they are about to hear or read is not necessarily true.
