= Abolqasem Najm =

Iranian diplomat and politician (1892–1983)

Mirza Abolqasem Najm Najm ol-Molk
- ابولقاسم نجم
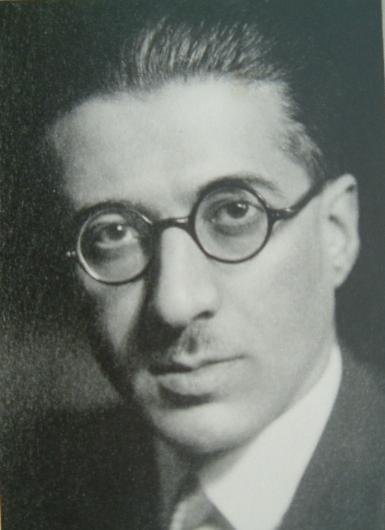
- Abolqaasem Nadjm, as Iranian ambassador to Japan

Minister of Foreign Affairs
- In office 18 November 1945 – 20 January 1946
- Prime Minister: Ebrahim Hakimi
- Preceded by: Anoushirvan Sepahbodi
- Succeeded by: Ahmad Qavam

Minister of Culture
- In office April 1945 – May 1945
- Prime Minister: Ebrahim Hakimi
- Preceded by: Abbas-Qoli Golshayan
- Succeeded by: Kamal Hedayat

Ambassador of Iran to Germany
- In office 1933–1935
- Preceded by: Enayatollah Samiei
- Succeeded by: Mohsen Rais

Ambassador of Iran to Afghanistan
- In office 1943–1945
- Preceded by: Hossein Sami'i
- Succeeded by: Kamal Hedayat

Ambassador of Iran to Japan
- In office March 1940 – May 1942
- Preceded by: Bagher Azimi
- Succeeded by: Mousa Nouri Esfahani

Ambassador of Iran to France
- In office 1935–1937
- Preceded by: Hassan Taqizadeh
- Succeeded by: Anoushirvan Sepahbodi

Personal details
- Born: 11 May 1892 Tehran, Sublime State of Iran
- Died: 19 October 1983 (aged 91) Tehran, Iran
- Resting place: Behesht-e Zahra
- Children: 6

Abolqasem Najm (Persian: ابولقاسم نجم; 11 May 1892 – 19 October 1983), also known as Najm ol-Molk (نجم‌الملک), was an Iranian politician, cabinet minister, and diplomat.

== Early life and education ==
His father was Mirza Mahmoud Shirazi, a merchant, who died when Abolqasem was an infant. His mother was the daughter of Iran's first modern physicist and astronomer, Mirza Abdulqaffar Nadjm ol-Molk. Abdulqaffar, who taught mathematics and physics at Dar ul-Funun, took Abolqasem under his custody after Abolqasem was orphaned. Abolqasem received his basic education from his grandfather and later inherited his grandfather's title of "Nadjm ol-Molk" (star of the nation) after Mirza Abdulqaffar's retirement. He studied at the Tehran School of Political Sciences.

== Diplomatic career ==
After graduation he entered the service of the Ministry of Foreign Affairs in 1912 as an attaché. He was Iran's ambassador to the Third Reich, but was appointed to France upon his own request just prior to the outbreak of the Second World War.

In 1937, when Nadjm was Iran's ambassador to France, the French journal L'Europe Nouvelle criticized the economic condition of Iran. Reza Shah Pahlavi demanded an apology and received one. A French columnist reopened the wound one month later by rehearsing the incident under the punning headline "n'y avait pas la de quoi fouetter un Shah". This was a parody of the French phrase "there was nothing there with which to beat a cat", (playing on the words "shah" and "chat", which is French for cat) suggesting that the King of Kings had made a fuss about nothing. The poor pun was enough to make Reza Shah Pahlavi immediately recall Nadjm to Tehran "for an explanation", and withdraw his promise to lend Iranian art objects to the coming Paris International Exhibition which was planned for May 1937.

Nadjm later served as Iran's ambassador to Japan, until the relations between the two countries were severed due to Iran's declaration of war to the Axis in April 1943. Nadjm was summoned to Tehran and the Japanese delegation were ordered to leave Tehran at the same time. He was then appointed as the ambassador to Afghanistan. As a neighboring country and a Persian-speaking monarchy, Afghanistan was considered very important and the post of ambassador in Kabul had more significance attached to it than it has had in more modern times.

== Political career ==
Abolqaasem Nadjm, second from the right, among Iranian senators of the Pahlavi era

He was the minister of finance in Ebrahim Hakimi's cabinet and tried to fight corruption, but was held back by interference from the royal family. This resulted in his resignation and the downfall of the cabinet. These events are described by Mehdiqoli Hedayat in his memoirs:

On December 23rd [1945], the finance minister presented bills to the Majlis to establish an industrial bank, to divide the crown's personal lands among the peasants, to provide [sufficiently] for the livelihoods of civil servants, and to fight corruption among civil servants. An industrial bank is a good idea, and financially supporting civil servants is necessary. God willing, we shall have a Majlis that would agree to fight corruption. The present Majlis is not up to the task and therefore the bill went forgotten, while it was the best of the bills presented to the Majlis. It showed that the Hakimi cabinet was willing to tackle the problems but the Majlis was unwilling and found excuses not to cooperate. ... Since the intentions [of the Majlis] were clear, Hakimi presented his resignation to His Majesty on the evening of Sunday, January 20th, [1946] and made me sad. ... From the plans offered by the finance minister it was clear that Hakimi was serious in planning fundamental reforms and was not into demagogy. Nothing can be done, as hooligans rule. ... Hakimi's insistence in his support of Nadjm is commendable.

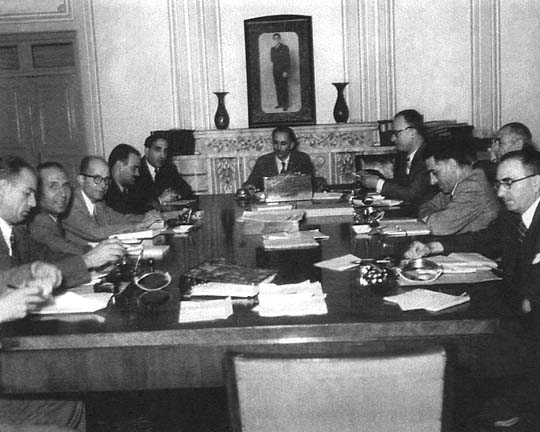
Abolqaasem Nadjm, second from the right, in a meeting of the Iranian Oil Commission.

His last government job was as the governor of the oil-rich Khuzestan province. He resigned from this post, citing interference from the royal family in his day-to-day governance of the province. He was elected as a senator in the first Senate and served only one term. During this time, he was a member of the Oil Commission, a group of politicians whose work eventually resulted in the nationalization of the Iranian oil industry.

== Later years ==
Nadjm spent the last 30 years of his life in retirement. Long after retirement from politics, Nadjm retained his good name as one of the few Pahlavi era politicians who were clean of financial and ethical corruption. Near the end of his life, the Shah, embattled by the Iranian revolution, called on him to return to the government as a part of the reforms intended to quell the revolutionary fervor. The ailing Nadjm could not comply. Abolghassem Nadjm died in Tehran at the age of 89, shortly after the Iranian Revolution.

His brother Mohammad Hossein Nadjm was also an Iranian diplomat, who served as Iranian ambassador to Lebanon and chargé d'affaires in Paris.

== See also ==
- Pahlavi dynasty
- List of prime ministers of Iran
