= Anoushirvan Sepahbodi =

Iranian politician and diplomat

- Persian: انوشیروان سپهبدی

Iranian ambassador to Switzerland
- In office 1929–1931
- Preceded by: Abolhassan Foroughi
- Succeeded by: Mostafaqili Kamal Hedayat

Iranian ambassador to Italy
- In office January 1934 – June 1936
- Preceded by: Mohammad Ebrahim Ghaffari
- Succeeded by: Mahmoud Djam

Iranian ambassador to Russia
- In office June 1936 – April 1938
- Preceded by: Hassan Arfa
- Succeeded by: Mohammad Sa'ed Maraghei

Iranian ambassador to France
- In office julie 1938 – June 1939
- Preceded by: Abolqasem Najm
- Succeeded by: Abdol Hossein Sardari

Iranian ambassador to Spain
- In office June 1939 – June 1939 to 1940
- Preceded by: 1919: Hossein Ala'
- Succeeded by: 1957: Yadollah Azadi

Iranian ambassador to Turkey
- In office 1941–1944
- Preceded by: Bagher Kazemi
- Succeeded by: Ali Gholi Ardalan

Iranian foreign minister
- In office 6 June 1945 – 30 October 1945
- Prime Minister: Mohsen Sadr
- Preceded by: Nasrollah Entezam
- Succeeded by: Abolqasem Najm

Iranian foreign minister
- In office 30 October 1945 – 28 January 1946
- Prime Minister: Ebrahim Hakimi
- Preceded by: Nasrollah Entezam
- Succeeded by: Abolqasem Najm

Iranian ambassador to Egypt
- In office 1954–1959
- Preceded by: Massoud Moazed
- Succeeded by: Jamshid Gharib

Iranian ambassador to the Holy See
- In office 1962–1966
- Preceded by: Mohamed Saed
- Succeeded by: Hossein Ghods Nakhai

Personal details
- Born: 1 January 1888
- Died: 31 December 1982 (aged 94)
- Parent: Mohammad Esmaeil (father)
- Education: Mashir al-Dawlah

Anoushirvan Sepahbodi (Persian: انوشیروان سپهبدی; 1 January 1888 – 31 December 1982) was an Iranian foreign minister and diplomat.

== Career ==
In 1907, he joined the Foreign Service. In 1910, he became Vice Consul in Vladikavkaz. In 1926, he was chief of the protocol. He was deputy head of the Persian mission next the Sublime Porte in the Ottoman Empire, until he was appointed second deputy chairman of the Consulate General in Tbilisi. From 1929 to 1931, he was minister in Bern and was Permanent Representative of the Iranian Government to the League of Nations in Geneva. From July 1933, he served three months as Secretary of State at the Foreign Ministry in Tehran. From the beginning of 1934 he was ambassador to Rome and was simultaneously accredited to the governments in Vienna, Prague and Budapest. From December 19, 1933 to January 4, 1935, he negotiated a British-Persian agreement on arms trafficking in Iran and the Persian Gulf. From June 1936 to April 1938 he was minister in Moscow.

In July 1938, Anoushirvan Sepahbodi became minister in Paris. In 1939, French satirical magazines like Le Canard enchaîné had presented the qualities of a Persian cat as that of Reza Shah. Pierre Dac could not hope for more beautiful publicity, even if he never imagined the scandal that an article of L'Os à moelle (journal) could declencehr. Because the "French satirical newspapers", especially the weekly he runs, made fun of Reza Shah, diplomatic relations were interrupted. A delegation under the direction of General Maxime Weygand had to apologize to Reza Shah. Anoushirvan Sepahbodi was recalled from Paris and in June 1939 accredited to Francisco Franco in Madrid.

From 1941 to 1945, he was ambassador in Ankara. From 29 October 1945 to early 1946, he served as Foreign Minister in the governments of Ebrahim Hakimi and Mohsen Sadr. In February 1946, he became Minister of Justice in the Cabinet of Ahmad Qavām. In September 1946, he was sent to the Paris Peace Conference. In August 1947, he was appointed Advisor to the Government Cabinet. From May 1948, he also advised the Cabinet of Ahmad Qavām. In 1949, he replaced Hakim al-Malik from as royal master of ceremonies, who had been appointed Minister of the Interior. In 1950, as part of the reforms that led to the introduction of the Senate, Mohammad Reza Pahlavi appointed him to his ministre plénipotentiaire in Tehran, a position he held until October 1953. From 1954 to 1959, he was ambassador to Cairo. From 1962 to 1966, he was ambassador to the Holy See. In 1966, he was retired after 60 years of service.
