= Abdolhossein Behnia =

Iranian politician

Abdolhossein Behnia (Persian: عبدالحسین بهنیا), also Latinized as Abdul Husain Behnia, was an Iranian politician who served as minister of finance several times during the reign of Shah Mohammad Reza Pahlavi. He served in the cabinet of Prime Minister Ali Amini and then of Asadollah Alam in the early 1960s.

Behnia was appointed minister of finance to the cabinet of Ali Amini on 9 May 1961. He resigned from office on 9 January 1962 due to the approval of a land reform bill by the cabinet. Behnia argued that the bill was not required.

Behnia was appointed minister of finance to the cabinet formed by Asadollah Alam on 21 July 1962. He was appointed to the same post in the second cabinet of Alam on 19 February 1963.
