= Claude Stokes =

Indian Army officer and diplomat

Claude Stokes CIE DSO OBE
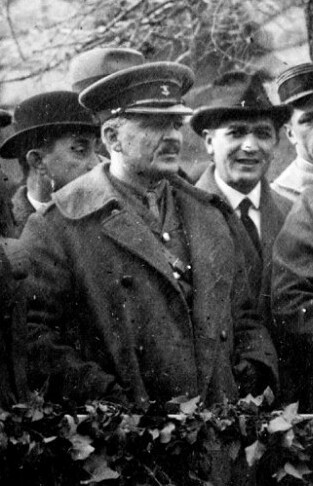
- Stokes at 26 May Celebration. 1919
- Born: Claude Bayfield Stokes; 27 October 1875; Mussoorie, North-Western Provinces, India
- Died: 7 December 1948 (aged 73); South Kensington, London, England
- Occupations: Indian Army Officer and Diplomat

British Vice Consul in Nice
- In office 1931–1940

British High Commissioner in Transcaucasia
- In office 1920–1921
- Monarch: George V
- Prime Minister: David Lloyd George
- Preceded by: Oliver Wardrop
- Succeeded by: Position abolished due to the occupation of Georgia

Colonel Claude Bayfield Stokes CIE DSO OBE (27 October 1875 – 7 December 1948) was an Indian Army officer and diplomat. He served in India and was an intelligence officer with Dunsterforce during the First World War.

Stokes was educated at St John's School, Leatherhead and Sandhurst. He was commissioned into the East Kent Regiment on 28 September 1895 and served on the North West Frontier 1897–98. He transferred to the Indian Army 7 October 1897 and in July 1900 he joined the 3rd Skinner's Horse, a unit of the Indian Army.

Stokes was appointed military attaché to Tehran from 1907 to 1911. During this period he supplied Edward Granville Browne with sensitive intelligence. In 1908 he saved the life of Ali-Akbar Dehkhoda, the Iranian linguist and Hassan Taqizadeh (a subsequent President of Iran), when he allowed him to take refuge in the British Legation compound. He commanded the first detachment of the British Army to go to Baku arriving on 4 August 1918.

He was appointed British High Commissioner in Transcaucasia, based in the Georgian capital of Tiflis, from 1920 to 1921.

He retired from the Indian Army 1 October 1922.

From 1931 to 1940 he was British Vice consul in Nice, France.

== Family life ==
Stokes had married Olga Postovsky in Turkey in the early 1920s and they had a daughter. Stokes died at 22B Roland Gardens in South Kensington London on 7 December 1948.
