= List of ambassadors of Iran to Switzerland =

Coordinates: 33.959279°N 6.842553°W

Ambassador of Iran to Switzerland
- Persian: سفیر ایران در سوییس
- Coat of Arms of Iran
- Incumbent; Mahmoud Barimani since April 4, 2023
- Inaugural holder: Abolhassan Foroughi
- Formation: 1919

The Iranian ambassador in Bern is the official representative of the Government in Tehran to the Government of Switzerland.

== List of representatives ==
| Diplomatic accreditation | Diplomatic accreditation (Solar Hijri calendar) | Ambassador | Persian language | Observations | List of presidents of Iran | List of presidents of the Swiss Confederation | Term end | Term end (Solar Hijri calendar) |
|---|---|---|---|---|---|---|---|---|
| 1919 | 1298 | Ghaffari Zaka | Persian: سهام الدین غفاری ذکاء الدوله | Chargé d'affaires | Ahmad Shah Qajar | Gustave Ador | | |
| 1924 | 1303 | Ghaffari Zaka | Persian: سهام الدین غفاری ذکاء الدوله | envoy Ghaffari, Amir Saham-od-Din (Zuka-ud-Dauleh) Born in Tehran about 1880. The second ... Appointed Persian Minister in Berne 1919–22. Did not venture to return to Persia till the Pahlavi regime was well established in 1931. | Ahmad Shah Qajar | Ernest Chuard | | |
| 1924 | 1303 | Hedayat Mostafa Quli | Persian: مصطفی قلی هدایت فهیم الدوله | Chargé d'affaires Kardar | Ahmad Shah Qajar | Ernest Chuard | 1927 | 1306 |
| 1929 | 1308 | Anoushirvan Sepahbodi | Persian: انوشیروان سپهبدی | | Reza Shah | Robert Haab | 1933 | 1312 |
| 1934 | 1313 | Abolhassan Foroughi | Persian: أبو الحسن فروغي | Abolhassan Foroughi Abolhasan Foroughi, Iranian educator and author and younger brother of Mohammad Ali Foroughi Mirza Abulhasan Froughi (1884 - 9. February 1960) | Reza Shah | Marcel Pilet-Golaz | 1934 | 1313 |
| 1934 | 1317 | Nasrollah Entezam | Persian: نصرالله انتظام | Chargé d'affaires | Reza Shah | Marcel Pilet-Golaz | 1938 | 1319 |
| 1935 | 1313 | Mostafa Adl | Persian: مصطفی عدل | | Reza Shah | Rudolf Minger | 1939 | 1317 |
| 1941 | 1320 | Hossein Ghadimi Navaei | Persian: حسین قدیمی نوائی | Chargé d'affaires | Mohammad Reza Pahlavi | Ernst Wetter | April 25, 1945 | 1324 |
| December 4, 1945 | 1327 | Abol Ghassem Pourévaly | Persian: ابوالقاسم | envoy | Mohammad Reza Pahlavi | Eduard von Steiger | 1947 | 1330 |
| June 29, 1948 | 1327 | Abolghassem Forouhar | Persian: ابوالقاسم فروهر | | Mohammad Reza Pahlavi | Enrico Celio | August 7, 1951 | 1330 |
| 1951 | 1330 | Abdul-Hussein Meykadeh | Persian: عبدالحسین میکده | | Mohammad Reza Pahlavi | Eduard von Steiger | 1953 | 1332 |
| November 6, 1953 | 1332 | Abolghassem Forouhar | Persian: ابوالقاسم فروهر | On April 20, 1957, the mission was upgraded to an embassy. | Mohammad Reza Pahlavi | Philipp Etter | 1957 | 1336 |
| August 7, 1951 | 1336 | Mohammad Ali Homayoundjah | Persian: هرمز قریب | | Mohammad Reza Pahlavi | Hans Streuli | November 5, 1953 | 1341 |
| May 4, 1956 | 1341 | Abolghassem Forouhar | Persian: محمود فروغی | | Mohammad Reza Pahlavi | Markus Feldmann | 1962 | 1341 |
| October 21, 1957 | 1342 | Hormoz Gharib | Persian: جمشید قریب | | Mohammad Reza Pahlavi | Hans Streuli | 1963 | 1344 |
| 1963 | 1341 | Djamchid Gharib | Persian: قریب | Djamchid Gharib spent a large part of his diplomatic career in Turkey, where he was our ambassador, before he retired. In 1978, while spending his summer holidays there - for he knew the country perfectly and had many, Turkish, personal friends - he was told, by the two highest authorities in the Turkish government, Washington was preparing a coup, in Iran, involving certain religious leaders; and they begged Djamchid Gharib to tell the Shah "that he ought not to trust the Americans". Secular Turkey was worried about the possibility of a democratic government being installed in Iran. It was an important message, and, as soon as he returned to Tehran, Gharib asked for an audience with the Shah. He was kept waiting - he no longer had any official position, after all. He confided his information to Hoveyda, who offered to act as an intermediary. Gharib declined this offer, and, several days later, his persistence paid off. He was received, and relayed his message, in detail, to the King, including the identities of his informants. The Shah, annoyed, asked him, "whom have you told about this conversation of yours, in Ankara?" "The Minister to the Court asked about my business," the former diplomat, "and I declined to reveal it; but I said a word or two, without the least detail, to Nahavandi, and to my son-in-law, Doctor Shirvani, "Shirvani was a professor at Tehran University and an elected Deputy. "Forget this for ever," snapped the Shah commandingly, "and tell them to forget it too, for it's no more than drawing-room chatter!" | Mohammad Reza Pahlavi | Willy Spühler | 1965 | 1343 |
| September 10, 1965 | 1344 | Majid Rahnema | Persian: مجید رهنما | | Mohammad Reza Pahlavi | Hans-Peter Tschudi | 1967 | 1346 |
| January 30, 1968 | 1346 | Hossein Ali Loghman Adham | Persian: حسینعلی لقمان ادهم | | Mohammad Reza Pahlavi | Roger Bonvin | November 5, 1953 | 1349 |
| January 8, 1971 | 1349 | Mahmoud Esfandiary | Persian: محمود اسفندیاری | | Mohammad Reza Pahlavi | Rudolf Gnägi | 1975 | 1354 |
| 1975 | 1354 | Abbas Montasser | Persian: سید مرتضی میرعلی مرتضایی | | Mohammad Reza Pahlavi | Pierre Graber | 1978 | 1357 |
| January 9, 1976 | 1357 | Assadollah Fahimi | Persian: اسدالله فهیمی | until the first Islamic revolution | Mohammad Reza Pahlavi | Rudolf Gnägi | 1978 | 1357 |
| May 1, 1979 | 1358 | Mahmoud Lavassani | Persian: محمود لواسانی | Chargé d'affaires | Mohammad Reza Pahlavi | Hans Hürlimann | 1979 | 1358 |
| 1979 | 1358 | Gholam-Ali Fariwar-Tehrani | Persian: غلامعلی فریور تهر | | Mohammad Reza Pahlavi | Hans Hürlimann | 1980 | 1359 |
| 1980 | 1359 | Sa'id Amir Divani | Persian: سعید امیر دیوانی | Chargé d'affaires | Abolhassan Banisadr | Georges-André Chevallaz | 1981 | 1360 |
| 1981 | 1360 | Mohammad Ali Nematollahi | Persian: علی نعمت اللهی | | Abolhassan Banisadr | Kurt Furgler | 1986 | 1365 |
| 1986 | 1365 | Mohammed Hossein Malaek | Persian: محمد حسین ملائک | | Ali Khamenei | Alphons Egli | 1990 | 1369 |
| 1990 | 1369 | Mohammad Reza Alborzi | Persian: محمدرضا البرزی | | Akbar Hashemi Rafsanjani | Arnold Koller | 1997 | 1376 |
| 1997 | 1376 | KiaTabatabaee | Persian: کیا طباطبایی | | Mohammad Khatami | Arnold Koller | 2001 | 1380 |
| 2001 | 1380 | Majid Takht Ravanchi | Persian: مجید تخت روانچی | | Mohammad Khatami | Moritz Leuenberger | 2005 | 1384 |
| 2005 | 1384 | Keivan Imani | Persian: کیوان ایمانی | | Mahmoud Ahmadinejad | Samuel Schmid | 2009 | 1388 |
| 2014 | 1393 | Alireza Salari | Persian: علیرضا سالاری شریف | | Hassan Rouhani | Didier Burkhalter | 2009 | 1388 |
| 2014 | 1393 | Gholamali Khosro, Gholamali Khoshroo | Persian: غلامعلی خوشرو | | Hassan Rouhani | Didier Burkhalter | 2014 | 1393 |
| 2014 | 1393 | Mehdi Abedi | Persian: مهدی عابدی | Chargé d'affaires | Hassan Rouhani | Didier Burkhalter | 2016 | 1395 |
| 2016 | 1395 | Alireza Sabzali | Persian: علیرضا سبزعلی | Chargé d'affaires | Hassan Rouhani | Johann Schneider-Ammann | 2018 | 1397 |
| 2018 | 1397 | Mohammadreza Haji Karim Jabbari | Persian: محمدرضا حاج کریم جباری | | Hassan Rouhani | Alain Berset | 2022 | 1400 |
| 2022 | 1400 | Mansoureh Sharifi Sadr | Persian: منصوره شریفی صدر | Chargé d'affaires | Ebrahim Raisi | Ignazio Cassis | 2022 | 1401 |
| 2022 | 1401 | Mahmoud Hassanalizadeh | Persian: محمود حسنعلیزاده | Chargé d'affaires | Ebrahim Raisi | Ignazio Cassis | 2023 | 1402 |
| April 4, 2023 | 1402 | Mahmoud Barimani | Persian: محمود بریمانی | | Ebrahim Raisi | Alain Berset | | |

== See also ==
List of ambassadors to Switzerland
