= List of Iranian senators =

Following is a list of Iranian senators (in alphabetical order by last name) who are notable for their work.

- Ali Dashti
- Mahmoud Hessabi
- Mohsen Sadr
- Jafar Sharif-Emami
- Hassan Taqizadeh
