= Iranshahr High School =

High school in Yazd, Iran

- دبیرستان ایرانشهر

Location
- Iranshahr; Yazd, Yazd province Iran
- Coordinates: 31.890278°N 54.363056°E

Information
- Established: 1928

Iranshahr High School (Persian: دبیرستان ایرانشهر) is a historic public high school in Yazd, Iran. It was founded in 1928 and holds the distinction of being the first public high school established in the city.

== History ==
Iranshahr High School was established in the late Qajar and early Pahlavi eras and by 1932–33 had become the only government-run secondary school in Yazd. The school was named after its location in the Iranshahr neighborhood of Yazd.

== Architecture ==
The school's current building was completed in 1934 and was designed by French archaeologist and architect André Godard, with assistance from Maxime Siroux. The design blended modern educational architecture with traditional Persian elements, using local Yazdi materials such as brick, adobe, tile, and plaster.

The building is structured around a central courtyard and includes wide arcaded corridors and vaulted ceilings constructed with the Yazdi Bandi technique, suited to Yazd's arid climate. Deep porticoes and narrow, tall sash windows were used to mitigate the region's intense sun and heat.

Ornamental features include over 11,000 square meters of glazed tiles, decorative stone basecourses, and a variety of arches inspired by Persian architecture—such as “ovoid” arches reminiscent of the Sasanian tradition, and grooved pointed arches from the Safavid tradition.

== Heritage status ==
In recognition of its architectural and historical importance, Iranshahr High School was designated a National Heritage Site of Iran on 25 June 1998, and listed as entry No. 2048 in the national registry.

== Notable alumni and faculty ==
- Jahangir Tafazzoli (1914–1990), Iranian journalist and politician, taught French at Iranshahr High School early in his career.
