= Anoushirvan Khan Eyn ol-Molk =

Iranian aristocrat (died 1866)

Anoushirvan Khan
- Eyn ol-Molk; Etezad od-Dowleh
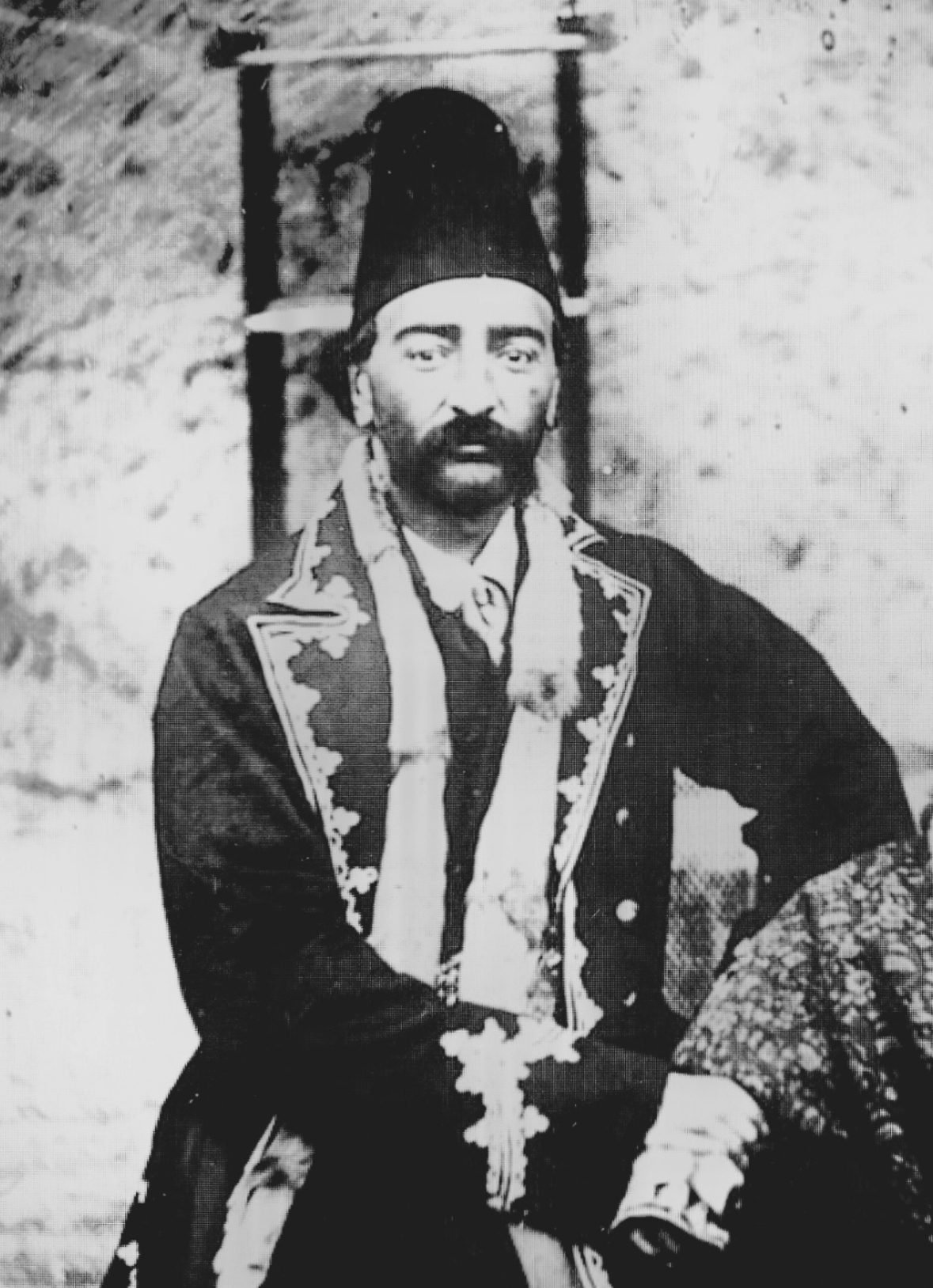

Il khan (chief) of Qajar tribe
- Tenure: 1861–1866
- Died: 1866
- Spouse: Ezzat ed-Dowleh
- Dynasty: Qajar
- Father: Soleyman Khan Qajar Qovanlou
- Mother: Malekzadeh Khanoum Qajar
- Military career
- Allegiance: Qajar Iran
- Branch: Artillery (1866)
- Rank: Commander-in-chief
- Commands: Mazandaran, Gorgan and Gilan Garrisons

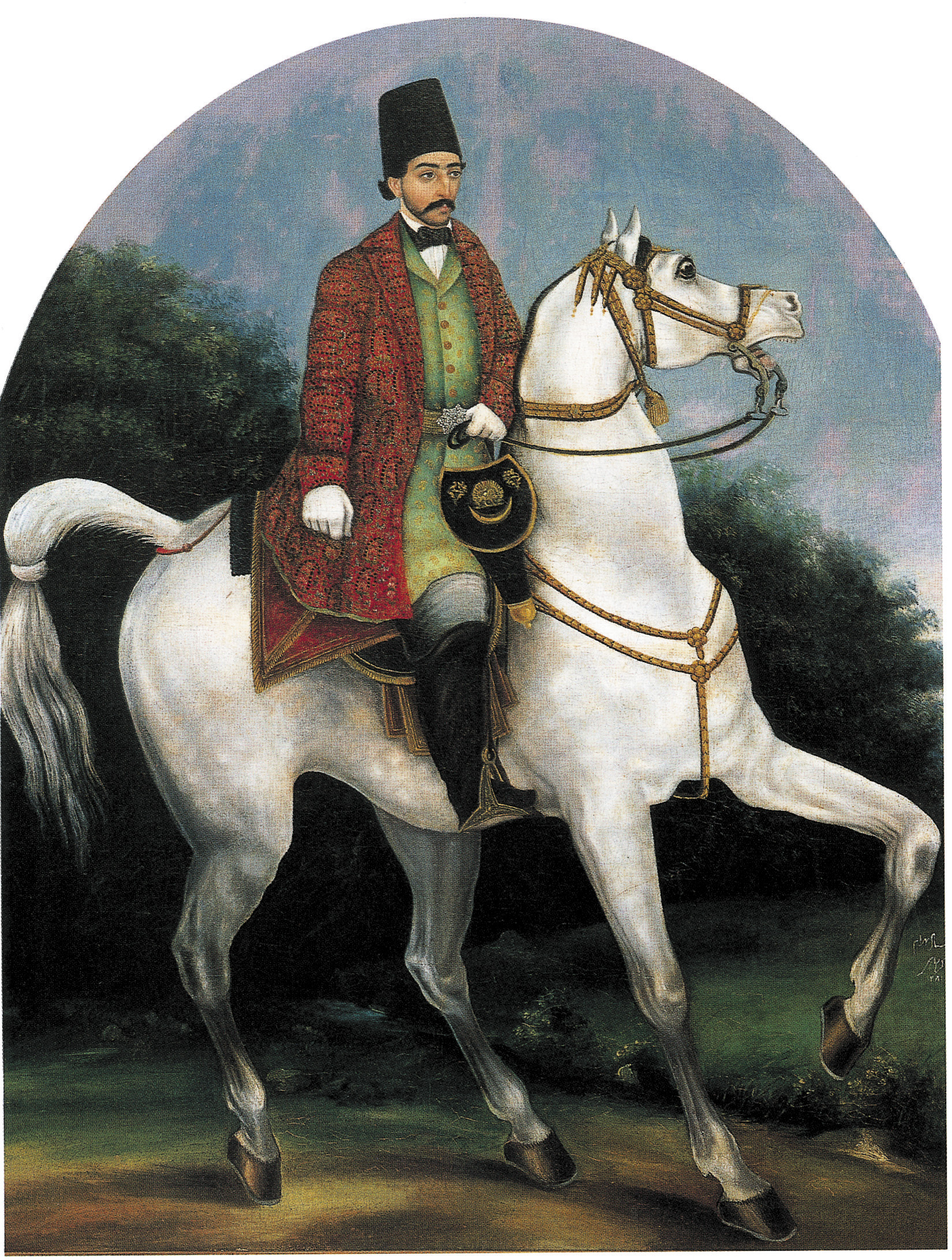
Eyn ol-Molk, head of the Qajar tribe

Anoushirvan (Shir) Khan Qajar Qovanlou (Persian: انوشیروان خان قاجار قوانلو‌) also known by titles Eyn ol-Molk (Persian: عین‌الملک, lit. 'Eye of the Realm') and Etezad od-Dowleh (Persian: اعتضادالدوله‌, lit. 'Support of State'; died 1866) was an Iranian aristocrat, general and courtier.

== Early life ==
Anoushirvan Khan Qajar Qovanlou, in short Shir Khan, was the only child of Soleyman Khan Qajar Qovanlou 'Khan-e Khanan' with Princess Malekzadeh Khanoum Qajar. Both of his parents were grandchildren of Fath-Ali Shah Qajar. Therefore, he grew up in one of the most powerful and influential aristocratic families in Iran of the era. Since childhood he belonged to the small group of intimate friends and relatives of his cousin Naser al-Din Shah Qajar. In 1854, he received the title Eyn ol-Molk and two years later he became Khan Salar, Master of the Royal Kitchens, one of the most important and responsible jobs at court as it entailed preventing any possible attempt at poisoning the monarch.

== Career ==
Around 1860, he married his cousin Princess Ezzat ed-Dowleh, sister of Naser al-Din Shah Qajar, after she divorced her second husband Mirza Kazem Khan 'Nezam ol-Molk'. In 1861, he was chosen as ilkhan (chief) of the Qajars (tribe) and in 1863 he was appointed Governor of Mazandaran, Gorgan and Astarabad and sometime later also of Qazvin, Khuzestan, Mahallat, Shahroud and Bastam. From 1865 he was commander-in-chief of the armies of Mazandaran, Gorgan and Gilan. The actual work in the provinces was done by his half brother Mohammad Ali Khan, as his responsibilities as Khan Salar made it necessary to remain in the proximity of the Shah. In 1864, he was presented with the title Etezad od-Dowleh; a title once carried by his great-grandfather, Soleyman Khan Qajar. In 1866, the Shah gave him the rank of commander-in-chief of Artillery, but the same year he died of the Plague.

== Family ==
He had issue with Ezzat od-Dowleh and with other wives (among them Ghodrat Malek Khanoum). The descendants in the male line later took the family name Sepahbody (Sepahbodi) as a reference to Shir Khan's military rank. Two of his daughters married to Seyyed Sadr ed-Din 'Sadr ol-Ashraf I' from Mahallat, the uncle of Mohsen Sadr. Through one of his sons Shir Khan is the great-grandfather of Farhad Sepahbody and through one of this daughters Shir Khan is the great-great-grandfather of Hossein Eslambolchi.
