= Hossein Eslambolchi =

American businessman

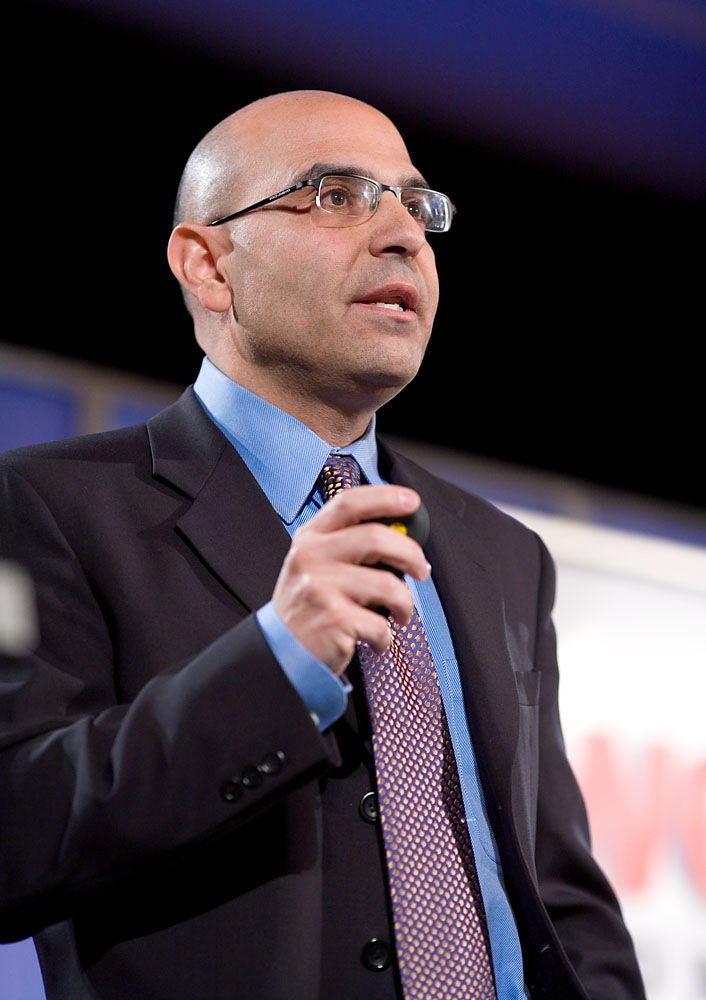
Eslambolchi at the Web 2.0 Conference in 2005.

Hossein Eslambolchi (born September 1957) is an Iranian-American businessman.

Eslambolchi is known for his prominent role in AT&T where he was global chief technology and information officer beginning in 2005. He developed the beamforming used in 5G mobile systems and worked on ultrasound technology.

== Early life and career ==
=== Education ===
Eslambolchi graduated with highest honors from the University of California, San Diego, earning BS, MS, Ph.D., and a postdoctorate in Applied Physics.

=== Work at AT&T ===
Eslambolchi joined AT&T Bell Laboratories in 1986. He was soon appointed global Chief Technology Officer, Global Chief Information Officer, President and CEO of AT&T Labs, President & CEO of AT&T Global Network Services. Beginning in 2001, he became a Section 16(b) Officer of the company. Eslambolchi also served as a member of AT&T's governing Executive Committee. He left AT&T soon after its merger with SBC Communications in January 2006.

As Chief Technology Officer, Eslambolchi advised AT&T's leadership on its corporate strategy from 2001 to 2005. He advocated an MPLS architecture based on Ethernet allowing all services to run on IP and work together with connectivity to any device through location-based services.

As President and CEO of AT&T Labs & Chief Information Officer, Eslambolchi oversaw the development of an IP/MPLS network to succeed AT&T's legacy voice and data networks. He designed the Service Over IP architecture to migrate these legacy services over to new architecture.

As President of Global Network Services, Eslambolchi was responsible for AT&T's global network and Global Network Operations Center (GNOC), of which he was the primary engineer.

As Chief Information and Investment Officer, he implemented "Concept of One" and "Concept of Zero" business processes. While moving AT&T's legacy networks onto an IP/MPLS platform, he also directed the convergence of the operating support and customer service systems underlying the network.

=== Continued service ===
From 2010 through 2013, Eslambolchi served on the board of directors for Clearwire. He served on the board of trustees for SUSMA and as technical advisor to the University of California's School of Engineering, where he started the CNS Center for bringing together various computing and engineering fields.

== Personal life ==
Eslambolchi is the great-grandson of Iranian prime minister Mohsen Sadr. He is also a descendant of the famous Persian aristocrat Anoushirvan Khan Eyn ol-Molk; through Shir Khan, Eslambolchi is a descendant of the 19th-century Persian Shah Fath-Ali Shah Qajar.

== Awards ==
- AT&T Science & Technology Medal and AT&T Significant Patent Award, 1997
- AT&T Fellow, AT&T's highest technical honor, 1999
- Inventor of the Year, Research & Development Council of New Jersey, 2002
- Innovator of the Year, Cisco Systems, 2003
- #1 "Mover and Shaker" in Telecommunications, Light Reading, 2003
- Top Ten Innovators of 2003, Executive Council of New York
- Premier 100 IT Leaders of 2004, Computerworld Magazine
- 10 Internet Business Leaders of 2005, Cisco IQ Magazine
- Top 10 Most Influential CTOs of 2005, InfoWorld
- IEEE Chairman Quality Award for improving the reliability of IP networks worldwide, 2008
- Inventor of the Year, Research & Development Council of New Jersey, 2013
- Awarded Ellis Island Medal of Honor, May 2017
- Top 100 influential technology leaders of the 21st century, Sun Microsystems
- Top 100 alumni at the University of California, San Diego

== Publications ==
- Over 1400+ worldwide patents (received, pending, and in-preparation)
- Eslambolchi, Hossein. 2020 Vision: Business Transformation Through Technology Innovation, 2006. ISBN 978-0-929306-39-1
- Hushyar, Kaveh; Braun, Harald; Eslambolchi, Hossein. Telecom Extreme Transformation: The Road to a Digital Service Provider, 2021. ISBN 978-0-367-75013-8
