= Mohammad-Ali Jamalzadeh =

Iranian writer (1892–1997)

Mohammad-Ali Jamālzādeh Esfahani محمدعلی جمالزاده اصفهانی
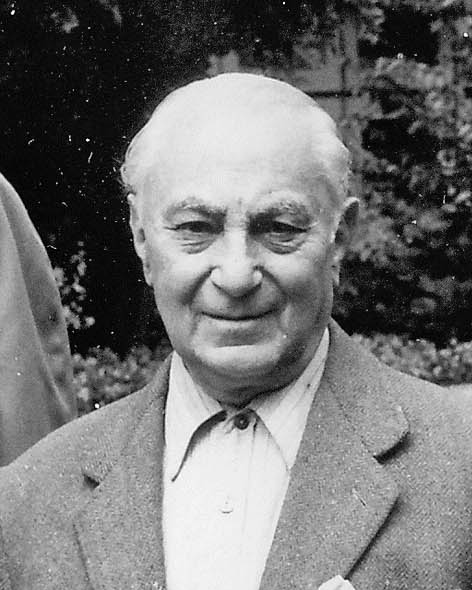
- Mohammad Ali Jamalzadeh in 1977
- Born: Mohammad-Ali Jamālzādeh Esfahani; 13 January 1892; Isfahan, Sublime State of Iran
- Died: 8 November 1997 (aged 105); Geneva, Switzerland
- Resting place: Petit-Saconnex Cemetery
- Known for: Short story
- Notable work: Yeki Bud Yeki Nabud (Once Upon a Time)

Mohammad-Ali Jamālzādeh Esfahani (Persian: محمدعلی جمالزاده اصفهانی; 13 January 1892 in Isfahan, Iran – 8 November 1997 in Geneva, Switzerland) was one of the most prominent writers of Iran in the 20th century, best known for his unique style of humour. In view of his vast influence over Persian short story writing, he is often referred to as the father of this genre in Iran.

== Biography ==
=== Early years and family ===
Sayyed Mohammad-Ali Jamalzadeh was born in Isfahan into a middle-class family. The date of his birth is uncertain; years between 1892 and 1896 have been mentioned and, by the end of his life, even he himself was uncertain of the actual year. The year 1895 has traditionally been taken as the year of his birth.

His father, Sayyid Jamal al-Din Va'iz, was a progressive and popular pro-constitutional mullah, preacher and writer who became a constitutional revolutionary, delivering raging sermons that inspired his son but cost him his life; he was executed in 1908 on the order of Mohammad Ali Shah Qajar who considered him among the most dangerous of his enemies.

=== Living abroad ===
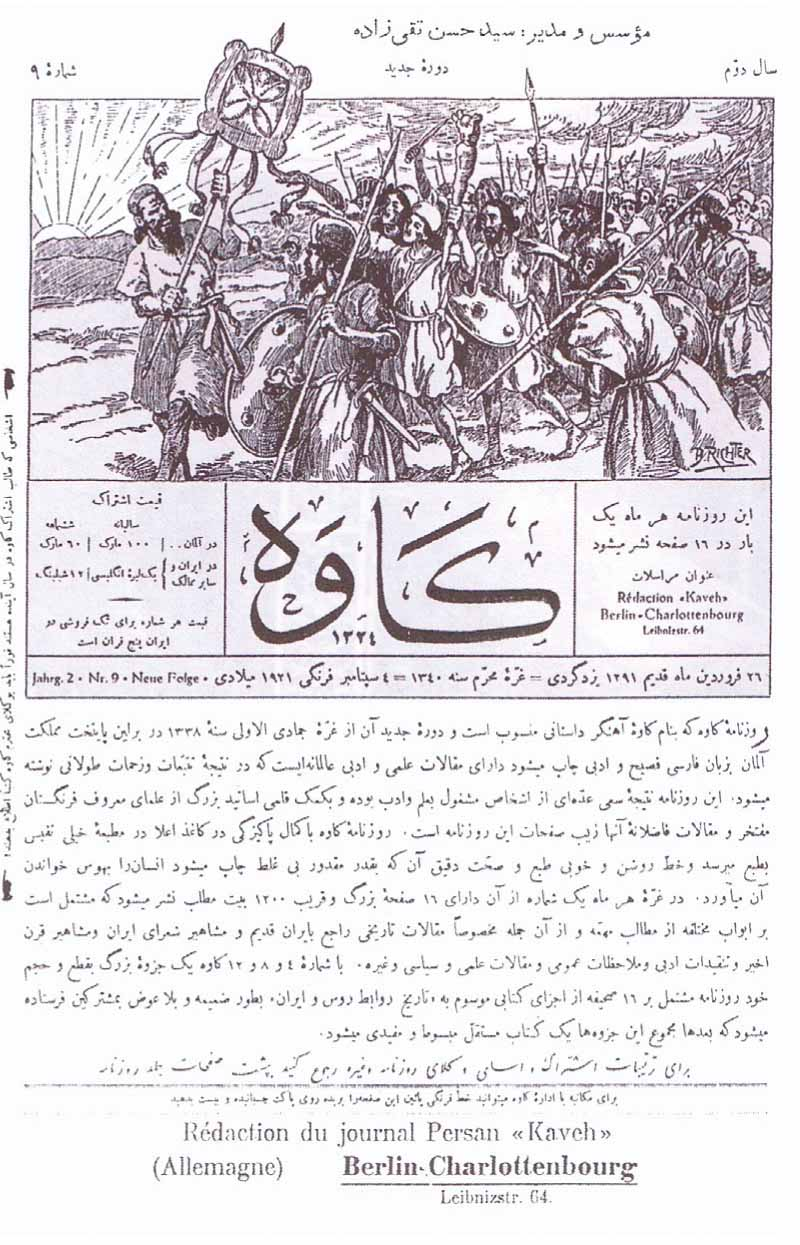
Kāveh (کاوه), Vol. 2, No. 9, 4 September 1921, Berlin

The young Jamalzadeh lived in Iran only until he was twelve or thirteen. Thereafter, he lived in Lebanon, where he attended the Aintoura Catholic School (1908) near Beirut, in France (1910), and in Switzerland where he studied law at University of Lausanne and later at University of Burgundy in Dijon, France.

After his father's death, Jamalzadeh's life took a turn for the worse, but thanks to many supporting friends and to occasional paid teaching jobs, he survived starvation. By the time of World War I, still in his youth, he joined the Committee of Iranian Patriots (Komita-ye Melliyun-e Irāni) in Berlin and, in 1915, founded a newspaper (Rastakhiz) for this group in Baghdad. In a trip from Baghdad to Istanbul, Jamalzadeh witnessed the Armenian genocide and encountered many corpses during his journey. He wrote of his experiences and eyewitness accounts decades later in two books entitled "Qatl-e Amm-e Armanian" (Armenian massacres) and "Qatl o ḡārat-e Arāmaneh dar Torkiye" (On the massacres of Armenians in Turkey). During this time he also worked for the periodical Kāveh (1916). In 1917, he published his first book Ganj-e Shayegan (The Worthy Treasure). An overview of Iran of the start of the 20th century, Ganj-e Shayegan deals with Iran's socio-political and economic problems, a major contribution which bridges the gap between literature and science. In the same year he represented the Nationalists at the World Congress of Socialists in Stockholm. His later years, until 1931 when he settled in Geneva and worked thereafter for the International Labour Organization, were spent in temporary employments, such as one at the Iranian embassy in Berlin.

During all these years, Jamalzadeh had very little contact with Iran but continued to write about the lives of contemporary Iranians. His preoccupation with the use of language and his Dickensian style of writing, including repetitions, piling up of adjectives, and using popular phrases, quickly remind the reader of Jamalzadeh's background and of his sincere intentions.

== Literary works ==
=== Once Upon a Time (Yeki Bud Yeki Nabud) ===
Jamalzadeh's major work Yeki Bud Yeki Nabud (یکی بود یکی نبود - Once Upon a Time), published in 1921 in Berlin, did not reach Iran until a year later, and when it did, it was not received favourably. The public, especially the clergy, loathed Jamalzadeh's portrayal of their country to the degree that copies of the book were burned in public squares. A collection of six short stories, Yeki Bud Yeki Nabud deals with the social and political conditions in Iran around the start of the 20th century, a subject that up to then had been outside the purview of writers and poets in general. Moreover, interwoven with this is a considerable amount of militancy against Western interference in Iran and an open mockery of religious fanaticism. Jamalzadeh's simple and colloquial style, combined with a measured humour, enhanced the impact of his writings, making his stories such as Yeki Bud Yeki Nabud and Farsi Shekar Ast (Persian is Sugar) even more poignant than otherwise would be the case. This hostile public reaction affected Jamalzadeh to the degree that for the next twenty years he refrained from engaging in any literary activities.

==== What's Sauce for the Goose... (Bil-e Dig, Bil-e Choqondar) ====
One of the most well known short stories from Jamalzadeh's "Once Upon A Time" is Bil-e Dig, Bil-e Choqondar (بیله دیگ بیله چغندر) known in English as "What's Sauce for the Goose." This first person narrative follows the story of an Iranian man in Europe who, in his reminiscence of Iranian bathhouses, meets a masseur with whom he engages in deep conversation.

The story begins with the unnamed narrator absorbed in an internal monologue on habits and their tendency to return, even after a person tries to break them. The narrator then, almost as if returning to habit, expresses his sudden urge to attend a hammam (bathhouse) in order to satisfy his previously expressed feelings of nostalgia. Upon arrival to the bathhouse, the narrator was disappointed to find that the Turkish-style bathhouses of Europe were no match for their Iranian counterparts that he knew and loved; however, he was pleasantly surprised to be massaged by an Iranian-trained masseur. By engaging in conversation with the masseur, the narrator underestimates the servant's background and realises some of the flaws of Iranian society and culture. After learning that masseur was an advisor to several Iranian ministries, the narrator is immediately overcome with skepticism and disbelief. The masseur continued to tell his story of being placed into the role of an advisor, the respect and high position that he gained by chance, and his less-than-positive judgment of Iranians from an outsider's perspective. One of the negative aspects he alludes is the dishonesty of Iranians, illustrated in his story of being robbed by thieves and given empty promises. After listening to the masseur, the narrator slyly retorts with a Persian proverb "Bil-e dig, bil-e choqondar." After unsuccessfully attempting to explain the proverb, the narrator's time at the bathhouse is done. Disappointed that their time is up, the masseur hands the man his diary in which he details his encounters in Iran.

Upon his return home, the narrator begins to read the diary. He quickly realizes that the stories in the diary are written by an uneducated man, who views Iran with the prejudice that the whole world should be like Europe. In one observation, the masseur comments on the absence of women from public life. Obviously, women are not actually absent from the society but appear in public fully covered in body-length black veils. Due to not being introduced to the specifics of local culture, the European masseur took them for "strange types of priests".

The masseur also comments on the social stratification in Iranian society. He writes that the men in Iran are distinguished by the color of their hats and that there are three groups: The Yellow Hats, the White Hats, and the Black Hats. As the narrator keeps reading the descriptions for each group, he learns that they represent the peasants, the clerics, and the government, respectively. The European observer cannot understand why the Yellow Hats, who sacrifice all their belongings to the other two classes hold so much respect for them at the same time. He says: "They are so insistent upon this that often both they themselves and their families starve to death or die from the cold and are buried without so much as a shroud, while the Black Hats and the White Hats have profited so much from the Yellow Hats' suffering that they have no idea how to spend their money." Once the narrator read through the whole diary, he mails it back to the masseur with a little note. In it, he includes the translation of the proverb he previously failed to explain.

The European masseur's observations come off as naïve and limited due to his ignorance, but they serve as a social satire that Jamalzadeh uses as a literary strategy to exemplify a humorous but eye-opening perspective on Iranian society.

A scholarly analysis that has been done by Clause V. Pederson regards the modernist views that Jamalzadeh's shows in his literature. There is no doubt Western influences in modern Persian literature, including Mohammad-Ali Jamalzadeh's works, but many of the cultural and political influences in these stories are often overlooked along with its message that reflects on a new worldview. Jamalzadeh's literary works express a modernist view of the world where there is no fixed world order and the individual is the center of the universe that has the freedom to use his rational and intellectual capabilities to understand, interpret, and create their own surrounding reality subjectively and relatively. Examples of these ideas are shown in Jamalzadeh's short story "Bile dig, Bile Choghondar" ("What's Sauce for the Goose") which demonstrates these views on individuality, rational faculties, interpretation, the relativity of truth, and reality. An example that the author uses to recount this point across is in the Moayyed and Sprachman translation: "Habit truly is like a beggar from Samaria or a pet cat or a Jew owed money or an Isfahani jakesraker: no matter how many times you throw it out one door, it'll always return through another". Here he does not refer to regular ordinary habit but is referring to the habits that blind people and doesn't allow people to see the world as it truly is. In the story, the narrator meets a French masseur who has been to Iran with his former master. From the story that the masseur tells about Iran, a ridiculing and exaggerated story, the narrator then realizes that his own understanding of Iran has been clouded by ill memory and habit. He realizes that the European masseur's understanding is limited and partly wrong. Although he feels humiliated at the fact that he did not understand his own culture, he realizes that this new knowledge helps him to understand Western culture and also Iranian culture better than the masseur does because the masseur has not allowed himself to see the world as it really is.

=== Later writings ===
He began writing again in the 1940s, but by that time he had lost the dexterity that imparted conciseness, novelty of form, originality of ideas, a biting sense of humor, and a tight structure to his earlier stories. Tautologism, a tendency toward using sage remarks, making mystical and philosophical speculations, and disregard for order became the hallmark of his later writings. Sahra-ye Mahshar (Armageddon) (1947), Talkh-o Shirin (Bitter and Sweet) (1955), Kohne va Now (Old and New) (1959), Qair az Khoda Hichkas Nabud (None Existed Except God) (1961), Asman-o Risman (The Blue Yonder and Rope) (1965), Qesse-ha-ye Kutah Bara-ye Bachcheha-ye Rish-dar (Short Stories for Bearded Children [i.e. for Adults]) (1974), and Qesse-ye Ma be Akhar Rasid (Thus Ends Our Story) (1979) were written during this phase of his literary activity. Although Jamalzadeh continued to criticize the court and the clergy, some of his works of this period lack his original unique Persian style, even though he is at times as biting and as veracious as in his earlier writings.

In addition to Persian, Jamalzadeh was fluent in French, German, and Arabic. He translated many books from the latter languages into Persian.

Jamalzadeh was nominated for the 1965, 1967, and 1969 Nobel Prize in Literature by Richard N. Frye, Ehsan Yarshater, and Jes Peter Asmussen respectively.

== Death ==
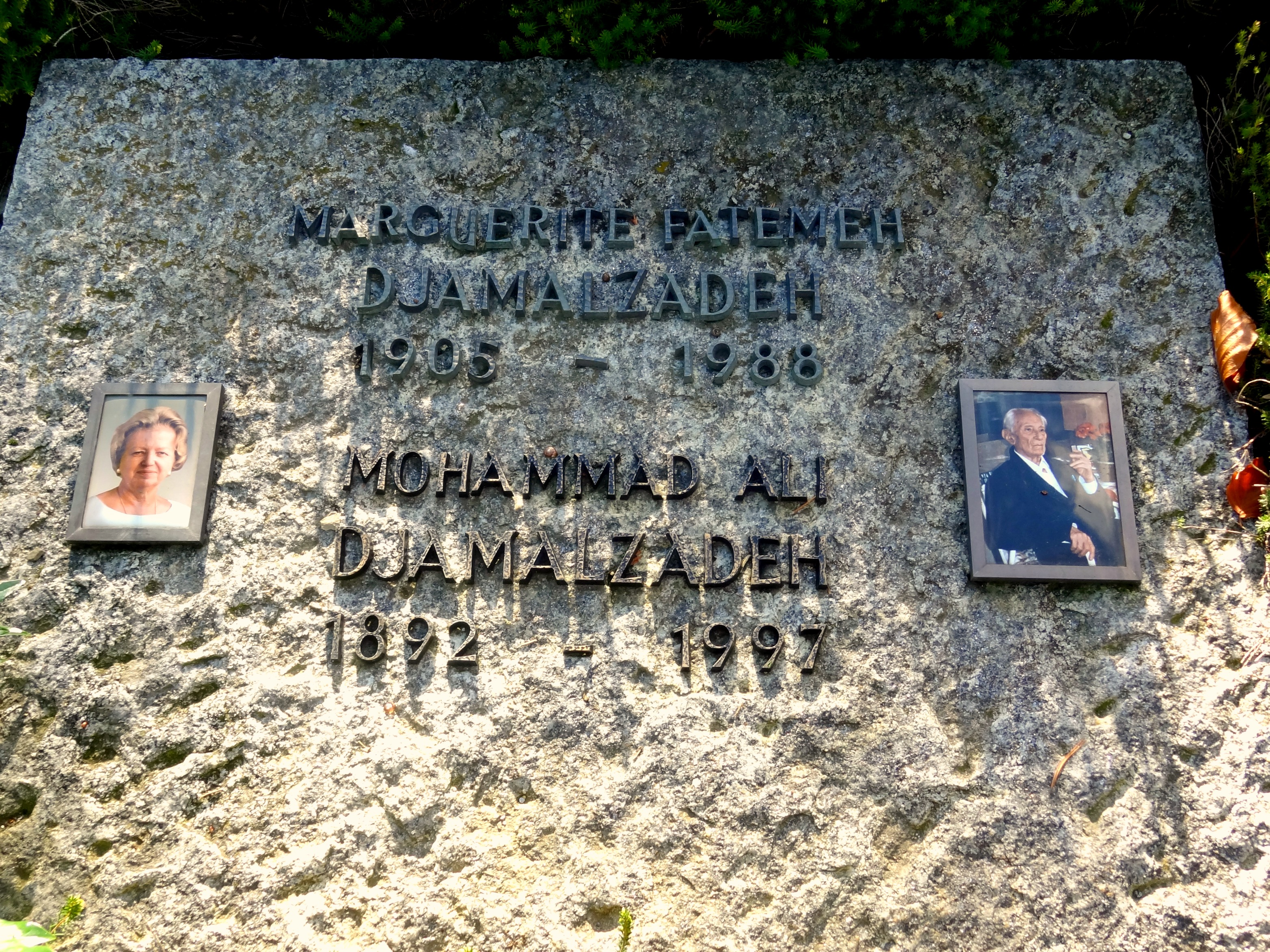
Tomb of Mohammad-Ali Jamalzadeh and his wife

Jamalzadeh died at the age of 105, in Geneva, Switzerland. His tomb is located in the "Petit-Saconnex" cemetery (block number 22).

== Personal life ==
In 1914, Jamalzadeh married his first wife, Josephine, a Swiss woman and a fellow student in Dijon. In 1931 and during his residence in Geneva, Jamalzadeh married his second wife, the German Margaret Eggert.

== Bibliography ==
=== Writings ===
- Shaygan's Treasure (1916)
- Iran and Russia Relations (1921)
- Yeki Bud Yeki Nabud (Once Upon a Time) (1921)
- Prosperity Garden (1938)
- Sadi's Councils (1938)
- Lunatic Asylum (1941)
- Story of Stories (1941)
- Amo Hosseinali's Biography (1942)
- Qoltashan Collection (1946)
- Gathering Desert (1947)
- Rah-Ab Nameh (1947)
- A Man with Thousand Professions (1947)
- Masoumeh Shirazi [play] (1954)
- Bitter and Sweet (1955)
- Sar va Tah Yeh Karbas (1956)
- Masterpiece (1958)
- Pipe's Voice (1958)
- Old and New (1959)
- Jamali's Kashkoul (1960)
- None Existed Except God (1961)
- Seven Countries (1961)
- Soil and Human (1961)
- Vulgar Encyclopedia (1962)
- Earth, Landlord and Peasant (1962)
- Mysteries' Small Box (1963)
- Cock-and-Bull (1964)
- Method of Writing and Story Writing (1966)
- Shiraz and Humor of Us, Iranian (1966)
- Short Stories for Bearded Children (1973)
- Isfahan (1973)
- Nightingale (1973)
- Qanbar Ali, A Generous of Shiraz (1973)
- Our Story is Finished (1978)
- Familiar Democracy (1984)
- Acquaintance with Hafiz Thesis (1988)

=== Translation ===
- Le Café du Surat by Bernardin de Saint-Pierre (1921)
- The Story of Mankind by Hendrik Willem van Loon (1955)
- Wilhelm Tell by Friedrich Schiller (1956)
- Don Carlos by Friedrich Schiller (1956)
- Selected Stories by Molière (1957)
- L'Avare by Molière (1957)
- Democracy and Human Prestige (1959)
- En Folkerfiende by Henrik Ibsen (1961)
- Turkmen War by Comte de Gobineau (1973)

== See also ==
- Witnesses and testimonies of the Armenian genocide
- Gholām-Hossein Sā'edi
