= Mohsen Sadr =

Iranian politician (1871–1962)

Seyyed Mohsen Sadr Sadr ol-Ashraf
- محسن صدر
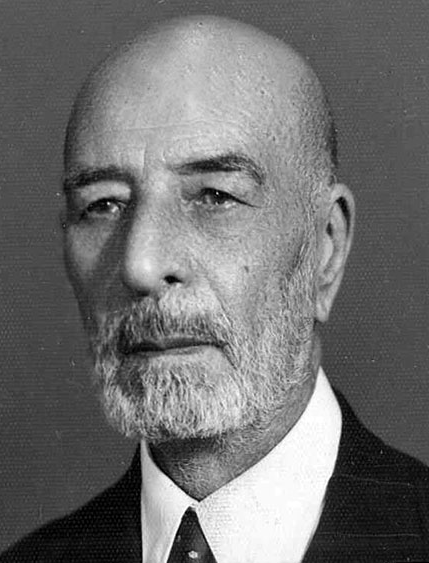
- Sadr in 1945

26th Prime Minister of Iran
- In office 6 June 1945 – 30 October 1945
- Monarch: Mohammad Reza Pahlavi
- Preceded by: Ebrahim Hakimi
- Succeeded by: Ebrahim Hakimi

President of the Senate
- In office 11 September 1960 – 11 September 1964
- Preceded by: Hassan Taqizadeh
- Succeeded by: Jafar Sharif-Emami

Personal details
- Born: 1871 Mahallat, Markazi province, Sublime State of Iran
- Died: 19 October 1962 (aged 91) Tehran, Imperial State of Iran

Mohsen Sadr (Persian: محسن صدر; 1871 – 19 October 1962), titled Sadr ol-Ashraf [II] (Persian: صدرالاشراف), was a judge and politician, the prime minister of Iran and the president of the Senate of Iran. During his government, Iran became one of the founding states of the United Nations by signing the Charter of the United Nations.

== Life and politics ==
He was born in Mahallat in Markazi in 1871 as the son of Seyyed Hossein 'Fakhr ol-Zakerin', a wealthy clergyman, by a daughter of Hajji Molla Akbar Khorassani. He received his title "Sadr ol-Ashraf' after the death of his paternal uncle Seyyed Sadr ed-Din 'Sadr ol-Ashraf', who had been the son-in-law of the very influential courtier Anoushirvan Khan Eyn ol-Molk (a cousin of Naser al-Din Shah Qajar). Mohsen 'Sadr ol-Ashraf' served as royal tutor to one of Naser al-Din Shah's sons, and served in many senior government positions in his career, such as President of the High Court of Justice in Tehran, Governor of Khorasan, Speaker of Majlis, Minister of The Judiciary (five times), Prime Minister in 1945 and Senator (twice). After the death of Prince Abdol-Hossein Mirza Farmanfarma in 1939 he acted as the executor of the last will of Farmanfarma and guardian of his children.

=== Cabinet ===
His cabinet was composed as below.

Portfolio	Minister	Took office	Left office	Party
Prime Minister	Mohsen Sadr	6 June 1945	21 October 1945	Independent
Minister of Foreign Affairs	Anoushirvan Sepahbodi	6 June 1945	21 October 1945	Independent
Minister of War	Ebrahim Zand	6 June 1945	21 October 1945	Independent
Minister of the Interior	Mohsen Sadr	6 June 1945	21 October 1945	Independent
Minister of Finance	Mahmud Badr	6 June 1945	21 October 1945	Independent
Minister of Justice	Hassan-Ali Kamal Hedayat	6 June 1945	21 October 1945	Independent
Minister of Culture	Gholam-Hossein Rahnama	6 June 1945	21 October 1945	Independent
Minister of Post and Telegraph	Seyyed Ahmad Etebar	6 June 1945	13 June 1945	National Union
Minister of Roads	Nader Araste	6 June 1945	21 October 1945	Independent
Minister of Commerce, Industry and Arts	Abbas-Gholi Golshaian	6 June 1945	21 October 1945	Independent
Minister of Agriculture	Mohammad Nakhaei	6 June 1945	21 October 1945	Independent
Minister of Health	Saeed Malek	6 June 1945	21 October 1945	Independent
Minister Counselor	Mostafa Adl	6 June 1945	21 October 1945	Independent

== Death ==
Mohsen Sadr died of brain cancer at the age of 91 in Tehran on 19 October 1962. He had three sons and seven daughters. His first child was "Abul Qasem Sadr". Hossein Eslambolchi, an Iranian-American experimental physicist and engineer, is the grandson of Abul Qasem Sadr and the great-grandchild of Mohsen Sadr.

== See also ==
- Pahlavi dynasty
- List of prime ministers of Iran
- List of Iranian senators

Political offices
Preceded by Ebrahim Hakimi	Prime Minister of Iran; 1945	Succeeded by Ebrahim Hakimi
Preceded by Hasan Taqizadeh	President of Senate of Iran; 1960–1964	Succeeded by Jafar Sharif-Emami
