= Gholam-Ali Farivar =

Iranian engineer and politician

Ambassador of Iran to Switzerland
- In office 1979–1980
- Prime Minister: Mehdi Bazargan

Minister of Industries
- In office 1961–1962
- Prime Minister: Ali Amini

Member of the Parliament
- In office 7 March 1944 – 12 March 1946
- Constituency: Tehran

Personal details
- Born: Gholam-Ali Farivar Tehrani; 1905/1906 Bandar-e Anzali, Iran
- Party: Iran Party (1944–1947); Comrades Party (1942–1944)
- Education: University of Paris
- Occupation: Engineer

Gholam-Ali Farivar (Persian: غلامعلی فریور) was an Iranian engineer and politician.

== Early life and education ==
Farivar was born in 1905 or 1906 in a middle-class family in Enzeli, Gilan Province. He studied engineering at University of Paris.

== Career ==
He was one of the early leaders of Iran Party, having previously been a member of the Comrades Party's central committee. In the 1944 Iranian legislative election, he was elected to the parliament along with five other fellow members of Iran Party. He was among figures who played a role in establishment of the United Front of Progressive Parties, a coalition including the communist Tudeh Party of Iran.

He served as industry minister in the cabinet of Ali Amini. For some time, he was also chairman of board of directors of Mortgage Bank of Iran, as well as an advisor to the Ministry of Commerce.

After the Iranian Revolution, Farivar was appointed as the ambassador to Switzerland.
