= Hossein Sami'i =

Iranian poet and politician (1876–1954)

Hossein Sami'i Adib al Saltaneh
- حسین سمیعی
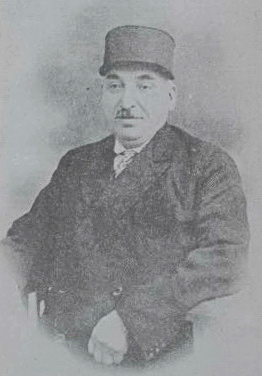
- Hossein Sami'i, 1930s
- Born: Hossein ibn Hassan Sami'i Gilani; 1876; Rasht, Sublime State of Iran
- Died: 5 February 1954 (aged 77–78); Tehran, Imperial State of Iran
- Other name: Adib al-Saltaneh

Mirza Hossein Khan Sami'i (Persian: حسین سمیعی; 1876 – 5 February 1954) also known by his court title of Adib al Saltaneh (Persian: ادیب السلطنه) was an Iranian writer, poet, diplomat and politician. He served in many positions in both the Qajar and Pahlavi governments.

He worked first in the Foreign Ministry and then as head of the Office of Neighboring Governments.

He entered the Ministry of the Interior in 1910 and was deputy of Rasht in the National Consultative Assembly 1914–1918.

== Early life ==
Hossein ibn Hassan Sami'i Gilani was born in 1876 in Rasht into a notable family. He spent his childhood in Tehran and Kermanshah and studied Arabic and literary sciences at Kermanshah.

He was taught by Abu al-Foqara' al-Isfahani and Mirza Salik al-Kermanshahi. He began writing poetry from age eleven under his pen name of ‘Aṭā.

== Career ==
He returned to Tehran in 1893 and worked in the Foreign Ministry in the Qajar court during the reign of Mozaffar ad-Din Shah Qajar. He moved to the Ministry of Interior after the constitutional revolution in 1907. He was elected as a deputy for Rasht in the third session of the National Consultative Assembly in 1914. He moved between the ministries of Interior and General Benefits. He was later appointed governor of Tehran.

He wrote books, taught political science, and was appointed president of the Iranian Literary Academy. He headed the scout organization. In 1935, after the establishment of the First Academy of Sciences, he was elected a member.

In 1940, he was promoted to Iran's Ambassador to Afghanistan. He served for almost two years and then returned to the presidency of the Academy. He died on 5 February 1953 and was buried in the Ibn Babawayh Cemetery, south of Tehran.

== Works ==
- Rules of writing
- Memories of immigration travel
- Poetry Diwan
- The spirit of speech
- Persian grammar
- Human desires
- Sisters
- Al-Siyasah

He translated The History of Afghanistan by Jamal al-Din al-Afghani from Arabic to Persian.
