= Sadegh Amirazizi =

Iranian army general and politician (1905 – 1992)

- صادق امیرعزیزی
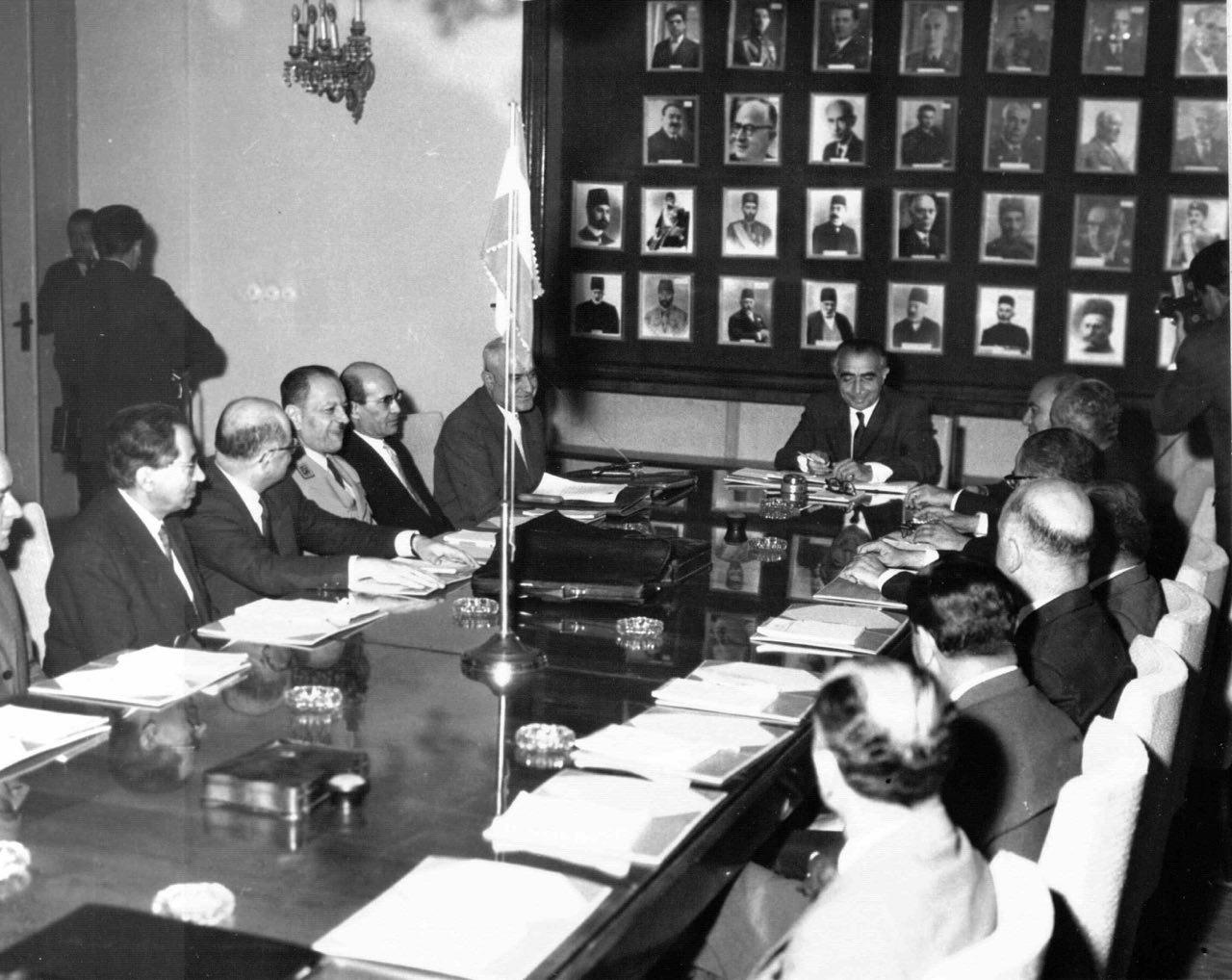
- General Amirazizi (Third sitting on the left)

Minister of State
- In office 19 February 1963 – March 1964
- Prime Minister: Asadollah Alam

Minister of Interior
- In office 20 February 1961 – 18 February 1963
- Prime Minister: Jafar Sharif Emami; Ali Amini; Asadollah Alam
- Preceded by: Mehdi Qoli Alavi Moghadam
- Succeeded by: Seyyed Mehdi Pirasteh

Commander of the Iranian Gendarmerie
- In office 1958–1961
- Preceded by: Aligholi Golpira
- Succeeded by: Mohammad Hossein Zargham

Personal details
- Born: 1905 Tehran, Qajar Iran
- Died: 1992 (aged 86–87) Paris, France
- Resting place: Behest e Zahra, Tehran

Military service
- Allegiance: Qajar Iran (1924–1925); Pahlavi Iran (1925–1966)
- Branch/service: Ground Force
- Years of service: 1924–1968
- Rank: Lieutenant general

Sadegh Amirazizi (Persian: صادق امیرعزیزی; 1905–1992) was an Imperial Iranian Army general and a politician who served as the minister of interior three times during the reign of Shah Mohammad Reza Pahlavi. Following the 1979 revolution he left Iran and settled in Paris, France. He died there in 1992 and buried in Behest e Zahra Cemetery in Iran.

== Early life and education ==
Amirazizi was born in Tehran in 1905. His father was Seyyed Azizollah. After completing his primary and secondary education at Tarbiat School he entered the officer's college. He joined the army headed by Reza Shah in October 1924 with the rank of second lieutenant and began to work an aide to the Gilan Independent Regiment.

In 1941 Amirazizi was promoted to the rank of colonel and studied at the University of War.

== Career ==
Following his graduation Amirazizi worked at different divisions of the army. In 1946, he was named the deputy dean of the officer's college in Tehran and was promoted to the rank of major general in 1947. He served as the head of the appeals court during the trial of Mohammad-Vali Gharani, an Iranian military officer, who was accused of planning a coup d'état against the Pahlavi regime in 1958. He was appointed minister of interior in March 1961 to the cabinet led by Prime Minister Jafar Sharif Emami. He continued to serve in the same post in the next cabinet which was formed by Ali Amini on 9 May 1961. Amirazizi was one of four ministers who did not sign the land reform law dated January 1962. Amirazizi held the same post in the following cabinet led by Prime Minister Asadollah Alam and remained in office until 18 February 1963. He was appointed minister of state to Alam's second cabinet which was formed on 19 February 1963 and held post until March 1964 when the cabinet was dissolved after the resignation of the prime minister.

Amirazizi was named governor of Khorasan in May 1963 and then became the deputy head of Astan Quds Razavi, a royal foundation which managed the Imam Reza shrine. In early 1978, he was appointed patron of Astan Quds Razavi, but soon he resigned from the office. Amirazizi was named minister of interior to the military government led by Gholam Reza Azhari.

== Later life and death ==
After the 1979 revolution Amirazizi settled in Paris and died there in 1992. He was buried in Behesht-e Zahra Cemetery in Iran.

=== Recognition ===
Amirazizi was the recipient of Spain's order of civil merit.
