= 3rd Skinner's Horse =

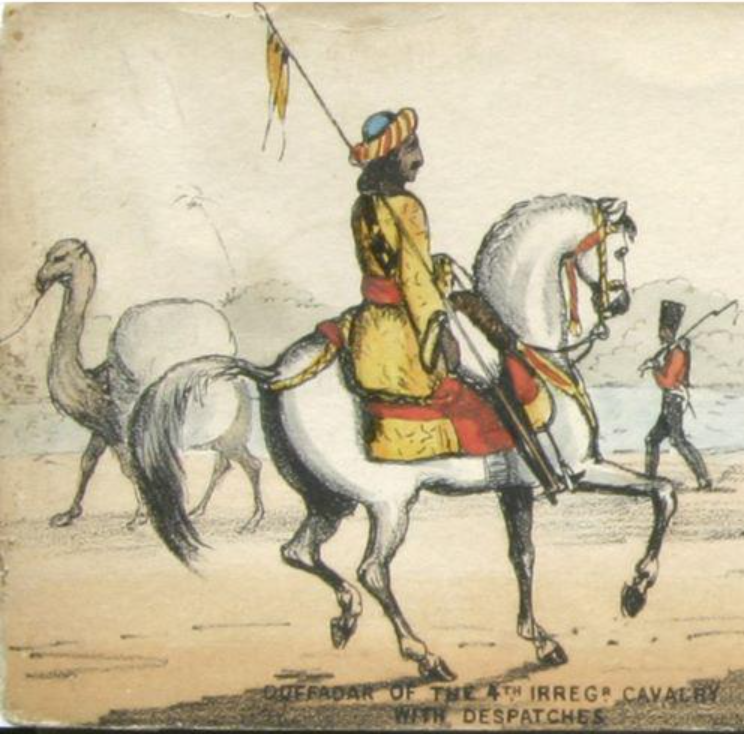
- Officer in the 4th Irregular Cavalry
- Active: 1814–1921
- Country: British India
- Branch: British Indian Army
- Type: Cavalry
- Battle honours: Afghanistan; Ghuznee 1839; Khelat; Maharajpore; Moodkee; Ferozeshah 1845; Aliwal; Kandahar 1880; Afghanistan 1879-80; Punjab Frontier; The Great War; France and Flanders, 1914-15-16; Baluchistan, 1918; The Third Aghan War

The 3rd Skinner's Horse was a cavalry regiment of the British Indian Army. It was originally raised at Hansi by Lt.-Col. James Skinner as the 2nd Regiment of Skinner's Horse in 1814, the various changes and amalgamations are listed below.

- 1814 2nd Regiment of Skinner's Horse
- 1821 Baddeley's Frontier Horse
- 1823 4th (Baddeley's) Local Horse
- 1840 4th Irregular Cavalry
- 1861 3rd Regiment of Bengal Cavalry
- 1901 3rd Bengal Cavalry (Skinner's Horse)
- 1903 3rd Skinner's Horse.
- 1921 1st/3rd Skinner's Horse.
- 1922 1st Duke of York's Own Skinner's Horse

== 1914-21 ==
3rd Skinner's Horse was sent to the Western Front, France, with the 7th (Meerut) Cavalry Brigade in late 1914, remaining there until their transfer back to India in 1916, then they were posted to the Loralai for service on the North West Frontier. They saw action during the Third Anglo-Afghan War of 1919.

Claude Stokes, intelligence officer for the Dunsterforce, was an officer with the 3rd Skinner's Horse.

It amalgamated with the 1st Duke of York's Own Lancers Skinner's Horse at Sialkot in June 1921 and so ceased to have a separate identity, its traditions and honours being carried forward by the new regiment.
