= Allame Mohammad Qazvini =

Iranian literary figure (1876–1949)

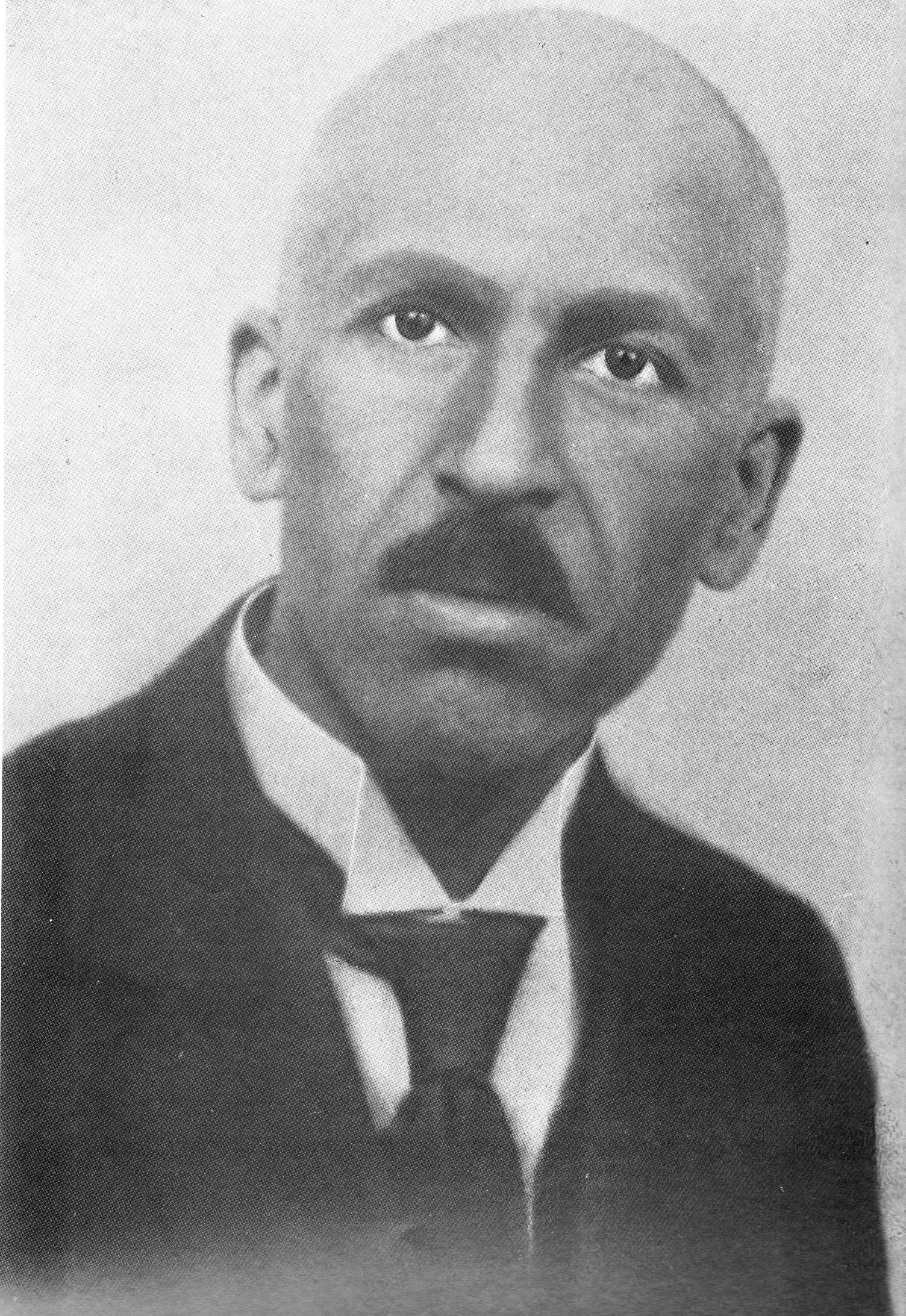
- Born: 1876; Tehran, Sublime State of Iran
- Died: 1949 (aged 72–73); Tehran, Imperial State of Iran
- Resting place: Shah Abdol-Azim Shrine, Tehran, Iran

Mohammad Qazvini (Persian: محمد قزوینی, romanized: Moḥammad Qazvīnī; 1876–1949) was a prominent figure in modern Iranian culture and literature.

== Education and activities ==
Qazvini was born in Tehran. He studied at literary and philosophical seminaries, studying culture, jurisprudence, principles, theology, ancient wisdom and gained knowledge of the various branches of Arabic literature.

His brother, Mirza Ahmad Khan, invited the 28-year-old Qazvini to London. Orientalist Edward Granville Browne was familiar and interested in Qazvini's research and expertise and met him at the University of Cambridge. Qazvini remained in Europe for almost thirty five years.

== Sources ==
- Milani, Abbas. "Allame Mohammad Qazvini". Eminent Persians: The Men and Women Who Made Modern Iran, 1941–1979. Vol. 2. Syracuse University Press. pp. 930–934.
