= Jahangir Tafazzoli =

Iranian journalist and politician (1914–1990)

- Born: 1914; Mashhad, Qajar Iran
- Died: 20 December 1990 (aged 75–76)
- Education: University of Tehran
- Occupation: Journalist
- Years active: 1940s–1970s

Jahangir Tafazzoli (1914–1990) was an Iranian journalist and government official during the Pahlavi period. He held various official posts and established a newspaper entitled Iran-e Ma (Persian: Our Iran). He committed suicide on 20 December 1990.

== Early life and education ==
Tafazzoli was born in Mashhad in 1914. His father was Gholamreza Mossadegh Al Sultan. After completing his primary education, he graduated from Ferdowsi High School in Mashhad and received a bachelor's degree in literature from the University of Tehran.

== Career and activities ==
Tafazzoli started his career as a teacher at Iranshahr High School in Yazd. He joined the Tudeh Party and was a representative of its youth organization. He launched and edited a newspaper, Iran-e Ma, in Tehran which was first published on 11 June 1943. Through his paper Tafazzoli laid basis of his political career, but also he was arrested and detained during World War II due to his activities in the paper based on the allegations that he and others related to the paper were collaborating with the Nazis.

Tafazzoli was close to Ashraf Pahlavi and Abdolhossein Hazhir and was trusted by the Shah Mohammad Reza Pahlavi. During the premiership of Abdolhossein Hazhir he briefly served as the deputy prime minister. From 1954 to 1960 Tafazzoli was the Iranian official responsible for the Iranian university students in Europe. He was also named as the representative of Iran at UNESCO which he held until 1960.

Tafazzoli was appointed minister without portfolio and the head of press and broadcasting department in the cabinet led by Prime Minister Asadollah Alam in 1962. He was reappointed minister of state on 19 February 1963 when Alam formed his second cabinet and remained in office until the end of the cabinet term in March 1964. During this period Tafazzoli was a member of the Majlis in the 18th term representing Birjand for the People's Party led by Asadollah Alam. Tafazzoli was named by Alam as a member of the board of directors of the export bank, Bank Saderat.

Tafazzoli was the ambassador of Iran to Algeria between 1969 and 1970. Tafazzoli was appointed ambassador of Iran to Afghanistan in 1971 and held the post until 1974. He wrote the text of the Shah's public speech delivered in Qom on 25 February 1972.

== Death, legacy and awards ==
Tafazzoli committed suicide on 20 December 1990. Yaghoub Tavakoli published the diaries of Jahangir Tafazzoli in 1997. Tafazzoli was the recipient of the Homayoun First Class Medal which was awarded to him in 1963.
