= Ismail Riahi =

Iranian military officer and politician

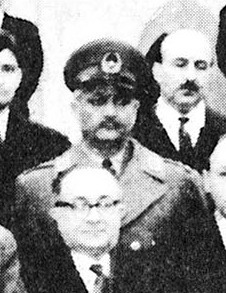

Minister of Agriculture
- In office 12 March 1963 – 31 October 1968
- Prime Minister: Asadollah Alam; Hassan Ali Mansur; Amir Abbas Hoveida
- Preceded by: Hasan Arsanjani
- Succeeded by: Hassan Zahedi

Personal details
- Born: 1907 Tehran, Qajar Iran
- Died: 13 August 2000 (aged 92–93) Paris, France
- Occupation: Military; Politician

Military service
- Allegiance: Imperial State of Iran
- Branch/service: Imperial Iranian Army
- Rank: Lieutenant general

Ismail Riahi (1907–2000) was an Iranian military officer, who also served as minister of agriculture. Part of one of the most famous Chaleshtar families, his elder brother, Colonel Dr. Mohammad Riahi, was the president of the University of Isfahan, who devoted all his personal land to the expansion of the university. His other brother was Ibrahim, the Minister of Health in the second Pahlavi era. Ismail went through the military step by step and in 1960 he became a lieutenant general in the army and then deputy chief of staff of the army.

== Family life ==
He married Nosrat Vakili, had four children (one of them died at the age of one), six grand-children and seven great-grand children, all of them (except his dead child) alive to this date.

His wife is now ninety-nine years old, living in Paris. His only son, Ghobad, lives in Pennsylvania, his two children Sepand and Negin also live in the US. Negin has two children, named Max and Leila, who are now adults. Ismail's oldest daughter, Roshan, had two children named Roxaneh and Darius. Darius has two children named Nora and Alexander, and he lives with them in Canada. Roxaneh lives in Paris. Ismail's youngest daughter, Sousan, has two children, Naz and Nassim. Naz has a child named Dara, and they live in Connecticut. Nassim has two children named Ava and Zacharie, and they live in Nairobi. Ismail is buried in the Montparnasse cemetery, in Paris.

== Ministerial period ==
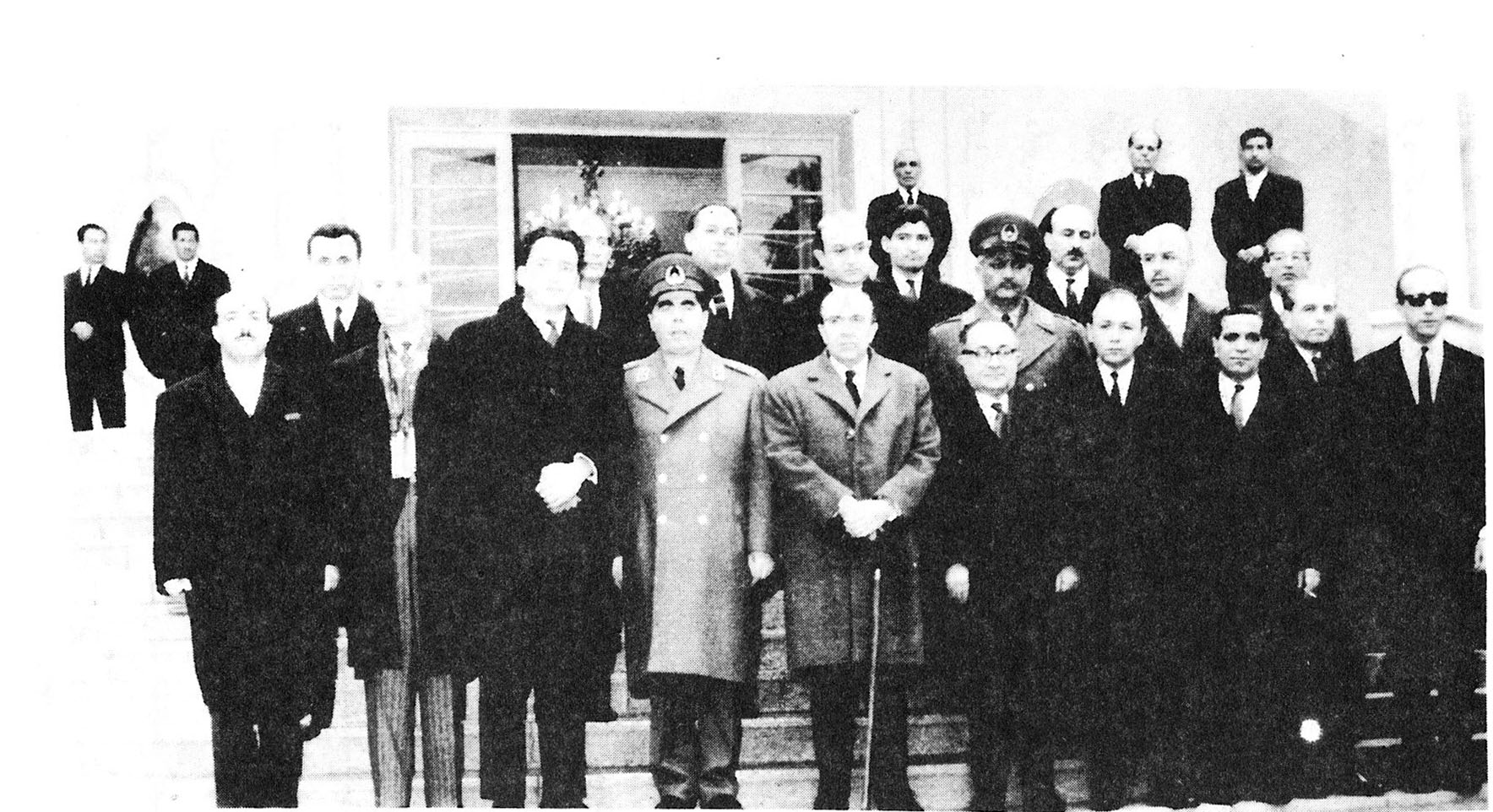
First Cabinet Prime Minister Amir Abbas Hoveyda, with General Ismaïl Riahi.

During his ministerial period, the land reform that had begun before him continued. During his time as Minister, the White Revolution took place, one of the foundations of which was land reform.

With his departure from the Ministry of Agriculture, the ministry was transformed into the Ministry of Agriculture, Agricultural Production and Natural Resources (apparently in the second cabinet), and a series of changes were made to the minister's authority.

== After the ministerial period ==
From 1971 to 1978, he was the head of the Southern Fisheries Department.
