= Hasan Arsanjani =

Iranian politician (1922–1969)

- حسن ارسنجانی
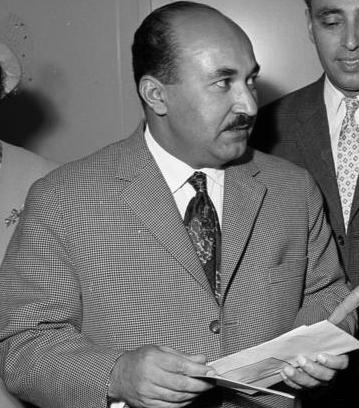
- Hasan Arsanjani at Hotel Königshof Bonn in June 1961

Minister of Agriculture
- In office 5 May 1961 – 9 March 1963
- Prime Minister: Ali Amini; Asadollah Alam

Personal details
- Born: 1922
- Died: 1969 (aged 46–47)
- Party: National Front (1949–1952); Democrat Party (1946–1948)

Hassan Arsanjani (Persian: حسن ارسنجانی; 1922–1969) was an Iranian politician. A radical reformer, as the minister of agriculture in the cabinet of Ali Amini, he introduced the program of land reform in Iran. Later on, the Shah, Mohammad Reza Pahlavi, forced him to resign and credited himself for introducing the land reform through his White Revolution. He was a law graduate who held several positions including publisher of the Darya newspaper, member of the Parliament during the Majlis's fifteenth assembly, political deputy of Ahmad Qavam and agricultural minister in the cabinets of both Ali Amini and Asadollah Alam. His death in suspicious circumstances was attributed to the fact that he had become immensely popular especially among peasants after the land reform, something that was not appreciated by the SAVAK, the Shah's secret police.

In the early 1960s, fearing widespread revolution in Iran, the administration of U.S. President John F. Kennedy urged the reluctant shah to undertake socio-economic reforms. The US approved cabinet of Amini rose to the occasion and implemented an ambitious agrarian reform law which was the brainchild of the populist Arsanjani. As the minister of agriculture, he ordered a fresh topographic survey of government-owned lands, in order to parcel them out to landless peasants. At the time, Premier Amini warned land owners: "I do not expect slow action from you either." A long-ignored law restricting individual family holdings to 1,000 acres (4 km^{2}) of irrigated, and 2,000 acres (8 km^{2}) of nonirrigated land was dusted off and declared operative. Arsanjani's program permitted landlords to own only one village and its farm lands and buildings; their other holdings must have been sold to the government at specified prices for distribution to sharecropping farmers. Arsanjani declared: "First we will tackle those who own 150 villages and whose only talent is for drink and drugs and for beating and torturing peasants."

Along with most of the other 450 wealthy families, the landlords of Fars fought the land distribution law by helping to foment street riots in Tehran, falsifying ownership records with the connivance of provincial officials, forging ballots in local elections. The landlords won powerful allies by enlisting mullahs who were using their pulpits to frighten illiterate, landless peasants out of demanding their legal rights. They hired assassins to murder a young land-reform agent, and turned an angry nation against them.

Malek Abedi, 32, lived in the provincial capital of Shiraz with his wife and an eight-year-old son. While he was being driven home in a Jeep with two other land-reform officials, a band of 15 or 20 masked, armed horsemen stopped the car near town and ordered the occupants to get out. "Abedi was the first one out." recalled the driver, "and they immediately cut him down with shotgun and rifle fire." Without harming the other two officials, the killers fled. The government, convinced that the landlords were responsible for the deed, moved swiftly. Army planes flew low over the hills of Fars, stronghold of the fierce Qashqai tribe, to try to spot the killers. Under martial law, a military governor took over control from civilian officials who, it was rumored, had plotted with landlords to oppose reform. A national day of mourning was declared for Abedi, and the Teheran radio broadcast only news and funeral music. Instead of halting land reform in the area, the murder had the opposite effect. Agriculture Minister Hasan Arsanjani, who has aggressively pushed the cause of land reform under two Premiers, ordered local officials to finish the job in Fars within 45 days.

While Arsanjani's program failed to radically advance the economic situation, it succeeded in politicizing the peasantry, who began demanding changes in their own self-interest. Although both Arsanjani and Amini were officially used as scapegoats by the Shah, Arsanjani's successes increased his popularity among the populace, and he resigned his position in 1963. Both Arsanjani and Amini were halted in their efforts by the Shah and his supporters in the traditional classes. Amini was labelled a traitor to his class by traditional landlords and the bureaucratic elite who saw their positions threatened by the reform programs and anti-corruption drives. Arsanjani during his official responsibilities over White Revolution have had given legal proposal to Shah of Iran to order all lands be returned to original owners for agriculture production therefore, farmers could have interests and profits in the time of harvest sell by given some percentage of total revenue.

Following his dismissal from the office while serving in the second cabinet of Asadollah Alam, Arsanjani was appointed Iranian ambassador to Italy which he held between June 1963 and late 1964.
