= Hassan Akhavi =

Iranian politician and military officer (1908–1997)

- حسن اخوی
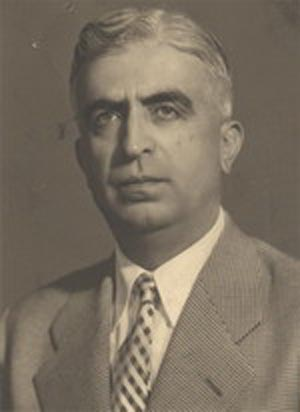

Minister of Agriculture
- In office 4 April 1957 – November 1959
- Monarch: Mohammad Reza Pahlavi
- Prime Minister: Manouchehr Eghbal
- Preceded by: Khalil Taleghani
- Succeeded by: Jamshid Amouzegar

Director of the Second Bureau
- In office ?–1945
- Preceded by: Habibullah Deyhimi
- Succeeded by: Colonel Saqafi

Personal details
- Born: Mohammad Hassan Akhavi; 1908 Tehran, Qajar Iran
- Died: 17 April 1997 (aged 88–89) Orange County, California, United States
- Party: Aria Party
- Education: Iranian Military Academy

Military service
- Allegiance: Pahlavi Iran
- Branch/service: Imperial Iranian Army
- Years of service: 1930–1958
- Rank: Major general

Hassan Akhavi (1908–17 April 1997) was an Iranian military officer who played an active role in the overthrown of Prime Minister Mohammad Mosaddegh in 1953. He briefly served as the minister of agriculture in the period 1957–1959 and retired from military offices and politics. Following the regime change in Iran in 1979 he settled in the United States.

== Biography ==
Akhavi was born in Tehran in 1908. Following his graduation from the officer's college he joined the Imperial Iranian Army. He held various military posts, including chief of staff in Khuzestan. In the 1940s, he was a member of the Aria Party led by Hasan Arfa. Akhavi was the leader of its military wing.

Hossein Fardoust in his memoirs published in 1978 argued that Akhavi was one of the major liaisons between the Shah Mohammad Reza Pahlavi and army officers who were planning a coup against the government of Prime Minister Mohammad Mosaddegh in 1953. During this period Akhavi's military rank was colonel, and he was heading the military intelligence unit of the army. He was part of the pro-British group among the coup planning army officers. The major members of Akhavi's group were the following: General Hassan Arfa, Brigadier General Teymur Bakhtiar and Colonel Hedayatollah Gilanshah. On 15 August 1953 Akhavi was among the coup supporters who were arrested by the forces loyal to Mosaddegh.

After the success of the coup Akhavi was promoted to the rank of brigadier general and became the deputy chief of staff of the army. In this post he served as one of the deputies of Nader Batmanghelidj, army's chief of staff.

Then Akhavi served as a military attaché in Turkey, Greece and Yugoslavia for a short term. In 1956 he returned to Iran and became the head of the Forestry Organization and the commander of the Forest Guard. Akhavi was appointed minister of agriculture in the cabinet led by Prime Minister Manouchehr Eghbal on 4 April 1957. He was also promoted to the rank of major general the same year. Akhavi was removed from the office due to his opposition to the land reform plan in 1959. Jamshid Amouzegar replaced him as minister of agriculture.

After his removal Akhavi retired from both politics and army. He left Iran for the United States after the end of the Pahlavi rule in 1979. He died of natural causes in Orange County, California, on 17 April 1997.
