= Musa Nuri Esfandiari =

Iranian diplomat (1894–1972)

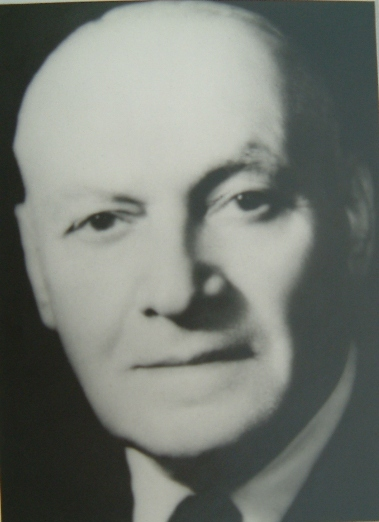
Musa Nuri Esfandiari

Musa Nuri Esfandiari (Persian: موسی نوری اسفندیاری; 1894 – 1972), titled Movaffagh os-Saltaneh (Persian: موفق‌السلطنه), was an Iranian diplomat and served as foreign minister and as ambassador during the Pahlavi era. He also used the name Musa Khan Mofaq ol-Saltaneh.

== Early life and education ==
Esfandiari was born in 1894, in Tehran, Qajar Iran (now Iran). He was from the noble Persian Esfandiari Noor family and had a brother, Asadullah Yamin Esfandiari who worked as a diplomat.

Esfandiari was educated both in Iran and in Europe.

== Career ==
After his graduation Esfandiari joined the Ministry of Foreign Affairs in 1916. After serving at different diplomatic missions he was named as the counsellor and charge d’affaires of the Imperial Iran in France in 1933. In December of the same year he was appointed counsellor in the Soviet Union which held for a short period. Then he was appointed charge d’affaires of the Imperial Iran in Turkey. He was named as the director-general of industry and mines in July 1937. He served as the Ambassador of the Imperial Iran to Iraq between December 1937 and August 1938.

In 1939 Esfandiari was sent to Nazi Germany where he remained until 1941. Upon his return to Iran Esfandiari was again appointed Ambassador to Iraq. He was named as the Ambassador to Turkey in 1945.

On 15 June 1948 he was appointed minister of foreign affairs to the cabinet led by Prime Minister Abdolhossein Hazhir. He was in office until November that year. During the premiership of Manouchehr Eghbal between 1957 and 1960 Esfandiari served as the Ambassador of Iran to Japan.

== Personal life and death ==
Esfandiari was married and had a son. He was fluent in French and Italian. He died in 1972.
