= Hedayatollah Gilanshah =

Imperial Iran's air force commander (1907–1986)

Timsar Hedayatollah Gilanshah
- هدایت‌الله گیلانشاه
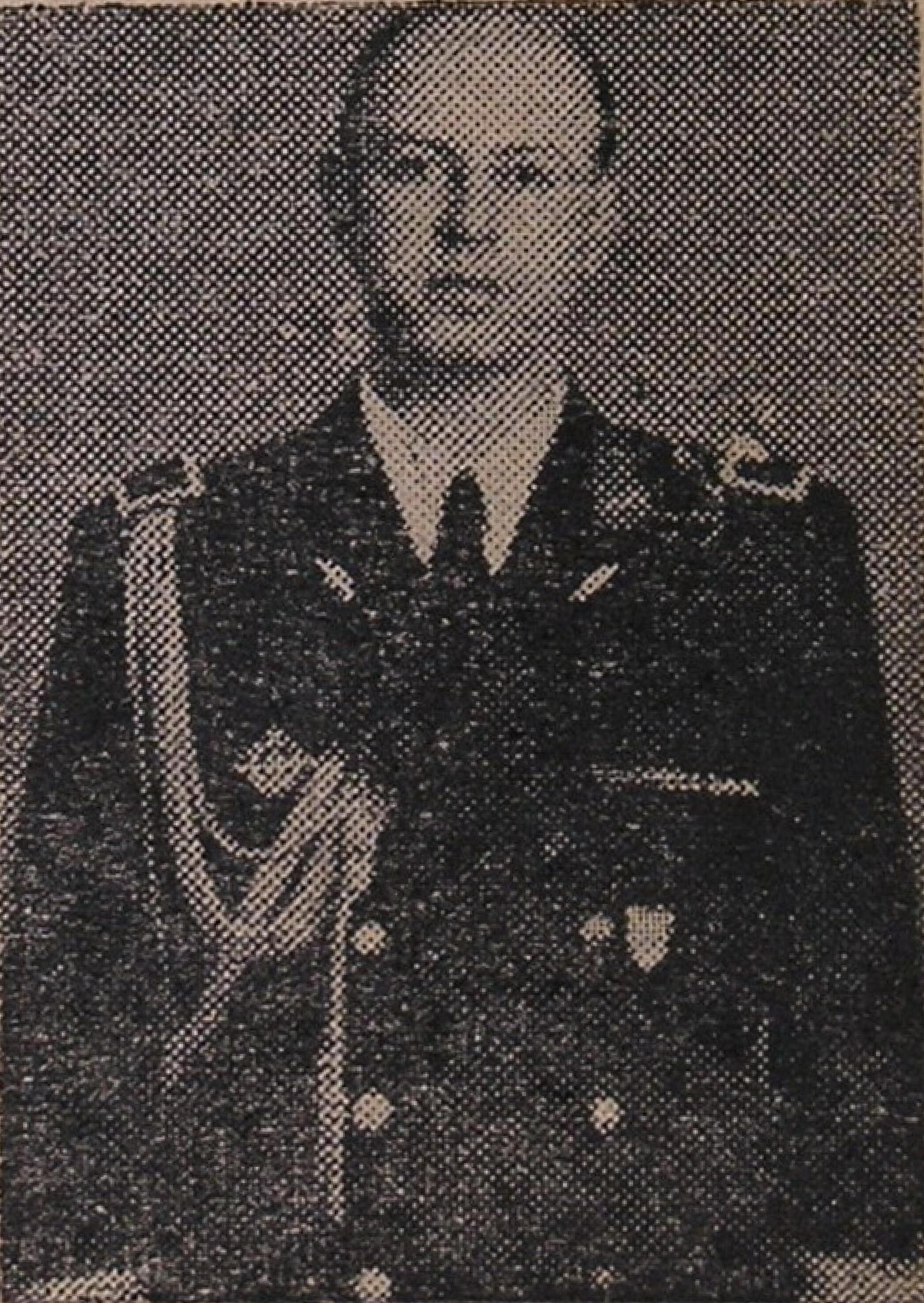
- Gilanshah in 1954

Commander of the Imperial Iranian Air Force
- In office 20 March 1954 – 7 October 1958
- Monarch: Mohammad Reza Pahlavi
- Prime Minister: Fazlollah Zahedi; Hossein Ala'; Manouchehr Eghbal
- Preceded by: Mohammad Moeini
- Succeeded by: Mohammad Amir Khatami
- In office 5 February 1952 – 3 March 1953
- Monarch: Mohammad Reza Pahlavi
- Prime Minister: Mohammad Mosaddegh; Ahmad Qavam; Mohammad Mosaddegh
- Preceded by: Mehdi Sepahpour
- Succeeded by: Mohammad Moeini
- In office 8 September 1947 – 30 March 1948
- Monarch: Mohammad Reza Pahlavi
- Prime Minister: Ahmad Qavam; Ebrahim Hakimi
- Preceded by: Mohammad-Hossein Amidi
- Succeeded by: Mir-Mohammad Mohanna

General Adjutant to the Shah
- In office 1953–1954
- Monarch: Mohammad Reza Pahlavi
- Prime Minister: Fazlollah Zahedi

President of the Iranian Football Association
- In office 20 June 1950 – November/December 1952
- Preceded by: Ali Kani
- Succeeded by: Mohsen Haddad

Personal details
- Born: 1907 Tehran, Sublime State of Persia
- Died: 1986 (aged 78–79) Tehran, Islamic Republic of Iran
- Education: Officers’ Academy

Military service
- Allegiance: Pahlavi Iran
- Branch/service: Imperial Iranian Air Force
- Years of service: 1930s–1958
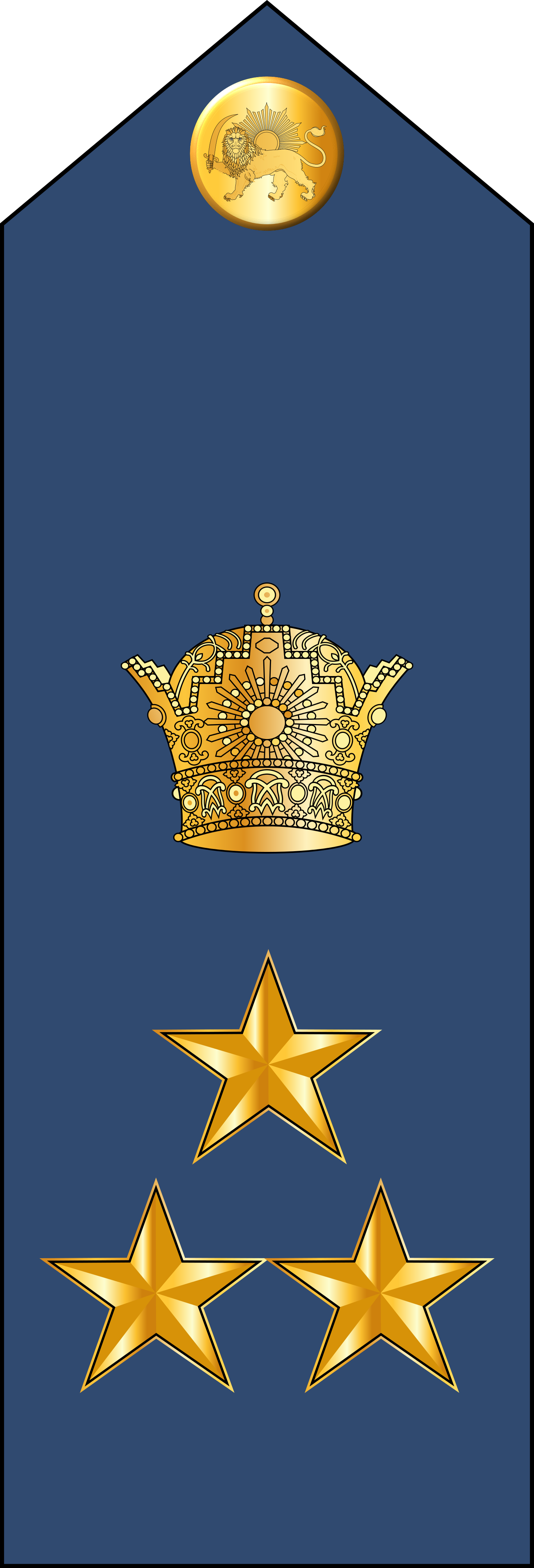
- Rank: Lieutenant General
- Commands: Khuzestan Air Regiment (1941–?)
- Battles/wars: 1953 Iranian coup d'état

Hedayatollah Gilanshah (1907–1986) was the commander of the Imperial Iranian Air Force for three terms. He was among the individuals who contributed to the development of the Iranian air force. In addition, he was one of the army officers who played an active in the coup against Prime Minister Mohammad Mosaddegh in 1953.

== Early life and education ==
Gilanshah was born in Tehran in 1907. He hailed from an aristocratic family. He graduated from the Officers’ Academy in Tehran. He was trained as a pilot in England and France. He joined further training programmes in England and the US.

== Career and activities ==
In September 1941, he served as the commander of the Khuzestan Air Regiment. In 1947, he was promoted to the rank of Brigadier General and commander of the Air force from 1947 to 1948.

Between 1950 and 1952 Gilanshah served as the head of the Iranian Soccer Association. In 1952 he was appointed as the commander of the Iranian Air Force. He blamed Prime Minister Mohammad Mosaddegh for his early retirement and joined the anti-Mosaddeq officers. He was part of the pro-British army officers who were planning a coup against the government of Mosaddegh. The major members of this group included General Hassan Arfa, Brigadier General Teymur Bakhtiar and Colonel Hassan Akhavi. Gilanshah was promoted to the rank of Major General after the coup which had removed Mosaddegh from office and was named as the chief of the Shah Mohammad Reza Pahlavi's military office. From 1954 to 1958 he was the commander of the Iranian Air Force. Hedayatollah Gilanshah was regarded as one of the most powerful military figures of the second Pahlavi era.

== Later years and death ==
After leaving office he retired and died in 1986.
