= Government of Abdolhossein Hazhir =

Imperial Iran's government between June and November 1948

- 30th Cabinet of Pahlavi Iran

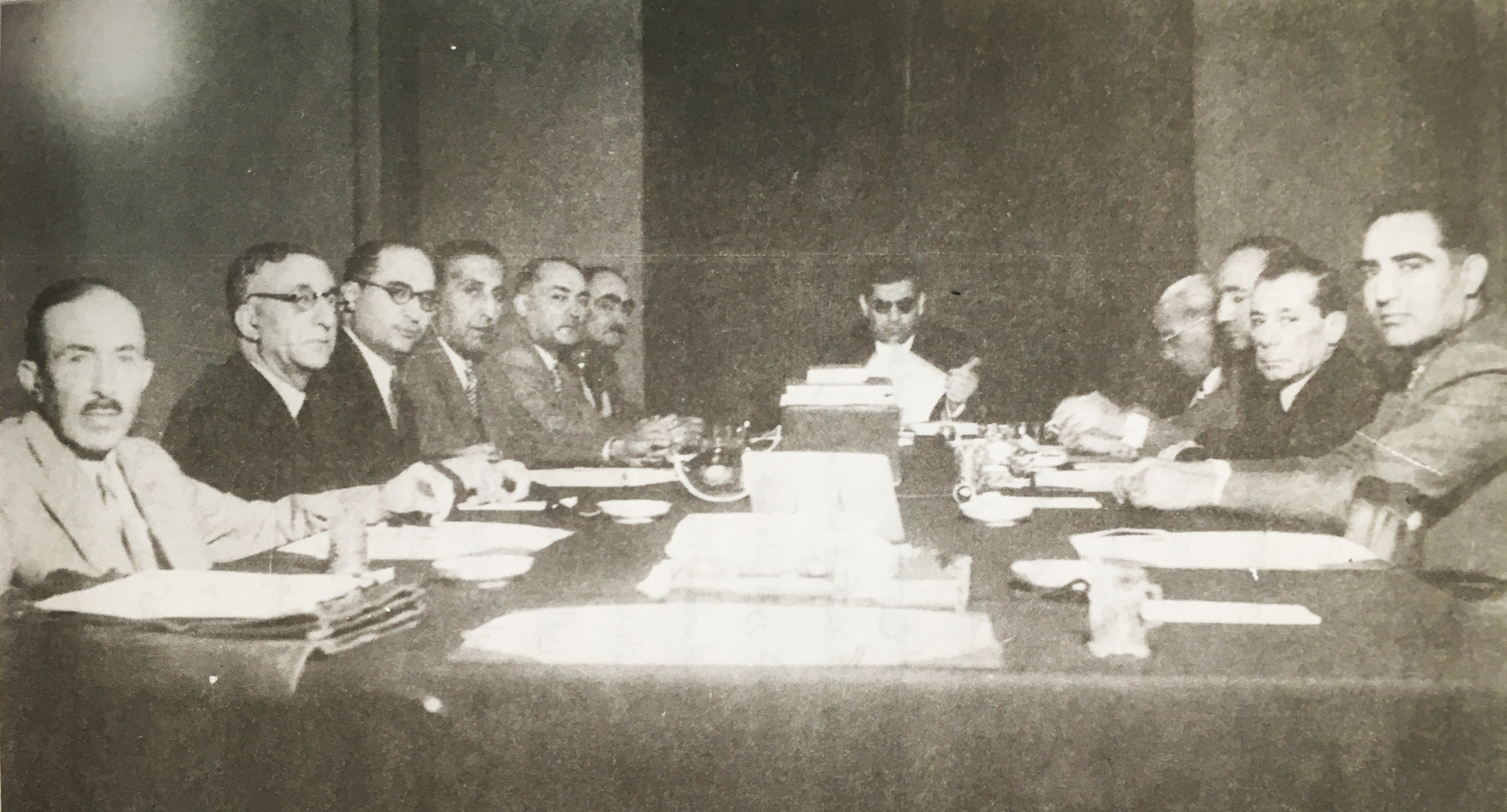
- Cabinet members
- Date formed: 15 June 1948
- Date dissolved: 6 November 1948

People and organisations
- Head of state: Mohammad Reza Pahlavi
- Head of government: Abdolhossein Hazhir
- No. of ministers: 12

History
- Advice and consent: 29 June 1948; 23 August 1948
- Predecessor: Government of Ebrahim Hakimi
- Successor: Government of Mohammad Sa'ed

The government led by Prime Minister Abdolhossein Hazhir was formed on 15 June 1948 and replaced the cabinet of Ebrahim Hakimi. It is one of the short-lived cabinets in the Pahlavi Iran and was dissolved on 6 November 1948 when the Prime Minister Hazhir resigned from office. Mohammad Sa'ed formed the next cabinet.

== Background ==
Premiership of Abdolhossein Hazhir was approved by 66 deputies out of 120 Parliament members on 13 June 1948. It was protested by religious figures, including Abol-Ghasem Kashani. Despite these protests the cabinet received a vote of confidence from the Parliament on 29 June 1948. Due to the ongoing protests Hazhir demanded a second parliamentarian vote of confidence which was granted on 23 August. However, the cabinet had to resign on 6 November because of the continuing mass protests.

== List of ministers ==
On 15 June 1948 when the cabinet was announced, it was reported that appointments to the ministry of roads and to the ministry of agriculture would be declared later. The members of the cabinet were as follows:

Portfolio	Minister	Took office	Left office	Party
Prime Minister	Abdolhossein Hazhir	15 June 1948	6 November 1948	
Minister of War	Amir Ahmadi	15 June 1948	6 November 1948	Military
Minister of Foreign Affairs	Musa Nuri Esfandiari	15 June 1948	6 November 1948	
Minister of Interior	Khalil Fahimi	15 June 1948	6 November 1948	
Minister of Justice	Nazem Mafi	15 June 1948	6 November 1948	
Minister of Finance	Amanullah Ardalan	15 June 1948	6 November 1948	
Minister of Health	Abbas Adham	15 June 1948	6 November 1948	
Minister of Education	Manouchehr Eghbal	15 June 1948	6 November 1948	
Minister of National Economy	Fakhreddin Shadman	15 June 1948	6 November 1948	
Minister of Posts and Telegraph	Nader Arasteh	15 June 1948	6 November 1948	
Minister without portfolio	Mansour Adl	15 June 1948	6 November 1948	
Minister without portfolio	Jamal Imami	15 June 1948	6 November 1948	
