= Speech of Mohammad Reza Pahlavi at Pasargadae =

1971 speech by Mohammad Reza Pahlavi

- Part of 2,500-year celebration of the Persian Empire
- Front page of the newspaper Kayhan, 20 Mehr 1350 (12 October 1971); the full text of the speech is printed in a box titled "The Shahanshah's Covenant with the Founder of the Persian Empire".
- Date: 20 Mehr 1350 AP (12 October 1971)
- Time: about 11:36
- Location: Pasargadae, Fars province, Iran
- Also known as: "Cyrus, rest in peace"
- Organised by: Central Council of the Imperial Celebrations of Iran (Asadollah Alam and Abdolreza Ansari)
- Participants: Mohammad Reza Pahlavi, Farah Pahlavi, Reza Pahlavi, and civil and military officials
- Outcome: Official opening of the 2,500-year celebrations of the Persian Empire

The speech of Mohammad Reza Pahlavi at Pasargadae was a short address delivered by Mohammad Reza Pahlavi, the Shahanshah of Iran, on the morning of Tuesday, 20 Mehr 1350 AP (12 October 1971), in front of the Tomb of Cyrus the Great at Pasargadae. It formally opened the 2,500-year celebrations of the Persian Empire. Before the speech, the Shah laid a wreath on the tomb of Cyrus and observed a minute of silence; he then began his address at about 11:36.

The text was written by Shojaeddin Shafa, a figure close to the court and responsible for cultural affairs. The Shah accepted it with minor changes and, aware of its "propaganda value", rehearsed it more than his other speeches, "discovering the intonations he liked". He was deeply moved while delivering it; according to Asadollah Alam, the Minister of the Court, he was so shaken that he "had to stop for a moment" to compose himself.

The best-known part of the speech is its closing address: "Cyrus! Great King, King of Kings, Free Man of Free Men and Hero of the History of Iran and the World, rest in peace, for we are awake, and we shall always be awake." From this a shorter slogan was derived, known as "Cyrus, rest in peace" (Kurosh āsude bekhāb); but this slogan is a condensation of the speech, not the exact wording of the sentence. On its front page that same day, Kayhan itself condensed the middle sentence of the speech in a sub-headline reading "Cyrus! Rest in peace; we are awake to guard your legacy", and this condensation gradually replaced the original text in public memory.

The speech opened the official celebrations, held from 12 to 16 October 1971 at Pasargadae, Persepolis and Tehran and broadcast live on television to audiences around the world. In it Cyrus was presented as the founder of the Persian Empire; this emphasis on the pre-Islamic past, together with the closing slogan, made the speech one of the most controversial of the Pahlavi era.

== Background ==
The idea of holding a celebration to mark the 2,500th anniversary of the founding of the Persian Empire was first put to the Shah by Shojaeddin Shafa in a proposal dating to 1337–1339 AP (1958–1960); a small committee headed by Amir Homayoun, an elderly senator, was formed to study it. For nearly a decade the plan made no progress, until in 1969 a visit to Iran by Michael Stewart, the British Foreign Secretary, and his tour of Persepolis revived the Shah's interest; it was then decided that heads of state should also be invited to the celebrations.

The management of the celebrations was entrusted to a central council chaired by Asadollah Alam, the Minister of the Court, with Abdolreza Ansari among its members. To host foreign guests, the council built a camp of fully equipped tents near Persepolis. The Pasargadae ceremony was the first official event of the celebrations and was known as the "Commemoration of Cyrus". In all, sixty-two heads of state or their representatives took part in the celebrations, and fifty of them stayed in the tent city. According to one academic count, the guests included one emperor, nine kings, three reigning princes, two crown princes, thirteen presidents, ten sheikhs and two sultans.

== The Pasargadae ceremony ==
The ceremony was held on the morning of 20 Mehr 1350 AP (12 October 1971) in the precinct of the Tomb of Cyrus at Pasargadae. According to the official programme, the helicopter carrying the Shah, Farah Pahlavi and the crown prince Reza Pahlavi landed at Pasargadae at about 11:00, and the guests had taken their places beforehand. At 11:30 the Shah entered a royal tent and ten minutes later emerged, while the national anthem was played and 101 gun salutes were fired. The royal family then walked to the open ground in front of the tomb, and the Shah stepped forward, laid a wreath at the foot of the tomb and, after a minute of silence, returned. At 11:36 he began his speech, and the whole ceremony, which lasted less than an hour, ended with the royal family's departure.

Present at the ceremony were Iranian ministers and officials, representatives of religious and international bodies, Iranologists and academics, journalists and photographers, representatives of the Revolutionary Corps, and representatives of the Imperial Army. That same day, in a dated box on its front page, Kayhan wrote: "At 11:36 this morning at Pasargadae, the historic address of the Shahanshah before the tomb of Cyrus the Great". This dateline shows that the paper's printing coincided with the ceremony itself and confirms the time of 11:36 independently of the official programme.

Accounts from the time mention a whirlwind that formed on either side of the tomb while the Shah was speaking. One foreign correspondent wrote that a whirlwind of sand rushed toward the Shah, but when he raised his head and spoke, it retreated to a "respectful distance". Peter Chelkowski, the Iranologist, also said years later that as the Shah addressed Cyrus, a column of dust swirled on both sides of the tomb. These accounts repeat what witnesses said; they are not an established event.

== Text of the speech ==
The speech is short and was printed in full on the front page of Kayhan on the day of the ceremony, in a box titled "The Shahanshah's Covenant with the Founder of the Persian Empire", under the headline "The Shahanshah's Oath at Pasargadae". As with the other speeches of the celebrations, its author was Shoja-eddin Shafa, and the Shah accepted it with minor amendments.

The speech begins with a salutation to Cyrus:

"Cyrus! Great King, King of Kings, Achaemenid King, King of the land of Iran, from me, the Shahanshah of Iran, and from my nation, greetings to you."

In the middle section, the Shah tells Cyrus that Iranians have gathered to say that they are awake:

"Cyrus! Today we have gathered before your eternal resting place to tell you: rest in peace, for we are awake, and to guard your glorious legacy we shall always be awake."

Three successive vows then follow: to keep flying the banner that Cyrus raised; to preserve the greatness and honour of this land "with a will of steel"; and to uphold the tradition of humanitarianism and good thought that Cyrus made the foundation of the Persian Empire. The speech ends with the following closing address:

"Cyrus! Great King, King of Kings, Free Man of Free Men and Hero of the History of Iran and the World, rest in peace, for we are awake and we shall always be awake."

In both places where "rest in peace" appears in the printed text, it is accompanied by "for we are awake". An audio recording of the speech is kept in the official archive of Farah Pahlavi.

== "Cyrus, rest in peace" ==
The slogan "Cyrus, rest in peace" is one of the best-known slogans of the Pahlavi era and after, but it is not the exact wording of a sentence in the speech. The closing sentence of the speech has the long form given above ("Free Man of Free Men and Hero of the History of Iran and the World, rest in peace, for we are awake and we shall always be awake"), and the middle sentence also contains "to guard your glorious legacy". The short slogan condenses these two sentences and also drops "for".

The earliest printed form of this condensation is Kayhan's own sub-headline on the front page of 20 Mehr 1350: "Cyrus! Rest in peace; to guard your legacy, we are awake". Later, in popular speech, the slogan became "Cyrus, rest in peace, for we are awake" and circulated as a quotation from the speech; in 1400 AP (2021–22), for example, Kayhan republished it as the "famous address". Abolhassan Banisadr, too, in the documentary Decline and Fall: The Shah's Great Party, called the same short slogan the Shah's "famous sentence".

== Reception and criticism ==
The 2,500-year celebration of the Persian Empire had implications beyond the political objectives of the Pahlavi government, particularly in the fields of diplomacy, culture, historical research, and tourism. The attendance of numerous monarchs, presidents, and senior foreign officials at the October 1971 ceremonies provided an opportunity to expand Iran's diplomatic relations and increase its international visibility. In their study of the international reception of the celebrations, Hassan Zandieh and Ali Ghanavati concluded that the participation of foreign leaders contributed to strengthening Mohammad Reza Pahlavi's international standing.

Another consequence of the event was the expansion of cultural and academic activities related to Iranian history and civilization internationally. According to Robert Steele, the celebrations provided an impetus for a range of academic and cultural initiatives in different countries, including cooperation between universities and research institutions, the publication of scholarly works, and programs related to Iranian studies. Steele examines these activities as an important cultural dimension of the celebrations and their longer-term legacy.

The celebrations and the large number of foreign visitors also increased international media and public attention to Iran's historical monuments, particularly Persepolis and Pasargadae. Steele's research examines the event's relationship with the development of tourism in Iran and the government's efforts to present the country's historical heritage to international audiences.

The ceremony and the speech were covered by the world media from the same day; the speech was broadcast live, and the Shah was aware that he was speaking not only to a domestic audience but to the world. Kayhan International, Kayhan's English-language paper, published a translation of the text. Even so, what entered public debate more than the content of the speech was the cost of the celebrations.

The cost of the celebrations was hotly disputed. On 2 Aban 1350 AP (24 October 1971), Asadollah Alam announced an official cost of 16.8 million dollars at a press conference. Abdolreza Ansari, an organiser of the celebrations, put the cost at 160 million tomans, close to 22 million dollars at the time. By contrast, Time magazine put it at 100 million dollars, and Abolhassan Banisadr, based on what he had heard, estimated 650 million dollars. Abbas Milani has described both figures, Ansari's 22 million dollars and Banisadr's 650 million dollars, as guesses. The difference between these figures arises because some count only the cost of hospitality and of holding several days of ceremonies, while others also add infrastructure costs for roads and security.

Another part of the reaction was mockery. In one joke popular at the time, a man reads the news of the speech, hurries home, finds his wife in bed with a neighbour named Cyrus, and says, "Cyrus, rest in peace, for we are awake". Protest slogans were also made from the line, including "Rest in peace, for we are squandering the oil". Others, alluding to the Shah's policies, turned it into "Rest in peace, we are ruining the country".

Religious opponents, above all Ruhollah Khomeini in exile in Najaf, condemned the celebrations and the tone of the speech. Khomeini paid less attention in his speech to the cost of the celebrations and the tents at Persepolis, and concentrated more on the ceremony's pre-Islamic framing and on the reported presence of Israeli experts in preparing it; he said that "experts from Israel have been invited for the preparations" and called Israel "the sworn enemy of Islam and the Quran". The pre-Islamic framework, which presented Cyrus as the founder of Iran and not as an Islamic figure, was the core of his objection. In a declaration dated 31 October 1971 titled "The Incompatibility of Monarchy with Islam", Khomeini also called the celebrations futile and asked whether the people's wealth should be spent on such festivities.

The Shah himself defended the celebrations in later years; in response to an interviewer's praise of the speech he said: "I am grateful for this tribute, but I do not deserve it. Nevertheless, there is no need for me to assure you that we are awake and will always remain awake to guard Iran's precious heritage." Even so, according to an account by one of his associates, the Shah later expressed regret over the celebrations' dependence on foreign services, saying "they drew us down this path ... we should not have let it happen".

Institutions of the Islamic Republic have called the celebrations "the banquet of Ahriman"; this phrase is also the title of a four-volume collection of official documents about the celebrations.

== Legacy ==
After the islamic revolution in 1979, a group of revolutionaries tried to destroy Persepolis as a symbol of "satanic monarchy", but villagers and Qashqai tribespeople living nearby saved the site from destruction. In later years the pre-Islamic past, and especially the commemoration of Cyrus, became a ground of protest; the gathering on Cyrus Day, 7 Aban (29 October), beside his tomb at Pasargadae, has repeatedly been restricted by the islamic republic authorities and the roads leading to it closed.

The slogan also went beyond the speech and acquired political reuse: in 1400 AP (2021) a documentary of the same name ("Rest in Peace, Cyrus"), made by Ali Farahani-Sadr, about the separation of Bahrain from Iran, was released, and some described its title as a political jab at Mohammad Reza Pahlavi, although the documentary itself stressed the Shah's efforts to keep Bahrain.

== See also ==
- 2,500-year celebration of the Persian Empire
- Tomb of Cyrus the Great
- Cyrus the Great
