= Nader Batmanghelidj =

Iranian politician and military officer (1904–1998)

Timsar Nader Batmanghelidj
- نادر باتمانقلیچ
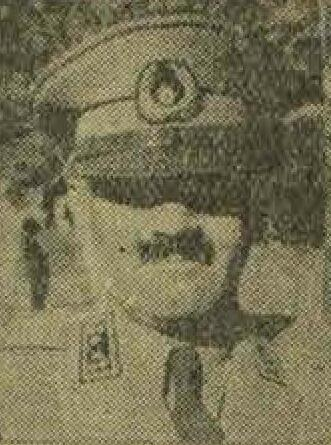
- Batmanghelidj in 1953

Governor of Khorasan province amd Custodian of Astan Quds Razavi
- In office 23 September 1965 – 22 May 1967
- Monarch: Mohammad Reza Pahlavi
- Prime Minister: Amir-Abbas Hoveyda
- Preceded by: Sadegh Amirazizi
- Succeeded by: Bagher Pirnia

Minister of Interior
- In office 10 September 1958 – 10 June 1959
- Prime Minister: Manouchehr Eghbal
- Preceded by: Fathollah Jalali
- Succeeded by: Rahmatullah Atabaki

Iranian Ambassador to Iraq
- In office 21 January 1957 – 22 September 1958
- Prime Minister: Hossein Ala'; Manouchehr Eghbal
- Preceded by: Amanullah Ardalan
- Succeeded by: Hossein Ghods-Nakhai

Iranian Ambassdor to Pakistan
- In office 24 October 1955 – 19 February 1957
- Prime Minister: Hossein Ala'
- Preceded by: Abdul Hossein Masoud Ansari
- Succeeded by: Abdol Hossein Hejazi

Chief of the Joint Staff
- In office 19 August 1953 – 23 August 1955
- Prime Minister: Fazlollah Zahedi; Hossein Ala'
- Preceded by: Taghi Riahi
- Succeeded by: Abdollah Hedayat

Director of Physical Education Organization
- In office 1952–1953
- Preceded by: Amanullah Jahanbani
- Succeeded by: Kamaloddin Jenab

Personal details
- Born: 1904 Tehran, Qajar Iran
- Died: 24 April 1998 (aged 93–94) Reston, Virginia, United States
- Spouse(s): Mahin Banu Mirfendereski (died 1974); Nayer Moluk Sadoughi
- Relations: Mehdi Batmanghelich (brother)
- Children: 3
- Education: Officers' School; War University

Military service
- Allegiance: Pahlavi Iran
- Branch/service: Ground Force
- Years of service: 1926–1967
- Rank: Lieutenant General
- Commands: 3rd Tabriz Division; Ardabil Brigade
- Battles/wars: World War II; Anglo-Soviet invasion of Iran; Iran crisis of 1946; 1953 Iranian coup d'état

Nader Batmanghelidj (Persian: نادر باتمانقلیچ; 1904 – 24 April 1998) was an Iranian military officer who served in various military and government posts. He also served as the ambassador of Pahlavi Iran to Pakistan and Iraq.

== Early life and education ==
Batmanghelidj was born in 1904. One of his brothers, Haj Mehdi Batmanghelidj, was a landowner.

He was a graduate of the Iranian Military Academy and joined the Iranian Army in the 1920s. He attended military courses in both Germany and Czechoslovakia.

== Career ==
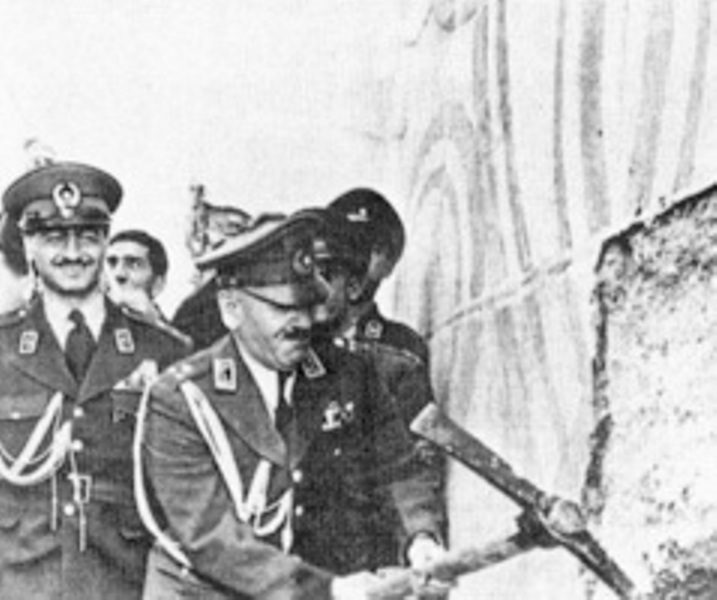
Batmanghelidj destroying part of Haziratu'l-Quds, 1955.

During the invasion of Iran by the British in World War II Batmanghelidj was serving in the army as a colonel and was captured and imprisoned by the British in 1941. He was in prison until the end of the war. Following his release Batmanghelidj became a brigadier general and participated in the liberation forces of Azerbaijan against the Soviet occupation.

Batmanghelidj was appointed head of the military office of Shah Mohammad Reza Pahlavi. He was named as the chief of the athletic program by Prime Minister Mohammad Mosaddegh. He was one of the senior military officers who were planning a coup against the Mosaddegh government. On August 15, 1953, Batmanghelidj was arrested and imprisoned when the coup failed.

When Mossadegh was overthrown in August 1953 Batmanghelidj returned to the army. He was the chief of staff of the armed forces between 1953 and 1955. Although not assigned by the government, Batmanghelidj and Teymur Bakhtiar, military-governor of Tehran, participated in the destruction of the National Baha'i Center in Tehran on 22 May 1955. They took part in the destruction of the building along with the religious leaders. Batmanghelidj became the first Iranian ambassador to Pakistan when he was appointed to the post in 1955 which he held until 1957. His appointment was possible through his closeness to retired military officer, Fazlollah Zahedi, who played a significant role in the coup d'état against Mohammad Mossadegh.

Next Batmanghelidj served as the ambassador of Iran to Iraq in the period 1957–1958. He was appointed Minister of Interior to the Cabinet led by Prime Minister Manouchehr Eghbal in 1958 and was in office until 1959. When he was in office he successfully developed a rural development plan. Batmanghelidj was succeeded by Rahmat Allah Atabaki in the post who finalized his rural development project. Batmanghelidj was the chairman of the military group of the Central Treaty Organization (CENTO) in the 1960s. His last public post was the governor general of Khorasan Province for three years in the period 1964–1967, and he retired in 1967.

== Personal life and death ==
Batmanghelidj was the owner of Tehran International Hotel which he established in the 1940s. He was arrested following the 1979 revolution in Iran. He was imprisoned for three years and went to the United States when he was released from the prison. There he first settled in Herndon, Virginia, and then in Washington DC. He married twice. His first wife, Mahin Banu Mirfendereski, died in 1974. He then married Nayer Moluk Sadoughi. He had three children from his first marriage.

Batmanghelidj died of kidney failure at the Cameron Glen Care Center in Reston, Virginia, on 24 April 1998.

=== Honors ===
Batmanghelidj was awarded the Order of Sepah and Legion of Merit both of which were from the Imperial Iran.
