= Ali-Akbar Zargham =

Iranian politician (1911–1976)

Timsar Ali-Akbar Zargham
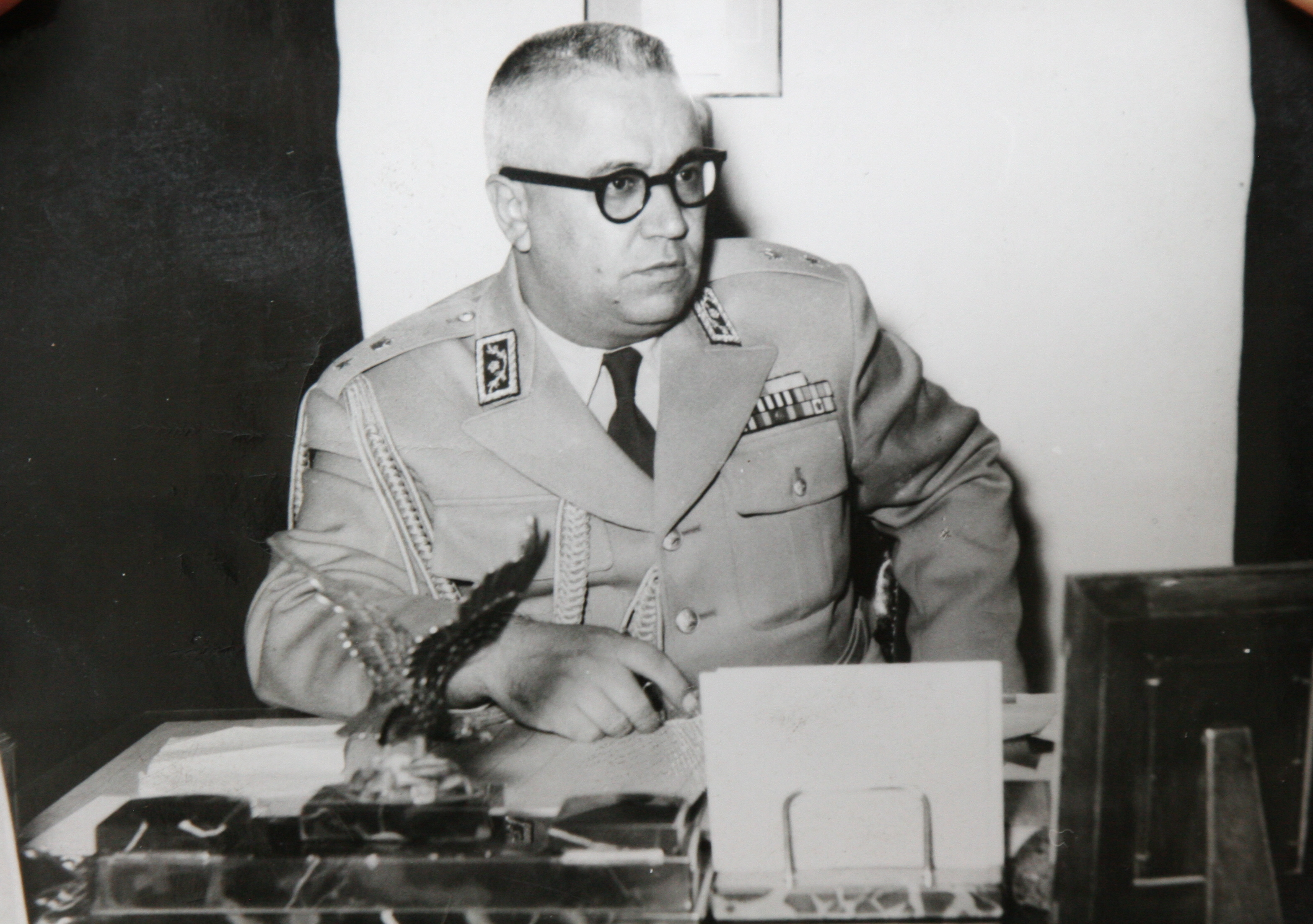

Minister of Customs
- In office 4 April 1957 – September 1960
- Monarch: Mohammad Reza Pahlavi
- Prime Minister: Manouchehr Eghbal

Personal details
- Born: 24 February 1911 Tehran, Qajar Iran
- Died: 22 December 1976 (aged 65) Tehran, Pahlavi Iran

Military service
- Branch/service: Imperial Iranian Army
- Years of service: 1930–1961
- Rank: Major General

Ali-Akbar Zargham (Persian: علی اکبر ضرغام; born 24 February 1911; died 22 December 1976) was a military officer and held several cabinet posts in the cabinets of Manouchehr Eghbal and Jafar Sharif-Emami.

== Education ==
Ali-Akbar Zargham was born in Tehran in 1911. He attended Nezam High School, which was a military high school created by Reza Shah. He graduated from the Military Academy in 1934, and eventually finished his military studies at the War University (now known as the National Defense University) in 1940. He became a major general in 1958 under Eghbal's premiership.

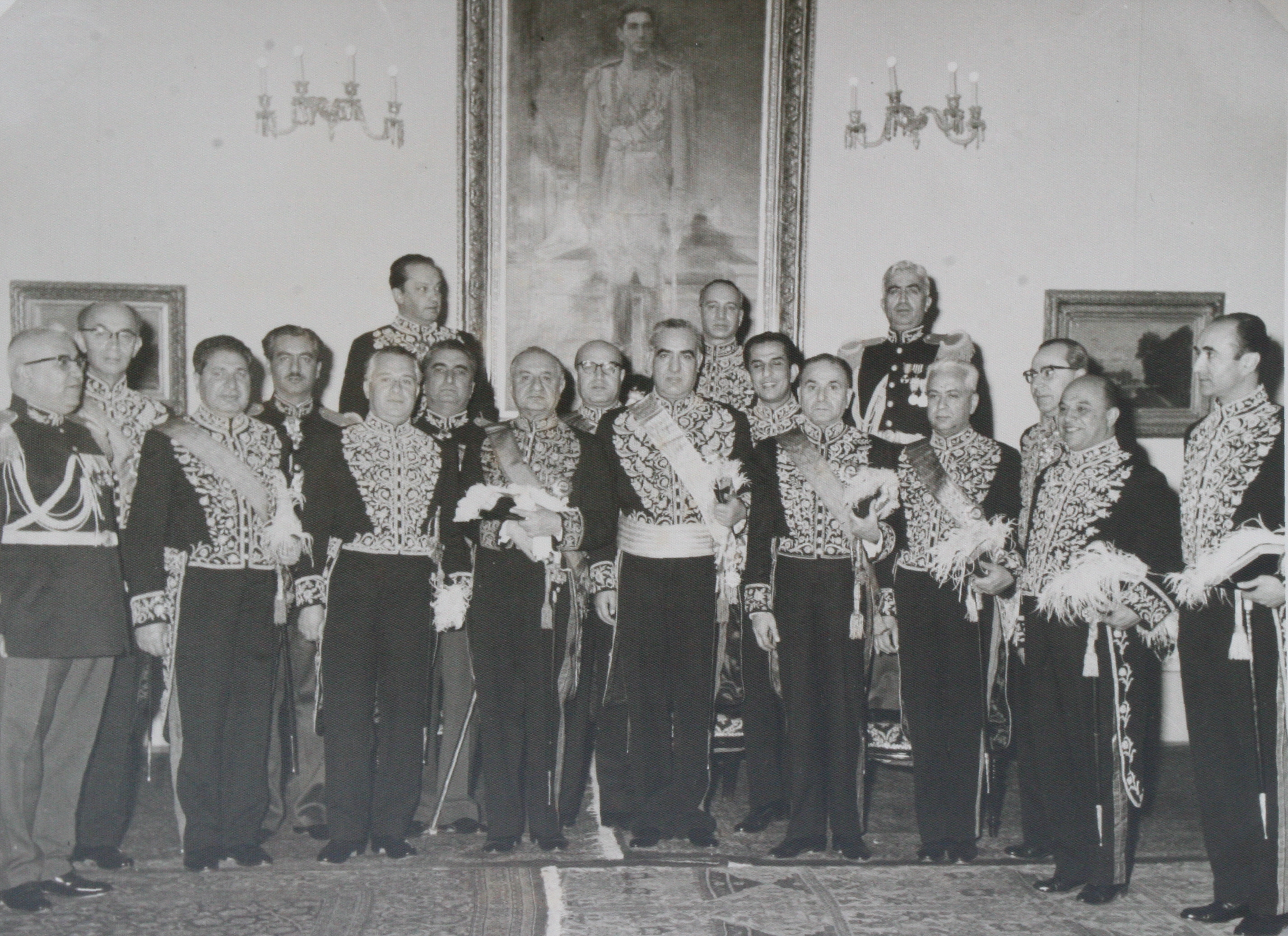
Ali-Akbar Zargham (far left), Teymur Bakhtiar (fourth from left), Manuchehr Eghbal (center), Jafar Sharif-Emami (left of Eghbal), Jamshid Amouzegar (right of Eghbal), Asadollah Alam (far right)

== Public career ==
In 1951, Zargham was assigned to the military governor's office and was appointed as the director-general of the Department of Sugar the following year. In 1955, he became the director of customs and two years later he was appointed as the first minister of customs and monopolies. On 4 April 1957, he was chosen as the customs minister under Eghbal's cabinet. He served as the finance minister in Sharif-Emami's cabinet. After his time as minister, he participated in various public services. One being his involvement in the recovery of the city of Qazvin after a devastating earthquake that occurred in 1962 (later known as the 1962 Bou'in-Zahra earthquake), killing approximately 12,000 people.

== Death ==
On 22 December 1976, Ali-Akbar Zargham died from a heart attack in his home in Tehran at the age of 65.
