= Fakhreddin Shadman =

Iranian scholar and statesman (1907–1967

- Born: Fakhreddin Shadman Valavi; 1907; Tehran, Qajar Iran
- Died: 26 August 1967 (aged 59–60); London, United Kingdom
- Title: Professor
- Spouse: Farangis Namazi
- Father: Hājj Sayyed Abu Torab

Academic background
- Education: London School of Economics and Political Science
- Thesis: The Relations of Britain and Persia, 1800-15 (1939)
- Doctoral advisor: Charles Kingsley Webster

Academic work
- Discipline: Historian
- Sub-discipline: History of Islam; History of Iran
- Institutions: University of Tehran

Fakhreddin Shadman (Persian: فخرالدین شادمان; 1907 – 26 August 1967), also known as Fakhreddin Shadman Valavi, was a leading scholar, writer and statesman of the Pahlavi era. He was a faculty member at the University of Tehran. He also held various cabinet posts in 1948 and in 1953–1954.

== Early life and education ==
Shadman was born in Tehran in 1907 into a family composed of clerics. His father, Hājj Sayyed Abu Torab, was a cleric. He was the eldest child of his parents and had five brothers and one sister.

Shadman completed his secondary education at the Darolfonun school in Tehran. He attended the Teachers Training College where he graduated in 1925 and had a degree from the School of Law in Tehran in 1927. He received a PhD in history from the London School of Economics and Political Science in 1939. Charles Kingsley Webster was his advisor, and his thesis was entitled The Relations of Britain and Persia, 1800-15.

== Career ==
Following his graduation Shadman joined the Iranian judiciary system and served as the deputy public prosecutor of Tehran. Between 1932 and 1935 he worked at the Anglo-Persian Oil Company. During his studies at the London School of Economics and Political Science he also taught Persian there and also, at the School of Oriental and African Studies. During World War II he left Britain for the United States where he worked as a visiting scholar at Harvard University.

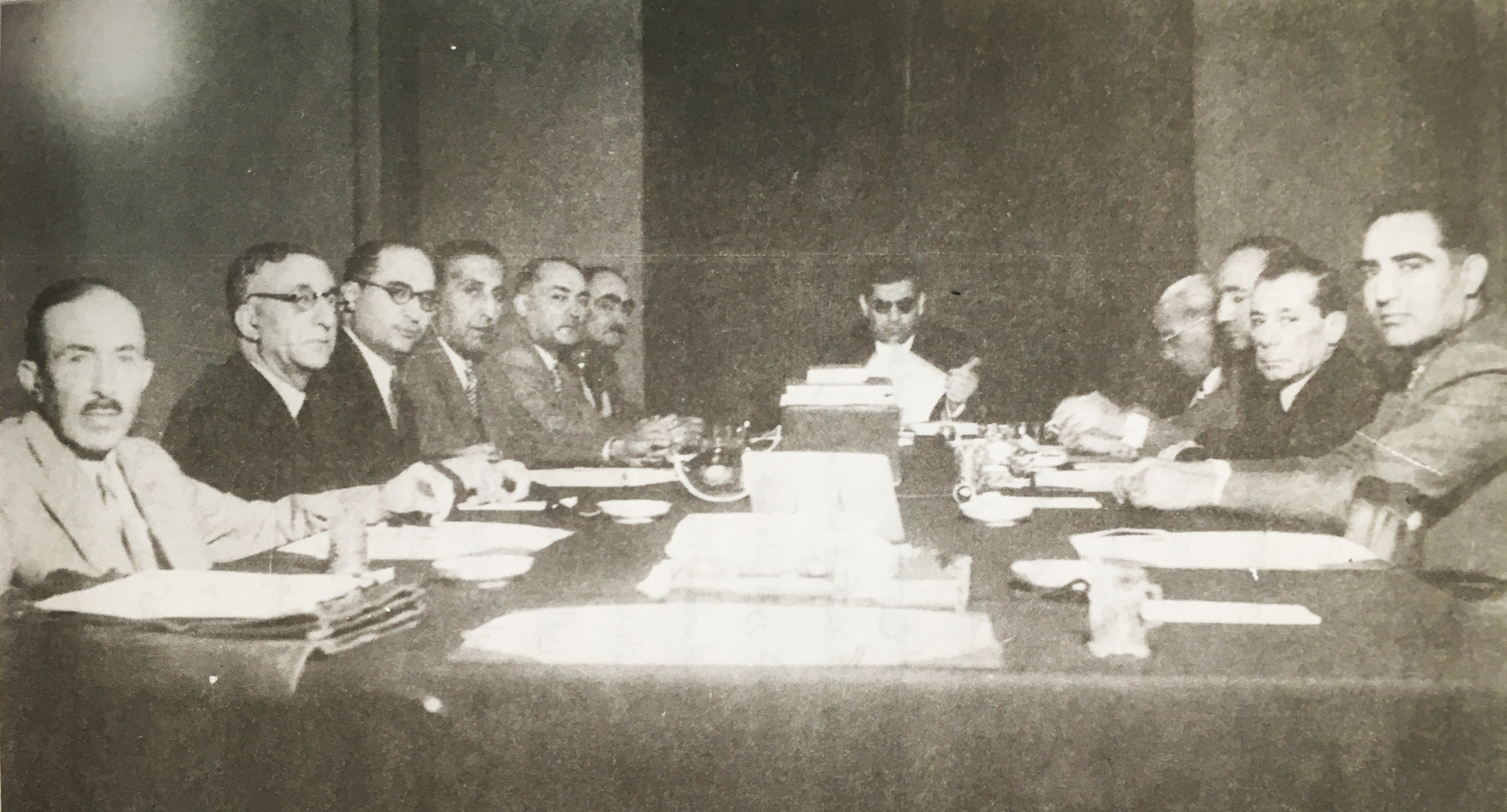
Fakhreddin Shadman in Abdul Hossein Hejir's cabinet / third from the left

He returned to Iran and began to work at various state institutions. On 15 June 1948, he was appointed minister of national economy to the cabinet led by Prime Minister Abdolhossein Hazhir. In 1950 he joined the University of Tehran where he became a professor of the history of Iran and Islam. Shadman was appointed minister of economy in 1953 and then minister of justice in 1954 to the cabinet headed by Fazlollah Zahedi. He continued to serve as minister of national economy in the next cabinet formed by Hossein Ala' in the spring of 1955 when Zahedi resigned from office. Retiring from politics Shadman taught at the University of Tehran until 1967. He was also the administrator of Imam Reza Shrine Properties, a member of the Iranian Academy and the Cultural Council of the Imperial Court of Iran and a board member of Pahlavi Library.

Shadman was one of the individuals who contributed to the establishment of the Oil College in Abadan, known as Petroleum University of Technology.

=== Views ===
Shadman was a nationalist and one of the early Iranian scholars who emphasized the negative effects of the modernization on the Iranian society. He adopted Martin Heidegger's notion that in each historical period there is a truth "which obscures competing truths." Based on this he argued that the Western-origin views should be avoided to maintain the spiritual origins and political unity of Iran. His views are regarded as the basis for the nationalistic approach of the Islamic left figures.

== Personal life and death ==
Shadman married Farangis Namazi in London in 1941. In 1967, he was diagnosed with cancer and went to London for treatment. He died there on 26 August 1967 and was buried in Mashhad near the Imam Reza shrine.
