= British military network in Iran =

British Espionage in Iran

- Dates active: c. 1941–Unknown
- Allegiance: United Kingdom
- Wars: World War II; Middle East theatre; Cold War; Iran crisis of 1946; 1953 Iranian coup d'état

The British military network in Iran, an intelligence gathering network that infiltrated the Iranian Armed Forces, dates back to the World War II years and is distinguishable from the long-standing local civilian network run by the British in Iran.

== Activities ==
=== 1940s ===
In early January 1942, the British Defence Security Organization in Tehran (DSO) was established. The main objective of the British network at the time, was to thwart the efforts of German Abwehr network in Iran.

=== 1950s ===
MI6 compiled an "impressive military Who's Who" –detailed personal profiles about Iranian military personnel that included trivial information– with the help of this network, that proved useful in plotting the 1953 Iranian coup d'état. A major function of the network was promotion of its own members while keeping others, especially leftists out of important positions.

==== Known assets ====
The following military personnel are known to act as assets for the network, as of early 1950s:

- Maj. Gen. Hasan Arfa, former Chief of the Joint Staff
- Col. Teymur Bakhtiar, later director of SAVAK
- Col. Hedayatollah Gilanshah, personal adjutant to the shah and later Air Force commander
- Col. Hossein-Ghuli Ashrafi, a brigade commander in the Tehran garrison
- Col. Hassan Akhavi, former director of the Second Bureau

=== 1960s ===
==== Known assets ====
The following military personnel were closely associated with the British, as of 1960s:

- Lt. Gen. Teymur Bakhtiar, director of SAVAK
- Lt. Gen. Mehdi Qoli Alavi Moghadam, chief of police
- Lt. Gen. Haj Ali Kia, director of the Second Bureau

== See also ==
- British occupation of Bushehr
