= Khalil Taleghani =

Iranian politician and engineer (1912–1992)

Khalil Taleghani (1912–1992) was an Iranian engineer who served as the minister of agriculture in the cabinet led by Prime Minister Mohammad Mosaddegh. He is known for his role in the establishment of the Amir Kabir Dam which was built to supply drinking water and electricity to Tehran.

== Biography ==
Taleghani was born in a village, Taleghan, in 1912. He received a degree in construction engineering from a British university. Following his graduation he worked as a faculty member at the University of Tehran. In 1946 he established a company in Ahvaz and worked as a technical director in the construction of Amir Kabir Dam from 1950. In May 1951 Taleghani was named as the minister of agriculture in the cabinet of Mohammad Mosaddegh. After serving in office for 18 months Taleghani resigned from the post for personal reasons. However, he was reappointed to the post in July 1952 and remained as minister of agriculture until the resignation of Prime Minister Mosaddegh in August 1953. During his tenure Taleghani was in charge of organizing the oil production in Qom and developing new oil fields in the Qom region. Taleghani continued his activities in the construction of Amir Kabir Dam in the mid-1950s. He was the minister of advisers in the cabinet led by Manouchehr Eghbal between 1957 and 1960.

Following the regime change in Iran in 1979 Taleghani left the country and died in 1992.

In September 1992 Taleghani published a book entitled Change of Character: An Iranian Minister Remembers.
