= Abdolreza Ansari =

Iranian politician (1925–2020)

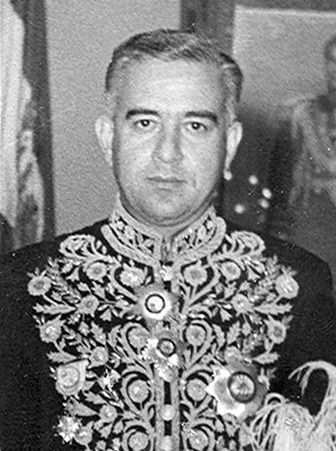

Minister of Interior
- In office 1966–1969
- Monarch: Mohammad Reza Pahlavi
- Prime Minister: Amir-Abbas Hoveyda
- Preceded by: Javad Sadr
- Succeeded by: Ataollah Khosravani

Minister of Labor
- In office 1959 – September 1960
- Monarch: Mohammad Reza Pahlavi
- Prime Minister: Manouchehr Eghbal
- Preceded by: Agha Khan Bakhtiar

Personal details
- Born: 1925
- Died: December 2020 (aged 94–95) Paris
- Education: University of Tehran; Utah State University; University of California, Los Angeles

Abdolreza Ansari (Persian: عبدالرضا انصاری; 1925–2020) was an Iranian engineer, bureaucrat and politician who held various government posts. He served as minister of labor (1959–1960) and minister of interior (1966–1969).

== Early life and education ==
Ansari was born in 1925. His father was Colonel Mohammad Hossein Khan who was killed at age 26 in a battle against rebels before his birth. He graduated from the University of Tehran and Utah State University, receiving degrees in agricultural engineering. He obtained his PhD in law from the University of California, Los Angeles.

== Career ==
Following his return to Iran in 1951 Ansari started his career at the Ministry of Labor. Then he joined the Ministry of National Economy and served as the deputy director of Iran-American Joint Fund for Economic Development and as the deputy minister of state for foreign assistance. He was also the treasurer general of Iran. He became a member of the Nationalists' Party led by Manouchehr Eghbal. In 1959 he was appointed minister of labor to the cabinet of Prime Minister Manouchehr Eghbal, replacing Agha Khan Bakhtiar in the post. Ansari held the post until September 1960. He was appointed minister of interior in 1966 to the cabinet led by Prime Minister Amir-Abbas Hoveyda. Ansari's term ended in 1969, and he was replaced by Ataollah Khosravani in the post. Ansari's other positions included the managing director of Khuzestan Water and Power Authority, governor general of the Khuzestan province and managing director of the Imperial Organization for Social Services. In the latter post Ansari was the deputy of Princess Ashraf Pahlavi.

== Later years, personal life and death ==
Ansari left Iran after the regime change in 1979 and settled in Paris, France. He was one of the founding trustees of the Persia Education Foundation based in Paris. In 2016 he published a book entitled The Shah’s Iran - Rise and Fall Conversations with an Insider of which the English edition was printed by I.B. Tauris.

Ansari was married and had three children: Nazanin, Ketayoun and Mohammad Reza. He died in Paris in December 2020.
