= Abbas Adham =

Iranian physician and politician

- Monarch: Mohammad Reza Shah Pahlavi
- Prime Minister: Abdolhossein Hazhir
- Prime Minister: Mohammad Sa'ed

Minister of Royal Court

Personal details
- Born: 1885 Tabriz, Qajar Iran
- Died: 31 October 1969 (aged 83–84) Tehran, Pahlavi Iran

Abbas Adham (Persian: عباس ادهم; Abbās Adham, 1885 – 31 October 1969) was an Iranian physician and politician who served as health minister (Surgeon Ministry) in Abdolhossein Hazhir and Mohammad Sa'ed cabinets. He was called Alam-ol-molk as honorific address. Abbas Adham worked for Ahmad Shah Qajar as a personal doctor. He also was head of Tehran-resident Azerbaijani people community. Abbas Adham was a member of Red Lion and Sun Society directorate and senator-elect of Senate of Iran.
