= Government of Manouchehr Eghbal =

Imperial Iran's government between April 1957 and August 1960

- Cabinet of Pahlavi Iran

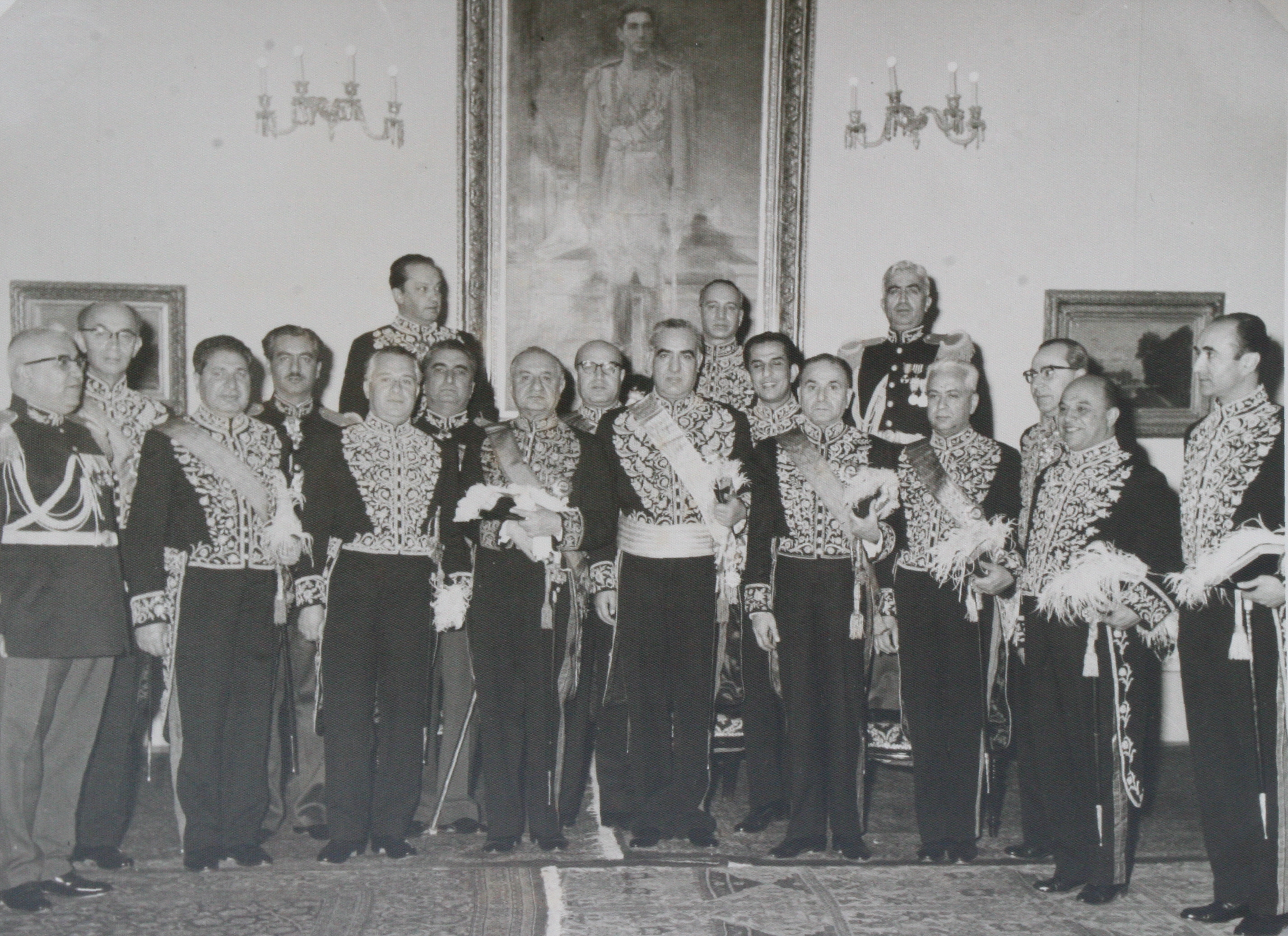
- Cabinet members on the inauguration day
- Date formed: 4 April 1957
- Date dissolved: September 1960

People and organisations
- Head of state: Mohammad Reza Pahlavi
- Head of government: Manouchehr Eghbal
- Total no. of members: 16
- Member party: Nationalists' Party
- Opposition party: People's Party
- Opposition leader: Asadollah Alam

History
- Advice and consent: 14 April 1957; 17 April 1957
- Predecessor: Government of Hossein Ala'
- Successor: Government of Jafar Sharif-Emami

The cabinet led by Prime Minister Manouchehr Eghbal of Iran lasted for three years between April 1957 and September 1960 making it one of the longest tenure cabinets of the Pahlavi rule. The cabinet succeeded the second cabinet of Hossein Ala' who resigned on 3 April 1957.

== Activities and end ==
Manouchehr Eghbal's cabinet was inaugurated on 4 April 1957. Eghbal was the head of the Nationalists' Party. The opposition party was People's Party of Asadollah Alam. One of the first activities of the cabinet was to terminate the martial law on 7 April. However, some of the cabinet members were military officers, including Hassan Akhavi and Ahmad Vosuq. Most of the activities of the cabinet were in line with the political agenda of the Shah.

The cabinet program was approved by the Majlis on 14 April receiving 110 favor votes to 0 against votes with 4 abstentions. Three days later on 17 April the cabinet was endorsed by the Senate with 30 favor votes to 0 against votes with 3 abstentions.

The term of the cabinet ended in September 1960 following the general elections held in late August 1960. The Nationalists' Party won the majority at the 200-seat Parliament. However, the Shah annulled the elections. On 6 September Prime Minister Eghbal submitted his resignation to the Shah because of the mass protests over the election results. Another reason for the resignation of Eghbal was his fierce opposition against the Soviet Union due to which he was criticized by the Soviet leader Nikita Khrushchev. The next cabinet was formed by Jafar Sharif Emami.

== Cabinet members ==
The cabinet was consisted of the following members:

Portfolio	Minister	Took office	Left office	Party
Prime Minister	Manouchehr Eghbal	4 April 1957	September 1960	Nationalists' Party
Deputy Prime Minister	Teymur Bakhtiar	4 April 1957	September 1960	Military
Minister of Foreign Affairs	Aligholi Ardalan	4 April 1957	1959	Independent
Minister of Foreign Affairs	Abbas Aram	1959	31 August 1960	Independent
Minister of National Defense	Ahmad Vosuq	4 April 1957	September 1960	Military
Minister of Interior	Fatollah Jalali	4 April 1957	1958	
Minister of Interior	Nader Batmanghelidj	1958	1959	Military
Minister of Interior	Rahmat Allah Atabaki	1959	September 1960	
Minister of Justice	Mohammad Majlisi	4 April 1957	September 1960	
Minister of Agriculture	Hassan Akhavi	4 April 1957	1959	Military
Minister of Agriculture	Jamshid Amouzegar	1959	September 1960	
Minister of Labor	Agha Khan Bakhtiar	4 April 1957	1959	
Minister of Labor	Abdolreza Ansari	1959	September 1960	Nationalists' Party
Minister of Finance	Ali Asghar Nasir	4 April 1957	September 1960	
Minister of Health	Abdul Hussain Raji	4 April 1957	September 1960	
Minister of Education	Mahmud Mehran	4 April 1957	September 1960	
Minister of Mines and Industries	Jafar Sharif-Emami	4 April 1957	September 1960	Nationalists' Party
Minister of Customs	Ali-Akbar Zargham	4 April 1957	September 1960	Military
Minister of Post	Amir Ghassan Eshraghi	4 April 1957	September 1960	
Minister of Commerce	Mustafa Tajadod	4 April 1957	September 1960	
Minister of Advisors	Khalil Taleghani	4 April 1957	September 1960	

=== Reshuffles ===
Interior Minister Fatollah Jalali was succeeded by an army general Nader Batmanghelidj in 1958. Batmanghelidj's term was very brief and ended in 1959 when Rahmat Allah Atabaki replaced him in the post. Agriculture Minister Hassan Akhavi was removed from office in 1959 due to his opposition to the land reform plans and was replaced by Jamshid Amouzegar in the post. Agha Khan Bakhtiar, labor minister, was replaced by Abdolreza Ansari who was in office until September 1960.
