= Aria Party =

Defunct fascist political party in Pahlavi Iran

Aria Party حزب آریا
- Leader: Hasan Arfa
- Military leader: Habibollah Deyhami
- Founder: Hadi Sepehr
- Founded: 1946; 80 years ago
- Dissolved: 1953; 73 years ago
- Membership: 300 (1951 est.)
- Ideology: Fascism; Monarchism; Chauvinism; Iranian nationalism Pan-Iranism; Anti-Arabism; Anti-communism; Antisemitism
- Political position: Far-right
- Colours: Grey

Aria Party (Persian: حزب آریا, romanized: Ḥezb-e Āryā, lit. 'Aryan Party'; also spelled Arya and Ariya) was a monarchist and nationalist political party in Iran known for its pro-British policy and staunch anti-communist tendency. It was alleged to have been financed by the Imperial State.

Along with other small right-wing parties such as Pan-Iranist Party at the time, it blamed all the social ills of Iranian society on the Muslim conquest of Persia.

General Hasan Arfa was the leader of the party. The party had an active military wing, an entourage of Imperial Iranian Army officers, led by Deyhami. However the real mastermind behind it was Hassan Akhavi, who organized events culminating in the 1953 Iranian coup d'état. Hossein Manouchehri, Aminzadeh, Yahyayi and Mahmoud Eram were among the distinguished members.

Members of the party wore gray shirts and caps and mimicked German Nazi appearance.
