= Teymur Bakhtiar =

Iranian military officer and politician (1914–1970)

Timsar Teymur Bakhtiar
- تیمور بختیار
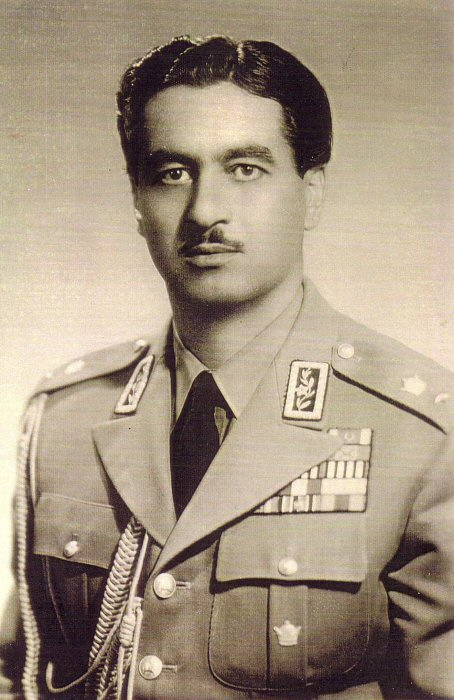
- Bakhtiar in 1955

Director of SAVAK
- In office 12 March 1957 – 26 February 1961
- Monarch: Mohammad Reza Pahlavi
- Prime Minister: Manouchehr Eghbal; Jafar Sharif-Emami
- Preceded by: Office Established
- Succeeded by: Hassan Pakravan

Deputy Prime minister
- In office 12 March 1957 – 26 February 1961

Military Governor of Tehran
- In office 1954 – 12 March 1957
- Monarch: Mohammad Reza Pahlavi
- Prime Minister: Fazlollah Zahedi; Hossein Ala'; Manouchehr Eghbal
- Preceded by: Farhad Dadsetan
- Succeeded by: ?

Personal details
- Born: 1914 Shahr-e Kord, Qajar Iran
- Died: 12 August 1970 (aged 55–56) Baghdad, Ba'athist Iraq
- Resting place: Imam Ali Shrine, Najaf, Iraq
- Education: Saint-Cyr; Officers' Academy; War University

Military service
- Allegiance: Pahlavi Iran
- Branch/service: Ground Forces
- Years of service: 1933–1961
- Rank: Lieutenant General
- Commands: Kermanshah Brigade (1953–1954); 3rd Mountain Brigade (1952–1953); Cavalry Assault Regiment (1946–1947)
- Battles/wars: World War II; Anglo-Soviet invasion of Iran; Iran crisis of 1946; 1953 Iranian coup d'état

Teymur Bakhtiar (Persian: تیمور بختیار; 1914 – 12 August 1970) was an Iranian military officer and intelligence chief who was the founder and head of SAVAK from 1957 to 1961 when he was dismissed by Mohammad Reza Pahlavi. In 1970, he was assassinated by SAVAK agents in Iraq.

He was an asset in the British military network in Iran.

== Early life ==
Bakhtiar was born in 1914 to Sardar Moazzam Bakhtiari, a chieftain of the eminent Bakhtiari tribe. He studied at a French school in Beirut (many Iranians were Francophiles at the time: e. g. Amir-Abbas Hoveyda and General Hassan Pakravan) from 1928 to 1933, whereupon he was accepted to the renowned Saint-Cyr military academy. After returning to Iran, he graduated from Tehran's Military Academy. His cousin, Shapour Bakhtiar, and he went together to both Beirut and Paris for higher education.

Then he was made a first lieutenant and dispatched to Zahedan. Bakhtiar's first wife was Iran Khanom, the daughter of the Bakhtiari chieftain Sardar-e Zafar. Their daughter, Golnar, married Kambiz Yazdanpanah, the son of Morteza Yazdanpanah, in Tehran in 1960. At that time, the Bakhtiaris were extremely influential; the Shah's second wife, Queen Soraya Esfandiary-Bakhtiary, and his last prime minister, Shapour Bakhtiar, were both related to Teymour Bakhtiar.

== Military career ==
After some time, Bakhtiar was transferred to Zahedan with the rank of First Lieutenant to continue his service. Concurrently with World War II, he was transferred to Isfahan, and subsequently returned to Tehran in 1942 with the rank of Captain. By 1946, he attained the command of a regiment. Following the Anglo-Soviet invasion of Iran during World War II when the USSR refused to withdraw its troops from Iran, the separatist movement intensified in a number of regions of the country. In 1946, having received the relevant order of the Shah's government, Teymur took part in pacifying the Khamseh region. He organized a kind of guerrilla struggle against soldiers of the Red Army and the separatist movement and was one of the commanders of the Cavalry Assault Regiment, as a result of which many separatist fighters were killed in clashes with pro-Shah forces. Suppressing the armed resistance of the nomadic Khamseh tribes, the government sent him as governor to Zahedan.

In 1947, he entered the War University and completed the Command and Staff College (DAFOS) course. That same year, Bakhtiar achieved the rank of Lieutenant Colonel, and in 1950, he was promoted to Colonel and became the commander of the 3rd Mountain Brigade. In 1952, he suppressed the rebellion of his uncle, Abolqasem Khan Bakhtiar, in Isfahan. In recognition of this success, he was appointed commander of the Kermanshah Armoured Brigade.

Bakhtiar was appointed commander of the Kermanshah Brigade ten days before the August 19th (28 Mordad) coup. He was among those who, while accepting participation in the coup, declared readiness to march on Tehran with the Kermanshah Brigade if necessary. General Reza Azimi rejected this claim by Bakhtiar, holding the view that Bakhtiar had not yet fully taken charge of his brigade at that time to be capable of dispatching it to Tehran.

Bakhtiar rose rapidly in Iran's military after the fall of Prime Minister Mohammad Mosaddegh in 1953. A close associate of Prime Minister Fazlollah Zahedi, he was promoted to military governor of Tehran. One of his first major successes was the capture and trial of Mossadeq's minister of foreign affairs, Hossein Fatemi, who had actively fought the military government that succeeded Mossadegh's period in office.

Bakhtiar waged an extensive campaign against the communist Tudeh party; he arrested and had 24 Tudeh leaders summarily tried and executed. He was also involved in the arrest of Islamic fundamentalist Khalil Tahmasebi, the assassin of former Prime Minister Ali Razmara. For these accomplishments, he was appointed modern Iran's youngest three-star general in 1954.

From August 1953 to Autumn 1954, about 660 of the most ardent supporters of the ousted prime minister were arrested. Of these, 130 were former employees of the oil enterprises in Abadan. A significant part of the arrested officers were members of the Tudeh party. All those who escaped execution were sentenced to various years in prison. On 19 October 1954, the death sentence of the first group of officers from Tudeh was carried out. On 30 October, the second group of Tudeh officers consisting of 6 people were shot. On 8 November, the third group of 5 people were shot, and on 10 November, by the verdict of a military tribunal, Hossein Fatemi was executed. Before being executed, he was brutally tortured.

With the full support of the Shah's court and the West, the new government brought down brutal repressions against members of the pro-Mossadegh and leftist organizations, figures known for their anti-monarchist views. The government managed to break almost all the military and political resistance of the opposition. Throughout 1953, minor scattered armed protests by opposition representatives against the military government continued. In the spring of 1954, ayatollah Abol-Ghasem Kashani, publicist Seyyed Hossein Makki, and other opposition leaders made an attempt to organize mass protests against the Zahedi government. However, the demonstrations that began at their call did not lead to a change in the existing situation. By that time, the court and the government had become masters of the situation, having established full control over the army, police and gendarmerie, strengthening the Shah's imperial guard.

== Head of SAVAK ==
Bakhtiar was made head of the newly formed intelligence and security service SAVAK in February 1956. He ruthlessly crushed any opposition to the regime, including communists, socialists, and Islamists.

Under the General Bakhtiar, SAVAK turned into an effective secret agency of internal security to combat the enemies of the monarchical regime of the Pahlavi dynasty.

After Prime Minister Jafar Sharif-Emami was forced to resign in May 1961 due to ongoing demonstrations against large-scale rigging in the parliamentary elections, Teymur Bakhtiar hoped to become the new Prime Minister. Shah made a bet on Ali Amini. General Bakhtiar then contacted the US Embassy in order to enlist their support for a "coup" against Amini. A surprised American ambassador informed the Shah about Bakhtiar's plans. Soon Bakhtiar was removed from his post as head of SAVAK and was sent abroad.

== Fall ==
With the appointment of Ali Amini as prime minister in 1961, the Shah began to distrust Bakhtiar. Amini warned the Shah of Bakhtiar's contacts with John F. Kennedy, and Bakhtiar was dismissed in 1961. Amini was a Kennedy supporter and was dismissed in 1962 partly because of the Shah's growing distrust of Kennedy.

Initially from his self chosen exile in Geneva, Bakhtiar retaliated by establishing contacts with Iranian dissidents in Europe, Iraq, and Lebanon, using the contacts he had built during his time at SAVAK.

Bakhtiar arrived in Lebanon on 12 April 1968, and was arrested in May for "arms smuggling". Lebanese officials then informed the Iranian embassy in Beirut. As Iranian courts harassed Bakhtiar on charges of high treason, the Iranian government asked the Lebanese government on 13 May to transfer Bakhtiar to Iranian judicial authorities. The Iranian request was based on the principle of cooperation between the judiciary and the Lebanese criminal code regarding extradition of criminals. But Bakhtiar managed to get out of prison and emigrate to Iraq. In 1969, the Iranian parliament passed a law under which Teymur Bakhtiar was deprived of all military ranks, and all his movable and immovable property were confiscated.

He met not only Ayatollah Khomeini but also Reza Radmanesh, the General Secretary of the Tudeh Party, and Mahmud Panahian, the "War Minister" of autonomy-seeking state Azerbaijan People's Government, that had emerged briefly after the Soviet forces withdrew from Iran, following World War II. The Shah issued a warrant for Bakhtiar's arrest, but the general sought refuge in Iraq.

On 12 August 1970, during a hunting party, he was shot and killed by an Iranian SAVAK agent, feigning to be a sympathizer. As a cover for the plot, the assassin and a colleague had hijacked an Iranian passenger plane, forcing it to land in Baghdad. Disguised as dissidents of the Iranian government, the two assassins duped the Iraqi regime and gained access to Teymur Bakhtiar and his entourage. The truth behind these circumstances emerged only years later. Mohammad Reza Shah Pahlavi himself has been quoted as claiming the assassination a personal success. In an Interview with the French author and biographer, Gérard de Villiers, the Shah publicly made a statement to this effect.

Bahktiar's would be assassin was a trusted person, living on the premises of Bakhtiar mansion in Baghdad and could have had the General assassinated at a much earlier time. However, the chances for escape were slim, as Teymur Bakhtiar was a VIP guest of the Iraqi government and was both watched and protected by Iraqi bodyguards.

Bakhtiar's murder was investigated at the highest level. There was only one assassin. Once out hunting in the field, the assassin fired a shot at him with a pistol, hitting him in the shoulder, thus making Bakhtiar drop his rifle. Immediately, Bakhtiar's Iraqi bodyguard attempted to shoot the assassin with an AK-47, but was shot in the forehead first. The general reached for his revolver with his left hand, but was shot 5 times in the torso and left hand by the assassin. Bakhtiar was taken to hospital and underwent surgery, but died shortly thereafter from massive internal bleeding.

The assassin quickly left the scene, heading towards the Iranian border. He fell unconscious several kilometers before reaching the border crossing, due to the heat. He was captured by an Iraqi border patrol and taken to Baghdad alive. His fate remains unknown. It is also not known where he obtained his small-arms training as well as the pistol used.

== Sources ==
- Zabih, S. "Bakhtiar, Teymur." Ed. Ehsan Yarshater. Encyclopædia Iranica. Vol. III. New York: Encyclopædia Iranica Foundation, 1989.

== Bibliography ==
- Ehsan Yar-Shater (1988). Encyclopaedia Iranica. Vol. 3. Routledge. p. 896. ISBN 978-0710091147.
- Папава, В. А. (2016). САВАК (Служба разведки и государственной безопасности шаха Ирана). Vol. 1. Тбилиси: Берика. p. 520. ISBN 978-9941-0-8932-9.
- Ehsan Naraghi (2007). From Palace to Prison: Inside the Iranian Revolution. Ivan R. Dee. p. 301. ISBN 978-1566637671.
- Alavi, Nasrin (2005). We Are Iran: The Persian Blogs. Soft Skull. p. 372. ISBN 978-1933368054.
- Gerard de Villiers (1974). The Imperial Shah: An Informal Biography. Weidenfeld and Nicolson. p. 305. ISBN 978-0316181525.

Government offices
New title	Director of the National Organization for Security and Intelligence; 1957−1961	Succeeded by Hassan Pakravan
