= Abdolhossein Hazhir =

Iranian politician (1902–1949)

- عبدالحسین هژیر
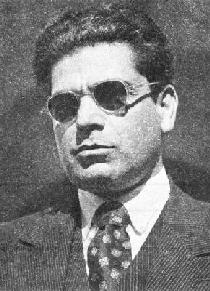

27th Prime Minister of Iran
- In office 13 June 1948 – 9 November 1948
- Monarch: Mohammad Reza Pahlavi
- Preceded by: Ebrahim Hakimi
- Succeeded by: Mohammad Sa'ed

Personal details
- Born: 4 June 1902 Kashan, Qajar Iran
- Died: 5 November 1949 (aged 47) Tehran, Pahlavi Iran
- Education: University of Isfahan

Abdolhossein Hazhir (Persian: عبدالحسین هژیر; 4 June 1902 – 5 November 1949) was an Iranian politician who served as the Prime Minister of Iran under Mohammad Reza Pahlavi in 1948, having been a minister 10 times. One of his posts was the minister of finance.

During Hazhir's premiership in 1948 his policies were harshly criticized by Ayatollah Kashani who was one of the clerics close to the Fada'iyan-e Islam's leader Navvab Safavi. He was also subject to the criticisms of media outlets. One of them was a satirical magazine entitled Tawfiq which was closed by the government due to its frequent cartoons mocking Prime Minister Hazhir. In November 1949, while serving as minister of royal court, Hazhir was assassinated at the Sepahsalar Mosque, Tehran. The perpetrator was found to be Seyyed Hossein Emami Esfahani, a member of Fada'iyan-e Islam, an Islamist militant organization led by Navvab Safavi.

== See also ==
- List of prime ministers of Iran

Political offices
| Preceded by Ebrahim Hakimi | Prime Minister of Iran; 1948 | Succeeded by Mohammad Sa'ed |
