= Manouchehr Eghbal =

Iranian physician and politician (1909–1977)

- منوچهر اقبال
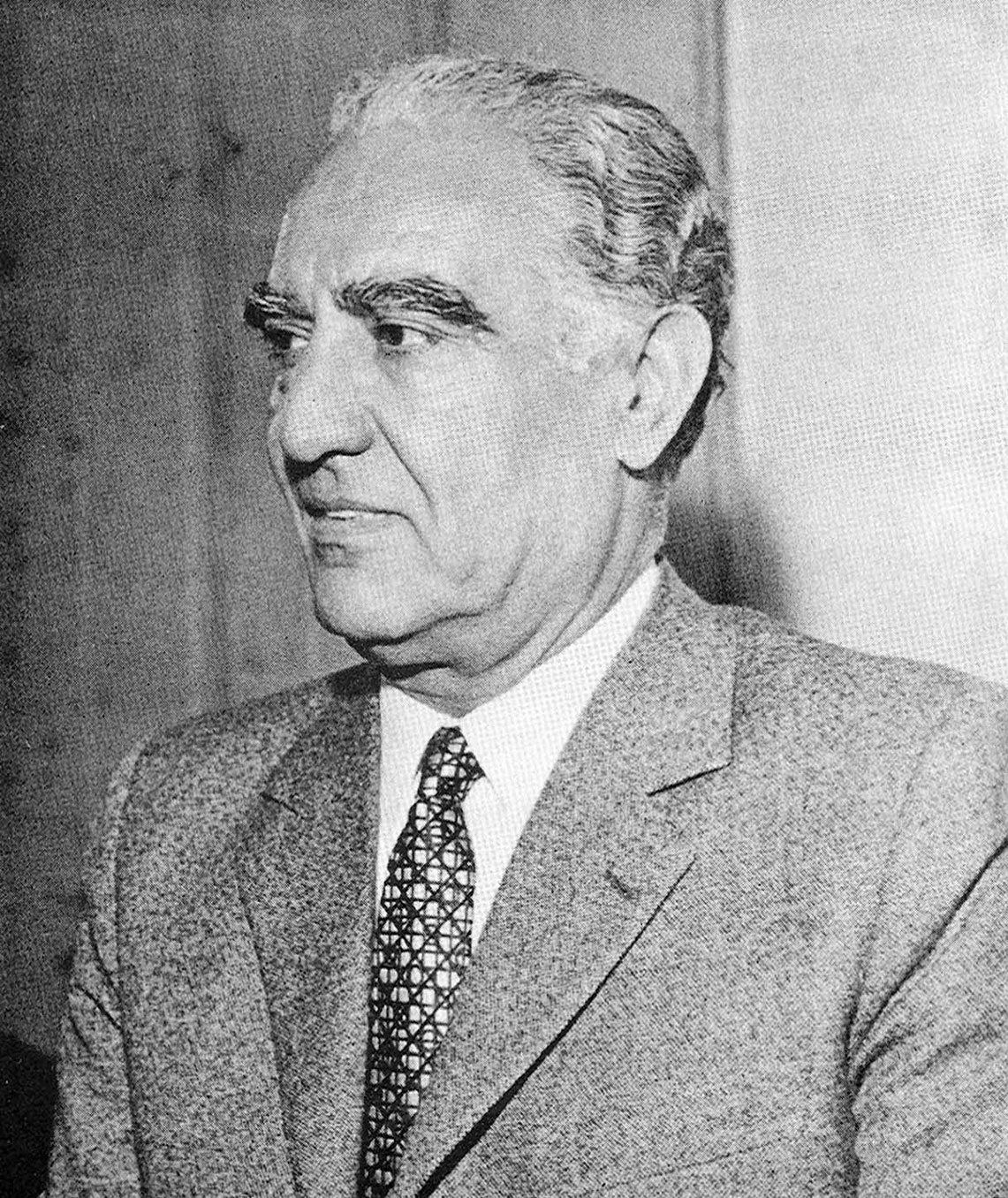

Prime Minister of Iran
- In office 3 April 1957 – 1 September 1960
- Monarch: Mohammad Reza Shah
- Preceded by: Hossein Ala'
- Succeeded by: Jafar Sharif-Emami

Personal details
- Born: September 1909 Mashhad, Sublime State of Iran
- Died: 25 November 1977 (aged 67–68) Tehran, Imperial State of Iran
- Party: Nationalists’ Party (1957–1963); Democratic Party (1946–1948)
- Spouse: Alice Eghbal
- Children: 3
- Education: University of Tehran; University of Paris

Manouchehr Eghbal (Persian: منوچهر اقبال; September 1909 – 25 November 1977) was an Iranian physician and royalist politician. He was the Prime Minister of Iran from 1957 to 1960.

== Early life and education ==
Eghbal was born in Mashhad in September 1909, and his family was from Khorasan. He had an older brother, Ali.

Eghbal studied at Dar al-Fonun. He finished his advanced studies in medicine at the University of Paris in 1933.

== Career and activities ==
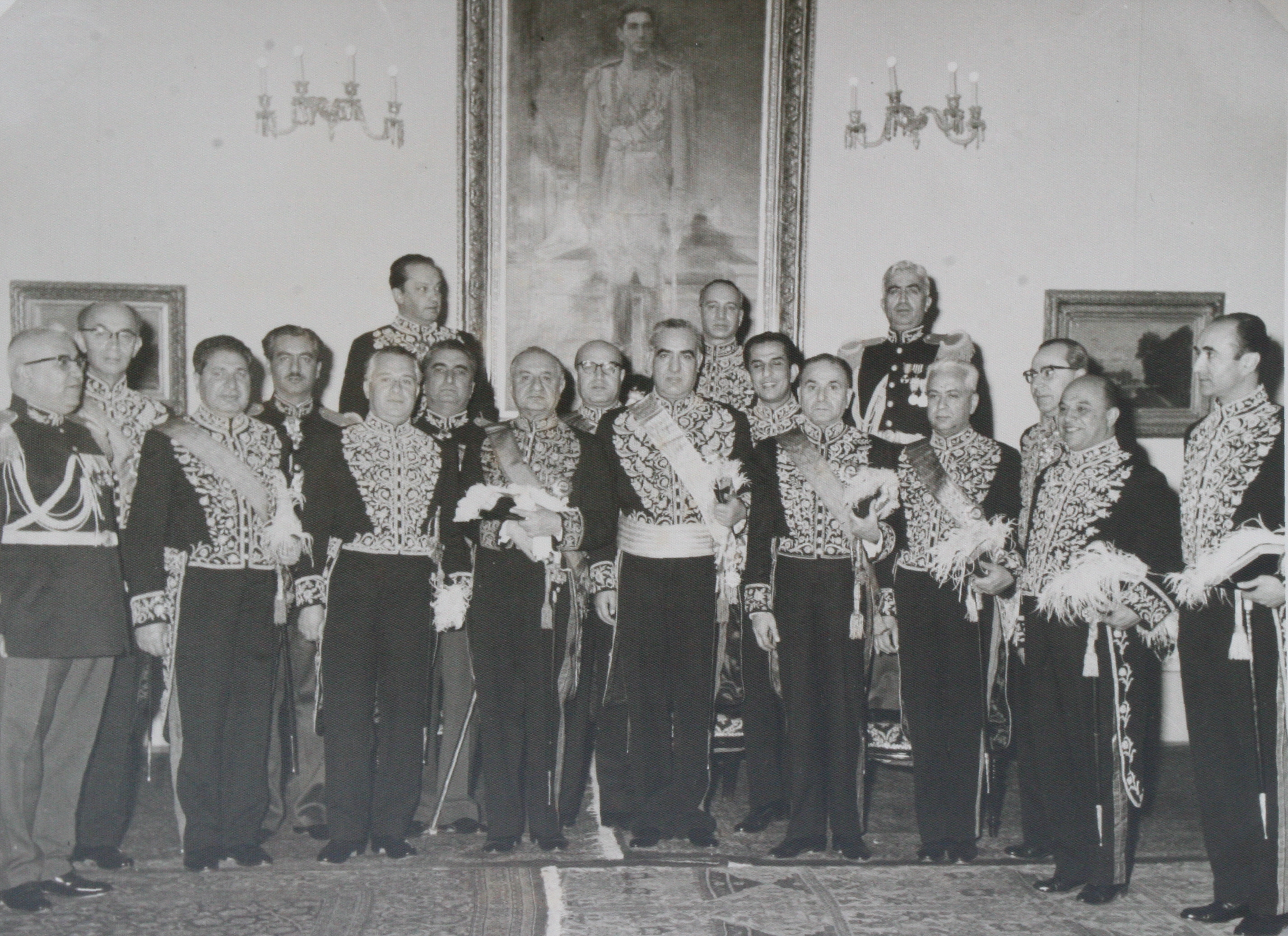
Eghbal's Cabinet - Ali-Akbar Zargham (far left), Teymur Bakhtiar (fourth from left), Manouchehr Eghbal (center), Jafar Sharif-Emami (left of Eghbal), Jamshid Amouzegar (right of Eghbal), Asadollah Alam (far right)

Following his graduation in 1933, Eghbal was employed as a physician in Mashhad. In the 1940s, he was made deputy health minister. He was a member of the French Academy of Medicine. He was named the undersecretary of the Ministry of Health in 1943. In 1950, Eghbal was appointed chancellor of University of Tabriz. He was the governor of Azerbaijan in 1950–52. He became chancellor of University of Tehran in 1954. Five years later he became Iran's envoy to UNESCO. He then taught at Sorbonne for a while and became a member of the French National Academy of Medicine. During this period he founded the Nationalists' Party and served as the party's chair.

Eghbal was appointed minister of health in the cabinet led by Mohammad Sa'ed in 1944. He also held the same post in the cabinet led by Ahmad Qavam (1946). Then he served as the minister of education in the cabinet of Abdolhossein Hazhir (1948), minister of transportation in the cabinet led by Ali Mansur, and interior minister in the cabinet of Mohammad Sa'ed between 1948 and 1950.

In April 1957, Eghbal became prime minister, replacing Hossein Ala' in the post. Eghbal was also named as the chief of Plan Orgazination in February 1959 when Abol Hassan Ebtehaj resigned from office. His cabinet lasted until September 1960, and he was replaced by Jafar Sharif-Emami as prime minister. Until his death, he served as the chairman of the National Iranian Oil Company. He was also a close aide of Mohammad Reza Pahlavi and served as a board member of the royal organization of social welfare headed by Princess Ashraf Pahlavi.

== Personal life and death ==
Eghbal married a French woman, Alice, during his studies in France. They had three daughters. The eldest Nicole became a nun. The second, Monique, married a Swiss surgeon and had a daughter, Muriel. The youngest daughter, Maryam Francoise, first married Prince Mahmoud Reza Pahlavi in October 1964 when she was 18 years old, but the marriage ended in divorce and she married Shahriar Shafiq.

Eghbal died of a heart attack on 25 November 1977 in Tehran, aged 68.

=== Honors ===
Eghbal was given the title of honorary doctorate by the University of Paris in 1959. He was also awarded the same title by the University of Bordeaux.

Political offices
| Preceded by Hossein Ala' | Prime Minister of Iran; 1957–1960 | Succeeded by Jafar Sharif-Emami |
Party political offices
| Preceded by Office established | Leader of the Nationalists’ Party; 1957–1963 | Succeeded by Office abolished |
